= BAIC Group =

Chinese automobile manufacturer

Beijing Automotive Group Co., Ltd.

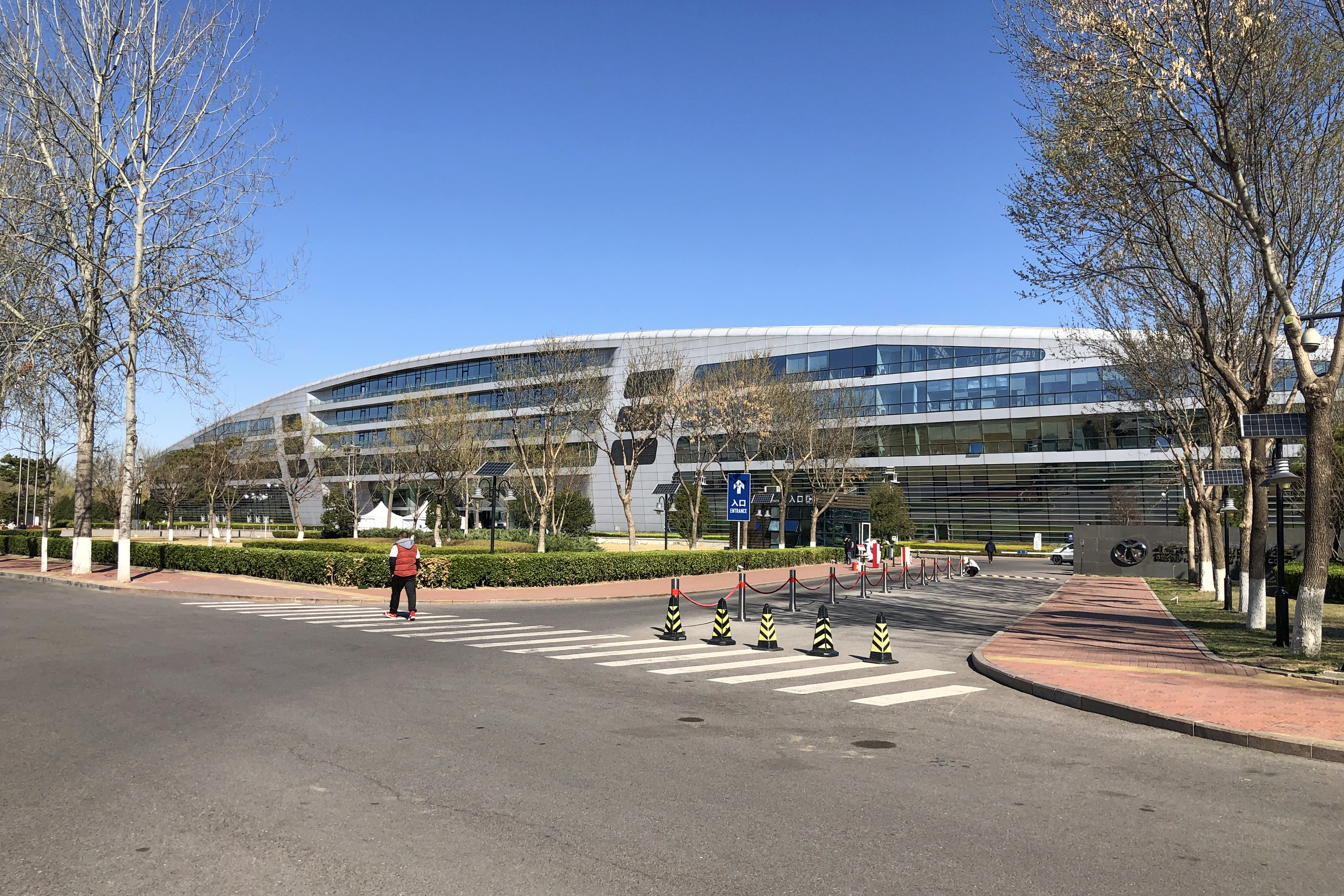
- Headquarters
- Native name: 北京汽车集团有限公司
- Formerly: Beijing Automotive Industry Corporation Group
- Type: State-owned
- Industry: Automotive
- Founded: 1958; 68 years ago
- Headquarters: 99 Shuanghe Ave., Shunyi District, Beijing, China
- Area served: Worldwide
- Key people: Zhang Jianyong (chairman); Chang Rui (General manager)
- Products: Commercial and passenger vehicles
- Revenue: CN¥480,738,070,000
- Owner: Beijing Municipal Government
Subsidiaries
BAIC Motor	(44.98%)
→ Beijing Benz	(51%)
→ Beijing Hyundai	(50%)
Beiqi Foton Motor
BAIC Trucks (北汽重卡)
Beijing Foton Automotive	(50%)
- Website: baicgroup.com.cn

BAIC Group
- Simplified Chinese: 北京汽车集团有限公司
- Traditional Chinese: 北京汽車集團有限公司
- Literal meaning: Beijing Automotive Group Co Ltd
Transcriptions
Standard Mandarin
- Hanyu Pinyin: Běijīng qìchē jítuán yǒuxiàn gōngsī

Alternative Chinese name
- Simplified Chinese: 北京汽车工业控股有限责任公司
- Traditional Chinese: 北京汽車工業控股有限責任公司
- Literal meaning: Beijing Automotive Industry Holding Co Ltd
Transcriptions
Standard Mandarin
- Hanyu Pinyin: Běijīng Qìchē Gōngyè Kònggǔ Yǒuxiàn Zérèn Gōngsī

Beijing Automotive Group Co., Ltd. (BAIC, formerly as Beijing Automotive Industry Corporation) is a Chinese state-owned automobile manufacturer headquartered in Shunyi, Beijing. Founded in 1958, it is the sixth largest automobile manufacturer in China, with 1.723 million sales in 2021.

The company produces and sells vehicles under its own branding, such as Arcfox, Beijing, Foton Motor, Ruili Doda, as well as under foreign-branded joint ventures such as Beijing-Benz and Beijing-Hyundai. It also produces electric vehicles under some of the previously listed brandings, including dedicated EV brands such as Arcfox. Its principal subsidiaries include the passenger car maker BAIC Motor (44.98% share); and truck, van, bus, and agricultural equipment automaker, Foton Motor. A large proportion of sales BAIC's sales is in agricultural, commercial, and military vehicles.

== History ==
BAIC was originally founded in 1958 as Beijing Automobile Works (BAW), which produced the Dongfanghong BJ760, a vehicle based on the Soviet GAZ-21.

BAIC was one of the top ten most-productive Chinese automakers in 2010. This may be due to subsidiary Beijing Automobile Works and a sustained surge of popularity for Beijing Hyundai products. It reached fifth place by selling nearly 1.5 millions units garnering a market share of more than 8%. 2011 production of 1.5 million whole vehicles made BAIC the fifth largest vehicle-maker in China that year in terms of units manufactured. BAIC remained fifth in 2012, which saw the company make 1.7 million whole vehicles; 30% of production was commercial or heavy-duty products.

=== Saab technology transfer ===
After several unsuccessful attempts to buy struggling European automakers in 2009, such as Saab, Volvo, and Opel as well as technology from the American Chrysler, BAIC fulfilled its aim of obtaining valuable Western technology that same year purchasing technology from a former unit of General Motors, Saab Automobile. This allows it to produce older Saab models (but not brand them as Saabs) for sale in China.

The intellectual property bought by BAIC includes the rights to three overall vehicle platforms, Saab 9-3 and Saab 9-5 technologies, two engine technologies, and two transmission systems.

Cars with Saab technology were expected to go on sale in 2012 but didn't debut until May 2013. The first Saab-based model on sale is the Senova C70 or 绅宝 (Shenbao), which may be translated as "gentleman's treasure".

BAIC Group sold Beijing Automobile Manufacturing Plant in 2016.

In 2016, BAIC Group sold 2.85 million vehicles and had an operating income of 406.1 billion yuan, ranking 160th in the 2016 Fortune Global 500 list. In 2017, BAIC Group ranked 137th on the Fortune Global 500 list.

In July 2019, BAIC Group acquired 5% of the shares of Daimler AG (since 2022 Mercedes-Benz Group). In December 2021, BAIC Group increased its stake in Daimler AG to 9.98%, surpassing Geely Group to become the largest shareholder of Daimler AG.

In August 2024, BAIC and Huawei's smart car technology ecological alliance "Harmony Intelligent Mobility Alliance" cooperated to launch the Stelato S9 smart flagship sedan. This is also the first model of BAIC and Huawei's joint brand Stelato.

== Leadership ==
- Xu Heyi (2007–2020)
- Jiang Deyi (2020–2024)
- Zhang Jianyong (2024–present)

== Subsidiaries ==
=== BAIC BluePark ===
BAIC BluePark is BAIC Group's subsidiary mainly engaged in the design, research and development and sales of electric automobiles. BAIC BluePark was restructured from its current subsidiary, Beijing Electric Vehicle Co., Ltd. (BAIC BJEV). The company currently operate the brands of Arcfox and EV models of Beijing brand.

=== BAIC Motor ===
BAIC Motor is the main subsidiary of BAIC Group, it is co-owned by BAIC Group and Beijing Municipal Government. It currently operate the "Beijing" brand.

=== BAIC Group Off-road Vehicle Co., Ltd. ===
Beijing Off-road Vehicles (北京越野) used to be a department under BAIC Group, run by the fully owned subsidiary BAIC Group Off-road Vehicle Co., Ltd.

In January 2020, BAIC announced the independence of Beijing Off-road brand.

=== BAIC Foton Motor Co., Ltd ===
BAIC Foton, also known as Foton Motor or Foton, is a subsidiary of BAIC Group that designs and manufactures trucks, buses and sport utility vehicles.

== Brands ==
BAIC's product line includes passenger vehicles, commercial vehicles, military vehicles and agricultural machinery and construction machineryThe Beijing brand is the main passenger vehicle brand of BAIC, operated by multiple subsidiaries of BAIC Group according to different focus. They all share the same BEIJING badges and logos.

- Stelato, Arcfox and electric vehicles of Beijing brand are currently operated by BAIC BluePark.
- Beijing brand ICE cars, SUVs are operated by BAIC Motor.

=== Arcfox ===
Arcfox is BAIC's premium EV brand operated by BAIC BluePark, established in 2017.

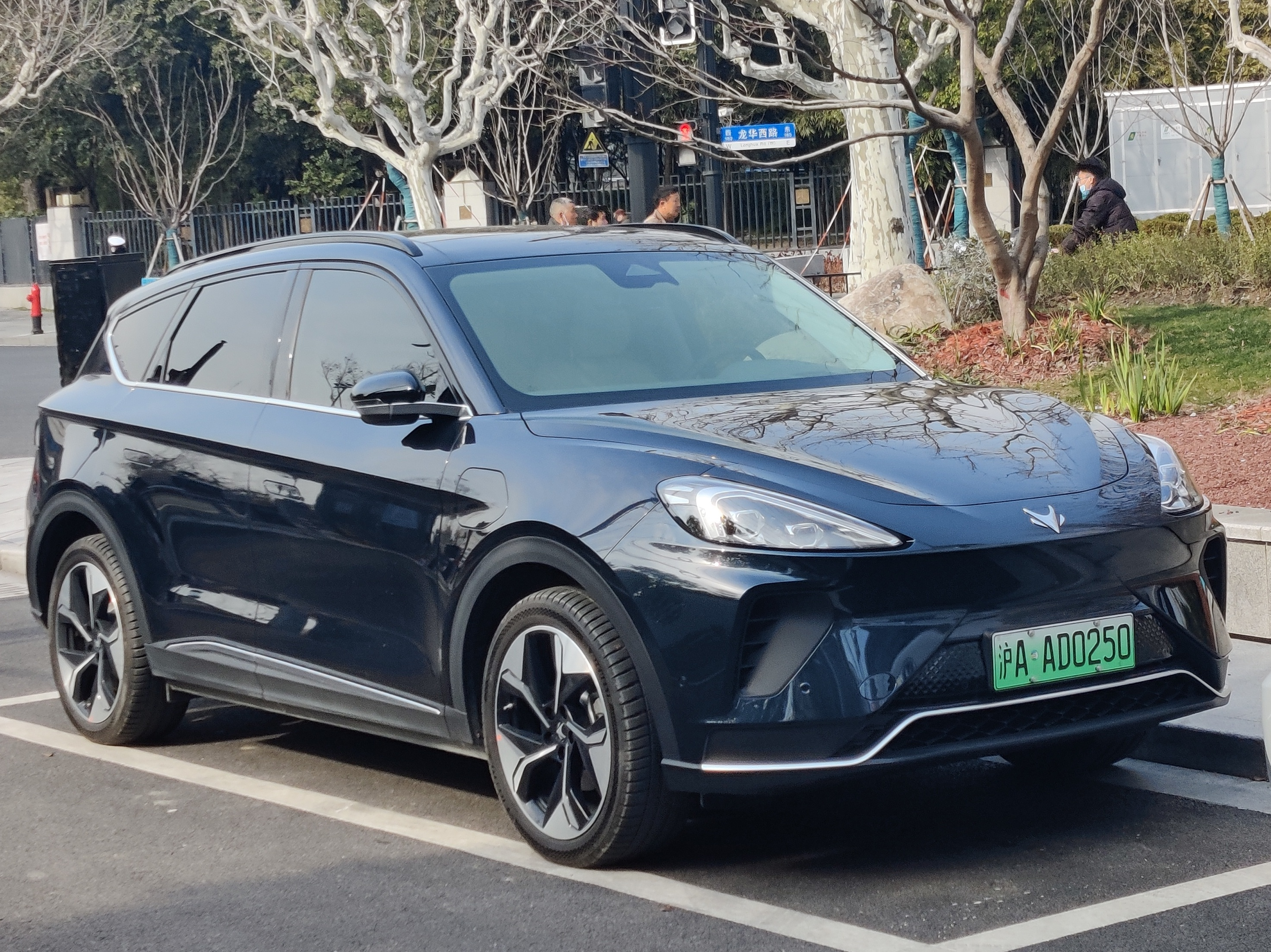
Arcfox α-T

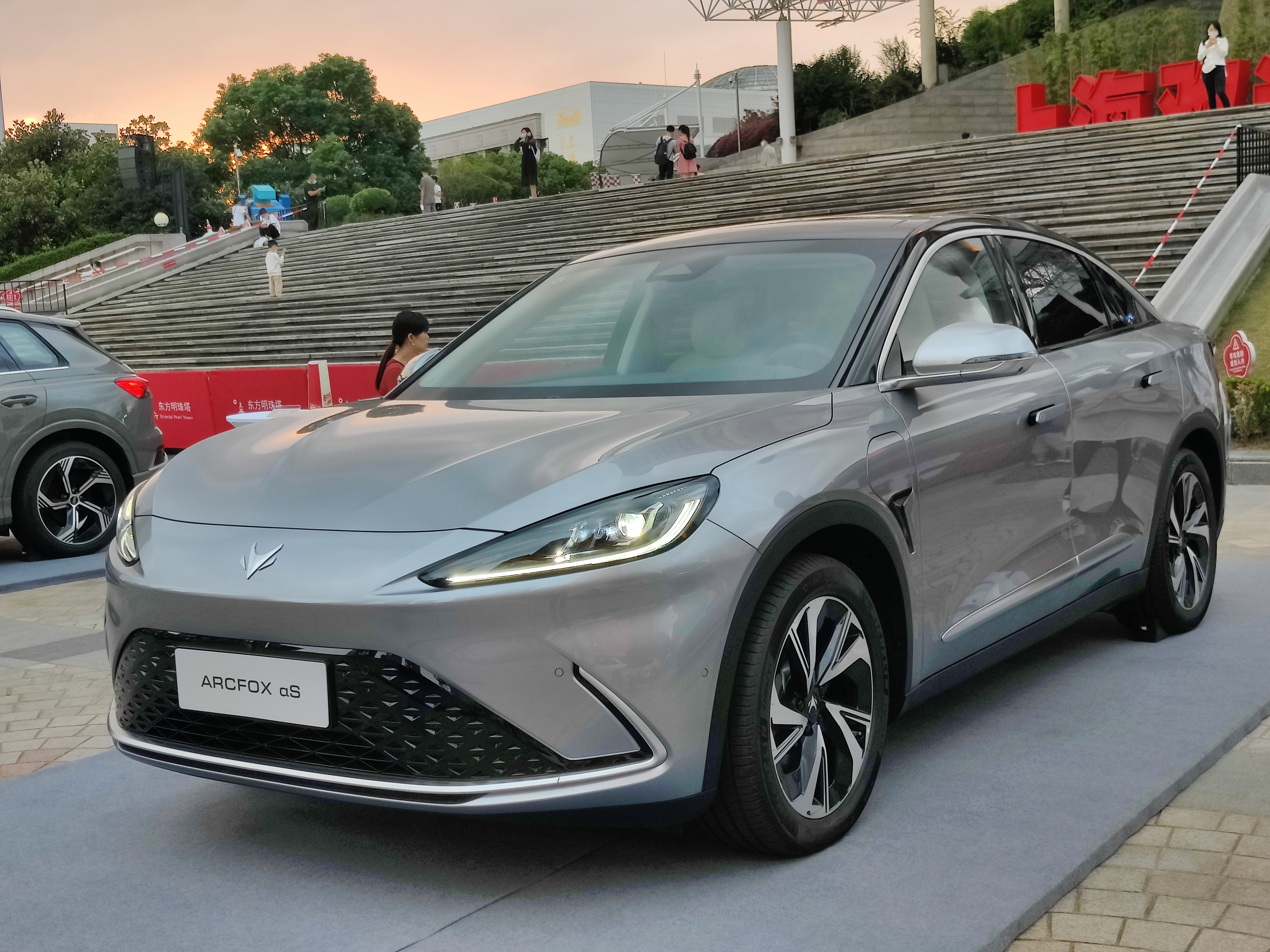
Arcfox α-S

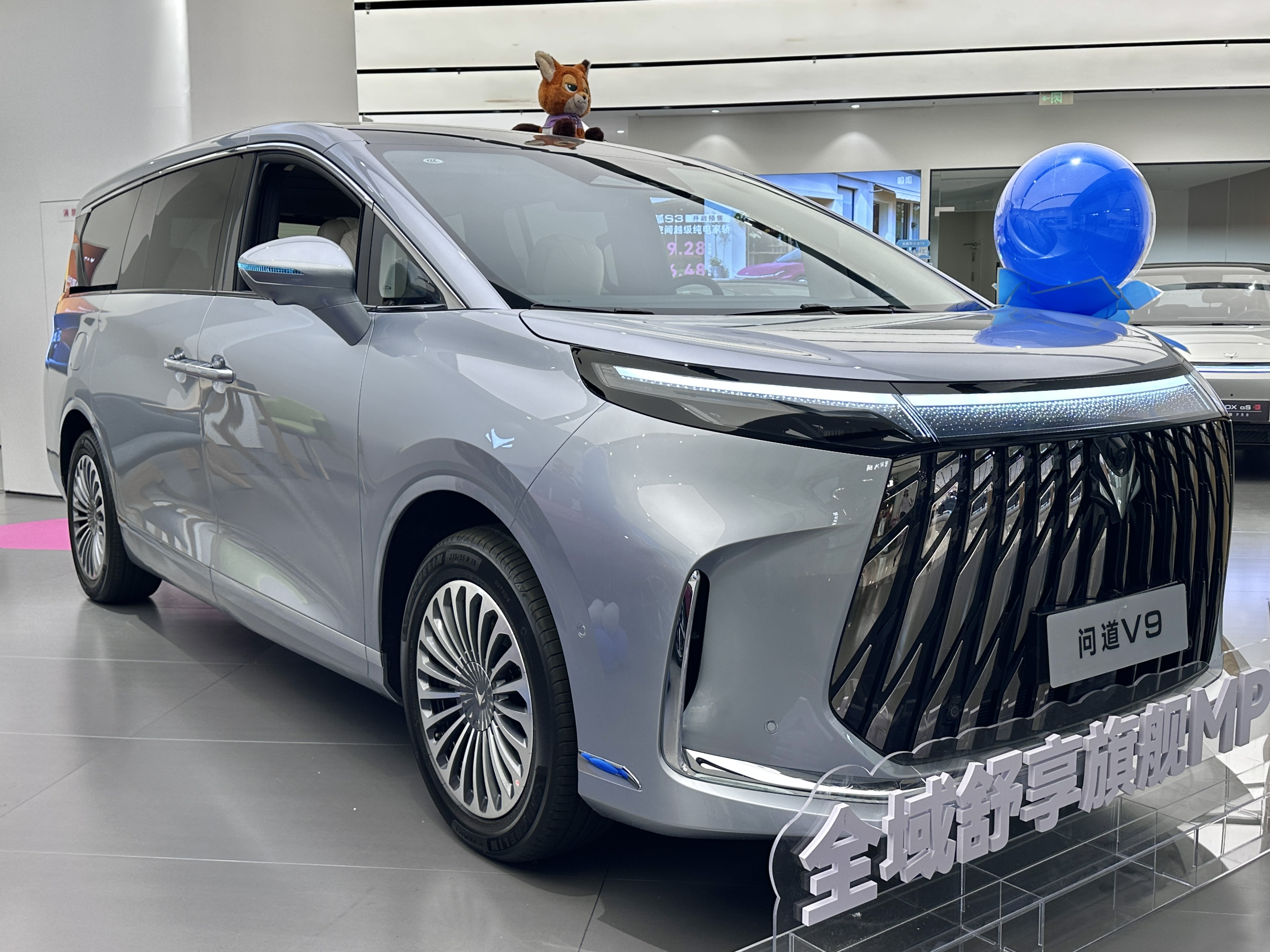
Arcfox Wendao V9

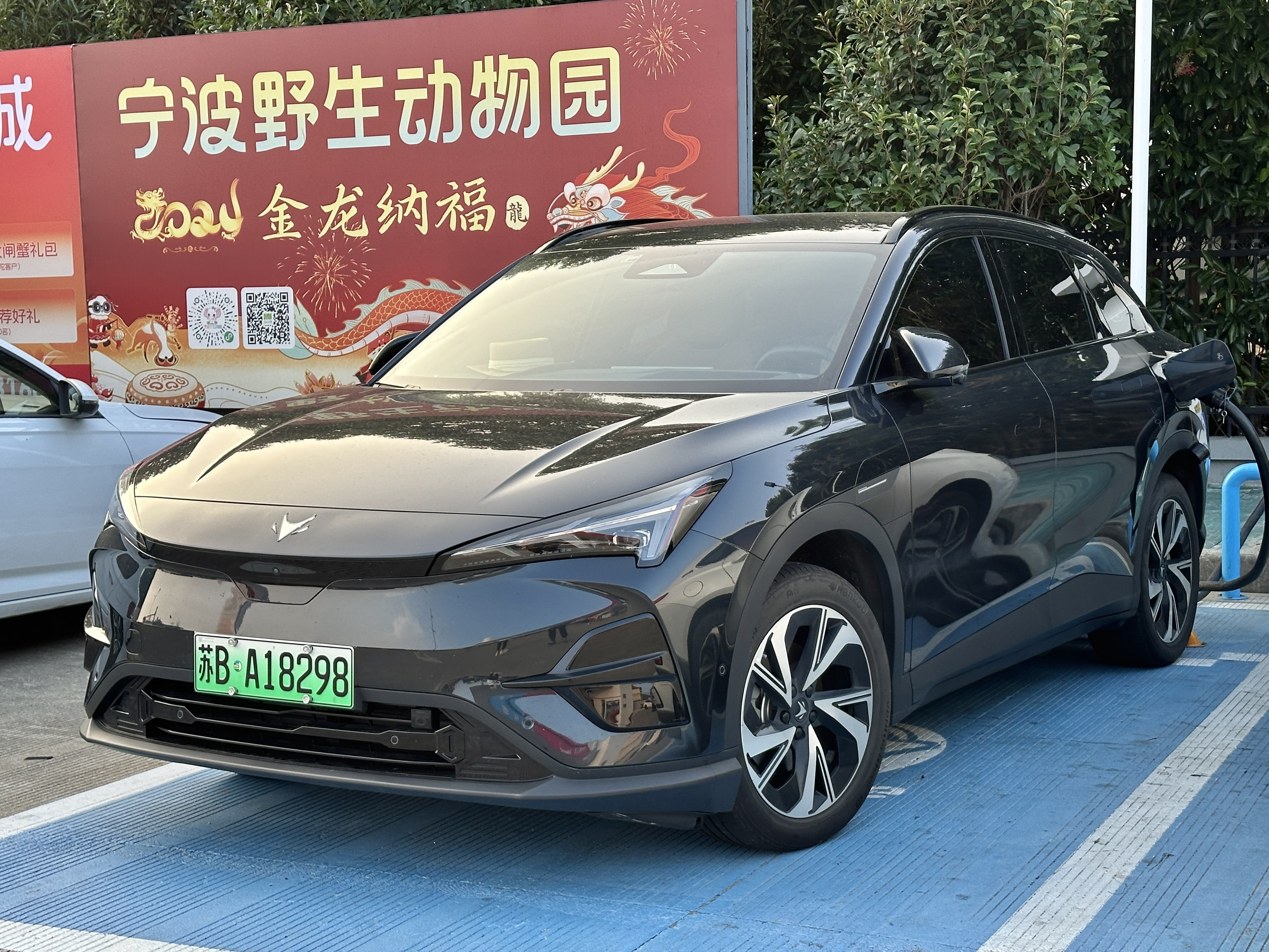
Arcfox αT5

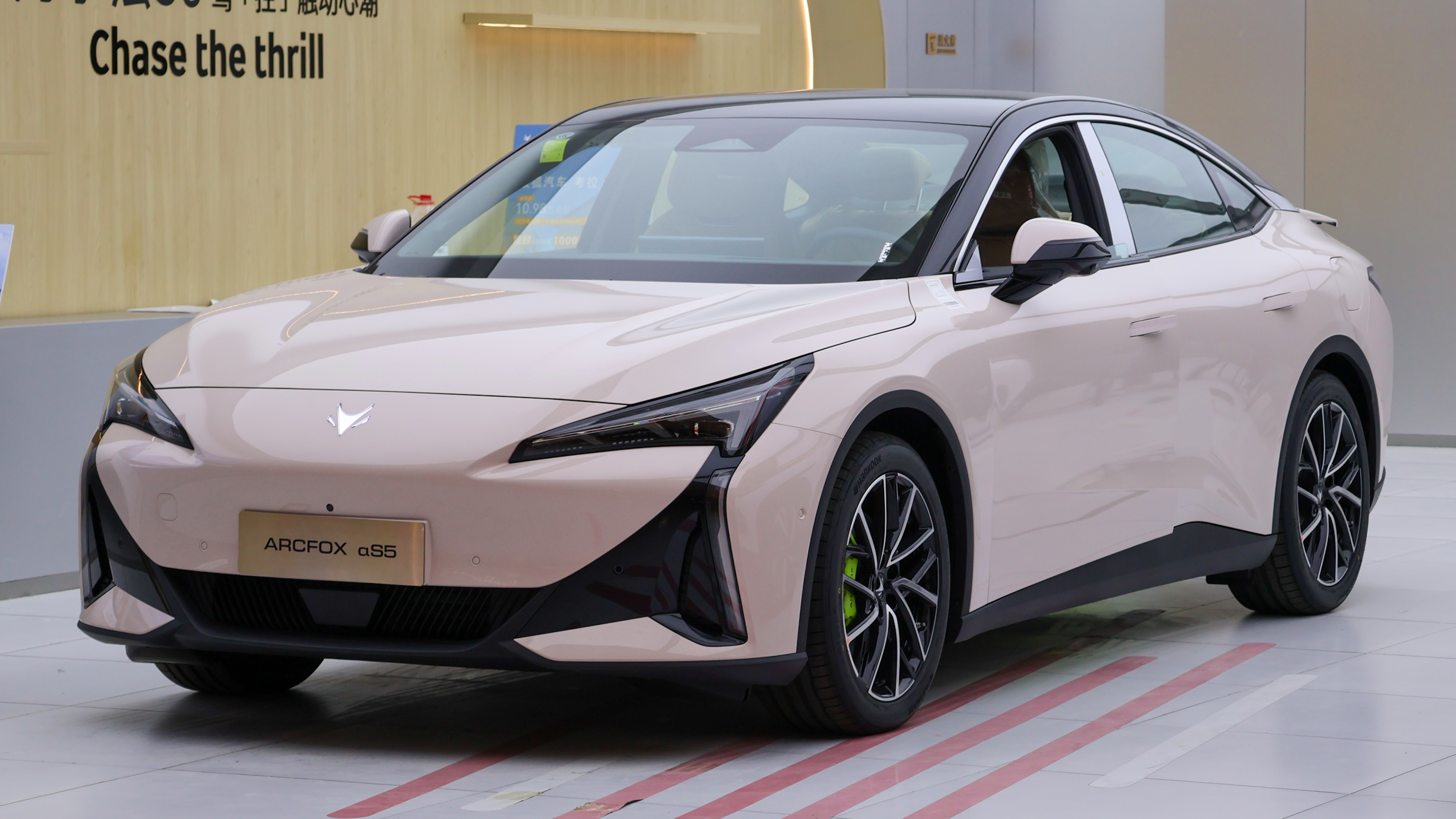
Arcfox αS5

=== Stelato ===
Stelato is the brand Huawei collaborates with BAIC BluePark, a subsidiary of BAIC Group.

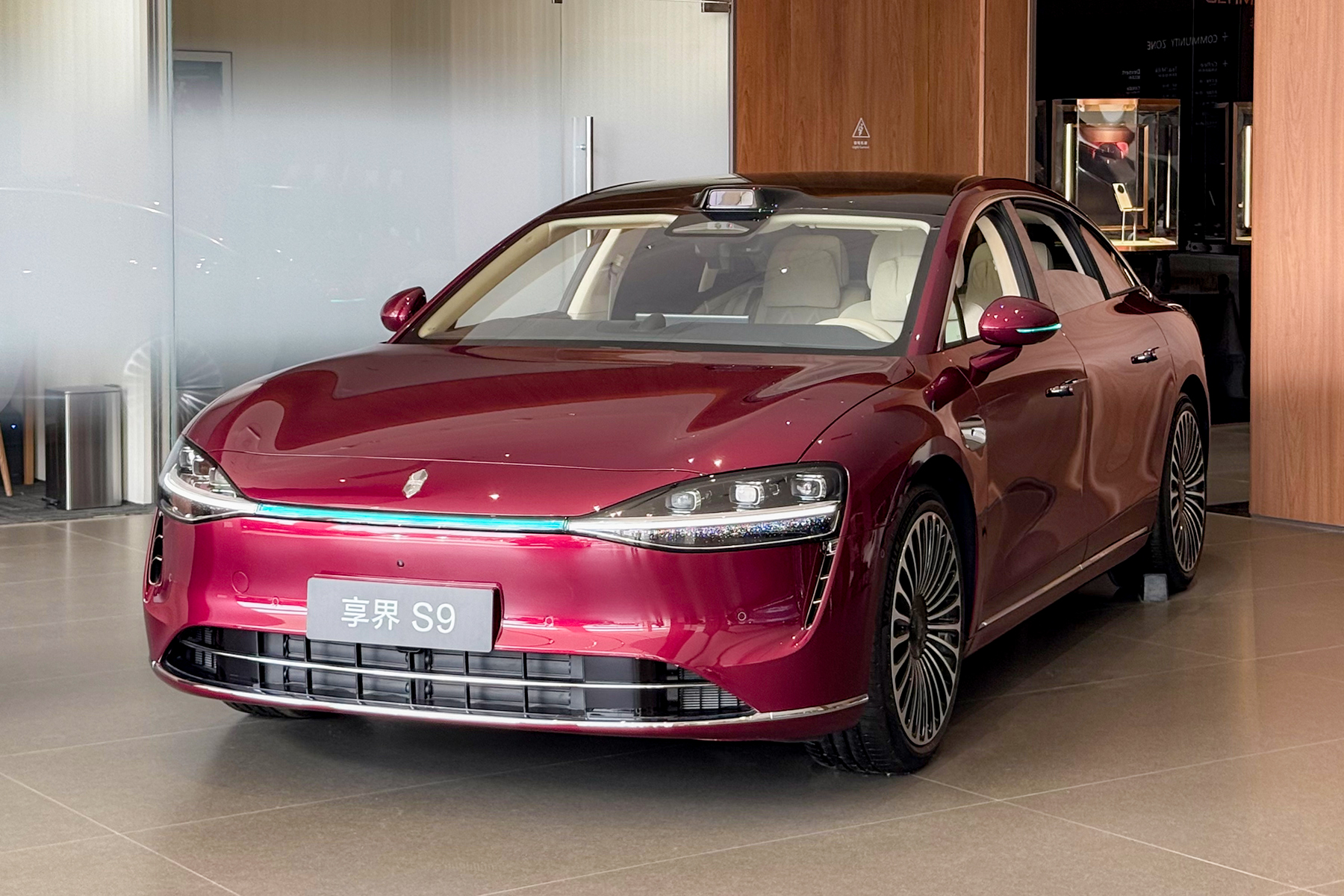
Stelato S9

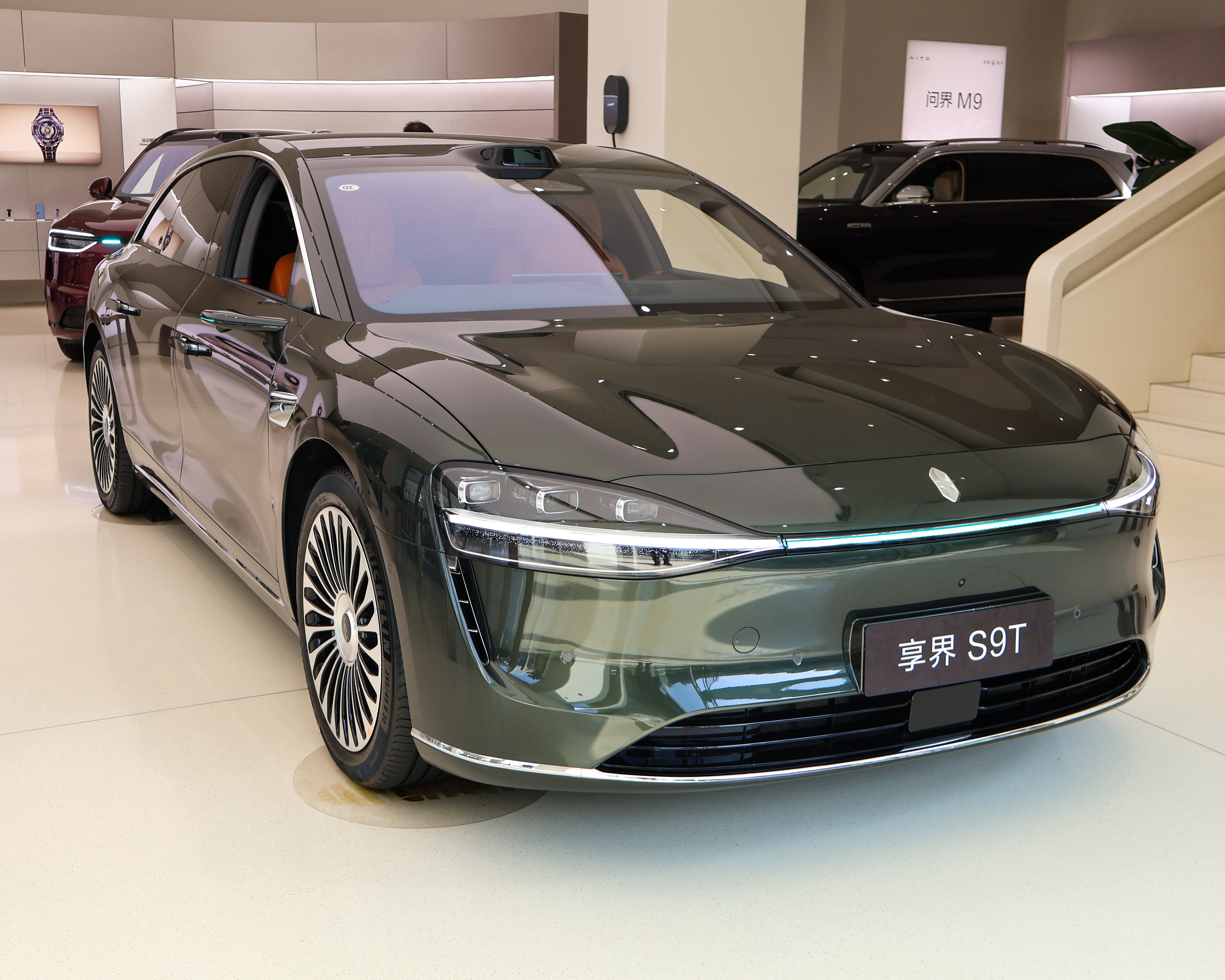
Stelato S9T

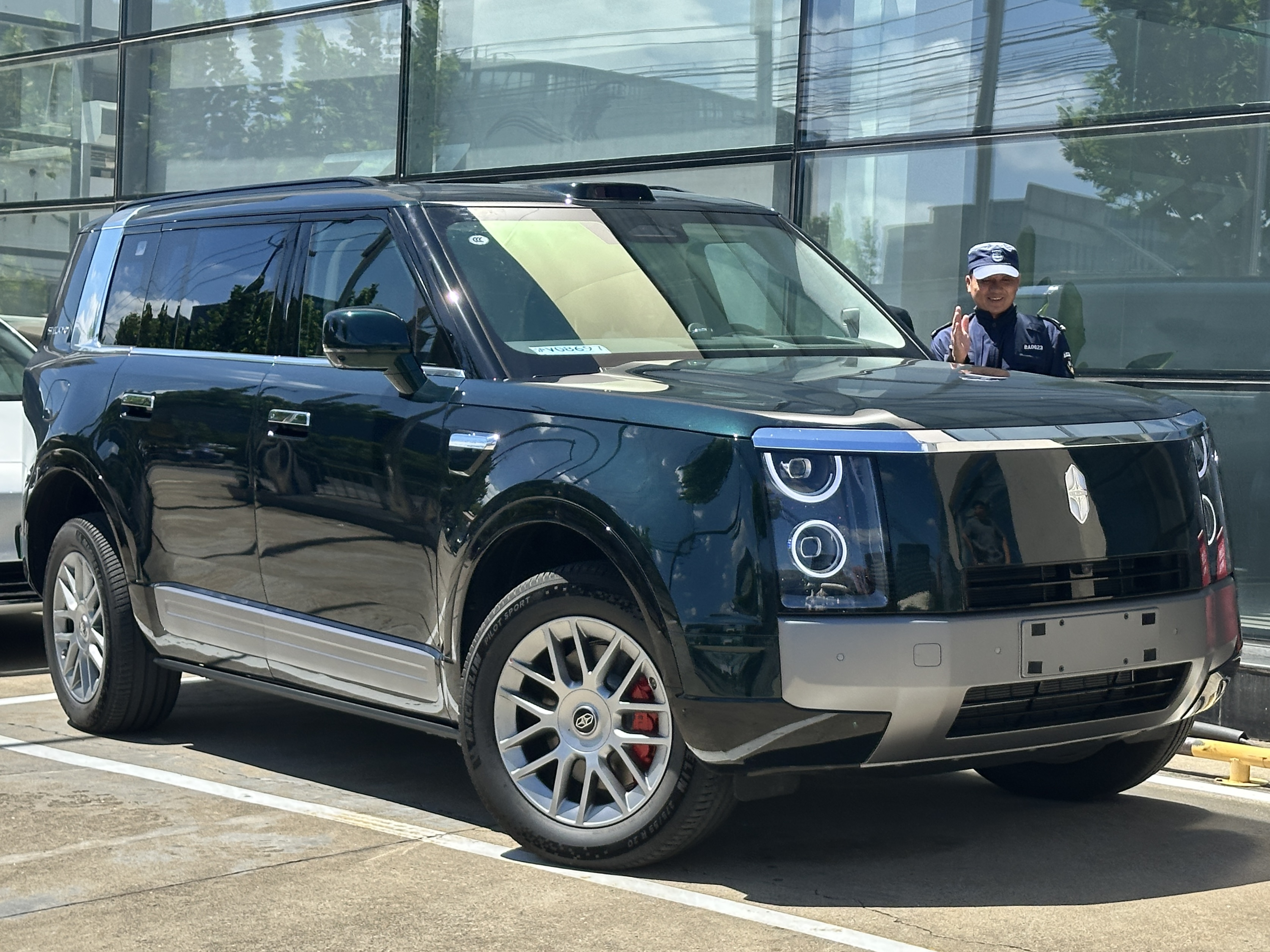
Stelato G9

=== Beijing ===
Beijing (北京汽车) is BAIC Motor's major brand, revived in 2020 after BAIC Group discontinued its Senova brand. All the former Senova vehicles were renamed to Beijing brand since then. Beijing Motor will reorganize the product layout of its three major series in 2023. That is to say, it will focus on the main channel of SUVs, supplemented by sedans and crossovers, including multiple levels and multiple power sources.

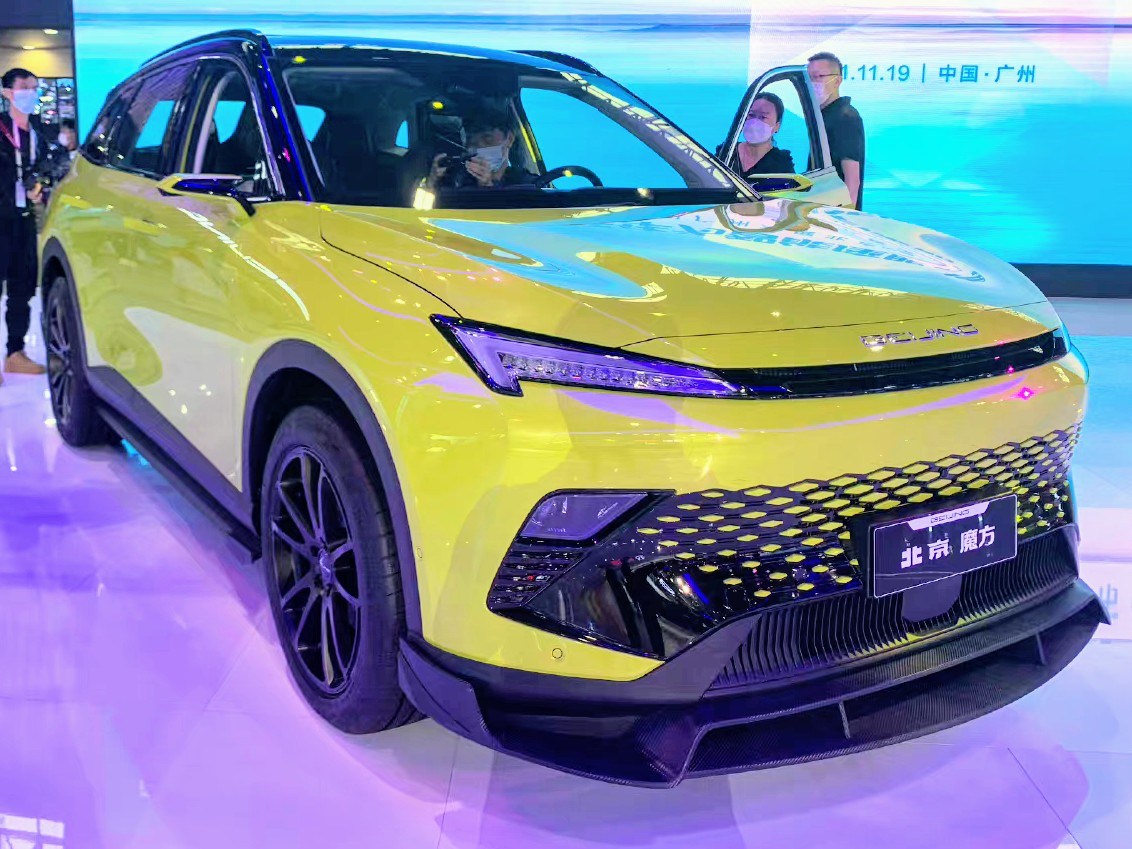
Beijing X6

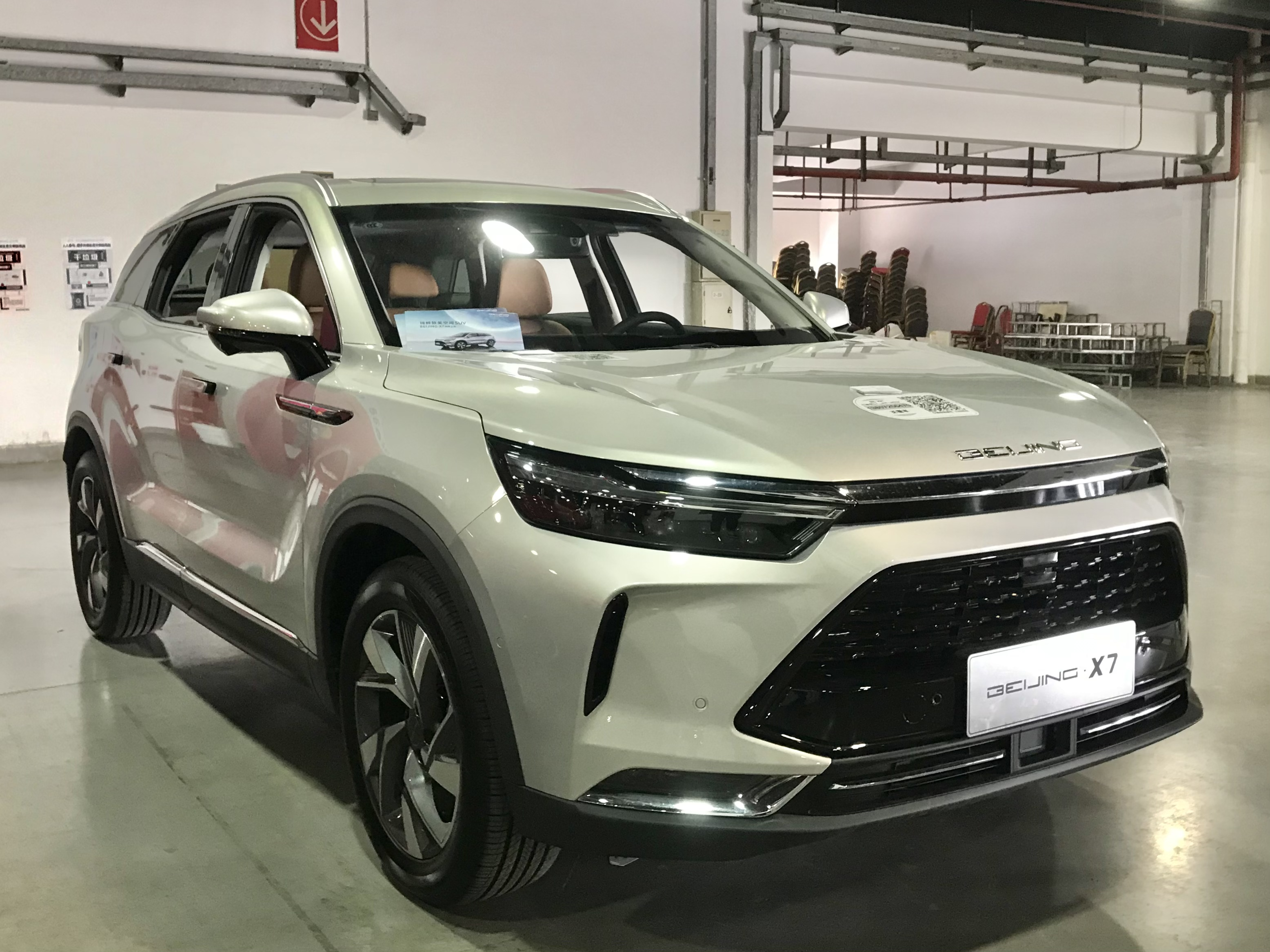
Beijing X7

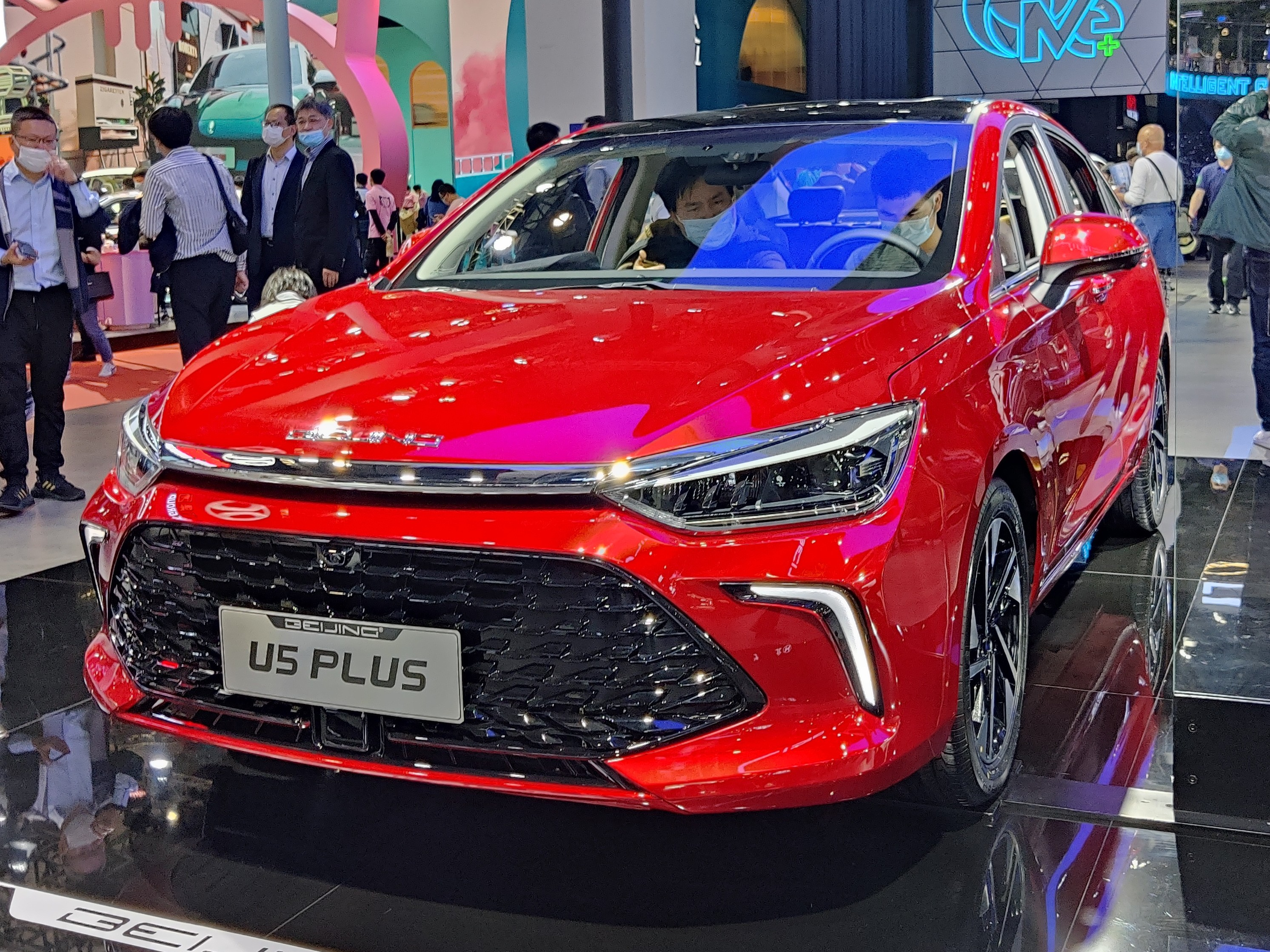
Beijing U5 Plus

=== Beijing Off-road ===
Logo of Beijing Off-road

Beijing Off-road (北京越野), operated by the fully owned subsidiary, the BAIC Group Off-road Vehicle Co., Ltd., The Beijing Off-road used to be a department of BAIC Motor, but later was acquired back into BAIC Group and independently operated since 2019.

- Beijing BJ30 (2015–present), compact SUV
  - Beijing BJ30e (2024–present), EREV variant of BJ30
- Beijing BJ40 (2014–present), compact SUV
  - Beijing F40 (2019–2023), pickup variant of Beijing BJ40
- Beijing BJ60 (2022–present), full-size SUV
  - Beijing BJ60e (2024–present), EREV variant of BJ60
  - Beijing Titan 700 (2026–present), Huawei Qiankun variant of BJ60
- Beijing BJ80 (2016–2025), mid-size SUV
- Beijing BJ90 (2016–2023), full-size SUV
- Beijing Xingtan 5X (upcoming), mid-size SUV
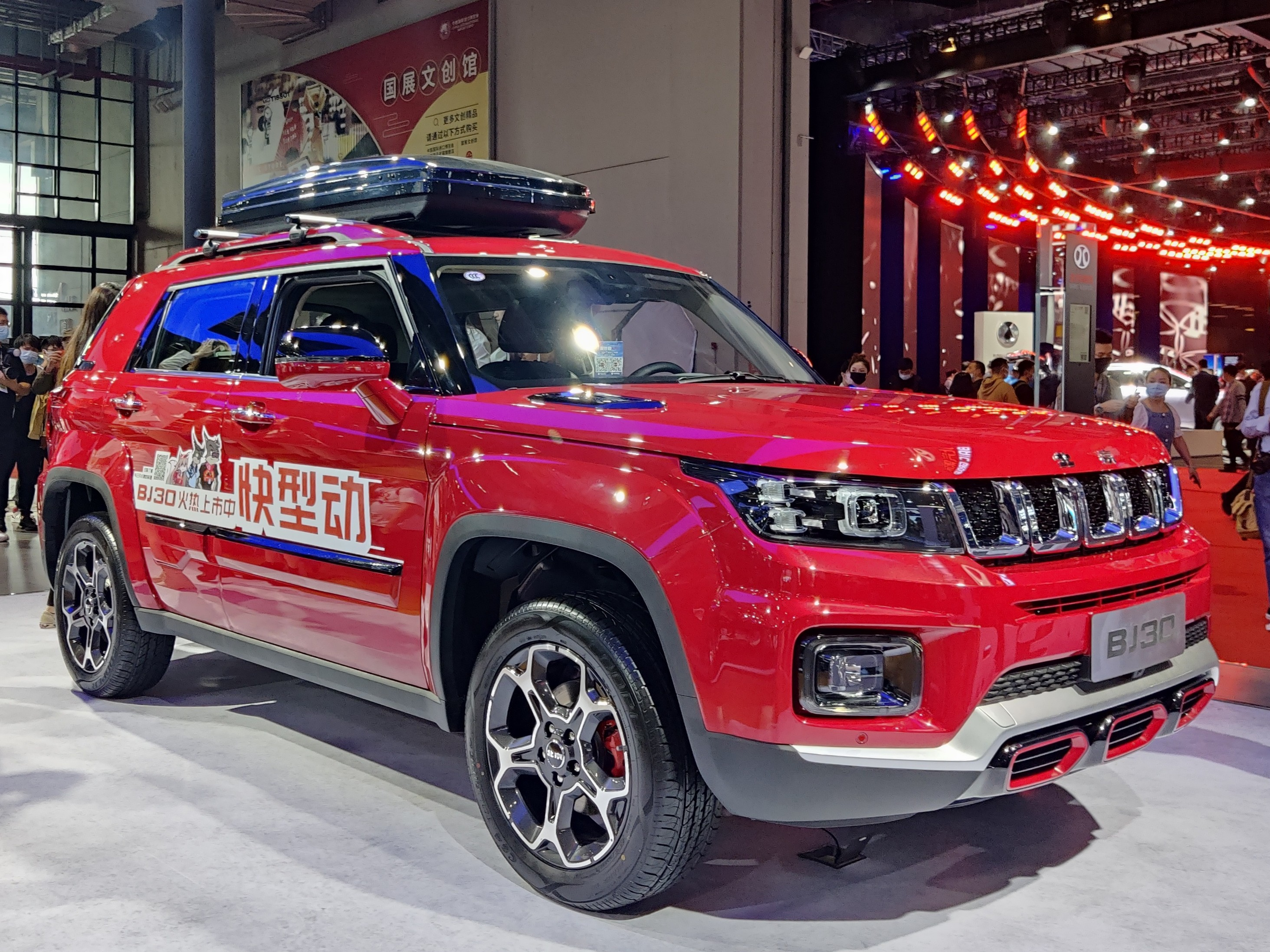
Beijing BJ30

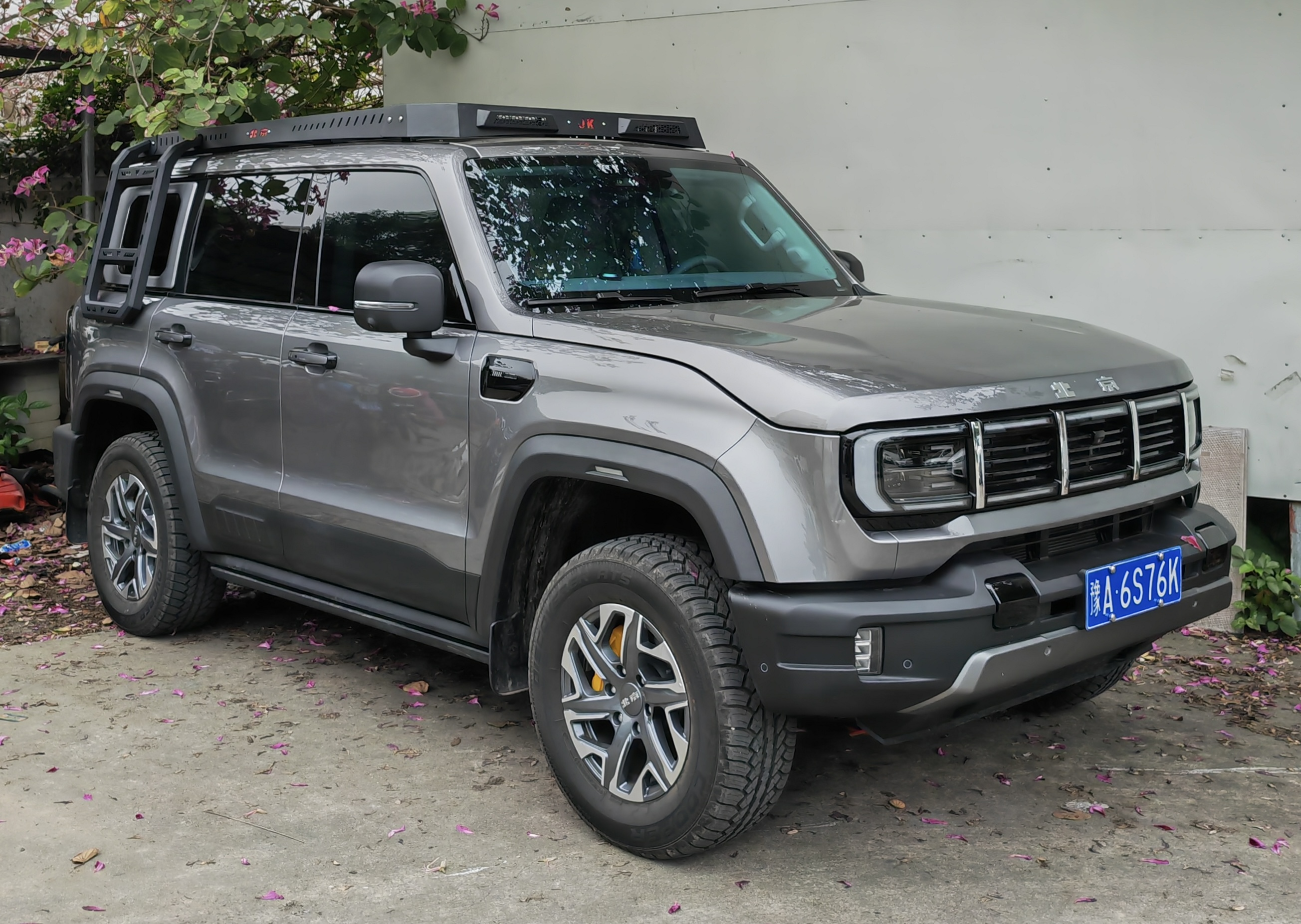
Beijing BJ40

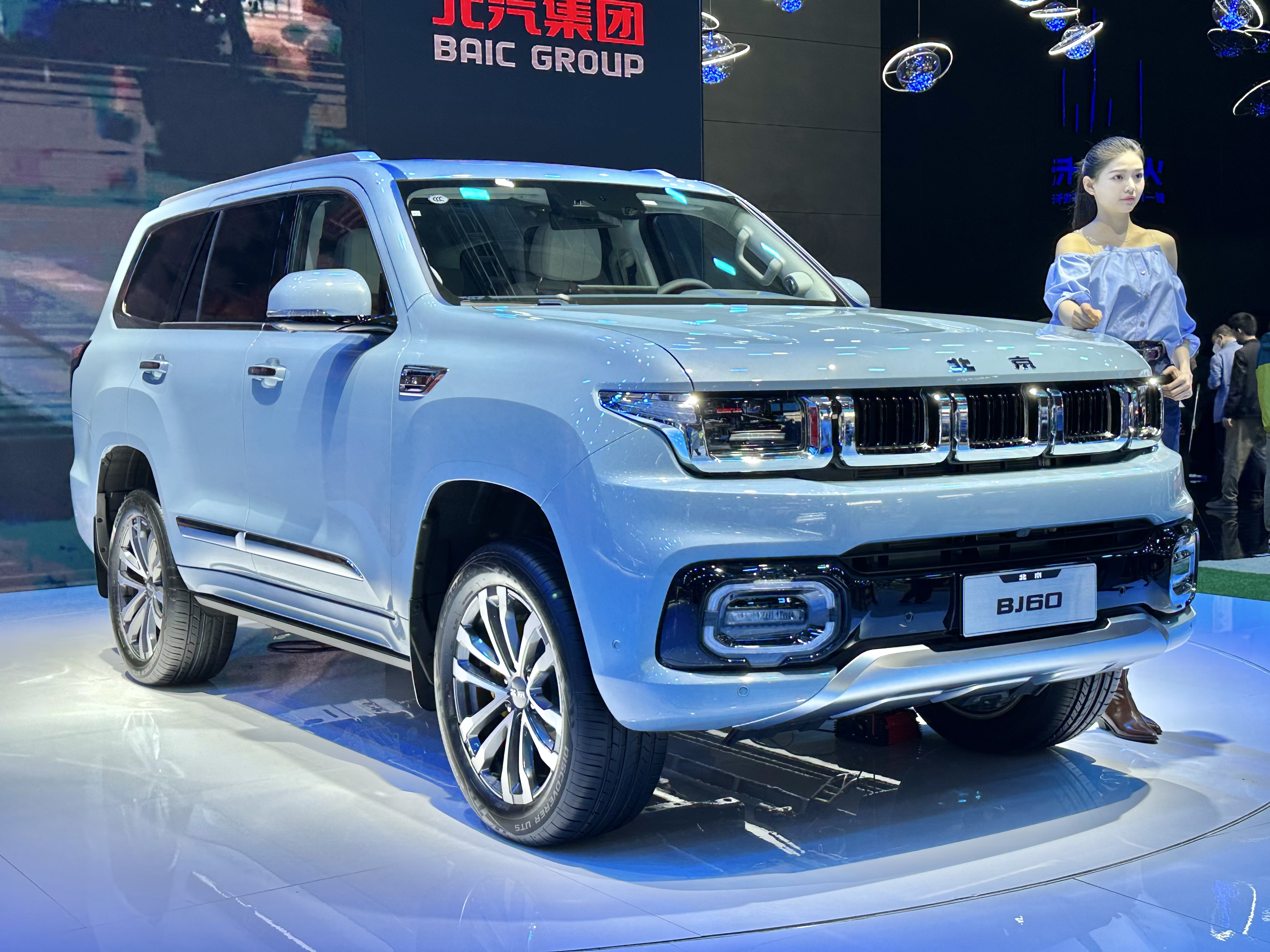
Beijing BJ60

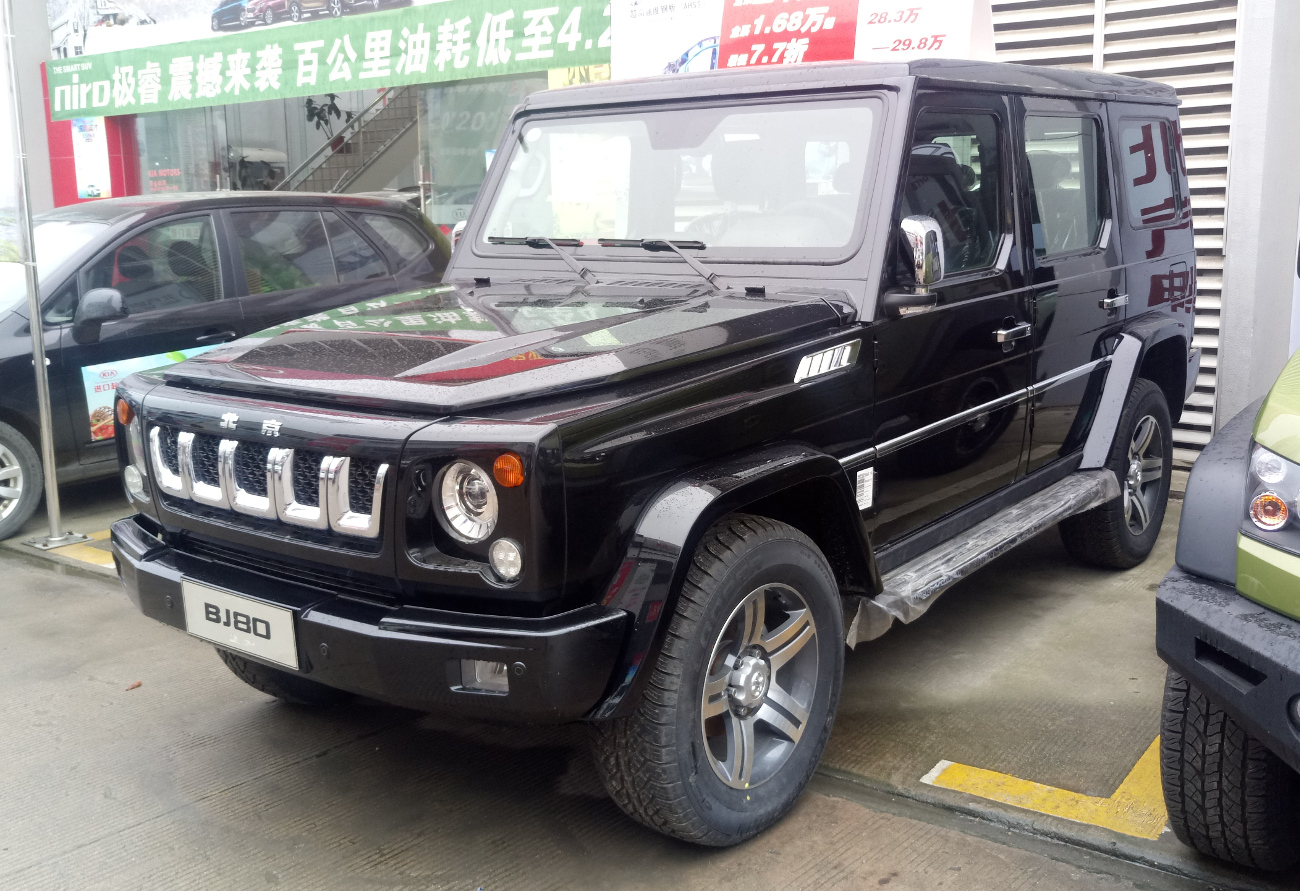
Beijing BJ80

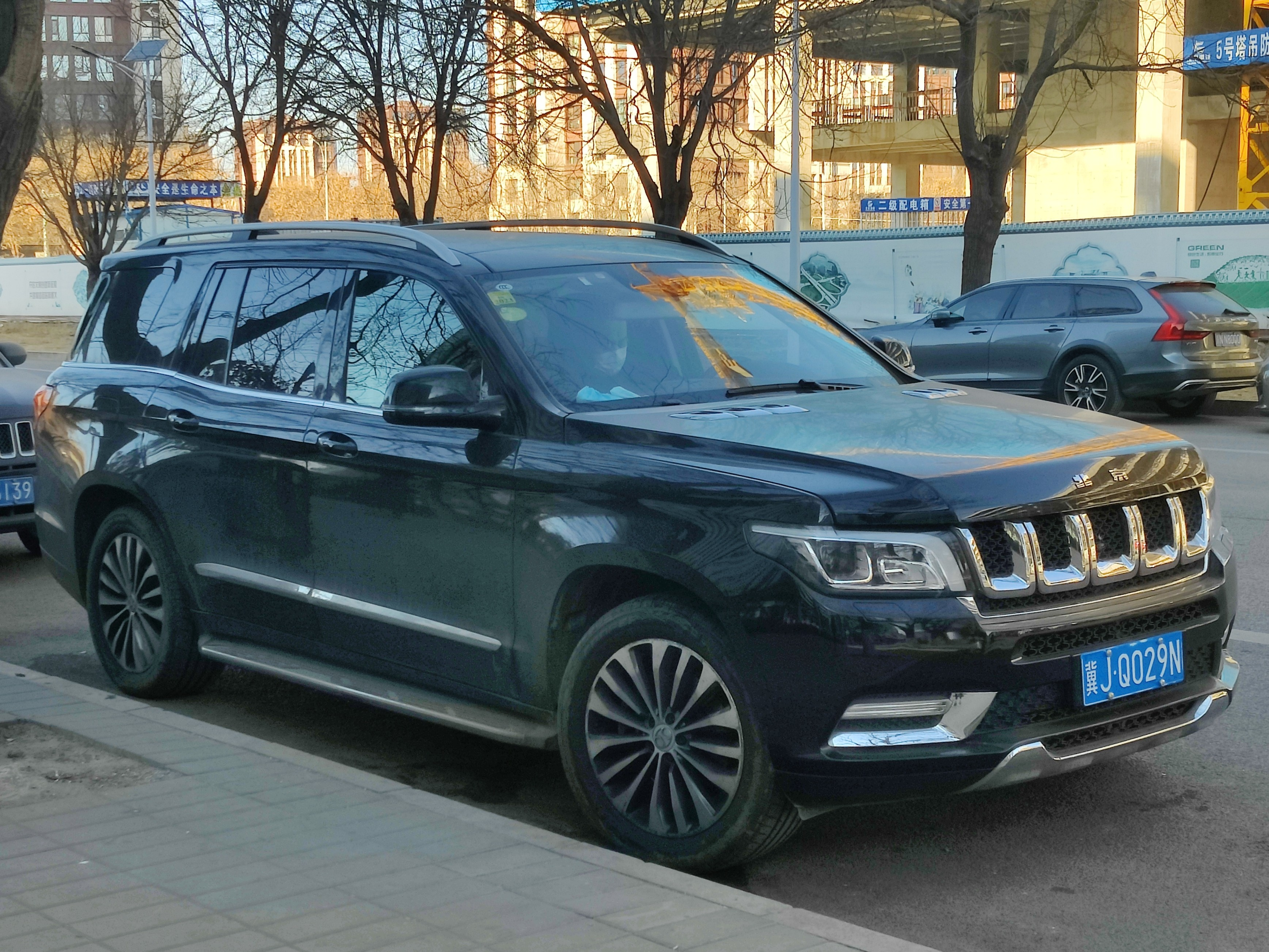
Beijing BJ90

=== BJEV/Beijing EV ===
With the Beijing Electric Vehicle Co., Ltd. (BAIC BJEV) was reconsolidated into BAIC BluePark, the battery electric vehicle of Beijing brand, like Beijing EU5, Beijing EU7, are also operated by BAIC BluePark at present.

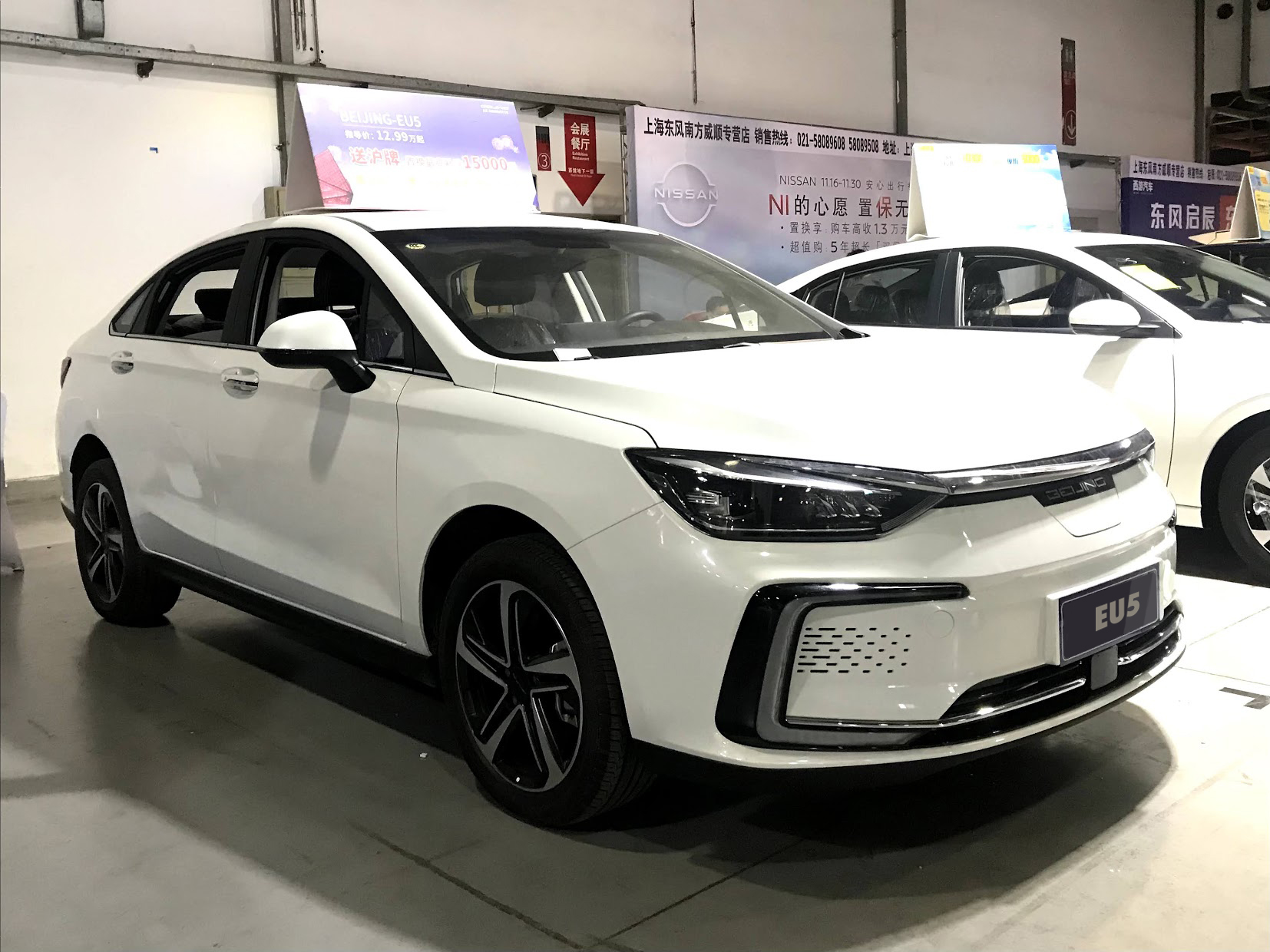
Beijing EU5

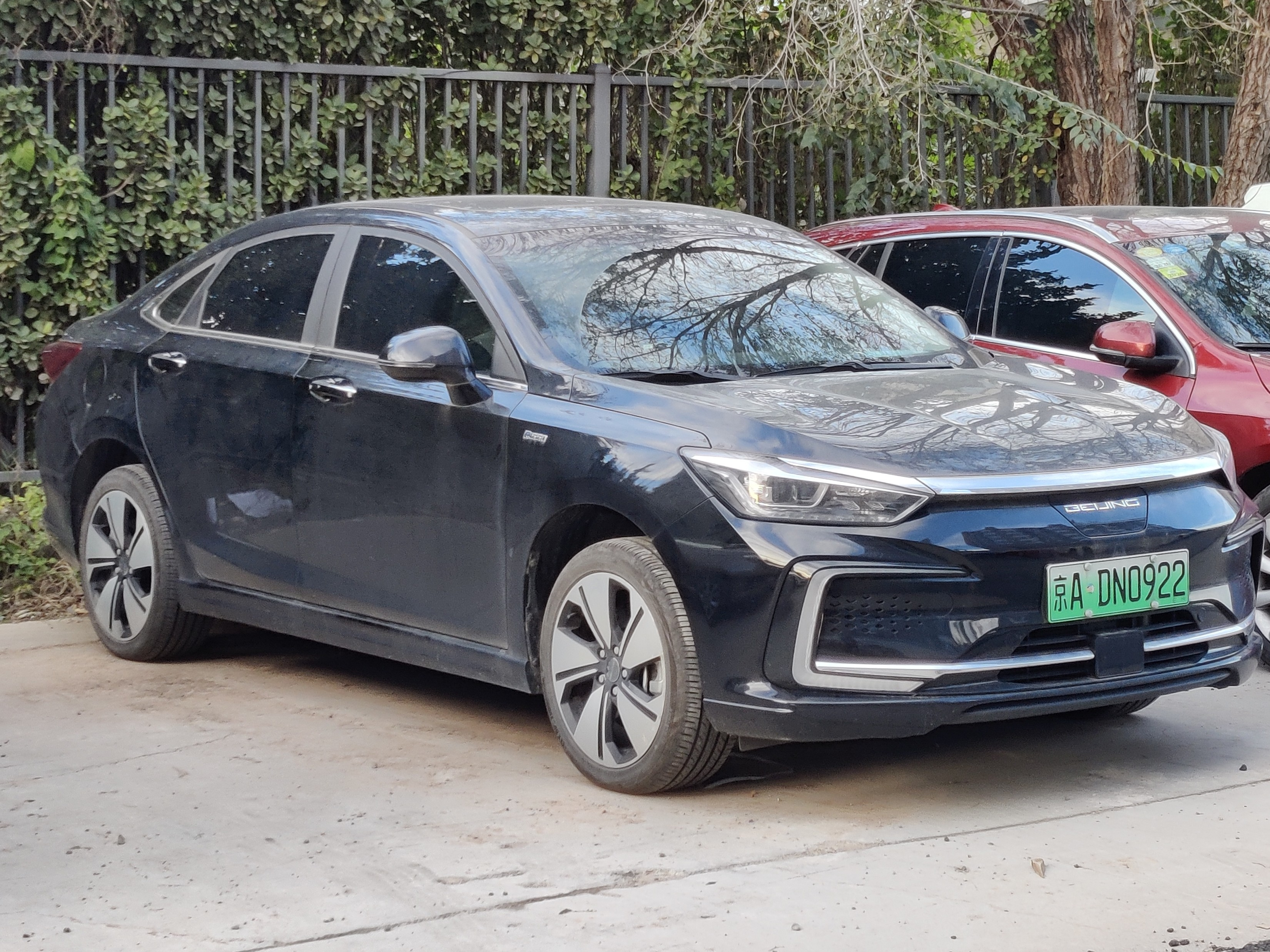
Beijing EU7

=== Foton ===
Beiqi Foton Motor Co., Ltd. (Foton Motor) is a subsidiary of BAIC which designs and manufactures trucks, buses, sport utility vehicles, and agricultural machinery. It is headquartered in Changping, Beijing.

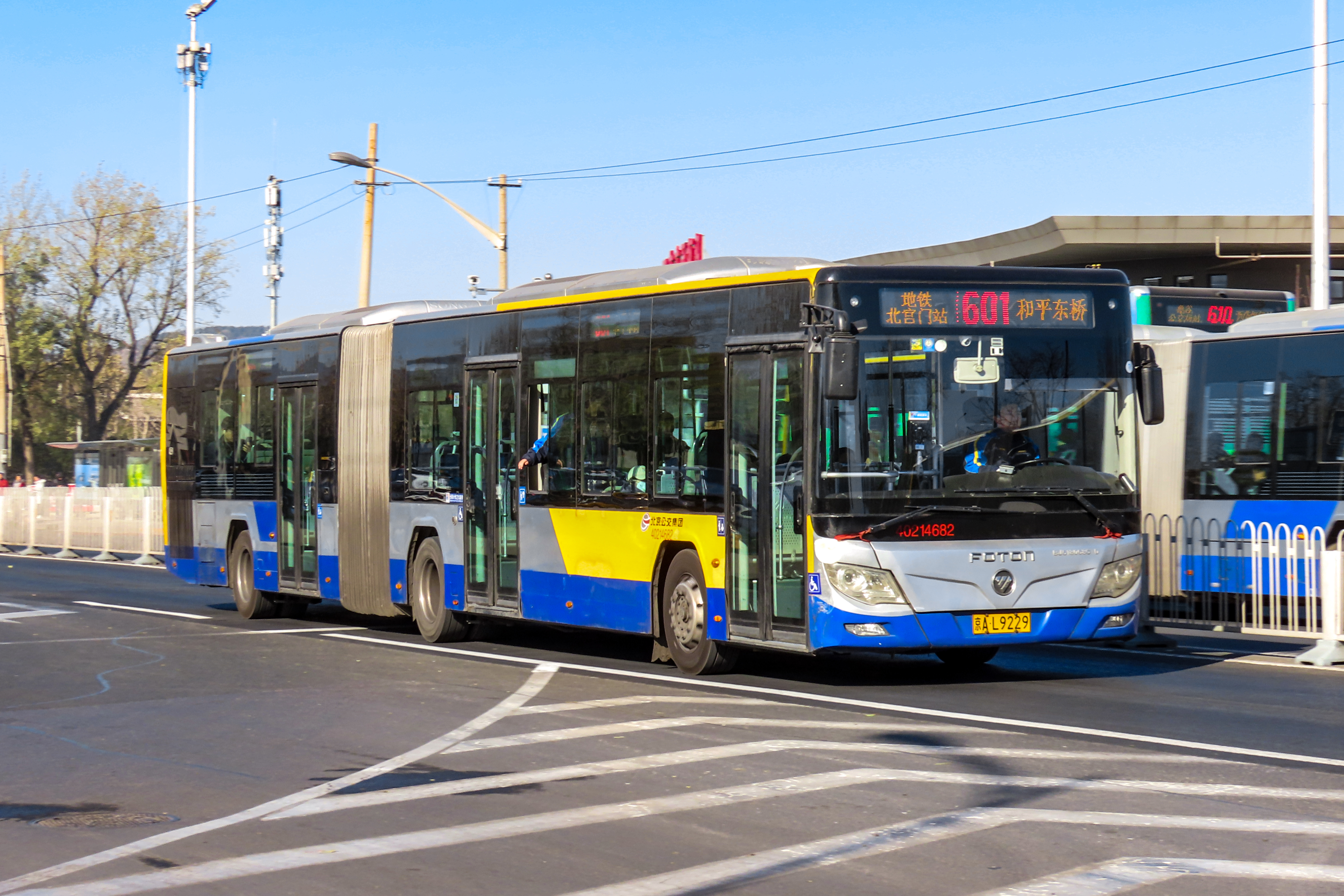
Foton BJ6180C8CTD LNG bus

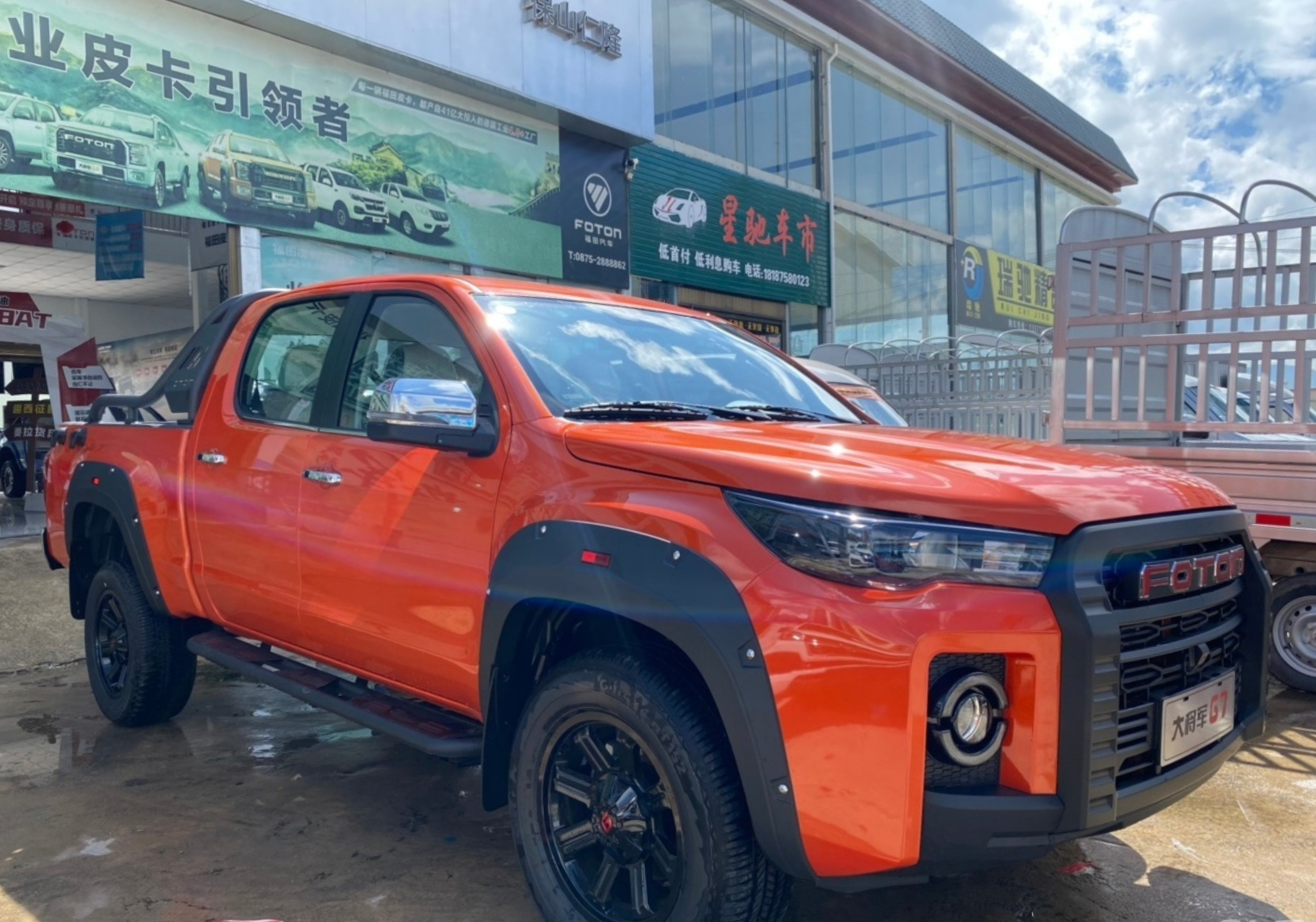
Foton Grand General G7

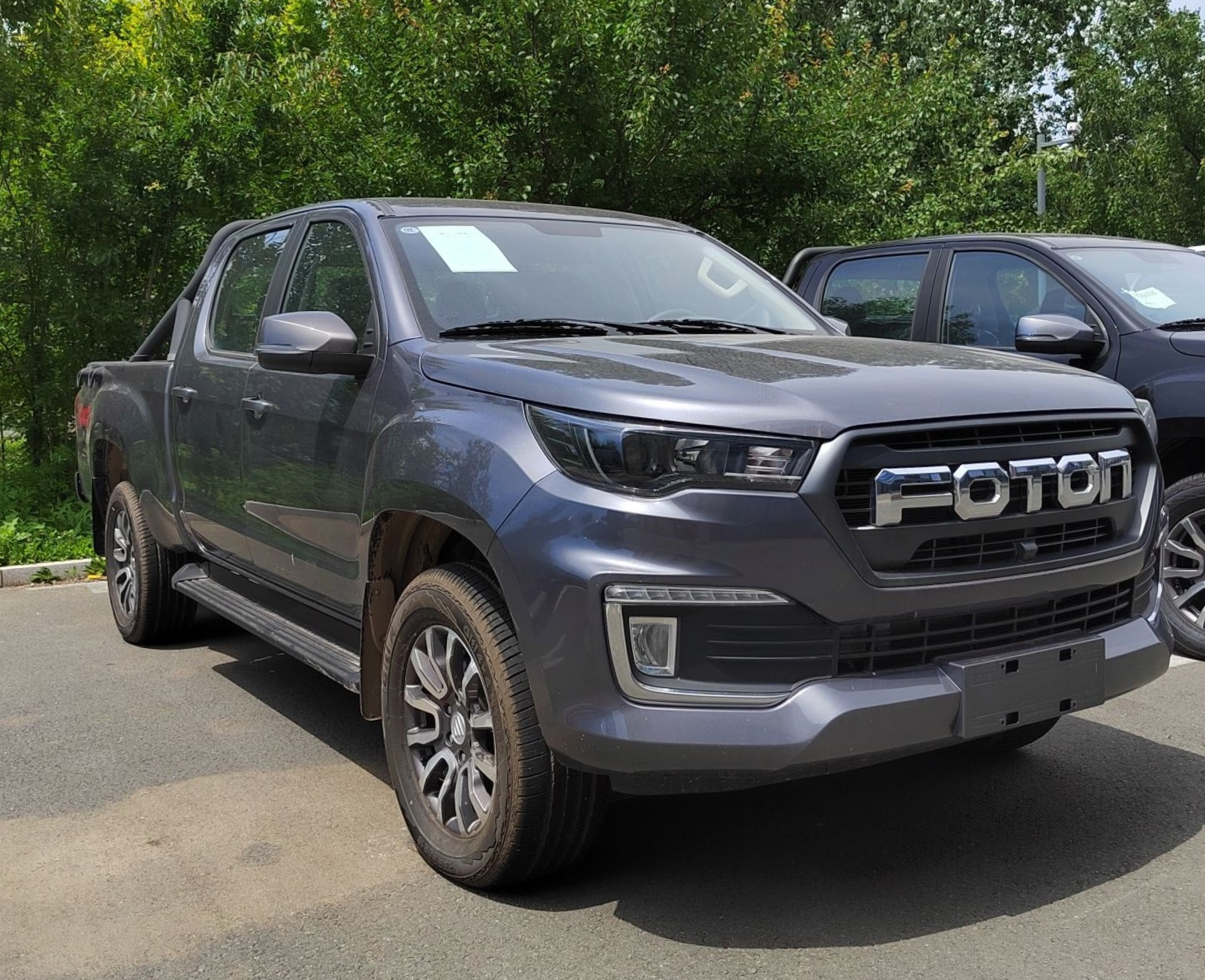
Foton Tunland Yutu

=== Ruili ===
Ruili is a sub-division of BAIC. They produce their vehicles under the Doda brand.

==== Current models ====
- Ruili Doda EV160
- Ruili Doda V8 (rebadged Joylong iFly)
- Ruili Doda V2 (rebadged Weiwang M20)
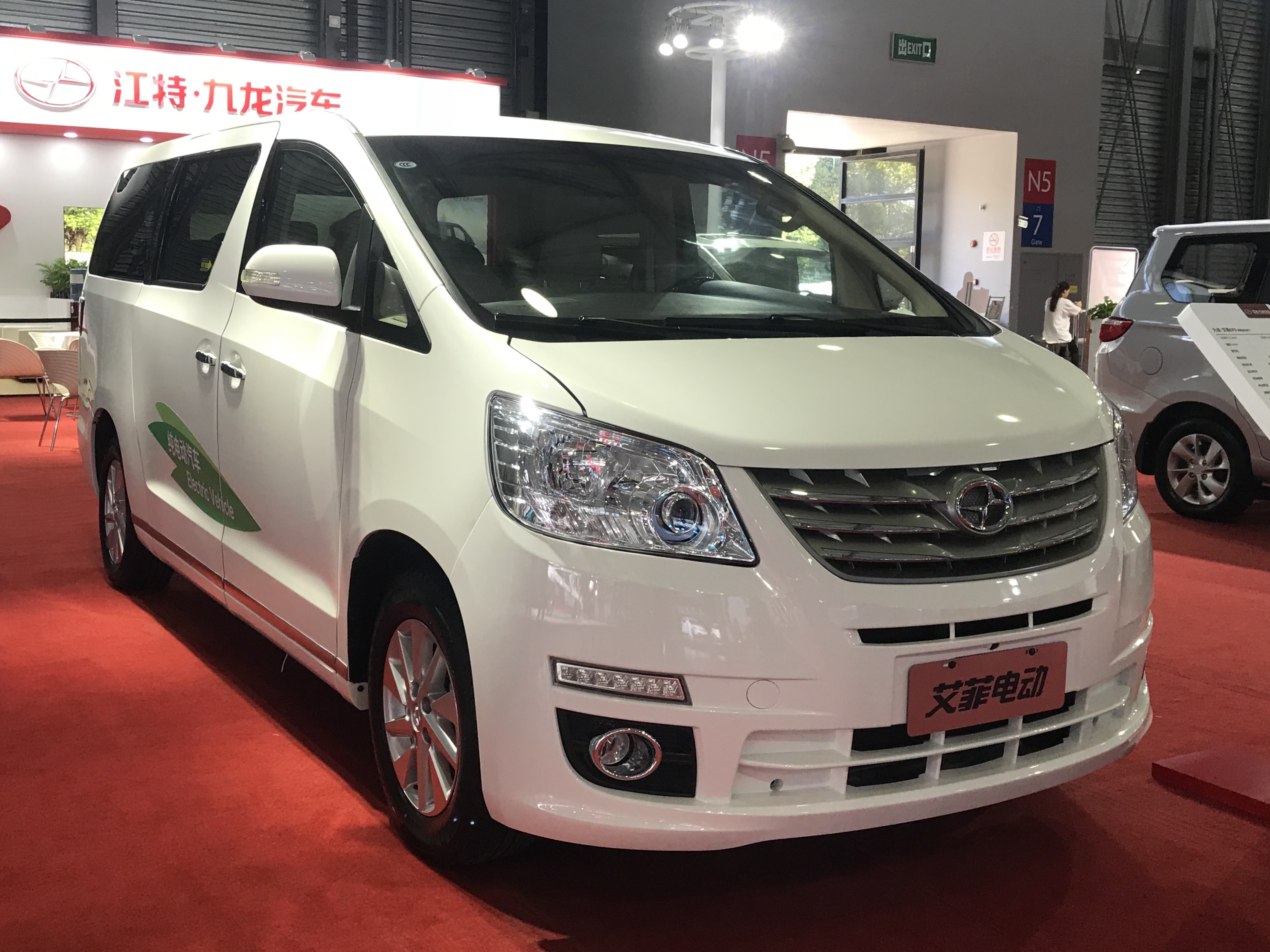
Ruili Doda V8

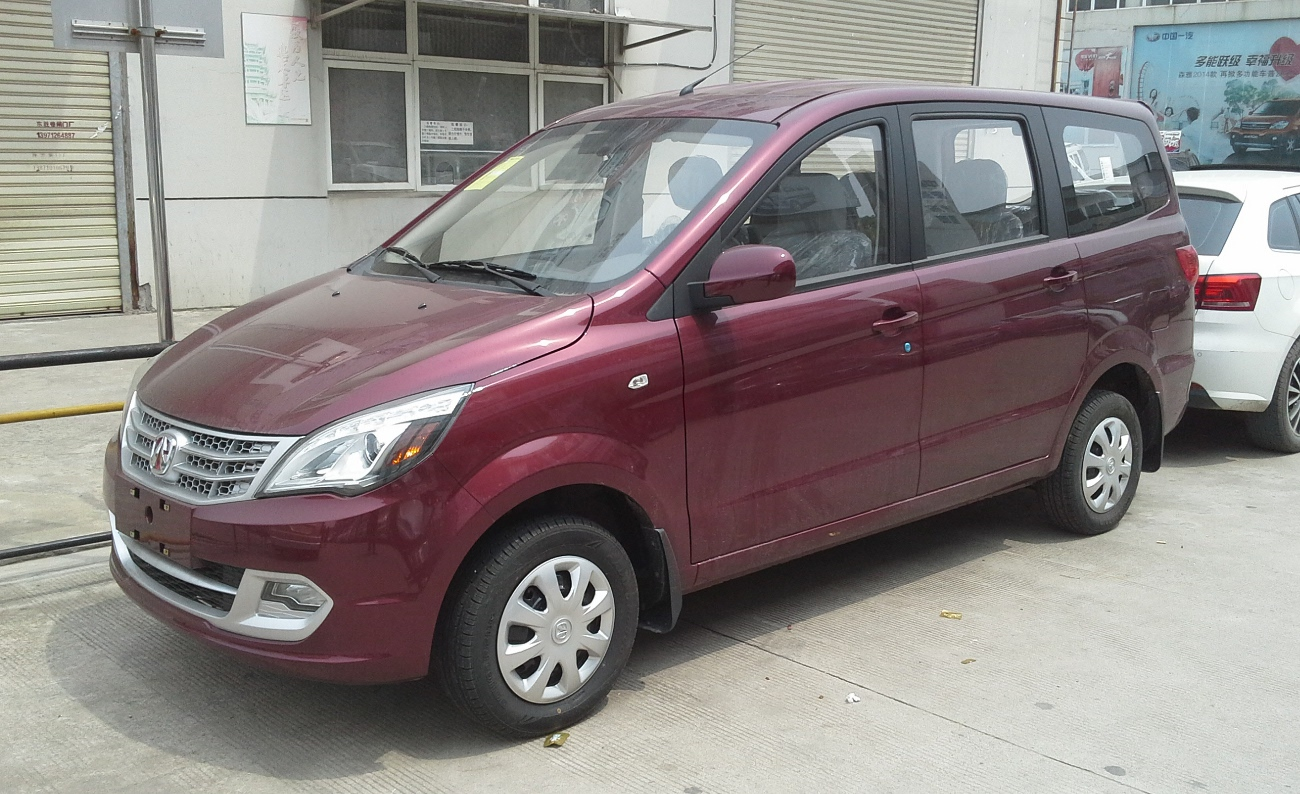
Ruili Doda V2

== Former subsidiaries or brands ==
=== BAW ===
Beijing Automobile Works Co., Ltd. (BAW), which produces light off-road vehicles, trucks, and military vehicles, used to be a subsidiary of BAIC Group but was sold to private sector since 2015.

In June 2024, BAIC Group issued a clarification statement. The statement mentioned that Beijing Automobile Works Co., Ltd. and BAIC Group have no equity or property rights relationships.

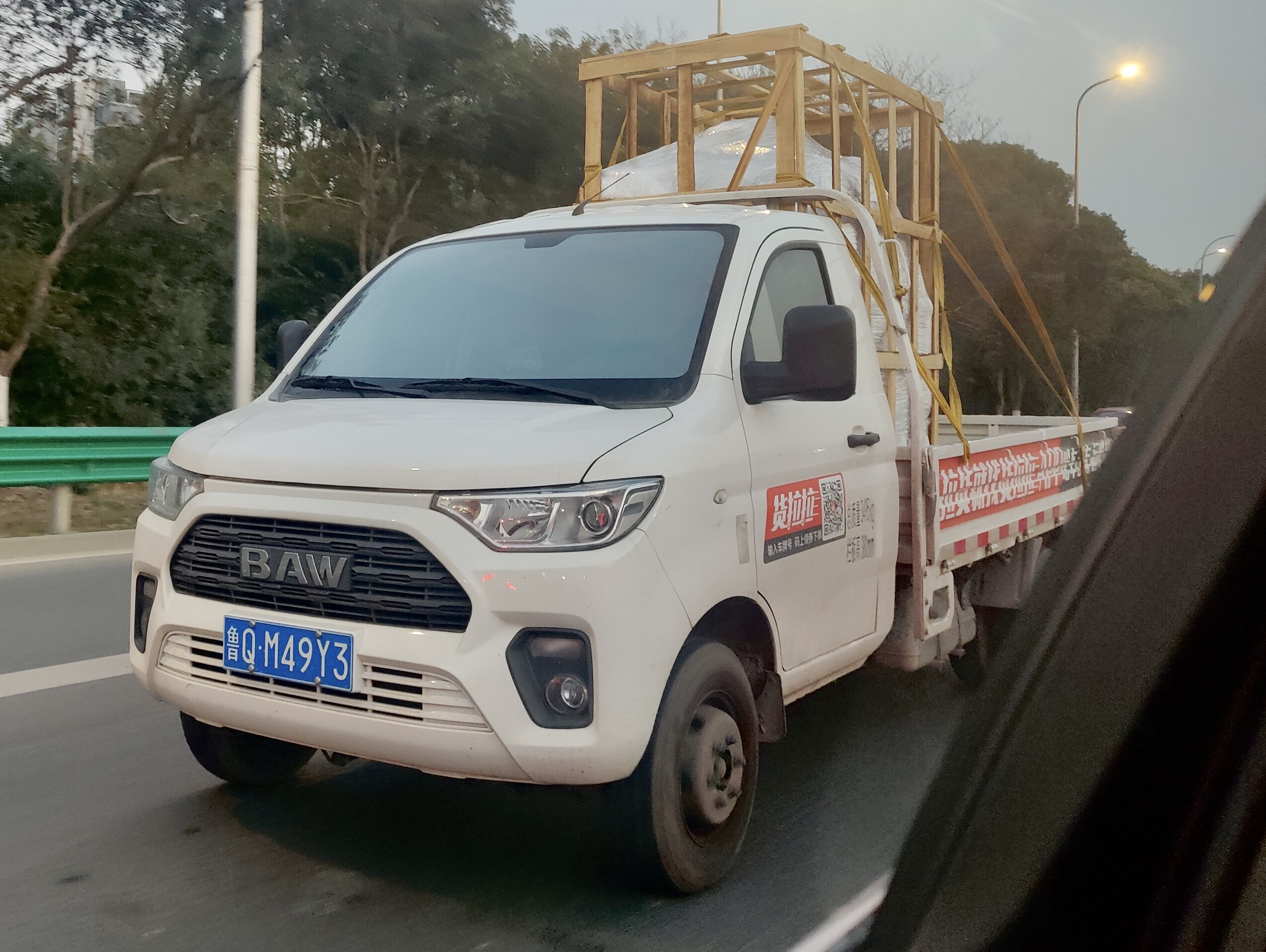
BAW Jingka T7

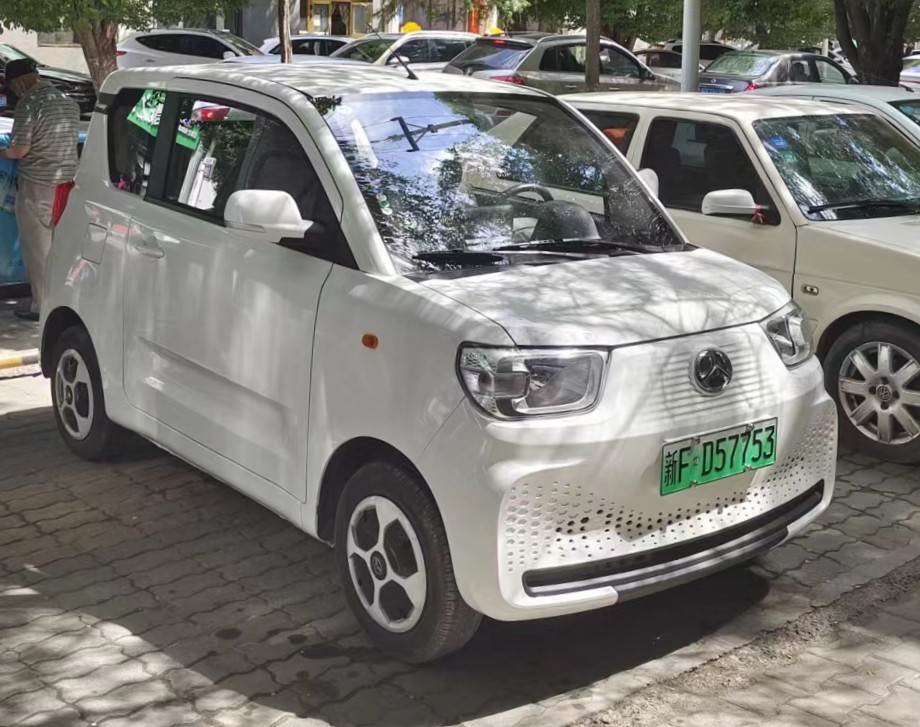
BAW Yuanbao

=== BLAC ===
The Beijing Light Automobile Company (BLAC), until 1988 the Beijing Automobile Factory No. 2, started in the late 1960s when production of the independently developed BJ130 began. Its introduction was slowed considerably by the upheavals of the Cultural revolution. In 1984, assembly of the Isuzu Elf/NHR began (originally as the BJ136, later as the BJ1030/1040/1050 series). In 1988, a new plant for these trucks was built with aid from the Japanese, and petrol and diesel light truck engines were also produced. BLAC went bankrupt in 2002.

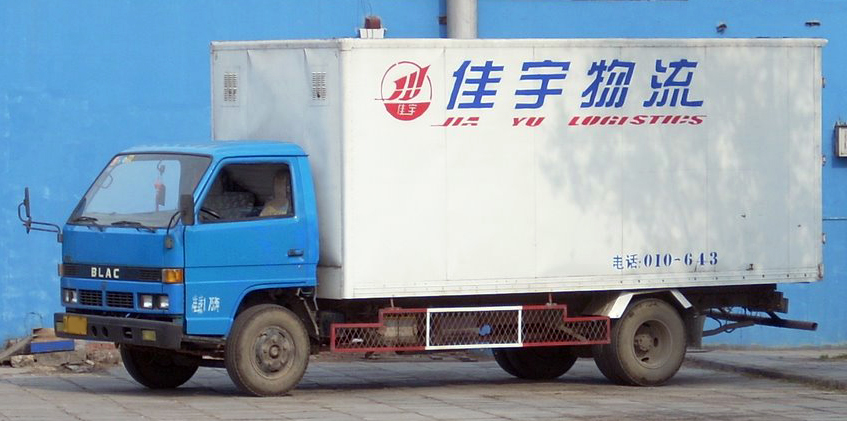
A BLAC truck

=== Changhe ===
In 2012, Changhe Automobile was acquired by BAIC Group and became a subsidiary. Changhe began to introduce new products based on BAIC's platforms. In mid-2022 all products were discontinued and the company's website ceased to be available.

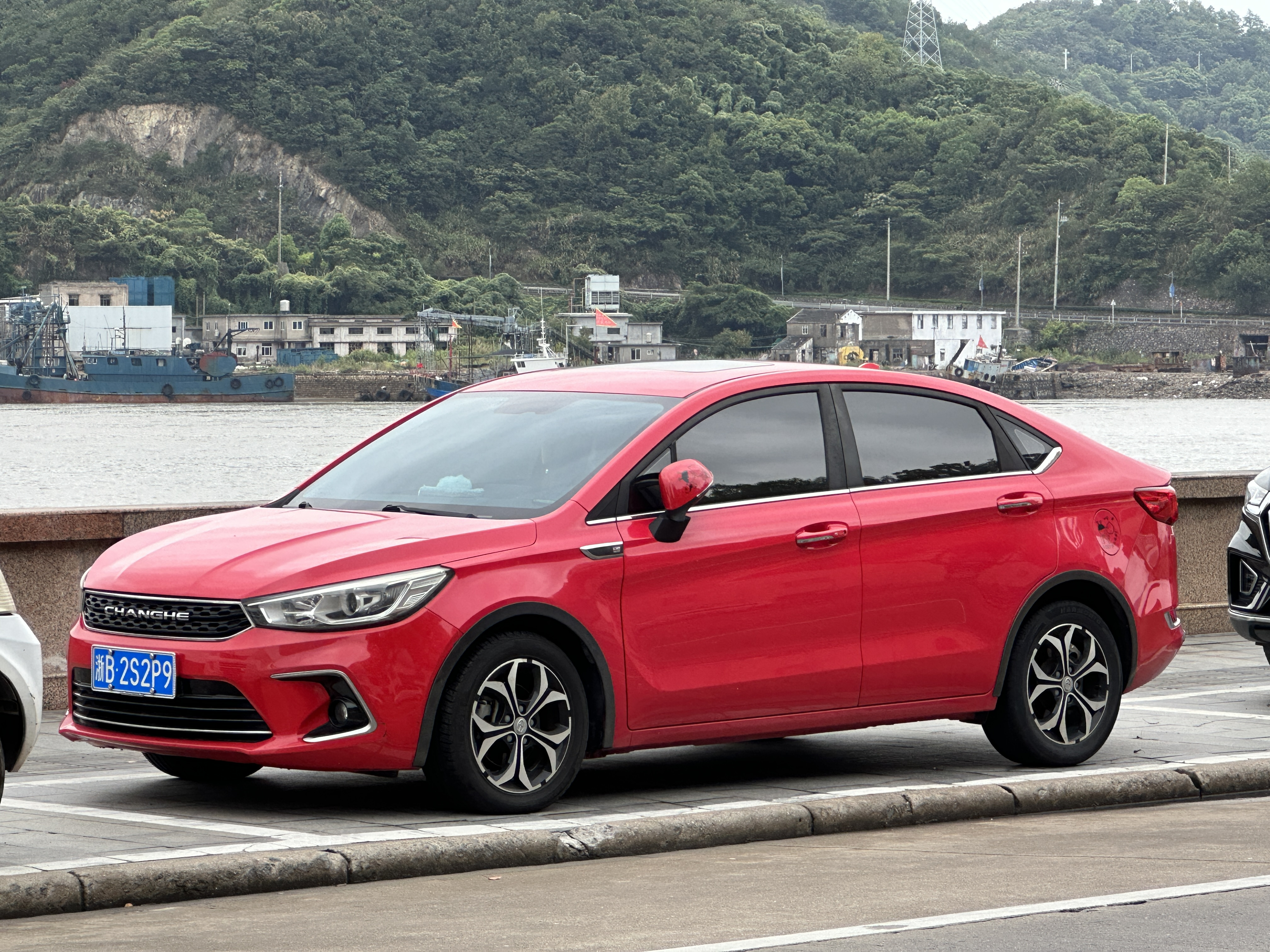
Changhe A6

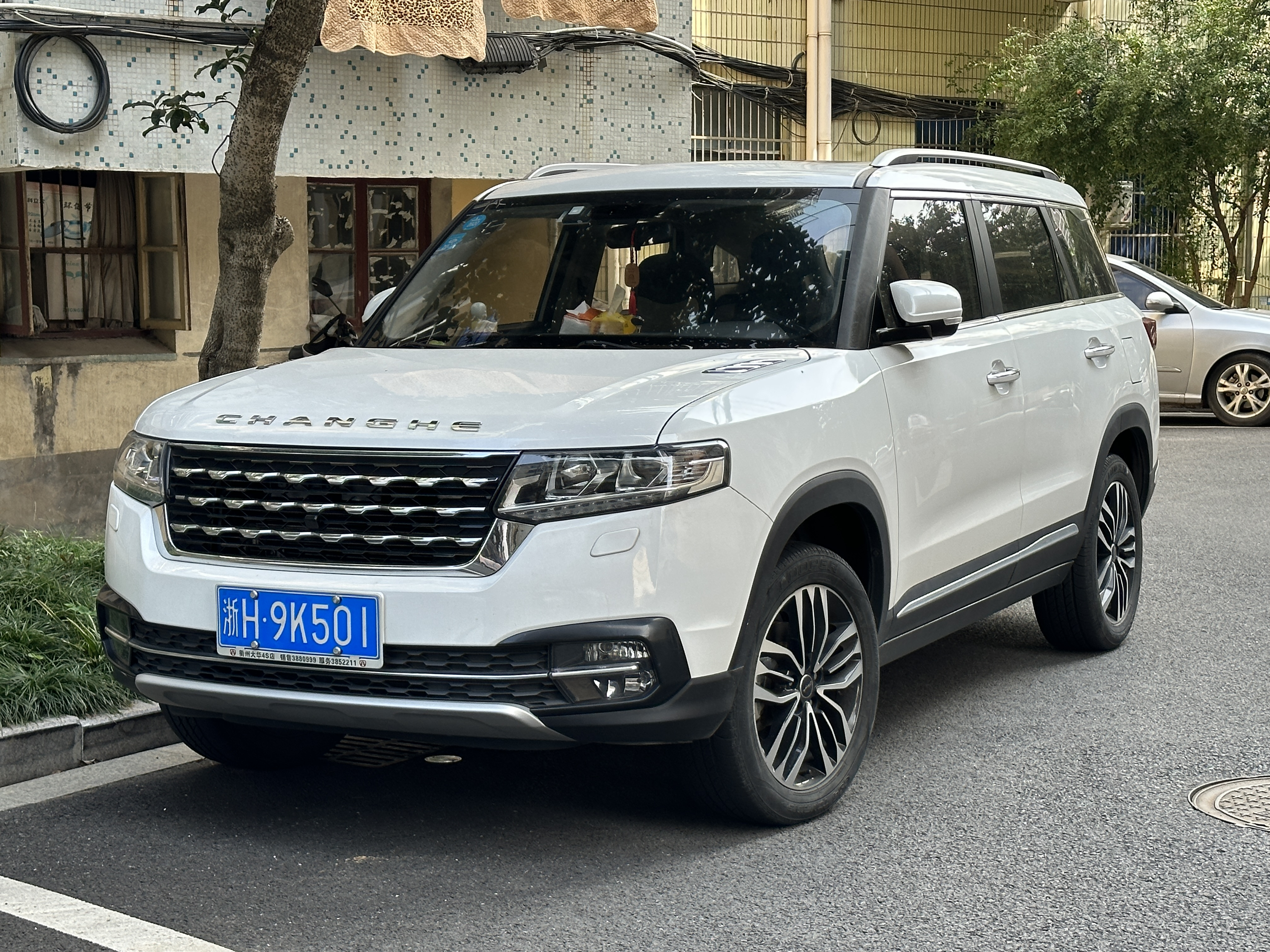
Changhe Q7

== Joint ventures ==
Like many other peers, BAIC has several joint ventures with foreign automakers—including two with Daimler AG.

=== Beijing Hyundai ===
Beijing Hyundai Motor Co., Ltd. is an automobile manufacturing company headquartered in Beijing, China, and is a 50:50 joint-venture between BAIC Motor and Hyundai Motor Company.

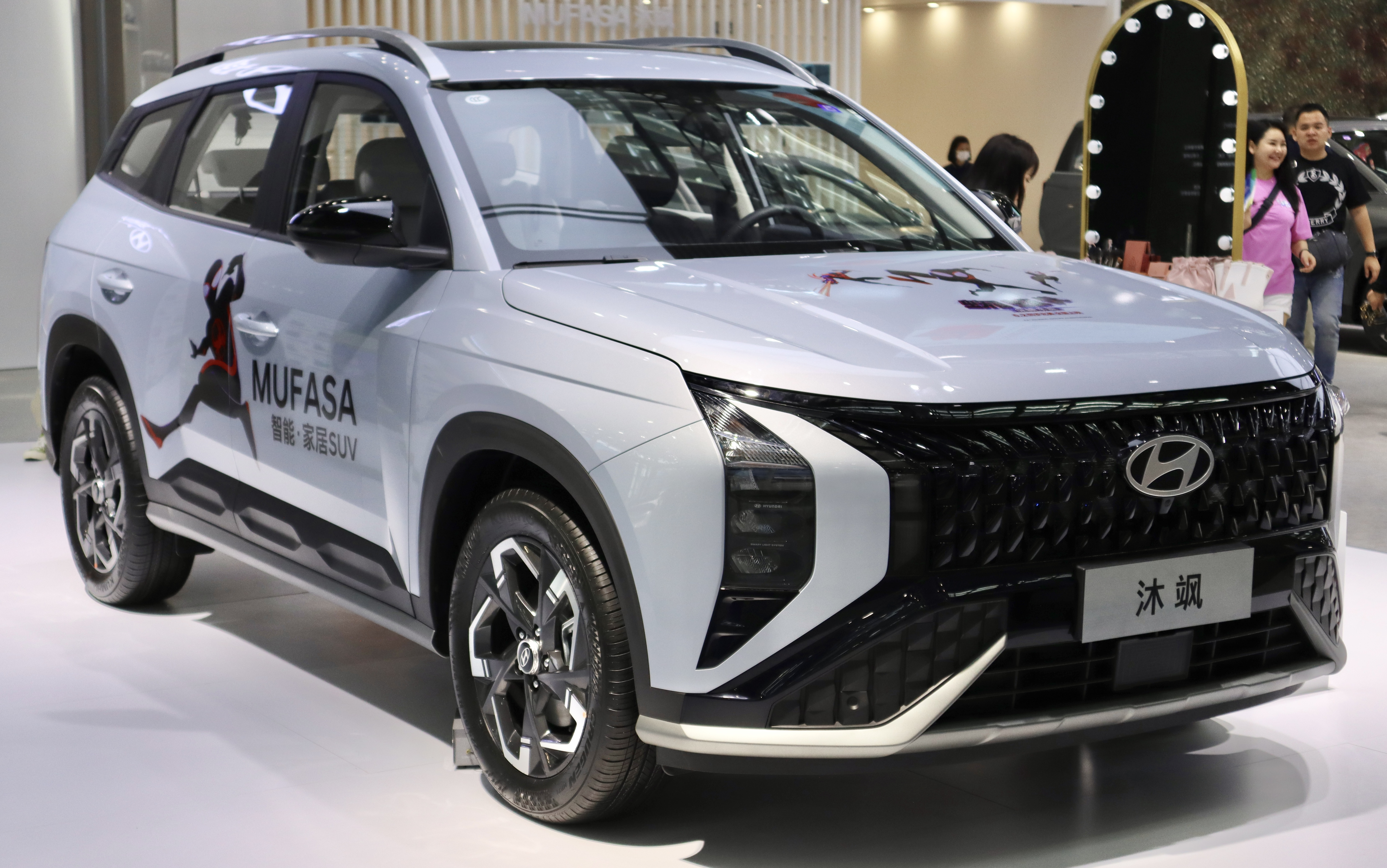
Hyundai Mufasa

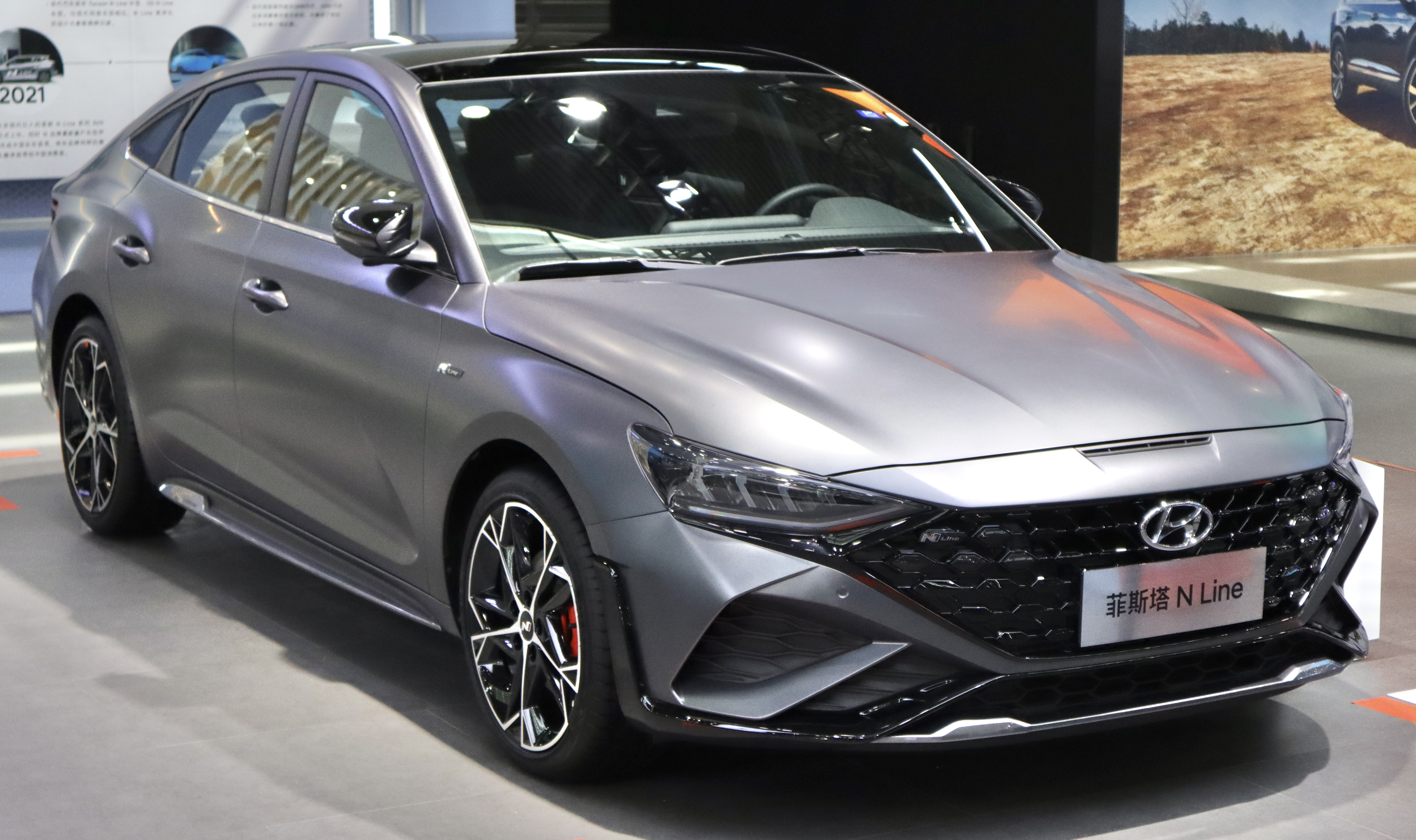
Hyundai Lafesta N-Line

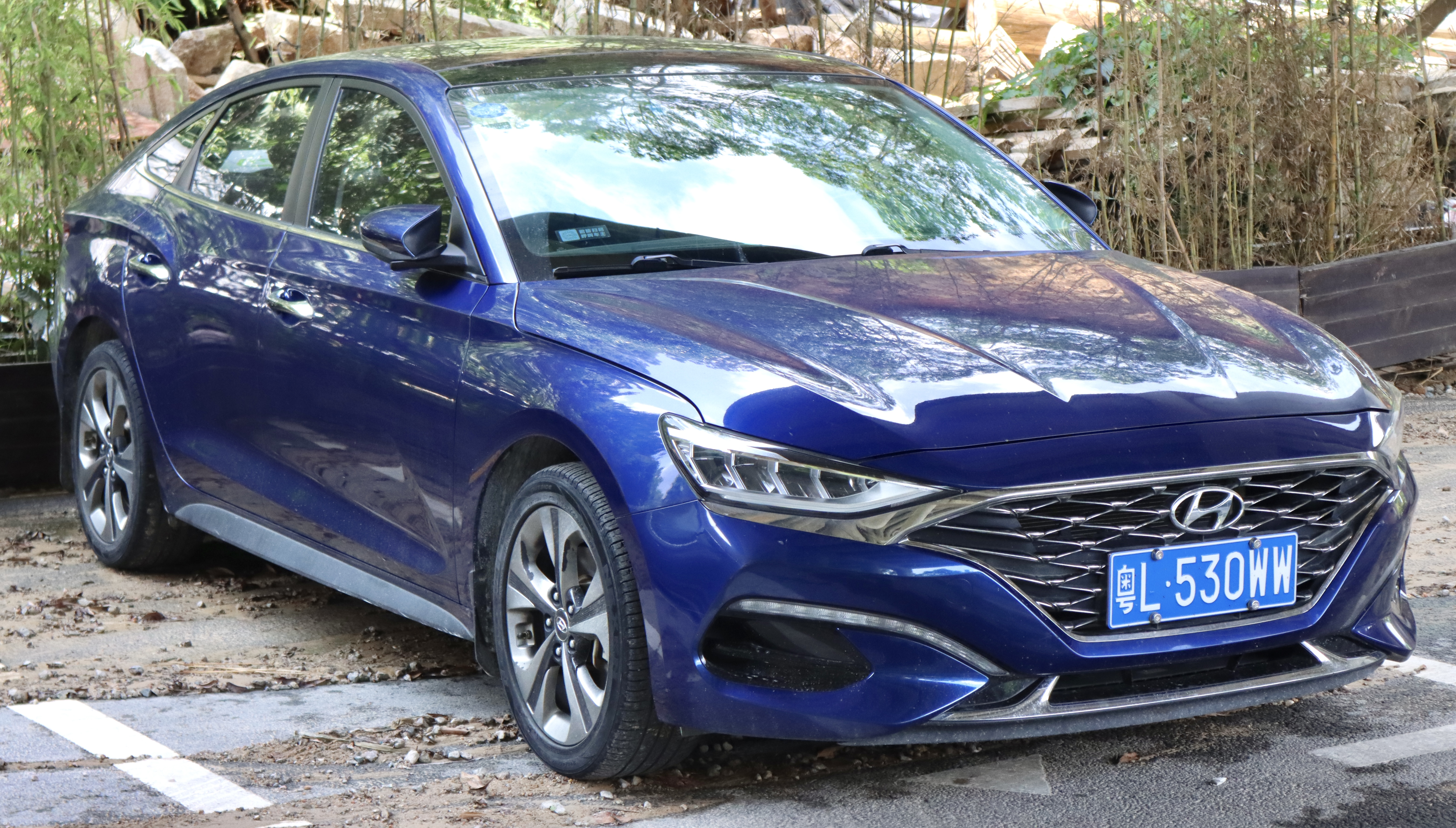
Hyundai Lafesta

=== Beijing Benz ===
The Beijing Benz is joint venture between BAIC Motor and German automaker Daimler AG.

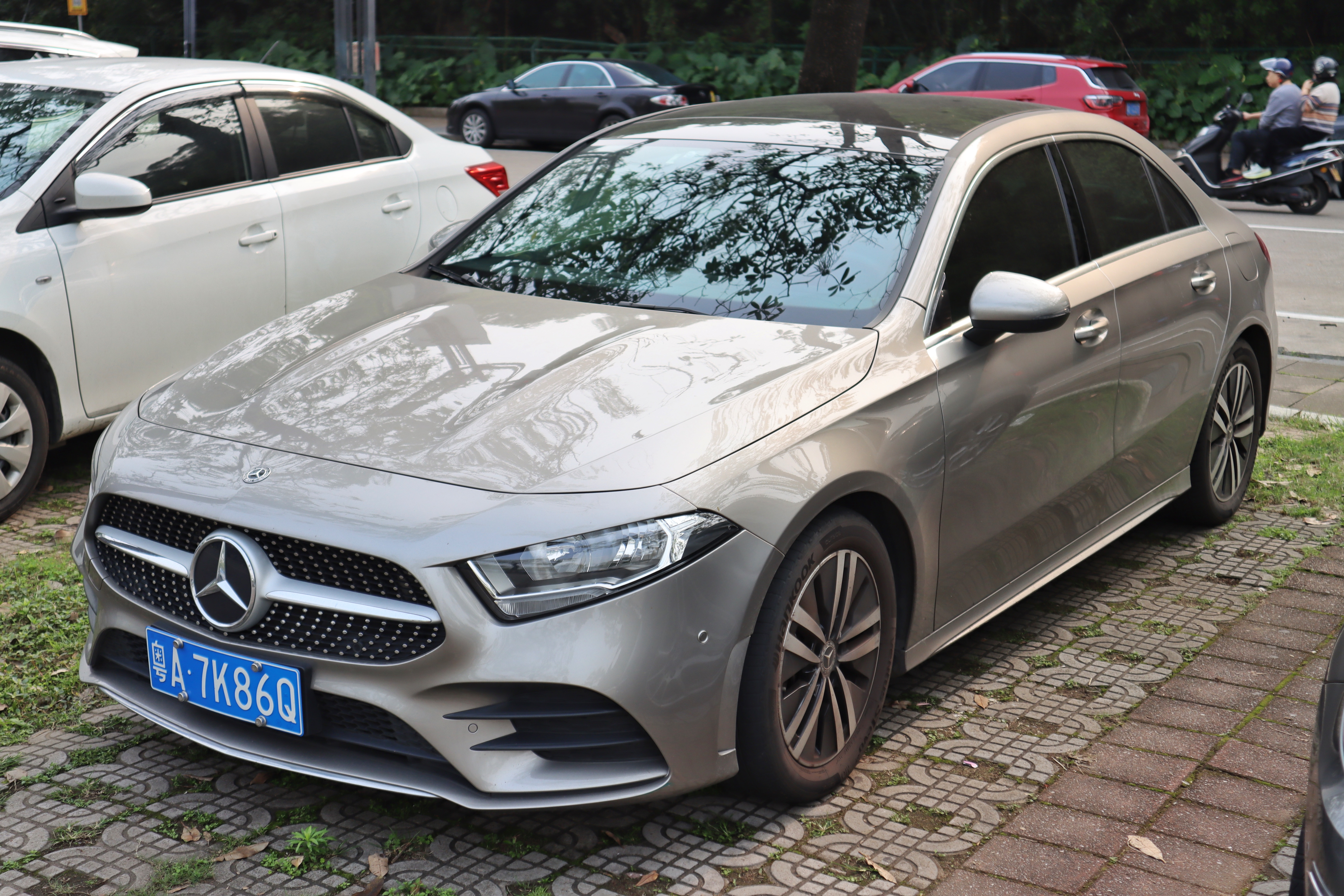
Beijing-Benz A180L

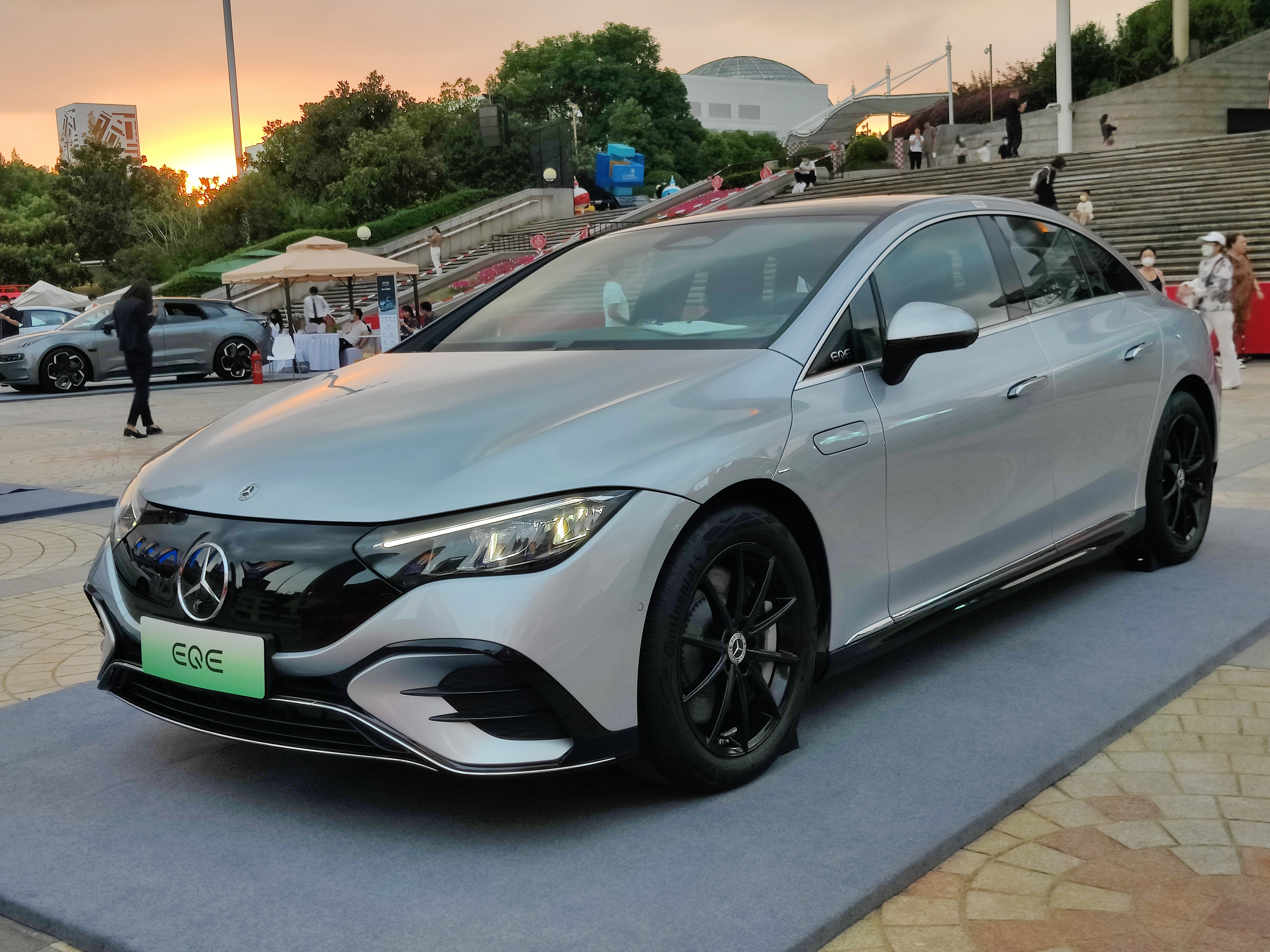
Mercedes-Benz EQE

=== Beijing Foton Daimler ===
Beijing Foton Daimler Automobile Co., Ltd. is a joint venture between Daimler and a BAIC subsidiary, Foton Motor, which makes commercial trucks.

=== Former joint ventures ===
==== Beijing Jeep ====
Beijing Jeep Corporation became China's first Sino-western automotive joint venture when it was established in 1984 with American Motors Corporation. Beijing Jeep subsequently became Beijing Benz-DaimlerChrysler Automotive Co Ltd and then Beijing Benz Automotive Co Ltd.

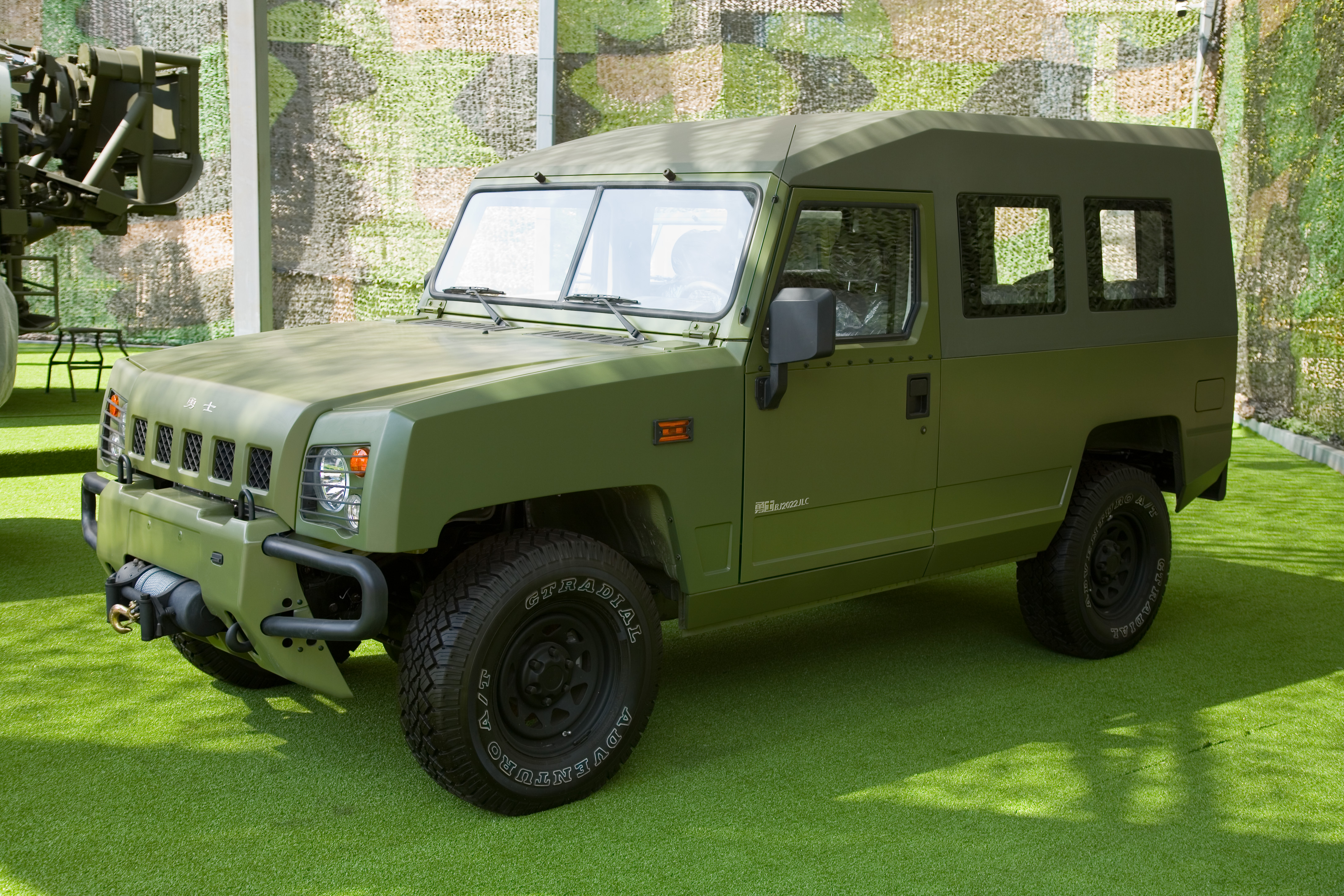
Beijing Jeep Warrior

=== Huansu ===
Huansu is a brand under Beiqi Yinxiang Automobile, a joint venture between Beijing Auto (Beiqi) and the Yinxiang Group from Chongqing.

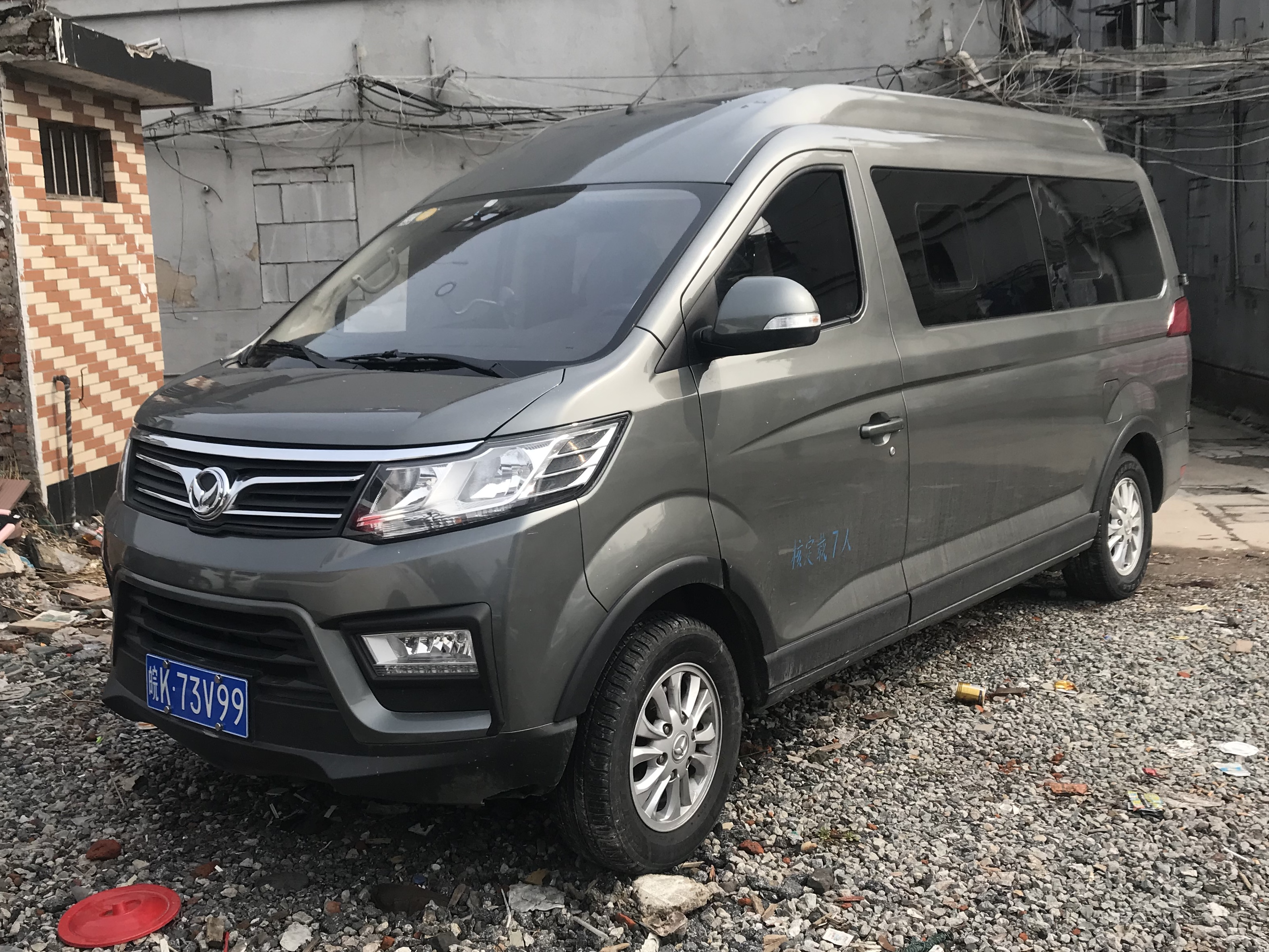
Huansu H6

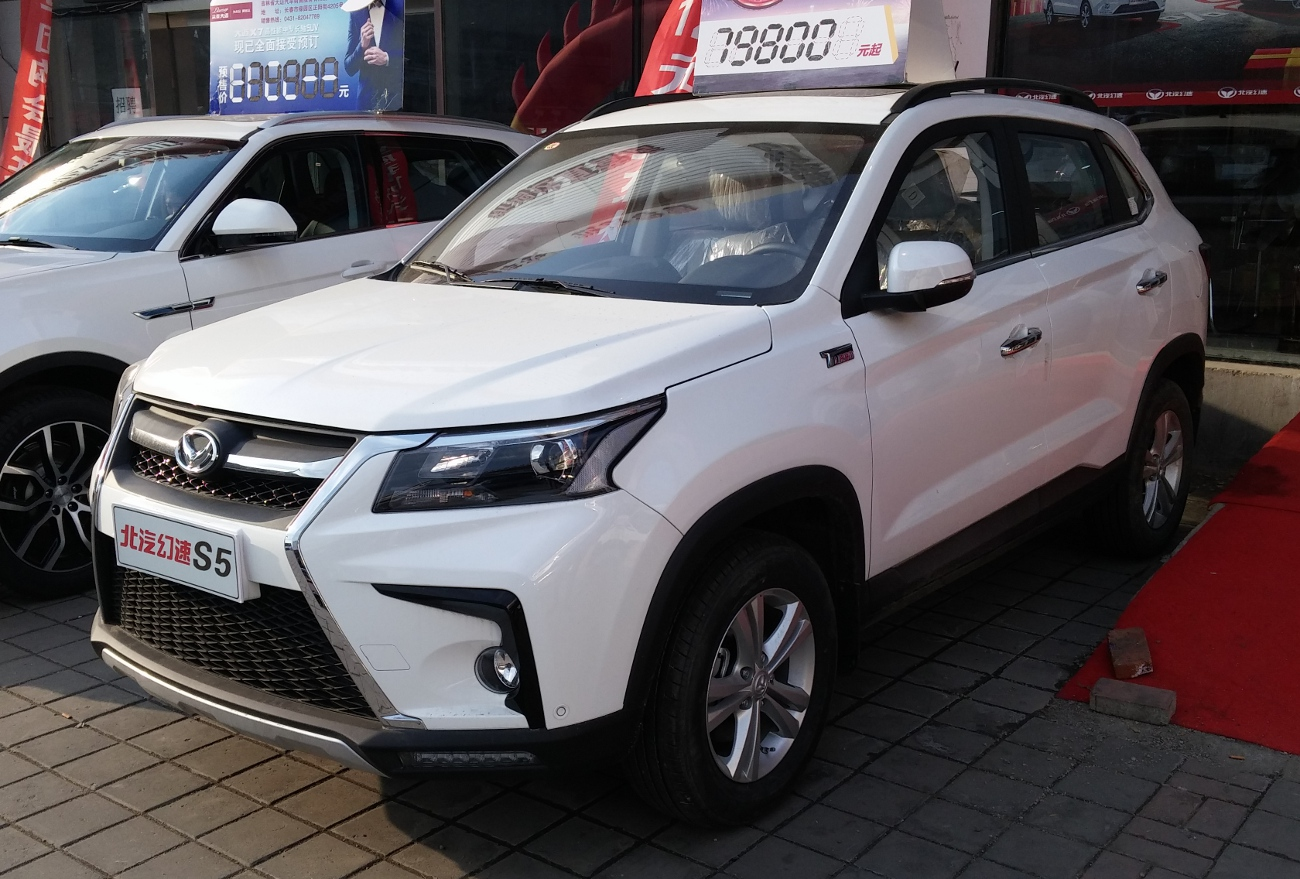
Huansu S5

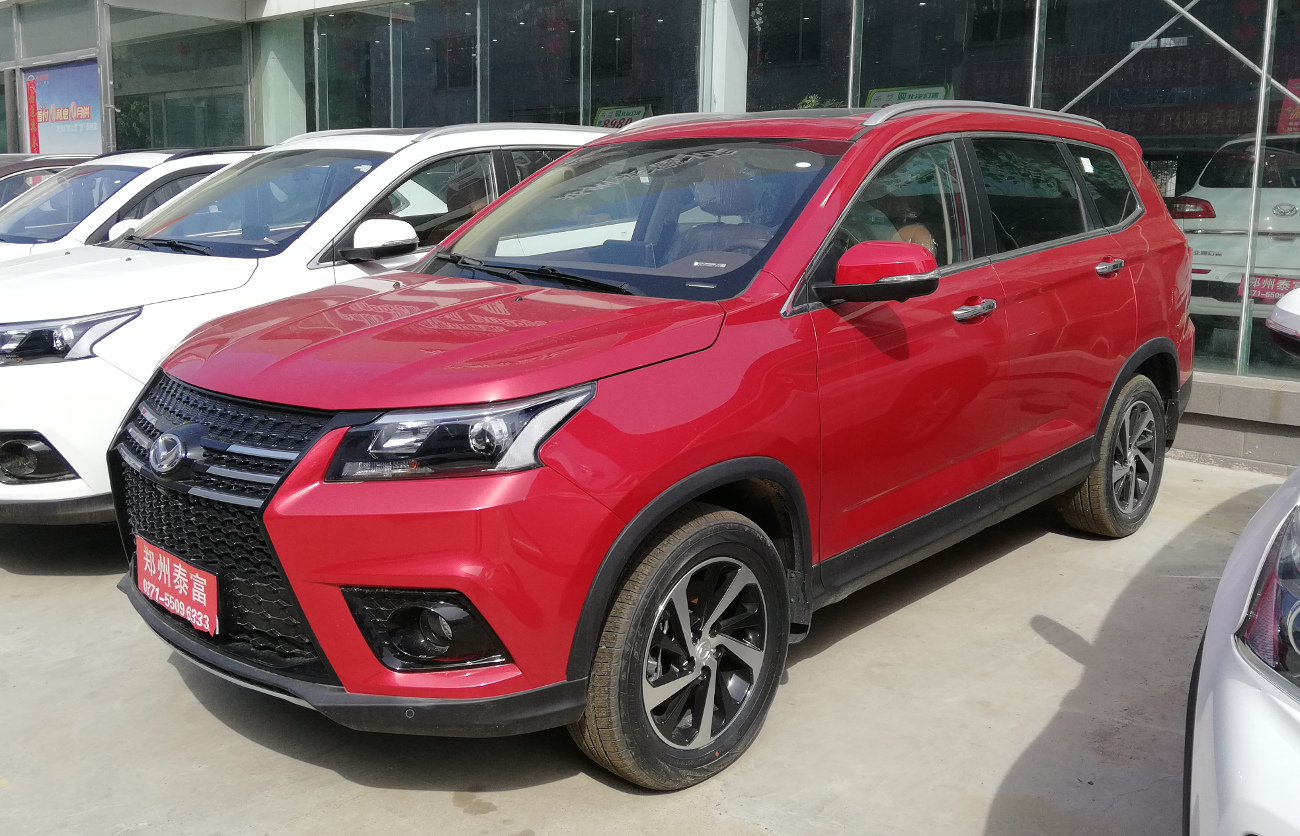
Huansu S7

=== Weiwang ===
Weiwang is a brand under Beiqi Yinxiang Automobile, a joint venture between Beijing Auto (Beiqi) and the Yinxiang Group from Chongqing.

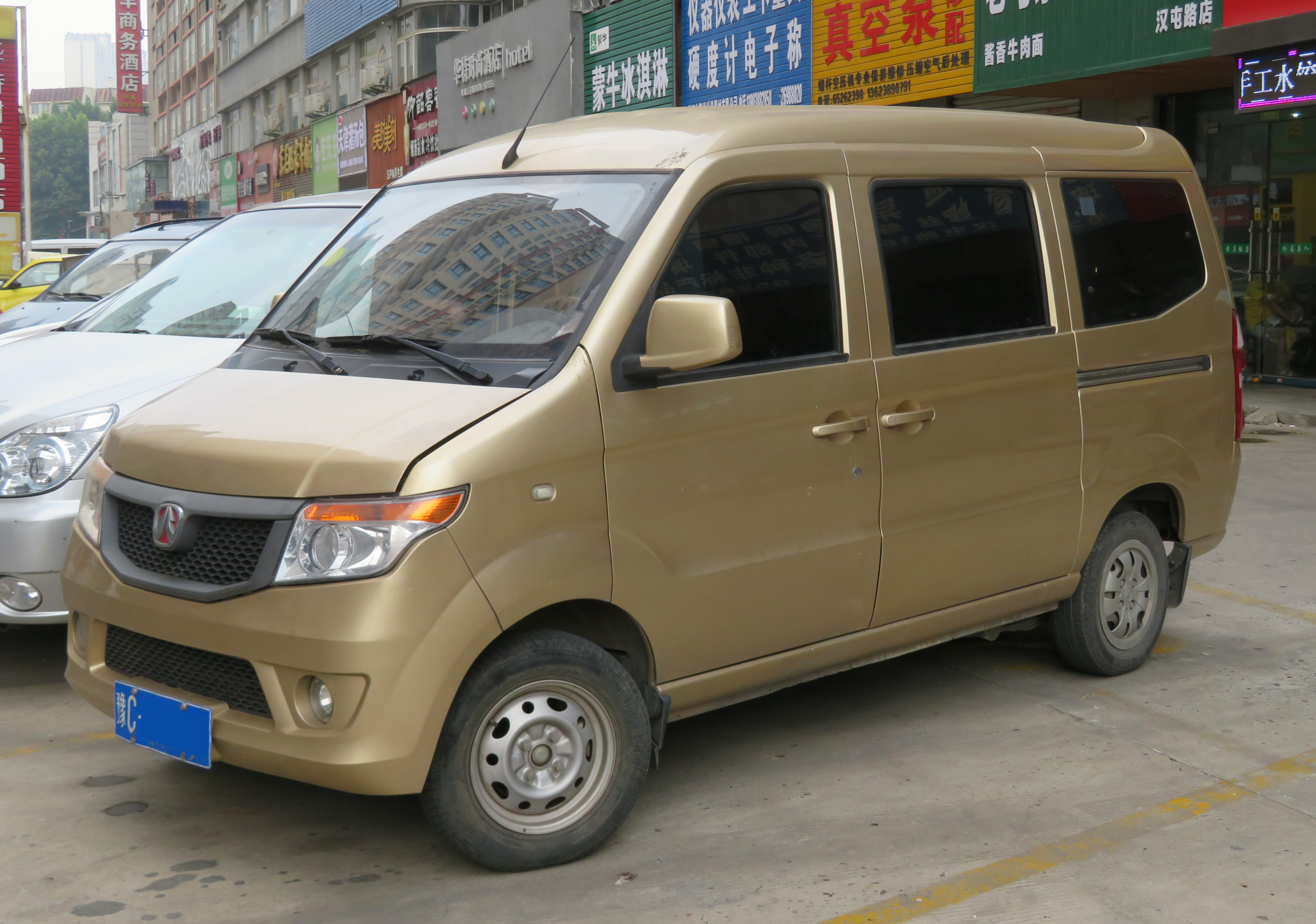
Weiwang 205

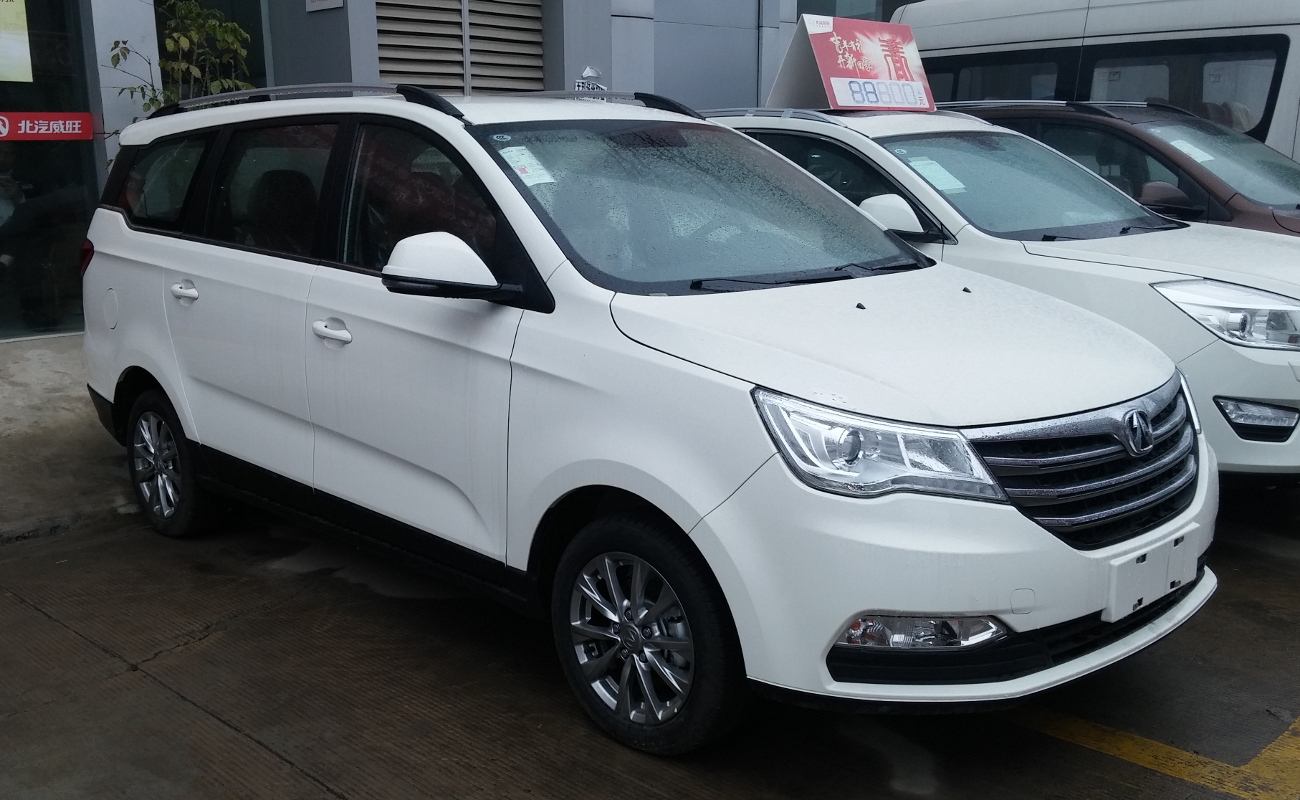
Weiwang M50F

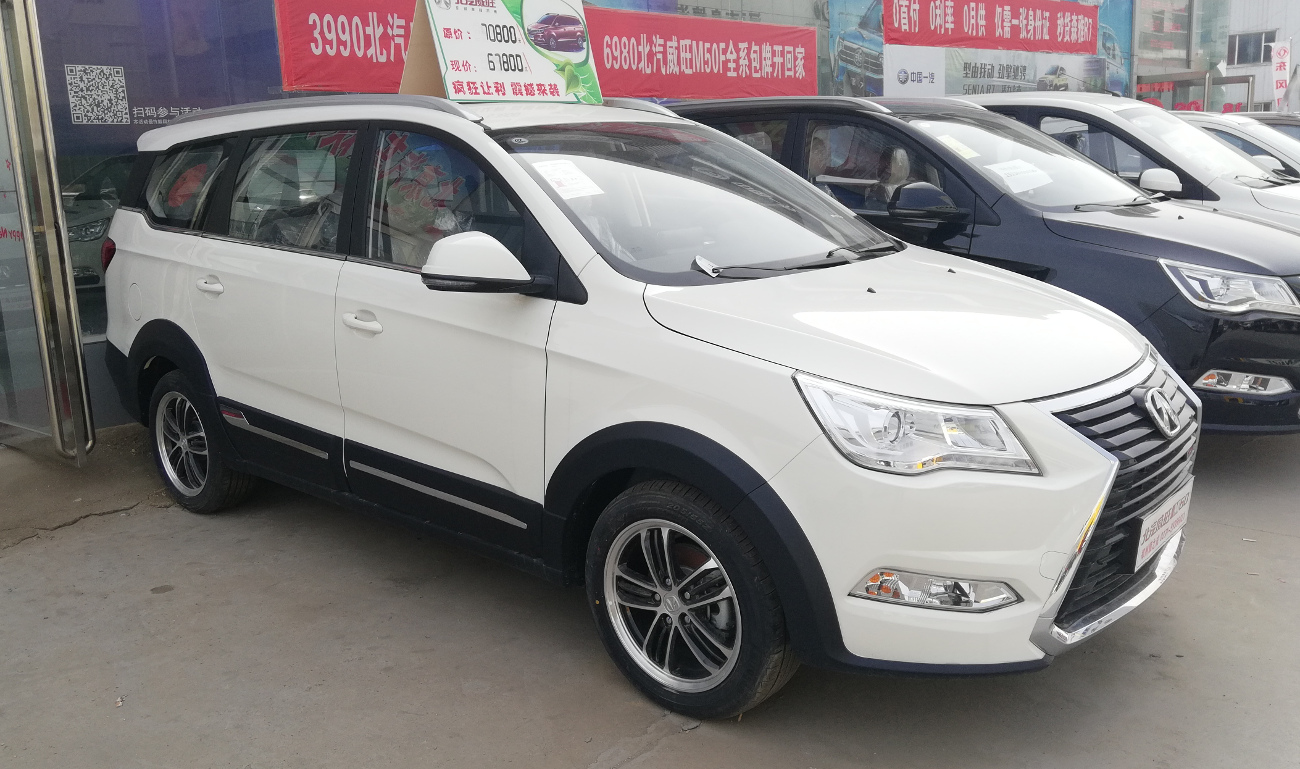
Weiwang M60

== International investments and holdings ==
Mercedes-Benz Group (9.98% stake)

- In July 2019, BAIC Group purchased a 5% stake in Daimler (since 2022 Mercedes-Benz Group), which is a reciprocal shareholder in BAIC's Hong Kong listed subsidiary.
- In December 2021, Mercedes-Benz Group revealed in its announcement that BAIC Group has increased its stake of Daimler to 9.98%. According to an agreement between both parties, BAIC has confirmed to not further raise its stake in Daimler.

Santana Motor

- In May 2025, BAIC Group, Zhengzhou Nissan (the subsidiary of Dongfeng Motor), and Anhui Coronet Tech formed a three-party consortium, deciding to invest 5 million euros to restart the Spanish manufacturer Santana Motor's factory in Linares. Starting from mid-2026, BAIC would sell off-road models the Beijing BJ40 and Beijing BJ30 in Europe under the Santana brand, assembled via SKD (semi-knockdown) at the Spanish factory.

== Subsidiaries ==
As of 31 December 2016

- BAIC Investment (97.95%)
  - Beijing Hyundai (50%)
- Beijing Beinei Engine Parts and Components (98.975% direct and indirectly)
  - Beijing Beinei Motor Spare Parts Sales (100%)
- Beijing Benz Automotive (51%)
- BAIC Motor Powertrain (100%)
- BAIC Hong Kong Investment (100%)
- Zhuzhou (BAIC) Motor Sales (100%)
- BAIC Motor Sales (100%)
- BAIC (Guangzhou) Motor (100%)
- BAIC MB-tech Development Center (51%)

== Equity investments ==
As of 31 December 2016

- Fujian Benz Automotive (35%)
- Beijing Mercedes-Benz Sales Service (49%)
- Mercedes-Benz Leasing (35%)
- Beijing Electric Vehicle (8.5%)
- Hyundai Top Selection U-Car (40%)
- Beijing Hyundai Auto Finance (33%)
- BAIC Group Finance (20%)

== Sales ==
BAIC group sales by brand
Year	Total	BAIC Motor	BAIC Off-road	BAIC Bluepark		Foton
Year	Total	Beijing	Beijing Off-road	Arcfox	Stelato	Foton
2010	682,895	-	-	-	-	682,895
2011	664,812	24,415	-	-	-	640,397
2012	683,991	77,561	-	-	-	606,430
2013	866,994	202,280	-	-	-	664,714
2014	864,783	309,648	-	-	-	555,135
2015	827,170	337,102	-	-	-	490,070
2016	988,109	457,082	-	-	-	531,109
2017	837,129	235,841	-	472	-	600,816
2018	701,754	156,159	-	588	-	545,007
2019	743,614	166,992	36,018	599	-	540,005
2020	790,241	81,792	27,562	721	-	680,166
2021	760,476	72,434	32,015	4,993	-	650,018
2022	570,681	71,897	25,689	11,895	-	460,126
2023	821,033	160,000		30,016	-	631,017
2024	872,362	173,000		81,017	4,232	614,113
2025	1,070,000	10,000	200,000	163,000	37,593	659,455

== Sponsorship ==
BAIC Group becomes the main sponsor of Dewa United, a sports club that has three divisions, namely football, basketball, and eSports. This collaboration was announced at the 2024 Gaikindo Indonesia International Auto Show (GIIAS). BAIC sees Dewa United as a club with proud achievements and wants to contribute to Indonesia. This collaboration includes financial support and provision of BAIC operational vehicles for Dewa United. BAIC will also place their logo on the jerseys of all teams under the auspices of Dewa United, including football, basketball, and eSports.

== See also ==
- Automobile manufacturers and brands of China
- List of automobile manufacturers of China
- Automotive industry in China
