= CC =

CC or cc most often refers to:

- Carbon copy, or courtesy copy, in the context of letter or email-writing
- Cubic centimetre (cc), a unit of volume
- 200 (number) in Roman numerals

CC, cc, or C-C may also refer to:

== Arts and media ==
=== Fictional characters ===
- C.C. (Code Geass), in the Code Geass anime series, pronounced "C-two"
- C.C. Babcock, in the American sitcom The Nanny
- Comedy Chimp, in Sonic Boom, called "CC" by Doctor Eggman

=== Gaming ===
- Command & Conquer (C&C), a series of real-time strategy games and the first game in the series
- Crowd control (video gaming), the ability to limit the number of mobs actively fighting during an encounter

=== Music ===
- Cannibal Corpse, an American death metal band
- "Cc", a song by Ecco2k from his album E

=== Other uses in arts and media ===
- Cardistry-Con, a conference on cardistry
- Closed captioning, a process of displaying text on a visual display, such as a TV screen
- Content Creator
- Adobe Creative Cloud, a series of subscription-based software developed and sold by Adobe Inc.
- Creative Commons license, a copyright license
- CC Media Holdings, the former name of iHeartMedia
- Comedy Central, an American television network (URL is cc.com)
- Creative Camera, defunct British photography magazine

== Education ==
- Detroit Catholic Central High School, a private all-male high school in Novi, Michigan, US
- Colorado College, a liberal arts college in Colorado Springs, Colorado, US
- College Confidential (company), a college admissions counseling company
- Coburger Convent, a German and Austrian student organization

== Government and politics ==
- Caribbean Community, an international organization with fifteen members
- Canarian Coalition, a Spanish political party based in the Canary Islands
- Carson City Mint, a former branch of the US mint, with mint mark CC
- Companion of the Order of Canada, a Canadian honour signified with post-nominal letters CC
- Consular corps, the staff of a consulate
- Creative Commons, a non-profit organization in the field of copyright licensing

== People ==
- Coco Chanel, whose monogram was an interlocking CC
- CC Sabathia, a retired American baseball pitcher

== Places ==
- Carson City, Nevada, US, commonly abbreviated CC
- Chile (aircraft registration prefix CC)
- Cocos (Keeling) Islands (ISO 3166 code), an Australian territory
- Component city, a legal class of cities in the Philippines

== Science, technology, and mathematics ==
=== Computing and mathematics ===
- .cc, the Internet country code top-level domain for Cocos (Keeling) Islands, an Australian territory
- C compiler, C language compiler with command cc
- Common Criteria, an international standard (ISO 15408) for computer security
- International Conference on Compiler Construction, an academic conference
- Cyclomatic complexity, a source-code metric
- CC (complexity), a complexity class in computational complexity theory
- Complex conjugate, an operation on complex numbers, commonly abbreviated as c. c.
- Cc (space group), three-dimensional space group number 9 in mathematics
- Adobe Creative Cloud, a series of subscription-based software developed and sold by Adobe Inc.

=== Natural sciences ===
- CC (cat), the first genetically cloned pet
- Carbonaceous chondrite, a type of meteorite
- Chief complaint, a medical patient's primary reported symptom
- Clausius–Clapeyron relation, an equation used in climatology
- Complex conductivity (measurement method), in geophysics
- Coupled cluster, a numerical technique in computational chemistry

=== Other uses in technology ===
- Capacity credit, a fraction of the installed capacity of a power plant which can be relied upon during the system stress
- Chemours, a chemical company (former NYSE stock symbol CC)
- Circuit City (former NYSE stock symbol CC), a former American electronics retailer
- Classification of Types of Construction, for buildings
- Climate control, control systems for heating, ventilation, and air conditioning
- Combustion chamber, in internal combustion engines
- C-C, a wheel configuration for diesel and electric locomotive; see AAR wheel arrangement

== Sports ==
- Conference Carolinas, an NCAA Division II athletic conference
- "Cross country" athletics abbreviation for running sports
- Champion Carnival, a professional wrestling tournament
- CC Sabathia, a retired American baseball pitcher

== Transportation ==
=== Air ===
- Chile (aircraft registration prefix CC)
- Air Atlanta Icelandic (IATA airline designator), an Icelandic airline
- MacAir Airlines (former IATA airline designator), a defunct Australian airline

=== Rail ===
- Chicago Central and Pacific Railroad (reporting mark CC)
- Cicayur railway station (code: CC) in Indonesia
- A former New York City Subway service, now a predecessor of the:
  - C (New York City Subway service)
  - Rockaway Park Shuttle

=== Road ===
- Carretera Central (Cuba)
- Changan Raeton CC, a Chinese mid-size sedan
- Senova CC, a Chinese mid-size sports sedan
- Volkswagen CC, a German mid-size sedan
  - Volkswagen Arteon, sold in China as Volkswagen CC

=== Sea ===
- A US Navy hull classification symbol, first for Battlecruiser (CC), then for Command cruiser (CC)

== Other uses ==
- CC's, a tortilla chip brand in Australia
- CC cream, a cosmetic marketing term
- Canadian Club, a brand of whisky
- Chanel, a fashion house, whose logo is an interlocking CC
- Colon classification, a library classification scheme
- Column numbers, as a prefix "cc", as in-source-locator in old citations
- Companions of the Cross, a community of Roman Catholic priests
- Credit card

== See also ==
- C++, a programming language
- CCC (disambiguation)
- Cici (disambiguation)
- Seesee, a species of bird in the pheasant family
- Sissi (disambiguation)
- CeCe (disambiguation)
- Corpus Christi (disambiguation)
