= CeCe =

Cece or CeCe may refer to:

== People ==
- Cece Bell (born 1970), American author and illustrator
- Cece Carlucci (1917–2008), American baseball umpire
- Cece Kizer (born 1997), American football player
- CeCe McDonald (born 1989), American transgender LGBTQ activist
- CeCe Moore (born 1969), American genetic genealogist
- CeCe Peniston (born 1969), American gospel and dance music singer
- Cécé Pepe (born 1996), French football player
- Cece Peters (born 1962), Australian actor
- CeCe Rogers, American singer, songwriter and record producer
- Cece Sagini, Kenyan singer-songwriter
- CeCé Telfer, American transgender athlete
- CeCe Winans (born 1964), American gospel music singer

== Characters ==
- CeCe Drake, a character from the TV show Pretty Little Liars
- Cece King, a character from New Zealand soap opera Shortland Street
- Cece (New Girl), a character from the TV sitcom New Girl
- Cecelia "CeCe" Halpert, a character from The Office
- Constance "Cece" Cooper-McAllister, the baby of Georgie Cooper and Mandy McAllister from the TV Shows Young Sheldon and Georgie & Mandy’s First Marriage
- CeCe Matney, a character from the Netflix TV show Sweet Magnolias
- CeCe Proud, from The Proud Family
- CeCe Jones, one of the lead characters from the Disney Channel series Shake It Up

== Other ==
- Cece, Hungary, a village in Fejér county, Hungary
- Čeče, settlement in Slovenia
- CeCe (album), a 2011 album by CeCe Peniston
- Cece McStuffins, the adopted doll of Doc McStuffins
- Common Extensible Cryogenic Engine, a liquid-fuel rocket engine; see RL10 § Common Extensible Cryogenic Engine

== See also ==
- CC (disambiguation)
- Cecelia (disambiguation)
- Cici (disambiguation)
