= Cecilia (disambiguation) =

Cecilia or Cecelia is a feminine given name.

Cecilia may also refer to:

== Films ==
- Cecilia (1954 film), a Norwegian film
- Cecilia (1982 film), a Cuban film

== Geography ==
- Cecilia, Table Mountain, a section of the Table Mountain National Park, Cape Town, South Africa
- Cecilia Island, the South Shetland Islands, Antarctica
- Cecilia, Kentucky, an unincorporated community in the United States
- Cecilia, Louisiana, a small census-designated place in the United States

== Music ==
=== Performers ===
- Cecilia (band), an American pop-rock band based in New York
- Cecilia (Norwegian singer), (born 1967)
- Cecilia (Spanish singer), Spanish singer-songwriter Evangelina Sobredo Galanes (1948–1976)
- Cecilia Pantoja (1943–2023), Chilean singer known by her first name

=== Operas ===
- Cecilia (Refice opera), a 1934 opera by Licinio Refice
- Cecilia a 2000 opera by Charles Chaynes

=== Songs ===
- '"Cäcilie" (Strauss), an 1894 song by Richard Strauss
- "Cecilia" (Ace of Base song), a 1999 song
- "Cecilia" (Dreyer and Ruby song), a 1926 song written by Dave Dreyer with lyrics by Harry Ruby
- "Cecilia" (Simon & Garfunkel song), a 1970 song
- "Oh Cecilia" (Breaking My Heart), a 2014 song
- "Cecilia and the Satellite", a 2014 song
- "Cecilia", a Brett Kissel song from the album We Were That Song, 2017
- "Cecilia", a song by Juanes from Vida Cotidiana, 2023

=== Choral societies ===
- Boston Cecilia, a choral society based in Boston, Massachusetts

== Novels ==
- Cecilia (Burney novel), a 1782 work by Frances Burney
- Cecilia (McClure novel), a 1993 novel by Julie McClure

== Other uses ==
- Caecilian, a group (order) of amphibians
- Tropical Cyclone Cecilia (1993)
