= Senova =

Auto mark of BAIC Motor

- Product type: Automobile marque
- Current owner: BAIC Motor
- Country: China
- Introduced: March 2012
- Discontinued: 2020
- Markets: China
- Website: Senova (in Chinese)

Chinese name
- Simplified Chinese: 绅宝
- Traditional Chinese: 紳寶
Transcriptions
Standard Mandarin
- Hanyu Pinyin: Shēn Bǎo
- Wade–Giles: Shen^{1} Pao^{3}

Senova is a defunct automobile marque owned by the Chinese automaker BAIC Motor, itself a subsidiary of BAIC Group. It was launched in March 2012.

== History ==
At the end of 2009, BAIC Group acquired the intellectual property rights to the Swedish car maker Saab's 9-3 and 9-5 models and related powertrain technologies in order to support the development of its own-brand vehicles.

The first Senova production model, the Senova D20, a subcompact five-door hatchback, went on sale in China in March 2012.

The production version of the Senova D70 made its debut at the 2012 Guangzhou Auto Show.

In July 2019, Beijing Zhida X3 started pre-sale, and the word "Senova" was no longer used, but the letter "BEIJING" was used instead, indicating that the Senbao brand will soon withdraw from the market. On May 15, 2020, BAIC Group announced the official launch of the "BEIJING" brand to replace the Senova brand.

== Products ==
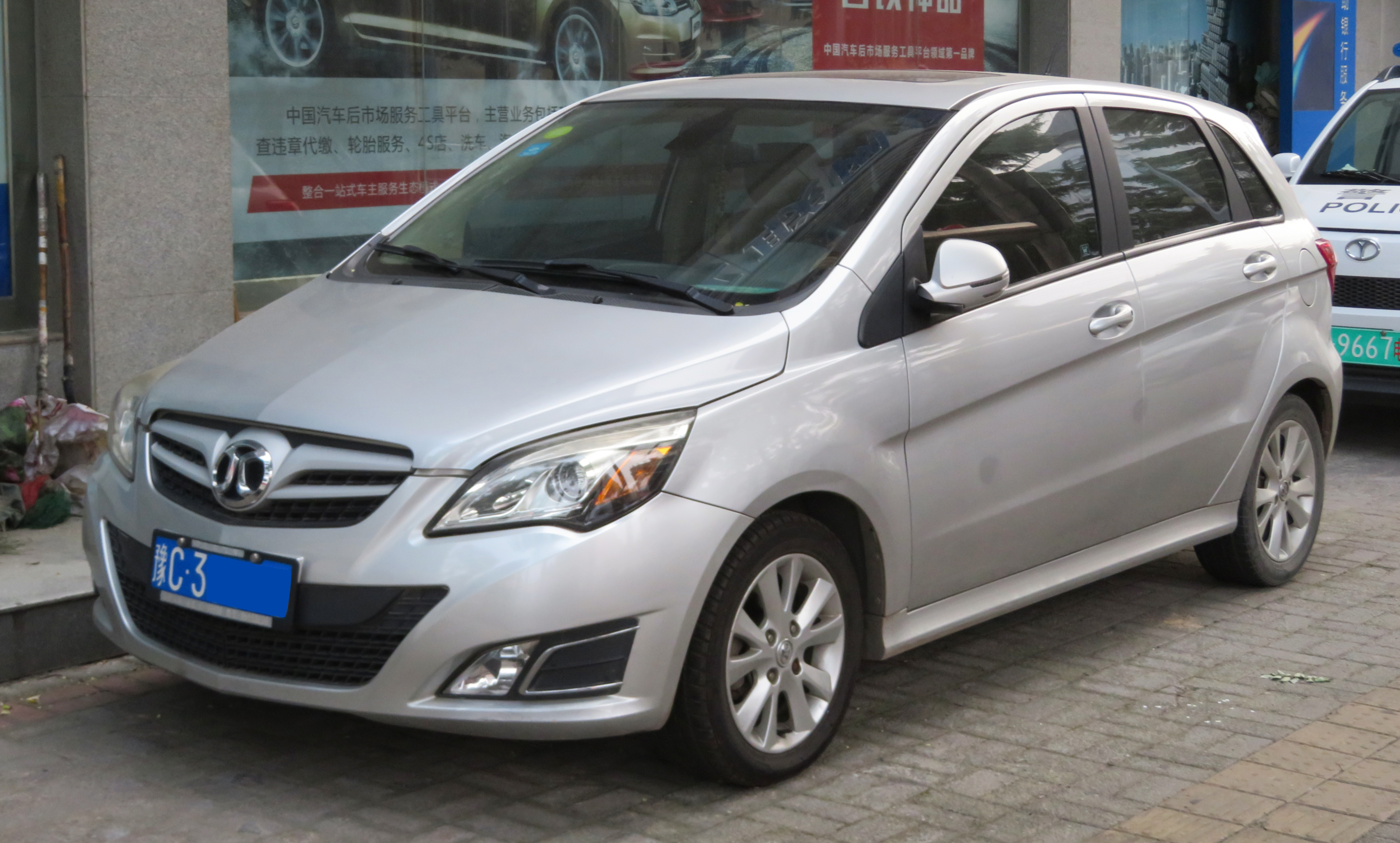
Senova D20 (formally BAIC Motor E-Series) hatch

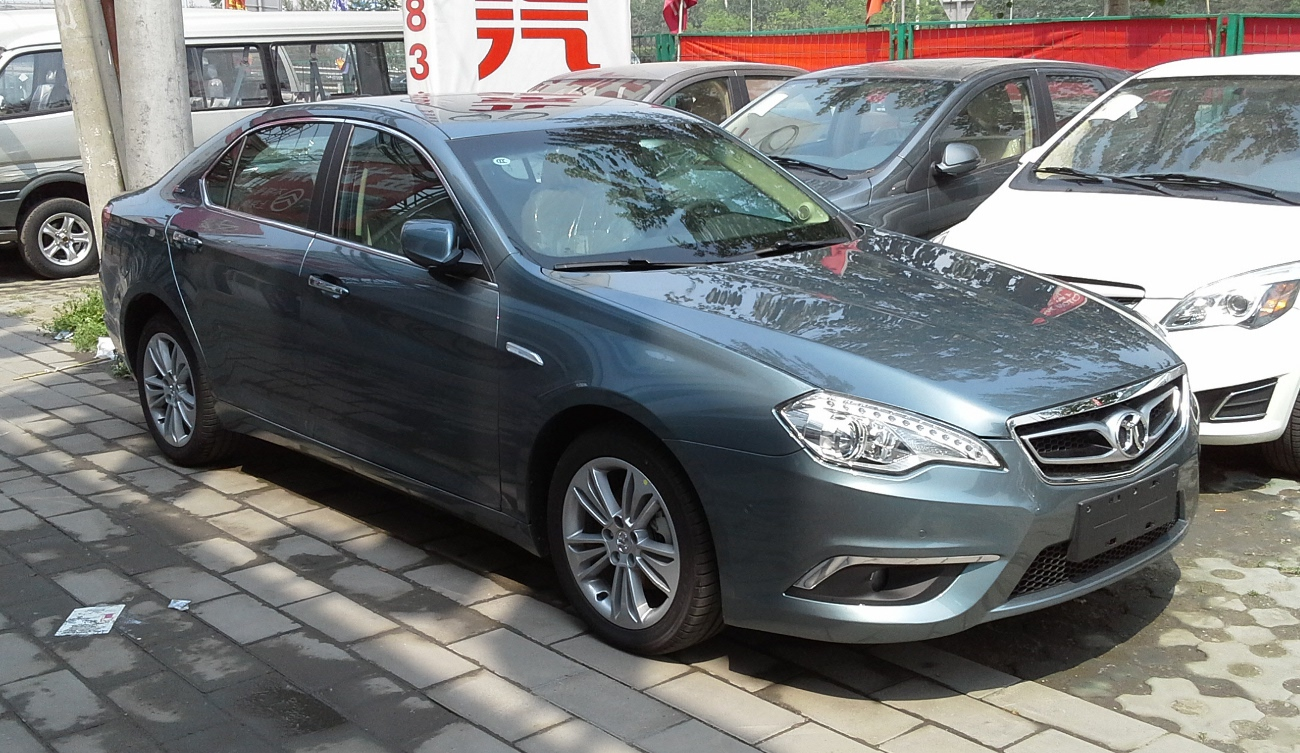
Senova D70

The current Senova range comprises the following models:

- Senova D20, a subcompact five-door hatchback and four-door sedan
- Senova D50
- Senova D60 (Discontinued in 2017)
- Senova CC (Discontinued in 2017)
- Senova D70 (formally Beijing Auto C70G)
- Senova D80 (Discontinued in 2017)
- Senova X25
- Senova X35
- Senova X55
- Senova X65 (Discontinued in 2017)
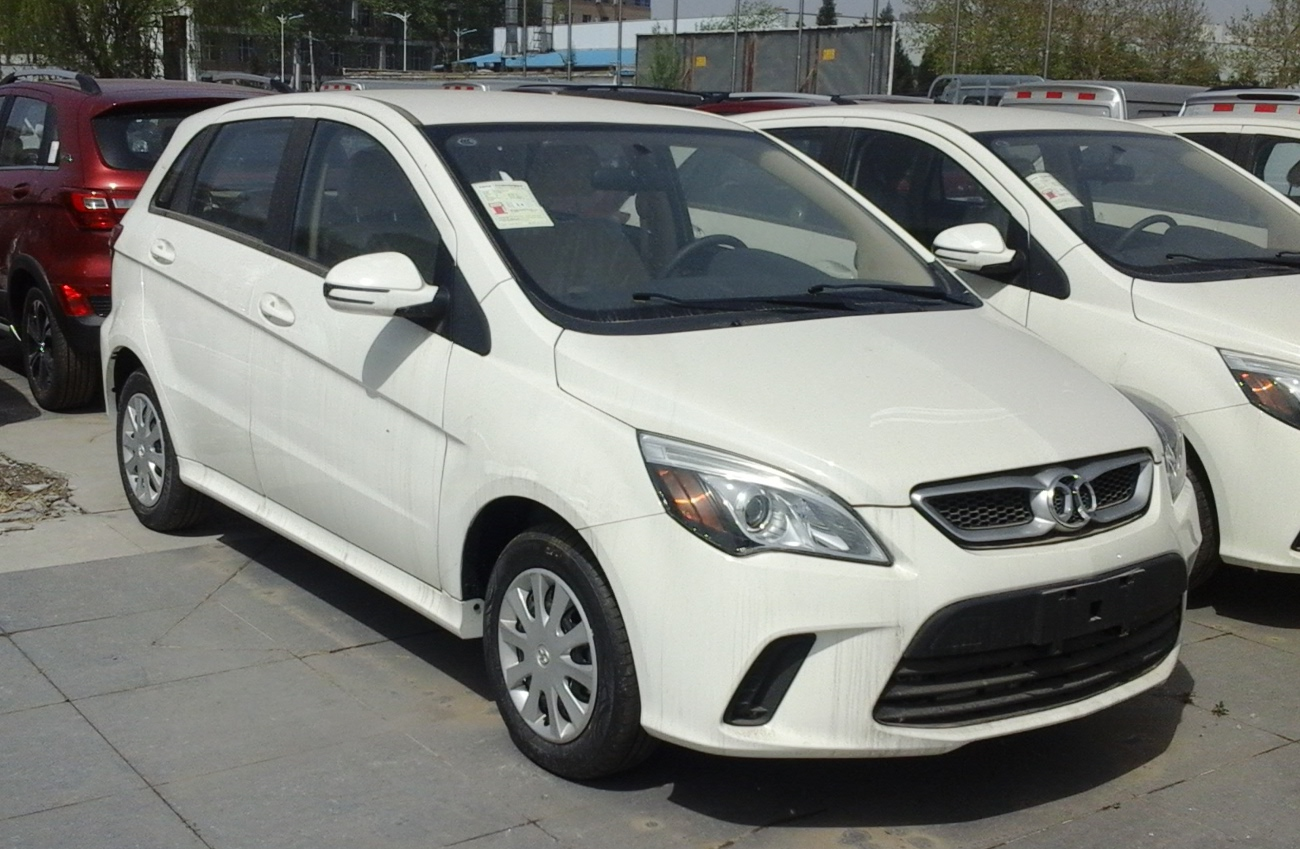
Senova D20 Hatchback

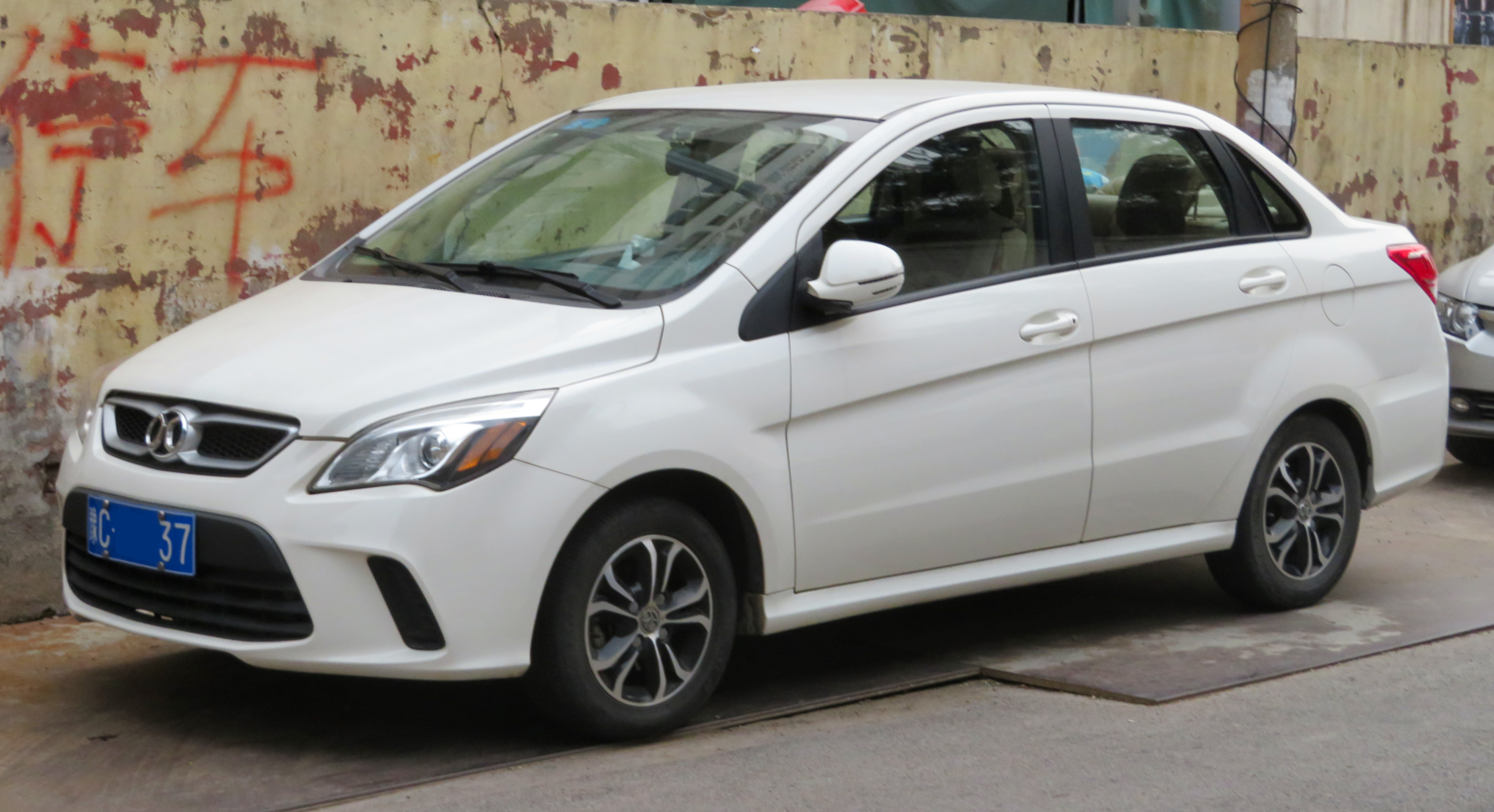
Senova D20 Sedan

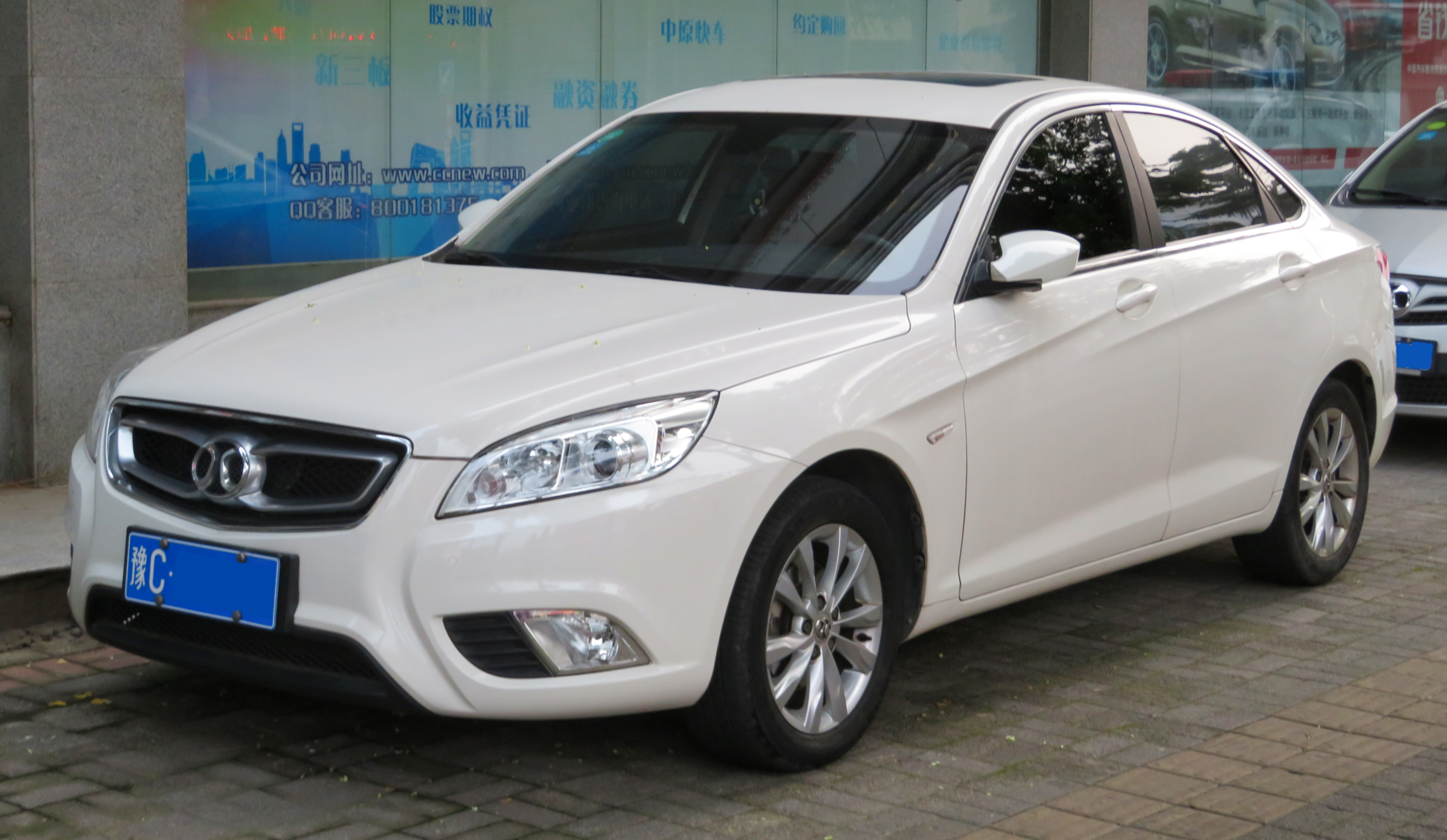
Senova D50

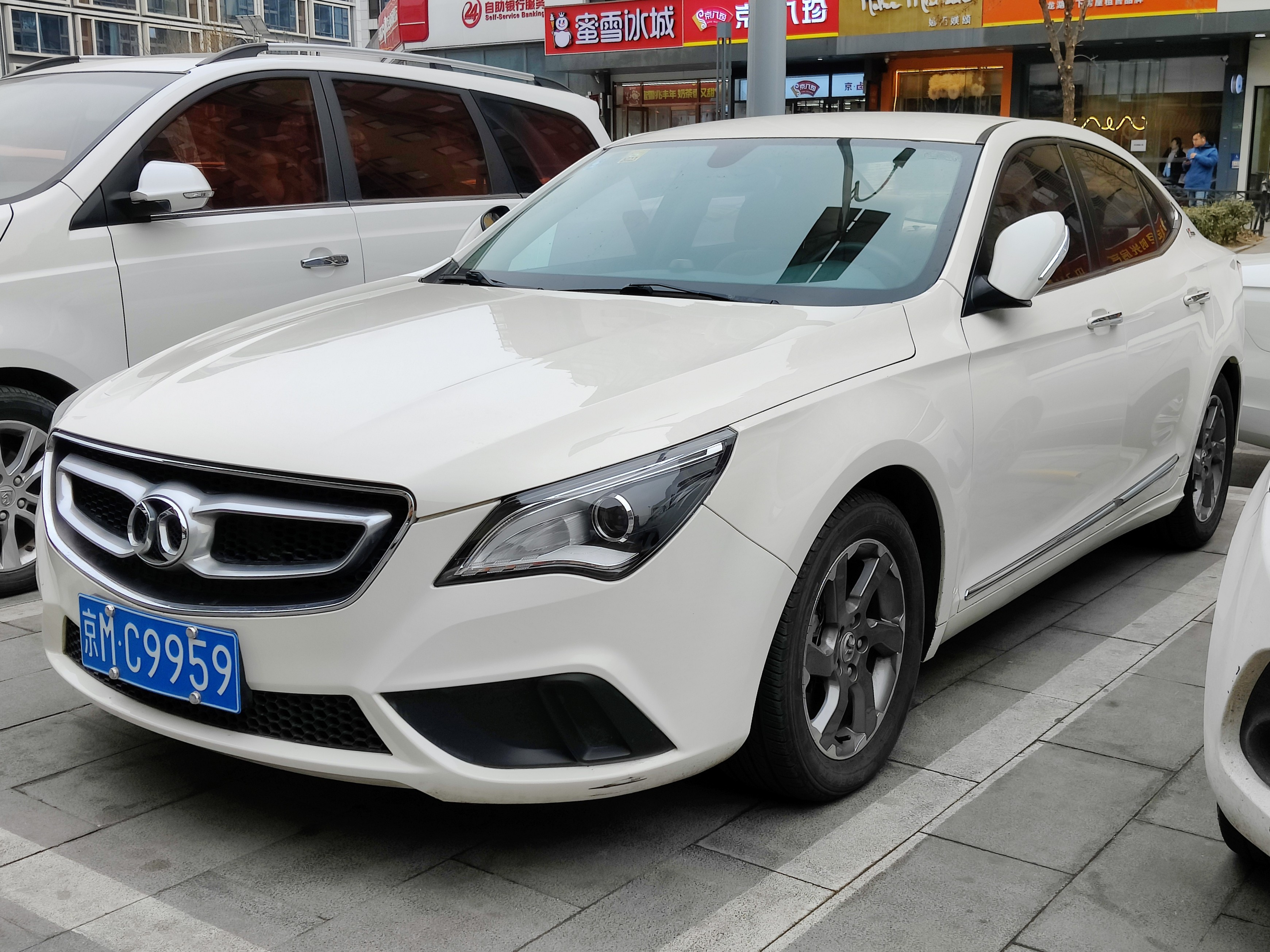
Senova D60

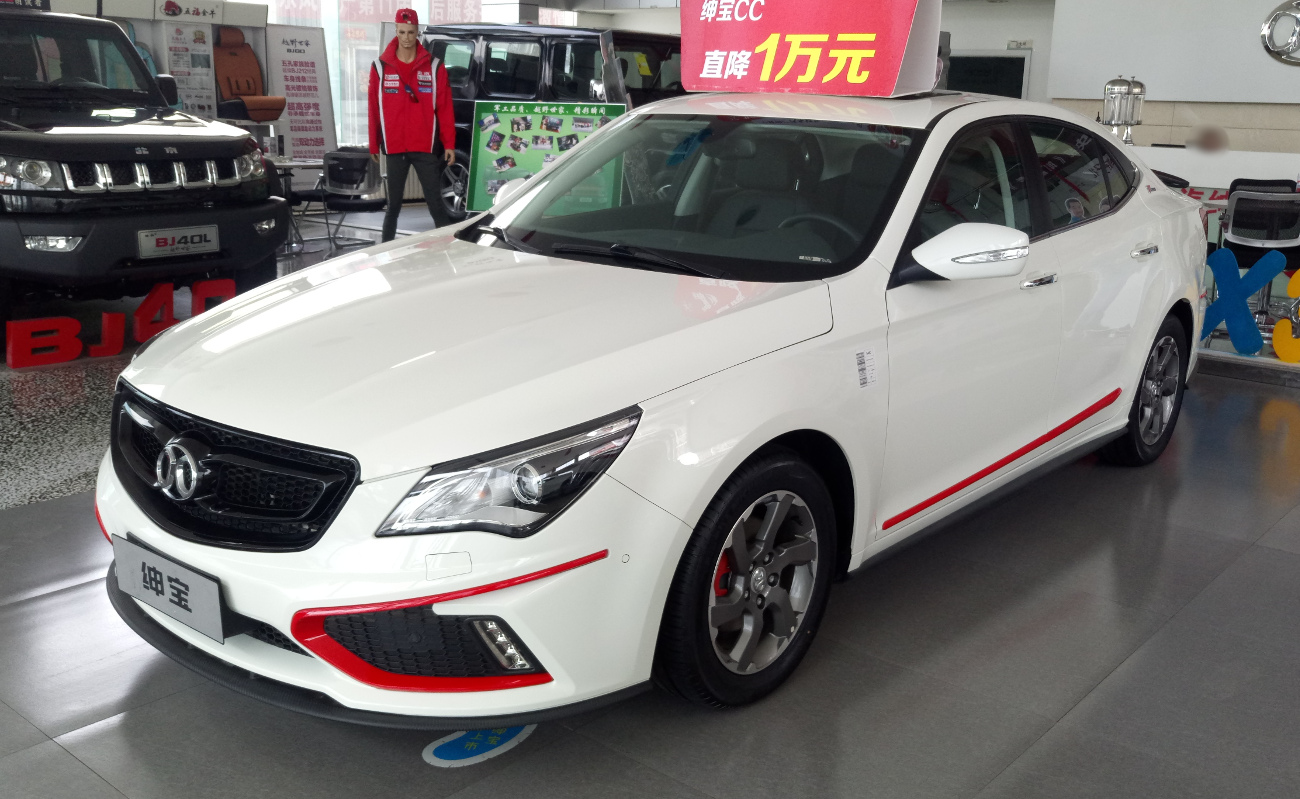
Senova CC

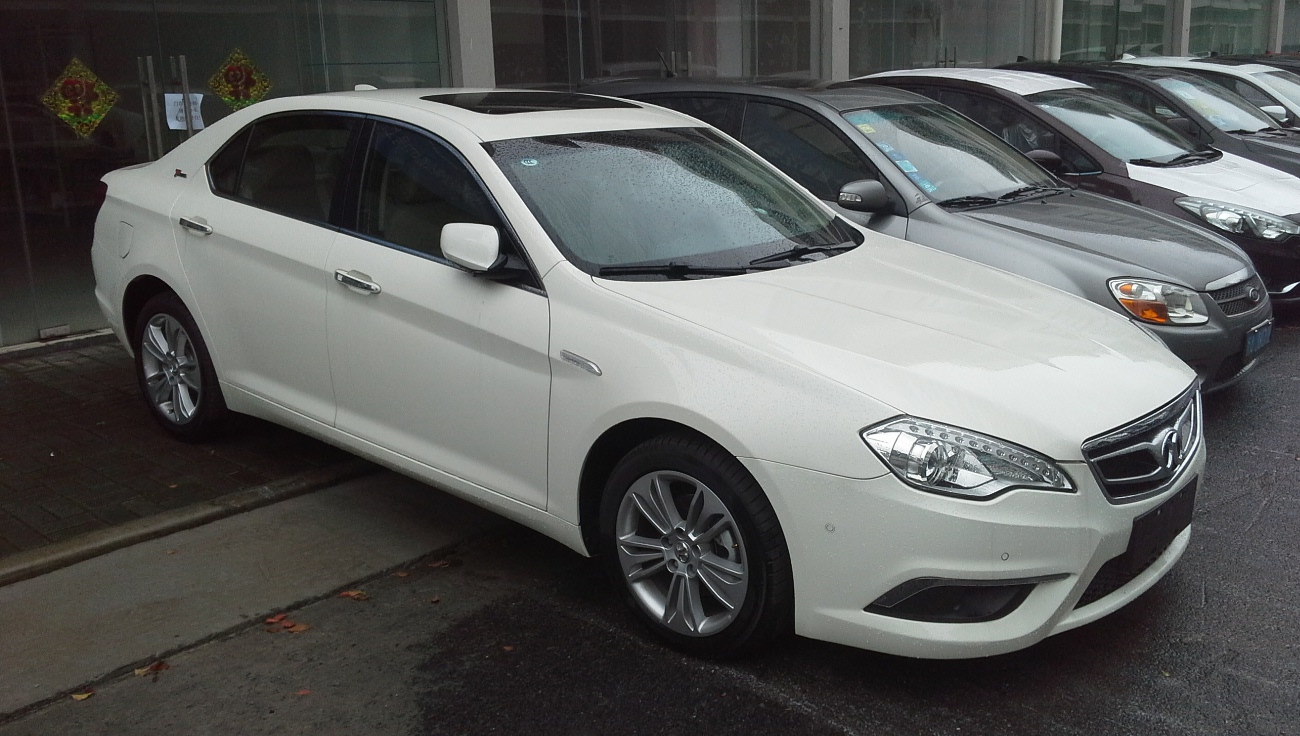
Senova D70

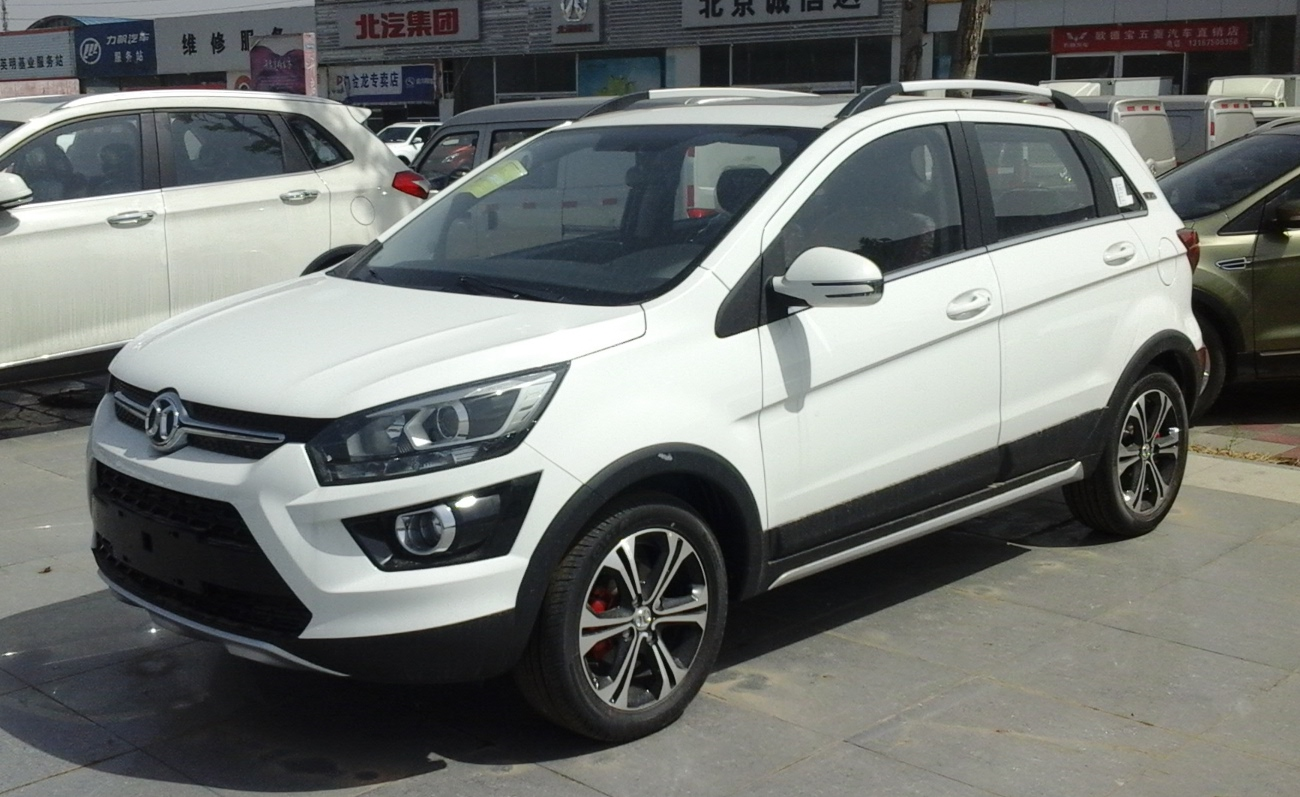
Senova X25

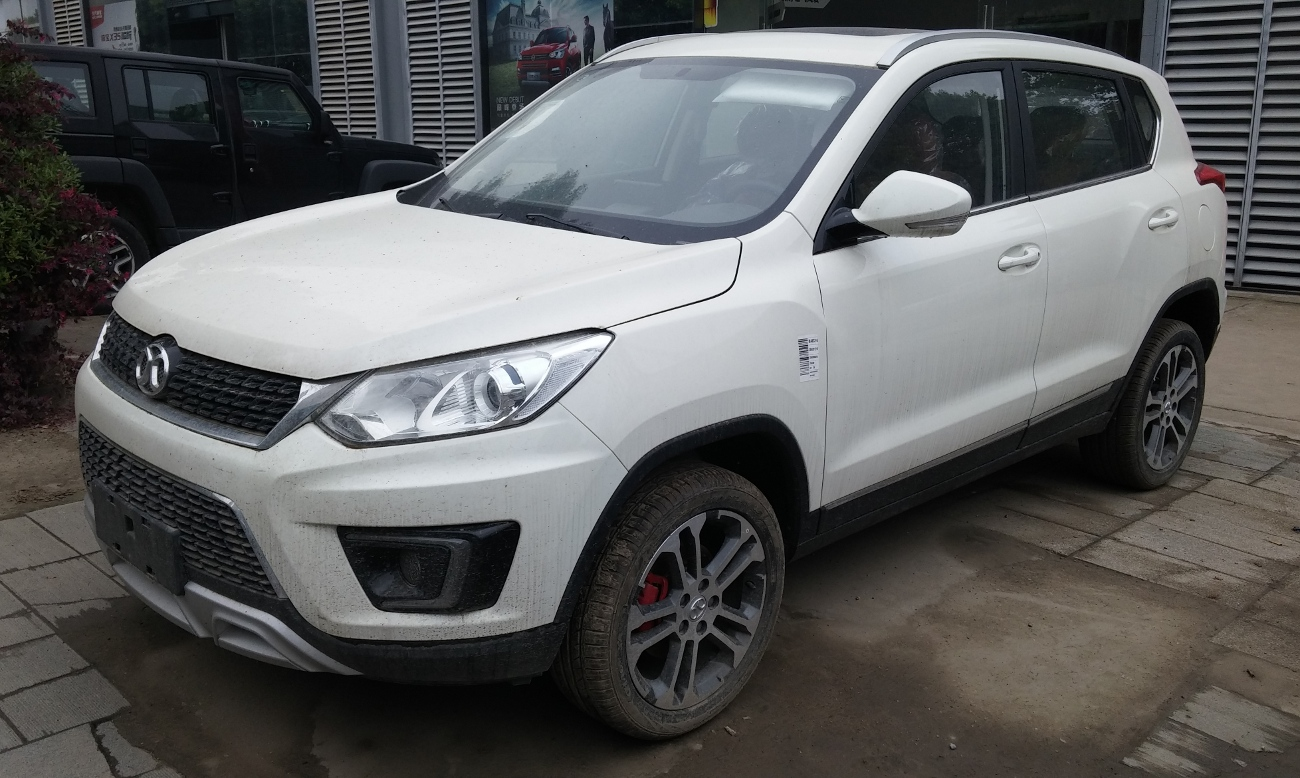
Senova X35

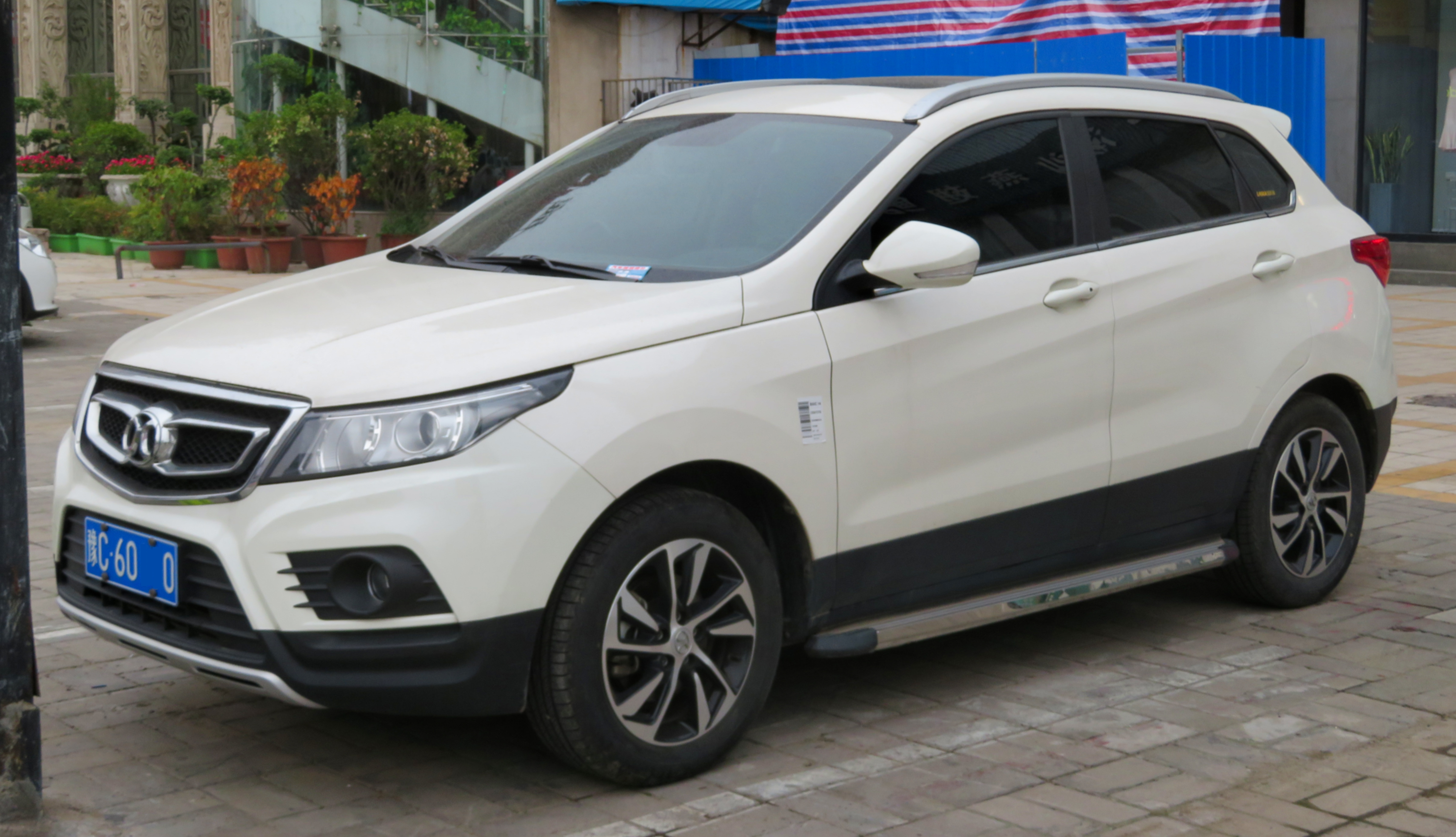
Senova X55

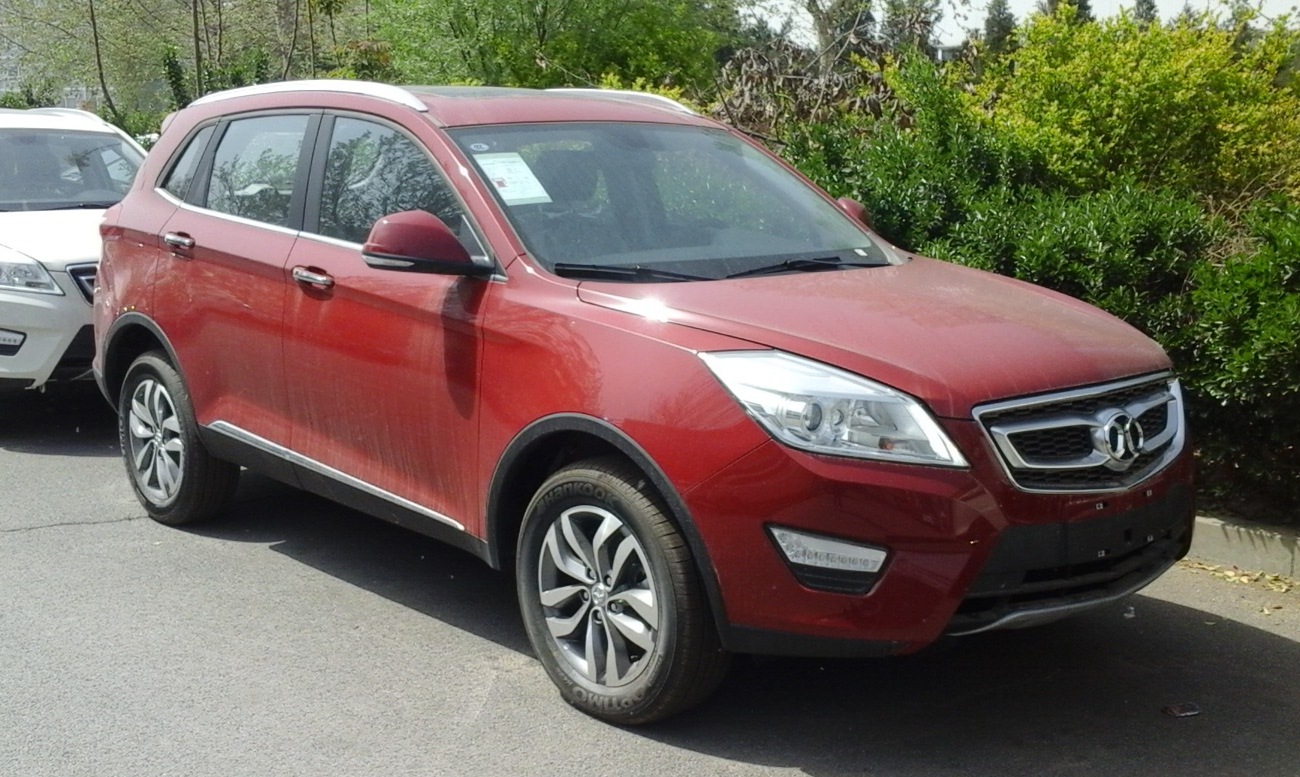
Senova X65
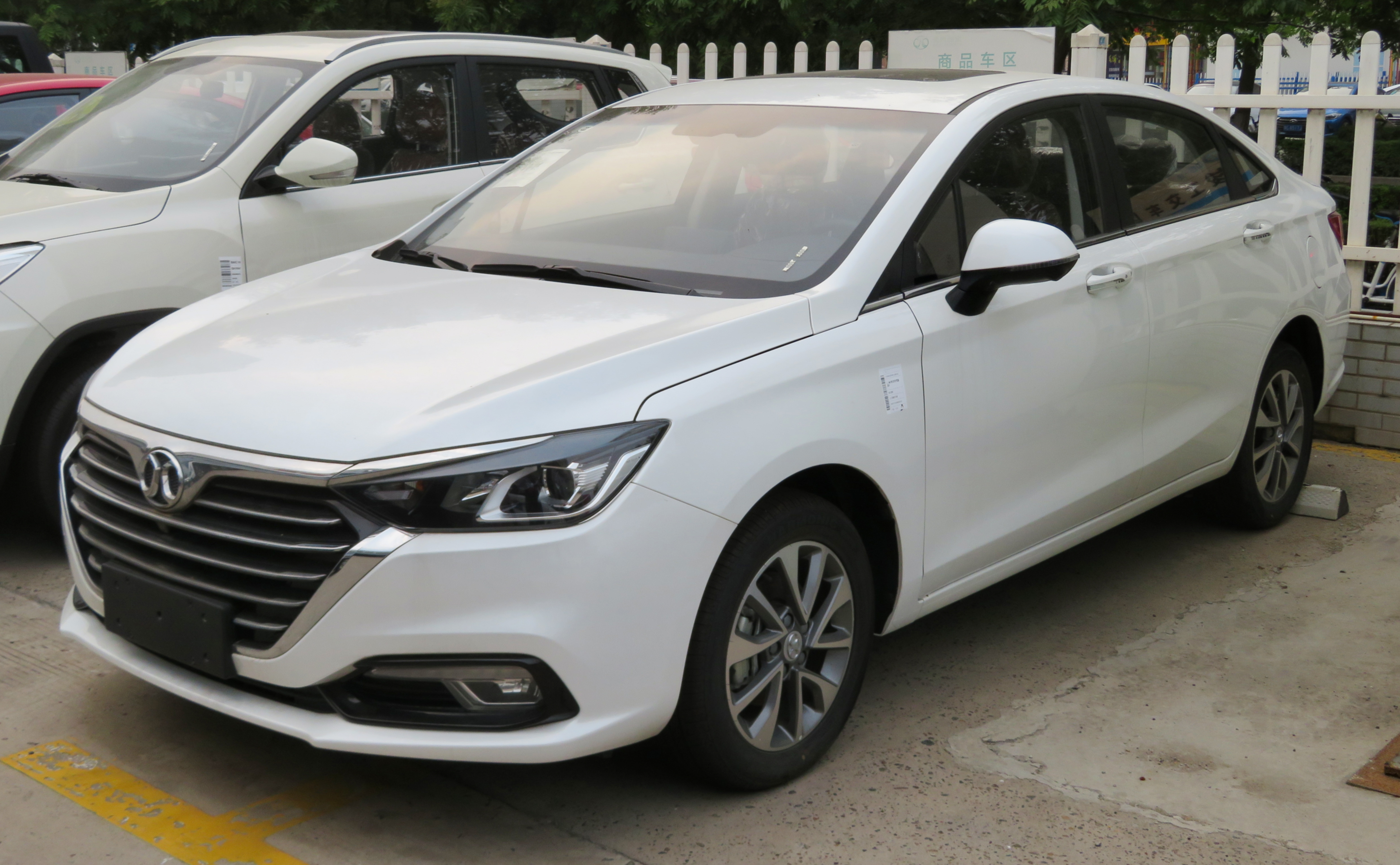
Senova D50 II

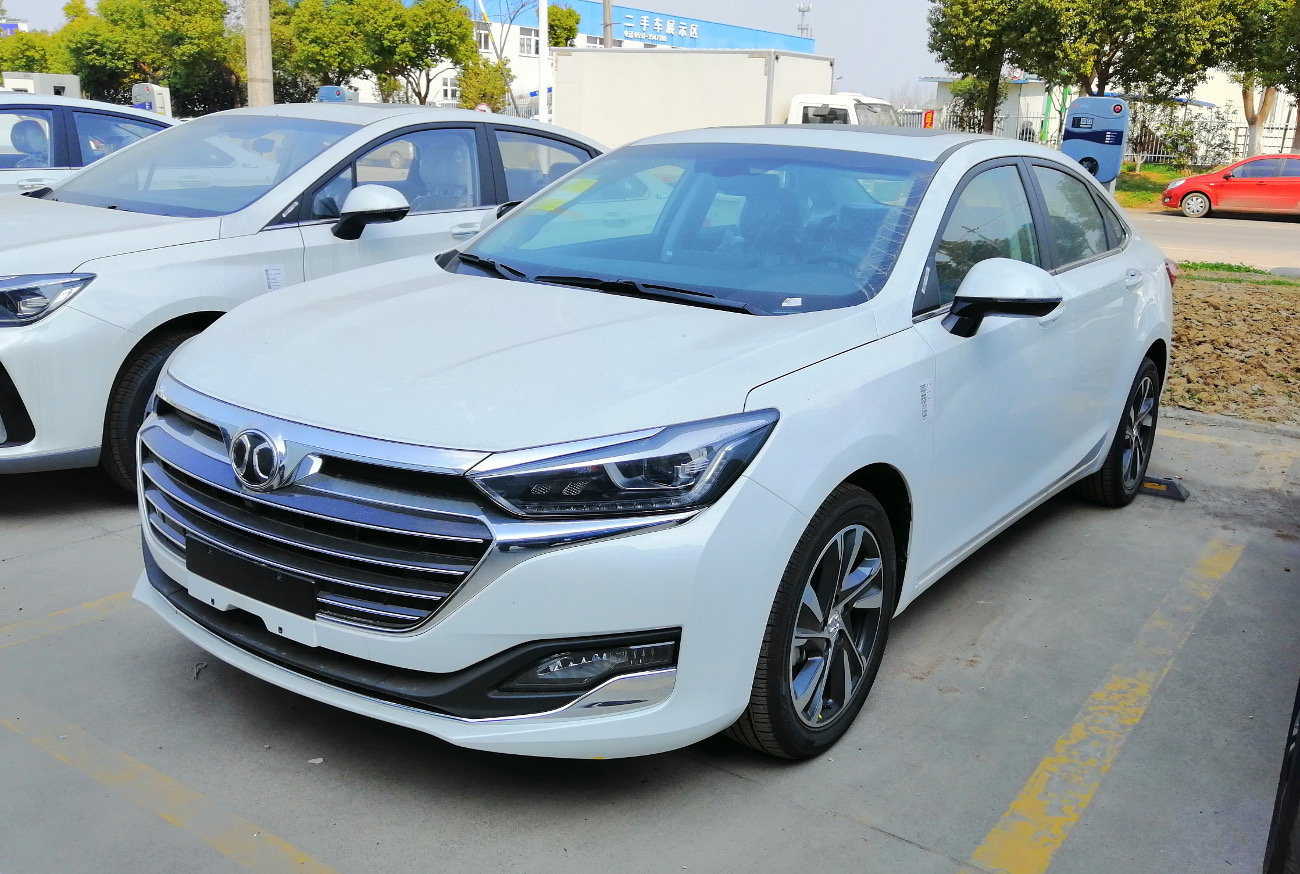
Senova Zhidao

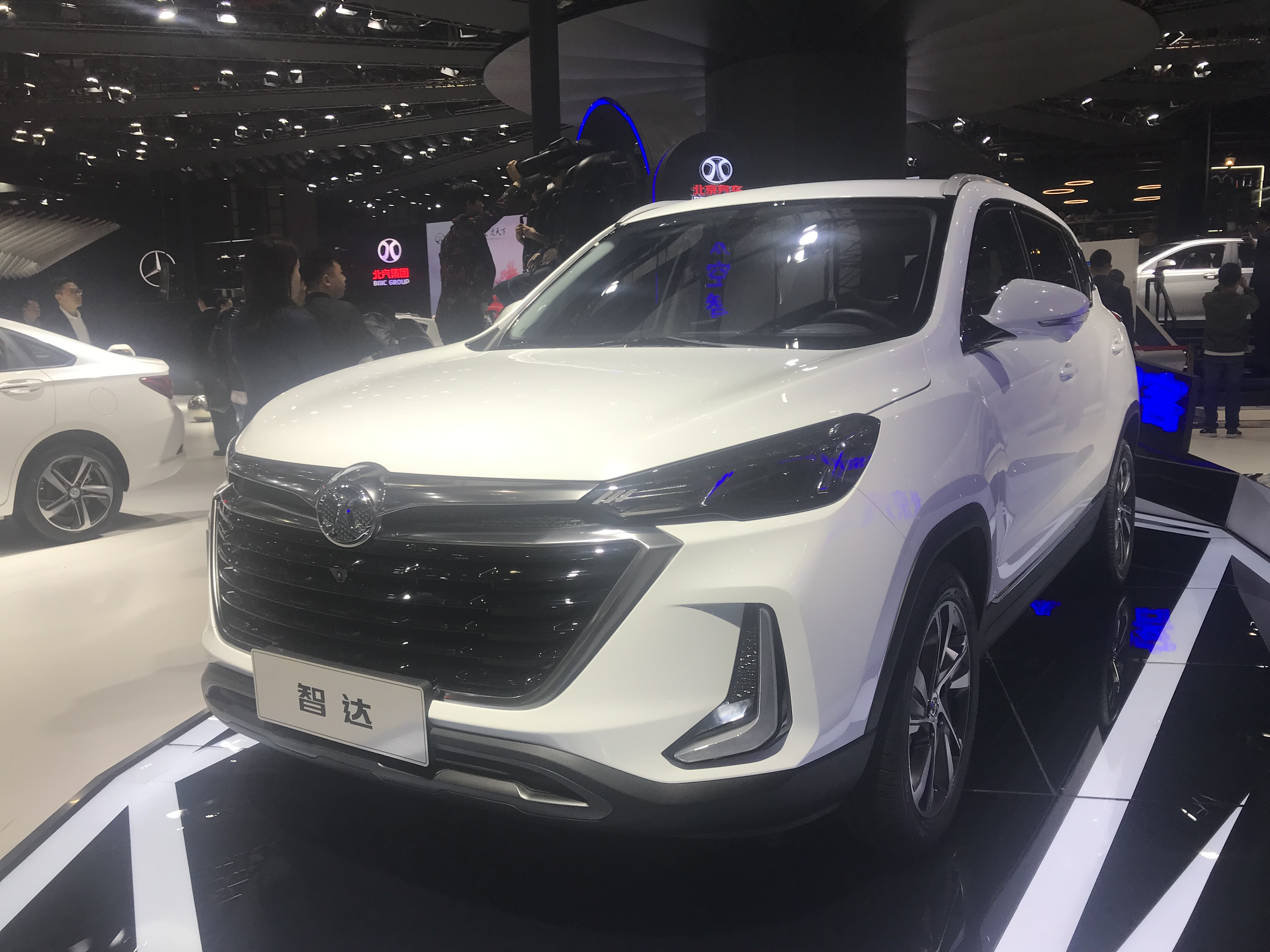
Senova Zhida

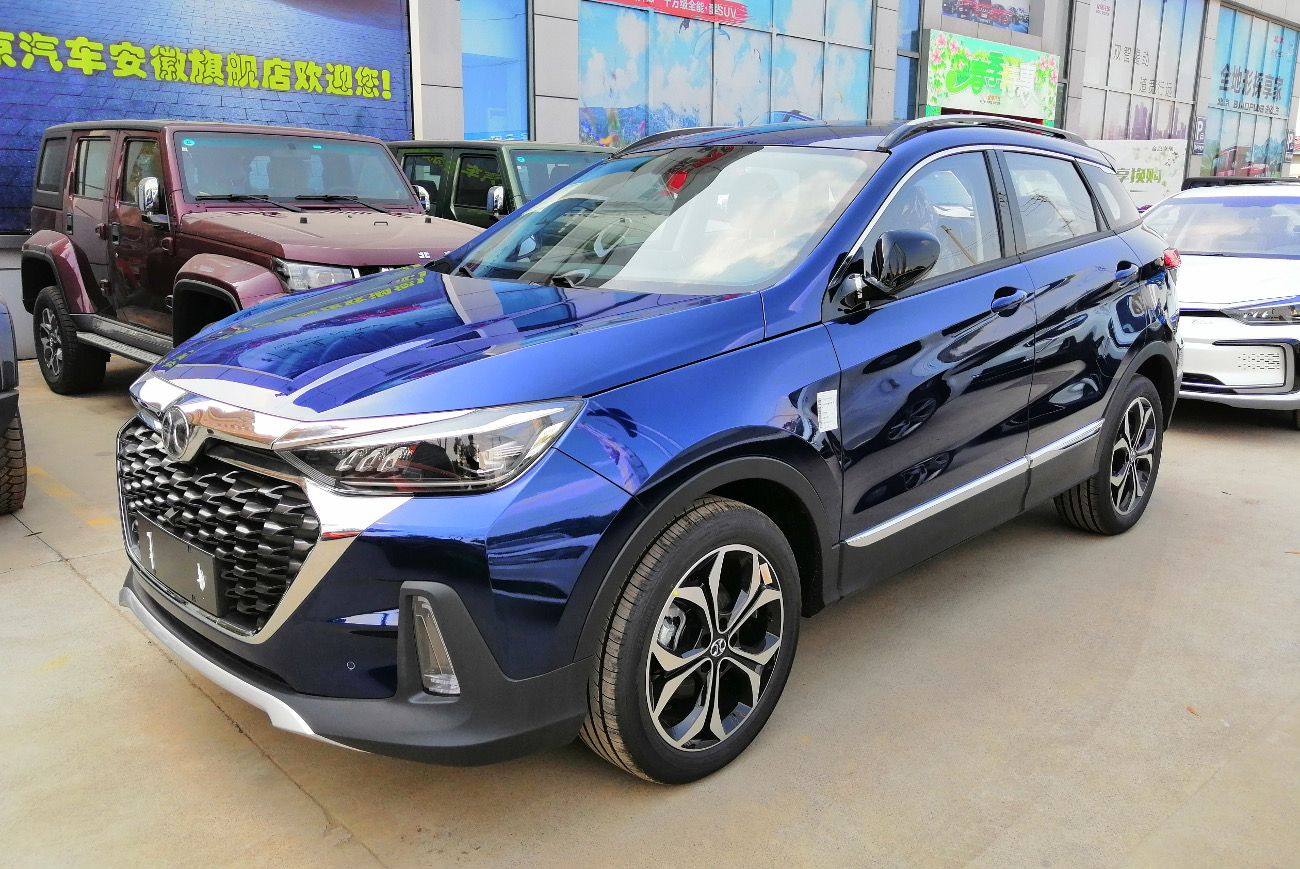
Senova Zhixing

== Concept cars ==
A number of Senova concept cars were unveiled at the 2012 Auto China, including the C50E mid-sized sedan, the C60F executive sedan, the C90L luxury sedan and the C51X SUV. Exclusively, the Concept 900 (S900) and the C90L are first prototypes of Italian design studio Fioravanti made for Senova.

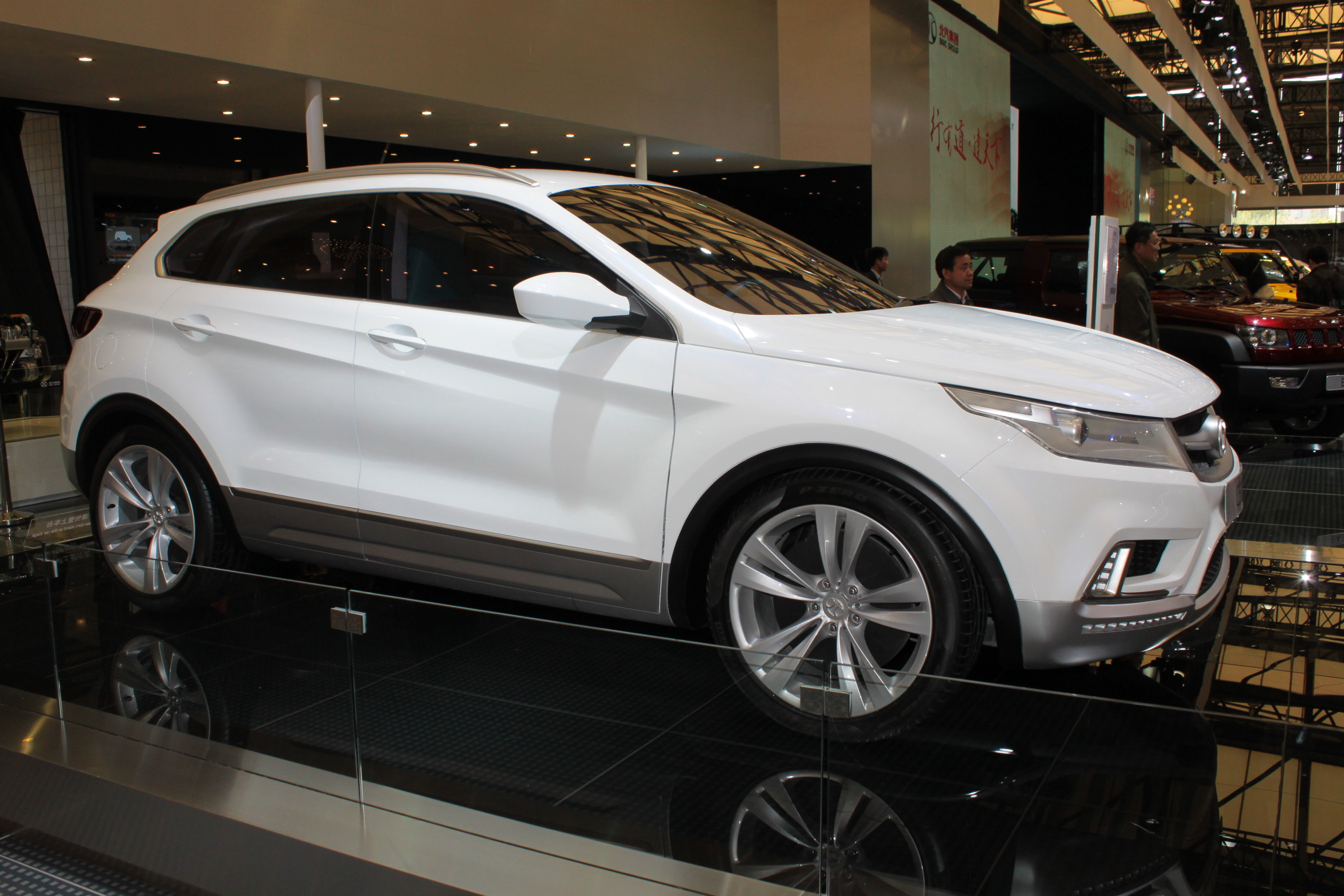
The C51X

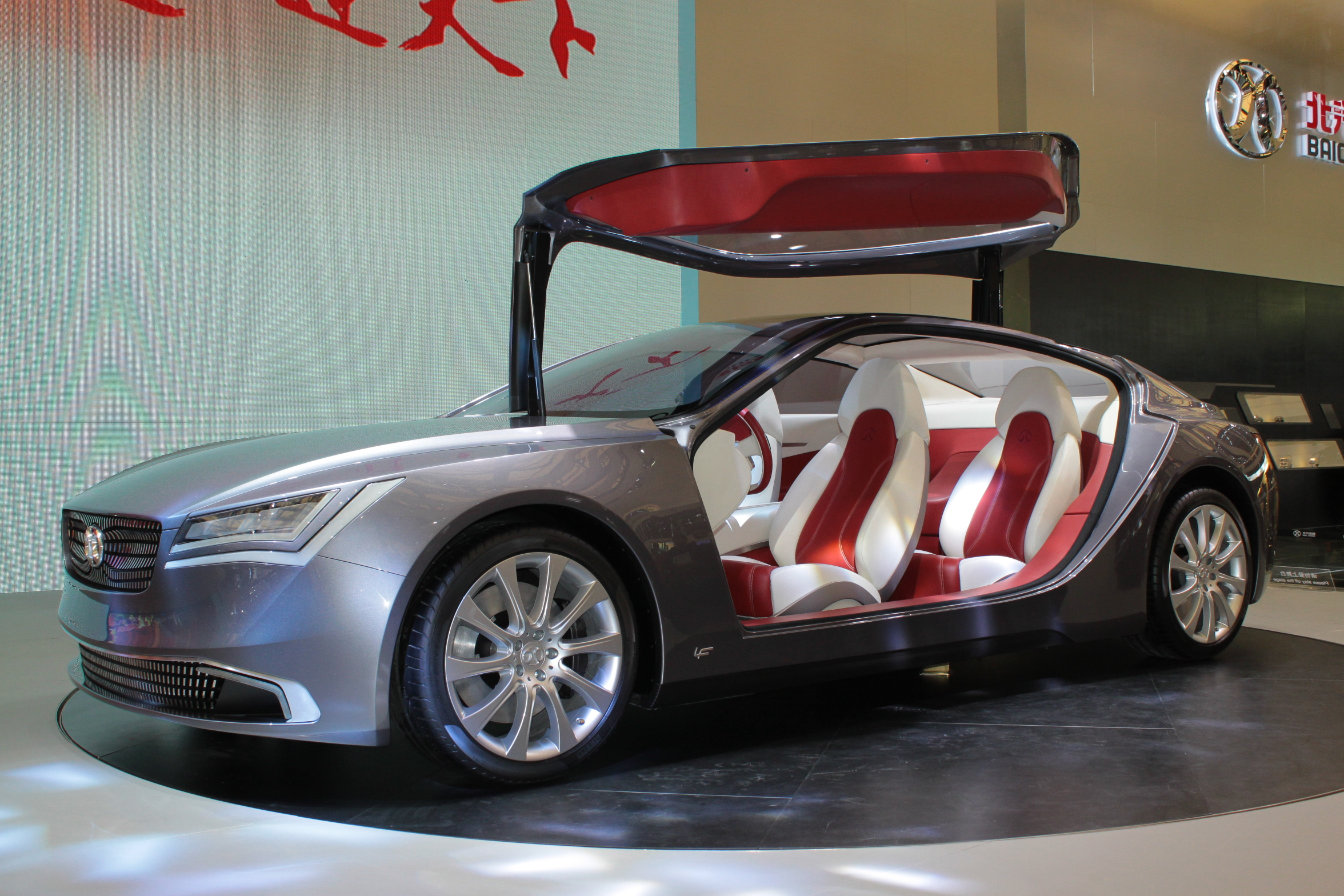
The Concept 900 designed by Fioravanti

== Sales ==
The Senova D20 sold 20,008 units from its launch in March 2012 to the end of the year. It was the first Senova model on sale in the period.
