= Cici =

Cici, CiCi or CICI may refer to:

== Persons with the name ==
- Cici (singer), South African singer-songwriter
- CiCi Bellis, American tennis player
- Cici Hong Chen, Chinese singer
- Cici Manolache, Romanian footballer
- Ciara, also known as CiCi, American singer

== Other uses ==
- Ćići, the people of the Ćićarija region in Croatia and Slovenia
- Çiçi, a village in Azerbaijan
- CiCi (EP), 2023 by Ciara
- CiCi (album), 2025 by Ciara
- Chemotherapy-induced cognitive impairment, a side effect of some cancer treatments
- CiCi's Pizza, a pizza and buffet chain
- CICI-TV, Canadian TV station
- Cici, known as Zizzy in the US, a character in the British television programme Roary the Racing Car
- Cici, the former name of the international version of Doubao

== See also ==
- Ceci
