= Sissy (disambiguation) =

Sissy is a pejorative for an effeminate boy or man.

Sissy may also refer to:

== People ==
- Sissy van Alebeek (born 1976), Dutch cyclist
- Martha Sissy Biggers (born 1957), American chef
- Rachel Dübendorfer (1900–1973), World War II resistance fighter codenamed "Sissy"
- Frances Farenthold (born 1926), American former politician, attorney, activist and educator
- Sissy Höfferer (born 1955), Austrian actress
- Sissy Löwinger (1941–2011), Austrian actress
- Sylvia Sissy Raith (born 1960), German football coach and former player
- Elizabeth Sissy Schwarz (born 1936), Austrian figure skater
- Sissy Spacek (born 1949), American actress
- Elisabeth Theurer (born 1956), Austrian equestrian
- Elisabeth Waldheim (1922–2017), First Lady of Austria from 1986 to 1992
- Empress Elisabeth of Austria (1858-1898), nicknamed "Sissy"
- Ziad El-Sissy (born 1994), Egyptian fencer
- Abdel Fattah El-Sissy (born 1954), Egyptian politician and retired military officer

== Other uses ==
- Sissy, Aisne, a commune in France
- Sissy (film), a 2022 Australian film
- Sissy: A Coming-of-Gender Story, a book by Jacob Tobia
- Sizzy, a Thai girl group whose former name was "SISSY"
- The submissive participant in feminization
- Sissy squat, a form of squat exercise

== See also ==
- The Sissies, an American pop-punk band
- Cissy (disambiguation)
- Sissi (disambiguation)
