= Qənidərə =

Coordinates: 41.221664°N 48.733921°E

- Interactive map of Qənidərə
- Country: Azerbaijan
- Rayon: Quba
- Municipality: Çiçi
- Time zone: UTC+4 (AZT)

Qənidərə is a village in the municipality of Çiçi in the Quba Rayon of Azerbaijan.
