= Ceci =

Ceci ([ˈtʃeːtʃi]) is an Italian surname that literally means "chickpeas". It may also be a given name. Notable people with the name include:

== Surname ==
- Cody Ceci (born 1993), Canadian ice hockey player
- Davide Ceci (born 1993), Italian track cyclist
- Francesco Ceci (born 1989), Italian racing cyclist
- Jesse Ceci (1924–2006), American violinist
- Joe Ceci (born 1957), Canadian politician
- Louis J. Ceci (born 1927), American jurist and legislator
- Luca Ceci (born 1993), Italian track cyclist
- Parri Ceci (born 1961), former Canadian football player
- Stephen J. Ceci, American psychologist
- Vincenzo Ceci (born 1964), former Italian cyclist

== Given name ==
- Ceci Bastida, Mexican singer-songwriter
- Ceci Flores Armenta, Mexican missing persons activist
- Ceci Hopp (born 1963), American track and field athlete
- Ceci Krasimirova (born 1980), Bulgarian fashion model
- Ceci Velasquez, American politician

== Other ==
- Ceci (footballer), nickname of Otacílio Henrique do Amparo, Brazilian footballer
- Cecy, nickname of Sylvio Moreira, Brazilian footballer
