= Raziyələr =

- Location within Azerbaijan
- Coordinates: 41°13′N 48°41′E
- Country: Azerbaijan
- Rayon: Quba
- Municipality: Çiçi
- Time zone: UTC+4 (AZT)
  - Summer (DST): UTC+5 (AZT)

Raziyələr (also, Rəzələr and Razalyar) is a village in the Quba Rayon of Azerbaijan. The village forms part of the municipality of Çiçi.
