= Beijing U7 =

Mid-size sedan

Senova D70/Zhidao/Beijing U7
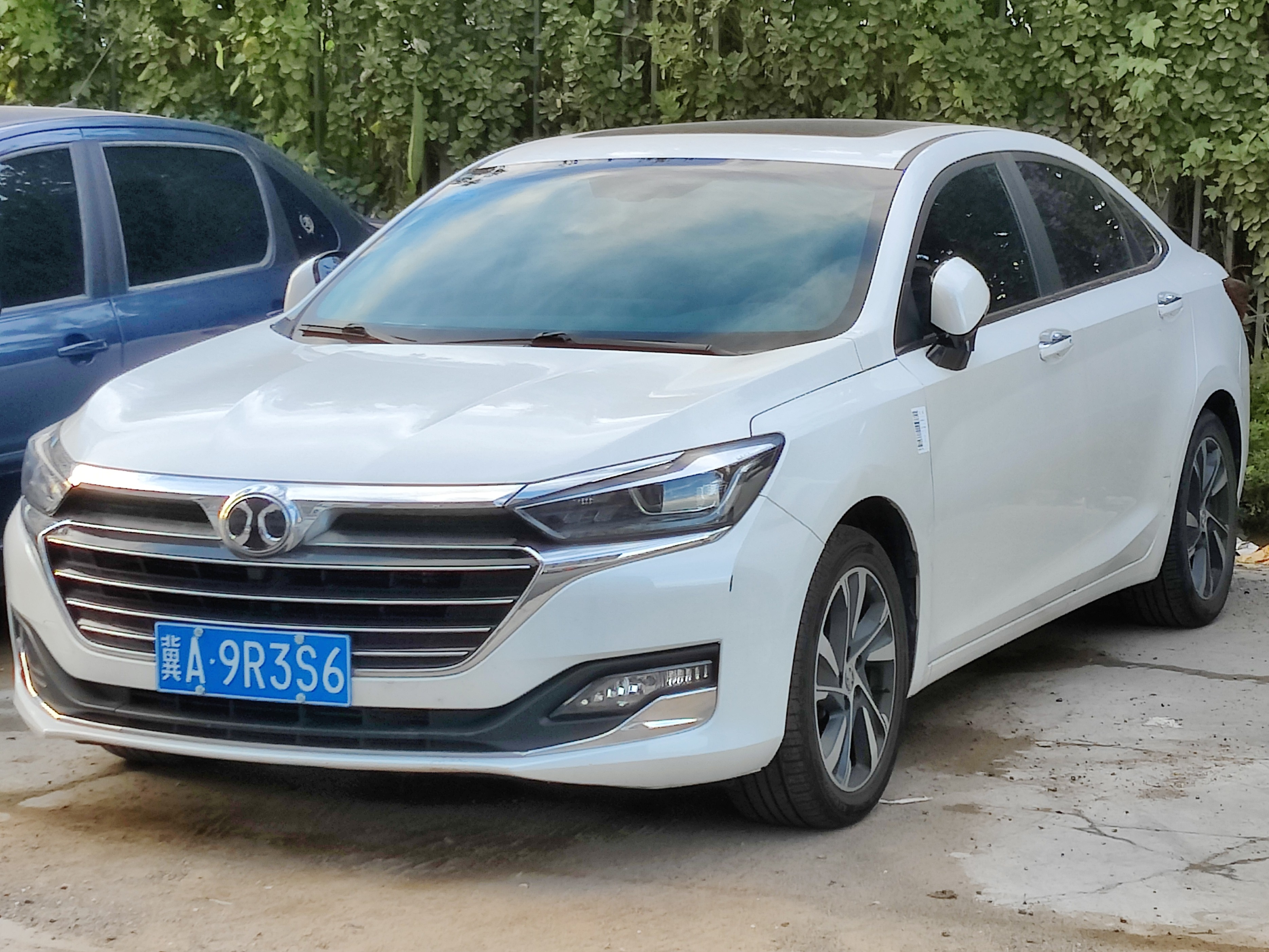
- Senova D70 Zhidao

Overview
- Manufacturer: Beijing (BAIC)
- Production: 2013–2025

Body and chassis
- Class: Mid-size car
- Body style: 4-door sedan

The Beijing U7 or previously the Senova D70 is a mid-size sedan produced by BAIC under the Senova sub-brand and later the Beijing sub-brand respectively. The model range was originally the Beijing Auto Shenbao D-Series, and renamed to Senova D70 after the launch of the Senova brand. The second generation model added an additional Chinese name, Zhidao, at launch, and was later renamed to Beijing U7 after the launch of the revamped Beijing brand.

== First generation (2013) ==
Senova D70
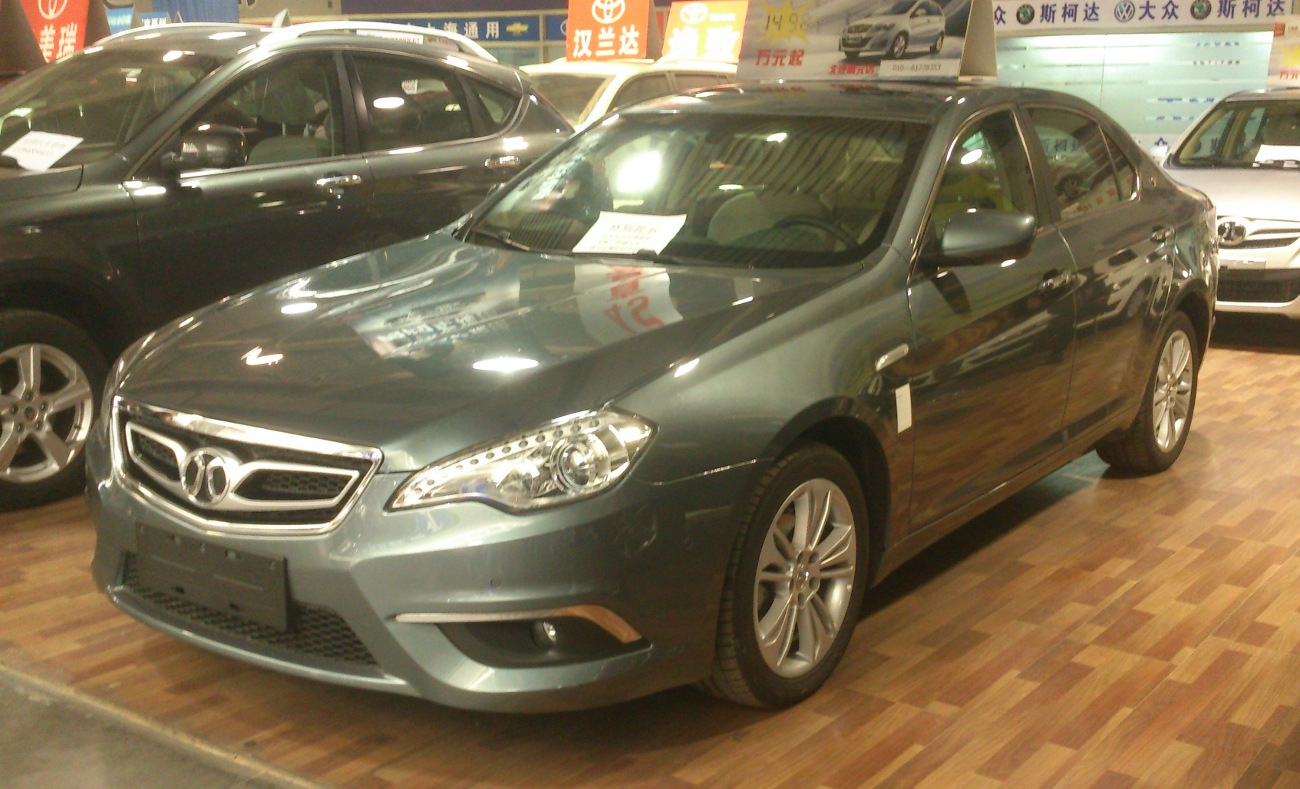

Overview
- Also called: Senova D80; BAIC Senova (Iran); Beijing Auto C70G; Beijing Auto Shenbao D-Series; Shenbao D280; Shenbao D320
- Production: 2013–2017
- Model years: 2014–2018

Body and chassis
- Layout: Transverse front-engine, front-wheel drive
- Platform: GM2900 platform
- Related: Saab 9-5; Opel Vectra; Opel Calibra; Saab 900 (NG); Saab 9-3; Saturn L-Series

Powertrain
- Engine: 1.8 L B185R I4 turbo (petrol); 2.0 L B205 I4 turbo (petrol); 2.3 L B235 I4 turbo (petrol)
- Transmission: 5-speed automatic

Dimensions
- Wheelbase: 2,755 mm (108.5 in); 2,830 mm (111.4 in) (Senova D80)
- Length: 4,861 mm (191.4 in); 4,946 mm (194.7 in) (Senova D80)
- Width: 1,820 mm (71.7 in); 1,860 mm (73.2 in) (Senova D80)
- Height: 1,462 mm (57.6 in); 1,483 mm (58.4 in) (Senova D80)

The Senova D70 was formerly known as the Beijing Auto Shenbao D-Series which came in two trim levels, the Shenbao D280 and the Shenbao D320. It was previewed by the Beijing Auto C70G prototype. The Shenbao D-Series was based on the Saab 9-5 and it debuted on the 2013 Shanghai Auto Show and was launched on the Chinese car market on May 11, 2013. Pricing ranges from 165,800 yuan to 235,800 yuan.

The Beijing Auto Senova D-Series was renamed to Beijing Auto Senova D70 in 2014, bringing the name in line with the rest of the range and repositioning the car under the Senova brand with an updated price range from 139,800 yuan to 215,800 yuan. The Senova D70 is powered by a range of engine options including a 1.8 liter turbo engine producing 177 hp (132 kW; 179 PS), a 2.0 liter turbo engine producing 204 hp (152 kW; 207 PS), and a 2.3 liter turbo engine producing 250 hp (186 kW; 253 PS), all mated to a five-speed automatic transmission.

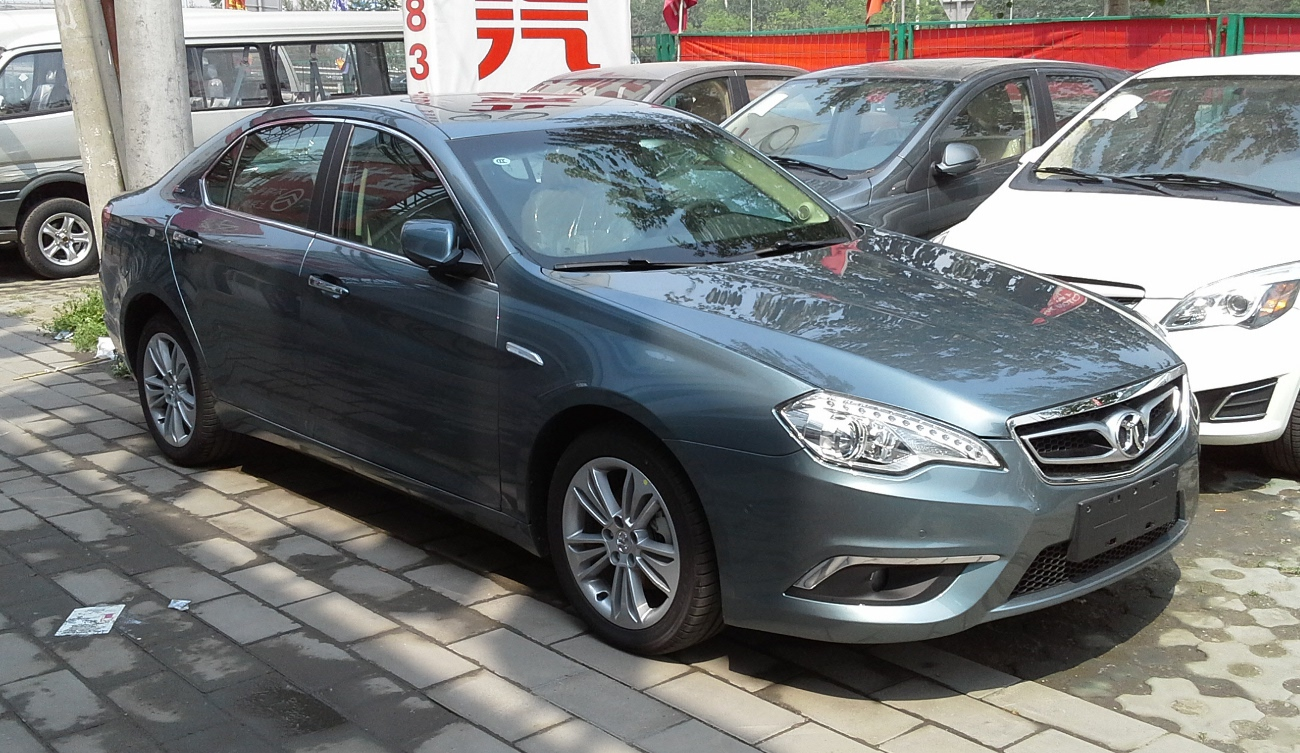
Senova D70 front

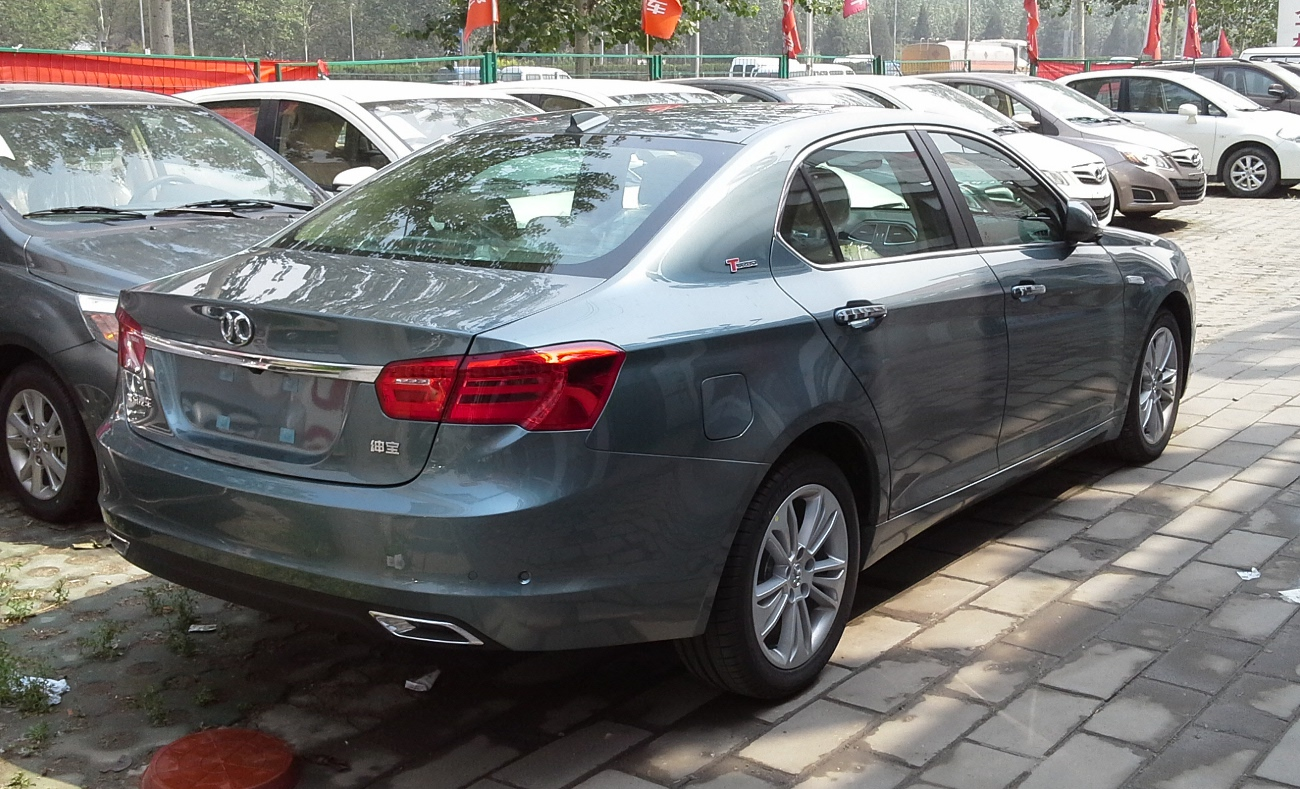
Senova D70 rear

=== Senova D80 ===
The Senova D80 debuted during the 2014 Guangzhou Auto Show as the flagship executive car of the Senova brand, it is the stretched and premium variant of the Senova D70 (D-Series). The Senova D80 is powered by the same engines as the D70 including a 1.8 liter turbo engine producing 177 hp (132 kW; 179 PS), a 2.0 liter turbo engine producing 204 hp (152 kW; 207 PS), and a 2.3 liter turbo engine producing 250 kW (335 hp; 340 PS). Production started in April 2015 and ended in 2017. In comparison to the D70, the D80 is 85mm longer, 40mm wider and 21mm higher. It also has an extra 75mm wheelbase. Before its official launch, a luxury sedan concept designed by Italian studio Fioravanti called the C90L, was shown in 2012 Auto China. The D80 is said to be a production version of this concept.

== Second Generation (2018) ==
Senova Zhidao
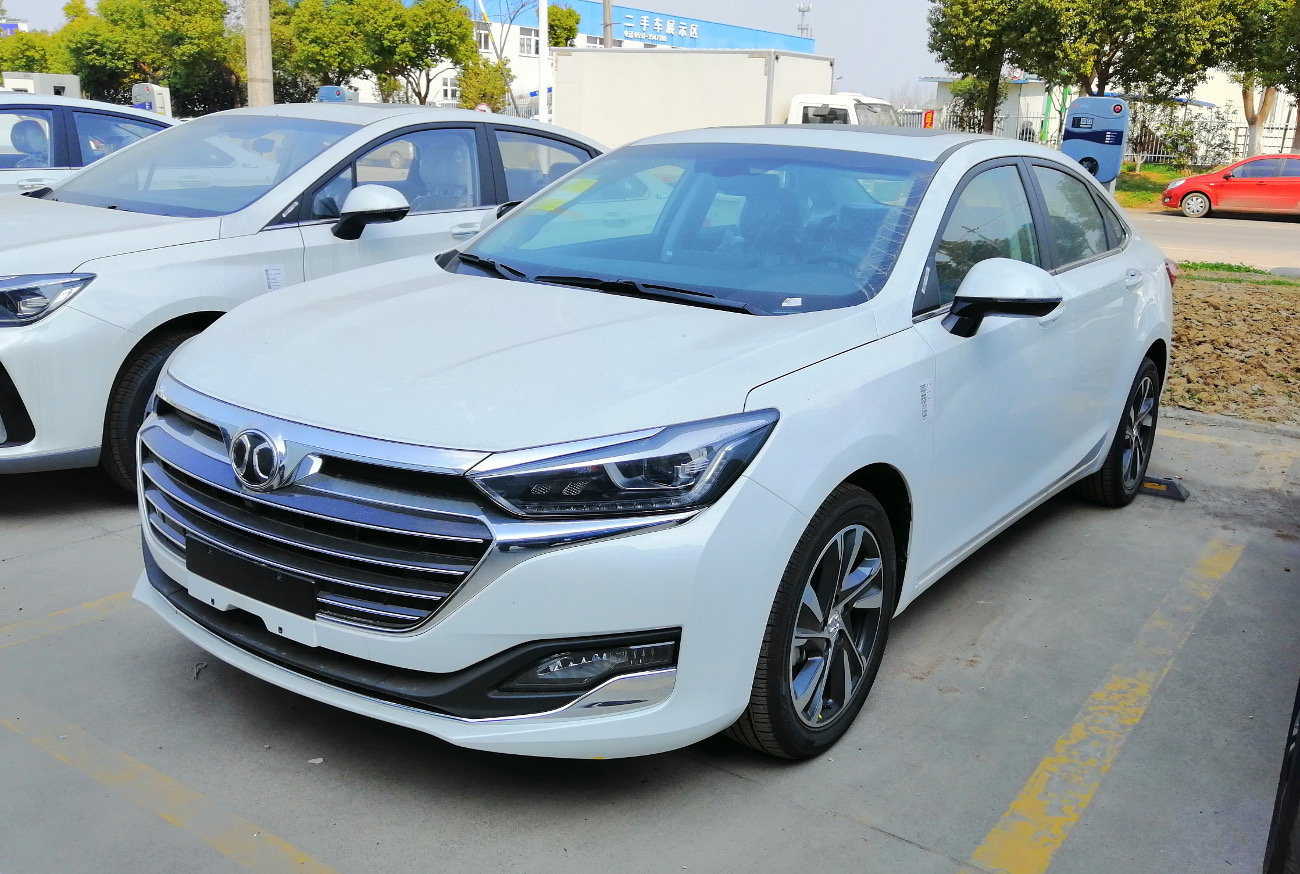

Overview
- Also called: Beijing U7
- Production: 2018–2025
- Model years: 2019–2026
- Assembly: Zengcheng, China
- Designer: Lowie Vermeersch at Granstudio

Body and chassis
- Layout: Front-engine, front-wheel drive

Powertrain
- Engine: 1.5 L A151 I4 (turbo petrol)
- Transmission: 6-speed manual CVT

Dimensions
- Wheelbase: 2,780 mm (109.4 in)
- Length: 4,785 mm (188.4 in)
- Width: 1,835 mm (72.2 in)
- Height: 1,490 mm (58.7 in)

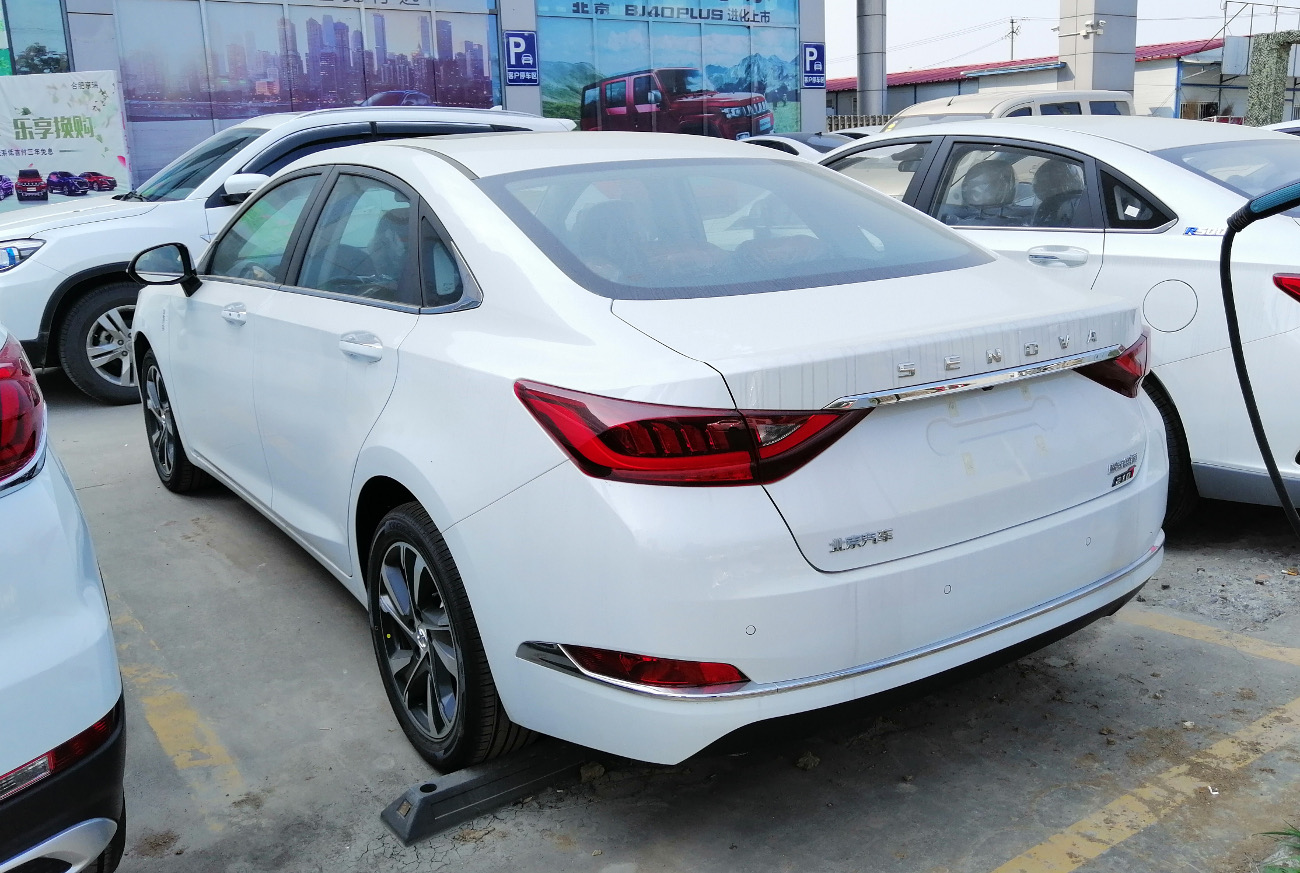
Senova D70 II (Zhidao) rear

The second generation Senova D70 was unveiled in October 2018 with the Chinese name "Zhidao" (智道), and featuring the new "Offspace" design language.

As of 2019, the D70 is renamed as Beijing U7 in order to be in line with the range of the new Beijing brand. The Zhidao or Beijing U7 is powered by two different 1.5 liter turbo engines producing 110 kW (148 hp) and 120 kW (161 hp) respectively and a maximum torque of 210 N⋅m (155 lb⋅ft) for the former. Engines are mated to a CVT gearbox and a 6-speed automatic gearbox.

As of 2020, the second generation model was later renamed to Beijing U7 after the launch of the revamped Beijing brand.

=== Beijing EU7 ===
In September 2019, BAIC Group launched sales of the all-electric sedan called the Beijing EU7 in China. The Beijing EU7 is a mid-size electric sedan based on the Beijing U7 or previously the Senova Zhidao (D70/U7).

The electric executive EU7 is powered by an electric motor rated at 163 kW (219 hp) and connected to a bottom-mounted traction battery. BAIC claims the EU7 has 450 kilometers (280 miles) of NEDC-rated range.

Technology features of the EU7 include multilink spring-based suspension for extra comfort in long journeys, climate control system, panoramic roof, a 12-inch multimedia display, a digital dashboard, and a 360-degree car camera system. The Beijing EU7 starts from 160,000 Chinese Yuan on its domestic market (~US$22,500) with the state subsidies applied.

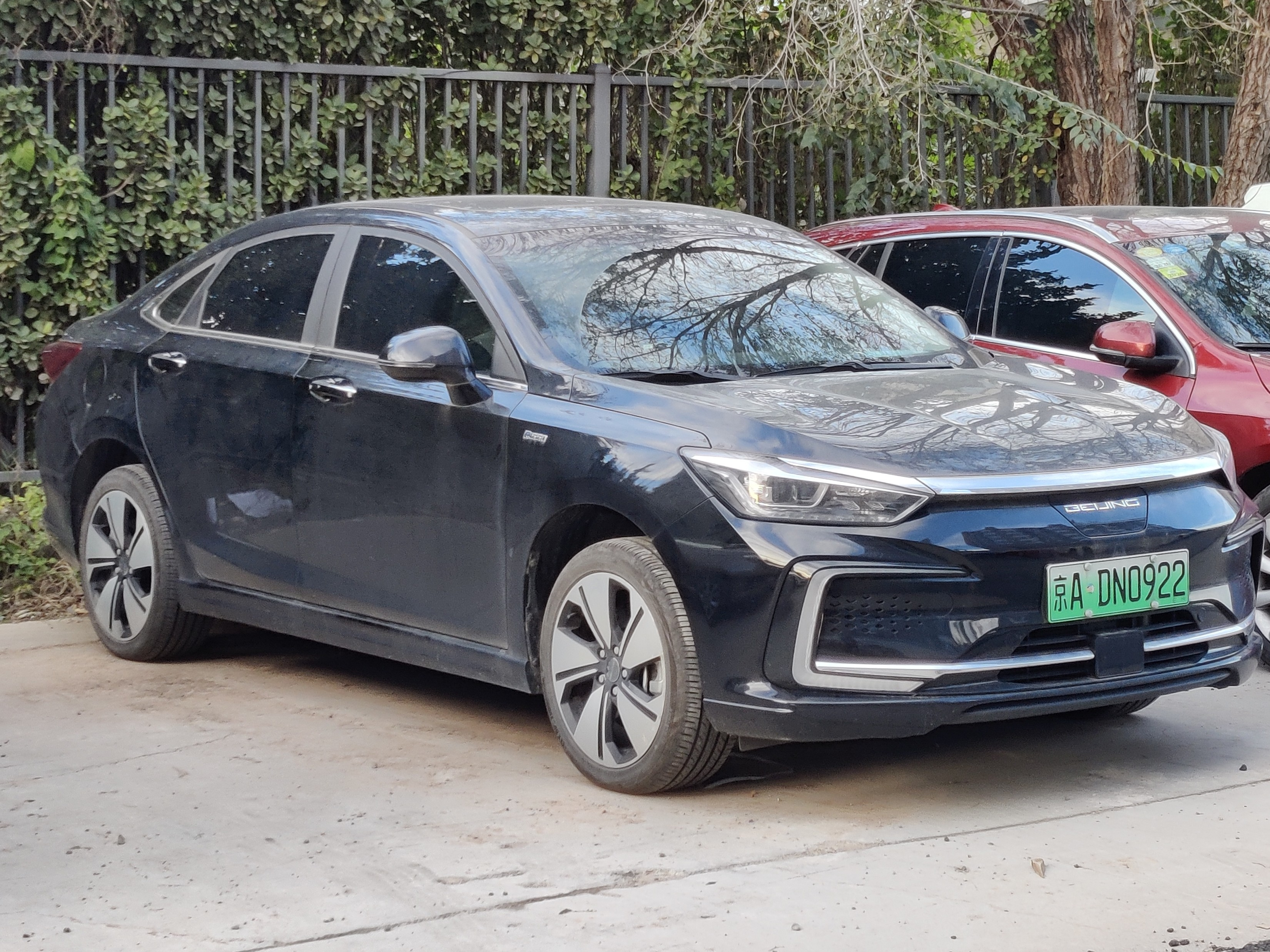
Beijing EU7 front

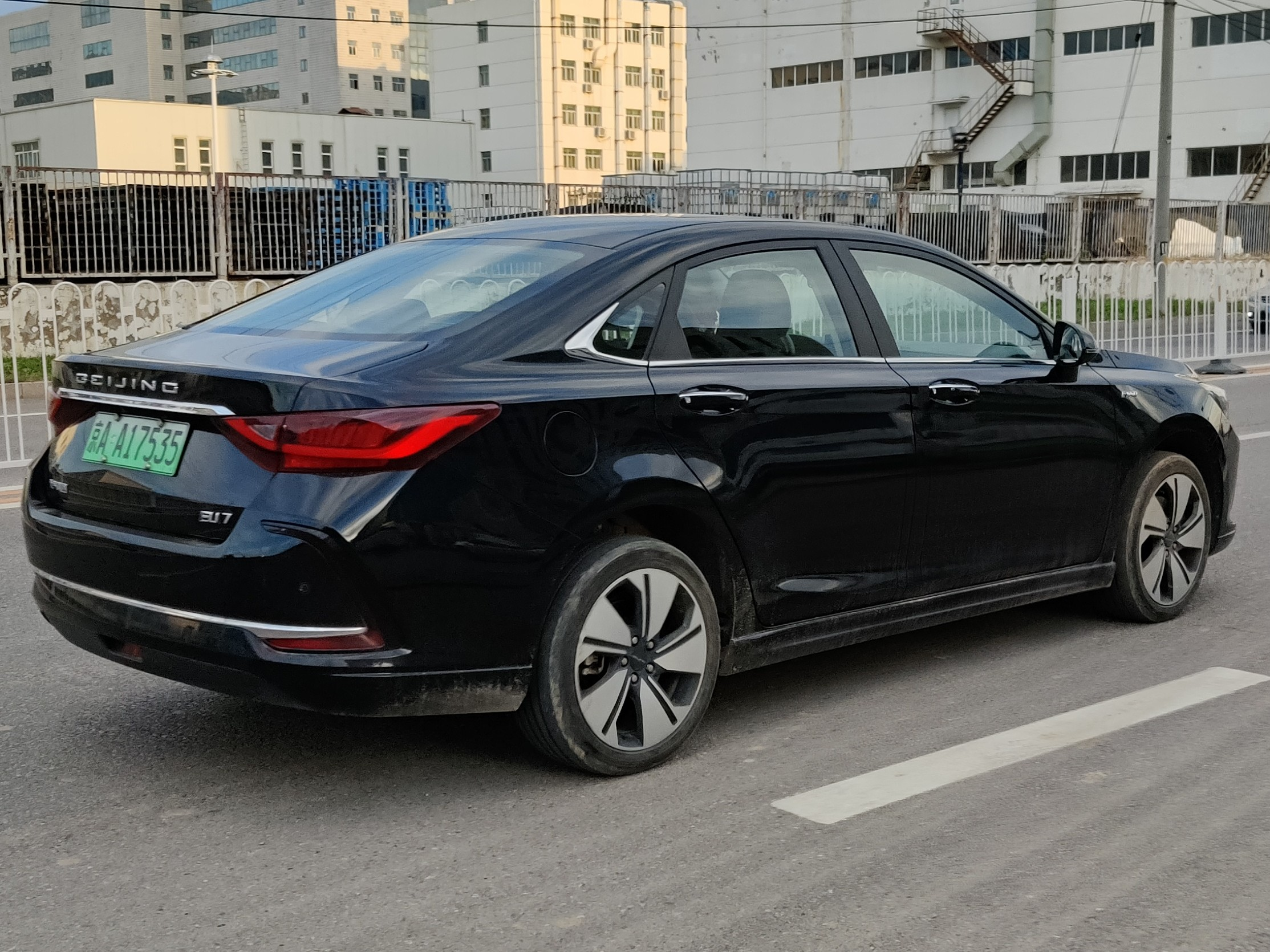
Beijing EU7 rear

== Sales ==
Year	China
2023	1,003
2024	56
2025	45
