= Cissy =

Cissy, Cissie or Cissi may refer to:

== People ==
- Cissy Chandler (died 1954), wife of American author Raymond Chandler
- Cissie Caudeiron (1909–1968), Creole nationalist and folklorist
- Cissi Elwin Frenkel (born 1965), Swedish journalist and television presenter
- Zainunnisa Gool (1897–1963), anti-apartheid political and civil rights leader in South Africa, nicknamed "Cissie"
- Cissy Houston (1933–2024), American singer
- Cissy Jones, American BAFTA-award-winning video game voice actress
- Cissy King (born 1946), American-born singer and dancer
- Cissi Klein (1929-1943), Norwegian Jewish girl who is commemorated every year as one of the victims of the Holocaust
- Cissy Patterson (1884-1948), American writer and newspaper owner
- Cecilia Loftus (1876–1943), Scottish actress and singer, nicknamed "Cissie" or "Cissy"
- Cecilia Östlund (born 1988), Swedish curler, nicknamed "Cissi"
- Cissie Stewart (1911–2008), British swimmer
- Cissy Stuart (1914–1989), American newspaper owner and crime victim

== Film and TV ==
- Narcissa Malfoy, nicknamed "Cissy", from the Harry Potter stories
- Cissy Davis, a character in the U.S. TV series Family Affair
- A character in Cissie and Ada, a British television skit from the 1970s and 1980s
- "The Cissy", an episode of the television series South Park

== Other uses ==
- Cissi, an Ancient Roman name for Djinet
- "The Cissy", a song by The Action
- A British spelling variation of sissy
- Cisgender or cissexual in LGBT slang

== See also ==
- Sissy (disambiguation)
- Sissi (disambiguation)
