= Cecilia (McClure novel) =

1993 novel by Julie McClure

- Author: Julie McClure
- Language: English
- Genre: Historical, Romance novel
- Published: 1993 (Harris Press)
- Publication place: Canada
- Media type: Print (Paperback)
- ISBN: 0-9696956-0-8
- OCLC: 28500237

Cecilia is a historical romance novel by Julie McClure (ISBN 0-9696956-0-8). The novel was published in 1993 by Harris Press in Port Perry, Ontario and featured cover art by Fran Usher. The story begins in the mid-19th century and follows the life of the title character, Cecilia Preston.

The backcover of the novel reads:

"Love could only bring heartache, torment and strife to Lord Turner Collingwood and lowly house-servant Cecilia Preston. Yet, fall in love they did - deeply, hopelessly and forever. Could their burning desire and devotion survive the test of time and London's heartless aristocratic society? Follow the lives of Cecilia and her handsome Lord. Journey across oceans, years and a lifetime of passion-packed adventure. Theirs is a story that will touch the very heart and soul of the reader".

== Characters ==
Cecilia Preston: Main character. Described as being small in build with beautiful auburn hair and fair skin.
Turner Collingwood: A wealthy Lord born into London high society. He is Cecilia's first love and fathers two of her children.
Thomas Howley: A reporter in Northern England who marries Cecilia. He is the father of Cecilia's third child.
Eric Galbraith: Turner's best friend and Nancy's brother. He has drinking problems and is deserted by his wife Penelope.
Nancy Galbraith: An evil character who deeply hates Cecilia. Nancy is in love with Turner and seeks revenge against Cecilia for her relationship with him.
Elwood Thorpe: A wealthy aristocrat in the same social circle as the Collingwood and Galbraith families. He is portrayed as a weakling and marries Nancy.
Lord Glenroy Collingwood: Turner's father. He enlists Turner in the army and sends him to India when he discovers his son's affair with the house servant Cecilia.
Lady Marjorie Collingwood: Turner's mother who is deeply devastated by her husband's banishment of Turner to India.
Lord Basil Galbraith: Father of Eric and Nancy, husband of Lady Agnes. Cecilia's employer at the beginning of the novel.
Lady Agnes Galbraith: Mother of Eric and Nancy, wife of Lord Basil.
Andrea: The only child of a Major who marries Turner after he travels to Australia to start a factory business.
Louise: Cecilia's sister who lives in Leeds. Wife of James.
James: Cecilia's brother-in-law. He works at the mines and lives modestly with his wife Louise.
Penelope Concord: A snotty aristocrat who Eric falls in love with and marries. She eventually leaves him to sail to America with her lover.
Joe and Sally Webster: A poor farming couple who decide to start a better life and move to Canada. Right before departing, they visit an orphanage and are mistakenly allowed to adopt Cecilia's second child.
