= Cecilia (Refice opera) =

1934 opera by Licinio Refice

Cecilia is a 1934 sacred opera by Licinio Refice to a libretto by Emidio Mucci. At the premiere in Rome in February 1934 Claudia Muzio sung the role of Cecilia. The Act 3 aria "Grazie sorelle" has since been recorded by several sopranos including Renata Tebaldi in 1955, and Hera Hyesang Park in 2024.

== Roles ==
- L’Angelo di Dio (soprano)
- Cecilia (soprano)
- Valeriano (tenor)
- Tiburzio / Amachio: (baritone)
- La vecchia cieca (mezzo-soprano)
- Il Vescovo Urbano (bass)
- Un liberto/un neofita: (tenor)
- A slave (baritone)

== Discography ==
- 1973 live, abridged - Renata Scotto (St Cecilia), Harry Theyard (Valerian), George Fourié (Almachis) directed Angelo Campori VAI 73 minutes
- 2015 Denia Mazzola Gavazzeni (soprano), Fabrizio Mercurio, Pilade Carrai, Corrado Cappitta (baritone), Giuseppe Veneziano (tenor), Kulli Tomingas (mezzo-soprano), Riccardo Ristori (baritone), Serena Pasquini Orchestra Filarmonica Italiana, Coro la Camerata di Cremona, Marco Fracassi Bongiovanni 2CD 2 hours 6 minutes
- live 2022 Elena Schirru, Marta Mari, Mickael Spadaccini, Leon Kim, Orchestra del Teatro Lirico di Cagliari, Giuseppe Grazioli. Dynamic, 2CD 1 hour 53 minutes
