= Sissi =

Sissi or Sisi may refer to:

== People ==
- Empress Elisabeth of Austria (1837–1898), known as "Sisi" or "Sissi"; spouse of Franz Joseph I of Austria
  - Works about Sissi
    - Sissi film trilogy with Romy Schneider:
      - Sissi (film), 1955 Austrian historical romance film
      - Sissi – The Young Empress (Sissi – Die junge Kaiserin), 1956
      - Sissi – Fateful Years of an Empress (Sissi – Schicksalsjahre einer Kaiserin), 1957
    - Princess Sissi, 1997 animated series
    - Sisi (miniseries), 2009 miniseries directed by Xaver Schwarzenberg, with Cristiana Capotondi
    - Sisi (2021), television series, featuring Dominique Devenport
- Abdel Fattah el-Sisi (born 1954), President of Egypt since 2014
- Ali Tneich (born 1992), known as "Sisi", Lebanese footballer
- Seyhan Soylu, known as "Sissi", Turkish television personality
- Sisi Rondina (born 1996), Filipino volleyball player
- Sisi Zlatanova, Bulgarian researcher in geospatial data
- Sisi (footballer) (born 1986), Spanish footballer Sisinio González Martínez known as "Sisi"
- Sissi (footballer) (born 1967), Brazilian football player Sisleide do Amor Lima known as "Sissi"
- Sissi (singer) (born 1999), Italian singer-songwriter
- Sissi Christidou (born 1980), Greek television presenter

== Localities ==
- Sisi, Crete, a place in Crete, Greece

== Other uses ==
- Elisabeth Delmas, nicknamed "Sissi", a character in the French animated television series Code Lyoko and its incomplete sequel series Code Lyoko: Evolution
- Sisi (drink), a Dutch fruit-flavoured beverage
- Sissi (Finnish light infantry), a specialized type of Finnish soldier
- Sissi, name given to the exoplanet HAT-P-14b, which orbits the star HAT-P-14 in the constellation of Hercules

== See also ==
- Cissy (disambiguation)
- Sissy (disambiguation)
