= Jesse Ceci =

American violinist (1924–2006)

Jesse Arthur Ceci
- Born: February 2, 1924; Philadelphia, Pennsylvania
- Died: May 10, 2006 (aged 82); Centennial, Colorado
- Occupations: Violinist and concertmaster
- Notable work: Performed solo violin work for Rudolf Nureyev

Jesse Arthur Ceci (February 2, 1924 – May 10, 2006) was a violinist and former concertmaster, most notably of the Colorado Symphony Orchestra (CSO), the Minnesota Orchestra and the National Ballet of Canada in Toronto where he did all of the solo work for Rudolf Nureyev.

Born in Philadelphia, Pennsylvania, Ceci had a versatile and distinguished career. A child prodigy, he began his studies at Curtis Institute of Music on a full scholarship at the age of eight. He continued his studies at the Juilliard School of Music from which he graduated with a Bachelor of Science, the Paris Conservatory, and L’Ecole Normale de Musique on a Fulbright Scholarship. He also received a Master of Music from Manhattan School of Music and won the prestigious George Wedge Prize at Juilliard and First Prize at the L’Ecole Normale de Musique Competition in Paris.

== Career ==
Ceci made his debut at Alice Tully Hall at New York's Lincoln Center and did four performances in New York City at Town Hall. His first position was as associate concertmaster with the New Orleans Philharmonic Orchestra. He was then chosen among 47 contestants to play in the Boston Symphony under Charles Münch. He also played in the New York Philharmonic under the direction of Leonard Bernstein, Zimbler Sinfonietta in Boston, and was concertmaster with the Esterhazy Chamber Orchestra and the Minnesota Orchestra. He was also guest concertmaster with the Pittsburgh Symphony and played at the Hollywood Bowl, and he toured worldwide with the Cleveland Orchestra under the direction of George Szell, Lorin Maazel, Erich Leinsdorf and Stanislaus Skrowaczewski. Ceci performed under the direction of major conductors including Bruno Walter, Eugene Ormandy, Dimitris Mitropoulos, Igor Stravinsky, Jean Martinon, Zuben Mehta, William Steinberg, Sir John Barbirolli, Karl Boehm, Daniel Barenboim, Paul Hindemith and Leopold Stokowski to name a few.

He performed many recitals in the United States, Mexico, Central America, the Caribbean, Canada, Australia, Europe, Israel, Russia and the Far East including the Marlboro Festival in Vermont, Casals Festivals in Puerto Rico, Grand Teton Festival in Wyoming, where he was concertmaster, the Royal Chamber Orchestra of Japan, New York Philomusica Chamber Ensemble, St. Louis Sinfonietta, and was first violinist in the New York String Quartet.

Ceci made many solo appearances including the Denver Chamber Orchestra, Royal Metropolitan Orchestra of Japan, Shizuoka Symphony Orchestra, Osaka Municipal Band, The Mozart Festival in Whistler, British Columbia, Bach Carmel festival in Carmel-by-the-Sea, California, Colorado Music Festival, Minnesota Orchestra, Esterhazy Orchestra, New Orleans Philharmonic Orchestra and with the Denver Symphony Orchestra as soloist in over thirty major works.

He was also concertmaster of four major ballet companies—the Pennsylvania Ballet from Philadelphia, the New York City Center Ballet, the Harkness Ballet of New York and the National Ballet of Canada in Toronto where he did all of the solo work for Rudolf Nureyev.

For many years, Jesse Ceci played in the Denver Duo with pianist Zoe Erisman, a colleague of his at the University of Colorado at Denver (UCD). The duo performed complete cycles of the Beethoven Violin and Piano Sonatas and the Beethoven Piano Trios. He also taught violin and chamber music at UCD.

== Recordings ==
Ceci recorded with all of the major symphony orchestras, and was a member of the Esterhazy Orchestra, Zimbler Sinfonietta, New York Philomusica Chamber Ensemble, Marlboro Orchestra under the direction of Pablo Casals, and the Royal Chamber Orchestra of Japan. He worked on numerous film, Broadway and television soundtracks and a myriad of recordings with artists such as Bill Jackson, Images, Bryan Savage, the Moody Blues, James Wilt, John Tesh, Newton Wayland, and The Denver Pops Orchestra.

== Humanitarian ==
Ceci also taught violin privately, often giving extra lessons and spending extra time with students at no charge. He loved coaching young people and mentored many of them, many of which now enjoy successful careers in music. Jesse was a humanitarian and gave scores of benefit performances to support and help raise awareness of various causes throughout the world including most recently the Colorado AIDS Project, and Afghan Ed, which helped return young Afghan girls to school after 10 years of oppression by the Taliban.

== Death and interment ==
Jesse Ceci died at the age of 82 of Acute Myeloid Leukemia on May 10, 2006, at the Johnson Center, a hospice located in Centennial, Colorado.
