= Cece Sagini =

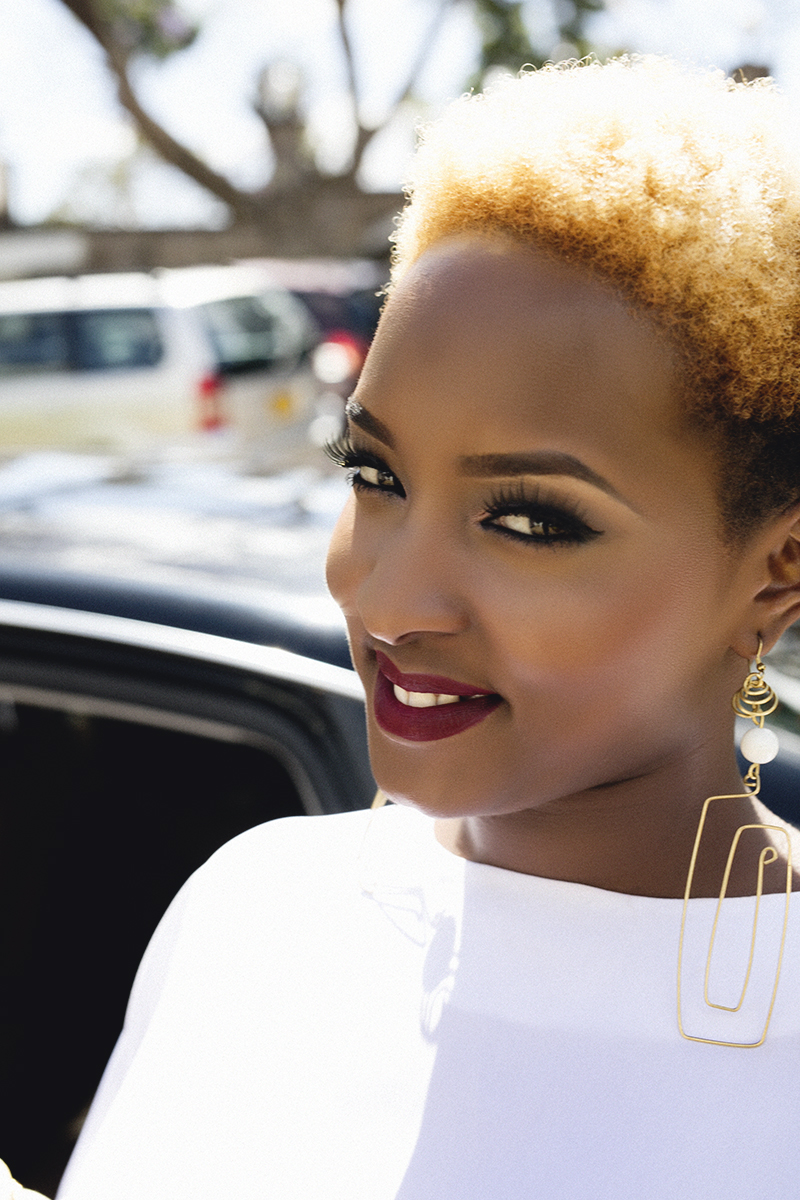
- Cece On A Mission

Background information
- Born: Cecilia Sagini Kemunto; 5 November 1991 (age 34); Nairobi, Kenya
- Genres: Urban Contemporary, Afro fusion
- Occupation(s): Singer, songwriter
- Instrument(s): Piano and guitar
- Years active: 2012 - present
- Website: cecesagini.com

Cecilia Sagini Kemunto (born 5 November 1991), better known as Cece Sagini, is an African singer and songwriter based in Nairobi, Kenya. She first came into the music scene with a collaboration with Jimmy Gait with the song Appointment. There after she has released more popular singles such as "Sio Mwisho", "Feel it", "I'm A Doer" Ft Octopizzo, "9 to 5" and a Kisii song labelled "Ensobosobo".

Her contribution to the music industry earned her one Groove Award for song of the year.

== Early life ==
Cece Sagini was born and raised in Nairobi, Kenya's capital city. She is a last born in a family of four sisters; Esther Sagini, Stella Sagini, Cynthia Sagini and herself. Growing up with a father, 'Anthony Sagini', who enjoyed music and played the guitar and her mother, 'Jane Sagini', who was a two term choir chair lady at her local church, Cece Sagini easily picked up the love of music and therefore began piano classes at the age of 11.

== Career ==
In 2012, Cece Sagini officially began her music career. She had her first break through a collaboration with a popular gospel artist called Jimmy Gait, Appointment, which was awarded 'Song of the Year' in the Groove Awards 2013. In 2013, she joined Sauti Academy, a one year music program that enabled her to better her musical skills. During this time, she met a producer MG who produced her first single Sio Mwisho which she released on 1 December 2013. She then worked with producers Big Soul and Kevin Provoke on a single titled Feel It which was released 3 June 2015. During this time she was invited to represent Kenya in a festival in Israel On coming back she collaborated with a popular Hip Hop artist Octopizzo on a hit song titled 'I'm A Doer' which was released on 9 November 2015. On gaining popularity, with her music playing on MTV and Trace, Sagini went on to release her fourth single '9 to 5' on 23 February 2016. Cece Sagini then displayed the Kisii culture in her single titled "Ensobosobo" (In English; Peruvian ground Cherry) which she co-wrote with her mother 'Jane Sagini' and released on 20 July 2016.

== Discography ==
Year	Title	Ref
2012	Appointment Ft Jimmy Gait	
2013	Sio Mwisho	
2015	Feel It	
2015	I'm A Doer Ft Octopizzo	
2016	9 To 5	
2016	Ensobosobo	
2017	Come Down	
