= Çiçi =

- Municipality
- Location within Azerbaijan
- Coordinates: 41°12′33″N 48°40′27″E
- Country: Azerbaijan
- Rayon: Quba

Population
  - Total: 1,131
- Time zone: UTC+4 (AZT)
  - Summer (DST): UTC+5 (AZT)

Çiçi (also, Chichi, Dare-Chichi, and Dera-Chichi) is a village and municipality in the Quba Rayon of Azerbaijan. It has a population of 1,131. The municipality consists of the villages of Çiçi, Qənidərə, and Raziyələr.

The population of Chichi consists of Tats. According to the 2009 census, 814 people live in the village.
