= Senova D60 =

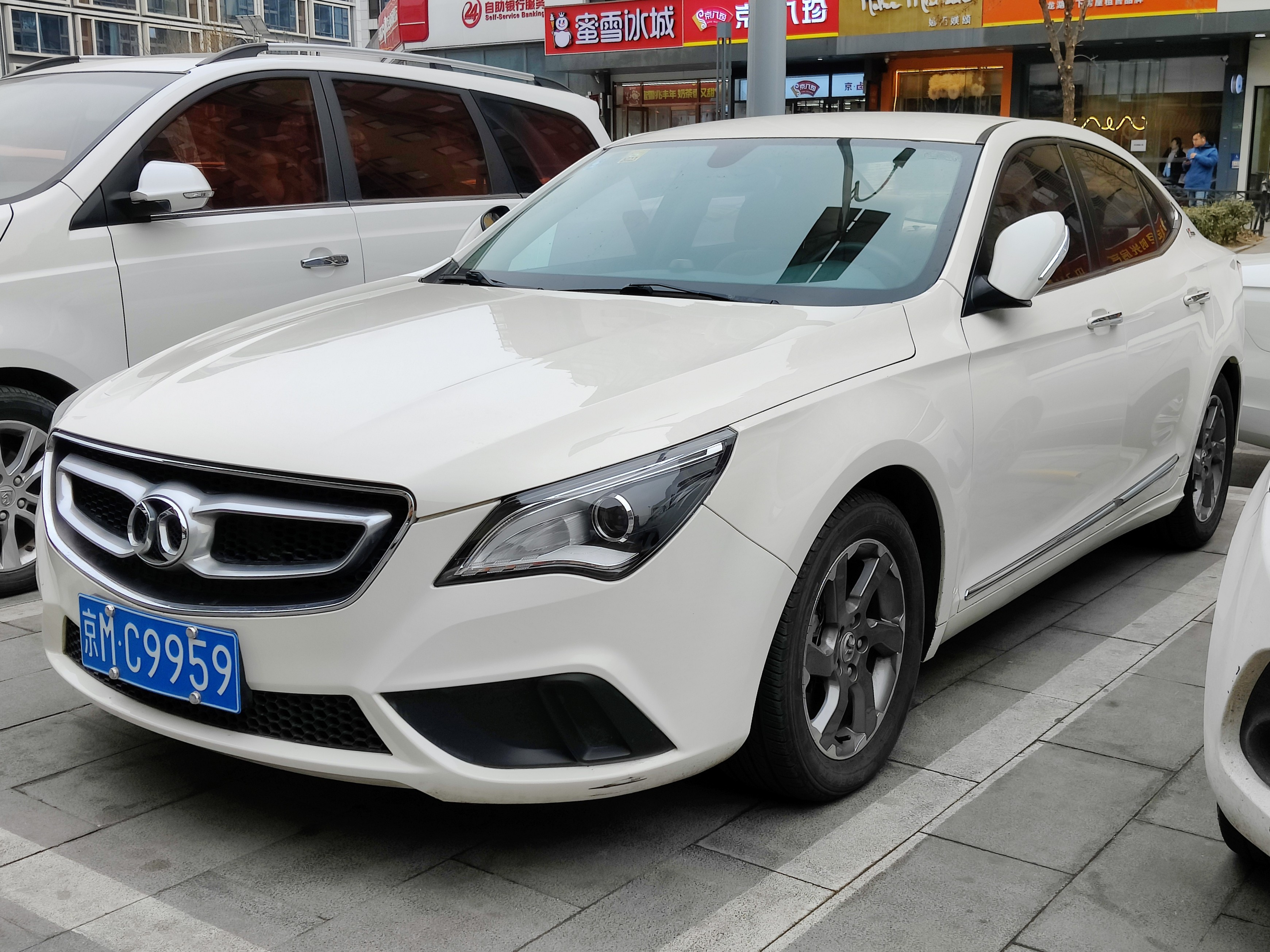

Overview
- Also called: Senova CC
- Production: 2014–2017
- Model years: 2015–2017
- Designer: Mike Robinson

Body and chassis
- Class: Mid-size car
- Body style: 4-door sedan

Powertrain
- Engine: 1.8 L B185R I4 (turbo petrol); 2.0 L B205 I4 (turbo petrol)
- Transmission: 5-speed manual 5-speed automatic

Dimensions
- Wheelbase: 2,675 mm (105.3 in)
- Length: 4,670–4,735 mm (183.9–186.4 in)
- Width: 1,790 mm (70.5 in)
- Height: 1,450 mm (57.1 in)
- Curb weight: 1,450–1,545 kg (3,197–3,406 lb)

The Senova D60 is a mid-size sedan produced by the Chinese car manufacturer BAIC Motor under the Senova brand.

== Overview ==
The final production version of the Senova D60 debuted in August 2014 on the 2014 Chengdu Auto Show. The Senova D60 is based on the same platform as the second-generation Saab 9-3. Beijing Auto bought the license to the Saab 9-3 models and Saab 9-5 models from GM in 2009. The deal included the Saab-developed 2.0 liter turbocharged four-cylinder petrol engine and the 2.3 liter turbo four-cylinder petrol engine. At launch, the Senova D60 is only offered with the inline-four 1.8 liter turbo petrol engine producing 132 kW (177 hp) and 240 N⋅m (177 lb⋅ft) mated to a 5-speed manual gearbox or a 5-speed automatic gearbox, with the Saab-based 2.0 liter turbo engine reserved only for the CC models. With a planned annual production of 300,000 units, the production of the new model began in September 2014.

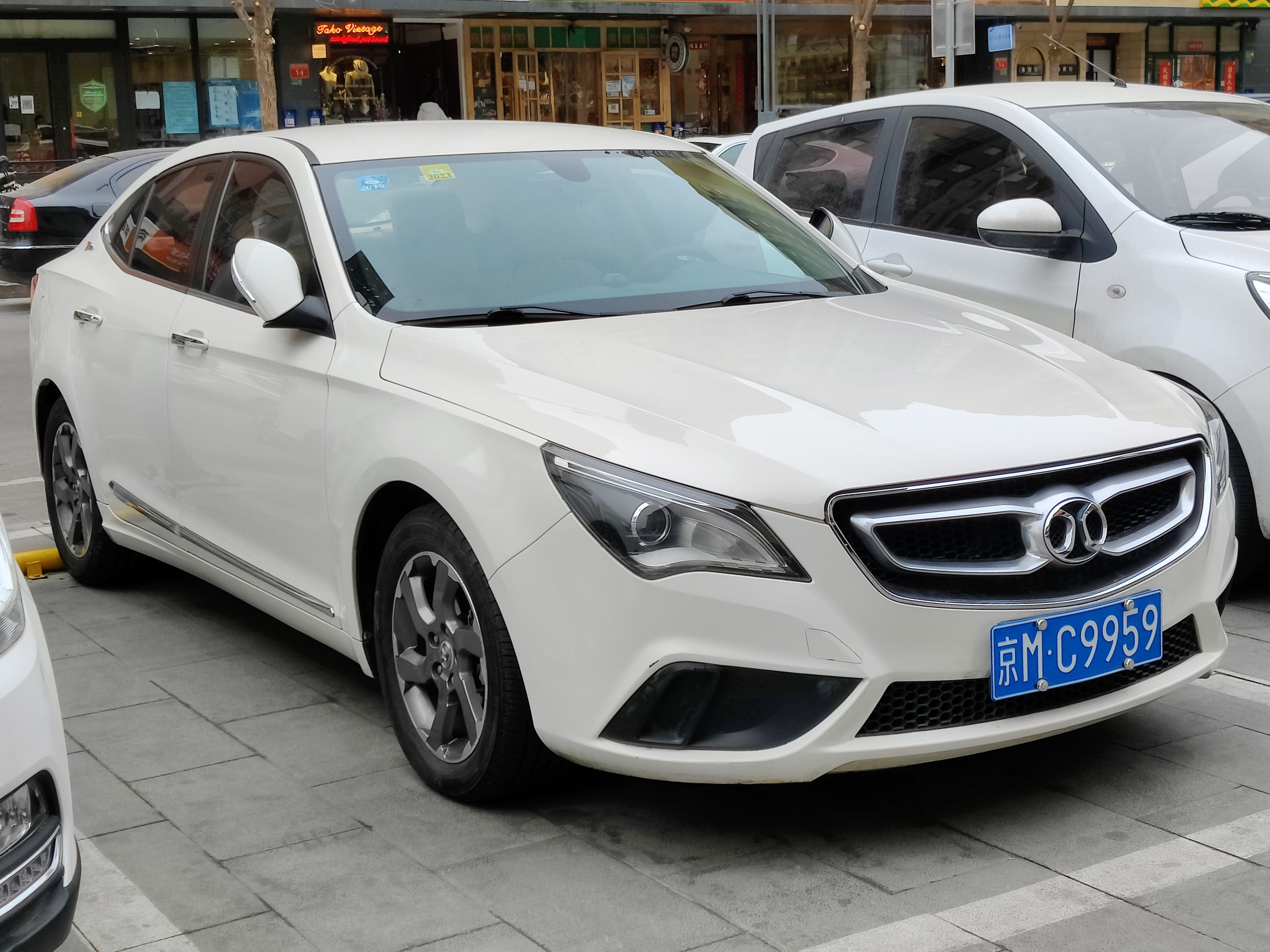
Senova D60 front

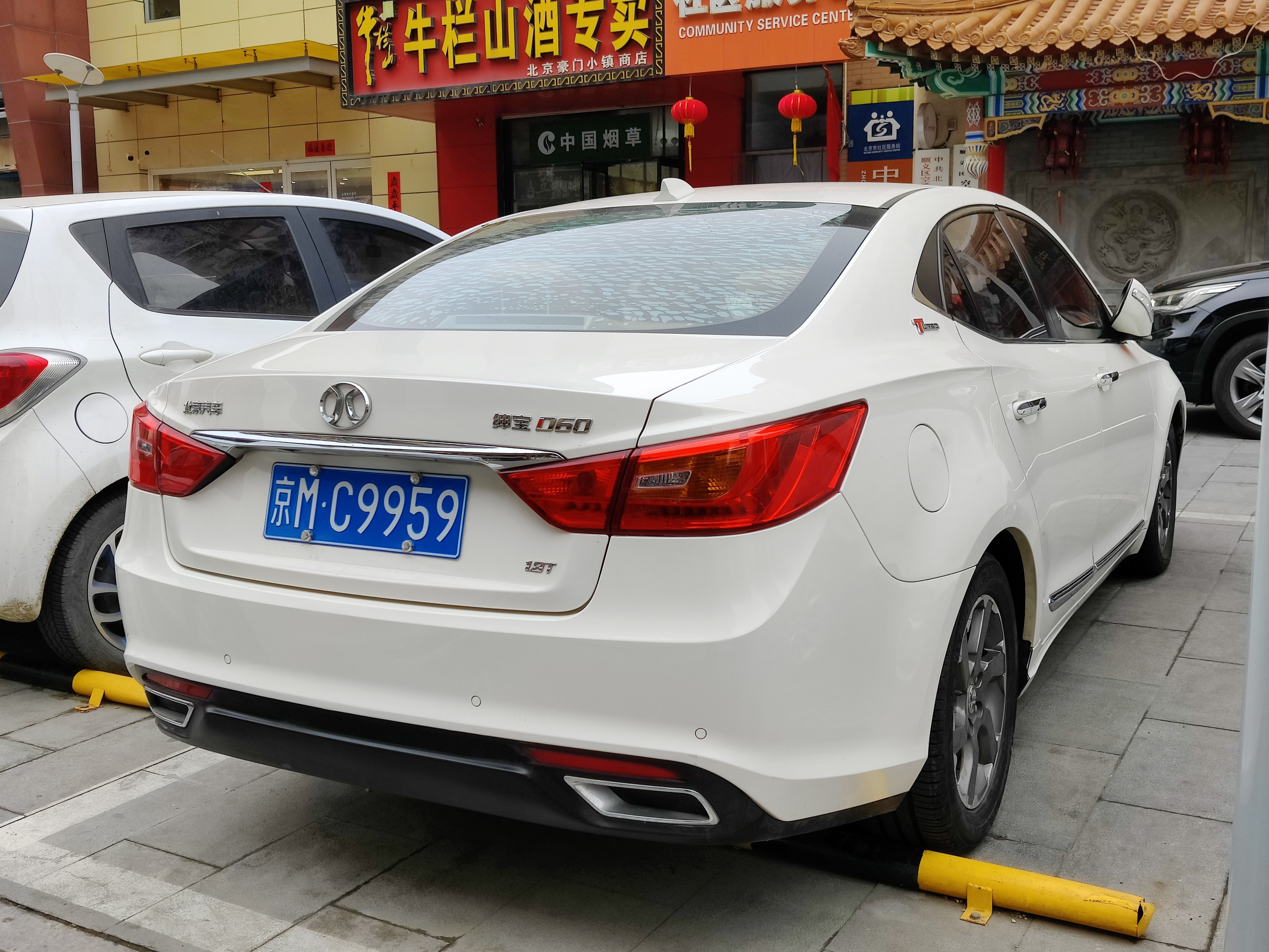
Senova D60 rear

=== Senova CC ===
A sportier variant of the D60 called the Senova CC was also available. The Beijing Auto Senova CC sedan debuted during the 2014 Guangzhou Auto Show in China, and was launched in China in April 2015. The Senova CC is powered by the inline-four 1.8 liter turbocharged petrol engine producing 132 kW (177 hp) and 240 N⋅m (177 lb⋅ft) also offered on the D60 and the Saab-based 2.0 liter turbo engine producing 152 kW (204 hp) and 270 N⋅m (199 lb⋅ft) of torque mated to a 5-speed manual gearbox or a 5-speed automatic gearbox. Production for the CC started in 2015 and ended in 2017.

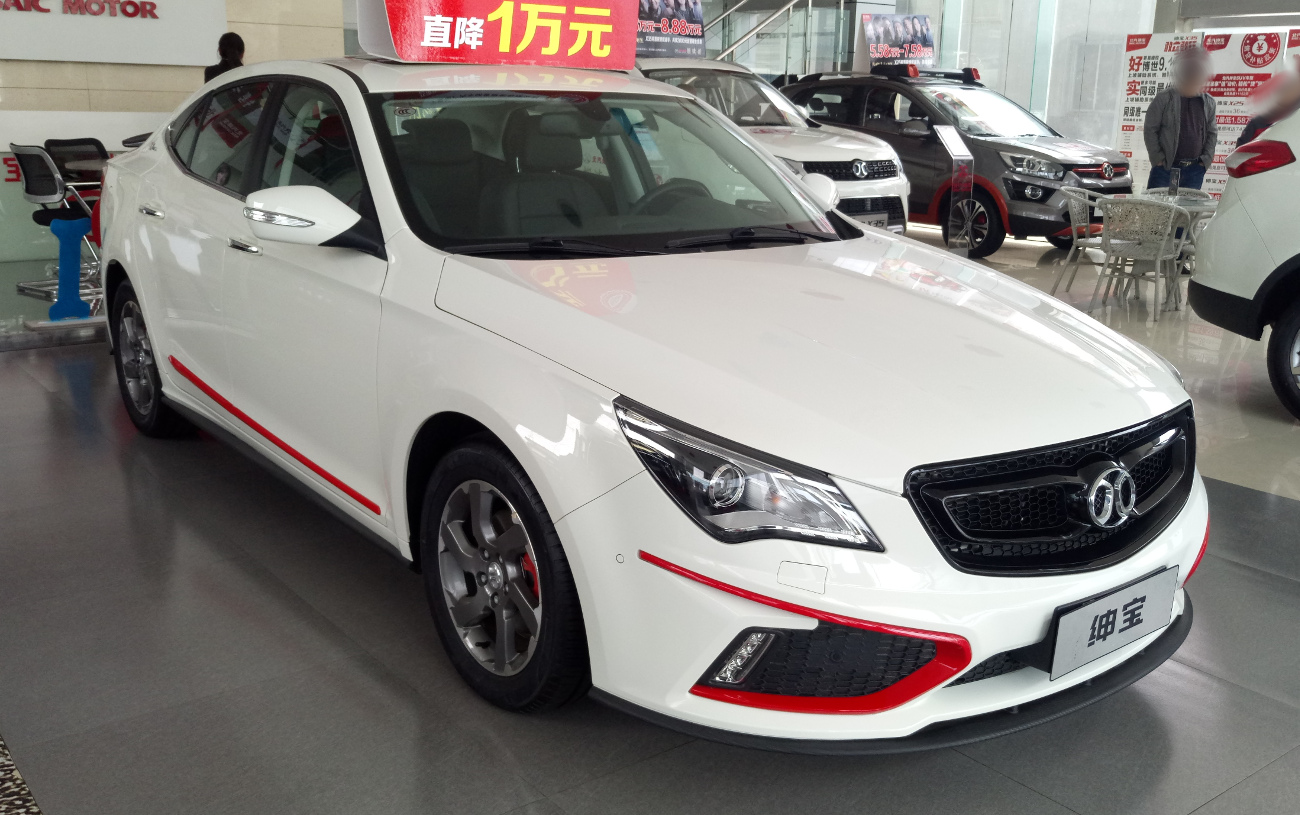
Senova CC front

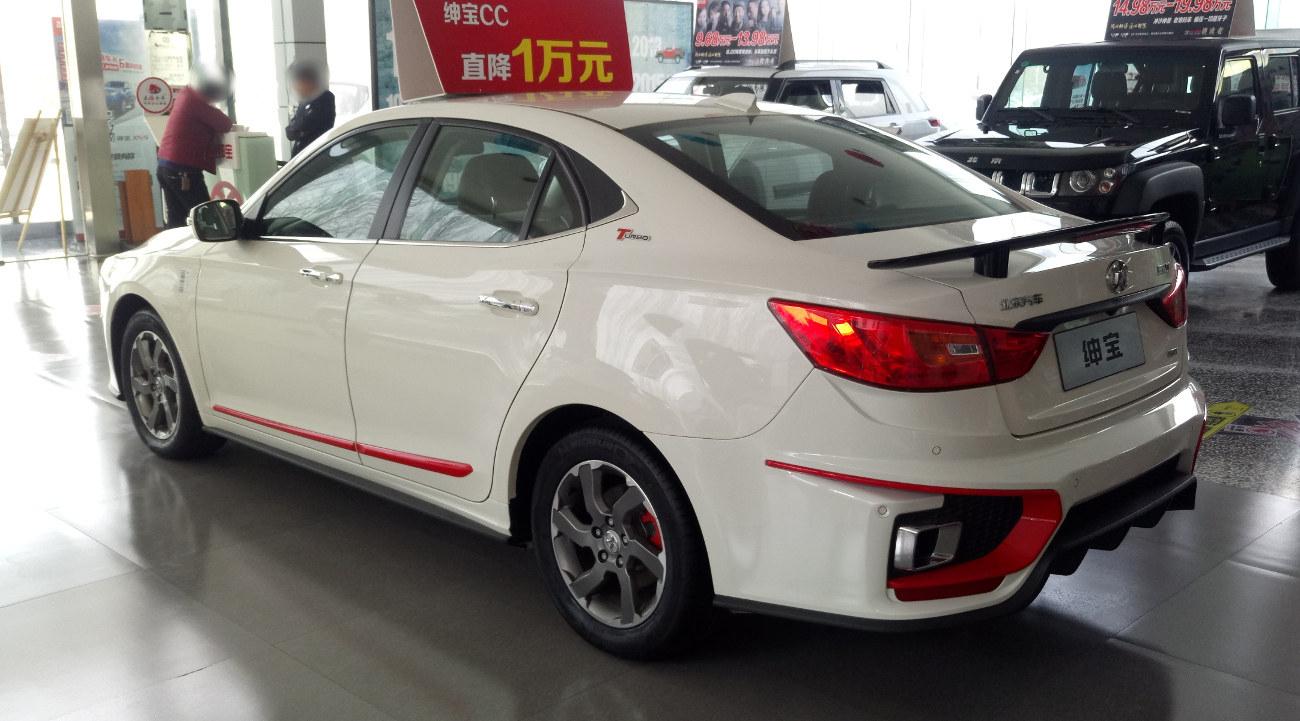
Senova CC rear
