= Arcfox Kaola =

Battery electric minivan

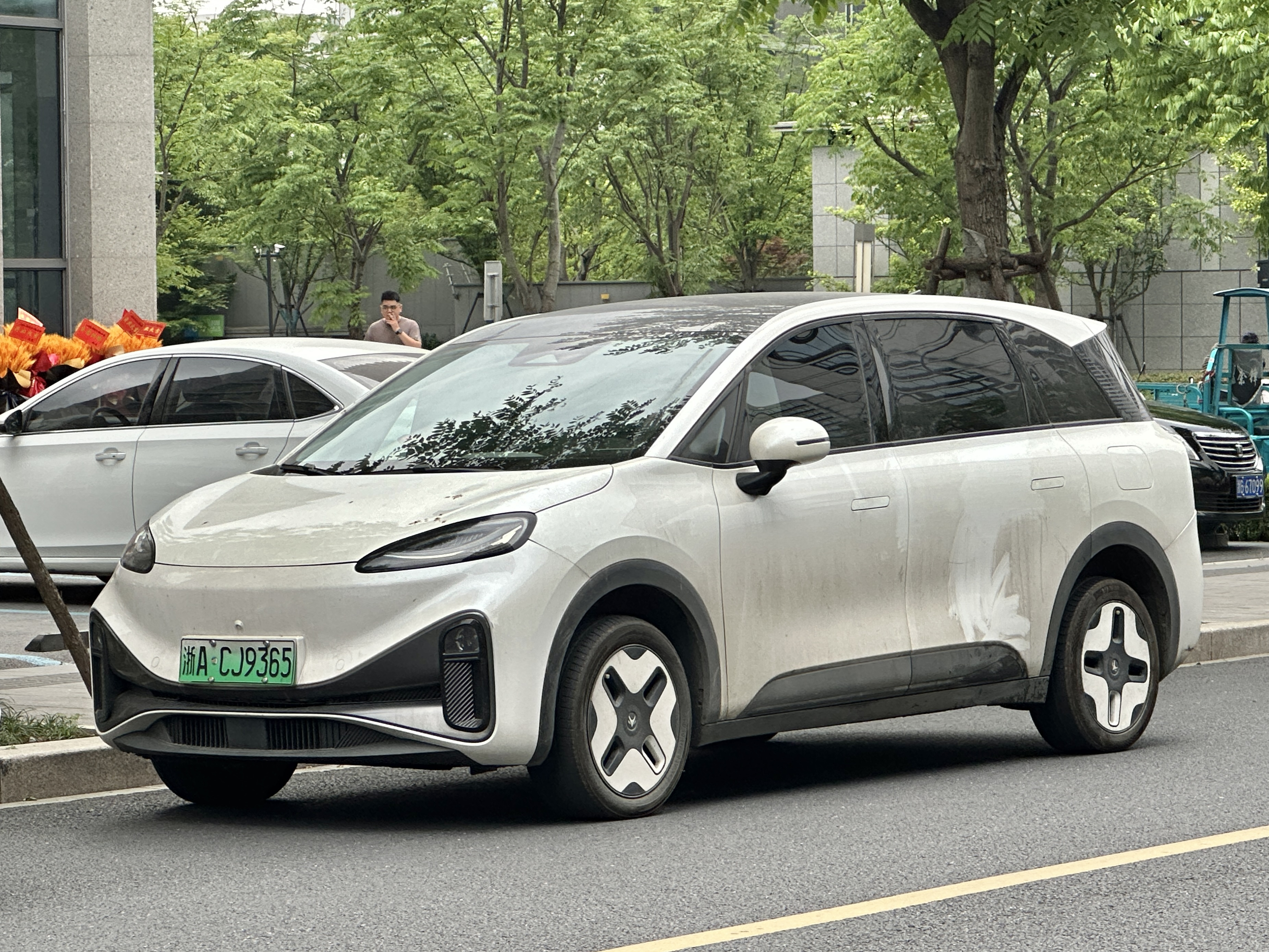

Overview
- Manufacturer: Arcfox (BAIC Group)
- Production: 2023–present
- Assembly: China: Zhenjiang
- Designer: Walter de Silva

Body and chassis
- Class: Minivan (M)
- Body style: 5-door minivan
- Layout: Front-engine, front-wheel-drive

Powertrain
- Electric motor: Permanent magnet synchronous
- Power output: 161 hp (120 kW; 163 PS)
- Battery: 58.86 kWh LFP CATL
- Electric range: 500 km (311 mi) (CLTC)

Dimensions
- Wheelbase: 2,820 mm (111 in)
- Length: 4,500 mm (180 in)
- Width: 1,870 mm (74 in)
- Height: 1,655 mm (65.2 in)
- Curb weight: 1,800 kg (3,968 lb)

The Arcfox Kaola (Chinese: 极狐考拉) is a battery electric minivan produced by the BAIC Group under the brand name Arcfox. According to Arcfox, the Kaola is designed for mothers with babies.

== Overview ==
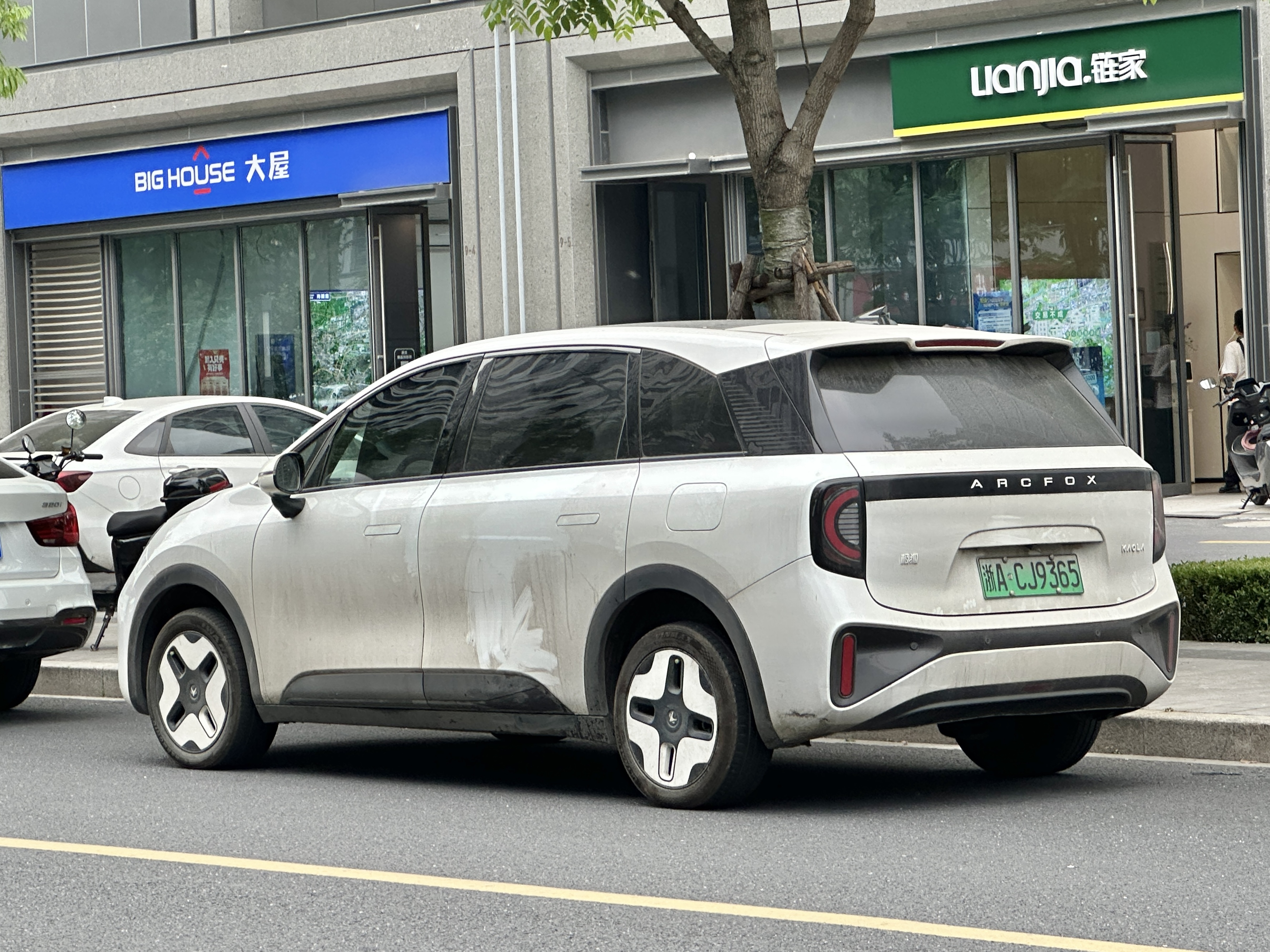
Rear view

The Kaola was first shown in January 2023. The Kaola is a 4-seater MPV, and it has a front motor producing 163 hp (122 kW; 165 PS) as standard and a top speed limited to 160 km/h. The battery is a 58.86 kWh LFP battery made by CATL and a CLTC range of 500 kilometres (310 mi).

Just like the BYD D1 and Bestune NAT, the Kaola features a sliding door on the right side to prevent passengers from opening the door and potentially hitting cyclists or pedestrians.

== Arcfox Kaola S ==
A 5-seater variant called the Kaola S was launched on August 7, 2024. Despite having absolutely no difference from the original Kaola in terms of styling, specifications, and dimensions, the Kaola S was claimed to be positioned as a compact crossover SUV.

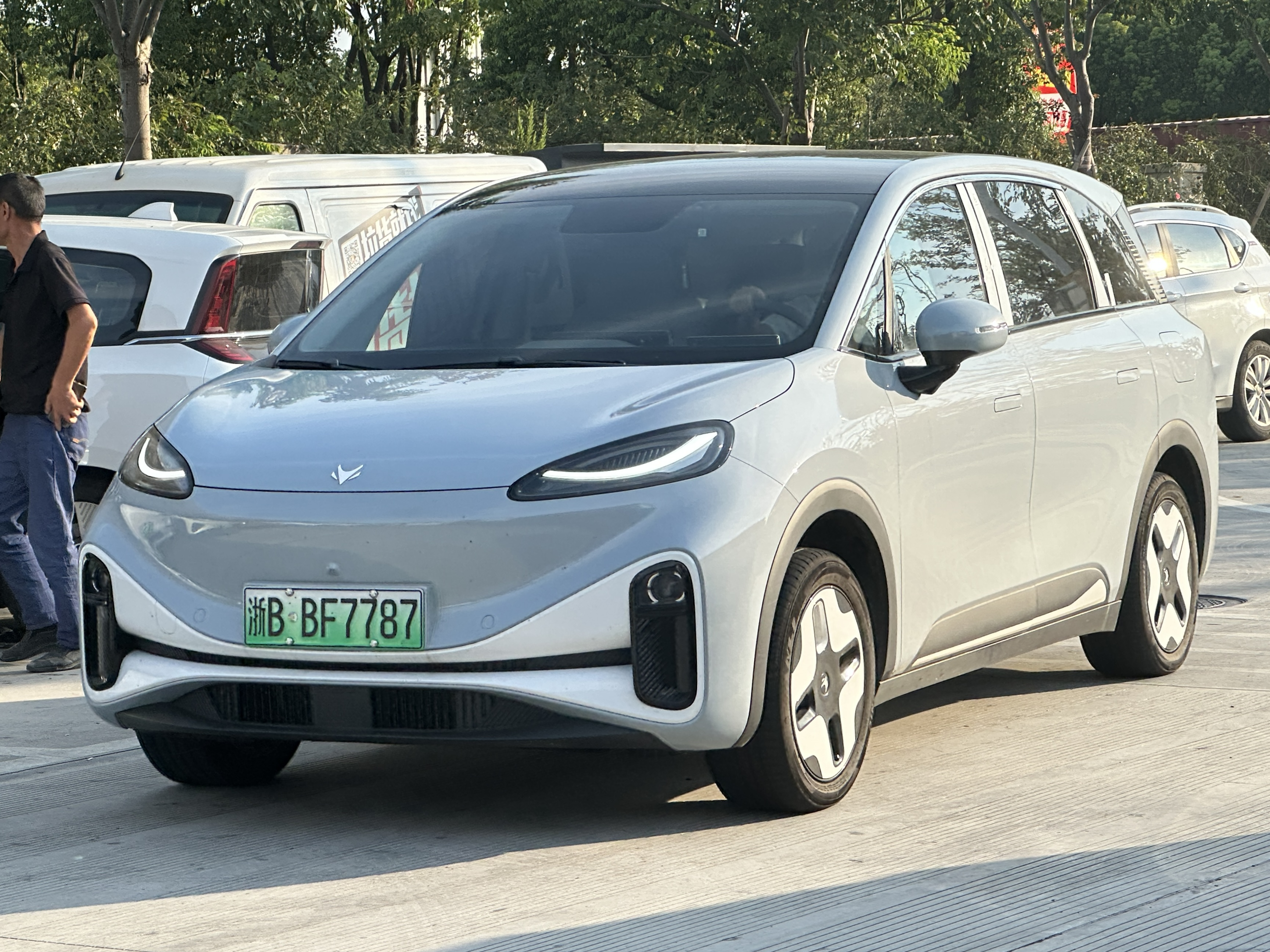
Arcfox Kaola S

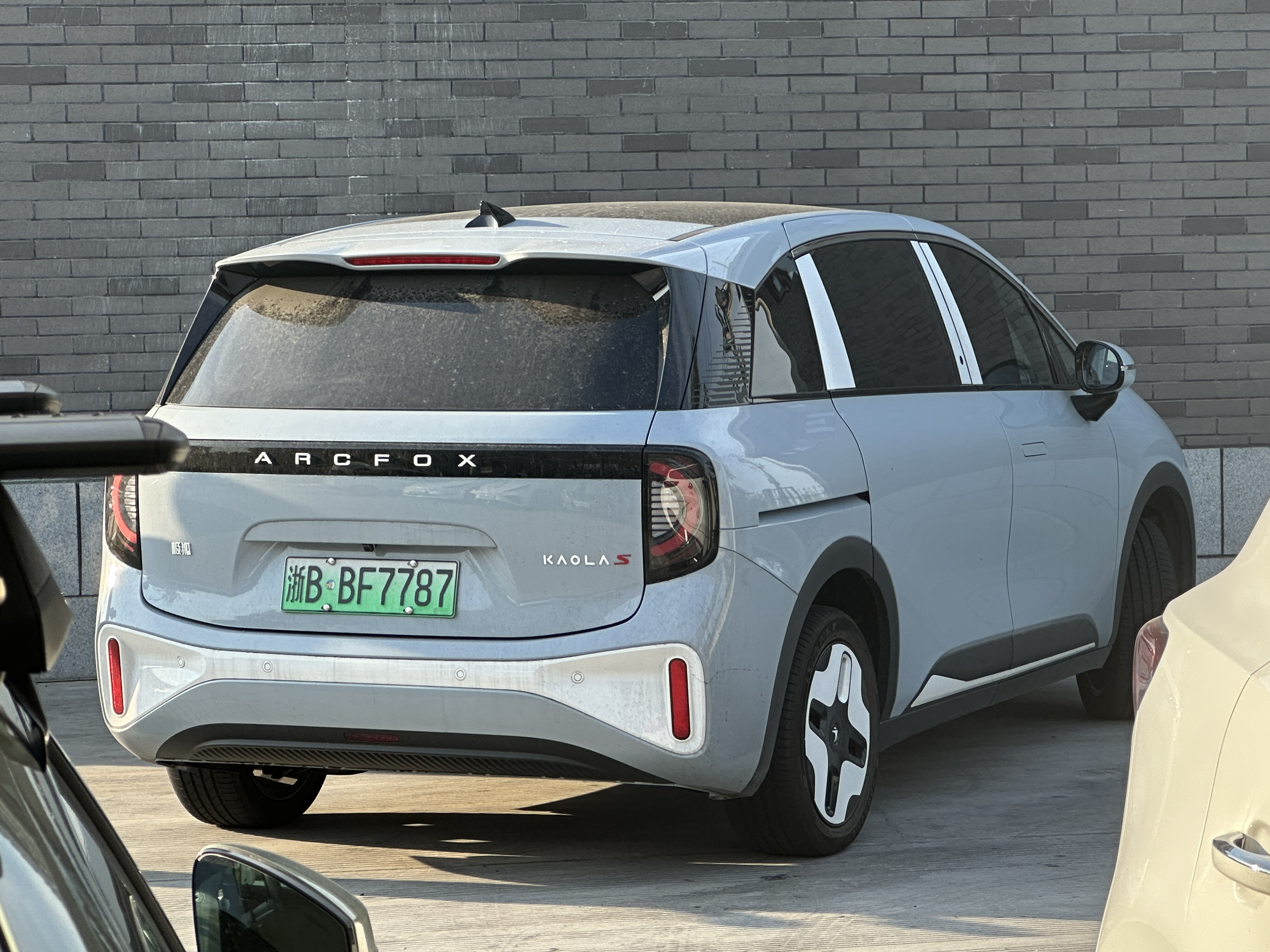
Rear view

== Sales ==
| Year | China |
|---|---|
| 2023 | 7,286 |
| 2024 | 19,289 |
| 2025 | 22,821 |
