= BYD D1 =

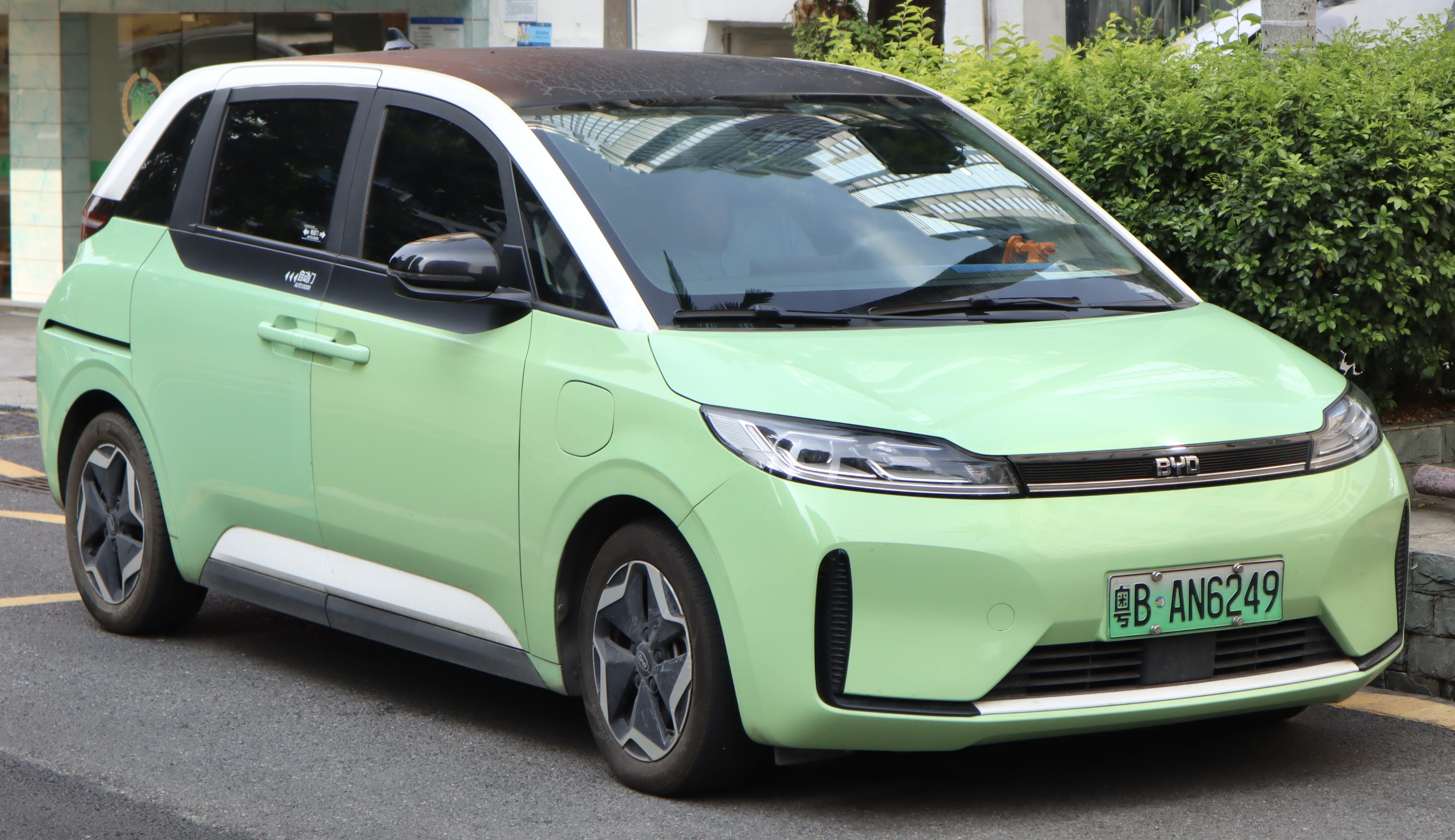
- BYD D1 in Shenzhen

Overview
- Manufacturer: BYD
- Production: 2020–2023
- Assembly: China: Changsha

Body and chassis
- Class: Mini MPV
- Body style: 5-door hatchback
- Layout: Front-engine, front-wheel-drive layout
- Doors: Conventional doors (driver side and passenger side front door)/Sliding Doors (passenger side rear)

Powertrain
- Electric motor: 100 kW (134 hp; 136 PS)
- Hybrid drivetrain: Battery electric vehicle
- Battery: 70 kWh
- Electric range: 305 kilometres (190 mi)
- Plug-in charging: 22 kW AC; 50 kW DC

Dimensions
- Wheelbase: 2,800 mm (110.2 in)
- Length: 4,390 mm (172.8 in)
- Width: 1,850 mm (72.8 in)
- Height: 1,650 mm (65.0 in)
- Kerb weight: 1,640–2,015 kg (3,616–4,442 lb)

The BYD D1 is a purpose-built electric compact multi purpose vehicle (MPV) developed by BYD in cooperation with DiDi exclusively developed for ride-hailing services.

== History ==
As of 2018, Didi formed an alliance with automakers including Volkswagen, BAIC, and BYD to develop purpose-built intelligent vehicles for ride-hailing and fleet management. The alliance starts with DiDi offering its customer base and operational skills to automakers wanting to develop their own ride-hailing services as research database in return for design expertise. The D1 model is the first purpose-built model DiDi has unveiled for ride-hailing services that came out of the alliance with automakers.

As of August 2020, Government documents show that BYD received approval from the Ministry of Industry and Information Technology of China to sell an electric vehicle developed with DiDi called the D1.

On November 16, 2020, the BYD D1 was revealed in Beijing. The firm announced that the vehicle would start to join the ride hailing service as part of the test run in December in Changsha. Sales were limited to drivers registered on the ride hailing platform at launch. According to officials, the D1 name means "Always Day 1". In April 2022, the first major foreign company, Mexican Vemo, placed a large order for a fleet of 1,000 BYD E1s.

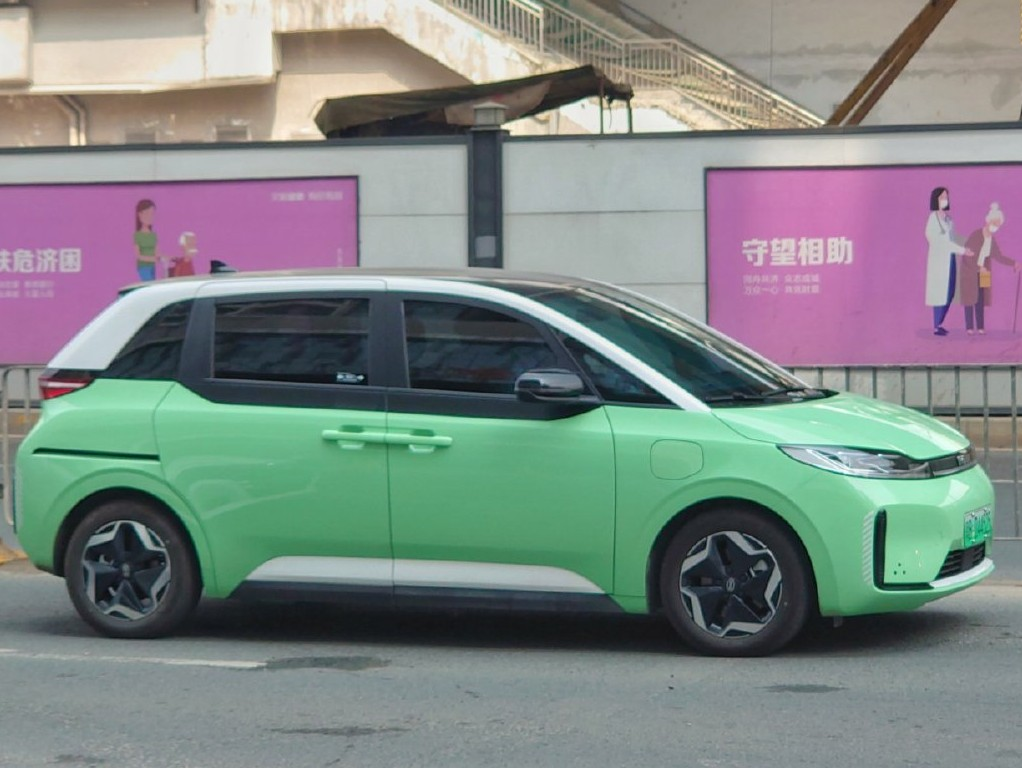
BYD D1 passenger side with the sliding rear door

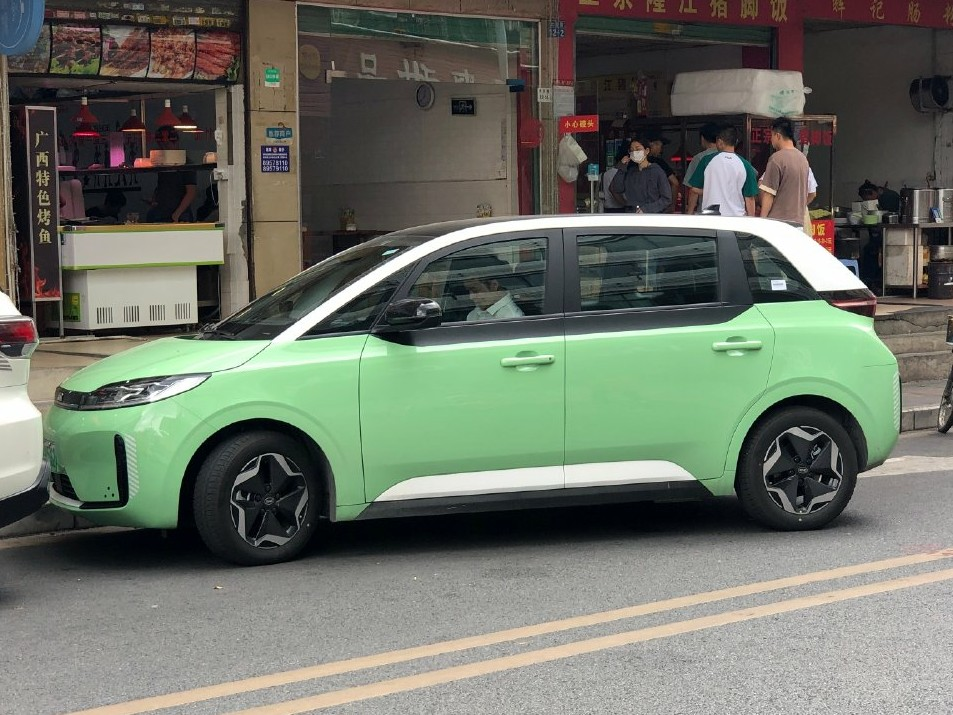
BYD D1 driver side with the hinged rear door

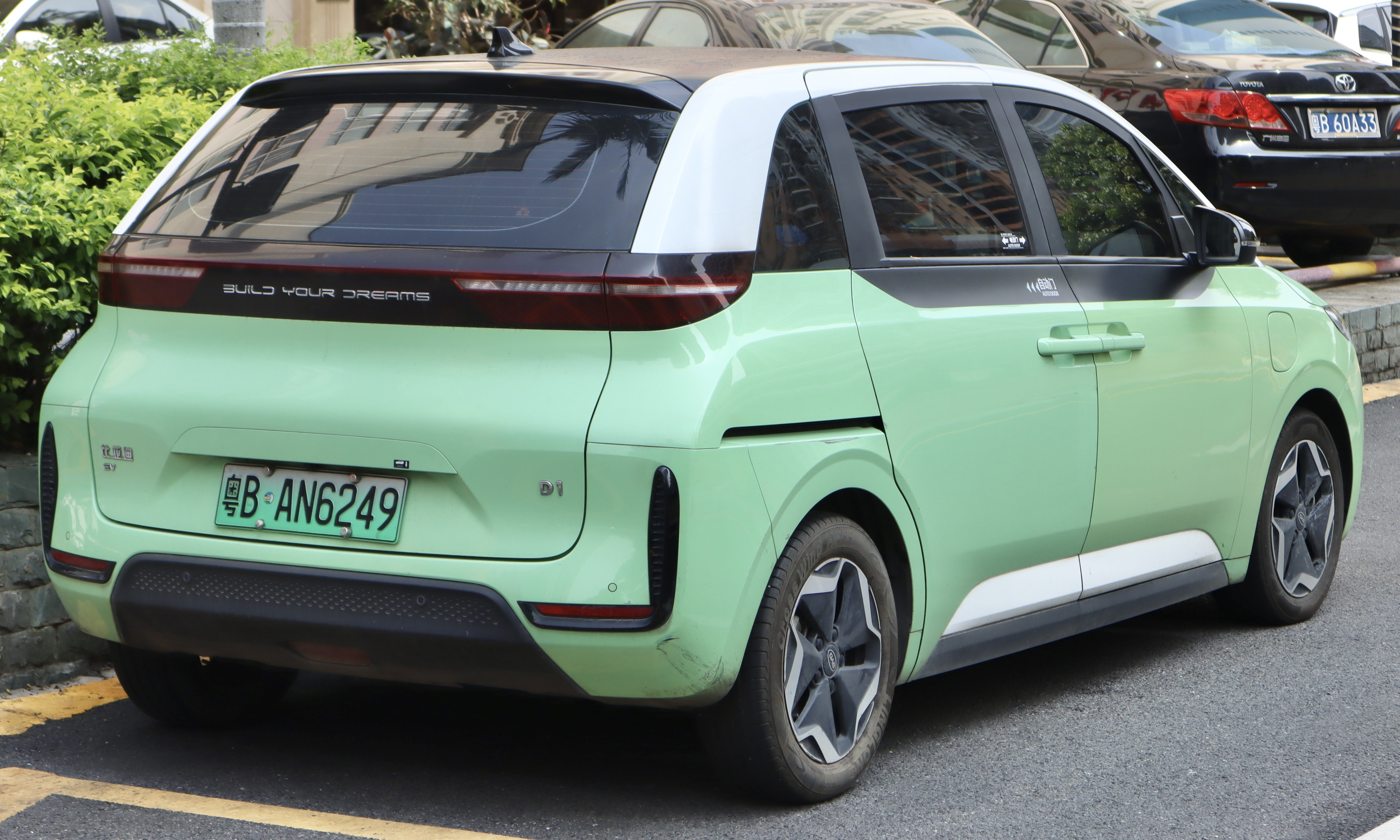
BYD D1 rear quarter

== Specifications ==
The D1 compact MPV is powered by one TZ180XSA electric motor with a capacity of 100 kW (134 hp; 136 PS) and is equipped with a 70 kWh (250 MJ) cobalt-free LFP battery. The maximum speed is 130 km/h (81 mph).

The D1 features a sliding door on the right side to free passengers from opening the door and potentially hitting cyclists or pedestrians. The vehicles also has larger legroom for back seat passengers.

== Sales ==
Didi plans to put 10,000 D1 units in service from October 2020 to December 2020, and 100,000 units in 2021. As the first model to have been built with ride-hailing in mind, DiDi plans to ship D1 vehicles to leasing partners across several Chinese cities.

== See also ==
- Bestune NAT
- Arcfox Kaola
