= Tazzari Zero =

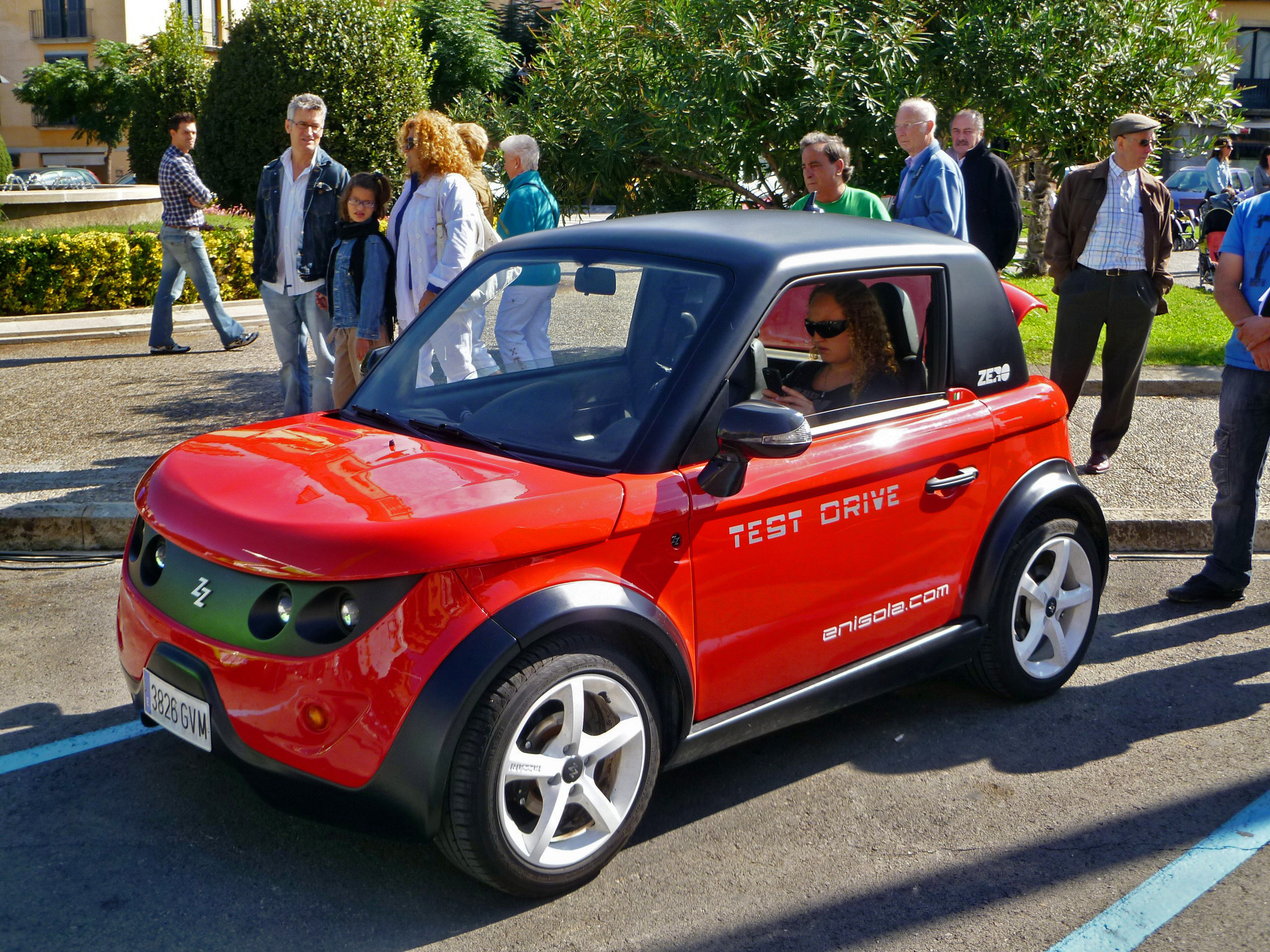

Overview
- Manufacturer: Tazzari Group
- Production: 2009–2022
- Assembly: Imola, Italy

Body and chassis
- Class: City battery electric car (BEV), Zero-emissions vehicle (ZEV)
- Body style: 2-door hatchback
- Layout: RR layout
- Related: Arcfox Lite

Powertrain
- Electric motor: 15 kW electric 3-phase asynch. motor
- Range: 140 km (87 mi)

Dimensions
- Length: 2,880 mm (113.4 in)
- Width: 1,560 mm (61.4 in)
- Height: 1,425 mm (56.1 in)
- Curb weight: 542 kg (1,194.9 lb)

Chronology
- Successor: Tazzari EM1

The Tazzari Zero is a battery electric microcar concept car built by the Tazzari Group, in Imola, Italy, and unveiled in the 2009 Bologna Motor Show. The Tazzari Zero uses a lithium-ion battery pack that delivers an all-electric range of 140 km (87 mi).

== Specifications ==
The Tazzari Zero has rear-wheel drive and the motor is situated above the rear axles. The car's lithium iron phosphate battery pack charge time is nine hours (standard charge) and the motor can accelerate the car to top speed of 103 km/h (64 mph). Its range is 140 km (87 mi) in Eco mode (Green) and the motor has maximum peak torque of 150 N⋅m (111 lbf⋅ft). It is also possible to charge batteries to 80% in 50 minutes using three-phase power supply (380 V Superfast charger).

The aluminum-bodied car weighs only 542 kg (1,195 lb) with batteries. The car has normal options like: central locking, electric windows and mirrors, CD/MP3-player and 15-inch alloy wheels.

== Price ==
Base price was planned in 2009 to start at €20,300 plus VAT in the European market. In the UK it was to be priced at £18,000. In the US, where it is considered a neighborhood electric vehicle, the Tazzari Zero was projected to be sold for US$29,900 and due to its battery size it will be eligible for a US$6,336 federal tax credit.

== Gallery ==
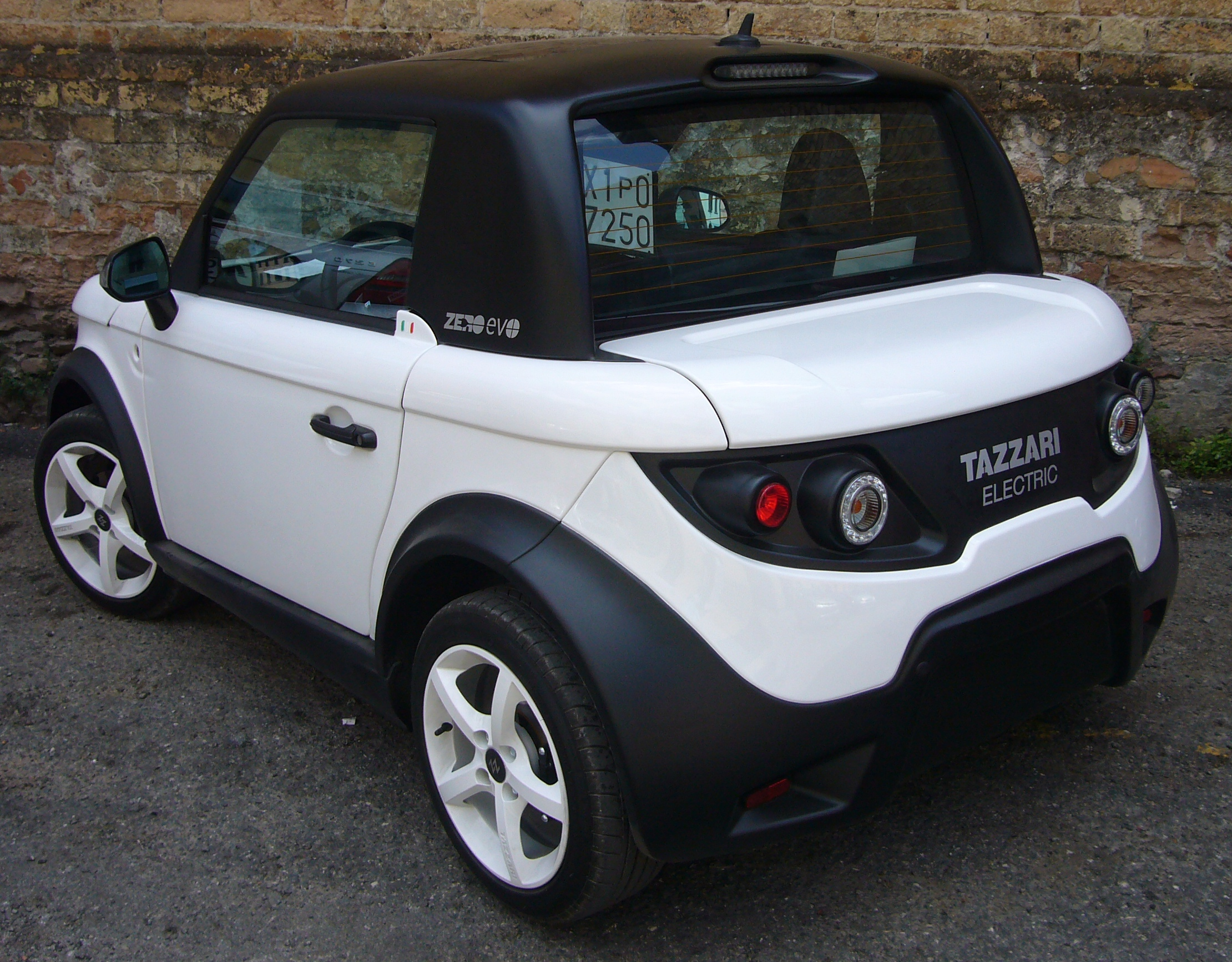
Rear view of the Tazzari Zero

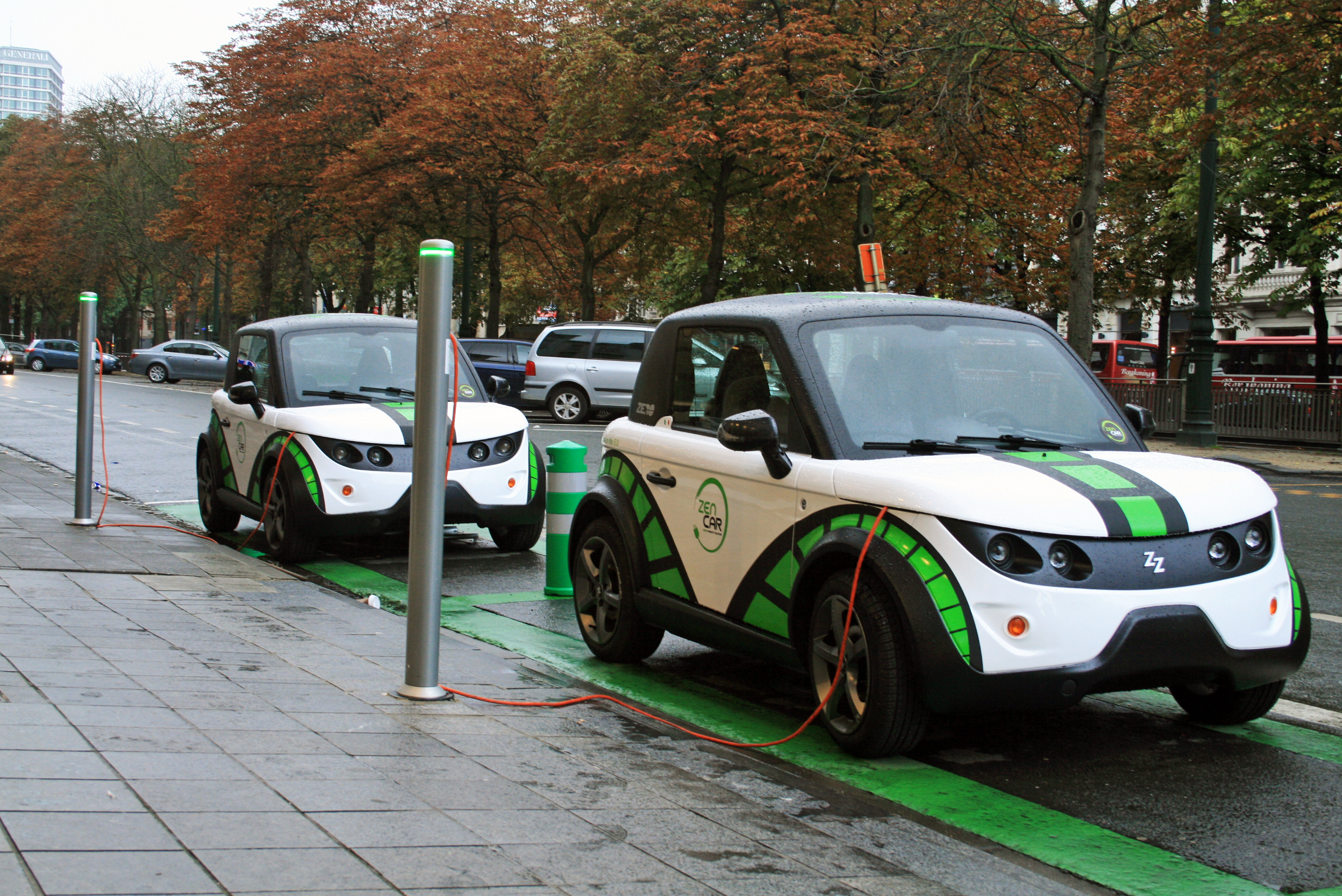
Two Tazzari Zeros charging at Avenue Louise, Brussels, Belgium

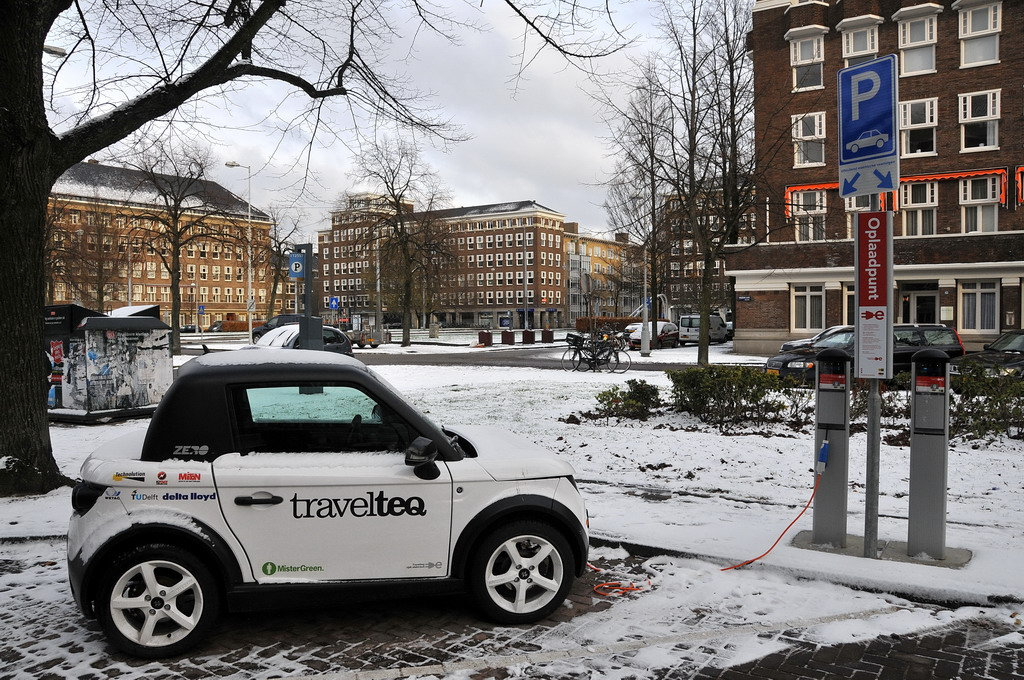
Tazzari Zero charging in Amsterdam

== Safety ==
The Zero in its standard European market configuration received 1 star in the Euro NCAP Quadricycle Ratings in 2014.

== See also ==
- Electric car use by country
- Government incentives for plug-in electric vehicles
- List of modern production plug-in electric vehicles
- List of production battery electric vehicles
- Plug-in electric vehicle
- Renault Zoe
