= Arcfox GT =

Battery electric sports car

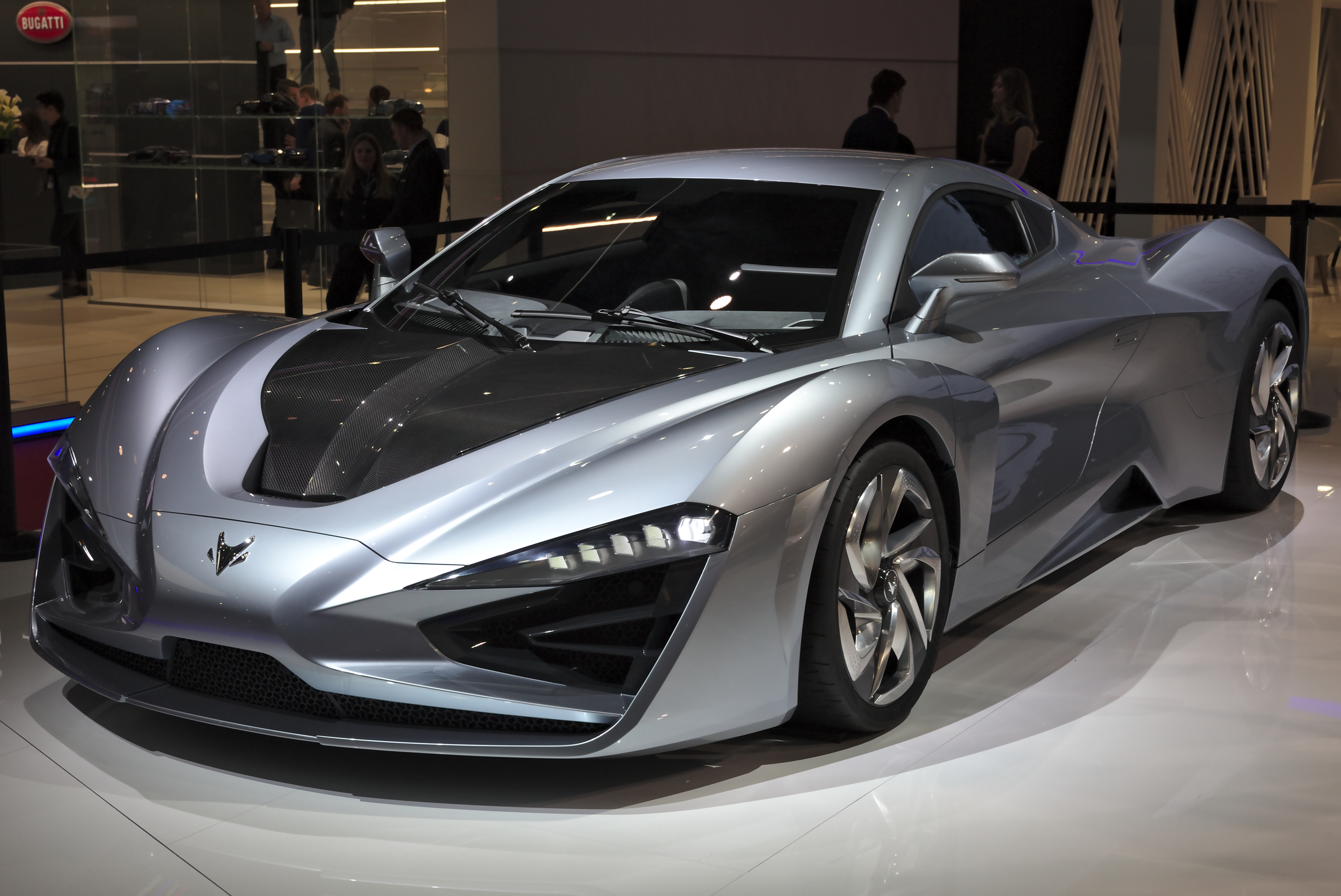

Overview
- Manufacturer: Arcfox (BAIC Group)
- Production: 2020
- Assembly: China: Zhenjiang

Body and chassis
- Class: Sports car (S)
- Body style: 2-door coupé

Dimensions
- Wheelbase: 2,800 mm (110.2 in)
- Length: 4,762 mm (187.5 in)
- Width: 2,018 mm (79.4 in)
- Height: 1,236 mm (48.7 in)
- Curb weight: 1,840 kg (4,057 lb)

The Arcfox GT is a battery electric sports car produced under the Chinese brand Arcfox in 2020.

== History and specifications ==
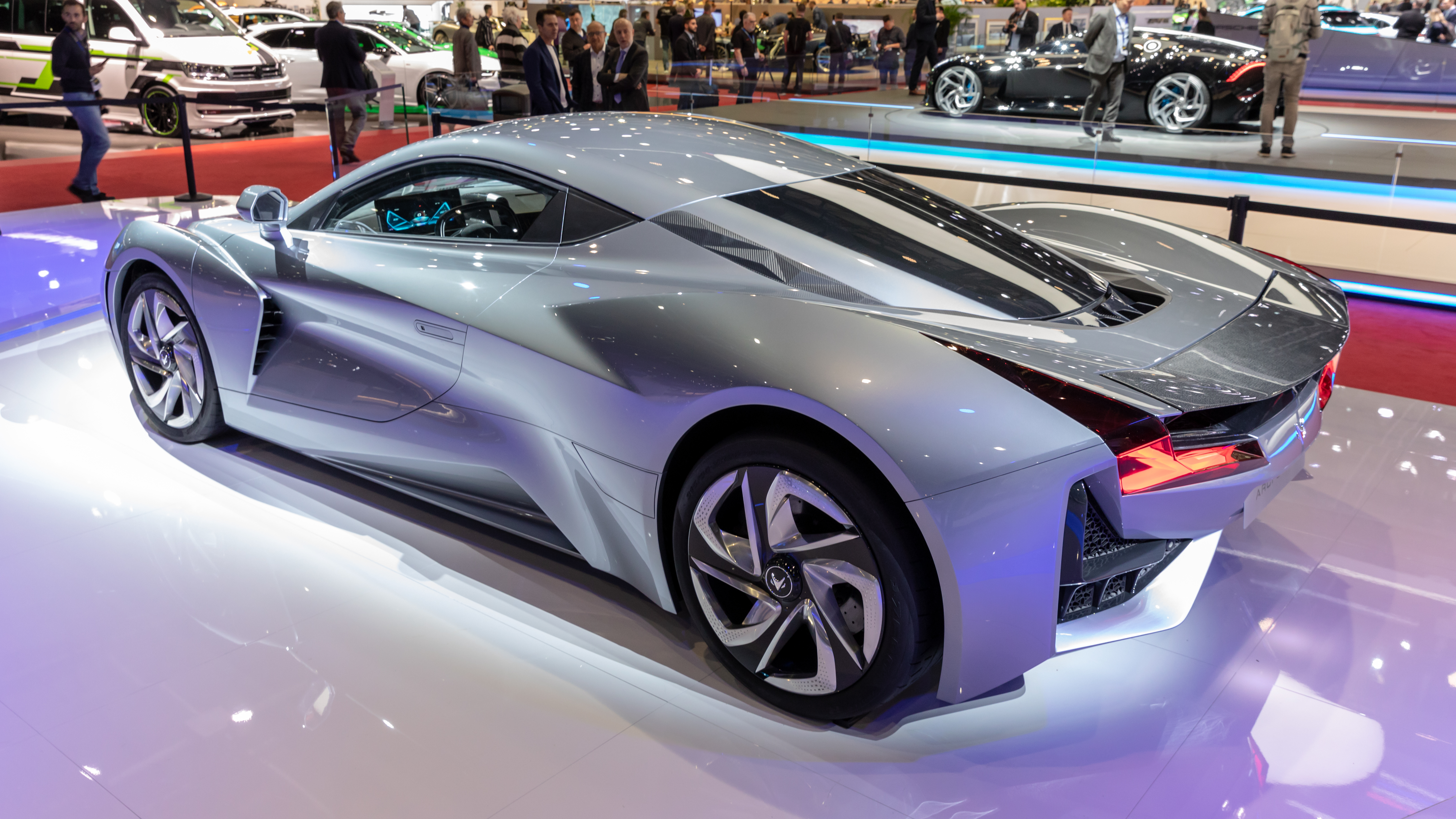
Rear view

During the Geneva Motor Show in March 2019, alongside a prototype of a large SUV called the ECF, Arcfox presented an electric sports car called the GT. The car featured aggressive styling, typical of this class of vehicles, with narrow headlights and widely spaced air intakes at the front, as well as a gently sloping roofline.

== Race Edition ==
In addition to the basic Street Edition, Arcfox also introduced a performance version called the Race Edition. Visually, it is distinguished by a different body paint and characteristic double stripes on the body, as well as a drivetrain with less power but more torque.

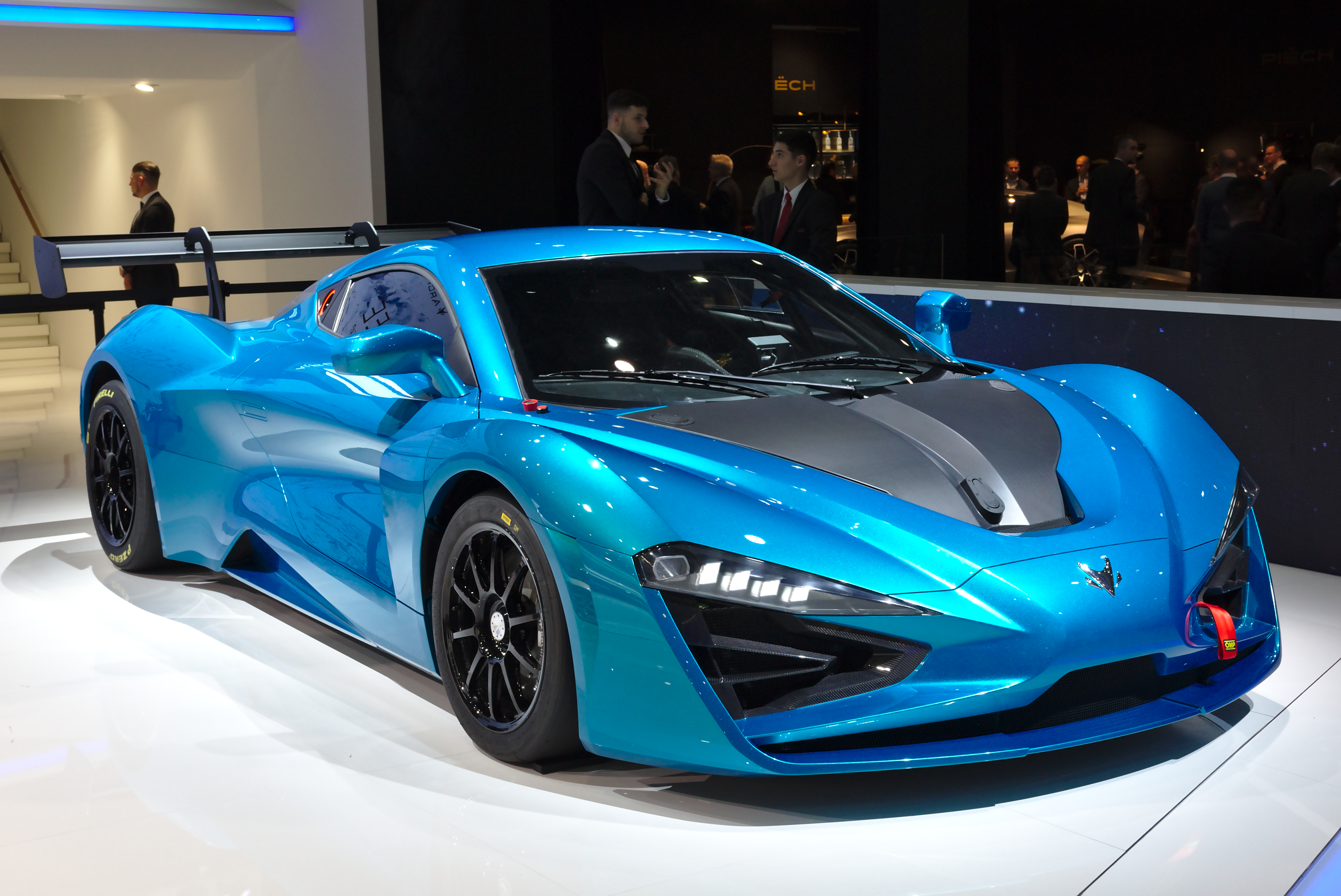
Arcfox GT Race Edition

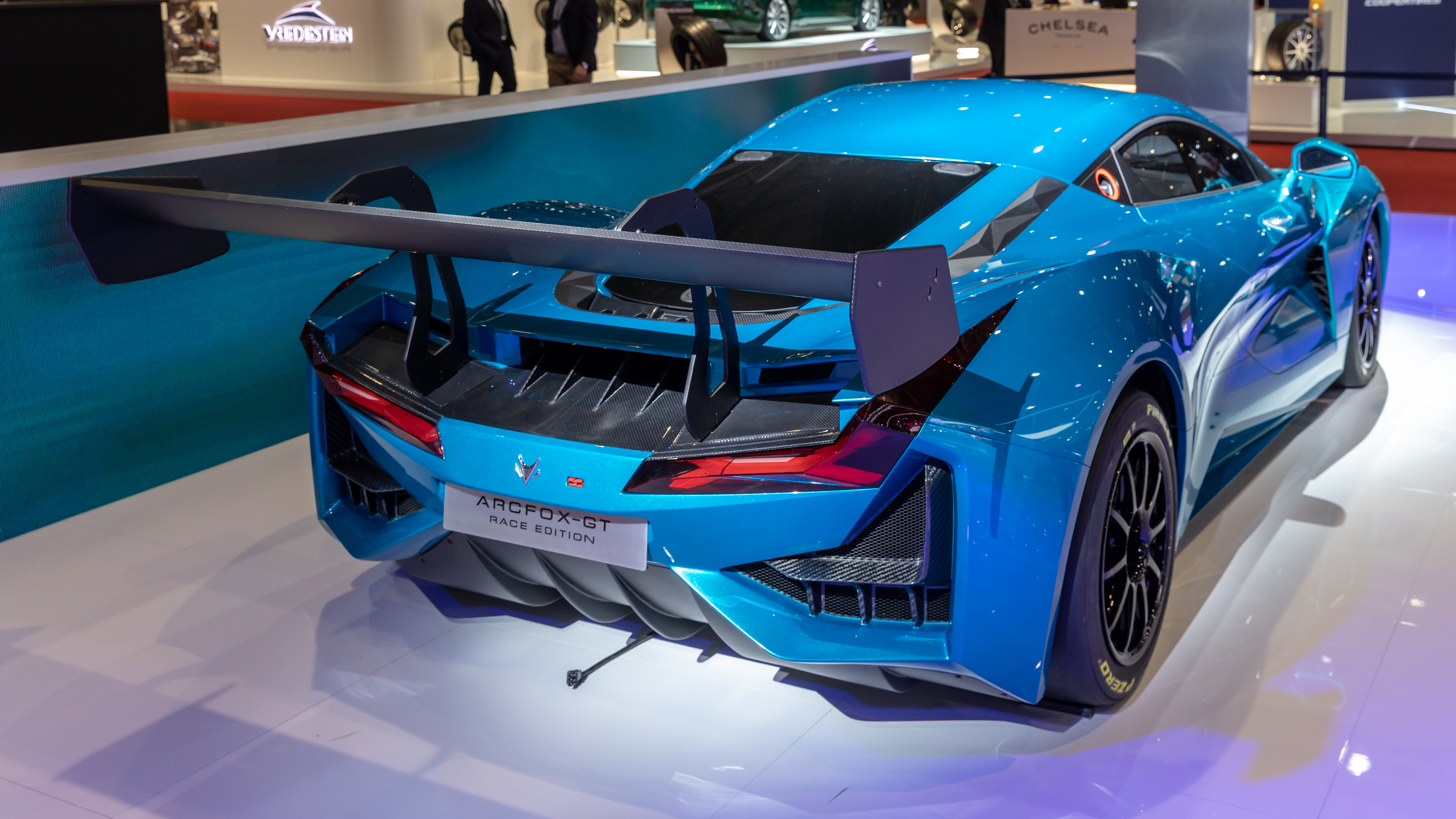
Rear view

== Technical data ==
The Street Edition produces 1,200 kW (1,609 hp) and 800 N⋅m (590 lb⋅ft) of torque, allowing it to accelerate from 0 to 100 km/h (62 mph) in 2.6 seconds. The top speed is 255 km/h (158 mph), and range on a single charge is up to 400 km (249 mi).
