= Arcfox =

Chinese EV brand

- Type: Division
- Industry: Automotive
- Founded: 2017; 9 years ago
- Headquarters: Beijing, China
- Area served: Mainland China
- Key people: Wang Qiufeng (President)
- Products: Automobiles
- Parent: BAIC BluePark
- Website: arcfox.com.cn

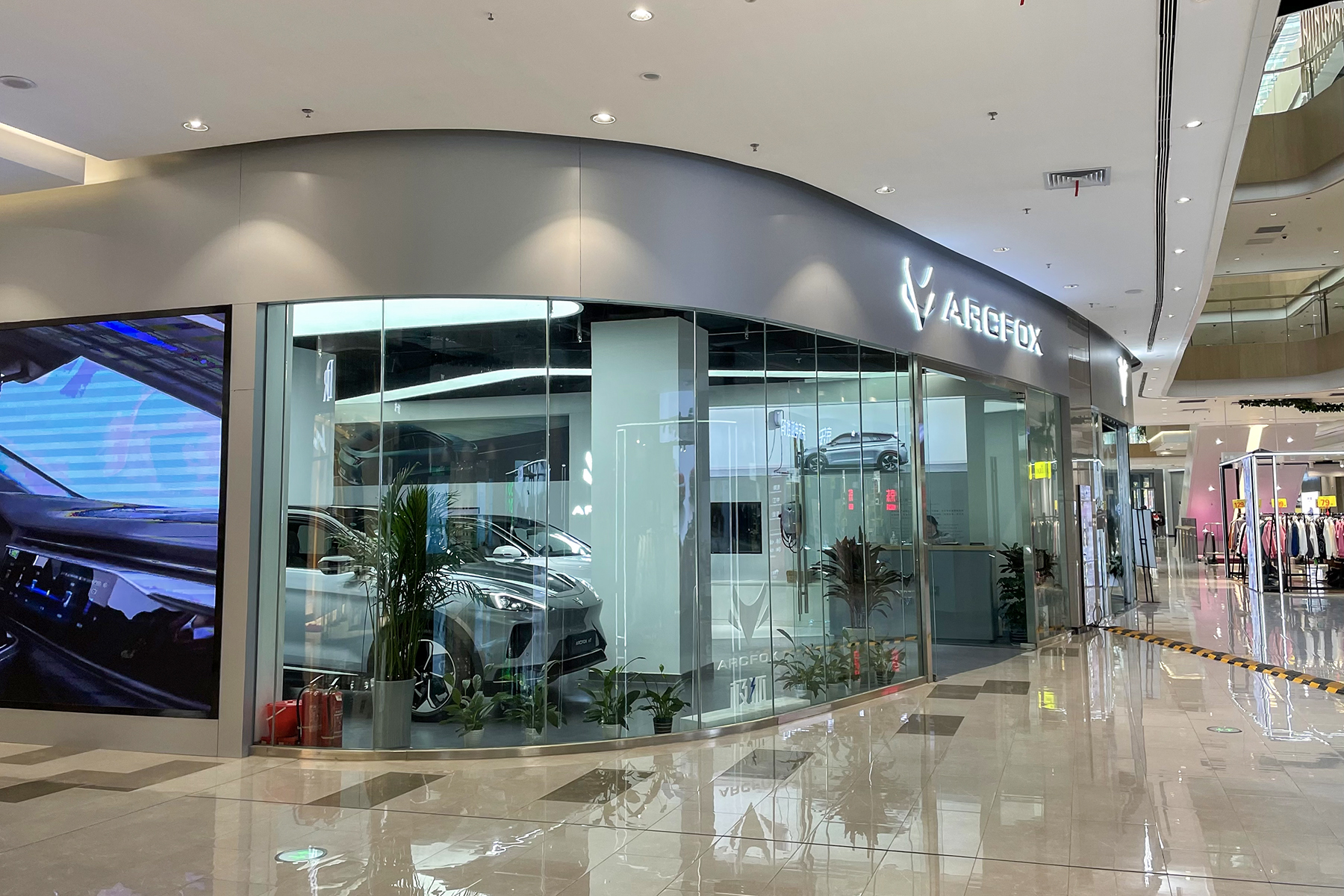
Arcfox showroom in Zhengzhou, China

Arcfox (极狐) is a Chinese marque of electric passenger cars and SUV owned by BAIC BluePark based in Beijing founded in 2017.

== History ==
=== Beginning ===
In 2017, the Chinese automotive giant BAIC Group decided to create a new subordinate brand dedicated to the development of electric cars. The first model to go on sale locally was a microcar called Lite aimed at the premium class. In March 2019, the global premiere of the Arcfox brand took place during the Geneva Motor Show, expressing the goals of expanding the Chinese brand's operations also on the European continent.

The designs presented under the Arcfox brand in Europe were completely different from the concept of the Lite. The first vehicle was a prototype of a large SUV ECF, whose styling was designed by designer Walter de Silva known for his work for Volkswagen Group. The second vehicle that participated in the world premiere of the Arcfox brand was the GT sports car, intended to present the capabilities of the BAIC Group designers. The vehicle was presented in both a basic and a special variant called Race Edition.

=== Further development ===
In 2020, the company focused on completely new designs built for the Chinese market in the form of technically advanced electric crossovers. In May 2020, the mid-size Alpha-T model debuted, and a year later the offer was expanded by the large crossover Alpha-S from then on, serving as the flagship design. In 2022, Arcfox started cooperation with the Chinese giant Huawei, equipping its cars available on the domestic market with the operating system.

In 2023, Arcfox began to further expand its model portfolio, launching in September this year the sale of a compact minivan Kaola with unusual interior design solutions aimed at mothers of small children. In December of the same year, the range was expanded by the compact crossover Alpha T5, and in the spring of 2024, Arcfox introduced the first classic passenger car - the Alpha S5 limousine.

== Vehicles ==
=== Current models ===
- Arcfox βS3 (2026–present), mid-size sedan, BEV
- Arcfox βT1 (2025–present, previously Arcfox T1), compact hatchback, BEV
- Arcfox αS5 (2024–present), mid-size sedan, BEV/EREV
- Arcfox αT5 (2024–present), compact SUV, BEV/EREV
- Arcfox αS6 (2021–present), mid-size SUV, BEV
- Arcfox αT6 (2020–present), mid-size SUV, BEV
- Arcfox αT7 (2026–present), mid-size SUV, BEV/EREV
- Arcfox Kaola (2023–present), compact MPV, BEV
- Arcfox Wendao V9 (2026–present), full-size MPV, EREV
Arcfox βS3

Arcfox βT1

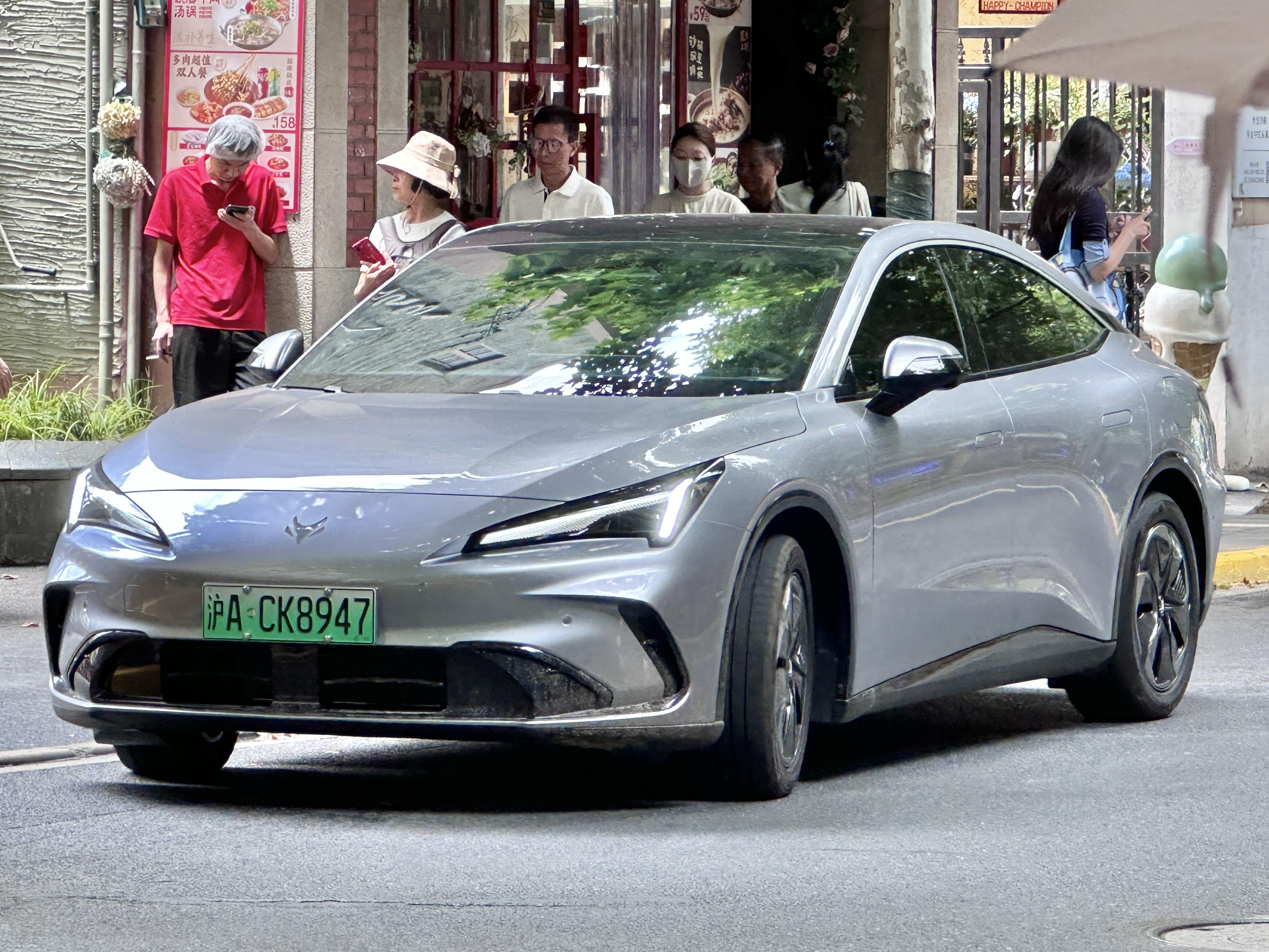
Arcfox αS5

Arcfox αT5

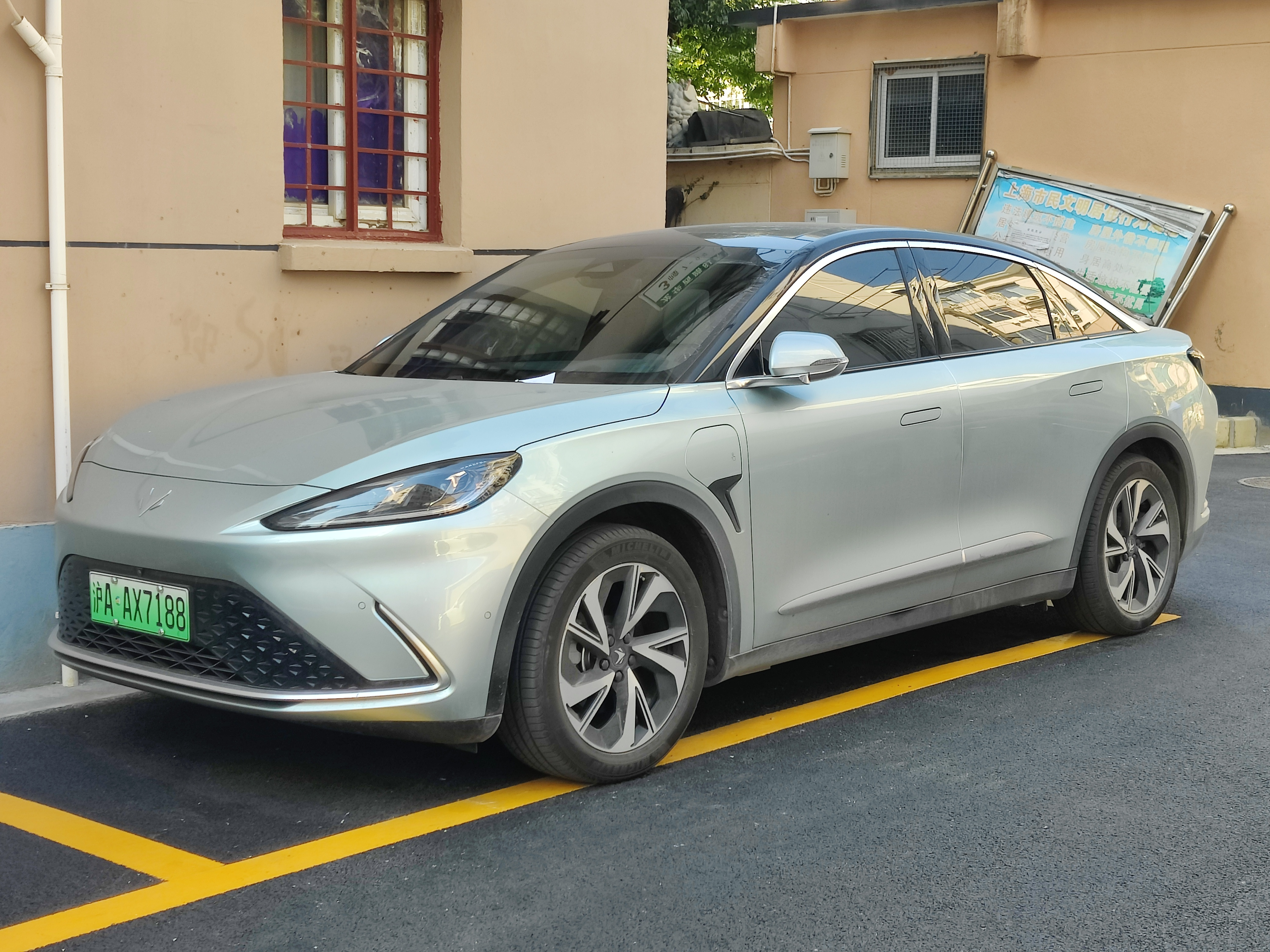
Arcfox αS6

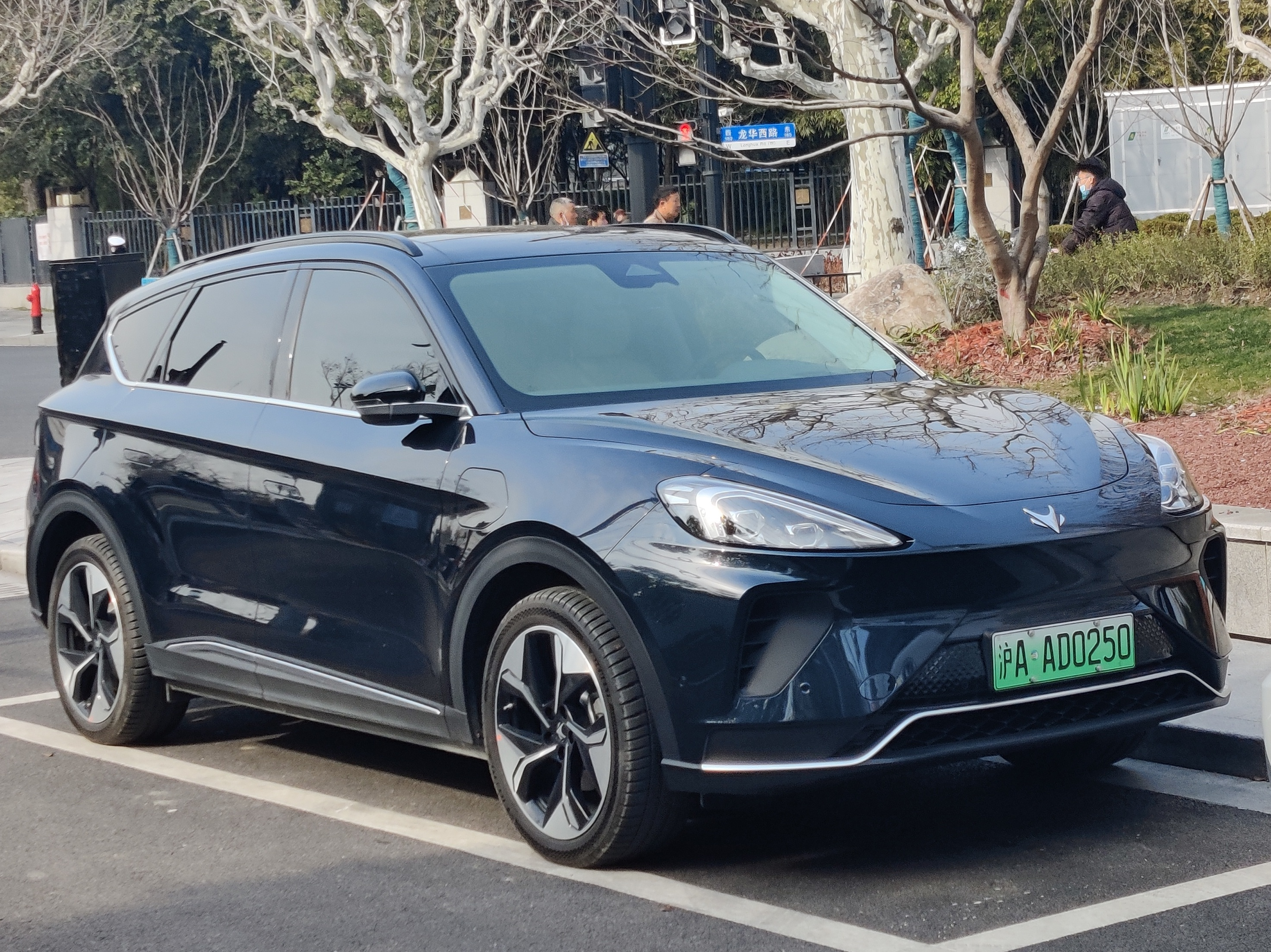
Arcfox αT6

Arcfox αT7

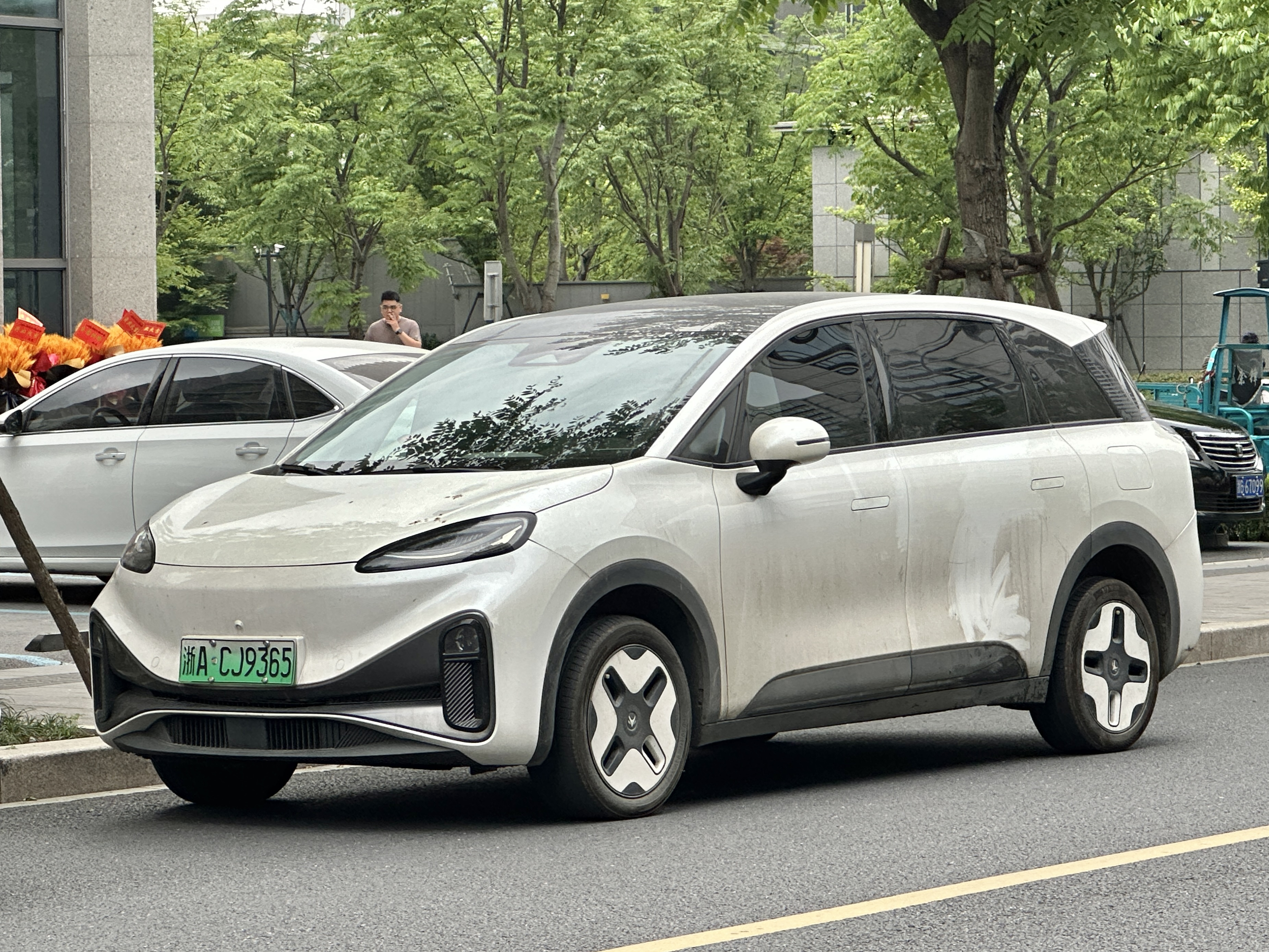
Arcfox Kaola

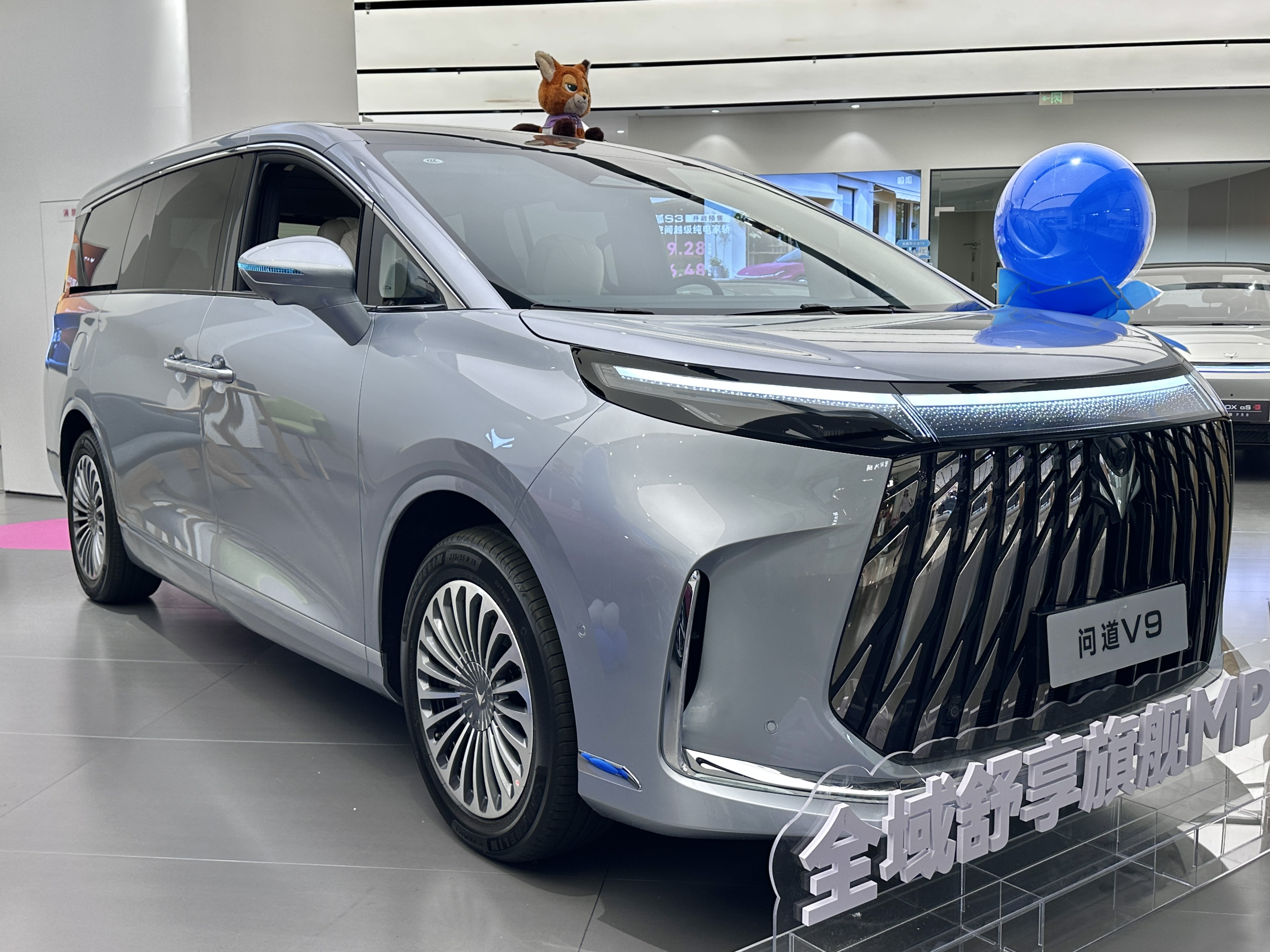
Arcfox Wendao V9

=== Discontinued models ===
- Arcfox Lite (2017–2020), city car, BEV
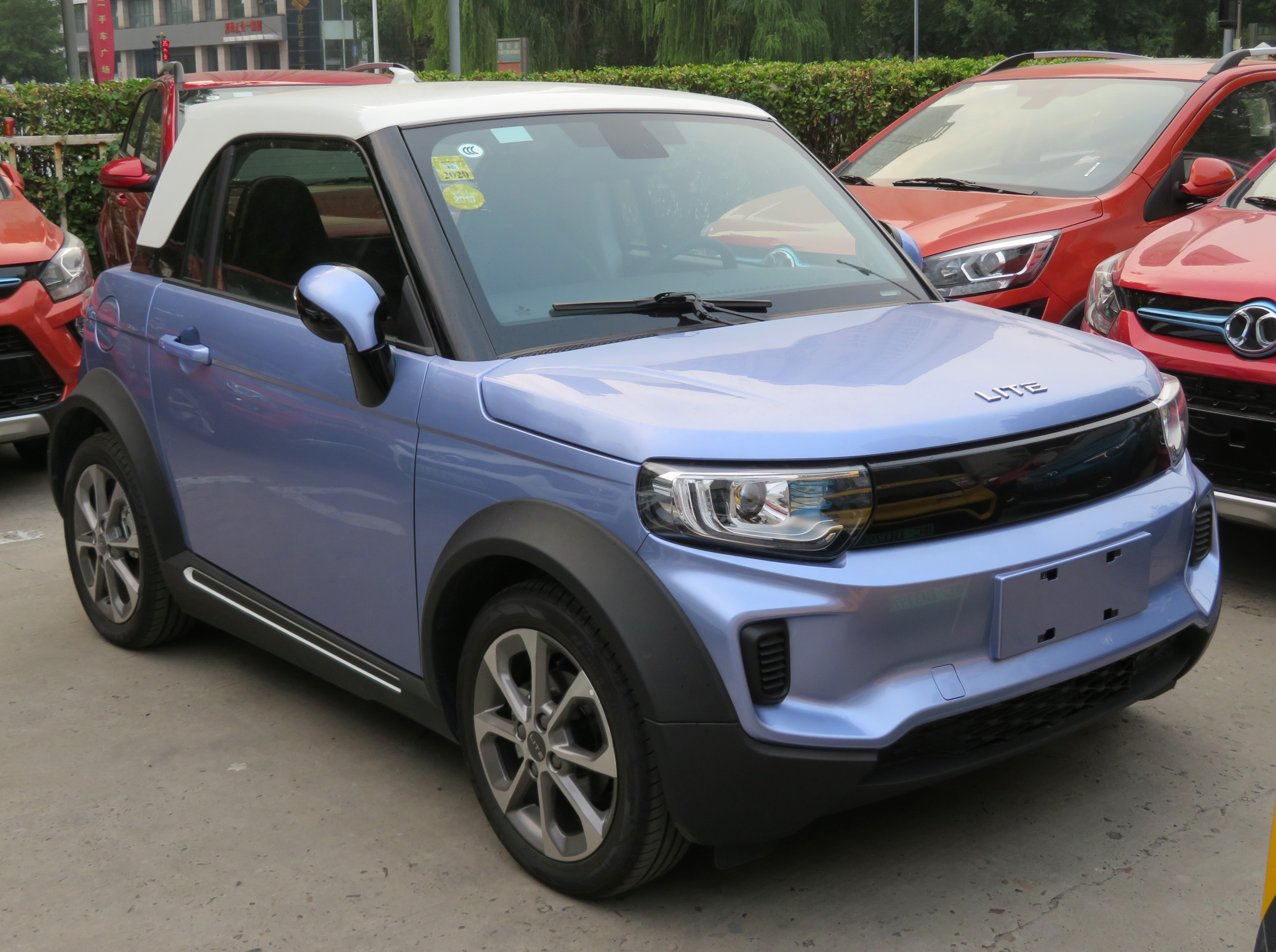
Arcfox Lite

=== Concept models ===
- Arcfox 77°, full-size MPV
- Arcfox ECF, mid-size SUV
- Arcfox GT, sports car
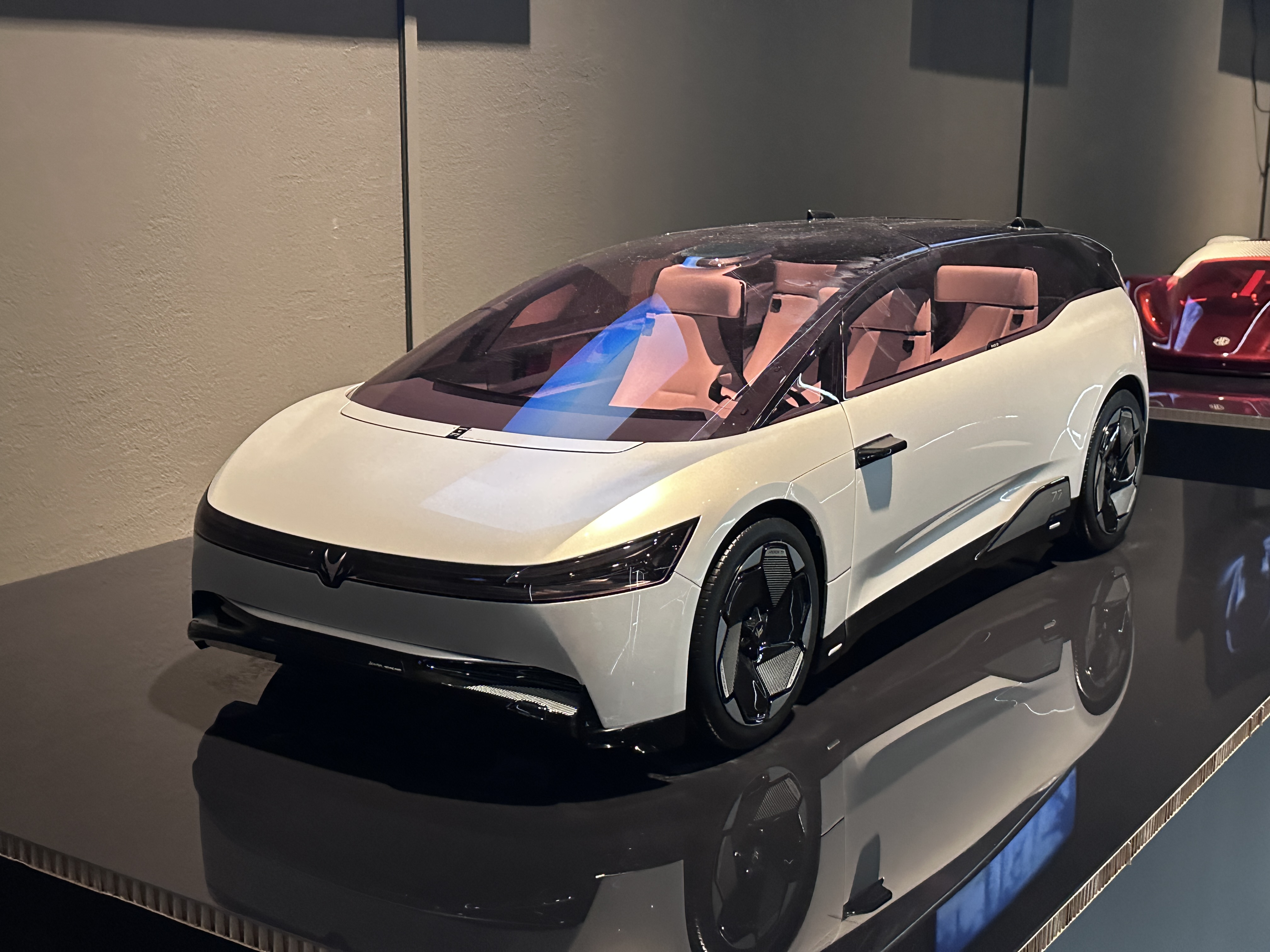
Arcfox 77°

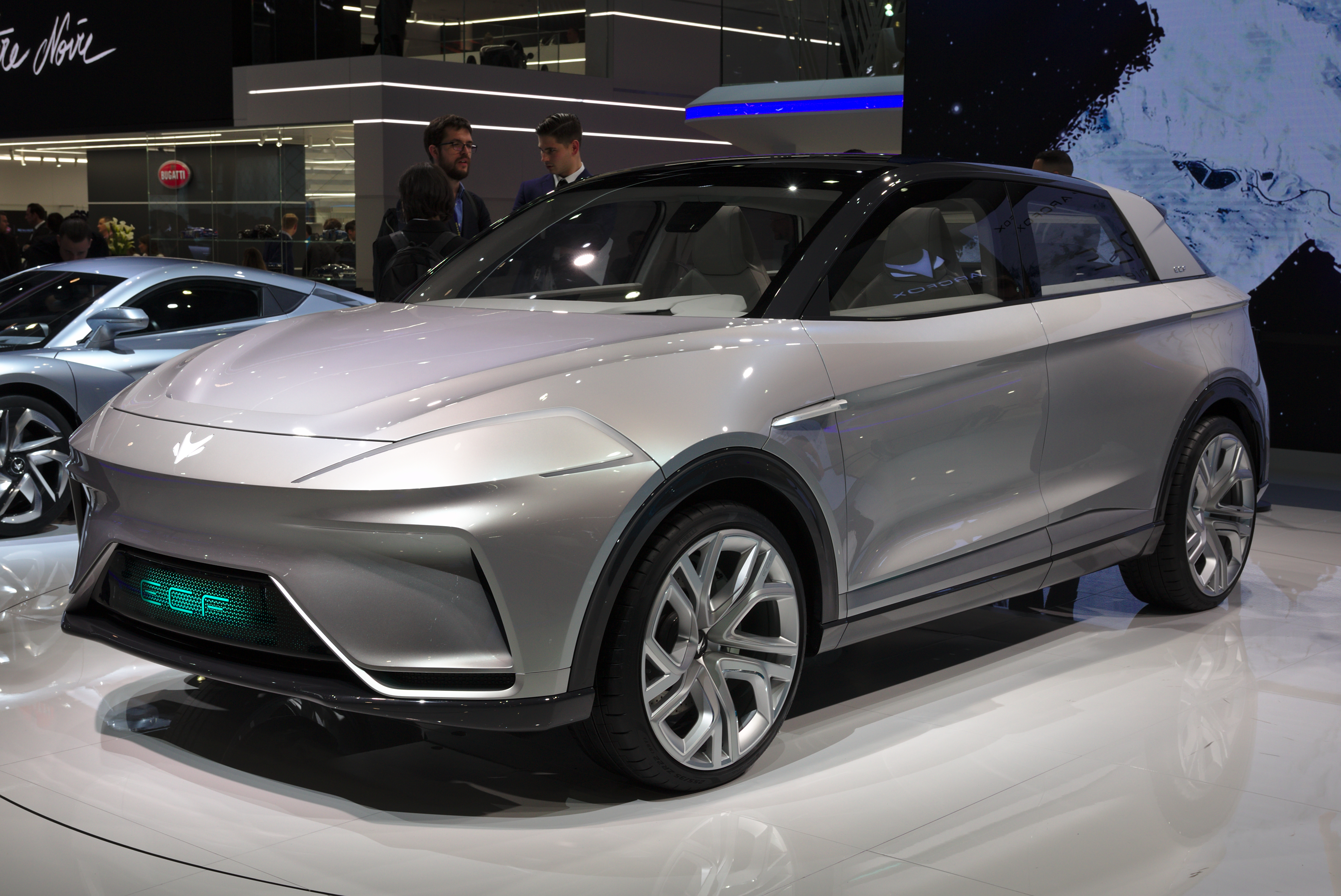
Arcfox ECF

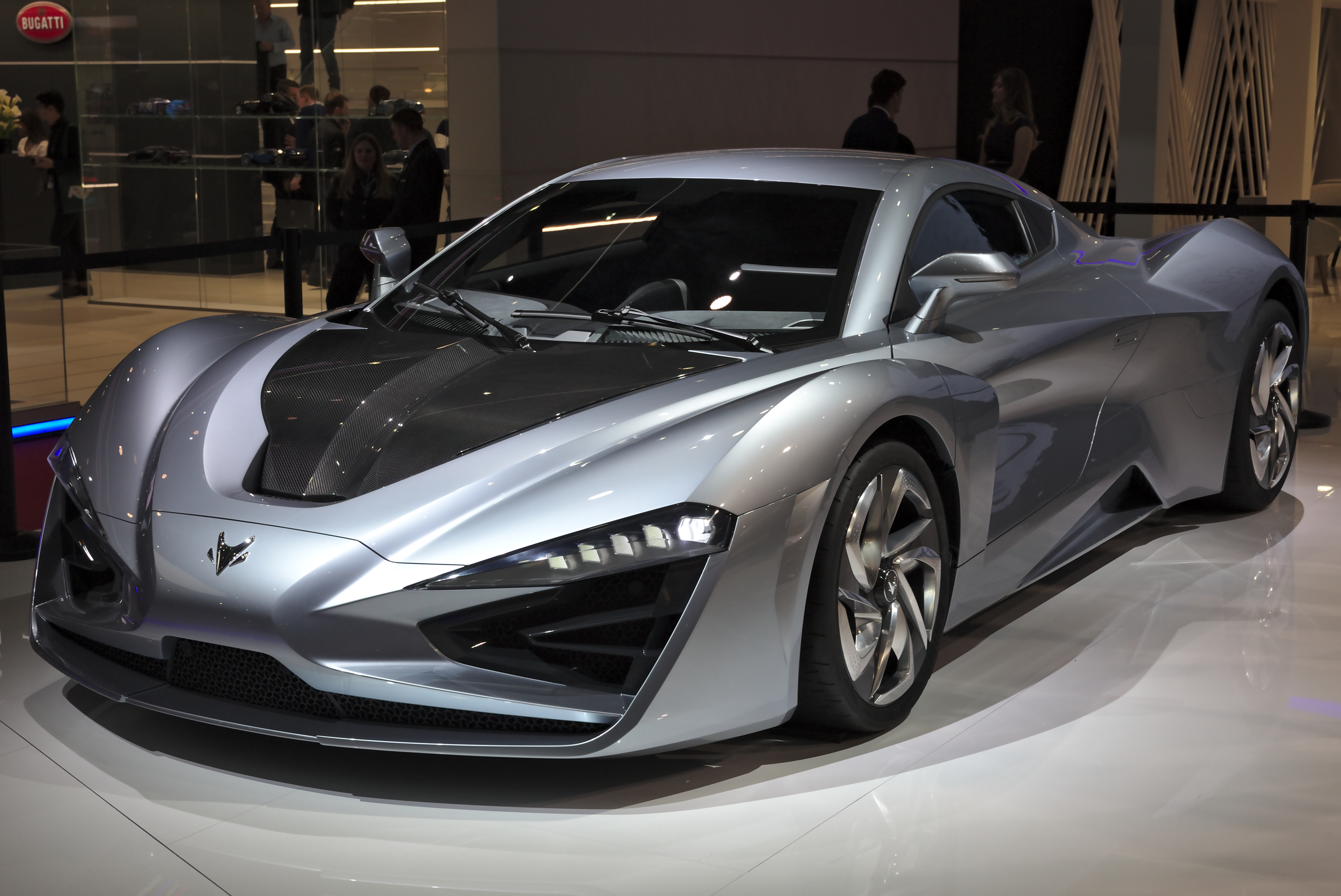
Arcfox GT

== Sales over the years ==
For a period of time a few years after Arcfox was founded, the market performance was poor, with insufficient sales in 2021 Xpeng, Nio, Li Auto One-twentieth. The sales volume in 2022 will be 11,895 units, which is only equivalent to the sales volume of the leading new car manufacturing force in one month. Sales volume will increase significantly to 30,016 vehicles in 2023.

Years	Total sales
2017	472
2018	588
2019	599
2020	721
2021	4,993
2022	11,895
2023	30,016
2024	81,017
2025	163,000

== Controversy ==
On July 24, 2024, an Arcfox αS spontaneously caught fire in Hangzhou. After firefighters brought the fire under control, Arcfox staff turned their clothes inside out and forcibly removed the car's emblem without the owner's consent. The next day, Arcfox issued an apology on Weibo for the "improper handling of the incident" by their staff.

== See also ==
- Automobile manufacturers and brands of China
- List of automobile manufacturers of China
