= Arcfox Beta S3 =

Battery electric executive sedan

- The Arcfox Beta S3 in Shanghai.

Overview
- Manufacturer: Arcfox (BAIC Group)
- Also called: Beijing EU8
- Production: 2026–present
- Assembly: China: Zhenjiang

Body and chassis
- Class: Executive car (E)
- Body style: 4-door sedan
- Layout: Front-motor, front-wheel drive; Rear-motor, rear-wheel drive; Dual motor 4WD

Powertrain
- Electric motor: AC induction/asynchronous, permanent magnet motor
- Power output: 218 hp (221 PS; 163 kW) (480S/653S); 435 hp (441 PS; 324 kW) (H)
- Transmission: 1-speed direct-drive reduction
- Battery: Li-ion battery: 41.7 kWh; 42.3 kWh; 67.3 kWh; 93.6 kWh
- Electric range: 410–653 km (255–406 miles)

Dimensions
- Wheelbase: 2,876 mm (113 in)
- Length: 4,916 mm (194 in)
- Width: 1,900 mm (75 in)
- Height: 1,480 mm (58 in)
- Curb weight: 1,630–2,005 kg (3,594–4,420 lb)

The Arcfox Beta S3 (Chinese: 极狐贝塔S3) is a battery electric executive sedan manufactured by BAIC under the Arcfox brand.

== Overview ==
The Beta S3 was introduced in April 2026 at the Beijing Auto Show.

The Beta S3 is strictly front-wheel drive only and powered by a permanent magnet synchronous motor with a maximum power output of 159 kW (213 hp) and 250 N·m of torque. 0 to 100 km/h acceleration time is 7.1 seconds. There are two versions of the Beta S3 offered. The battery-swapping variant utilizes CATL’s battery swap network, and has a CLTC range of 535 km (332 miles) and supports battery swaps to be done in 99 seconds. The charging model offers a CLTC range of 560 km (348 miles) or 660 km (410 miles) base on battery spec, and fast charging from 30% to 80% takes 28 minutes.

The Beta S3 is equipped with the 8155 chip of Qualcomm Snapdragon as standard, and more upmarket trims feature the “Yuanjing” intelligent driving assistance system, which utilizes a 192-line LiDAR and the Horizon Robotics Journey J6M chip to achieve autonomous and driving assist features.

Rear view

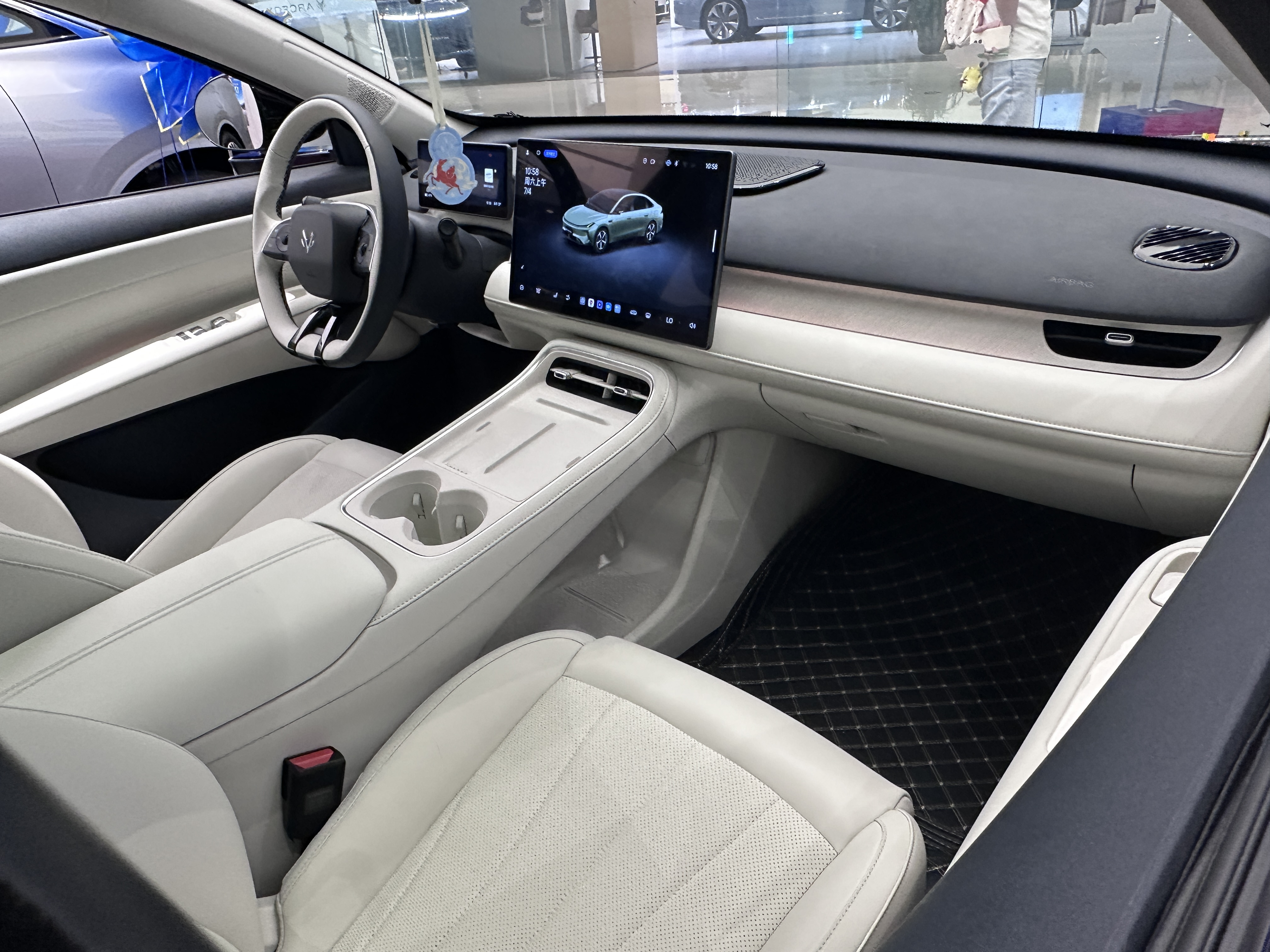
Interior

== Beijing EU8 ==
Launched by Beijing Auto in May, 2026, the Beijing EU8 is essentially a rebadged variant of the Arcfox Beta S3 targeted at the ridehailing market. From the exterior, the EU8 features a restyled front end giving it a more featureless anonymous look. Just like the Beta S3, there are two versions of the EU8 aimed at different taxi vehicle markets, a battery-swap version with a CLTC range of 535 km (332 miles), and a charging version with a CLTC range of 501 km (311 miles).
