= Arcfox Lite =

Chinese microcar

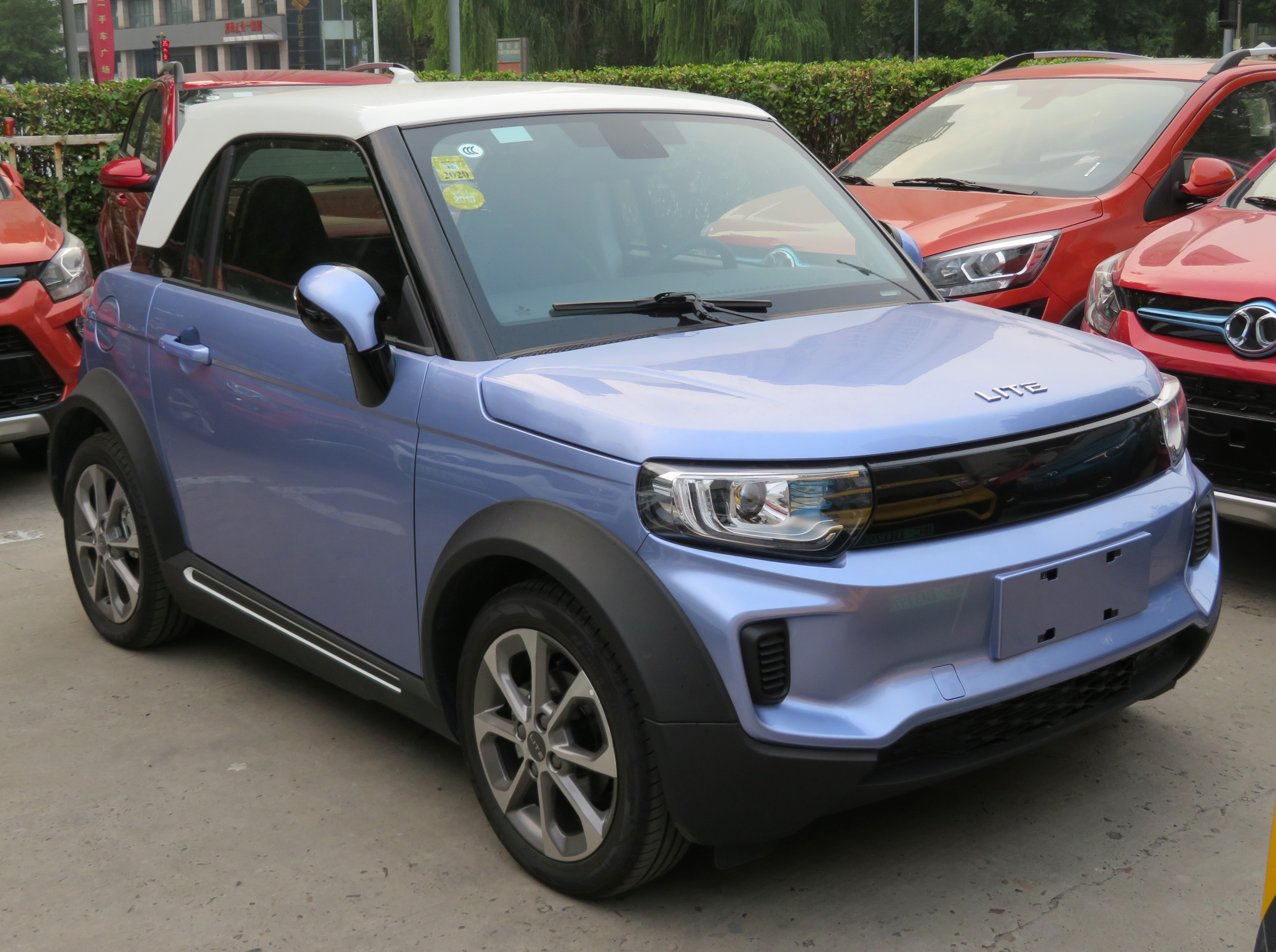

Overview
- Manufacturer: Arcfox (BAIC Group)
- Production: 2017–2020; 1,674 units sold
- Assembly: China: Zhenjiang

Body and chassis
- Class: Microcar
- Body style: 3-door hatchback
- Layout: RR layout
- Related: Tazzari Zero

Powertrain
- Electric motor: AC induction/asynchronous, Permanent magnet motor
- Power output: 37 kW (50 hp; 50 PS)
- Transmission: 1-speed direct-drive
- Battery: Li-ion battery: 16.4 kWh
- Electric range: 150 km (31 mi)

Dimensions
- Wheelbase: 1,870 mm (74 in)
- Length: 2,986 mm (118 in)
- Width: 1,676 mm (66 in)
- Height: 1,492 mm (59 in)
- Curb weight: 870 kg (1,918 lb)

The Arcfox Lite is a battery electric microcar manufactured by BAIC under the Arcfox brand between 2017 and 2020.

== Overview ==
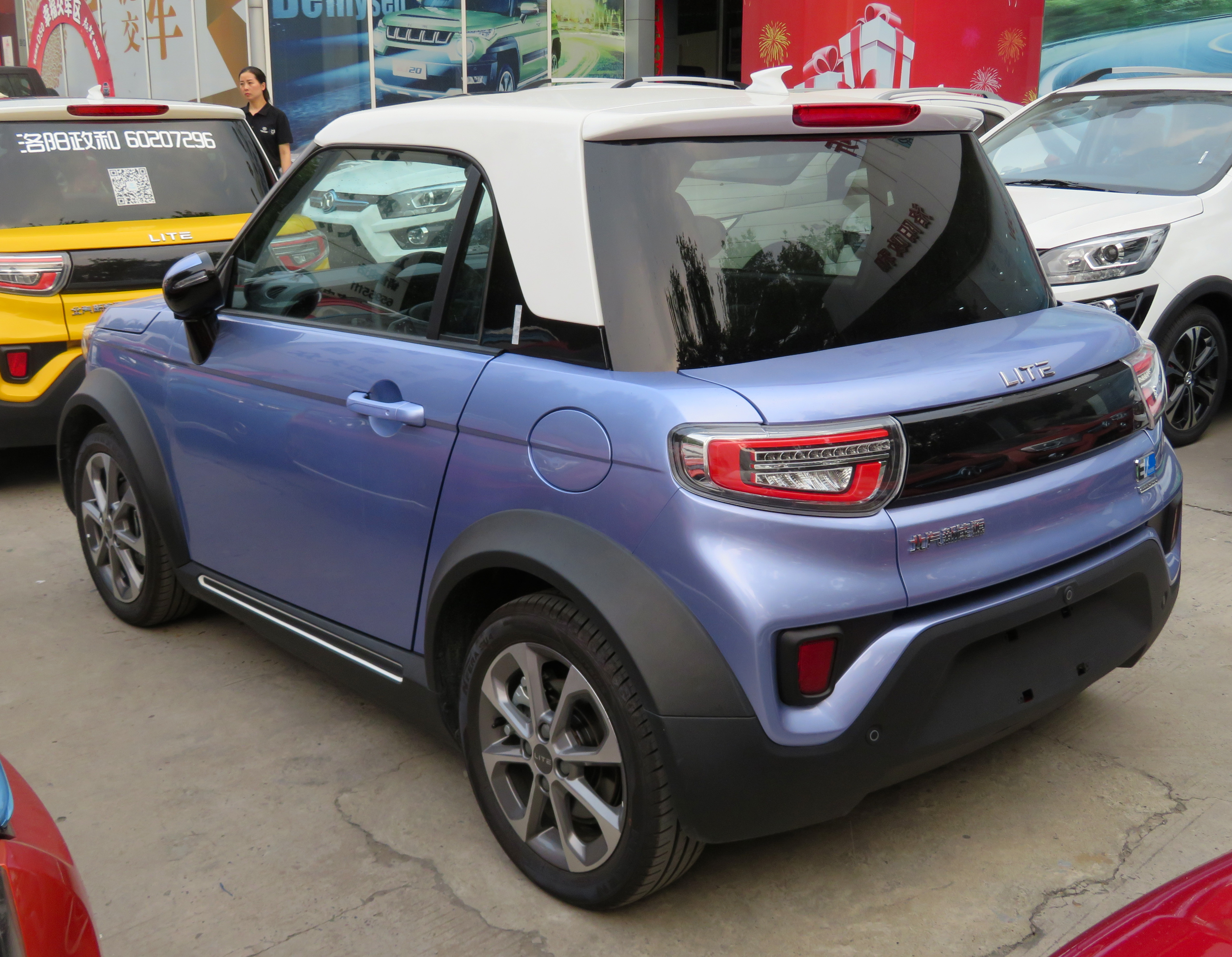
Arcfox Lite rear

In 2016, the Chinese automaker BAIC Group introduced the pre-production Lite R300 model, which was originally intended to power the BJEV electric car sub-brand. Ultimately, the car went on sale under the newly established Arcfox brand at the end of 2017, as another model with electrically powered microcars steadily gaining popularity in China.

In terms of design, the Lite adopts the avant-garde form of a hatchback with a short, stepped rear and two-color body paint, as well as a distinctive, luminous strip between the headlights.

== Specifications ==
The Lite's electrical system is co-created by a 16.4 kWh battery, developing a total power of 37 kW (50 hp) and a maximum torque of 120 N⋅m (89 lb⋅ft). The maximum range of the vehicle on a single charge is approximately 150 kilometers.
