= Arcfox Alpha T7 =

Mid-size crossover SUV

Arcfox αT7
- The Arcfox αT7 in Shanghai.

Overview
- Manufacturer: Arcfox (BAIC Group)
- Production: 2026–present
- Assembly: China: Zhenjiang

Body and chassis
- Class: Mid-size crossover SUV
- Body style: 5-door SUV
- Layout: Front-engine, rear-motor, rear-wheel drive; Rear-motor, rear-wheel drive

Powertrain
- Engine: Petrol plug-in hybrid: 1.5 L A156A1 I4
- Electric motor: PMSM
- Power output: 268–305 hp (200–227 kW; 272–309 PS)
- Transmission: Single-speed gear reduction
- Battery: 43.9 kWh LFP CATL; 75.4 kWh LFP CATL; 84.8 kWh LFP CATL
- Range: 1,115 km (693 mi) (EREV, WLTP)
- Electric range: 650–715 km (404–444 mi) (EV, CLTC); 232 km (144 mi) (EREV, WLTP); 320 km (199 mi) (EREV, CLTC)

Dimensions
- Wheelbase: 3,040 mm (120 in)
- Length: 5,020 mm (198 in)
- Width: 1,996 mm (79 in)
- Height: 1,685 mm (66 in)
- Curb weight: 1,980–2,050 kg (4,365–4,519 lb)

The Arcfox αT7 (Chinese: 极狐阿尔法T7) is a battery electric and range-extended mid-size crossover SUV manufactured by BAIC under the Arcfox brand.

== Overview ==
The αT7 was made its public debut at the 2026 Chengdu Auto Show in late August, and pre-orders opened days later on 26 August 2026. Deliveries commenced on 1 November 2026.

It has a drag coefficient of 0.251C_{d} which Arcfox says was reduced by making 30 modifications and increases range by 60 km (37 mi). It has a 200-litre (7.1 cu ft) frunk which can hold up to 80 kg (176 lb) of cargo. It has a 645-litre (22.8 cu ft) rear cargo area, which expands to 1,845 L (65.2 cu ft) with the rear seats folded down.

The dashboard features a 1.1-meter wide panoramic HUD display at the base of the windshield functioning as the instrument cluster and information display, with a 17.3-inch 3K-resolution central infotainment touchscreen capable of split screen mode located in the center of the dashboard; both are powered by a Mediatek MTK8676 SoC. It has a 21-speaker sound system with NCPA branding, which is supplemented by low frequency vibrators located in the seats. The voice command system can accept and respond to commands from the exterior using microphones and an UWB key system. The center console features a 8.2-litre (0.3 cu ft) refrigerator compartment with a temperature range of −6–50 °C (21–122 °F).

It has optional continuous damping control. Arcfox says the αT7's chassis consists of 89% high-strength steel and uses a single-piece large casting for the door frame, leading to a torsional rigidity of 51,000 N·m/deg.

The αT7 can be optionally equipped with the Huawei Qiankun ADS 5 Pro Level 2 ADAS system capable of urban and highway assisted driving, with a sensor suite consisting of 1 Huawei Limera under-windshield LiDAR, 3 4D mmWave radars, 11 cameras, and 12 ultrasonic sensors.

Rear view

Interior

== Powertrain ==
The αT7 is available with range-extender and pure battery electric powertrains.

Range extender variants have a 1.5-liter naturally aspirated direct-injected inline-4 petrol engine in Atkinson cycle, which outputs 95 hp (71 kW; 96 PS) (103 hp (77 kW; 104 PS) gross) at 6,000rpm and 132 N⋅m (97 lb⋅ft) of torque at 4,000rpm and does not mechanically drive the wheels. It is equipped with a rear traction motor codenamed TZ220XY420 outputting 268 hp (200 kW; 272 PS) and 334 N⋅m (246 lb⋅ft) of torque. Power is supplied by a CATL-supplied 43.9 kWh LFP battery pack providing of 232 kilometres (144 mi) WLTP electric range and is capable of recharging from 30–80% in 15 minutes; it has a combined range of 1,115 kilometres (693 mi) when using the range extender.

Battery electric variants are equipped with a rear traction motor codenamed TZ220XY410 outputting 305 hp (227 kW; 309 PS) and 334 N⋅m (246 lb⋅ft) of torque. Power is supplied by either 75.4 or 84.8 kWh LFP battery packs supplied by CATL providing of 650 and 715 kilometres (404 and 444 mi) of CLTC range, respectively and are both capable of recharging from 30–80% in 15 minutes utilizing their 800-volt class power electronics.

Specifications
Battery		Power	Torque	Electric range		30–80% time	0–100 km/h (62 mph) time	Top speed	Kerb weight
Type	Weight	Power	Torque	WLTP	CLTC	30–80% time	0–100 km/h (62 mph) time	Top speed	Kerb weight
43.9 kWh LFP	305 kg (672 lb)	268 hp (200 kW; 272 PS)	334 N⋅m (246 lb⋅ft)	232 km (144 mi)	320 km (199 mi)	15 min	7.6 sec	180 km/h (112 mph)	2,000 kg (4,409 lb)
75.4 kWh LFP	486 kg (1,071 lb)	305 hp (227 kW; 309 PS)	334 N⋅m (246 lb⋅ft)	—	650 km (404 mi)	15 min	6.8 sec	180 km/h (112 mph)	1,980 kg (4,365 lb)
84.8 kWh LFP	549 kg (1,210 lb)	305 hp (227 kW; 309 PS)	334 N⋅m (246 lb⋅ft)	—	715 km (444 mi)	15 min	7.0 sec	180 km/h (112 mph)	2,050 kg (4,519 lb)

== Sales ==
After pre-sales opened on 26 August 2026, Arcfox announced that the αT7 received over 10,000 pre-orders within 2 hours. After the car's launch on 16 September 2026, Arcfox announced that the αT7 received over 30,000 locked-in orders within 1 hour. Pre-orders reached 60,000 units after 21 days.
