= Arcfox Alpha-S6 =

Battery electric mid-size crossover SUV

Arcfox αS6
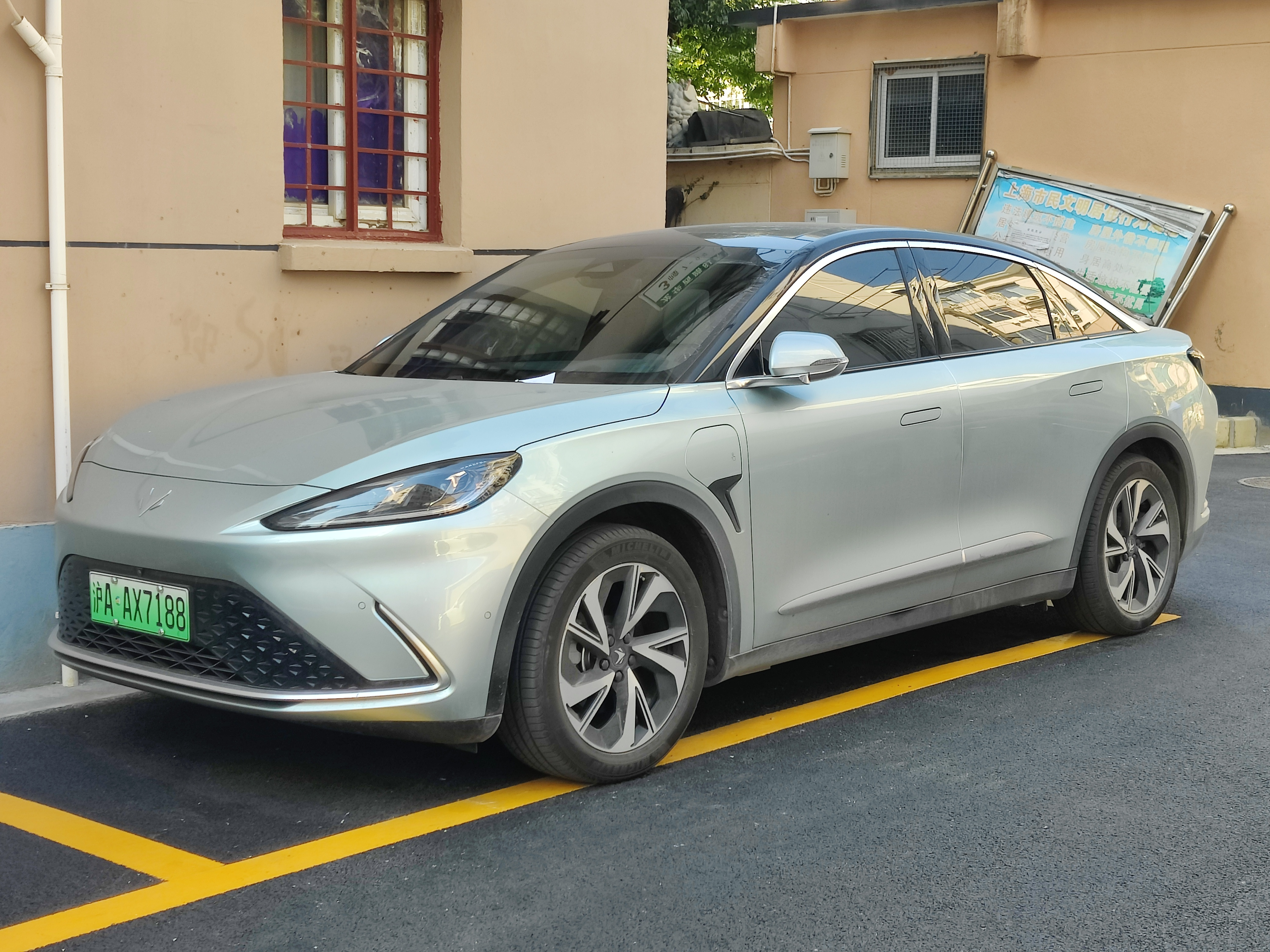
- The Arcfox αS6 in Shanghai.

Overview
- Manufacturer: Arcfox (BAIC Group)
- Also called: Arcfox Alpha-S (2021–2025)
- Production: 2021–present
- Assembly: China: Zhenjiang

Body and chassis
- Class: Mid-size crossover SUV
- Body style: 5-door SUV
- Layout: Front-motor, front-wheel drive; Rear-motor, rear-wheel drive; Dual-motor, four-wheel drive

Powertrain
- Electric motor: Permanent magnet asynchronous motor
- Power output: 218 hp (221 PS; 163 kW) (FWD); 435 hp (441 PS; 324 kW) (4WD); 643 hp (652 PS; 479 kW) (HUAWEI Inside)
- Transmission: 1-speed direct-drive reduction
- Battery: Li-ion battery: 67.3 kWh; 93.6 kWh
- Electric range: 525–708 km (326–440 mi)

Dimensions
- Wheelbase: 2,915 mm (114.8 in)
- Length: 4,980 mm (196.1 in)
- Width: 1,960 mm (77.2 in)
- Height: 1,599 mm (63.0 in)

The Arcfox αS6 (Chinese: 极狐阿尔法S6), previously the Arcfox Alpha-S until 2025, is a battery electric mid-size crossover SUV manufactured by BAIC under the Arcfox brand.

== Overview ==
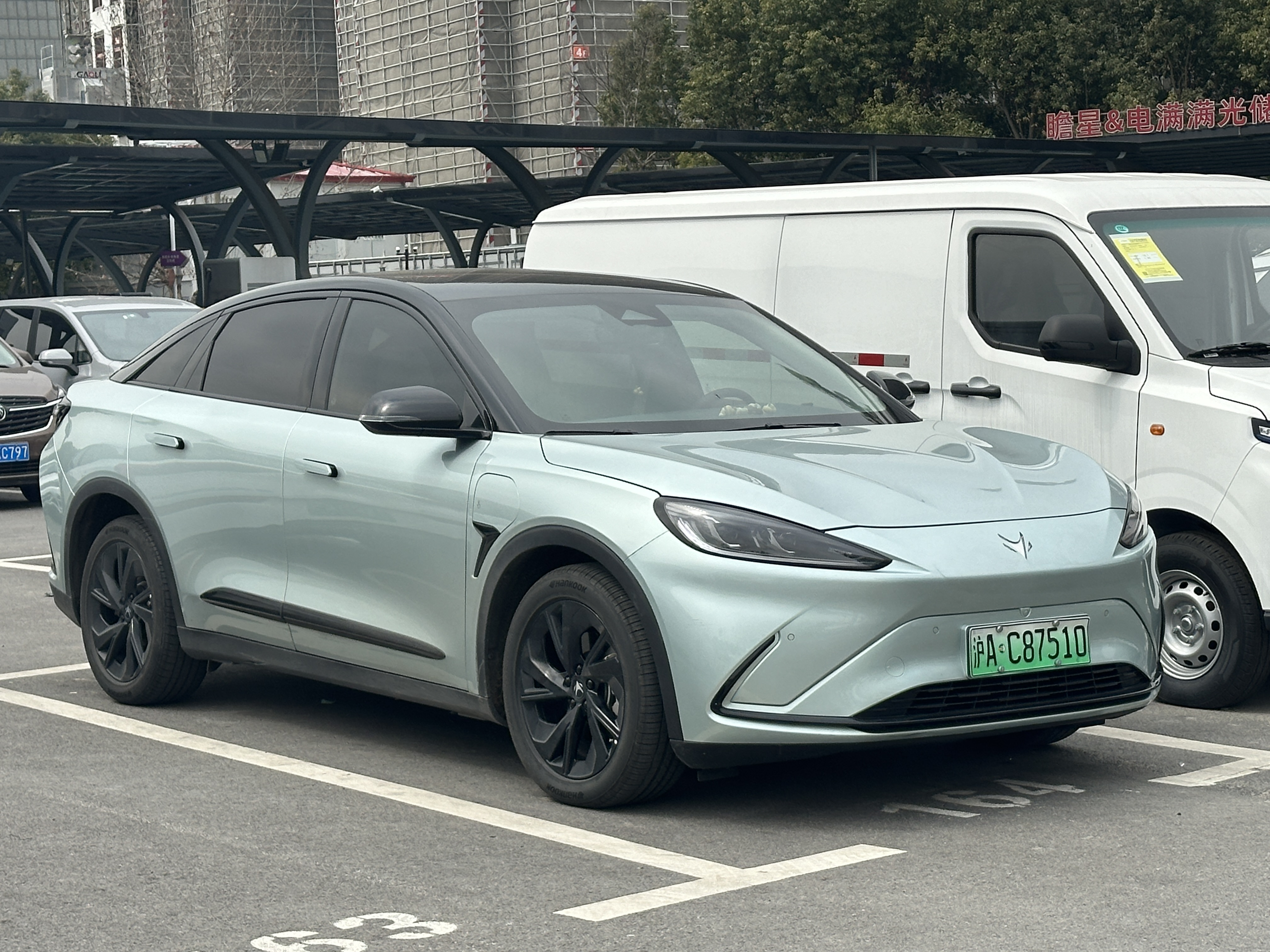
Arcfox α-S Forest Edition

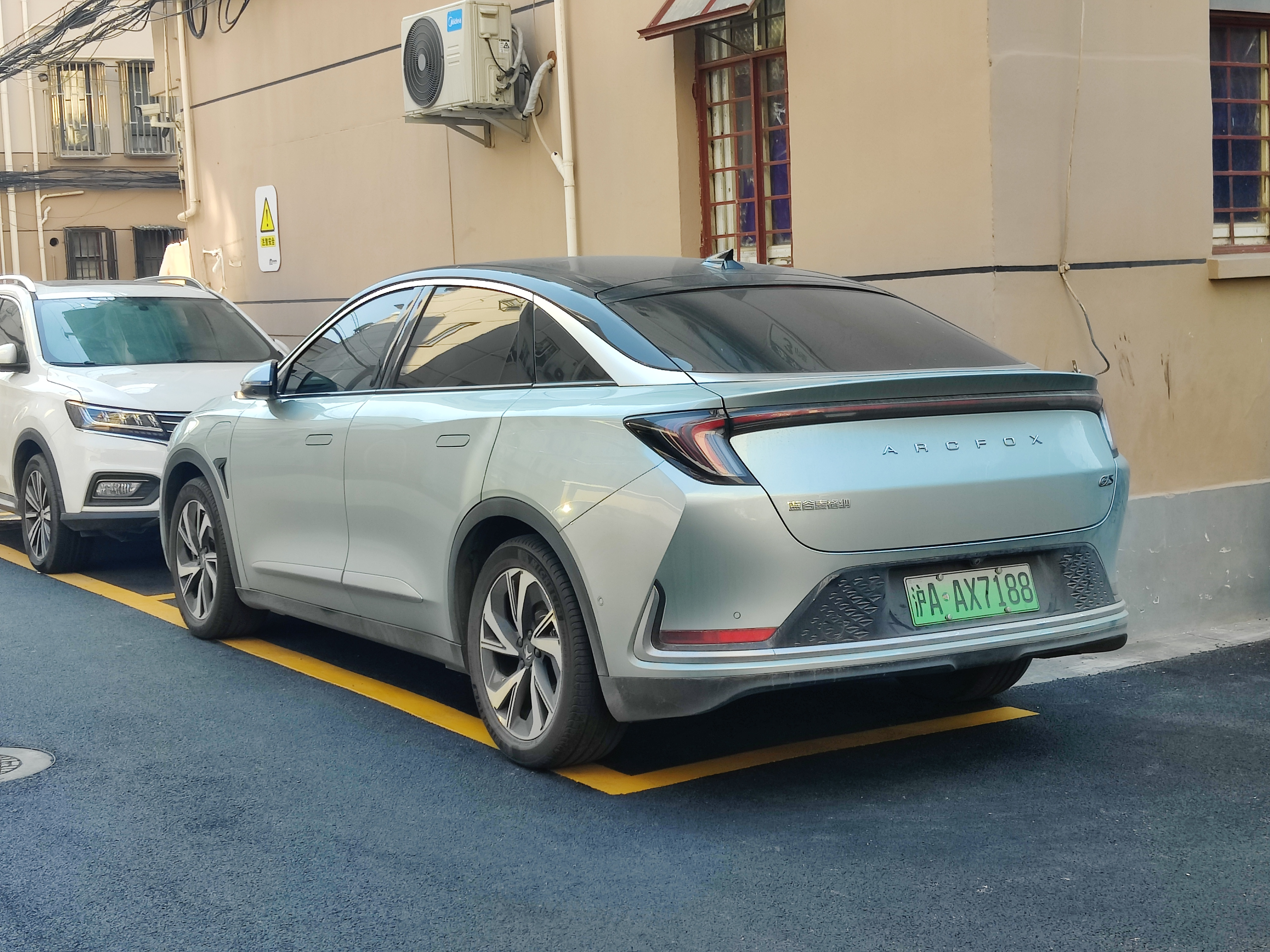
Rear view

Rear view (Forest Edition)

In the second half of January 2021, the Chinese automobile division Arcfox presented a new large electric crossover, which, like the smaller αT6 model, was called αS6 and was kept in a similar stylistic formula.

The car got aggressively styled headlights, an imitation of the air intake in the shape of a trapezoid, and a pointed front apron. In addition, the vehicle has a gently sloping roof line, as well as retractable door handles and rear lamps connected by a luminous strip.

The electrical system of the αS6 consists of a 218 hp (163 kW; 221 PS) electric motor that provides a maximum torque of 360 N⋅m (266 lb⋅ft). In terms of the available variants of the battery, the manufacturer has provided three variants that will allow the vehicle to drive 525, 603 or 708 kilometres (326, 375 or 440 mi) on a single charge according to the Chinese NEDC measurement procedure.

Electronics for the αS6 are co-developed with Huawei.

In July 2021, the Chinese automotive media outlet Dongchedi released a video of a 50% offset crash test at 64 km/h between an Arcfox αS6 and a BYD Han EV. Both vehicles provided adequate occupant protection, though the BYD Han sustained greater structural damage, including A-pillar deformation and electrical disconnection. Approximately 48 hours later, the Han EV caught fire after being parked; BYD stated that the test vehicle had been filled with a conductive coolant differing from its standard non-conductive fluid, which may have caused a short circuit and subsequent fire. The company also noted that the testing method was non-standard and not conducted by an official body.

== Sales ==
Year	China
2021	2,212
2022	6,054
2023	8,977
2024	8,375
2025	2,699
