= Bestune NAT =

Compact MPV

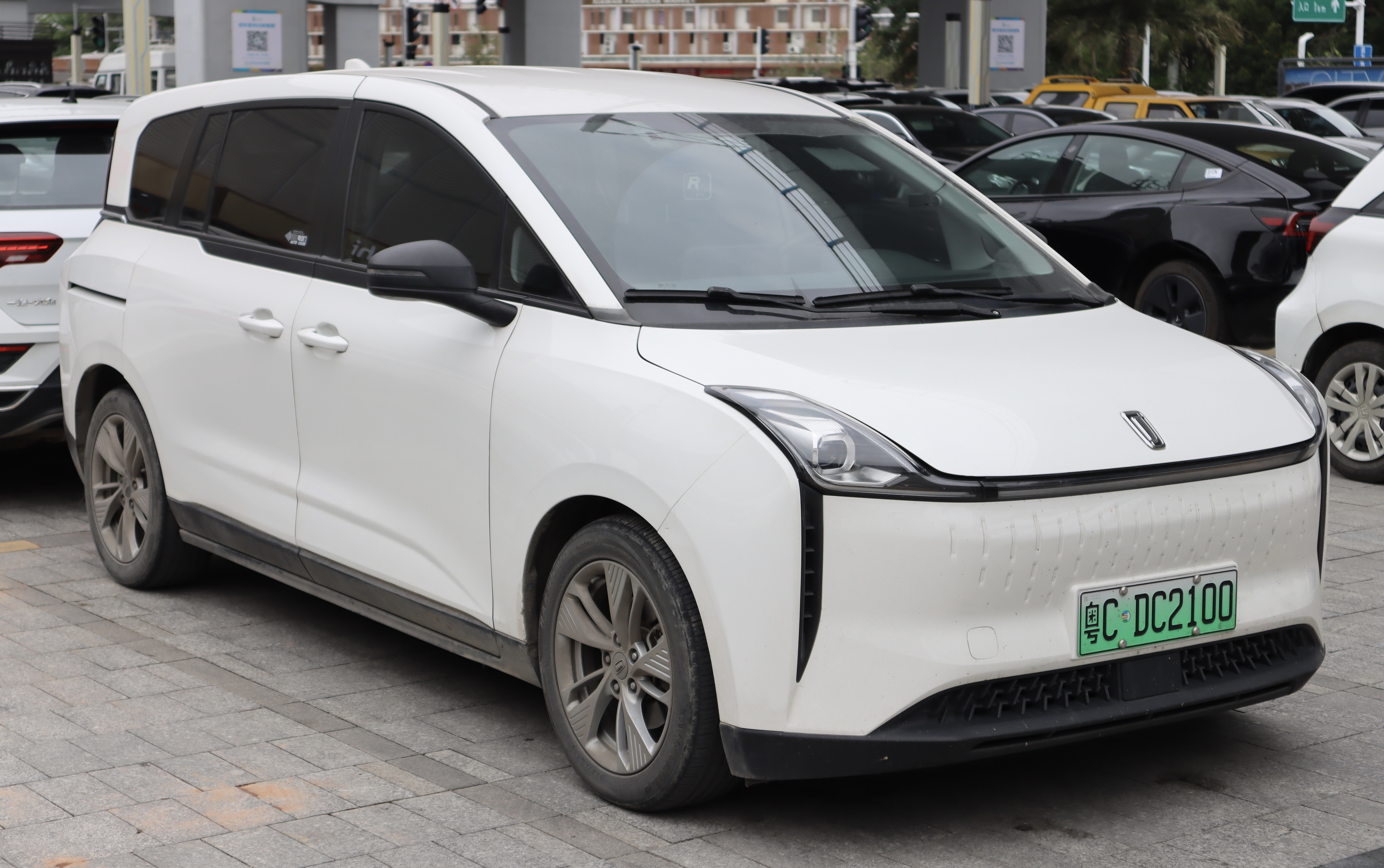

Overview
- Manufacturer: Bestune (FAW Group)
- Also called: Bestune E05; SEV E-NAT (Mexico)
- Production: 2021–2026 (China); 2022–present (export)
- Assembly: China: Changchun

Body and chassis
- Class: Compact MPV (M)
- Body style: 5-door minivan
- Layout: Front-engine, front-wheel-drive
- Platform: FME electric platform

Powertrain
- Electric motor: 100–140 kW (140–190 PS; 130–190 hp) permanent-magnet synchronous motor
- Battery: 55 or 61 kWh li-ion battery
- Range: Up to 450 km (280 mi)

Dimensions
- Wheelbase: 2,850 mm (112 in)
- Length: 4,451 mm (175.2 in)
- Width: 1,844 mm (72.6 in)
- Height: 1,681 mm (66.2 in)
- Curb weight: 1,700 kg (3,748 lb)

The Bestune NAT (Chinese: 奔騰NAT) is a battery electric compact MPV produced by the FAW Group under the brand name Bestune. The NAT was called as the Bestune E05 during the development phase and was renamed after the initial reveal. According to Bestune, the NAT stands for “Next Automatic Taxi”. It was mainly developed for ride-hailing services.

== Overview ==
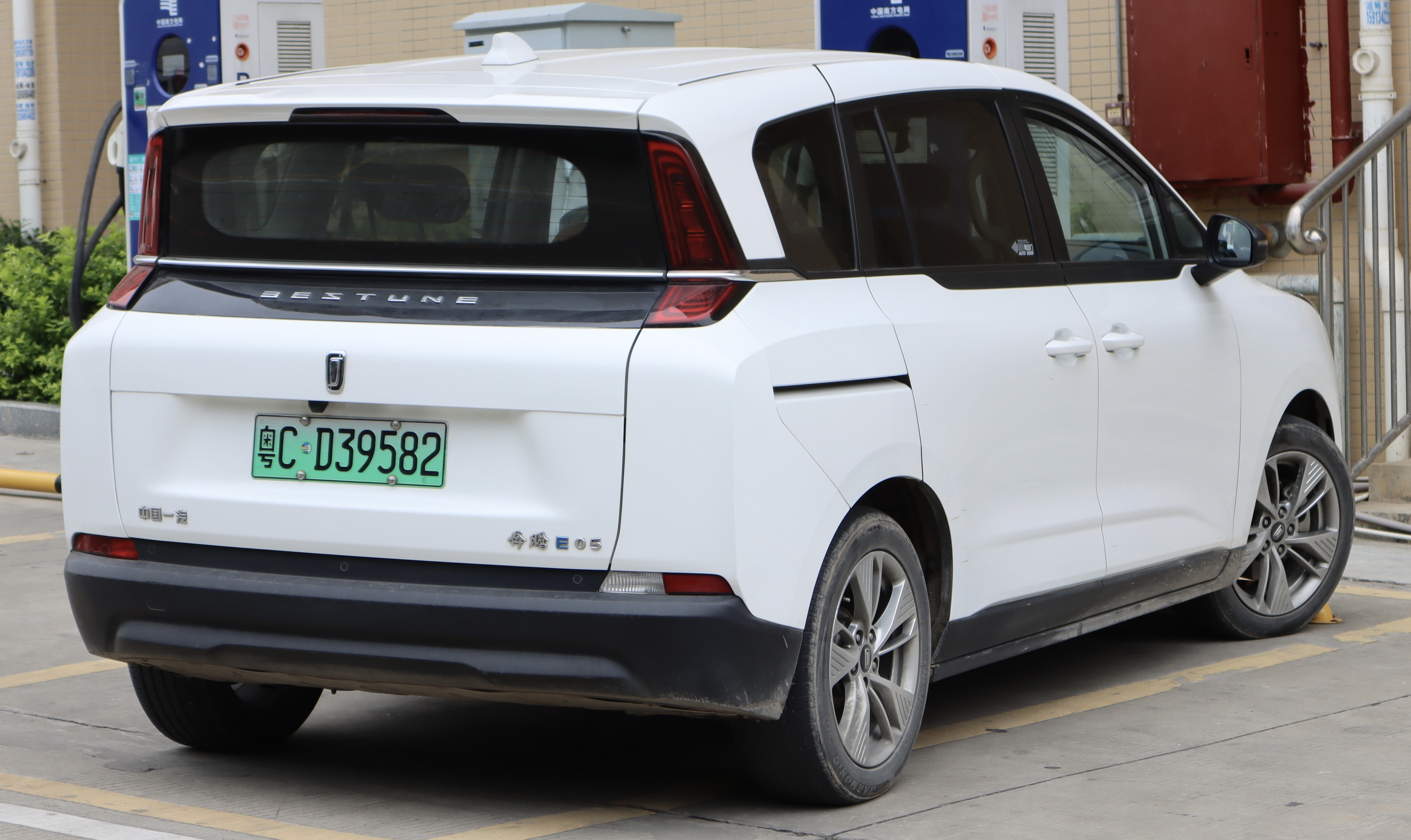
Rear view

The NAT was first shown at the 2021 Haikou International New Energy Vehicle and Connected Mobility Show. It has 190 horsepower (142 kW; 193 PS) and a range of 450 kilometres (280 mi). The NAT has dimensions of 4451 mm/1844 mm/1681 mm. It is was exported to Russia and Vietnam in 2022.

Just like the BYD D1, the NAT features a sliding door on the right side to free passengers from opening the door and potentially hitting cyclists or pedestrians.

Four different versions are planned with two versions designated for taxis, a variant for the DiDi ride hailing service and a variant for the FAW-backed T3 ride hailing service.

== Sales ==
Year	China
2023	15,328
2024	20,389
2025	6,550
