= BAIC BluePark =

Chinese electric vehicle manufacturer

BAIC BluePark New Energy Technology Co., Ltd.
- Native name: 北汽蓝谷新能源科技股份有限公司
- Type: State-owned enterprise, subsidiary
- Traded as: SSE: 600733
- Industry: Automotive
- Founded: 2009; 17 years ago (As BAIC BJEV)
- Headquarters: Beijing Economic-Technological Development Area, Beijing, China
- Area served: Worldwide
- Owner: BAIC Motor (38.7%) Mercedes-Benz Investment China (2.69%)
- Parent: BAIC Group
- Website: https://www.bjev.com.cn

BAIC BluePark (Chinese: 北汽蓝谷; pinyin: BěiqìLángǔ; lit. 'North gas blue valley') is BAIC Group's subsidiary mainly engaged in the design, research and development and sales of electric automobiles. BAIC BluePark was restructured from its current subsidiary, Beijing Electric Vehicle Co., Ltd. (BAIC BJEV). The company currently operate the brands of Stelato, Arcfox and EV models of Beijing brand.

In February 2025, BAIC BluePark announced that it plans to change its company name to "BAIC Arcfox New Energy Automobile Co., Ltd."

== History ==
In 2009, the BAIC Group established a subsidiary, Beijing Electric Vehicle Co., Ltd. (BJEV). It is the first independently operated electric vehicle manufacture of China, and the enterprise in China to obtain the qualification for the production of new energy vehicles.

Between 2010 and 2014, BJEV is a subsidiary of BAIC Motor, but it was put back under direct control of BAIC Group again prior to BAIC Motor's listing. The company is renamed to Beijing New Energy Automobile Co Ltd (BAIC BJEV).

In 2018, the BAIC BJEV is set to go public through a backdoor listing on the A-share market in China. The company was renamed to "BAIC BluePark New Energy Technology Co., Ltd. (BAIC BluePark)". BAIC BJEV was reconstructed and became a subsidiary of BAIC BluePark.

In December 2019 Beijing BluePark expands an existing cooperation with global automotive supplier Magna International (based in Canada) to a full fletched joint venture, using BAIC Zhenjiang as the donor company. It was renamed as BAIC BluePark Magna Automobile and would be responsible for manufacturing premium electric vehicles under the Arcfox brand.

In September 2021, BAIC BluePark and Huawei made a joint statement, that two companies would collaborate on building intelligent electric vehicle under Arcfox brand.

In May 2022, BAIC BluePark launched the Arcfox α-S HI version under the "Huawei Inside" mode. Huawei empowers the vehicle intelligence through the supply of both software and hardware.

In August 2023, BAIC BluePark issued an announcement that it would extend cooperation with Huawei Consumer Business Group to build a high-end intelligent electric sedan.

In December 2023, according to an announcement made by the China National Intellectual Property Administration (CNIPA), Huawei has transferred multiple trademarks called "STELATO" to BAIC BJEV, the English name of the Huawei-BAIC collaboration brand under Harmony Intelligent Mobility Alliance (HIMA), similar to AITO and Luxeed.

In March 2024, BAIC BluePark announced that the BAIC Group, its controlling shareholder, entrusted all the voting rights and shares of BAIC BluePark to BAIC Motor. After this share trusteeship, BAIC Motor actually controls approximately 38.70% of the voting rights of BAIC BluePark and the direct controlling shareholder are changed from BAIC Group to BAIC Motor. The company will still be indirectly controlled by BAIC Group, and the actual controller of the company are still the State-owned Assets Supervision and Administration Commission of Beijing Municipal Government.

== Products ==
=== Arcfox ===
Arcfox (极狐汽车) is BAIC's premium EV brand operated by BAIC BluePark, established in 2017.

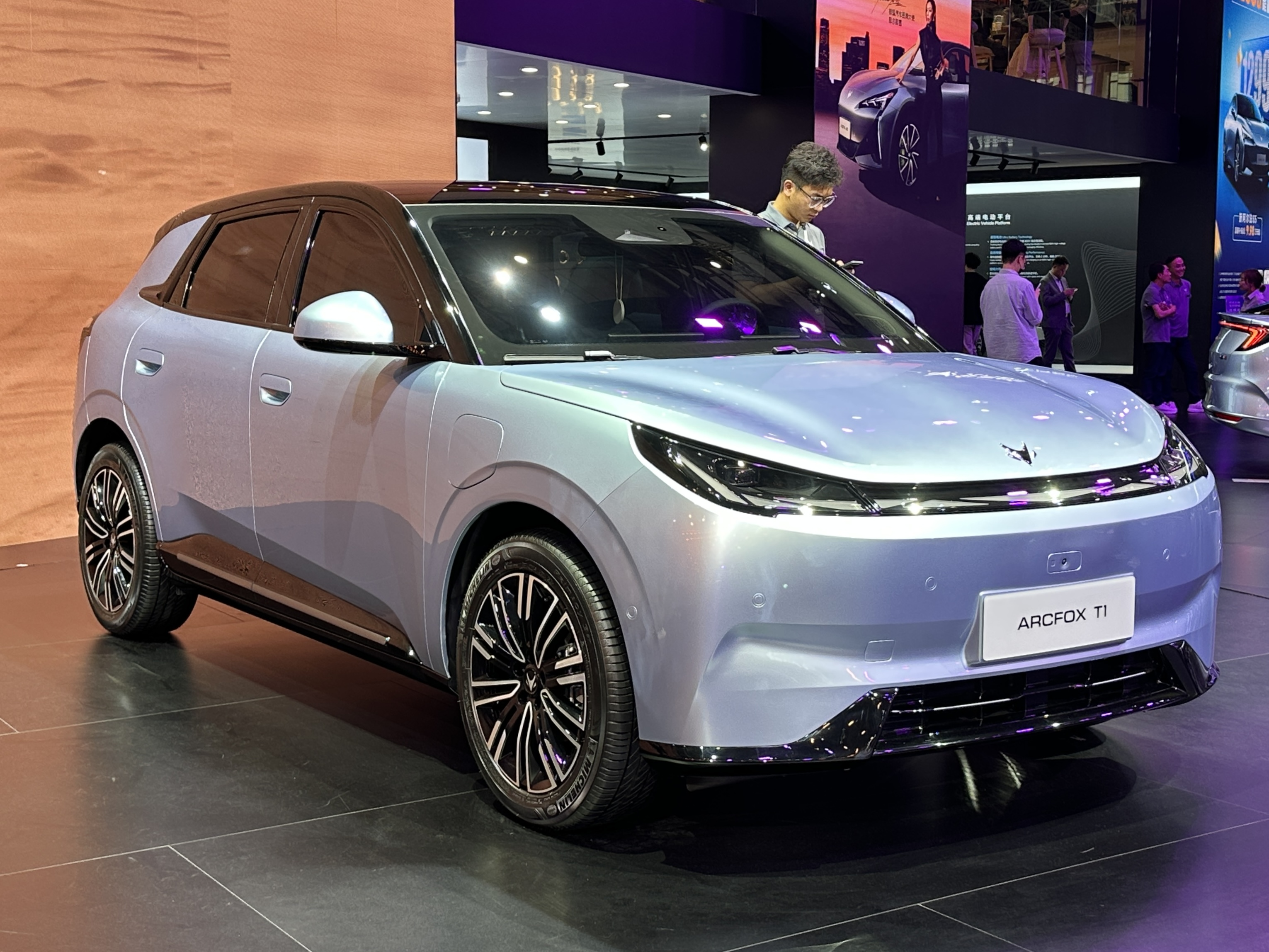
Arcfox T1

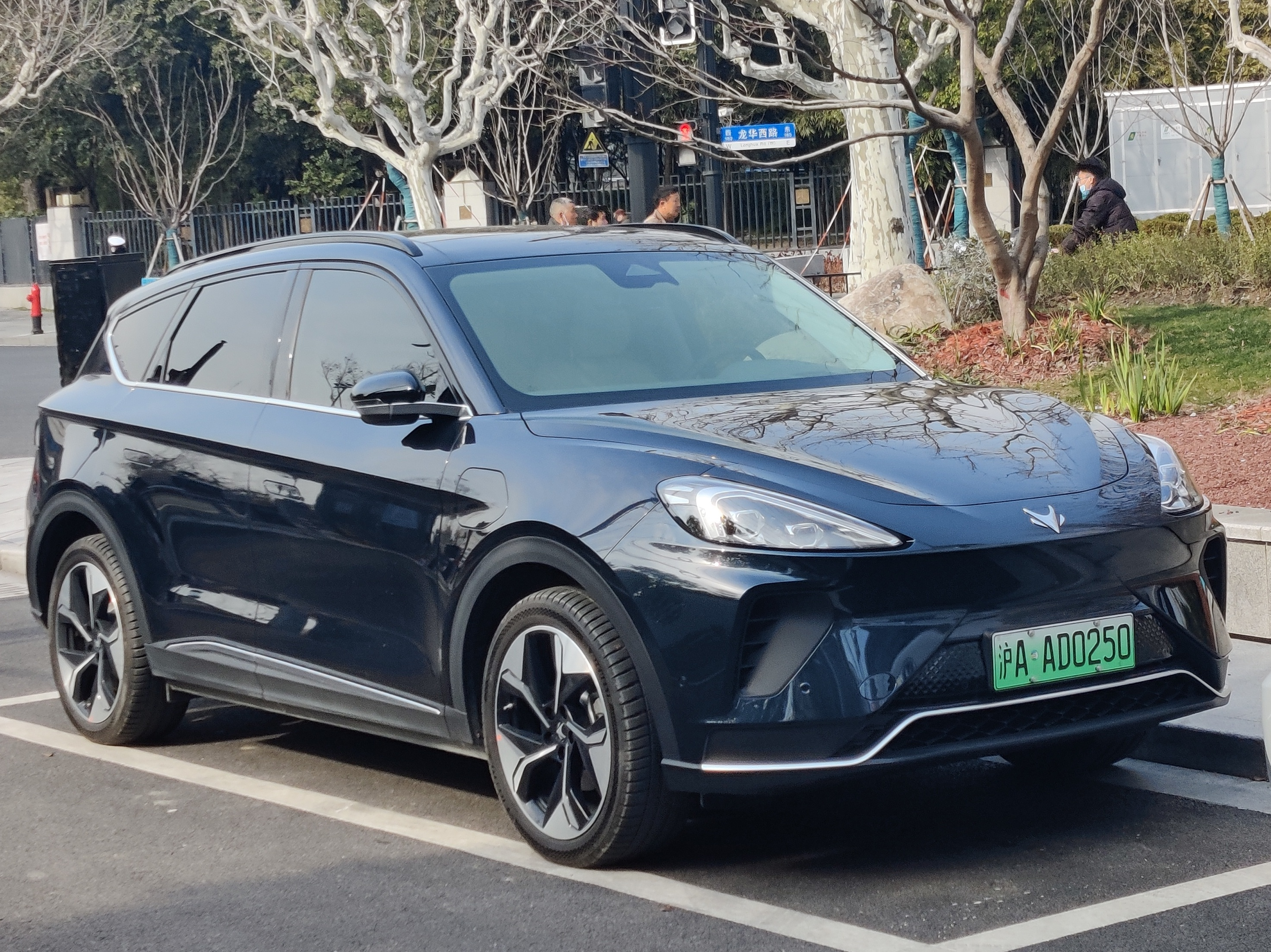
Arcfox αT6

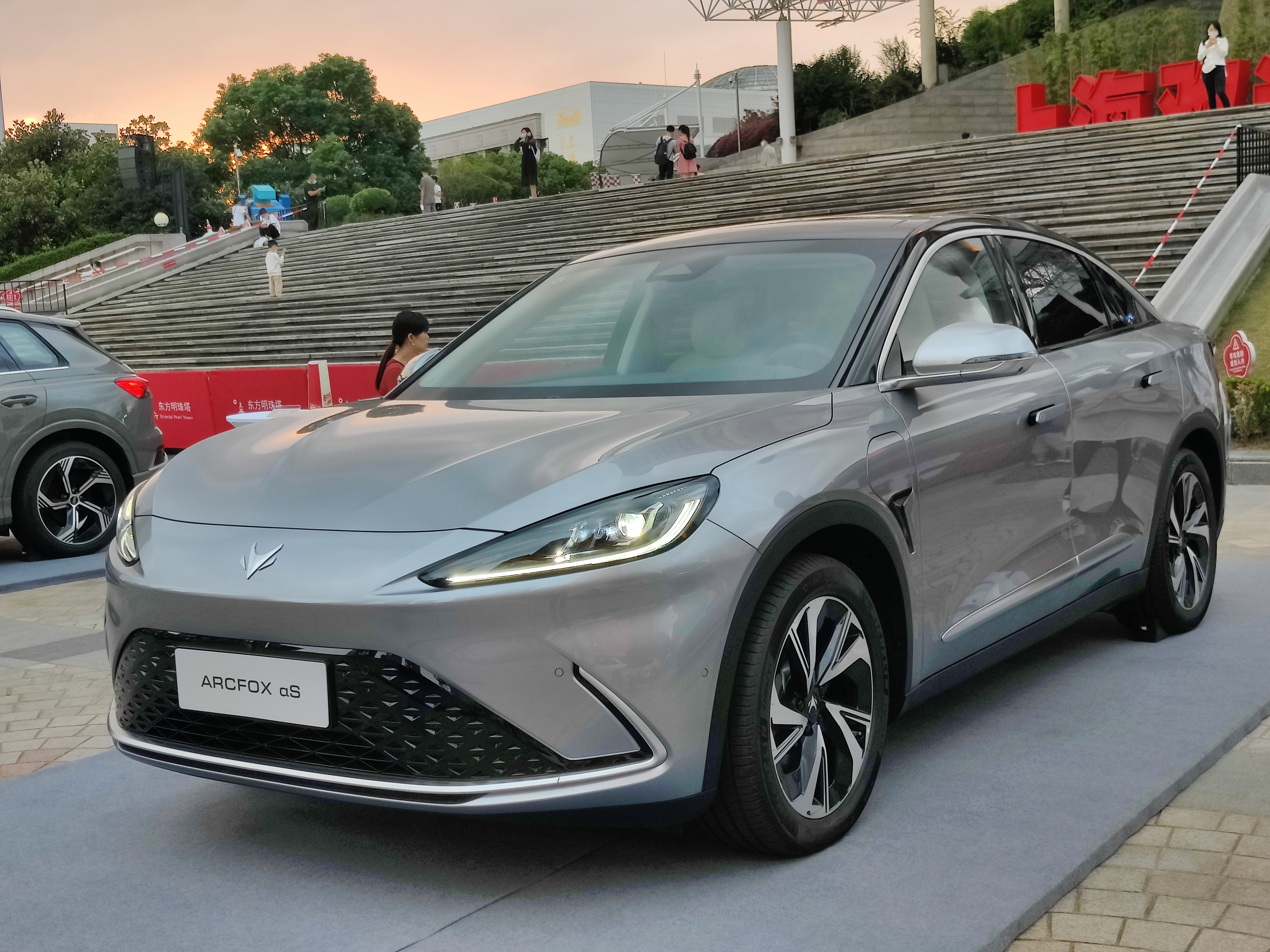
Arcfox αS6

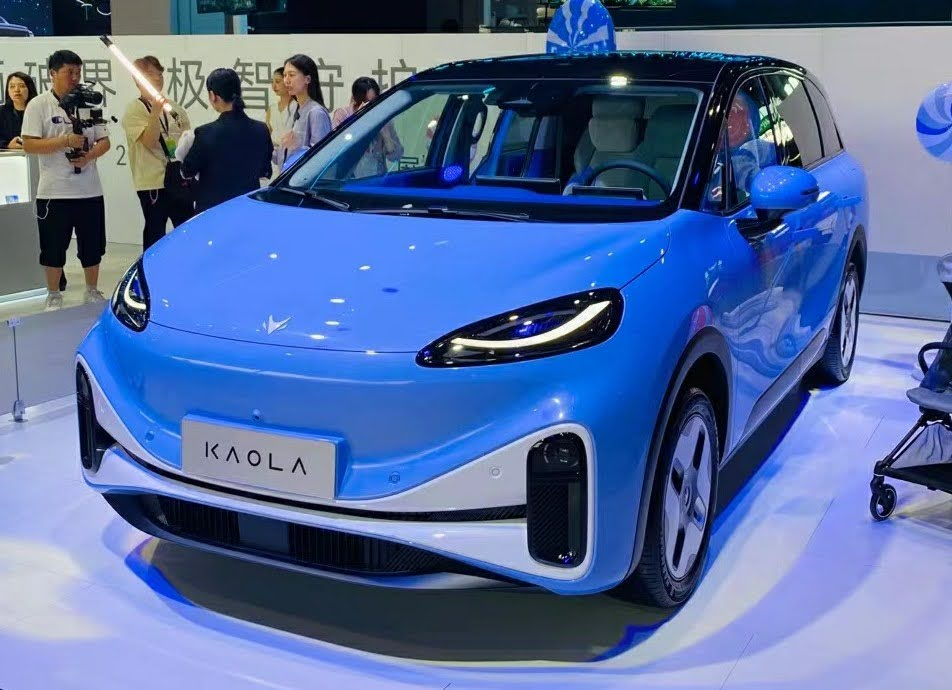
Arcfox Kaola

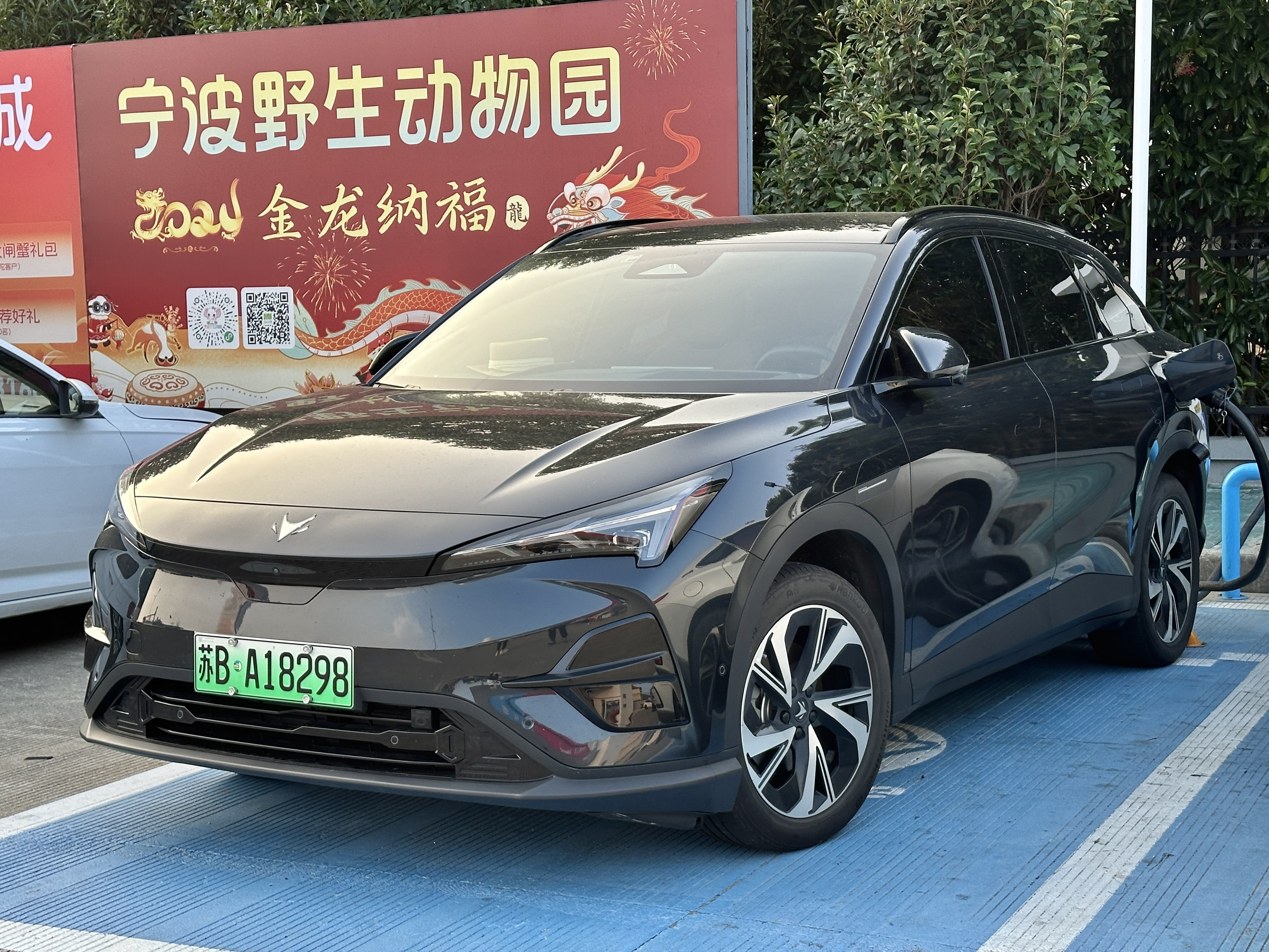
Arcfox αT5

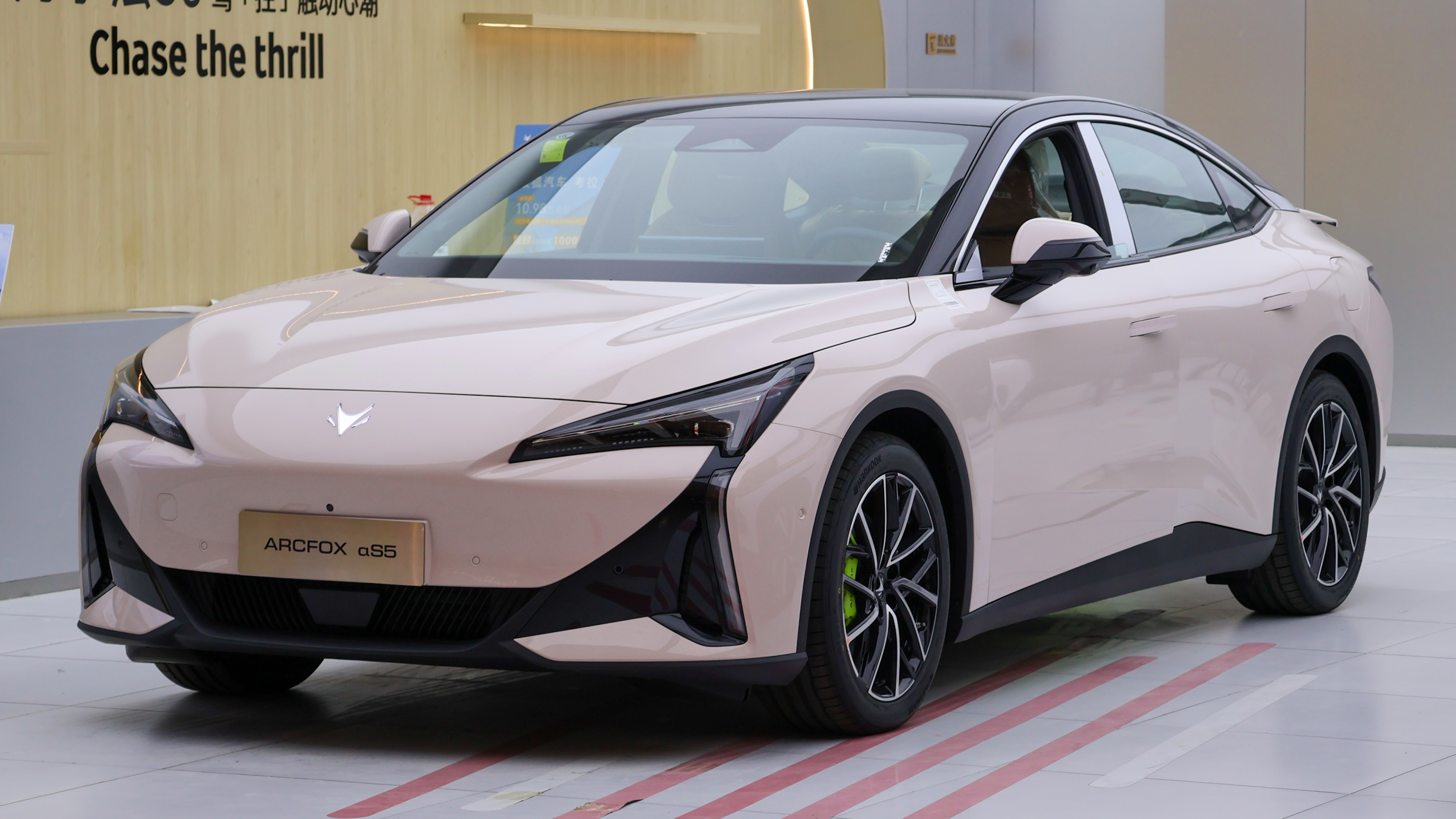
Arcfox αS5

=== Stelato ===
Stelato (Chinese: 享界) is the brand Huawei collaborates with BAIC BluePark, a subsidiary of BAIC Group.

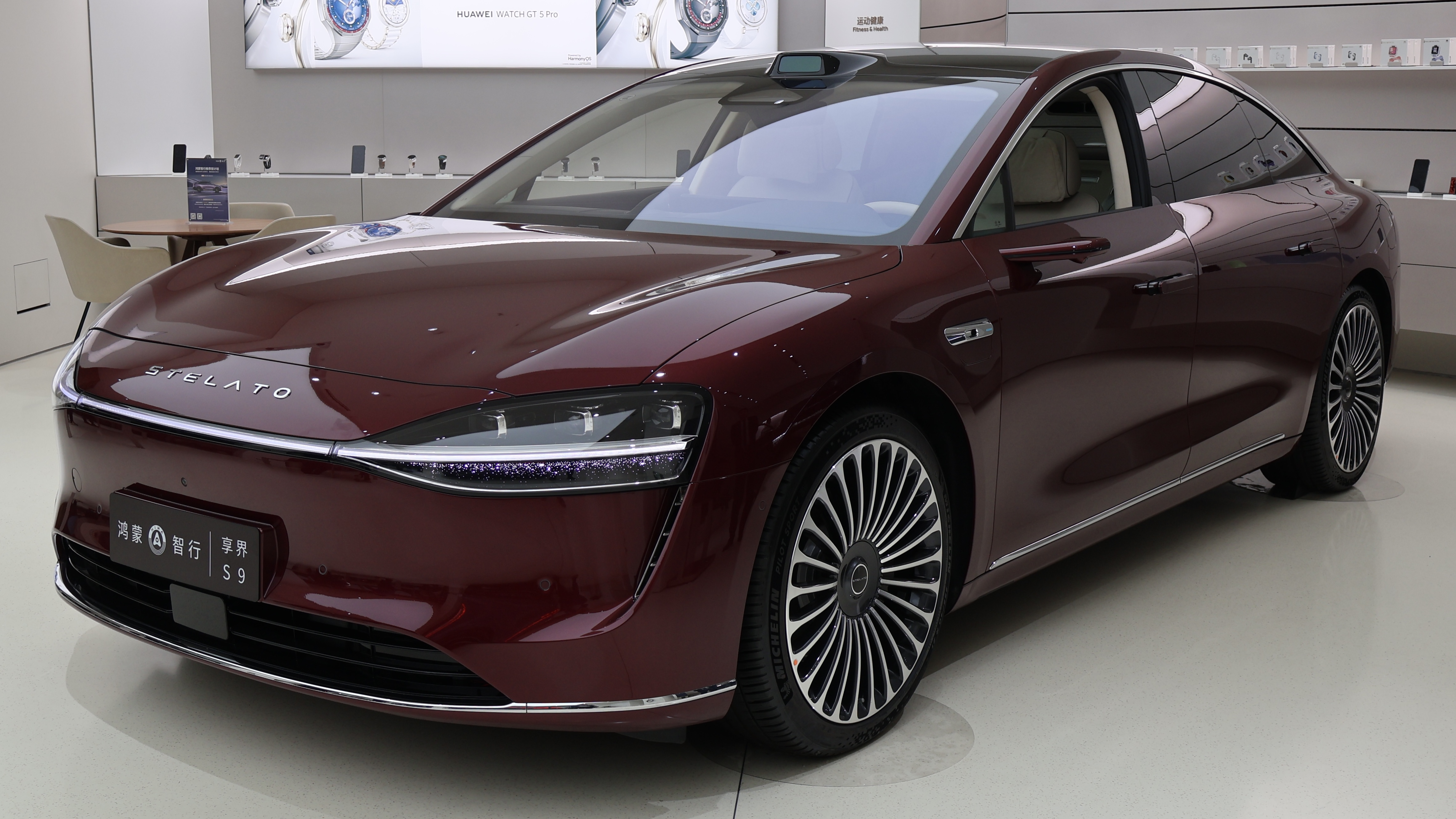
Stelato S9

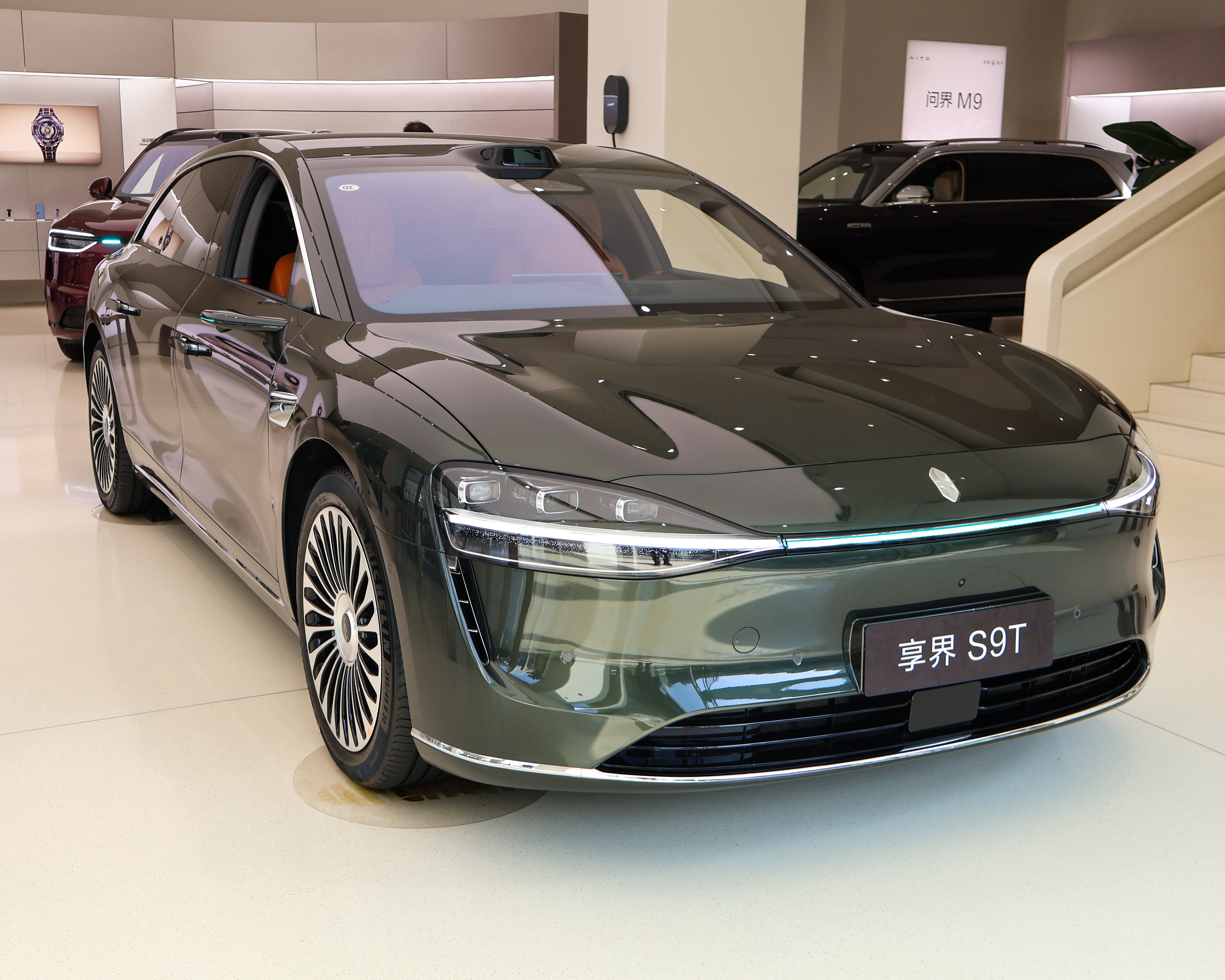
Stelato S9T

=== BJEV/Beijing (EV models) ===
With the Beijing Electric Vehicle Co., Ltd. (BAIC BJEV) was reconsolidated into BAIC BluePark, the battery electric vehicle of Beijing brand, like Beijing EU5, Beijing EU7, are also operated by BAIC BluePark at present.

==== Current Beijing (EV models) ====
- Beijing EU8 (2026–present), mid-size sedan, BEV

==== Discontinued BJEV models ====
- BJEV EV (2013–2017), subcompact car, EV variant of Senova D20
- Beijing EC5/BJEV EX (2016–2019), subcompact SUV, EV variant of Senova X25
- BJEV EH (2016–2019), mid-size car, EV variant of Senova D70
- BJEV EU (2016–2019), compact car, EV variant of Senova D50
- Beijing EU7 (2019–2025), mid-size sedan, EV variant of Beijing U7
- Beijing EU5 (2018–2025), compact sedan, EV variant of Beijing U5
- BJEV EC (2016–2020), subcompact car
- Beijing EX3 (2018–2022), subcompact SUV
- Beijing EX5 (2019–2025), compact SUV, PHEV variant of Beijing X5
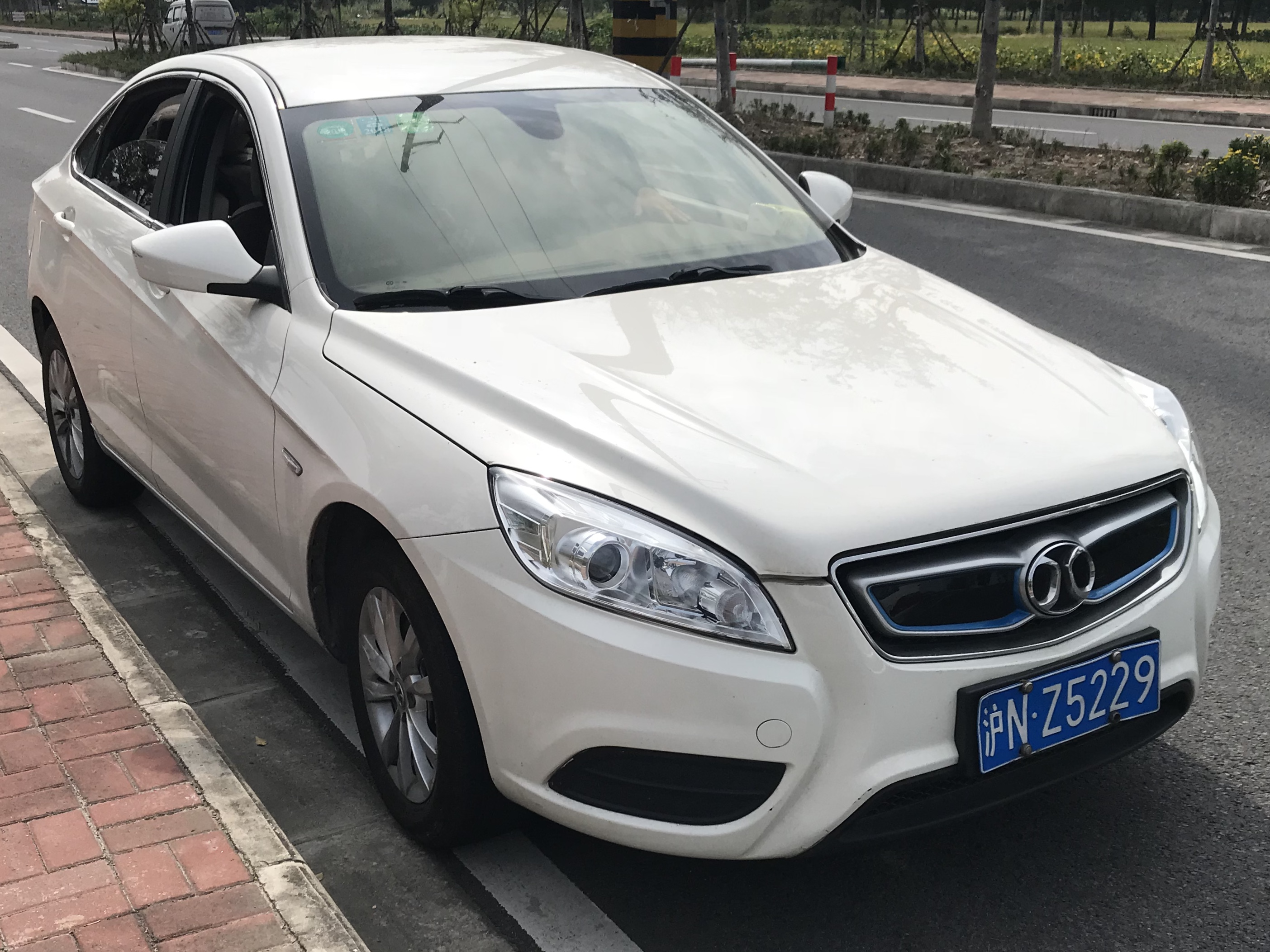
Beijing EU

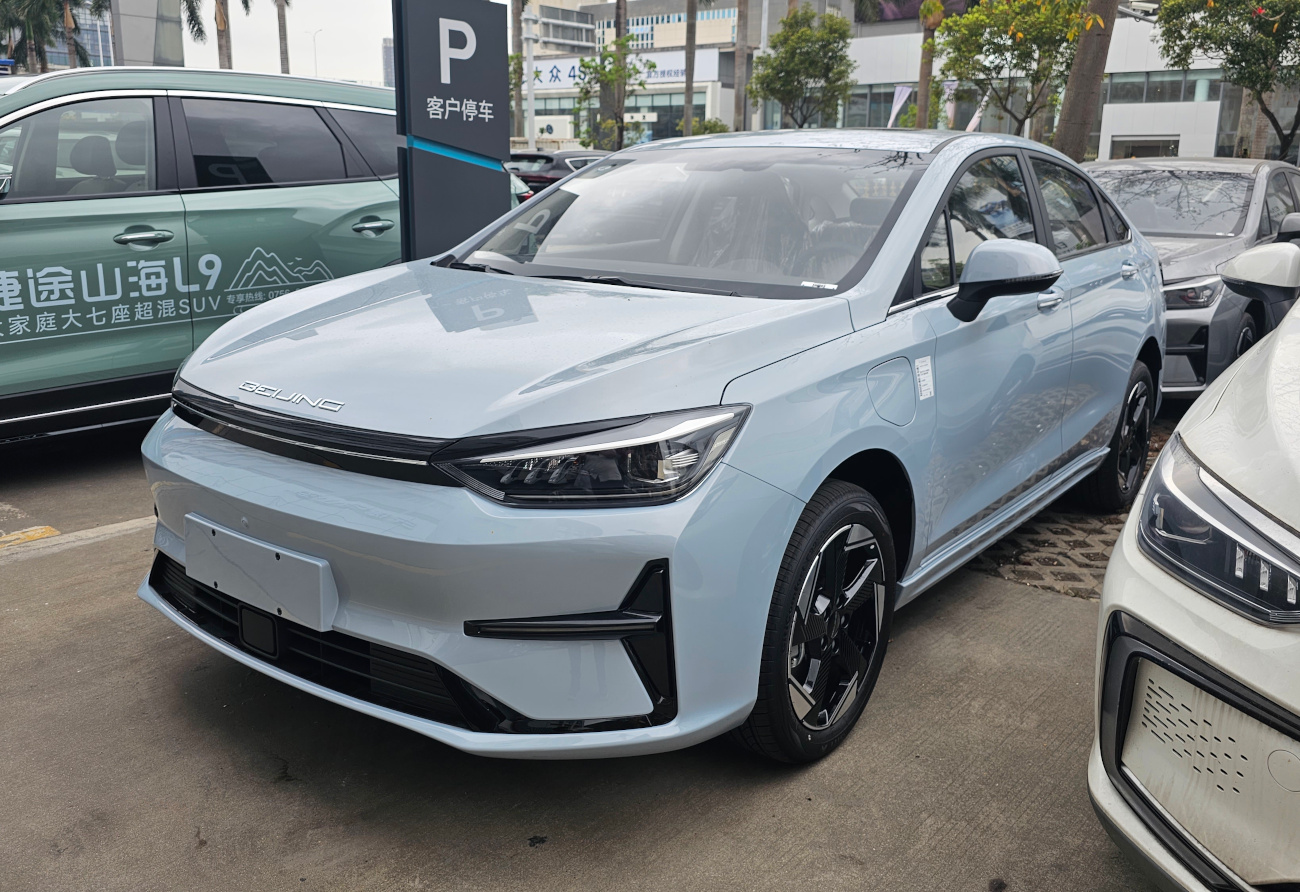
Beijing EU5

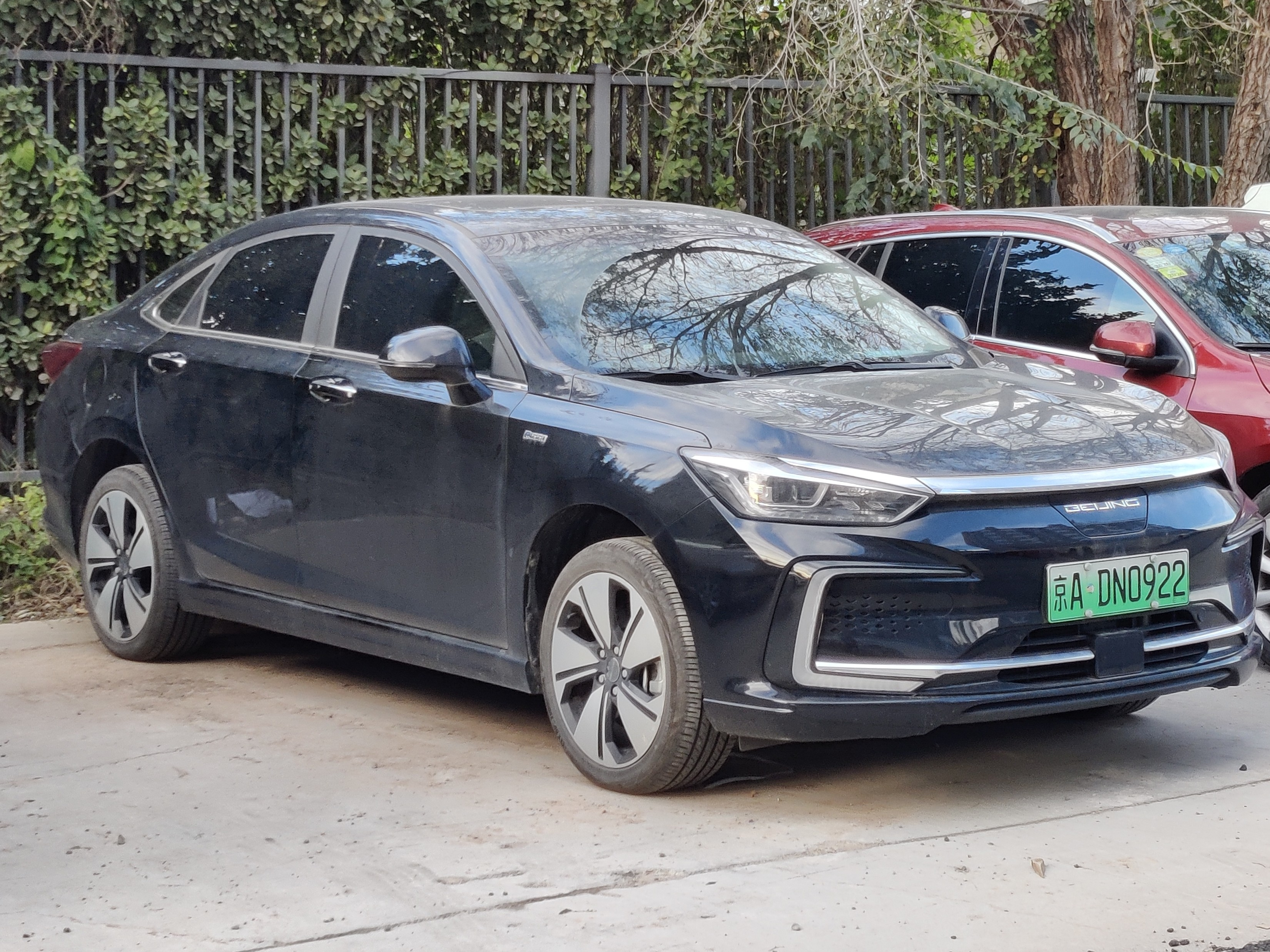
Beijing EU7

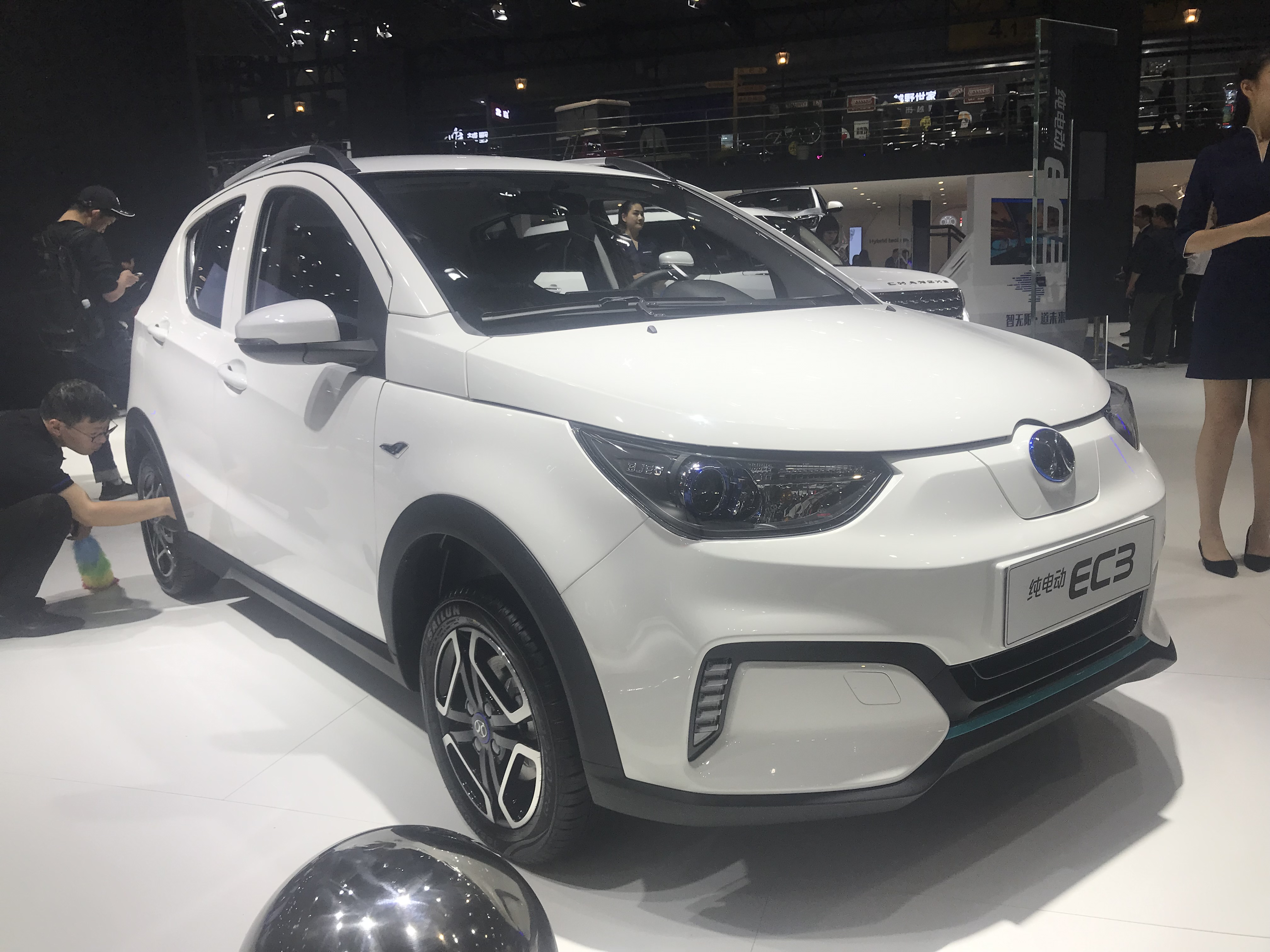
Beijing EC3/EC

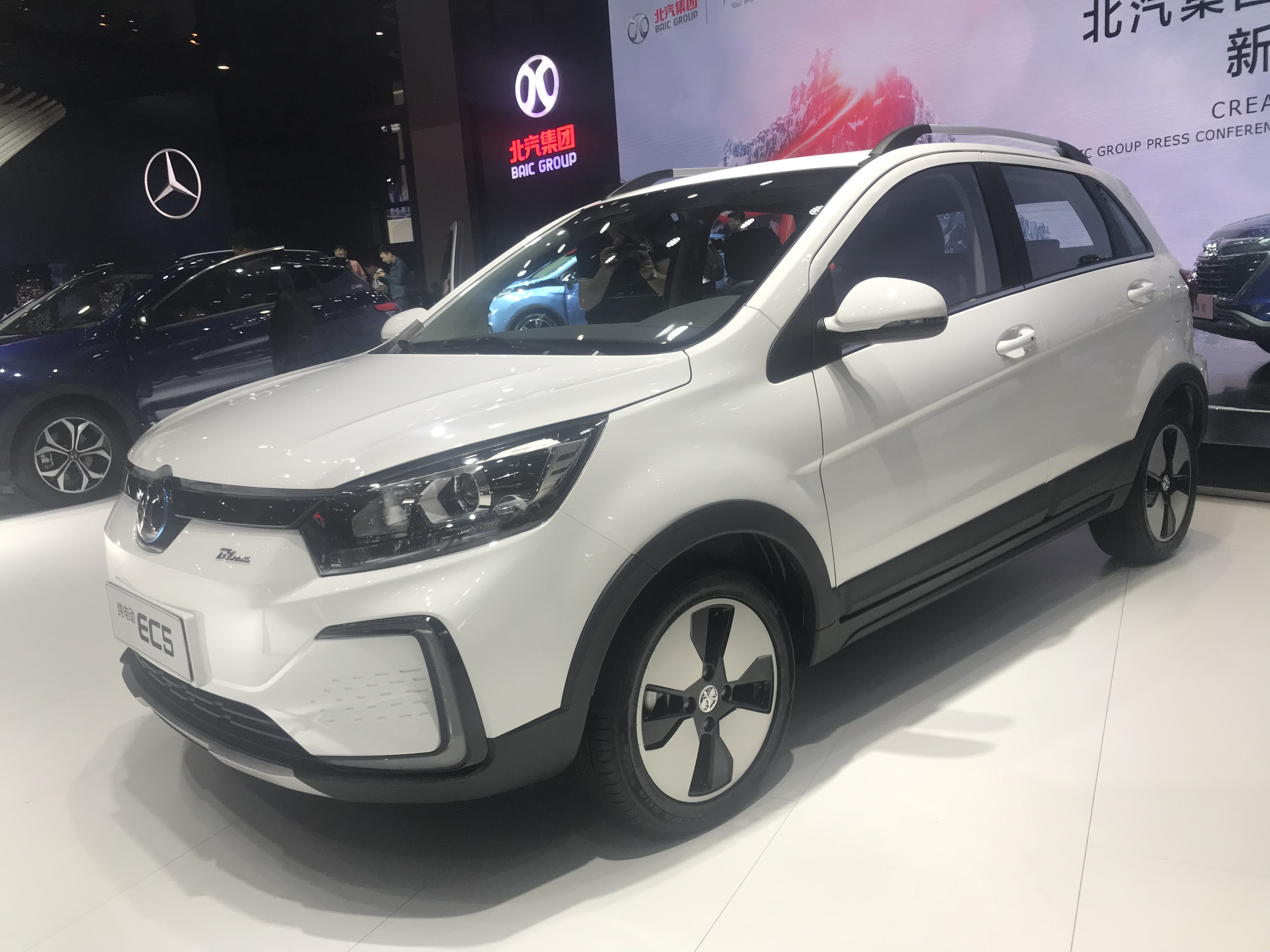
Beijing EC5/EX

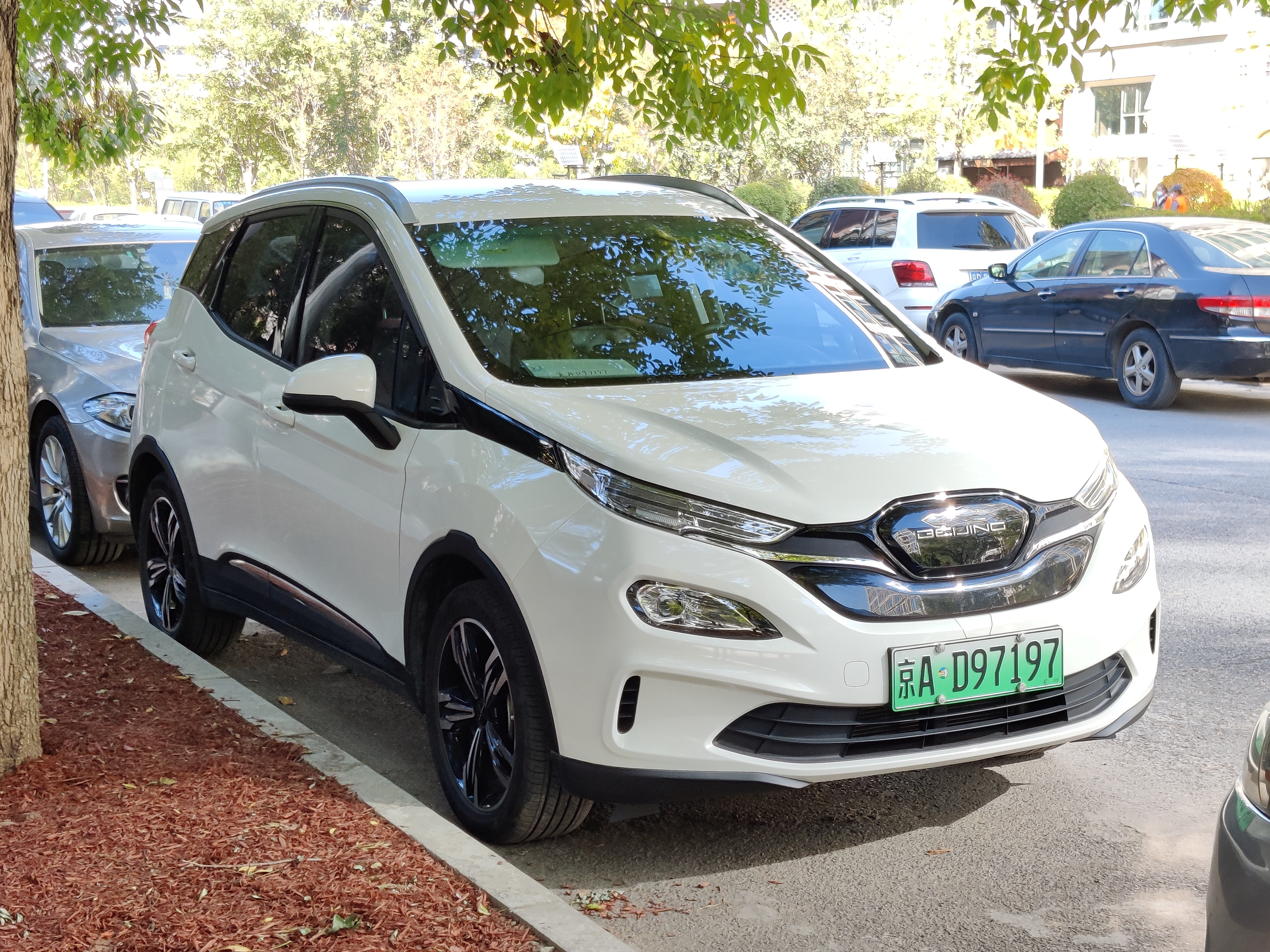
Beijing EX3

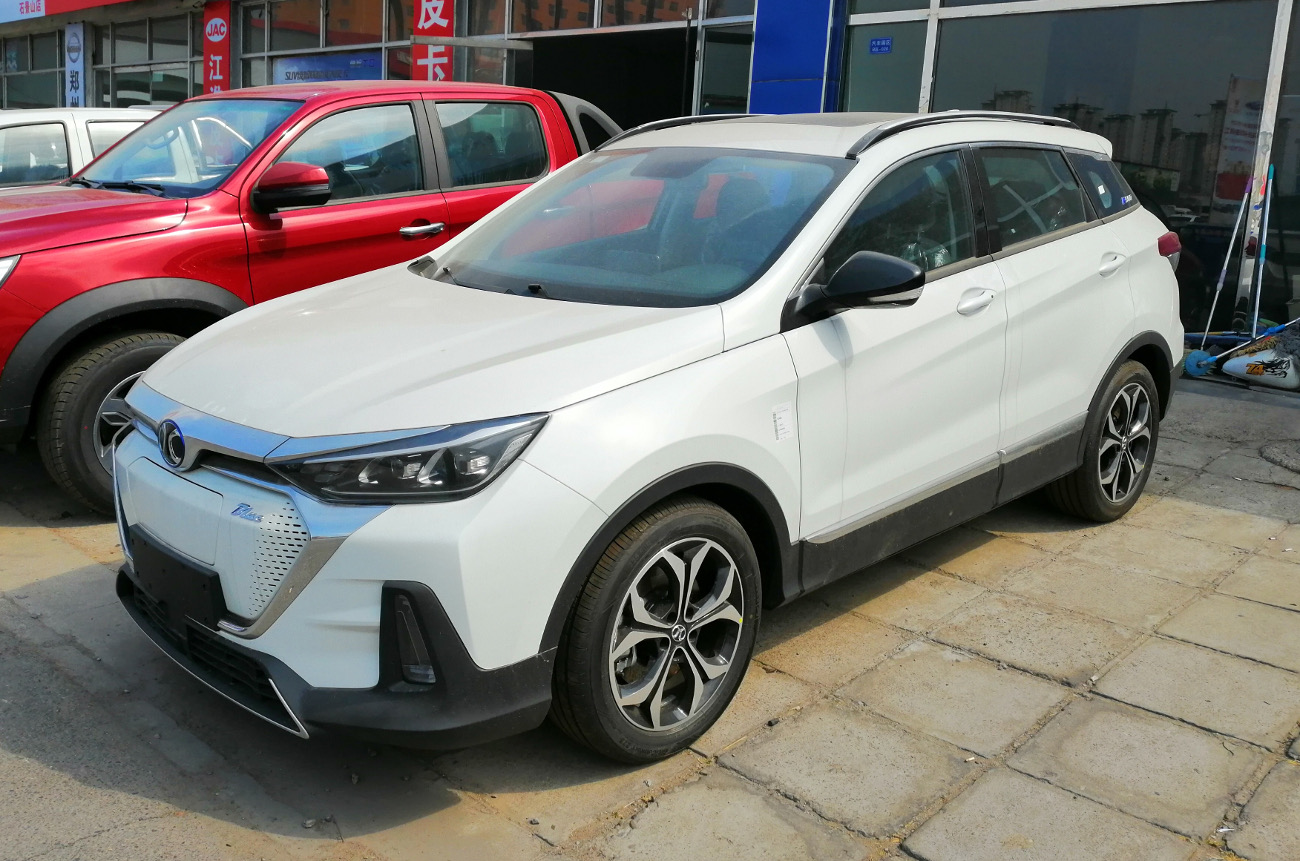
Beijing EX5

== See also ==
- Automobile manufacturers and brands of China
- List of automobile manufacturers of China
