= EC3 =

EC3 can refer to:

== People ==
- Ethan Carter III (EC3) (born 1983), American professional wrestler

== Places ==
- EC3, a district in the London EC postcode area

== Groups, organizations, companies ==
- European Cybercrime Centre
- EarthCheck, formerly EC3 Global; international tourism advisory group

== Transportation ==
- BJEV EC3, a Chinese electric vehicle
- KUR EC3 class, a class of steam locomotive
- EC-3 radar, Italian WWII radar

== Other uses ==
- Dolby Digital Plus, also known as EC-3
- Hydrolase enzymes (EC 3); see List of EC numbers (EC 3)
- Eurocup-3, a formula racing series

== See also ==
- ECCC (disambiguation)
