= EX3 =

EX3 or EX-3 may refer to:

== Arts, media, and entertainment ==
- EX-3, a Spanish mákina band
- The Expendables 3, a 2014 American action film
- Street Fighter EX3, a 2000 head-to-head fighting game

== Automobiles ==
- Beijing EX3, a 2018–present Chinese subcompact electric crossover
- Geometry EX3, a 2021–present Chinese subcompact electric crossover
- Kandi EX3, a 2017–present Chinese subcompact electric crossover
- Peugeot EX3, a 1912–1914 French race car
- Toyota EX-III, a 1969 Japanese concept car

== Other uses ==
- EX3, a postcode district in the EX postcode area in England
