= Arcfox Alpha T5 =

Compact crossover SUV

Arcfox αT5
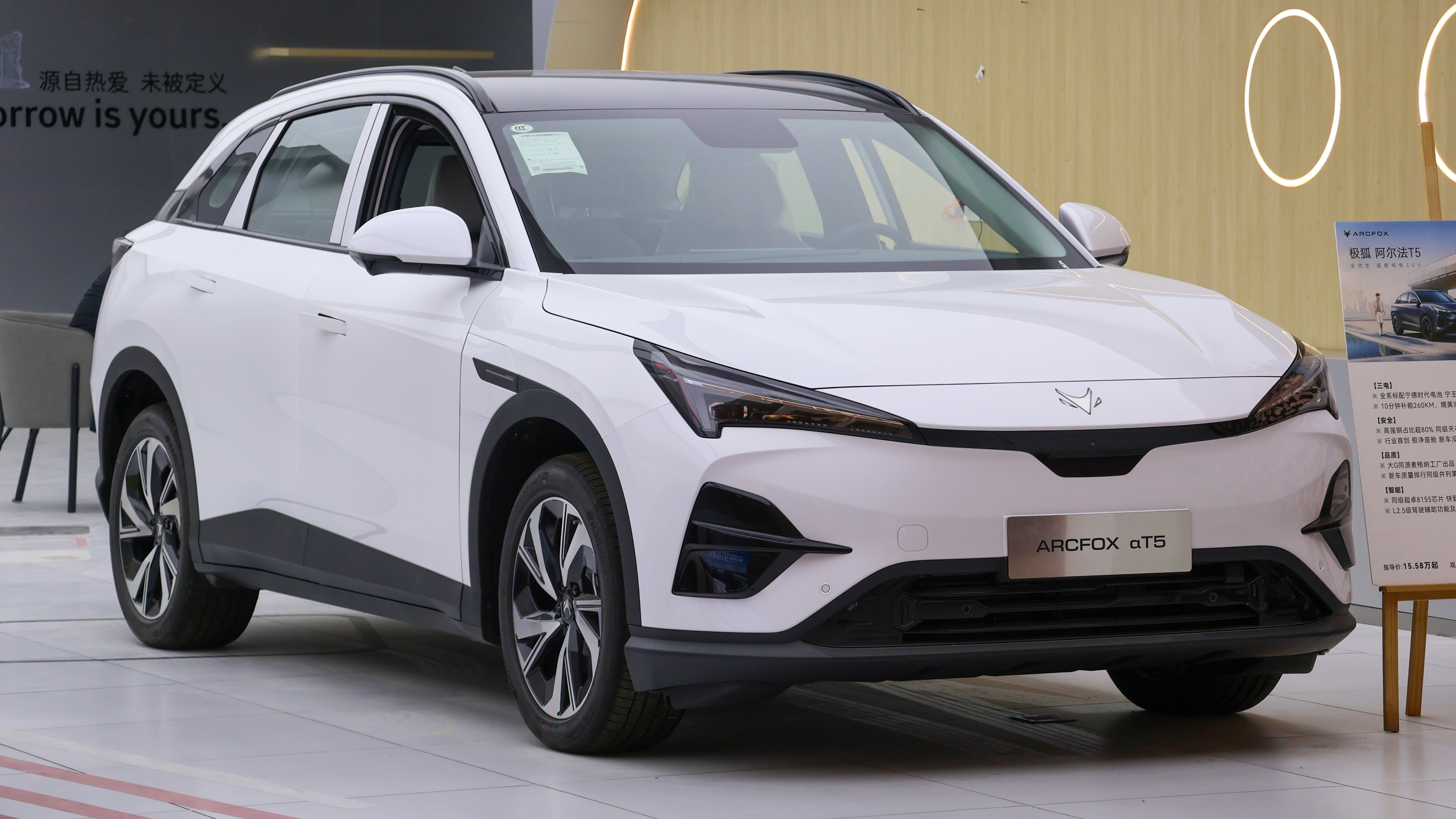

Overview
- Manufacturer: Arcfox (BAIC Group)
- Production: 2024–present
- Assembly: China: Zhenjiang

Body and chassis
- Class: Compact crossover SUV
- Body style: 5-door SUV
- Layout: Front-motor, front-wheel drive; Front engine, rear-motor, rear-wheel drive

Powertrain
- Engine: Petrol range extender: 1.5 L A156A1 I4
- Electric motor: Permanent magnet synchronous
- Power output: 185–200 kW (248–268 hp; 252–272 PS)
- Transmission: 1-speed direct-drive reduction
- Battery: 27.4 kWh Freevoy LFP CATL; 64.8 kWh LFP CATL; 74.4 kWh LFP CATL; 79.2 kWh NMC CATL
- Range: 1,070 km (665 mi) (EREV, WLTP)
- Electric range: 520–660 km (323–410 mi) (EV, CLTC); 163 km (101 mi) (EREV, WLTP); 215 km (134 mi) (EREV, CLTC)
- Plug-in charging: DC: 215-370 kW (EV)

Dimensions
- Wheelbase: 2,845 mm (112.0 in)
- Length: 4,690 mm (184.6 in); 4,760 mm (187.4 in) (2026)
- Width: 1,936 mm (76.2 in)
- Height: 1,650 mm (65.0 in)
- Curb weight: 1,955–2,025 kg (4,310–4,464 lb)

The Arcfox αT5 (Chinese: 极狐阿尔法T5) is a battery electric and range extender compact crossover SUV manufactured by BAIC under the Arcfox brand.

== Overview ==
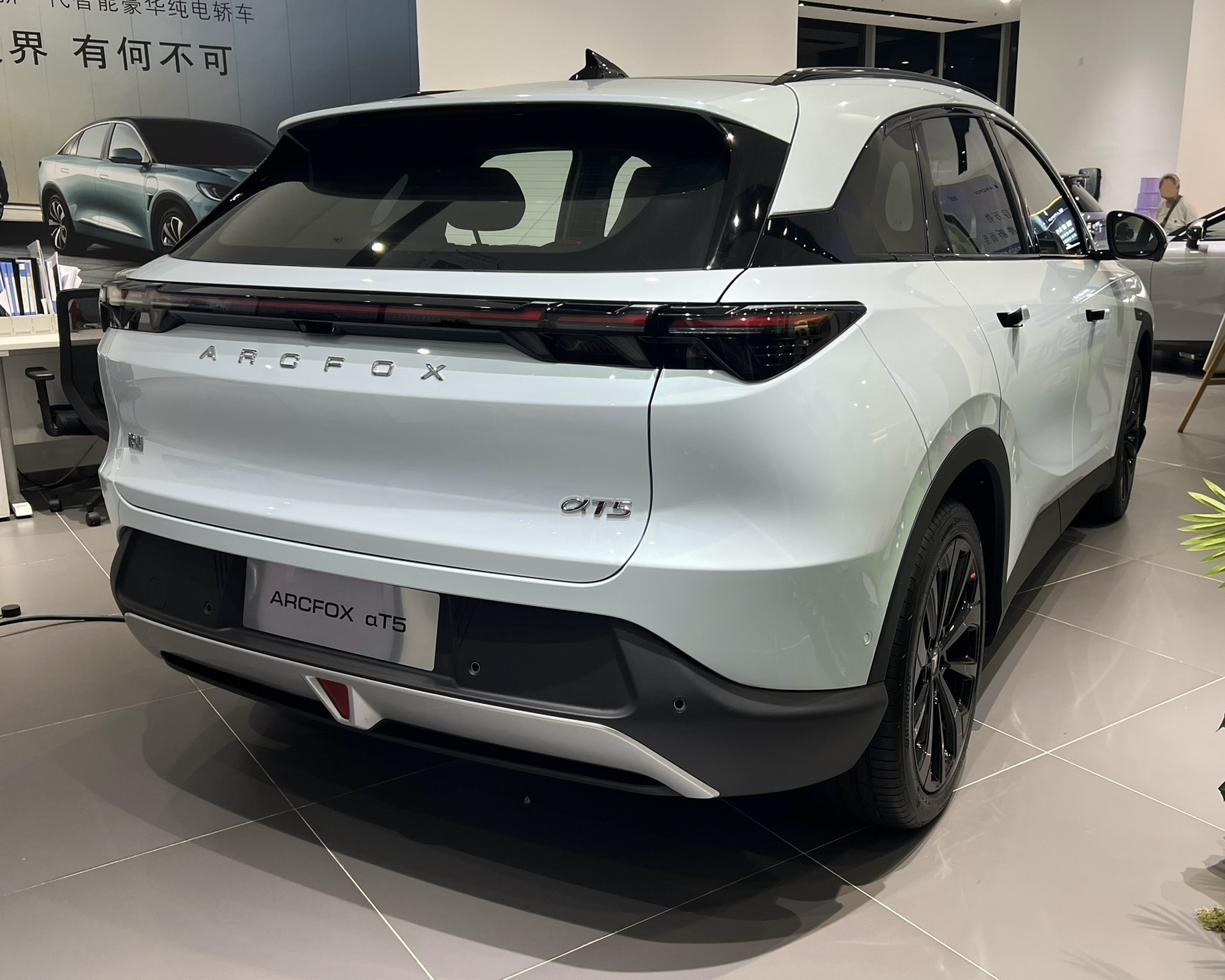
Rear view

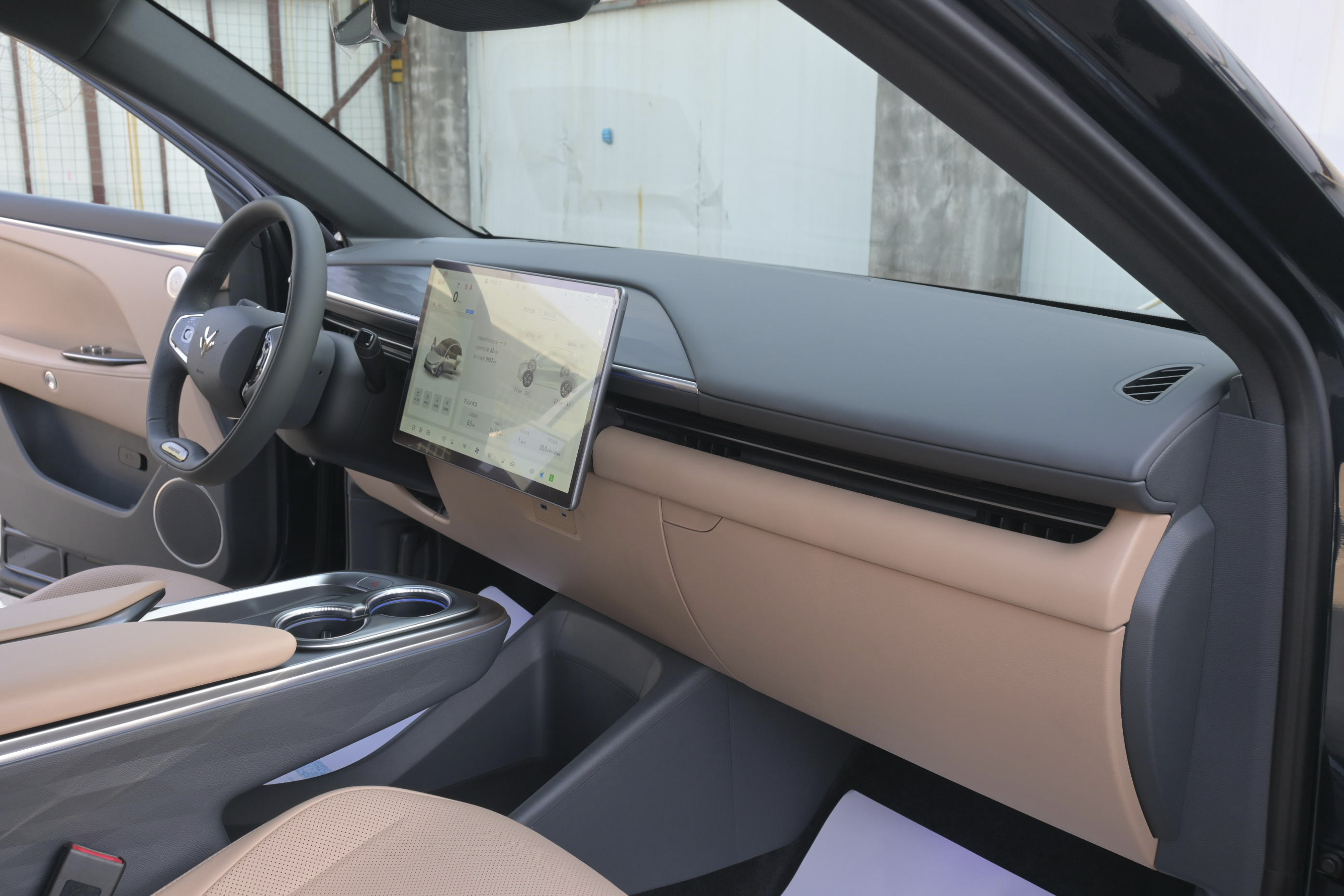
Interior

In late 2023, Chinese electric carmaker Arcfox introduced another model to expand its portfolio of smaller, more affordable vehicles. The αT5 slots below the Alpha-T. In October 2025, Arcfox released a refreshed version of the αT5, which sees the existing EV versions gain range alongside the addition of a debuting range-extender powertrain option. It gains 70 mm (2.8 in) in length but all other dimensions remain the same. Additionally, it features the debuting Yuanjing Intelligent Driving and Cabin software developed in-house by BAIC New Energy.

It has a silhouette rich in sharp lines and clearly outlined embossments. Aggressively shaped headlights were connected by a small crossbar, and the bumper was expanded by large air intakes. The slim silhouette was diversified by retractable door handles, while the rear part of the body was dominated by a high-set light strip and extensive embossments. The EV version has a drag coefficient of 0.243 C_{d}, while the range extender version is 0.268 C_{d}.

The passenger compartment has been kept in a simple, minimalist design. The high-set center tunnel has been detached from the cockpit, gaining an expanded lower storage compartment. The dashboard is dominated by only one, central touchscreen. It serves as both the clocks and the multimedia system with a diagonal of 15.6 inches.

Higher end variants are equipped with a Level 2 ADAS system powered by a Qualcomm Snapdragon 8775 SoC.

=== 2025 update ===
In 2025, the αT5 received a new range-extender powertrain option and updates to the existing EV powertrains which increased range while keeping battery and motor specifications identical. The 64.8 kWh, 74.4 kWh, and 79.2 kWh models' ranges increased from 520, 630, and 660 km (320, 390, and 410 mi) to 560, 660, and 705 km (348, 410, and 438 mi), respectively.

The αT5 is the first Arcfox model to receive a range-extender system, known as the BAIC Shenqing system. It uses a naturally aspirated 1.5-liter inline-four petrol engine, which outputs 103 hp (77 kW; 104 PS) at 6,000 rpm and 132 N⋅m (97 lb⋅ft) of torque at 4,500 rpm. It has a compression ratio of 14:1 and is equipped with port injection, resulting in a claimed peak thermal efficiency of 40% or a petrol to electricity conversion rate of 3.5 kWh/L (13.25 kWh/gal). It is equipped with a CATL-supplied 27.4 kWh Freevoy LFP battery pack and a rear motor outputting 268 hp (200 kW; 272 PS) and 365 N⋅m (269 lb⋅ft) of torque. It achieves a pure electric range of 163 and 215 km (101 and 134 mi) on the WLTP and CLTC cycles, respectively, and total range of 1,070 and 1,215 km (665 and 755 mi) on WLTP and CLTC, respectively. Arcfox says that the system's power generation is 95% efficient and the electric drive efficiency is 98%. It is capable of a 0–100 km/h (62 mph) acceleration time of 6.5 seconds with a charged battery or 7.6 seconds when the battery is low. It can charge from 30–80% in 15 minutes, or 10–80% in 21 minutes.

Arcfox αT5 2025 (facelift)

Rear view

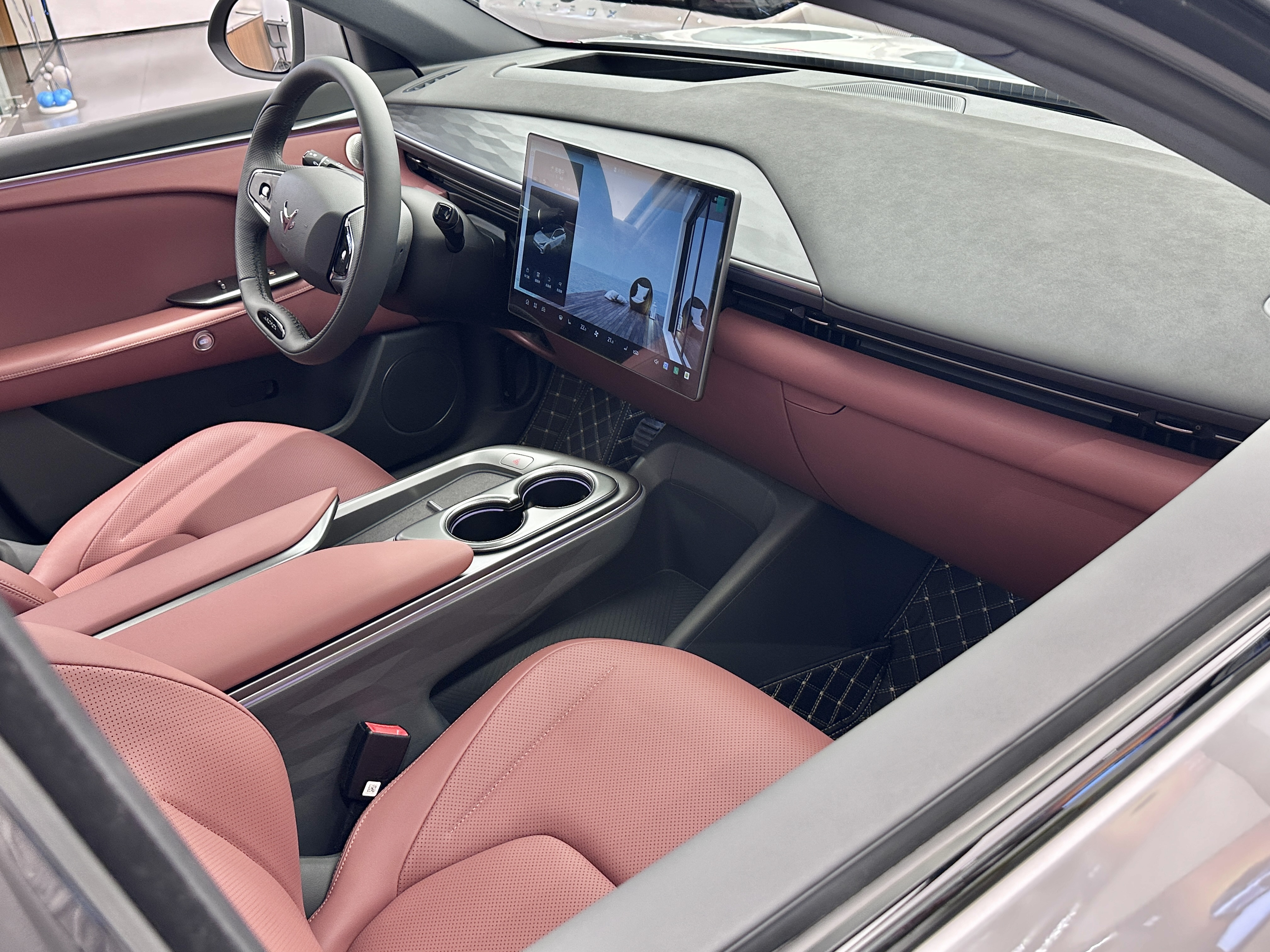
Interior

== Specifications ==
The αT5 is an electric car, whose drive system is made up of two motors to choose from. The weaker one producing 185 kW (248 hp) and 360 N⋅m (266 ft⋅lb) of torque, and the more powerful one - 200 kW (268 hp) and 360 N⋅m (266 ft⋅lb) of torque. The first one was combined with a 64.8 kWh battery manufactured by CATL, which offered a range of up to 520 kilometres (323 mi) according to the CLTC standard, while the second gained a 79.2 kWh battery and up to 660 kilometres (410 mi) of CLTC range.

== Safety ==
C-NCAP (2021) test results 2024 Arcfox αT5 660 Max
Category		%
Overall:	5.5 /5 stars	92.7%
Occupant protection:		96.39%
Vulnerable road users:		75.99%
Active safety:		93.71%

== Sales ==
Year	China		
Year	EV	EREV	Total
2023	1,018	—	1,018
2024	37,107	—	37,107
2025	38,606	1,319	39,925
