= BJEV EC3 =

Chinese automobile

Beijing EC3
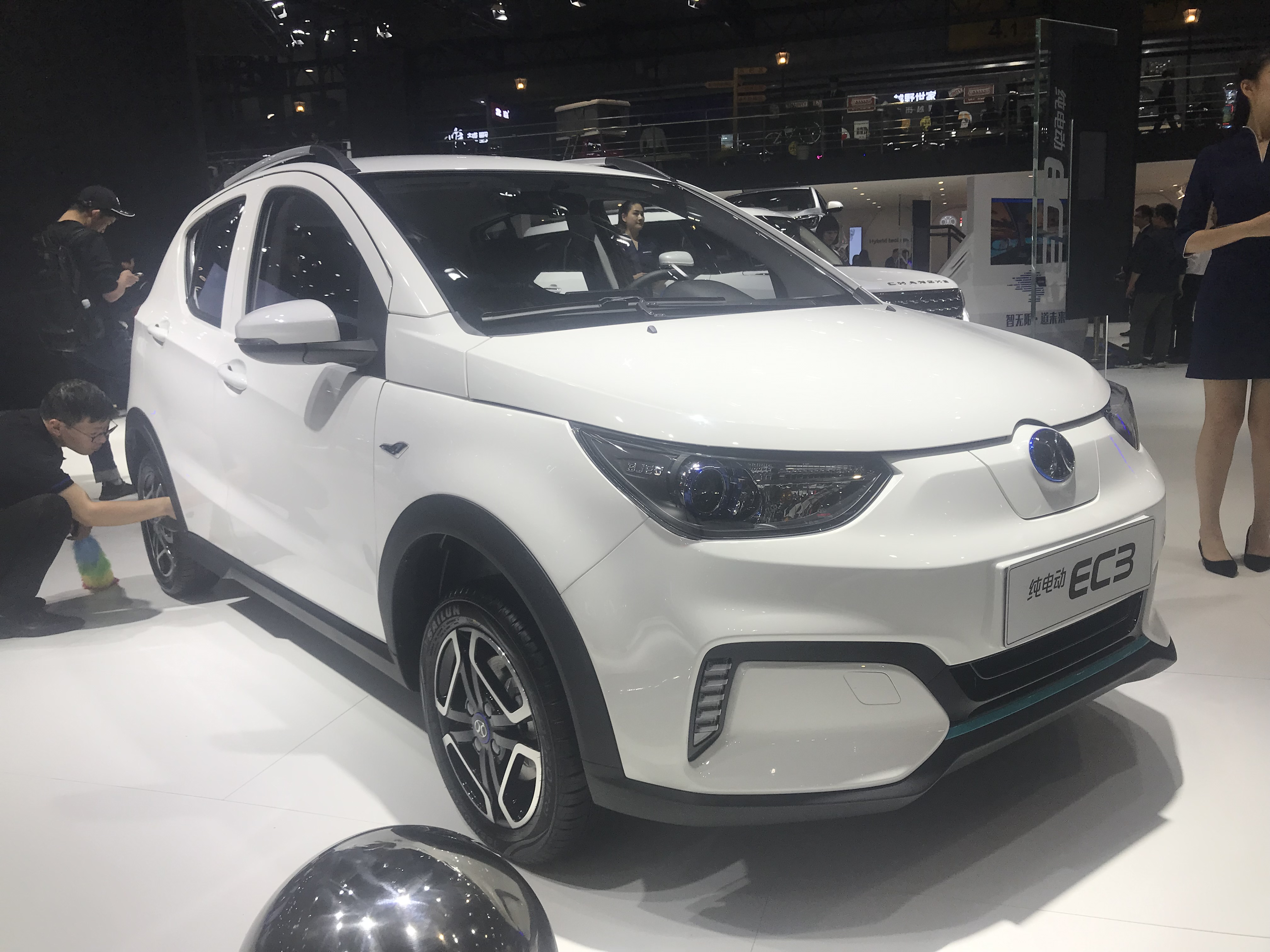

Overview
- Manufacturer: BAIC Group
- Also called: Beijing EC-180; Beijing EC-200
- Production: 2016–2020

Body and chassis
- Class: Supermini
- Body style: 5-door hatchback
- Layout: electric car

Dimensions
- Wheelbase: 2,360 mm (92.9 in)
- Length: 3,672 mm (144.6 in)
- Width: 1,630 mm (64.2 in)
- Height: 1,495 mm (58.9 in)
- Kerb weight: 1,085 kg

The Beijing EC3 is an all-electric car manufactured by BAIC Motor Electric Vehicle Co Ltd. The maker is a wholly owned subsidiary of BAIC Group. The BJEV EC180 made its first public appearance at the 2016 Guangzhou Auto Show in China and, as of November 2016, was to be launched on the Chinese auto market in the first quarter of 2017. It was originally BJEV EC180 from the BJEV EC series.

== Specifications ==
=== EC180 ===
The BJEV EC180 is the entry product of the BJEV brand. Price including subsidies ranges from 49,800 yuan to 55,800 yuan. It has an electric motor producing 31 kW (41 hp) and 140 N⋅m (103 lb⋅ft) of torque. The BJEV EC180 has a 20.3 kWh battery pack giving a range of 180 kilometers. Top speed is 100 kilometers per hour and a full charge on 220V takes seven hours.

The BJEV EC180 was available as part of the EvCard electric car-sharing service in China.

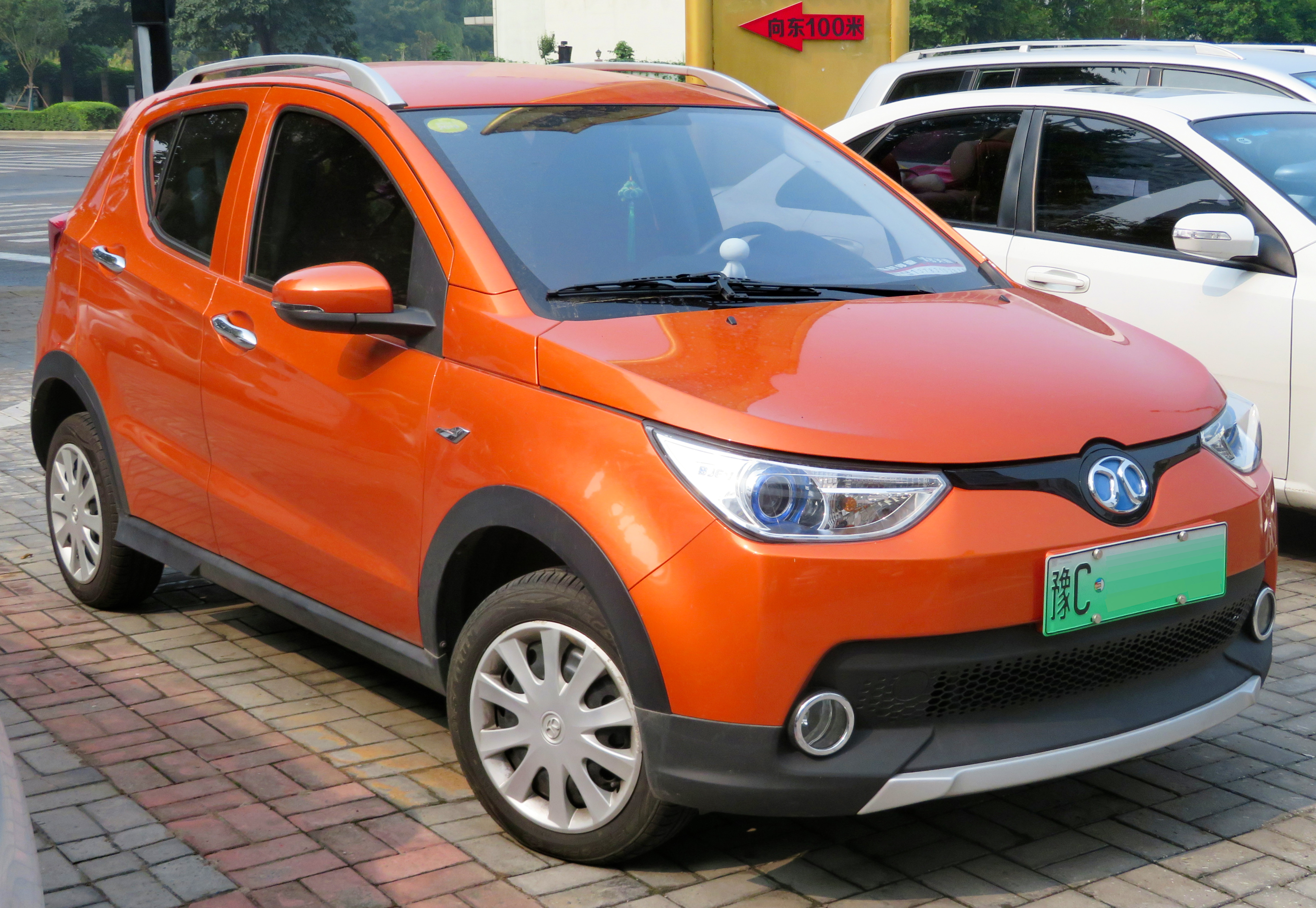
Beijing EC-200

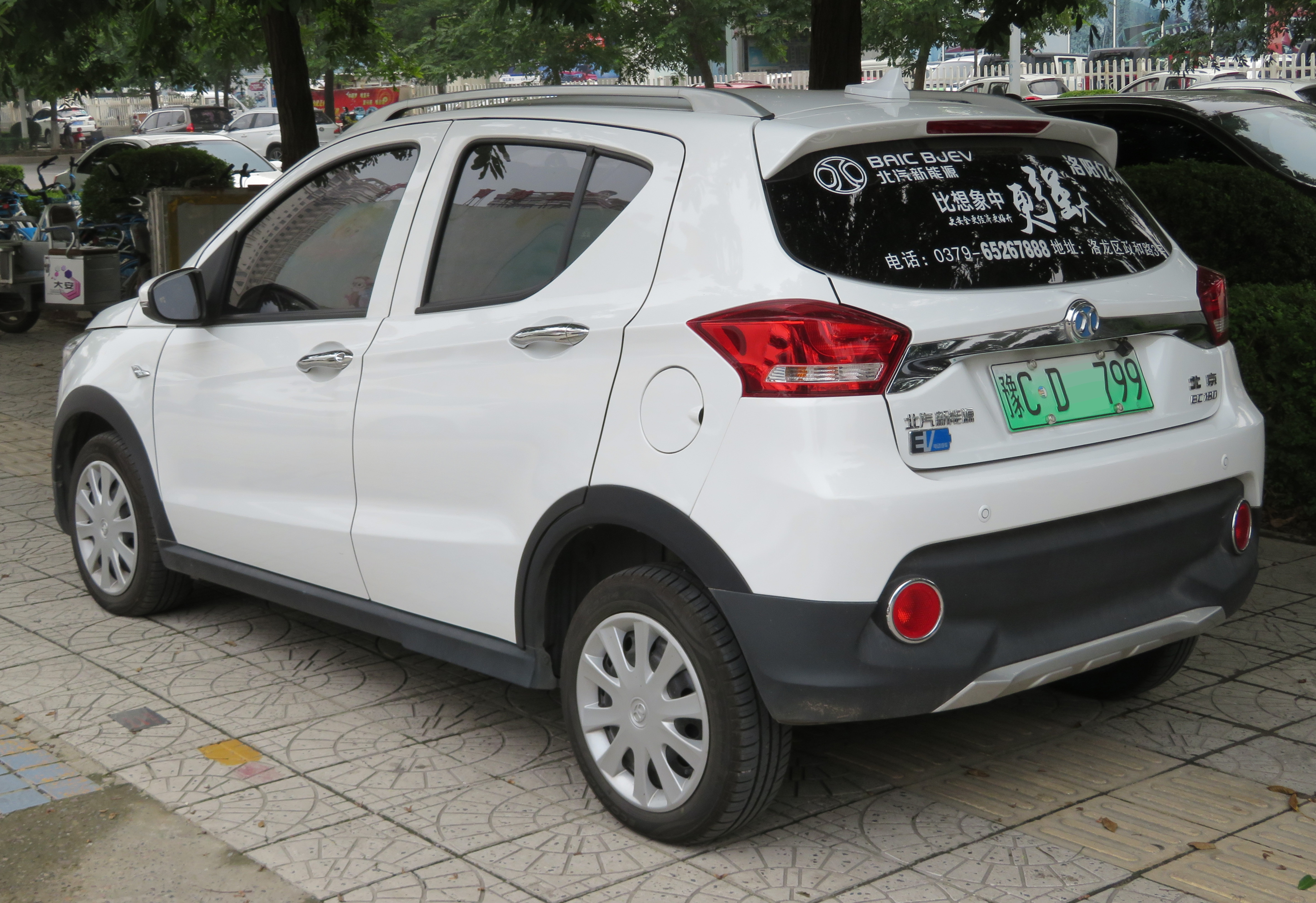
Beijing EC180 rearview (with BAIC advertisings)

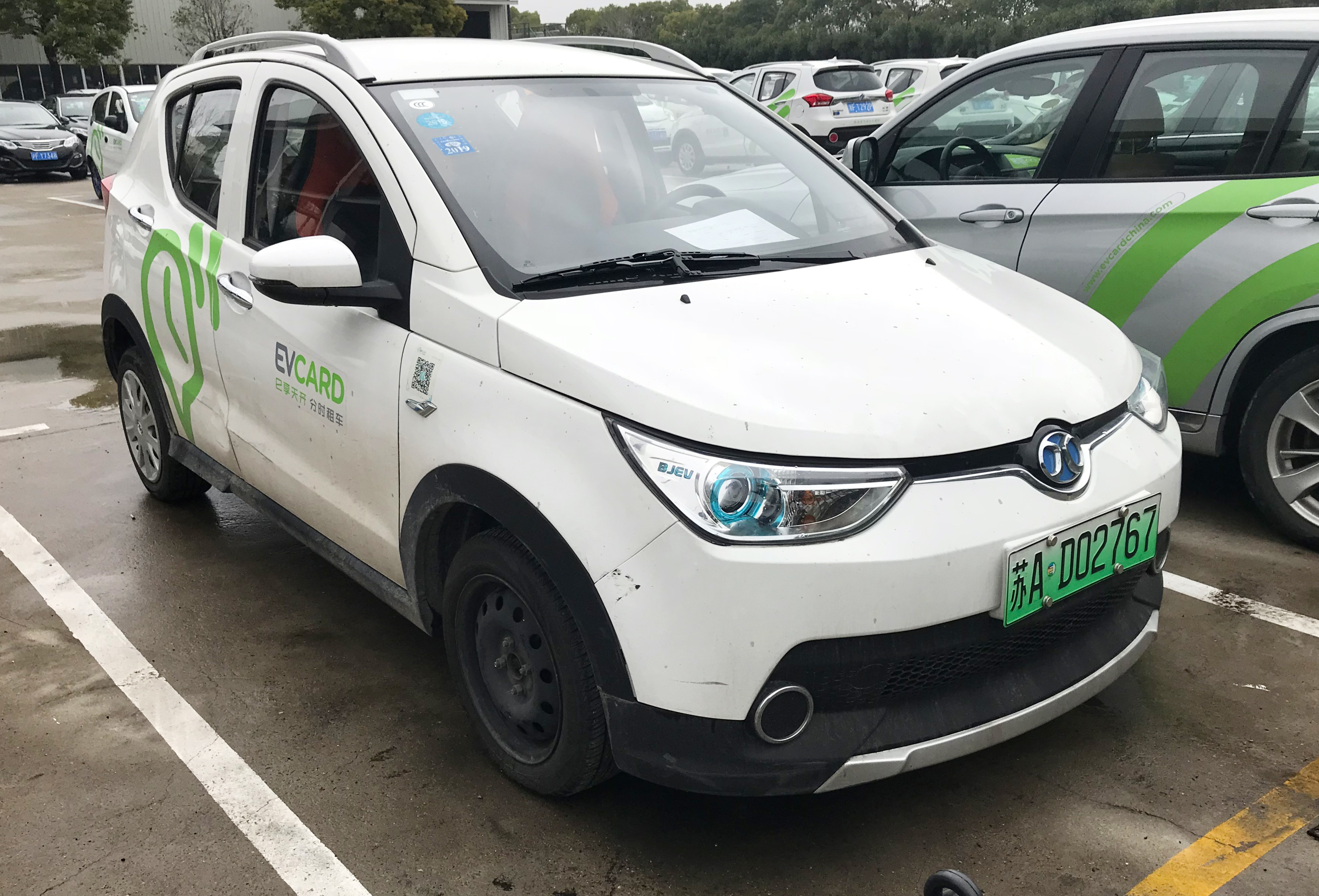
Beijing EC-180 used for EvCard electric car-sharing service (China)

=== EC3 ===
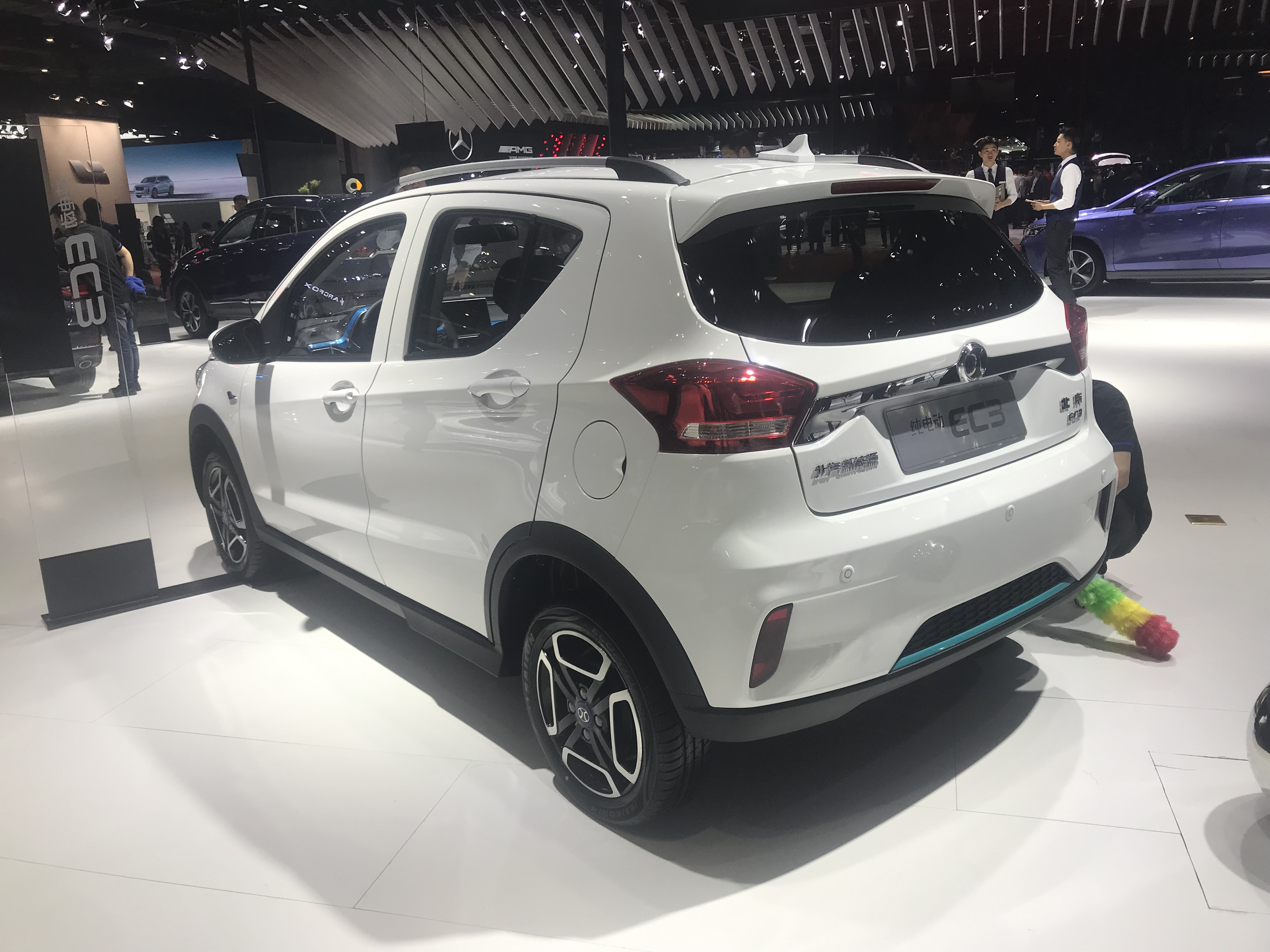
BJEV EC3 rear

The BJEV EC3 is the facelifted EC180 NEV. The EC5 debuted during the 2018 Chengdu Auto Show as an update to be more inline with the rest of the BJEV models.

The BJEV EC3 is equipped with a 45 kW (60 hp) and 150 N⋅m (111 lb⋅ft) electric motor and a 30.66kWh battery. The NEDC tested range is 261 kilometers.
