= ECCC =

ECCC may refer to:

- East Central Community College, a junior college in Decatur, Mississippi, USA
- Eastern Collegiate Cycling Conference, a college-level bicycle-racing association in the eastern USA
- Electronic Colloquium on Computational Complexity, an electronic archive of computer science papers
- Electronic Commerce Council of Canada, the former name of GS1 Canada, a trade association
- Emerald City Comic Con, an annual comic book and pop culture convention held annually in Seattle, Washington, USA.
- Environment and Climate Change Canada, a department of the Government of Canada
- Essex County Cricket Club, a club for the sport of cricket in Essex, England
- European Club Cup of Champions, a table tennis competition
- European Champion Clubs Cup (athletics), an athletics competition
- European Chess Club Cup, a team chess tournament
- European Cybersecurity Competence Centre, an agency of the European Union
- Evangelical Christian Church in Canada, the Canadian branch of Evangelical Christianity
- Extraordinary Chambers in the Courts of Cambodia, better known as the Khmer Rouge Tribunal
- Taiwan–Hong Kong Economic and Cultural Co-operation Council
