= Arcfox Alpha-T6 =

Battery electric mid-size crossover SUV

Arcfox αT6
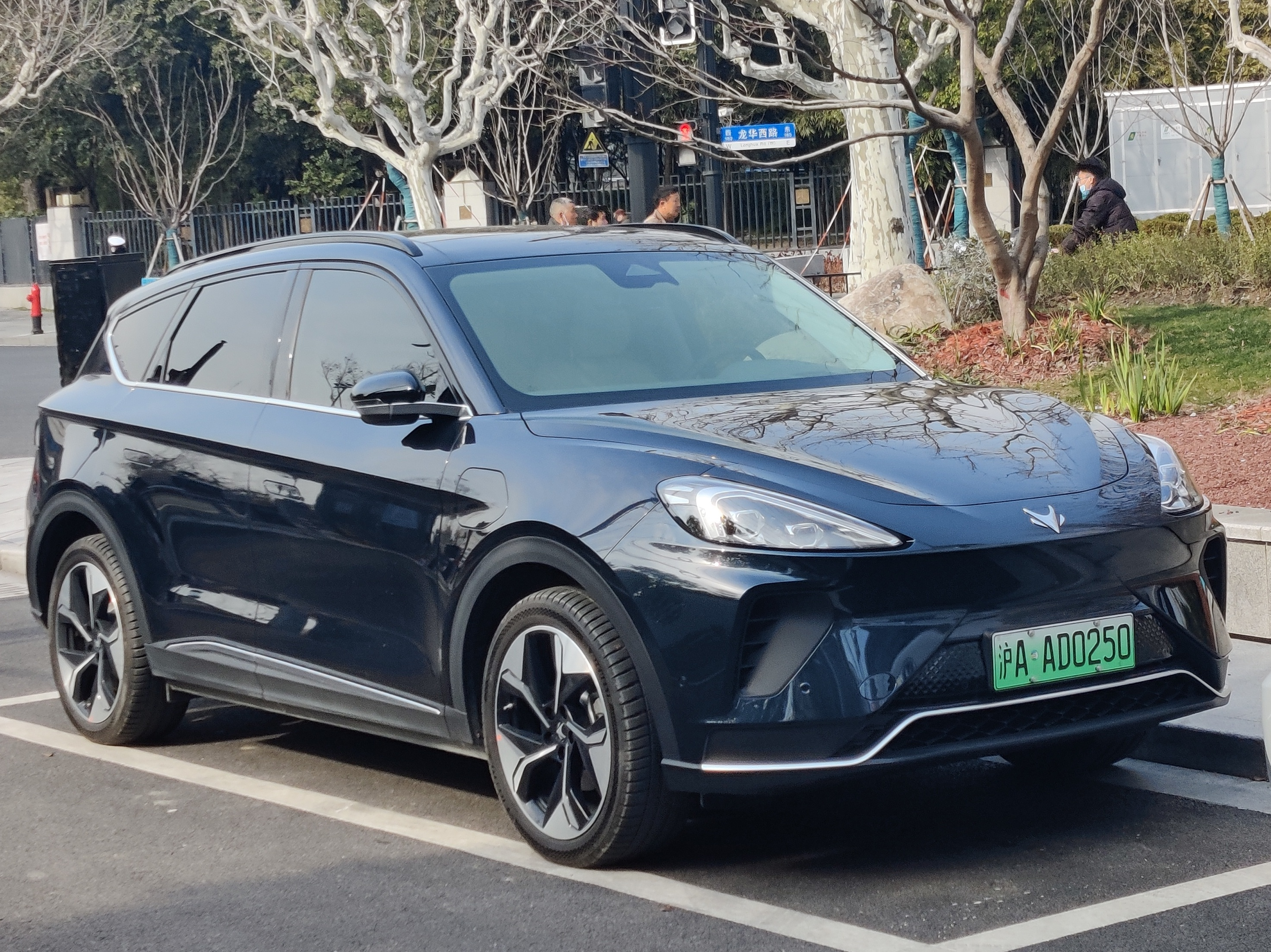

Overview
- Manufacturer: Arcfox (BAIC Group)
- Also called: Arcfox Alpha-T (2020–2025)
- Production: 2020–present
- Assembly: China: Zhenjiang

Body and chassis
- Class: Mid-size crossover SUV
- Body style: 5-door SUV
- Layout: Front-motor, front-wheel drive; Rear-motor, rear-wheel drive; Dual motor 4WD

Powertrain
- Electric motor: AC induction/asynchronous, permanent magnet motor
- Power output: 218 hp (221 PS; 163 kW) (480S / 653S); 435 hp (441 PS; 324 kW) (H)
- Transmission: 1-speed direct-drive reduction
- Battery: Li-ion battery: 67.3 kWh; 93.6 kWh
- Electric range: 653 km (406 miles)

Dimensions
- Wheelbase: 2,915 mm (115 in)
- Length: 4,788 mm (189 in)
- Width: 1,940 mm (76 in)
- Height: 1,683 mm (66 in)

The Arcfox αT6 (Chinese: 极狐阿尔法T6), previously the Arcfox Alpha-T until 2025, is a battery electric mid-size crossover SUV manufactured by BAIC under the Arcfox brand. The αT6 is the first production vehicle under the Arcfox brand.

== Overview ==
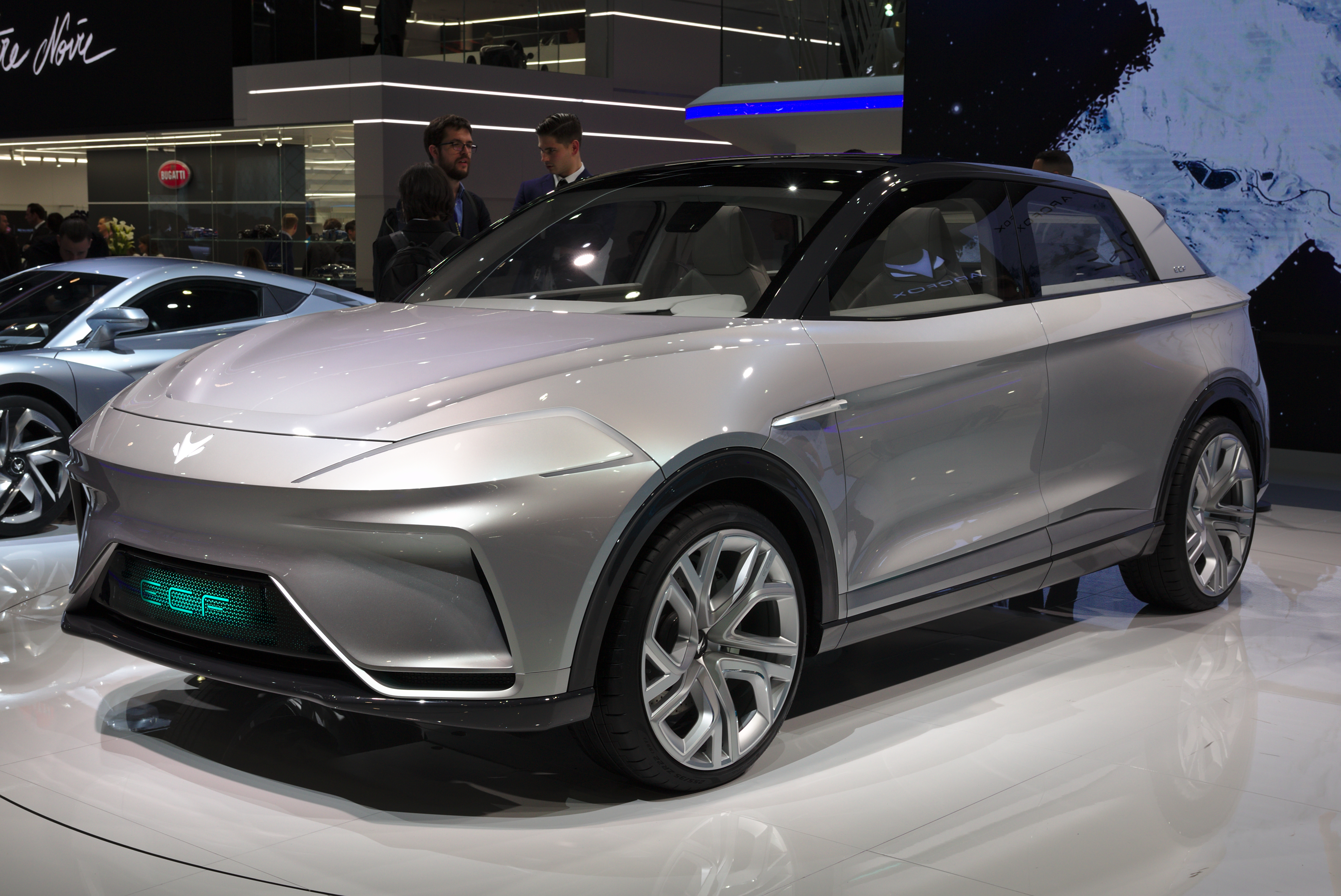
Arcfox ECF Concept

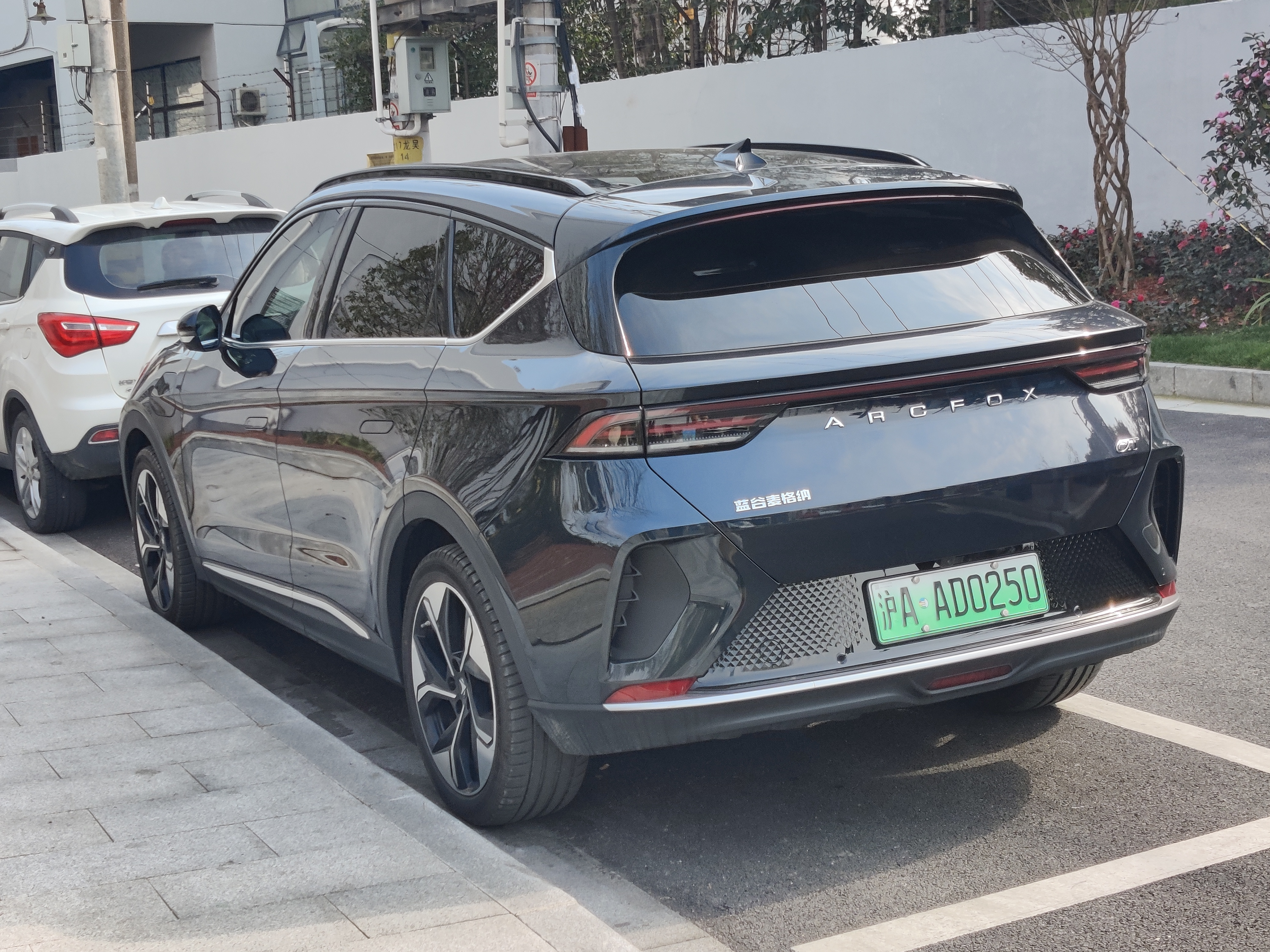
Rear view

The αT6 was previewed by BAIC BJEV at the Geneva Motor Show 2019 as the Arcfox ECF Concept. Prices of the αT6 starts from 280,000 yuan ($39,564) in China and the first customer deliveries started in August 2020. The αT6 is manufactured by Magna and BJEV in a plant located in Zhenjiang, Jiangsu province. The capacity of the plant previously owned by BAIC is 180,000 vehicles per year.

== Specifications ==
The αT6 is powered by a pair of electric motors that can produce 218 hp (163 kW; 221 PS) and 265 lb⋅ft (359 N⋅m) of torque by each motor, or combined 436 hp (325 kW; 442 PS) and 530 lb⋅ft (720 N⋅m). The motors are powered by a 93.6 kWh battery pack supplied by SK Innovation in South Korea. The crossover SUV is capable of a 653 km (406 mi) of NEDC range.

The αT6 comes standard with Level 2 autonomous driving and is equipped with 5G-compatible systems required to eventually meet Level 3 self-driving software updates.

== Sales ==
Year	China
2023	5,141
2024	2,537
2025	1,037
