= Beijing EX3 =

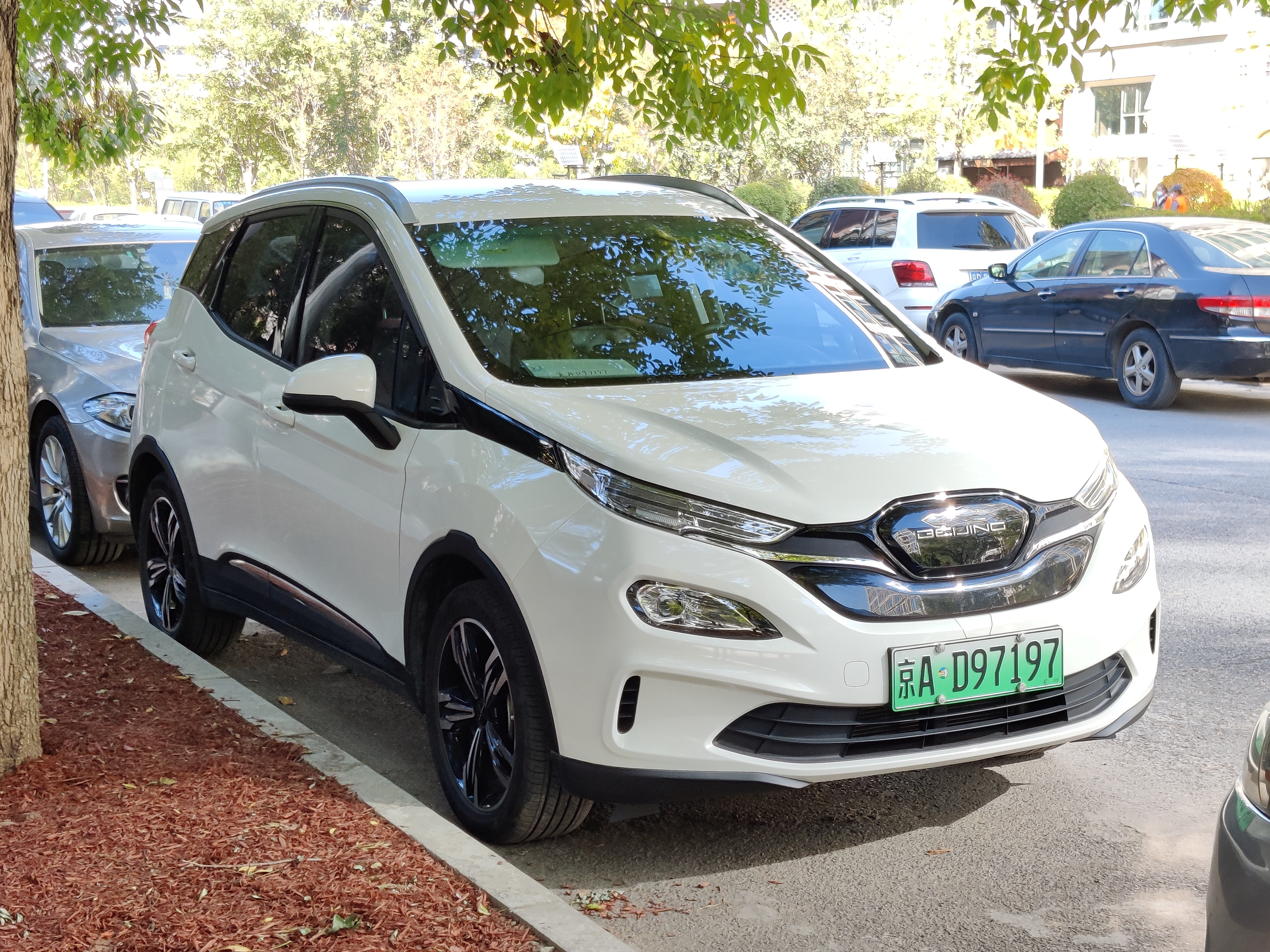
- Beijing EX3

Overview
- Manufacturer: Beijing (BAIC)
- Also called: BJEV EX3
- Production: 2018–2022
- Model years: 2018–2022

Body and chassis
- Class: Subcompact
- Body style: 5-door Hatchback
- Layout: Electric Drive Unit, front-wheel drive

Powertrain
- Electric motor: 160 kW (215 hp) permanent magnet motor/generator, torque 300 N⋅m (221 lb⋅ft)
- Transmission: Electronic Precision Shift, single speed
- Battery: lithium-ion
- Electric range: 501 kilometres (311 mi)
- Plug-in charging: 120 V, 240 V AC

Dimensions
- Wheelbase: 2,585 mm (102 in)
- Length: 4,200 mm (165 in)
- Width: 1,780 mm (70 in)
- Height: 1,638 mm (64 in)
- Curb weight: 1,600 kg (3,527 lb)

The Beijing EX3 or previously the BJEV EX3 is a front-motor, five-door all-electric subcompact hatchback marketed by BAIC Motor Electric Vehicle Co Ltd. The maker is a wholly owned subsidiary of BAIC Group. The EX3 was marketed under the Beijing brand as of 2020.

== History ==
The EX3 was originally previewed as the EX3 Concept on the 2018 Beijing Auto Show. The production model is launched in the same year despite having a very different appearance.

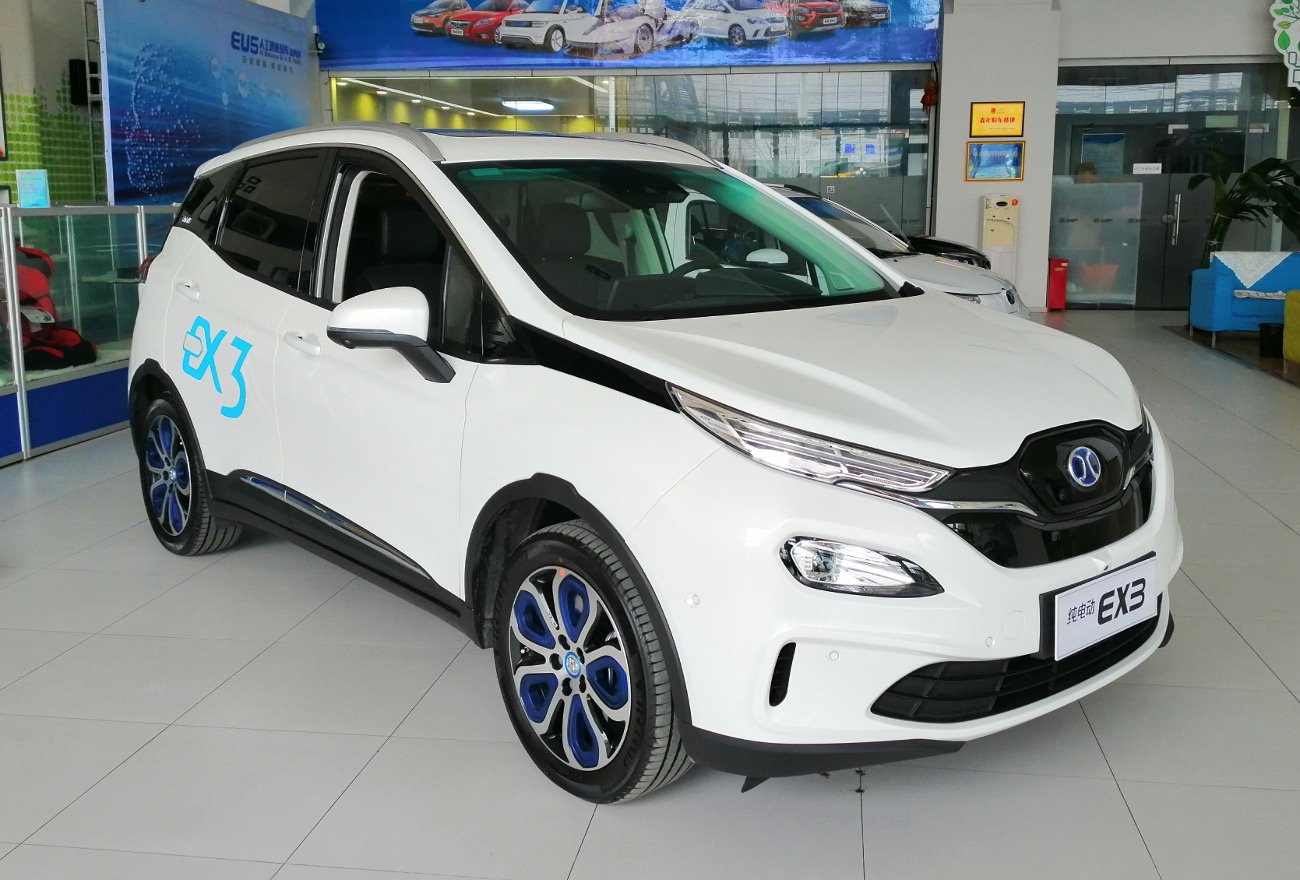
BJEV EX3

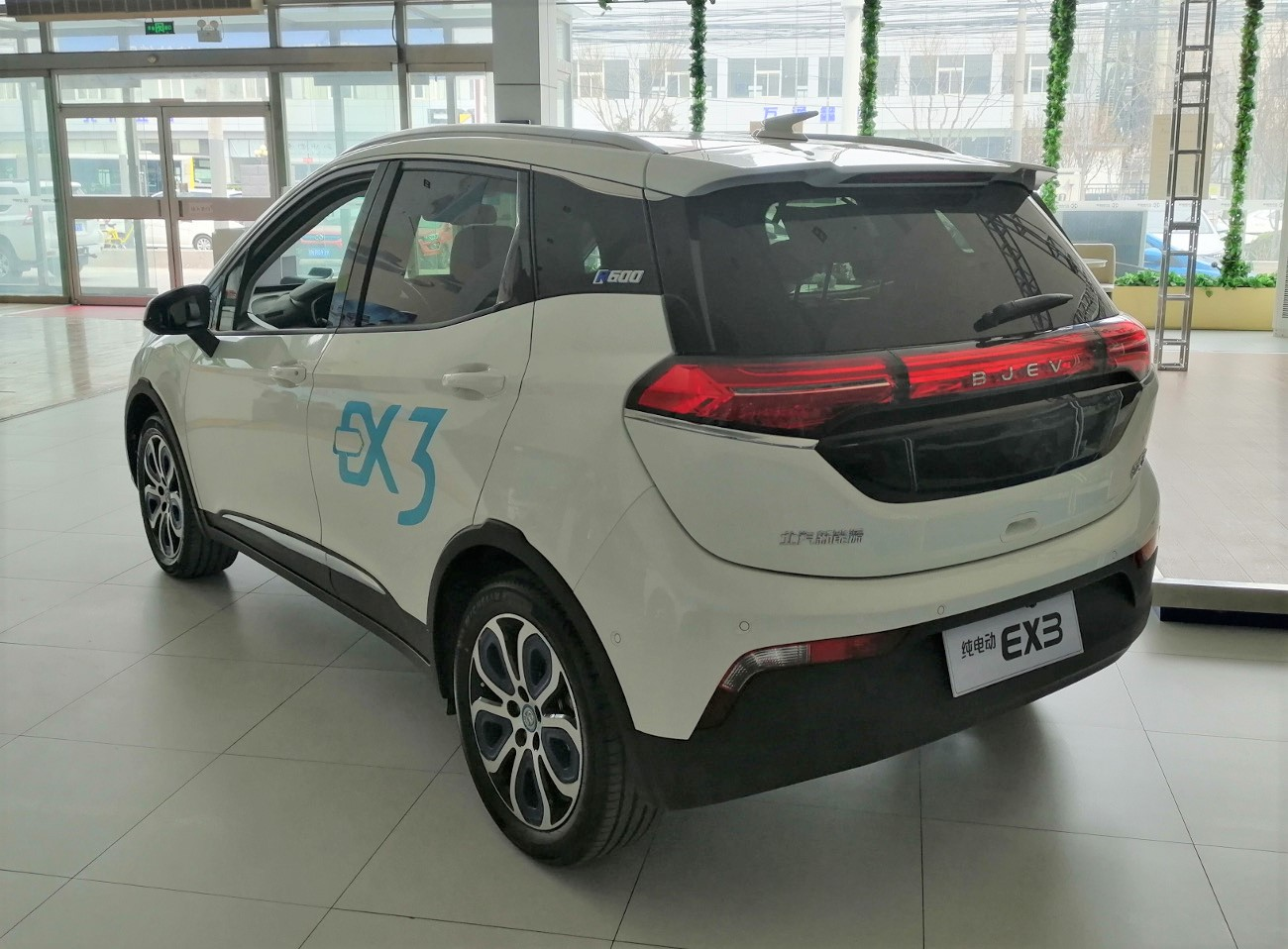
BJEV EX3 rear quarter

The production EX3 was sold under the BJEV product line, and The price range of the BJEV EX3 at launch was 133,900 yuan to 163,900 yuan. As of 2020, the BJEV branding was replaced by the Beijing brand.

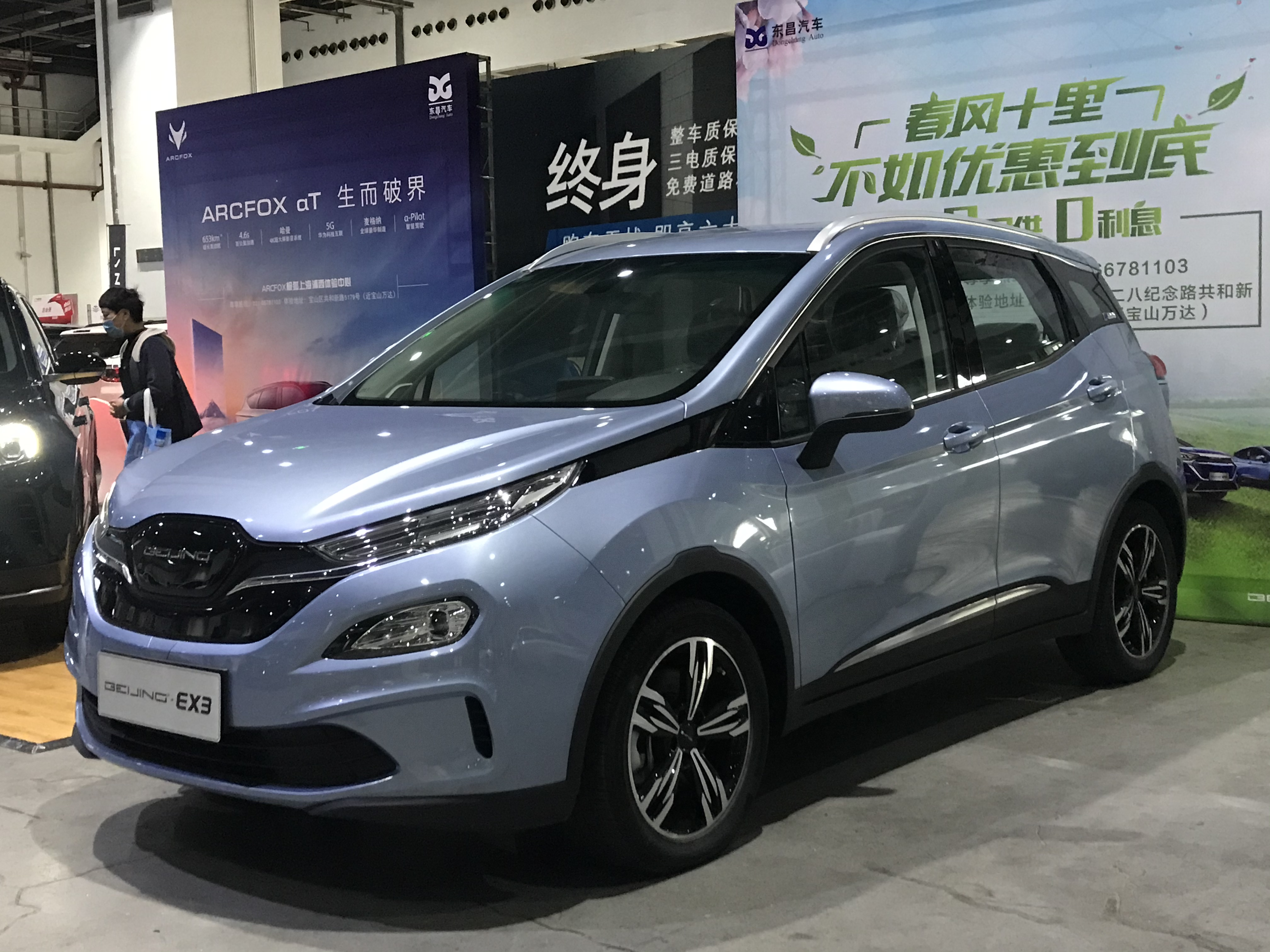
Beijing EX3

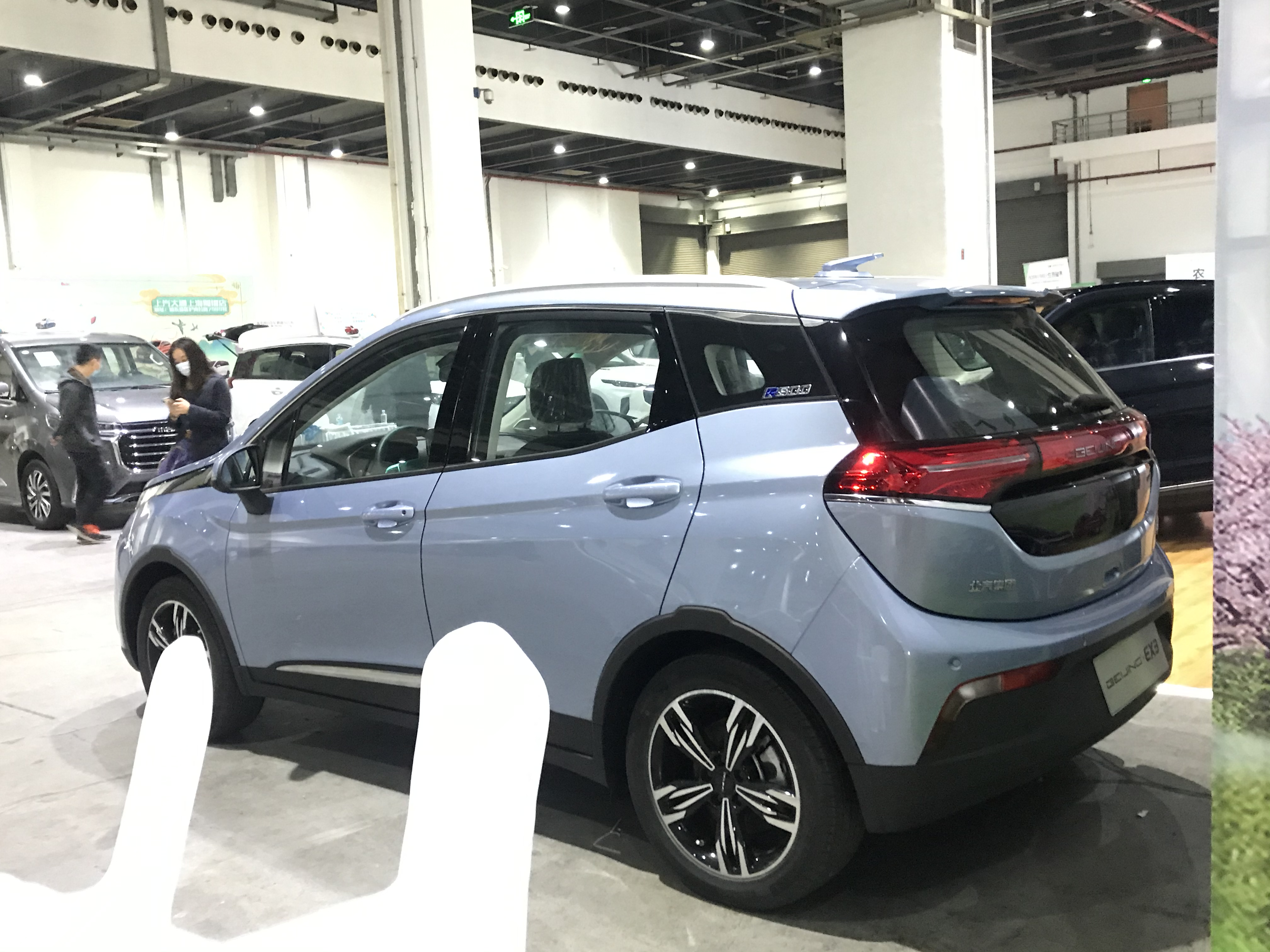
Beijing EX3 rear quarter

=== Sales ===
BAIC BJEV EX3 is an electric car manufactured and sold exclusively for the domestic Chinese market, where the first units began to be delivered to buyers in April 2019. Buyers have 5 different equipment options at their disposal.

=== Specifications ===
The motor powering the Beijing EX3 has a peak power at 160 kW (215 hp) and peak torque at 300 N⋅m (221 lb⋅ft). The range depends on the different models with the new-for-2020 R500 capable of a range of 421 km (NEDC). A limited-edition model launched at the end of 2019 is capable of a range of 476 km, and the R600 is capable of a range of 501 km.

The Beijing EX3 is equipped with ternary lithium batteries, with an electronic control system monitoring the vehicle, aiding battery life, acceleration, and driver control. The EX3 also features voice control for sat-nav, a fixed sunroof, and multimedia functions.

=== Design controversies ===
Styling of the BJEV EX3 is controversial, as the exterior design heavily resembles the Chevrolet Bolt EV.

== See also ==
- Chevrolet Bolt
- Government incentives for plug-in electric vehicles
- List of production battery electric vehicles
- Plug-in electric vehicle
