= TCR Touring Car =

Touring car racing specification

Motor racing formula
- Category: Touring car racing
- Country or region: International and regional
- Inaugural season: 2015
- Status: Active

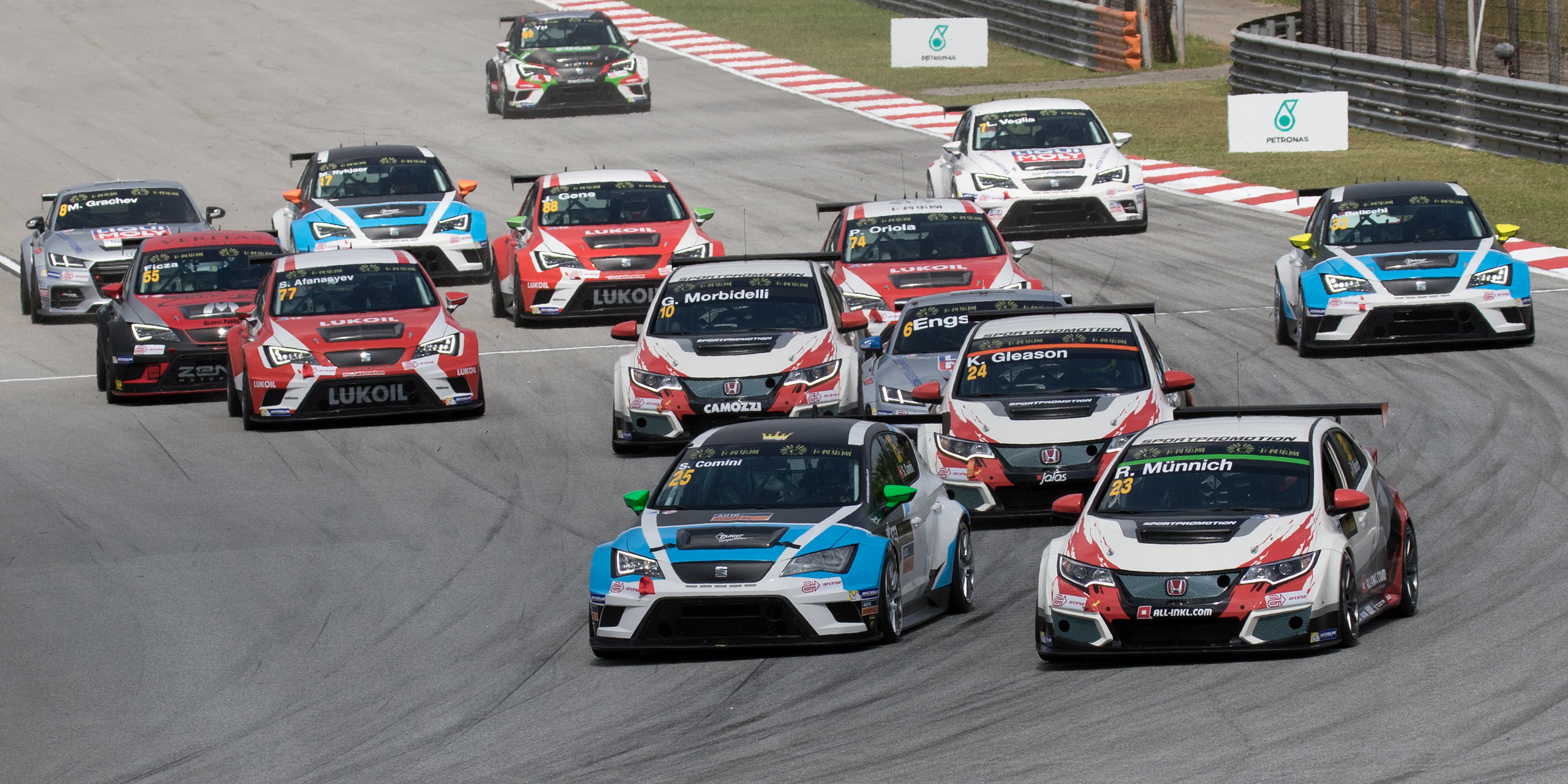
A group of TCR touring cars at Sepang International Circuit, featuring Audi, Honda, and SEAT.

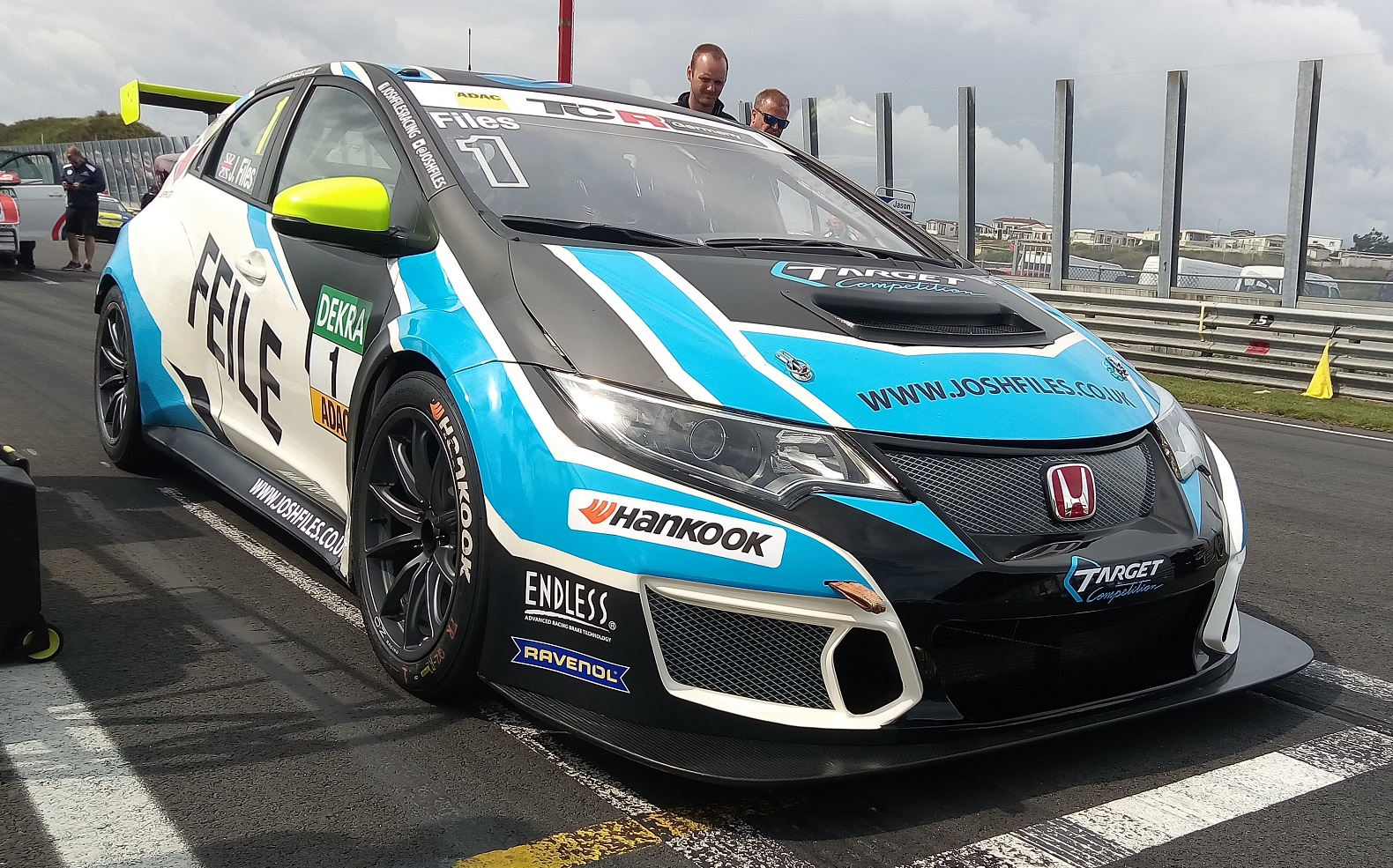
A 2017 spec Honda Civic Type-R TCR (FK2) on the ADAC TCR Germany Touring Car Championship grid.

A TCR Touring Car is a touring car specification first introduced in 2014. Created by the WSC Group, led by Marcello Lotti, the ruleset is now employed by a multitude of series worldwide.

All TCR Touring Cars are front wheel drive cars based on 4- or 5-door production vehicles, and are powered by 1.75 to 2.0 litre turbocharged engines. While the bodyshell and suspension layout of the production vehicle is retained in a TCR car, and many models use a production gearbox, certain accommodations are made for the stresses of the racetrack including upgraded brakes and aerodynamics. Competition vehicles are subject to balance of performance (BoP) adjustments to ensure close racing between different vehicles.

== History ==
The project to develop the TCR specification was spearheaded by former World Touring Car Championship manager Marcello Lotti. All TCR cars have a common forefather; the SEAT León Cup Racer racing car which was introduced as successor to the SEAT León Supercopa used in several successful single-make series. The 2.0L engine formula was derived from this car, as well as the standardised front splitter and rear wing. Initially, the specification and accompanying international series was known as TC3, to indicate its intended position at the entry-level end of the touring car pyramid. However, upon being approved by the FIA in December 2014, the specification was renamed TCR.

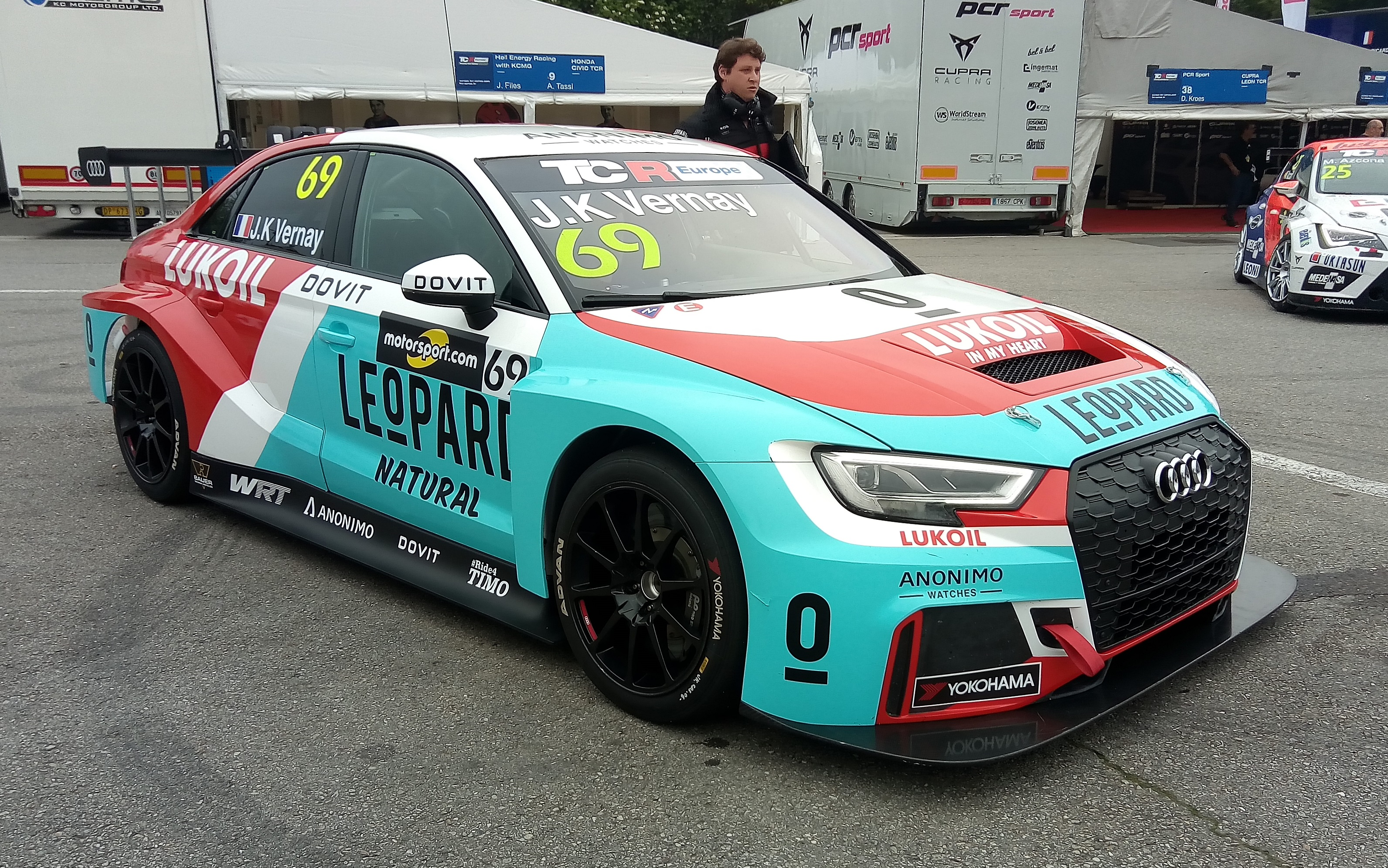
An Audi RS 3 LMS TCR in the TCR Europe Series

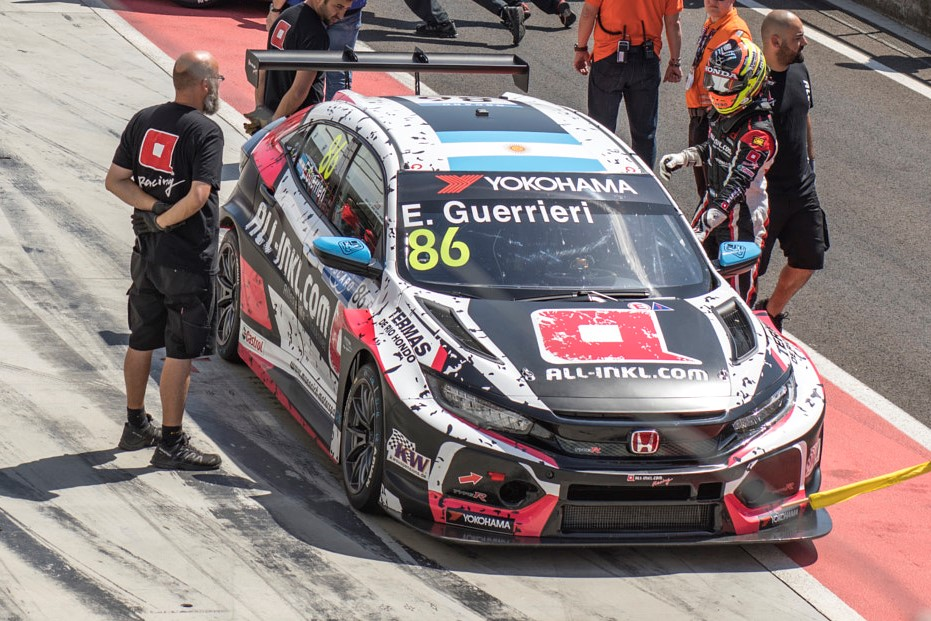
A Honda Civic Type R TCR (FK8), in the World Touring Car Cup pits at Hungaroring

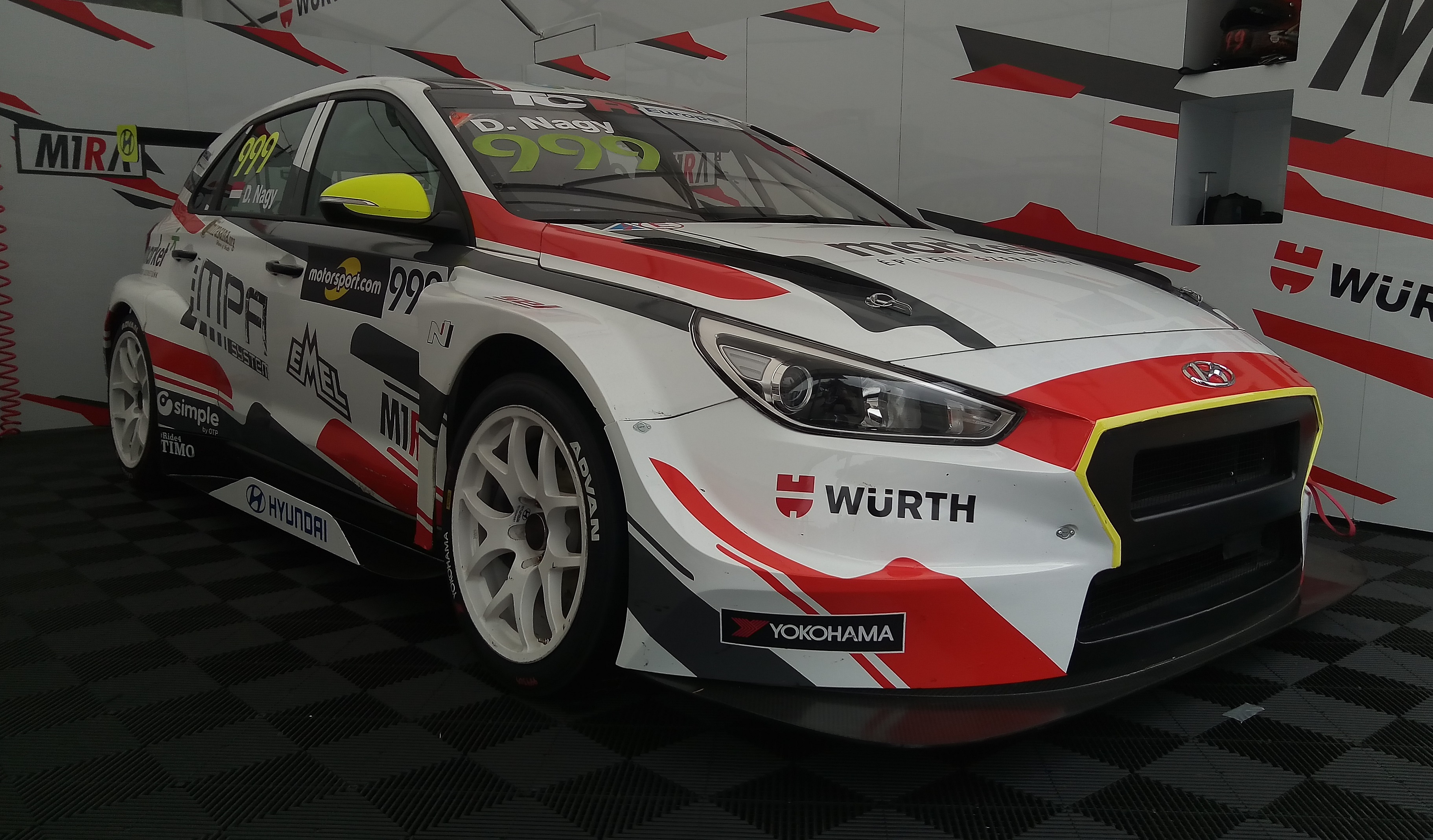
A Hyundai i30 N TCR in the TCR Europe Series

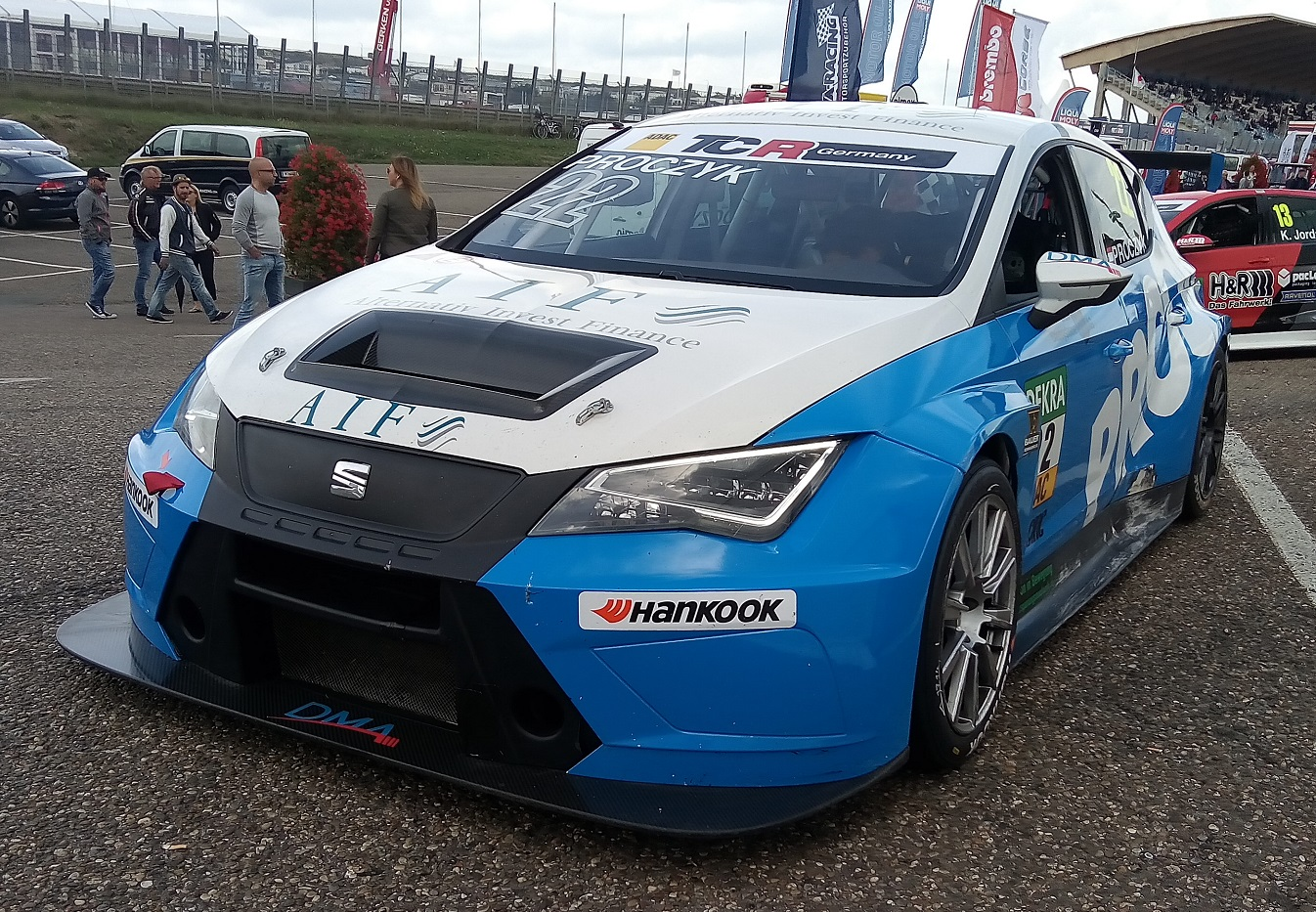
A SEAT León TCR in the ADAC TCR Germany Touring Car Championship paddock

== Technical regulations ==
On 15 September 2014, technical regulations for the category were announced. On 22 January 2016, minor changes were applied.

Eligible cars: 4/5-door vehicles

Body shell: Reinforced production body shell; wheel arch modifications allowed to accommodate tyres

Minimum weight: 1250 kg for cars with production gearbox, 1285 kg for cars with racing gearbox (both including the driver)

Minimum overall length: 4.2 metres

Maximum overall width: 1.95 metres

Engine: Turbo-charged petrol or diesel up to 2 litre

Torque: 420 N⋅m (310 lb⋅ft)

Power: 355 PS (350.1 HP)

Lubrication: Wet sump

Exhaust: Homologated catalytic converter using production parts

Traction: On two wheels

Gearbox: Production or TCR International Series sequential; production paddle shift accepted

Front Suspension: Production lay-out; parts free design

Rear Suspension: Original design of production car with reinforced components

Brakes:

- Front: max 6 piston calipers, brake discs max diameter 380mm
- Rear: max 2 piston callipers; production ABS accepted

Wheels: Maximum dimensions of rim: 10″ x 18″

Aerodynamics:

- Front splitter: 2014 SEAT León Eurocup
- Rear wing: FIA Appendix J Art. 263 2014
- Ground clearance: Minimum 80 mm
- Power/Weight Ratio: Subject to the Balance of Performance (changing between +70 and -20 kg from the minimum car weight)
- Drivetrain : FF layout

=== WTCR regulations ===
The FIA licensed the TCR regulations under the name of WTCR for usage in the World Touring Car Cup. The specification is identical, however it is frozen until the end of 2019, and cars are required to obtain an FIA passport after going through TCR homologation.

== TCR Model of the Year ==
Since 2017, TCR organisers World Sporting Consulting (WSC) have awarded the TCR Model of the Year award for the most successful TCR car across a year. The title is awarded on the basis of a points system that gives points to all the different TCR-certified cars competing in all the TCR-sanctioned races of the year. The points are adjusted by coefficients that take into account the level of the competition, the number of cars participating and the number of manufacturers represented.

=== Winners ===
Year	Model
2017	SEAT León TCR
2018	Audi RS 3 LMS TCR (2017)
2019	Honda Civic Type R TCR (FK8)
2020	Honda Civic Type R TCR (FK8)
2021	Audi RS 3 LMS TCR (2021)
2022	Audi RS 3 LMS TCR (2021)
2023	Audi RS 3 LMS TCR (2021)
2024	Honda Civic Type R TCR (FL5)
2025	Cupra León VZ TCR

== Eligible cars ==
Make	Model	Image	Engine	Developer	Note
Alfa Romeo	Giulietta TCR		Fiat 1750 TBi I4	Romeo Ferraris	
Alfa Romeo	Giulietta Veloce TCR		Fiat 1750 TBi I4	Romeo Ferraris	
Audi	RS 3 LMS TCR		Volkswagen EA888 2.0 R4 TSI I4	Audi Sport	(Note: 2 modifications of SEQ and DSG.)
Audi	RS 3 LMS TCR (21)		Volkswagen EA888 2.0 R4 TSI I4	Audi Sport	
Cupra (Note: In 2018 SEAT began using the Cupra name for its TCR cars)	León TCR (Note: Also referred to as Cupra TCR)		Volkswagen EA888 2.0 R4 TSI I4	Cupra Racing	(Note: 2 modifications of SEQ and DSG.)
Cupra	León Competición TCR		Volkswagen EA888 2.0 R4 TSI I4	Cupra Racing	
Cupra	León VZ TCR		Volkswagen EA888 2.0 R4 TSI I4	Cupra Racing	
Fiat	Tipo TCR		FCA GME MultiAir AT8 2.0T I4	Tecnodom Sport	(Note: The car made its debut as a guest entry at the 2020 TCR Europe Touring Car Series with homologation obtained in 2022.)
Geely	Preface TCR		Volvo JLH-4G20TD I4	Cyan Racing	
Holden (Note: In TCR Australia Kelly Racing entered the Astra TCR cars badged as Holden.); Opel; Vauxhall (Note: In the United Kingdom Opel is represented by its sister brand Vauxhall.)	Astra TCR		GM Ecotec LDK A20NFT I4	Opel Performance Center; Kissling Motorsport; Lubner Motorsport	(Note: Kissling Motorsport ceased cooperation with Opel, the development of the Astra TCR transferred to third-party companies Lubner Motorsport and VMax Engineering.)
Honda	Civic Type R TCR (FK2)		Honda K20C1 i-VTEC DOHC Turbo I4	JAS Motorsport	
Honda	Civic Type R TCR (FK8)		Honda K20C1 i-VTEC DOHC Turbo I4	JAS Motorsport	
Honda	Civic Type R TCR (FL5)		Honda K20C1 i-VTEC DOHC Turbo I4	JAS Motorsport	
Hyundai	i30 N TCR		Hyundai Theta II G4KD I4	Hyundai Motorsport	(Note: The Hyundai i30 N TCR was allowed to race in 2017, but was ineligible to score points, because the car hadn't received its final homologation.)
Hyundai	Veloster N TCR		Hyundai Theta II G4KD I4	Hyundai Motorsport	
Hyundai	Elantra N TCR		Hyundai Theta II G4KD I4	Hyundai Motorsport	
Hyundai	Elantra N TCR (2024)		Hyundai Theta II G4KD I4	Hyundai Motorsport	
Hyundai	Hyundai Elantra N EV TCR		Hyundai Theta II G4KD I4	Hyundai Motorsport	
Kia	Cee'd TCR		Hyundai Theta II G4KD I4	STARD	
Lada	Vesta TCR		Renault F4RT I4	Lada Sport	(Note: The Lada was created by Lada Sport for the 2017 TCR Russian Series, with the option for full TCR homologation in 2018.)
Lada	Vesta Sport TCR		Renault M5Pt I4	Lada Sport	
Lada	Vesta NG TCR		Renault M5Pt I4	Lada Sport	
Lynk & Co	03 TCR		Volvo JLH-4G20TD I4	Cyan Racing	
Lynk & Co	03 FL TCR		Volvo JLH-4G20TD I4	Cyan Racing	
Lynk & Co	03+ TCR		Volvo JLH-4G20TD I4	Teamwork Motorsport	
MG	6 XPower TCR		SAIC 20L4E TGI I4	SAIC Motor	(Note: Prototype was shown at the 2019 Shanghai Auto. The car made its debut in TCR Asia/TCR China round at Zhejiang International Circuit, but due to running on temporary homolagation it was ineligible to score points.)
MG	5 XPower TCR		SAIC 20L4E TGI I4	SAIC Motor	
Peugeot	308 Racing Cup		PSA Prince EP6FDTR 1.6l THP I4	Peugeot Sport	(Note: The Cup version of the Peugeot 308 Racing Cup does not comply with the TCR regulations for the splitter, wing, power and engine volume, but is admitted to the TCR class with the ability to score points in any TCR competition with individual BoP parameters and lower weight.)
Peugeot	308 TCR		PSA Prince EP6FDTR 1.6l THP I4	Peugeot Sport	(Note: The Cup version of the Peugeot 308 Racing Cup does not comply with the TCR regulations for the splitter, wing, power and engine volume, but is admitted to the TCR class with the ability to score points in any TCR competition with individual BoP parameters and lower weight.)
Peugeot	308 P51 TCR		PSA Prince EP6FDTR 1.6l THP I4	Garry Rogers Motorsport	(Note: The Cup version of the Peugeot 308 Racing Cup does not comply with the TCR regulations for the splitter, wing, power and engine volume, but is admitted to the TCR class with the ability to score points in any TCR competition with individual BoP parameters and lower weight.)
Renault	Mégane R.S. TCR		Renault M5Pt I4	Vuković Motorsport; Garry Rogers Motorsport	
SEAT	León Cup Racer		Volkswagen EA888 2.0 R4 TSI I4	SEAT Sport	
SEAT	León TCR		Volkswagen EA888 2.0 R4 TSI I4	SEAT Sport	(Note: Three modifications of SEQ 2016, 2017 and 2018 and three DSG 2016, 2017 and 2018.)
Subaru	WRX STI TCR		Subaru EJ20 H4	Top Run Motorsport	
Toyota	GR Corolla Sport TCR		Toyota 8AR-FTS I4	Toyota Gazoo Racing Argentina	
Volkswagen	Golf GTI TCR		Volkswagen EA888 2.0 R4 TSI I4	Volkswagen Motorsport	(Note: 4 modifications of 2016, 2017, 2018 and version of DSG.)
Announced projects and cars having taken part in races while not complying to TCR requirement
Make	Model	Image	Engine	Developer	Note
Audi	TT Cup		Volkswagen EA888 2.0 R4 TSI I4	Audi Sport	(Note: The Audi TT Cup car was allowed to race and score points for the inaugural season in 2015, while Audi Sport evaluated a future TCR car.)
BAIC Senova	D50 TCR		Saab B205R Turbo 2.0L R4 16V DOHC	BAIC Motor Beijing Senova Racing Team	(Note: The car is built according to TCR rules, but homologation is not planned by the manufacturer. Takes part in the race of own class together with other TCR cars in Macau.)
Citroën	C3 Max TCT		PSA Prince EP6FDTR 1.6l THP I4	2T Course & Reglage	(Note: The Citroën was allowed to race and score points in the TCR class of the TCR Italian Series, for the 2016 season, before the TCT class was created late on in the 2016 season.)
Fiat	Tipo TCR		Fiat 1750 TBi I4	Tecnodom Sport	(Note: The Fiat is built to TCR specification, but did not receive an official TCR homologation.)
Ford	Focus ST		Ford EcoBoost 2.0 litre I4	Onyx Grand Prix	
Ford	Focus TCR		Ford EcoBoost 2.0 litre I4	Formula Racing Development Limited	
Honda	Civic TCR		Honda K20C1 i-VTEC DOHC Turbo I4	JAS Motorsport	
Mazda	3 TCR		Mazda SkyActiv-G I4	Mazda Motorsports	(Note: canceled in August 2020 due to the coronavirus pandemic.)
Mercedes-Benz	A45 AMG TCR		Mercedes M133DE20AL 2.0T I4	LEMA Racing; Prigo	(Note: The car was built but did not receive homologation, did not take part in the races.)
Mercedes-Benz	A250 Turbo		Mercedes M270DE20AL 2.0T I4	Vuik Motorsport	(Note: The Mercedes A250 Turbo was not allowed to participate in the European Cup in the TCN-2 class since it does not have national homologation.)
Opel	Astra OPC		GM Ecotec LDK A20NFT I4	Opel Performance Center; Kissling Motorsport	(Note: The Opel Astra OPC was allowed to race and score points for the inaugural season in 2015, while Opel and Kissling Motorsport evaluated a future TCR car.)
Renault	Mégane RS		Renault F4RT I4	Renault Dealer Team Saint Petersburg; Ralf-Car Team	(Note: The Renault was built to semi TCR spec by Ralf-Car Team for the 2015 TCR Russian Series, it was allowed to score points in the TCR class.)

== List of TCR series ==
=== As premier class ===
==== International ====
- TCR World Tour
- FIA Motorsport Games

==== Regional ====
- TCR Asia Series
- TCR Europe Touring Car Series
- TCR Eastern Europe Trophy
- TCR South America Touring Car Championship

==== National ====
- Italian Superturismo Championship
- Russian Circuit Racing Series
- TCR Asia Challenge
- TCR Brazil Touring Car Championship
- TCR China Challenge
- TCR China Touring Car Championship
- TCR Chinese Taipei Series
- TCR European Endurance
- TCR Panamá Touring Car Championship
- TCR Mexico Series
- TCR Spain Touring Car Championship
- TCR UK Touring Car Championship

=== As subsidiary class ===
- 24H Series
- 24H Series Middle East
- Aurum 1006 km
- Austrian GT
- Belcar
- Britcar
- Campeonato Nacional de Velocidade
- CEZ Circuit Endurance
- China Endurance Championship
- China Touring Car Championship
- DMV Super Touring & GT Cup
- GT Challenge de las Américas
- GTC Endurance Challenge
- Golf Pro Car
- Michelin Pilot Challenge
- Nürburgring Langstrecken-Serie
- Scandinavian Touring Car Championship (Series paused, planning for 2026/27 season)
- Spanish Touring Car Championship
- Sports Car Championship Canada
- Super Taikyu Series
- Supercar Challenge
- Supercar Endurance Series
- TC America Series
- TC France Series
- World Racing league

=== Defunct series ===
- ADAC TCR Germany Touring Car Championship
- Canadian Touring Car Championship
- eTouring Car World Cup
- European Touring Car Cup
- TC Open
- TCR Australia Touring Car Series
- TCR Baltic Trophy
- TCR Benelux Touring Car Championship
- TCR Denmark Touring Car Series
- TCR Iberico Touring Car Series
- TCR International Series
- TCR Japan Touring Car Series
- TCR Korea Touring Car Series
- TCR Las Américas Series
- TCR Middle East Touring Car Series
- TCR Malaysia Touring Car Championship
- TCR New Zealand Series
- TCR Portuguese Series
- TCR Swiss Trophy
- TCR Thailand Touring Car Championship
- TCR USA
- Touring Car Endurance Series
- UAE Touring Car Championship
- World Touring Car Championship

== See also ==
- List of current Motorsport Championships
- Touring Car Racing
- Group 1
- Group 2
- Group A
- Group N
- Class 1 Touring
- Super 2000
- Diesel 2000
- Super Touring
- BTC Touring
- Next Generation Touring Car
