= Changhe A6 =

Chinese compact sedan

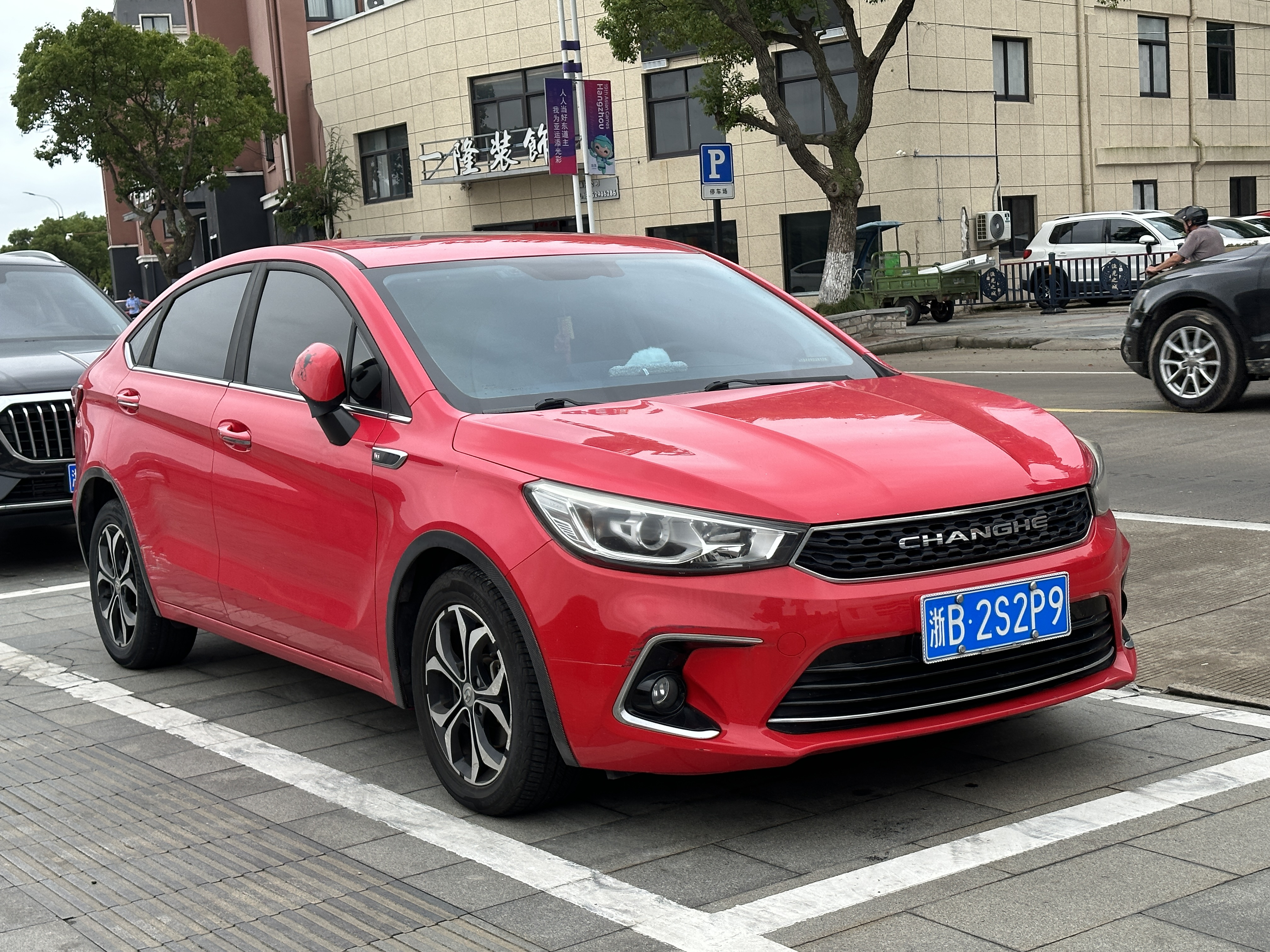

Overview
- Manufacturer: Changhe
- Also called: Ruixiang C5 EV
- Production: 2018–2021
- Assembly: China

Body and chassis
- Class: Compact car (C)
- Body style: 4-door sedan
- Layout: Transverse front-engine, front-wheel-drive
- Related: Senova D50 (second generation)

Powertrain
- Engine: 1.5 L A151 I4 (petrol)
- Transmission: 5-speed manual; CVT

Dimensions
- Wheelbase: 2,672 mm (105 in)
- Length: 4,620 mm (182 in)
- Width: 1,810 mm (71 in)
- Height: 1,485 mm (58 in)

The Changhe A6 is a compact sedan produced by BAIC under the Changhe subsidiary.

== Overview ==
The Changhe A6 compact sedan shares the same platform with the second generation Senova D50, and the engine is also the Mitsubishi-sourced 1.5-liter producing 116 hp (87 kW) and 142 Nm of torque used by Senova D50. Prices of the Changhe A6 ranges from 69,800 to 99,800 yuan.

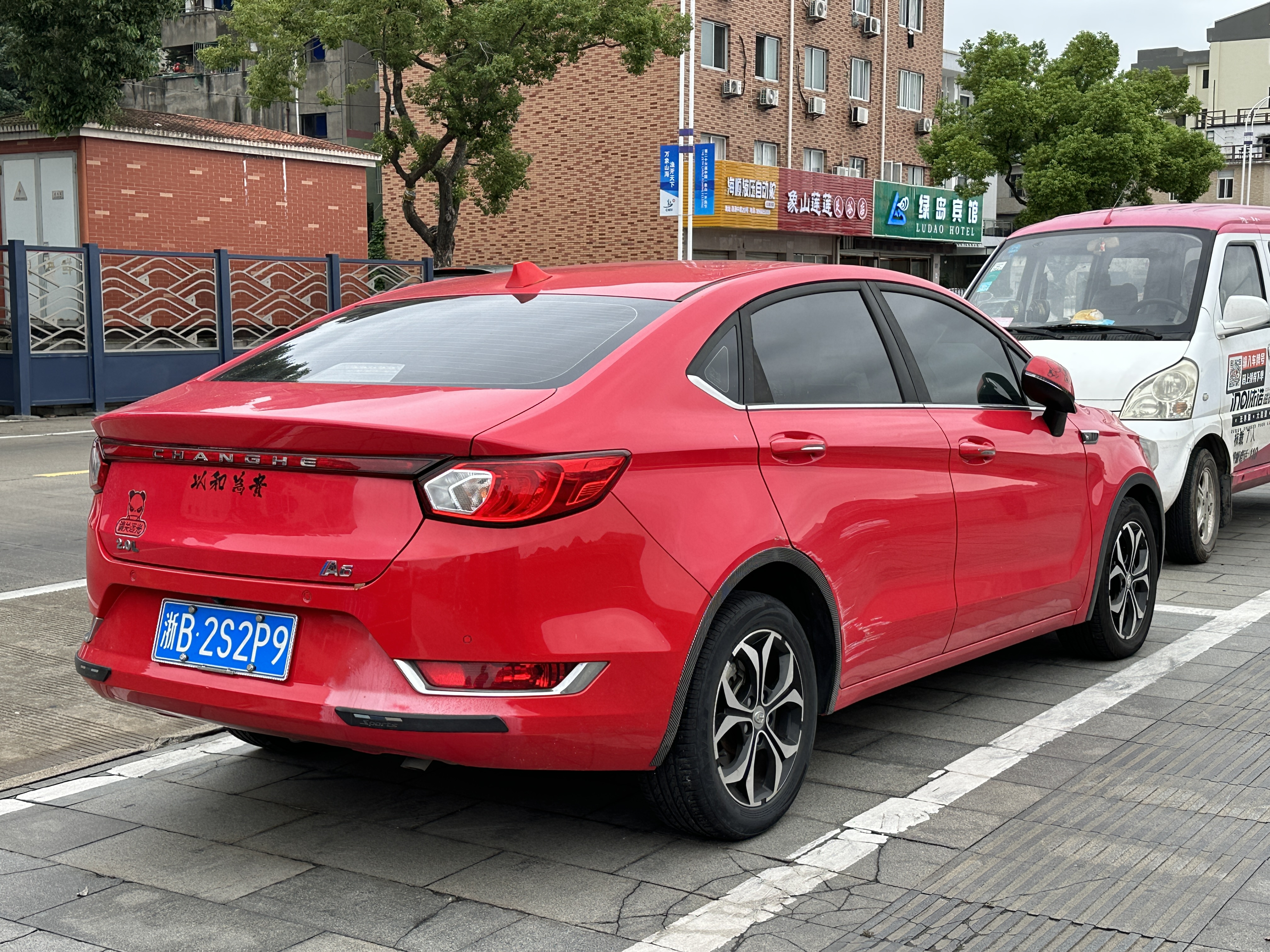
Changhe A6 rear
