= 2019 TCR Korea Touring Car Series =

The 2019 TCR Korea Touring Car Series was supposed to be the second And final season of the TCR Korea Touring Car Series. The season was set to begin on 3 May at the Korea International Circuit supporting the TCR Asia Series and was expected to end on 20 October at the same circuit. Due to contractual disagreements, on May 13, the championship organizer announced the cancellation of the championship for the 2019 season.

== Calendar and results ==
The provisional calendar was released on 12 December 2018, with all rounds being held within South Korea.

Rnd.	Circuit	Date
1	Korea International Circuit, Yeongam	3–5 May
2	Everland Speedway, Yongin	1–2 June
3	Inje Speedium, Inje	13 July
4	Everland Speedway, Yongin	17–18 August
5	Inje Speedium, Inje	7–8 September
6	Korea International Circuit, Yeongam	19–20 October
