= Beijing U5 =

Compact sedan

Senova D50/Beijing U5
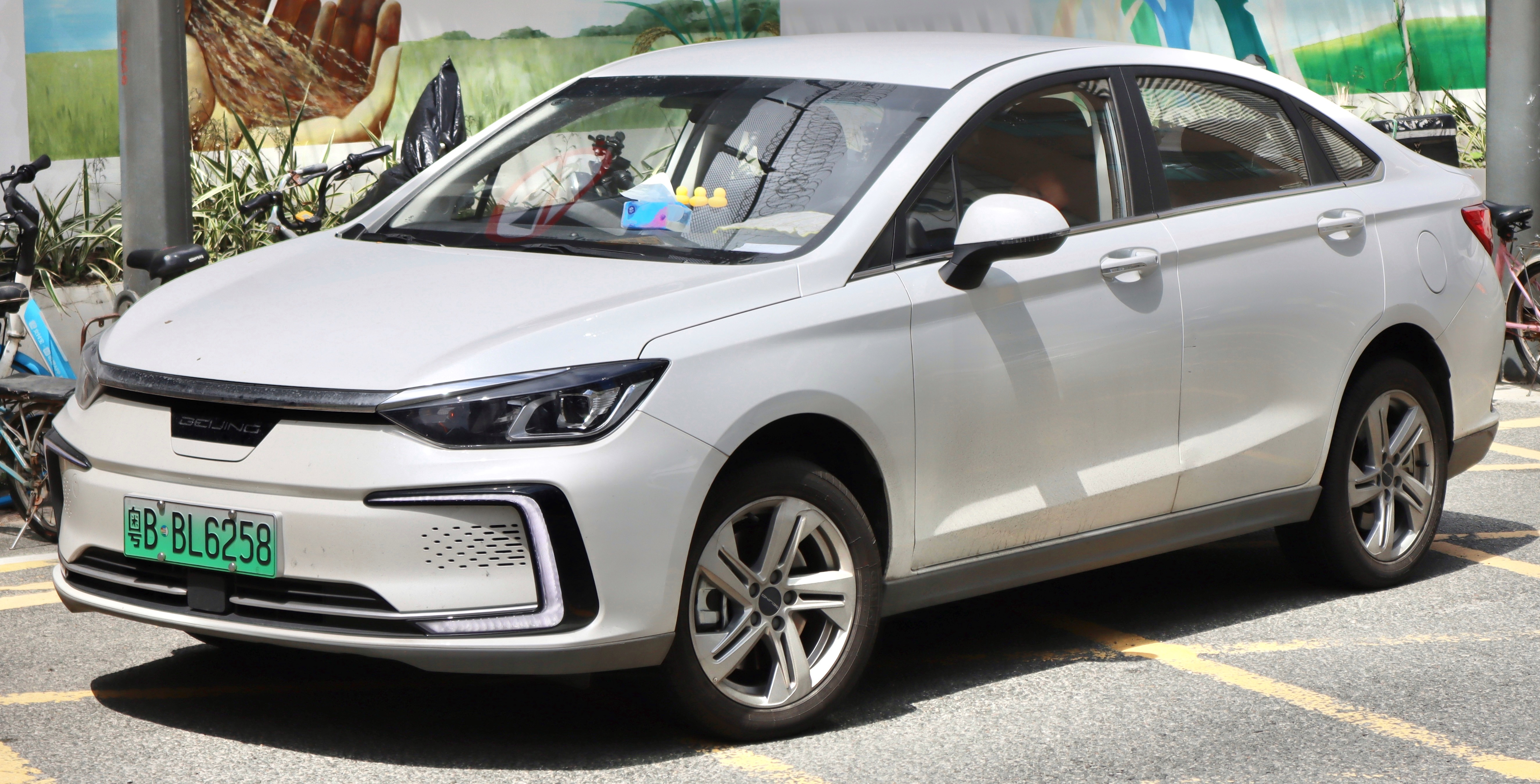
- Beijing U5

Overview
- Manufacturer: Beijing (BAIC)
- Production: 2013–present

Body and chassis
- Class: Compact car
- Body style: 4-door sedan
- Layout: Front-engine, front-wheel drive

The Beijing U5 (Chinese: 北京U5) or previously the Senova D50 (Chinese: 绅宝D50) is a compact sedan produced by BAIC under the Senova (Shenbao 绅宝) brand and later the Beijing brand. The electric version is called the EU5, and was branded as the BJEV or BAIC EU5 before being rebadged as the Beijing EU5. The U5 and EU5 both received a facelift in 2021 and was renamed to U5 plus and EU5 Plus sold under the Beijing brand.

== First generation (2014) ==
First generation
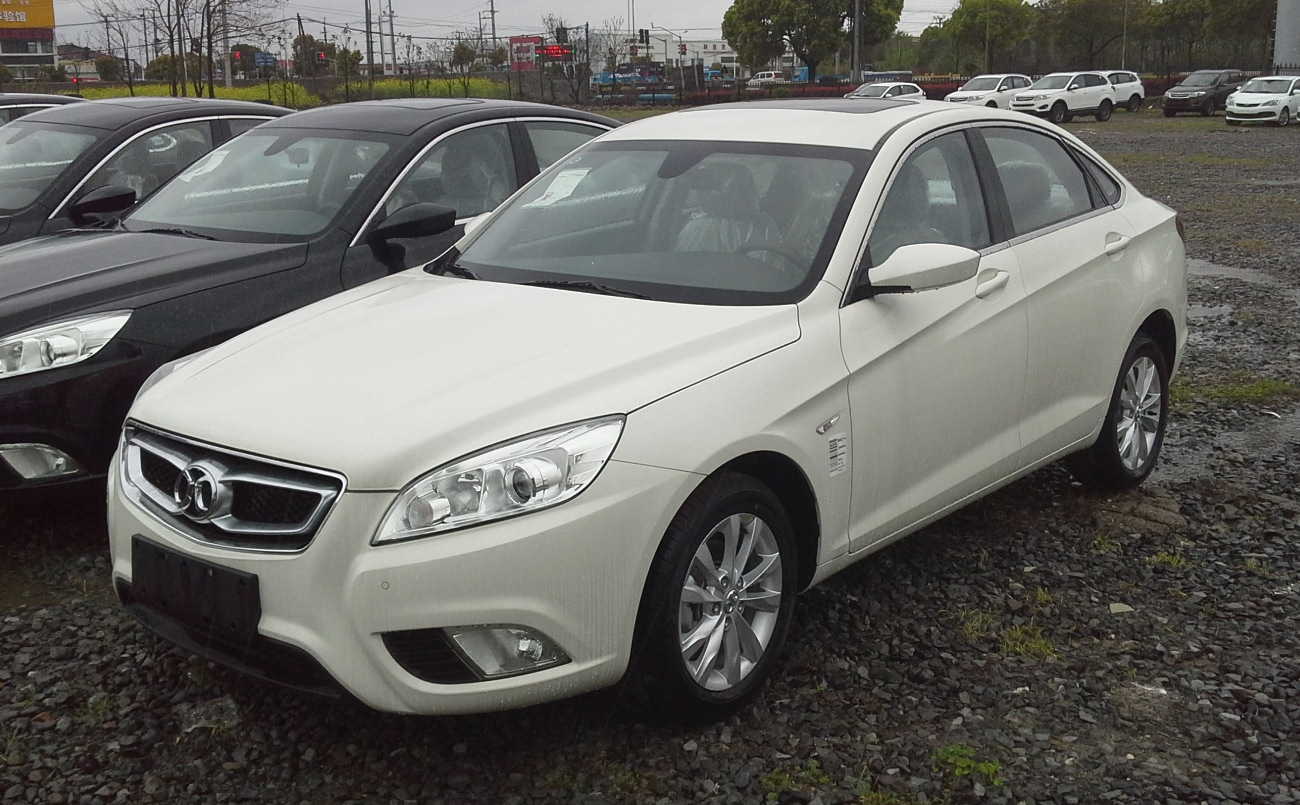

Overview
- Also called: Beijing Auto C50E; BJEV EU260; BJEV EU300; BJEV EU400
- Production: 2013–2017
- Model years: 2014–2018
- Assembly: China
- Designer: Mike Robinson at Bertone

Body and chassis
- Class: Compact car (C)
- Body style: 4-door sedan
- Layout: Transverse front-engine, front-wheel-drive
- Platform: M-trix (Based on the Saab 9-3 platform)

Powertrain
- Engine: 1.5 L A151 I4 (petrol); 1.5 L 4A91 I4 (turbo petrol)
- Electric motor: One 101 kW (135 hp; 137 PS)
- Transmission: 5-speed manual CVT automatic
- Battery: 41.4 kWh LFP (BJEV EU260); 45.3 kWh LFP (BJEV EU300); 54.4 kWh LFP (BJEV EU400)
- Electric range: 260 km (160 mi) (BJEV EU260); 300 km (190 mi) (BJEV EU300); 400 km (250 mi) (BJEV EU400)

Dimensions
- Wheelbase: 2,650 mm (104.3 in)
- Length: 4,582 mm (180.4 in)
- Width: 1,794 mm (70.6 in)
- Height: 1,486 mm (58.5 in)

Originally unveiled as the Beijing Auto C50E, the first generation Senova D50 debuted on the 2014 Beijing Auto Show, and was launched on to the China car market in H2 2014. The C50E was planned to be sold under the Senova brand name with the original designation being D150. Prices of the D50 starts from 74,800 yuan to 119,800 yuan. The D50 is powered by a Mitsubishi-sourced 1.5-litre petrol engine produced by Shenyang Mitsubishi with 163 hp (122 kW; 165 PS) and 225 N⋅m (166 lb⋅ft; 23 kg⋅m). The engine is mated to a 5-speed manual gearbox or CVT.

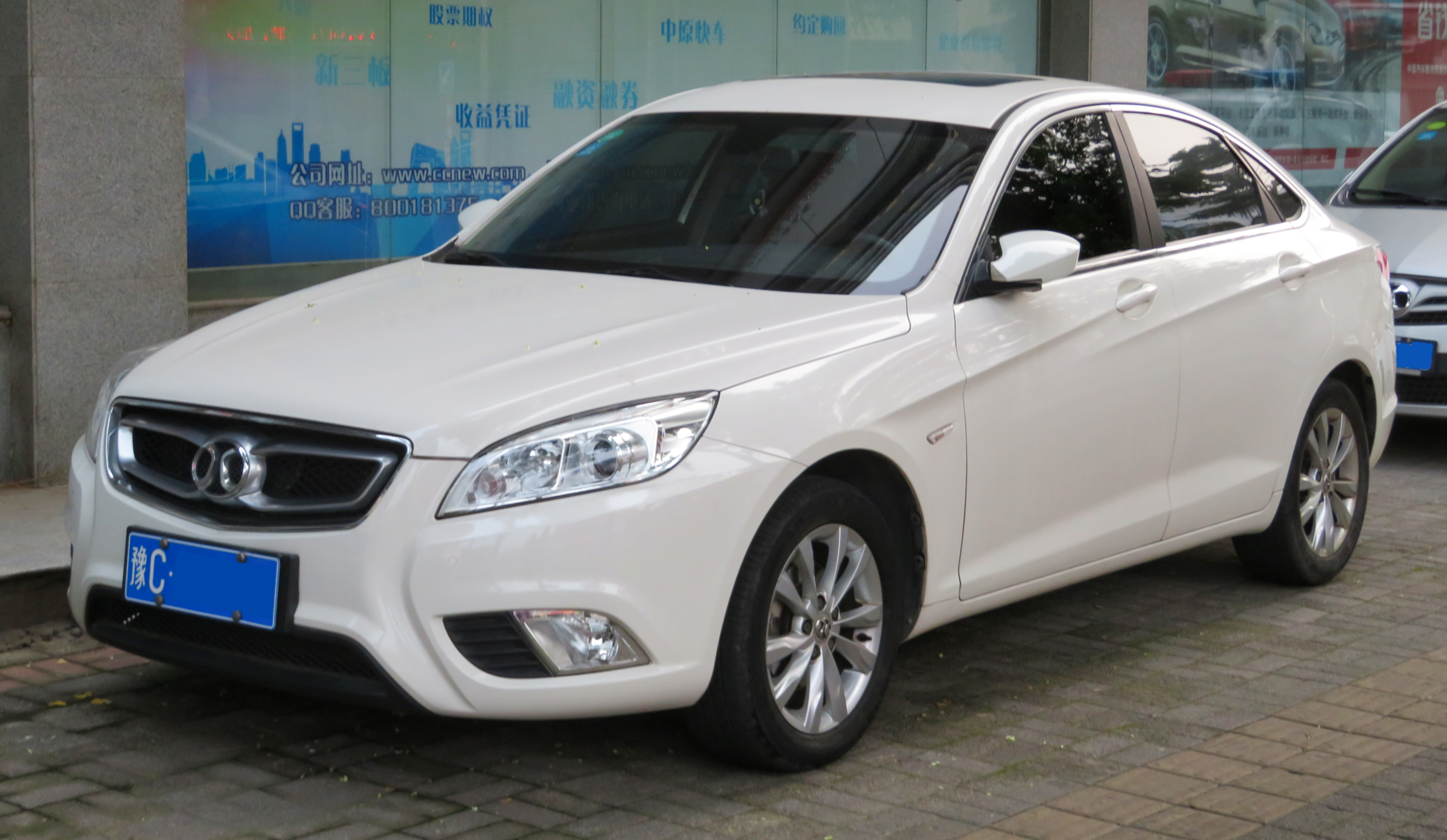
Senova D50 front

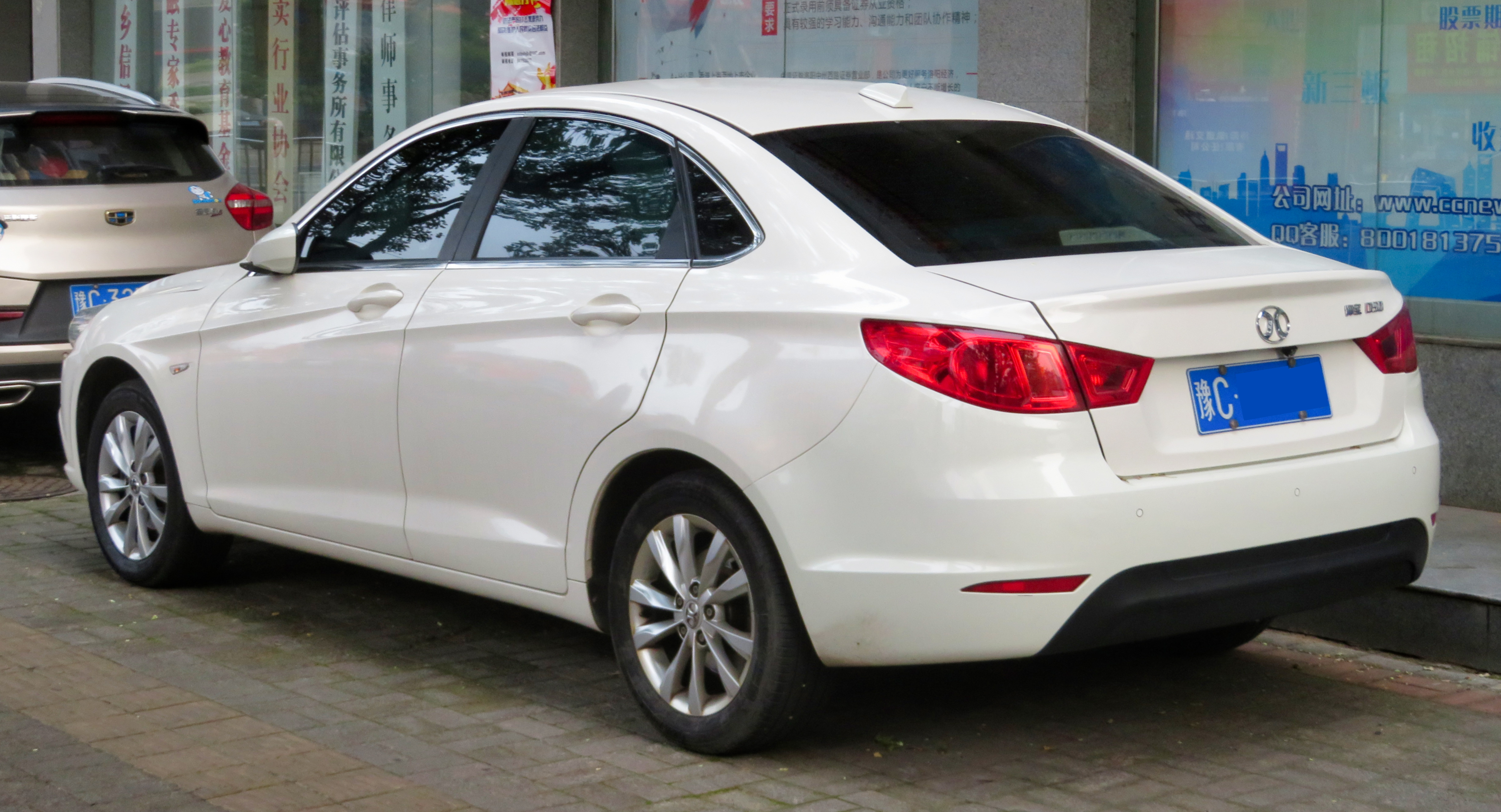
Senova D50 rear

=== BJEV EU260/EU300/EU400 (electric version) ===
Originally the Beijing Auto Senova EV300, the electric car based on the Beijing Auto Senova D50 sedan was later renamed to EU under the BJEV brand. Beijing Auto previewed an EV300 concept on the 2015 Shanghai Auto Show, with a new and more aerodynamic front DRG compared to the D50 that it was based on. The Senova EV300 is powered by an electric motor producing 136 hp (101 kW; 138 PS) and 240 N⋅m (177 lb⋅ft; 24 kg⋅m) of torque, the electric range is about 200 kilometres (120 mi) with initial pricing before green-car subsidies by central and local governments to start around 200,000 yuan. The EU260 EV debuted on the 2015 Guangzhou Auto Show in China. After the rebranding, the EU260 is manufactured by BAIC BJEV, a subsidiary of the Beijing Auto Industry Corporation (BAIC) that makes electric cars. The EU series includes three different trim levels with different electric range consisting of the BJEV EU260, BJEV EU300, and the BJEV EU400 with the BJEV EU400 discontinued after the second generation D50 was launched. As their model names suggests, each of the three models run on 260 kilometres, 300 kilometres, and 400 kilometres of range respectively.

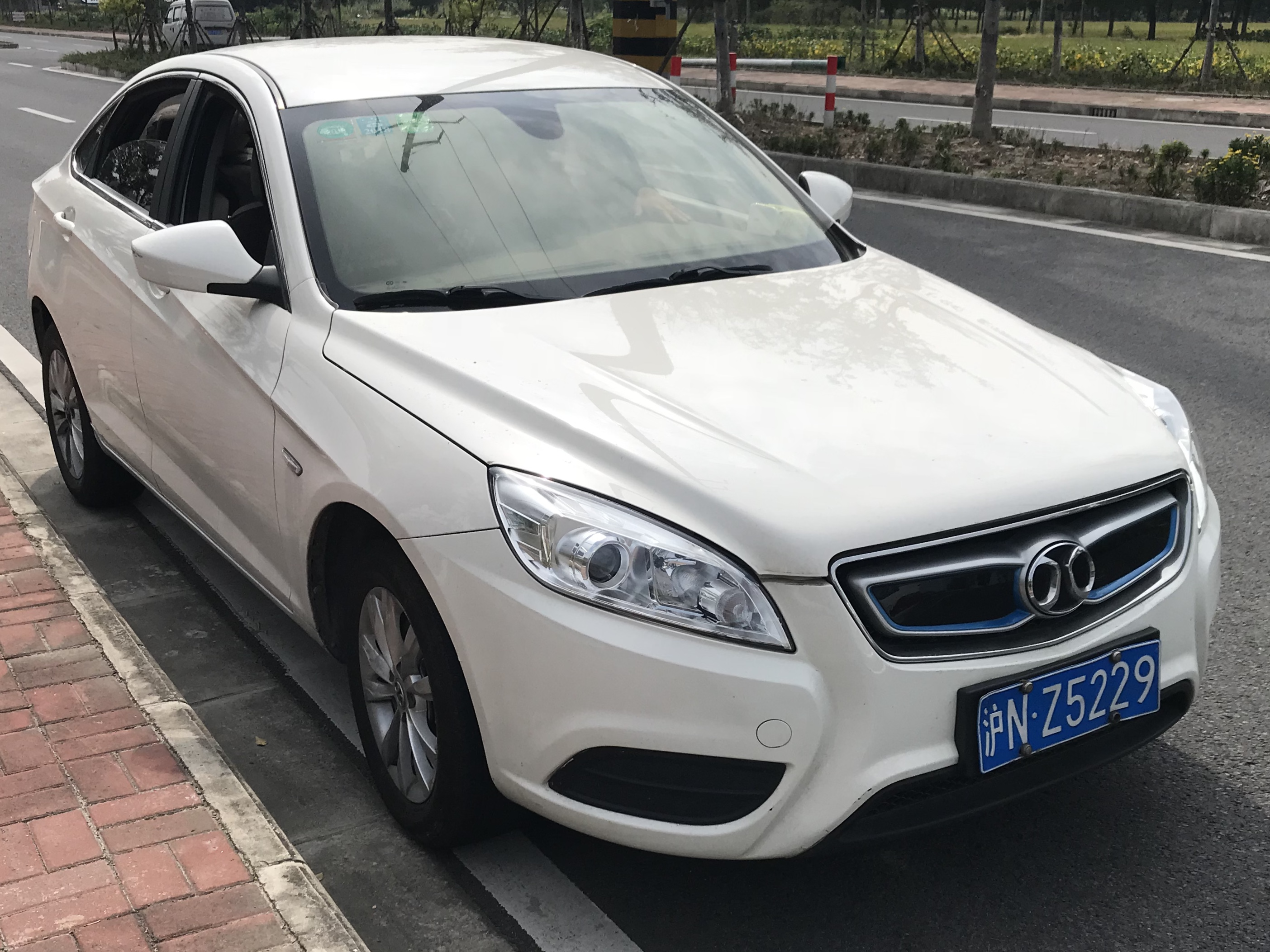
BJEV EU260 front

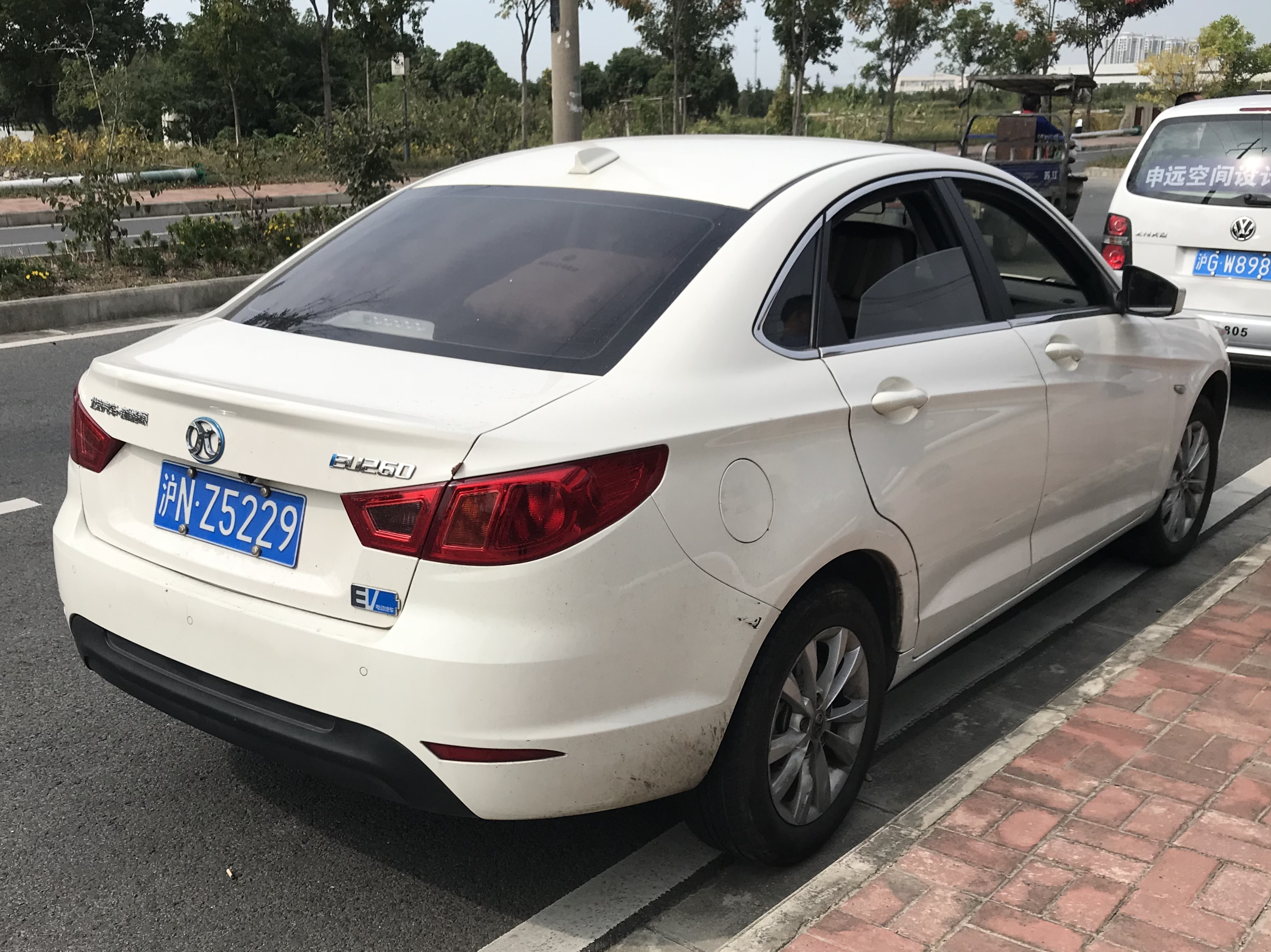
BJEV EU260 rear

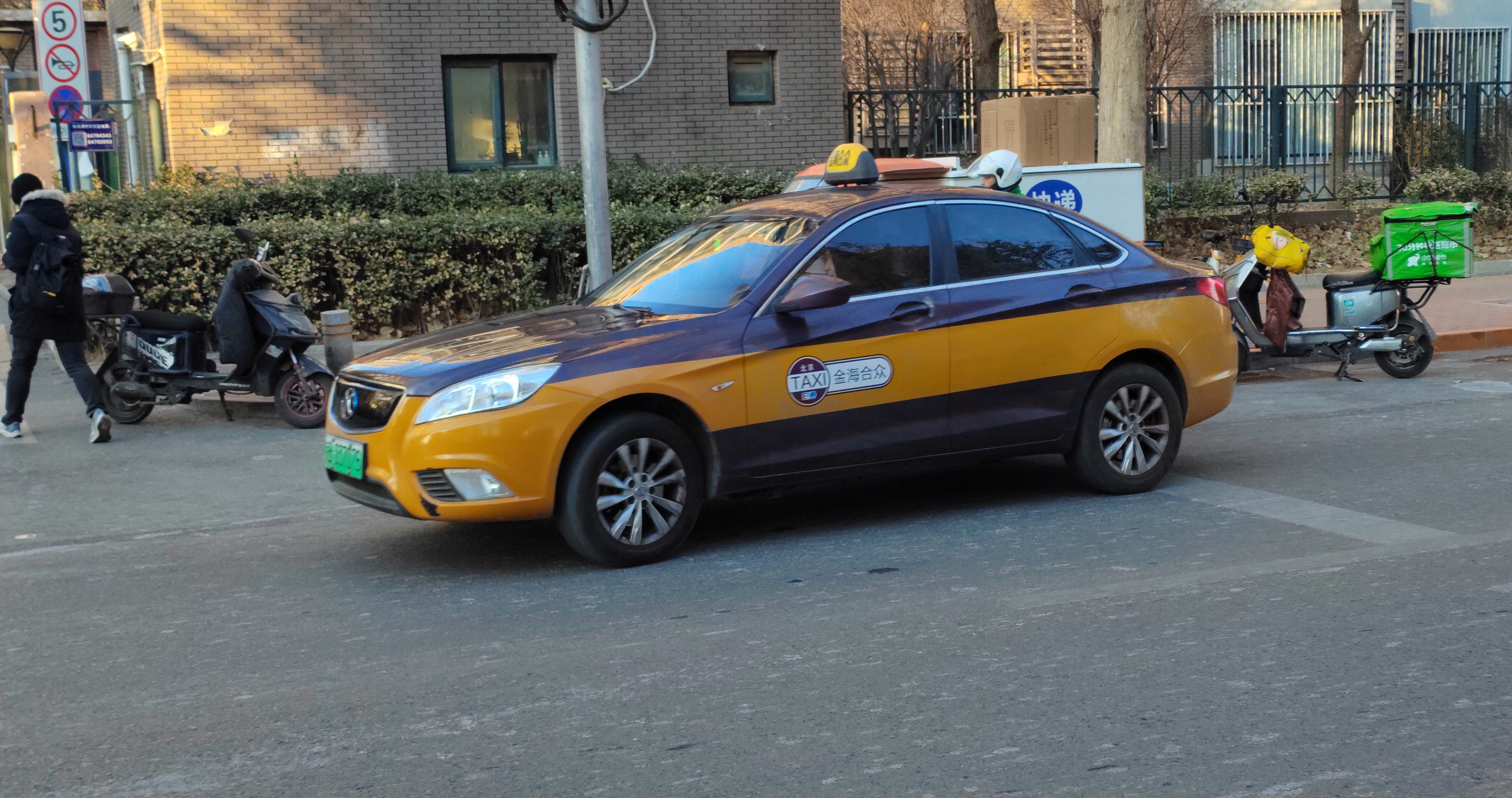
BJEV EU300 taxi (blue and yellow)

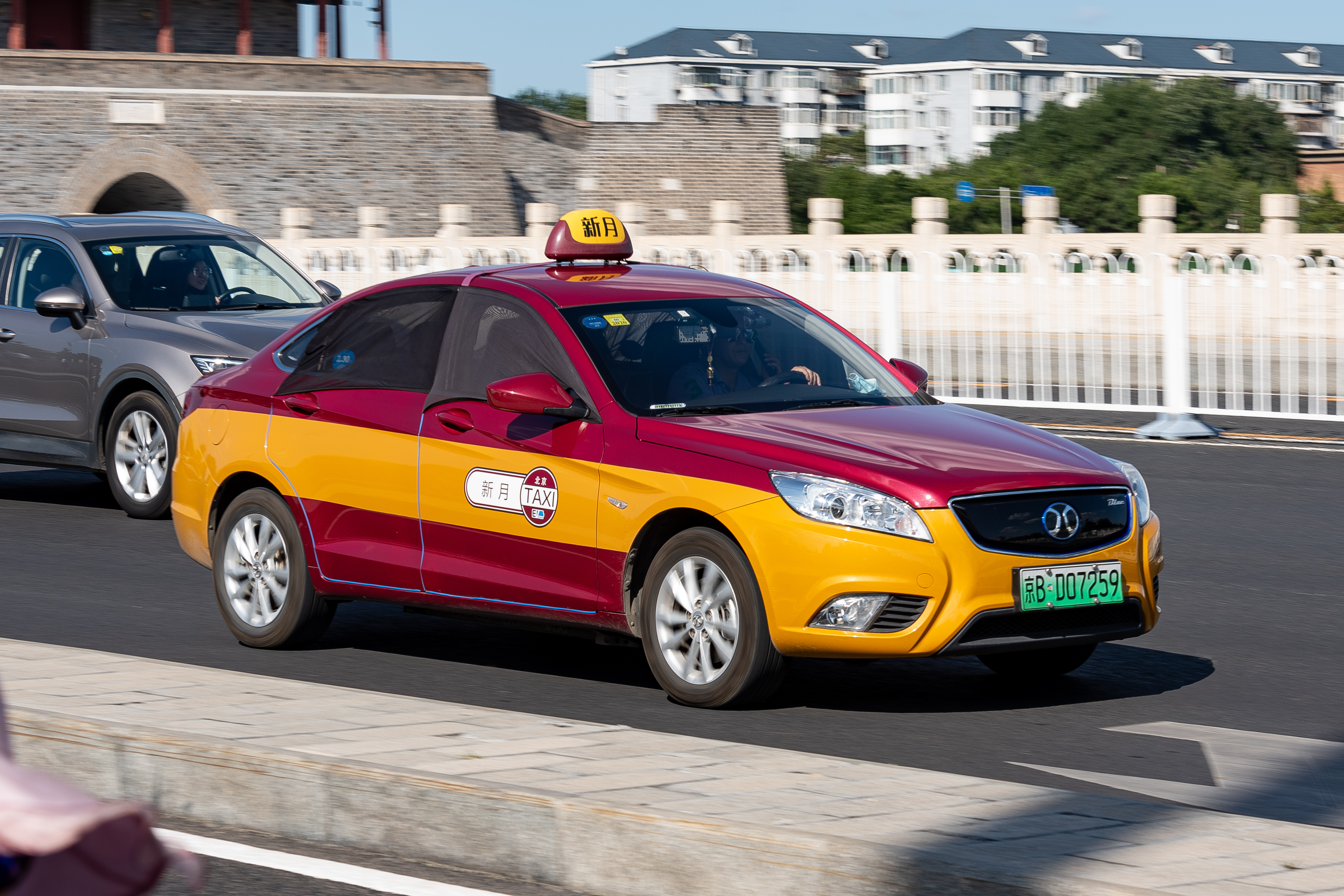
BJEV EU300 taxi (red and yellow)

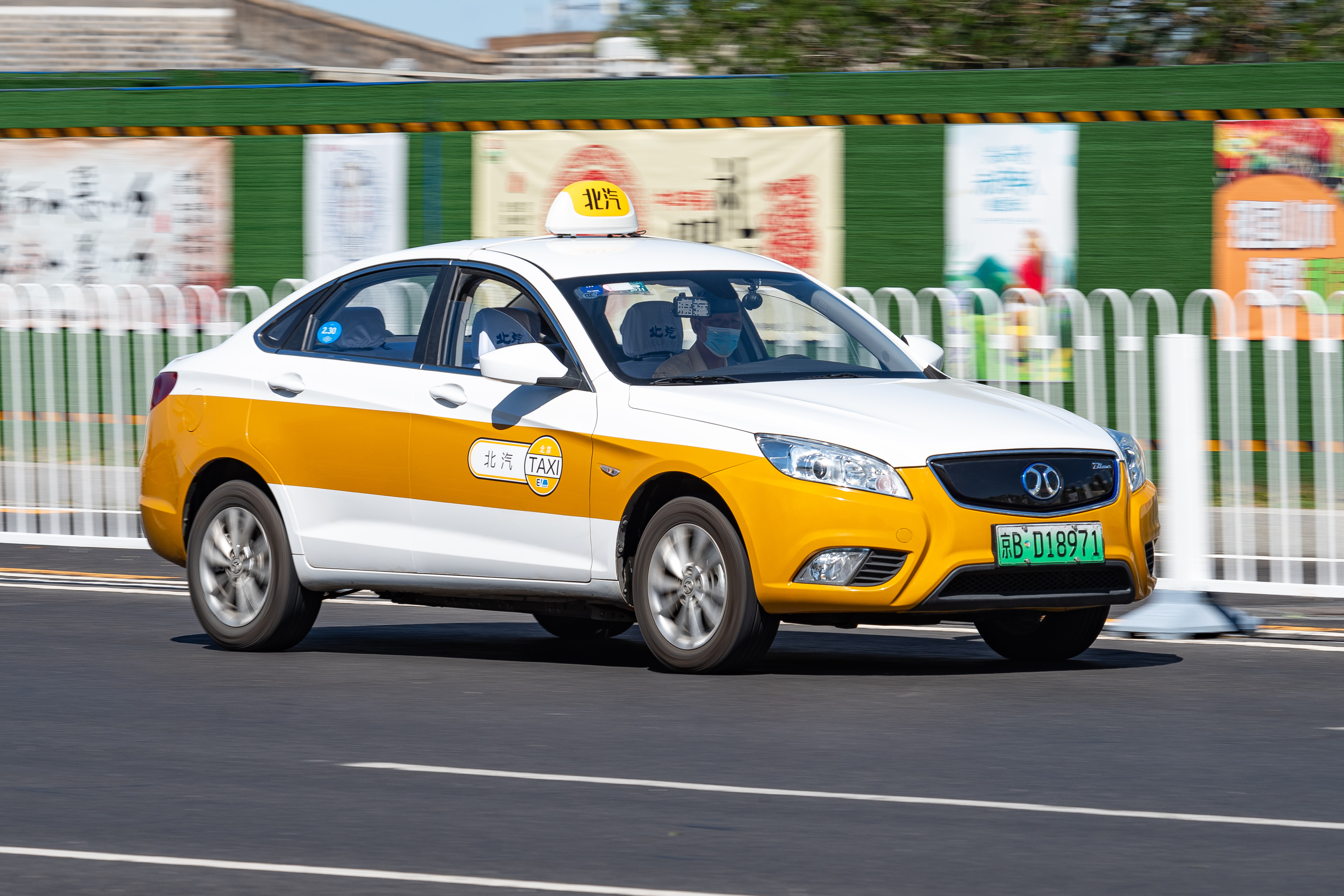
BJEV EU300 taxi (white and yellow)

== Second generation (2017) ==
Second generation
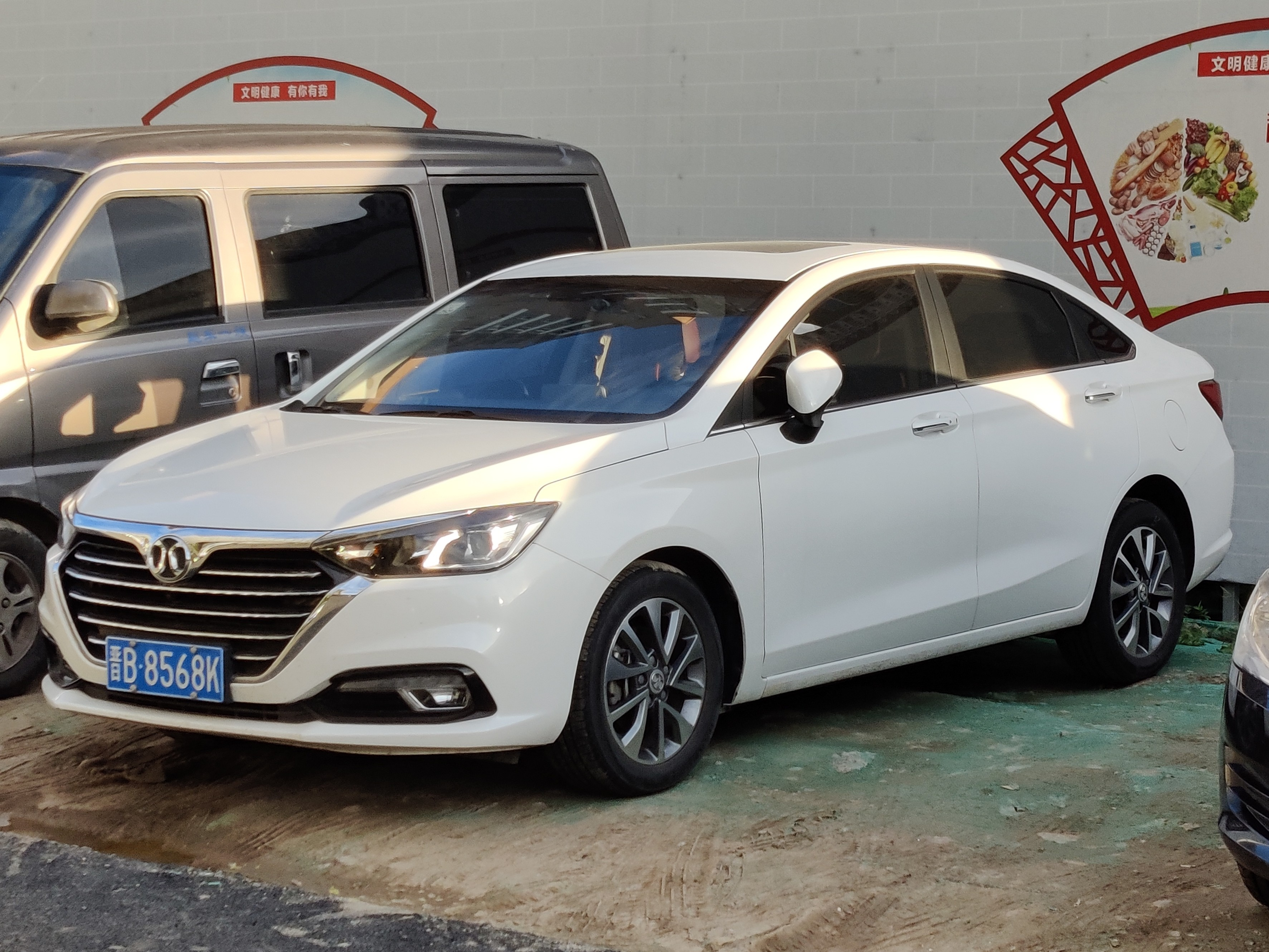

Overview
- Also called: Beijing U5; BJEV/Beijing EU5 (electric version); Beijing U5 Plus; BAIC U5 Plus
- Production: 2017–present 2018–2025 (Beijing EU5)
- Model years: 2018–present
- Assembly: China

Body and chassis
- Class: Compact car (C)
- Body style: 4-door sedan
- Layout: Front-engine, front-wheel-drive
- Related: Changhe A6

Powertrain
- Engine: 1.5 L A151 I4 (petrol)
- Electric motor: One 160 kW (215 hp; 218 PS)
- Transmission: 5-speed manual CVT automatic
- Battery: 53.5 kWh LFP (EU5 Short Range); 60.2 kWh LFP (EU5 Mid Range); 60.7 kWh LFP (EU5 Long Range)
- Electric range: 416 km (258 mi) (EU5 Short Range); 460 km (290 mi) (EU5 Mid Range); 501 km (311 mi) (EU5 Long Range)

Dimensions
- Wheelbase: 2,670 mm (105 in)
- Length: 4,630 mm (182 in)
- Width: 1,820 mm (72 in)
- Height: 1,480 mm (58 in)

The second generation Beijing Auto Senova D50 was unveiled on the 2017 Shanghai Auto Show in April 2017, with the initial market launch planned to be in June 2017. However, the launch of the second generation Beijing Auto Senova D50 for the Chinese car market was later postponed to be on November 8 with prices ranging from 67,900 yuan to 96,900 yuan. Power of the second generation D50 comes from a 1.5-litre inline-four petrol engine producing 116 hp (87 kW; 118 PS) and 147 N⋅m (108 lb⋅ft; 15 kg⋅m) mated to a 5-speed manual gearbox or a CVT automatic gearbox. A 1.5-litre inline-four turbo petrol engine producing 150 hp (112 kW; 152 PS) and 210 N⋅m (155 lb⋅ft; 21 kg⋅m) was added later.

As of 2020, the second generation model was later renamed to Beijing U5 after the launch of the revamped Beijing brand.

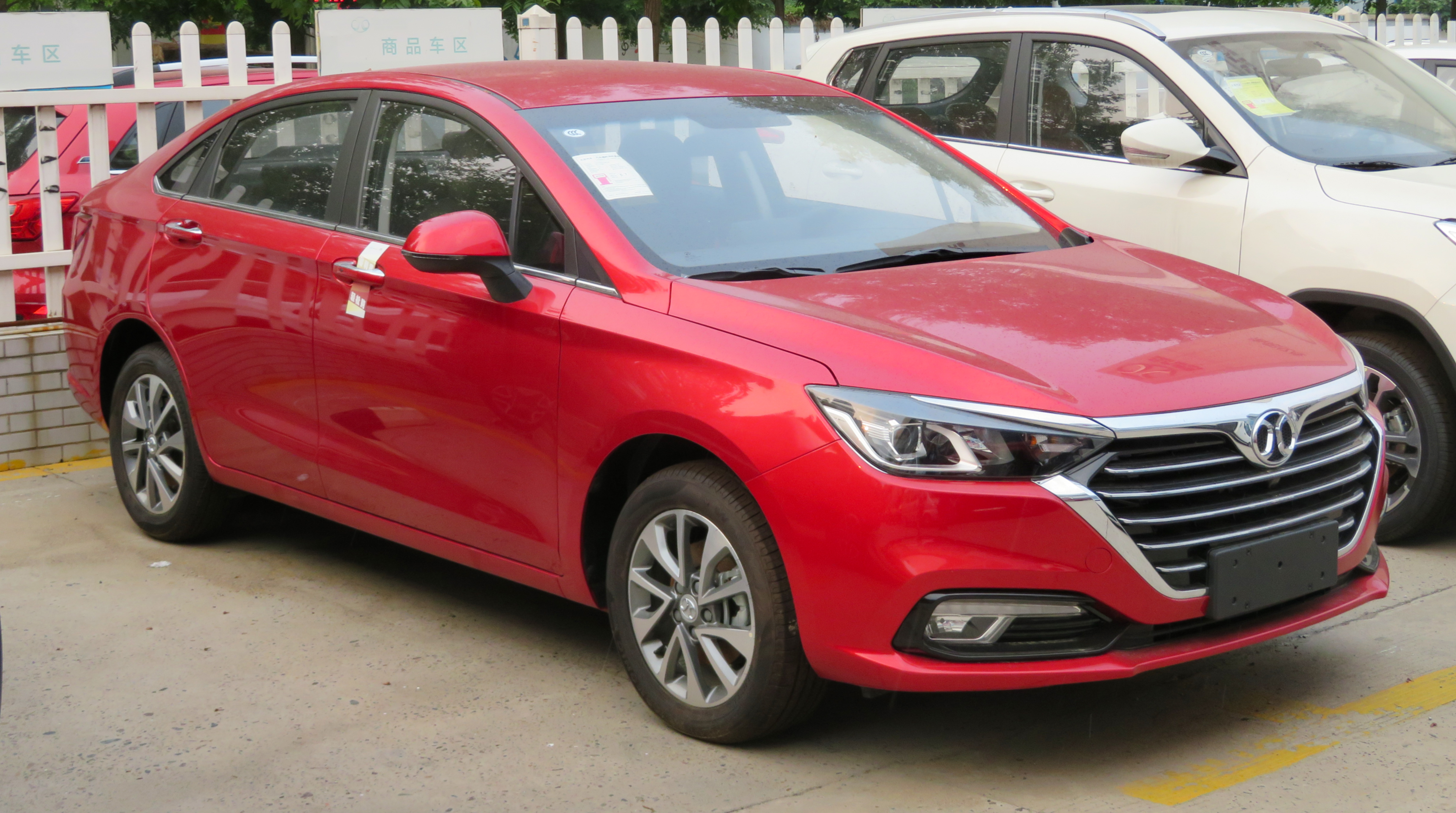
Senova D50 II

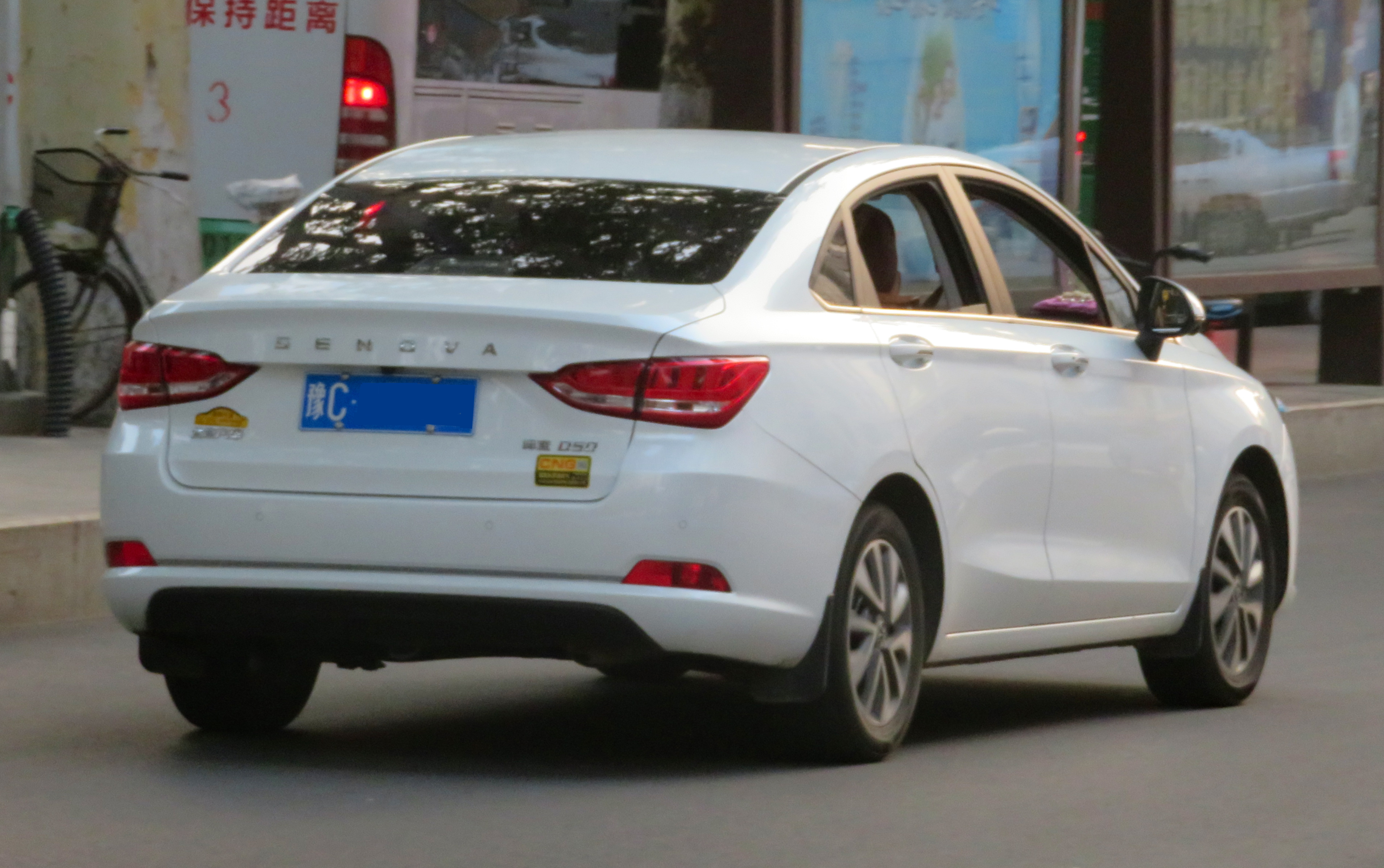
Senova D50 II rear

=== Beijing U5 Plus ===
The U5 received a facelift for the 2021 model year called the U5 Plus. The Beijing U5 Plus debuted during the 2021 Shanghai Auto Show featuring slightly revised front and completely redesigned rear. The interior is equipped with a 7-inch display on the center console and a 12.3 inch high resolution dashboard display.

The power of the U5 Plus is a 1.5-litre engine producing 116 hp (87 kW; 118 PS) and 148 N⋅m (109 lb⋅ft; 15 kg⋅m) or a 1.5-litre turbo engine producing 150 hp (112 kW; 152 PS) and 210 N⋅m (155 lb⋅ft; 21 kg⋅m). Transmission options include a 5-speed manual transmission, a 6-speed manual transmission, and CVT gearbox.

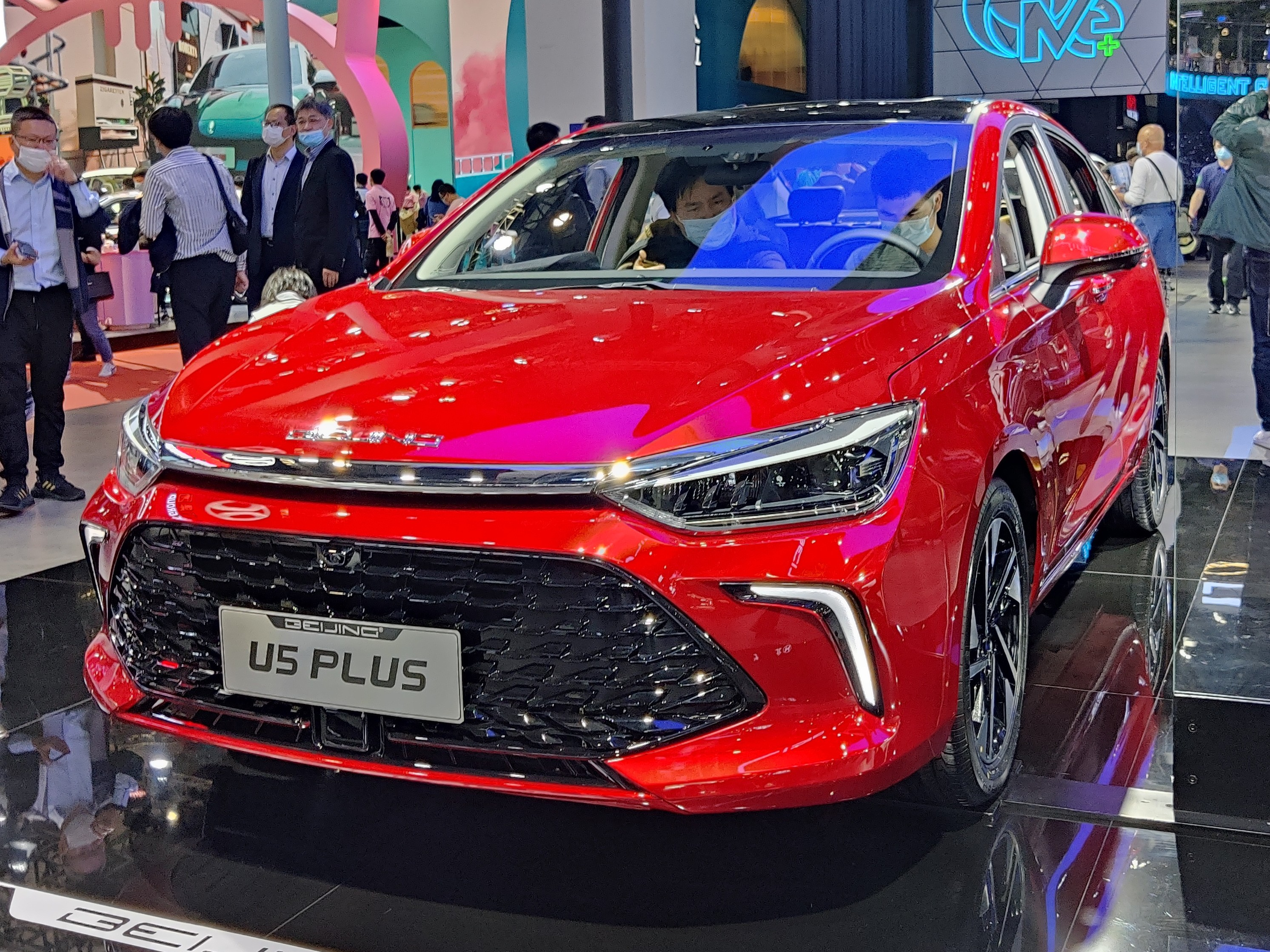
Beijing U5 Plus

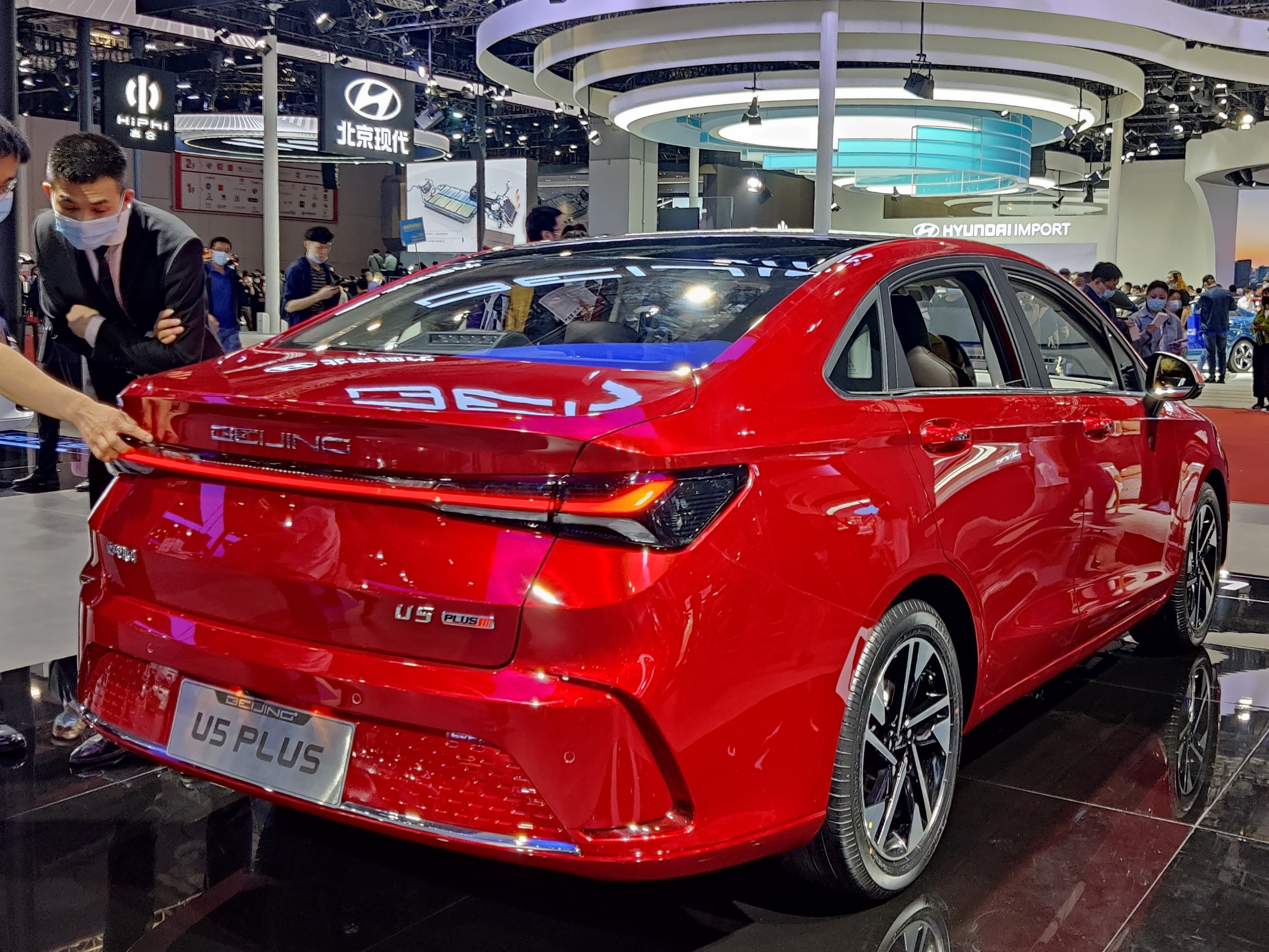
Beijing U5 Plus rear

=== Beijing/BJEV EU5 (electric version) ===
Same as the first generation Beijing Auto Senova D50 sedan, the second generation D50 also spawned an electric version manufactured and sold under the BJEV brand. The electric version of the second generation D50 was also sold under the EU series, and this time it was sold alongside the first-generation-D50-based EU260 as the EU5 replacing the also first-generation-D50-based EU400.

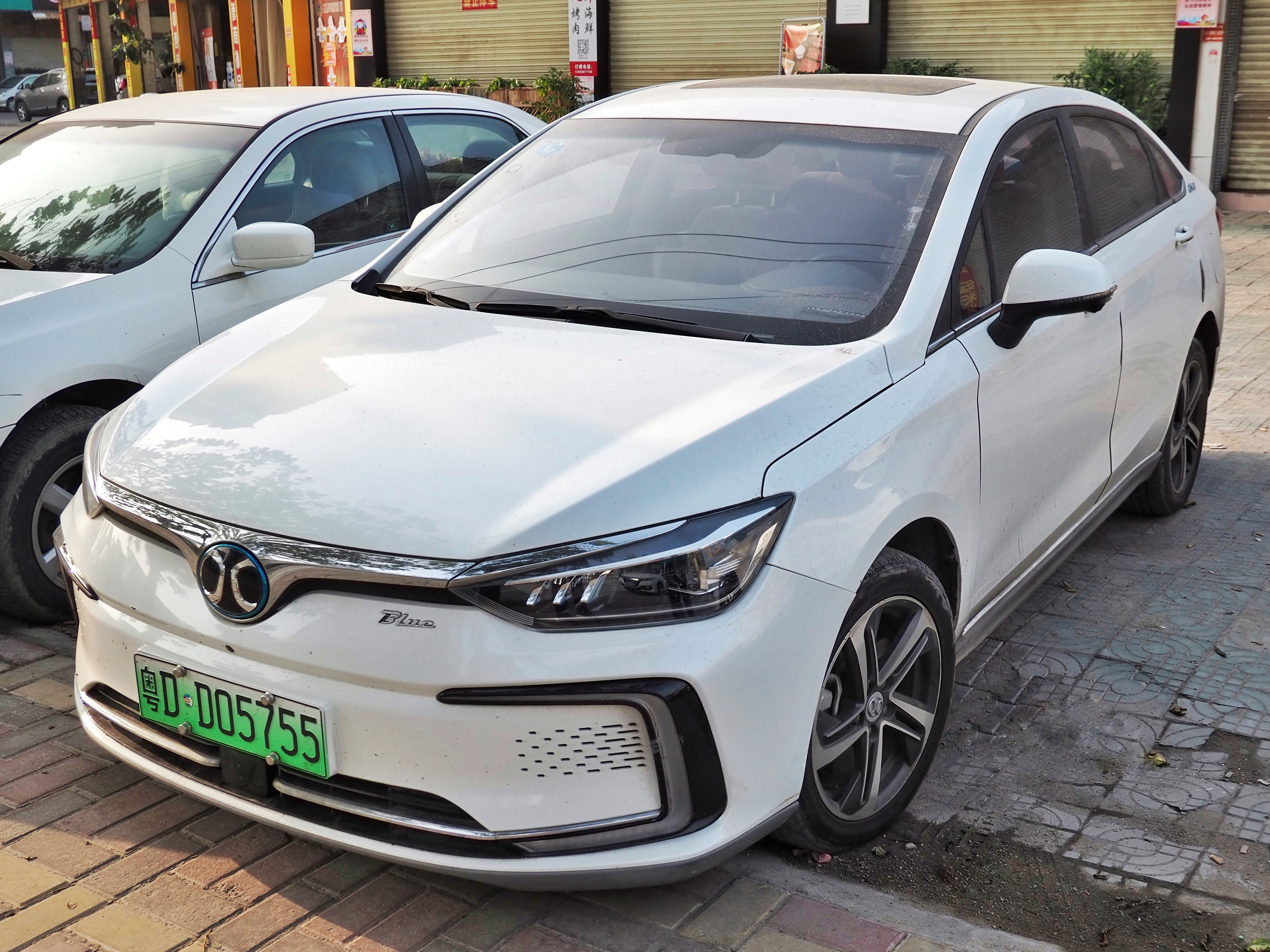
BJEV EU5 front

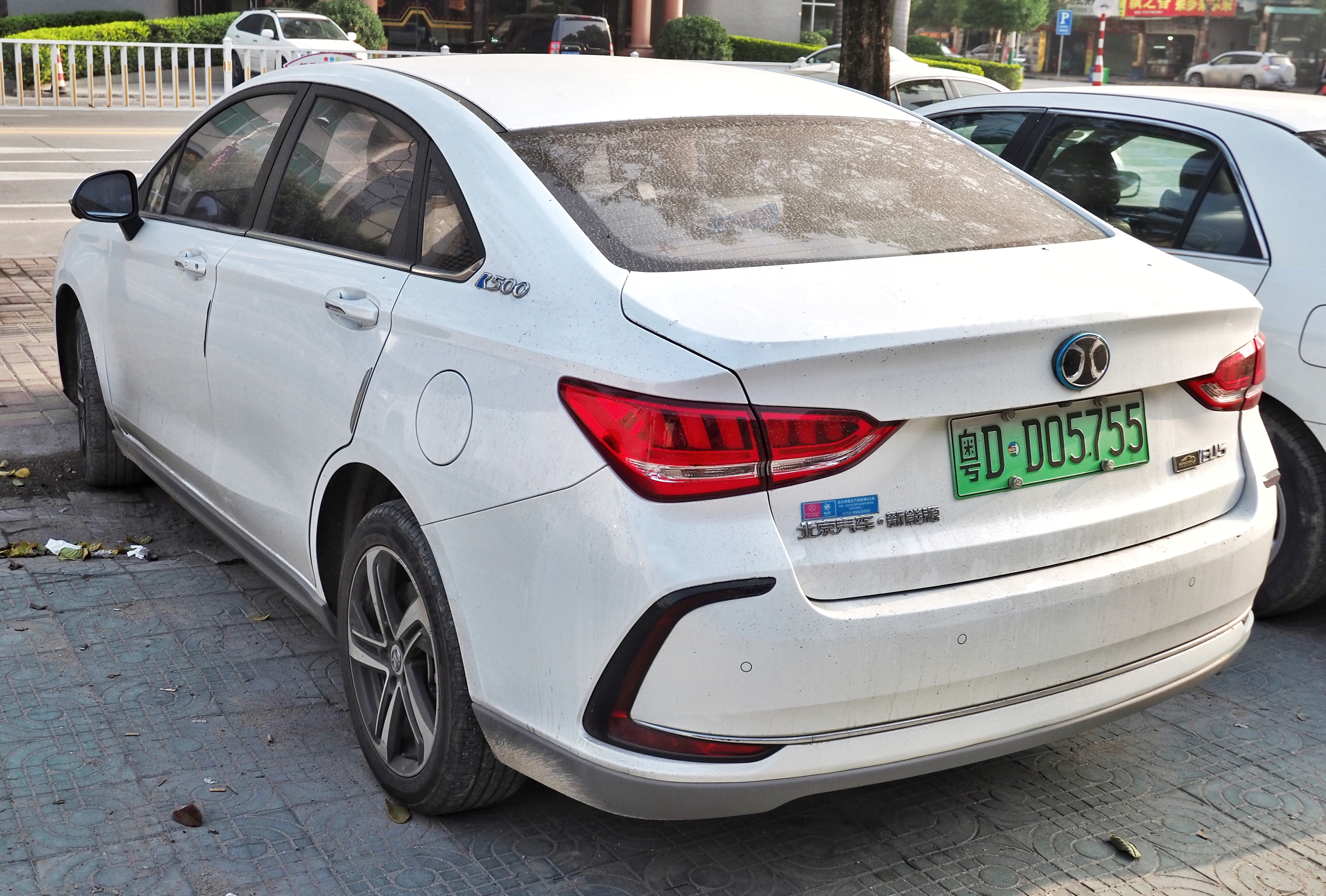
BJEV EU5 rear

==== 2020 rebadge ====
As of 2020, following the rebranding of the Beijing brand, the BJEV EU5 was rebadged with the Beijing brand while the name remains unchanged, fitting into U-themed sedan range as an electric variant of the Beijing U5 sedan. The Beijing EU5 is offered in 8 trim levels and is powered by a single electric motor good for 160 kW (210 hp; 220 PS) and 300 N⋅m (221 lb⋅ft) of torque. 3 different range variants of 416 km (258 mi), 460 km (290 mi), and 501 km (311 mi) are available as standard. Prices ranges from 132,900 yuan to 161,900 yuan.The rebadged EU5 also serves as one of Beijing's taxicab vehicles, the other being the EU300 of the previous generation U5. Both vehicles replaced the aging Hyundai Elantra taxi for 2021 onwards in Beijing's taxi fleet. These taxicabs were added in favour of more electric vehicles on Beijing roads which included buses, motorcycles, and scooters to continue minimizing air pollution.

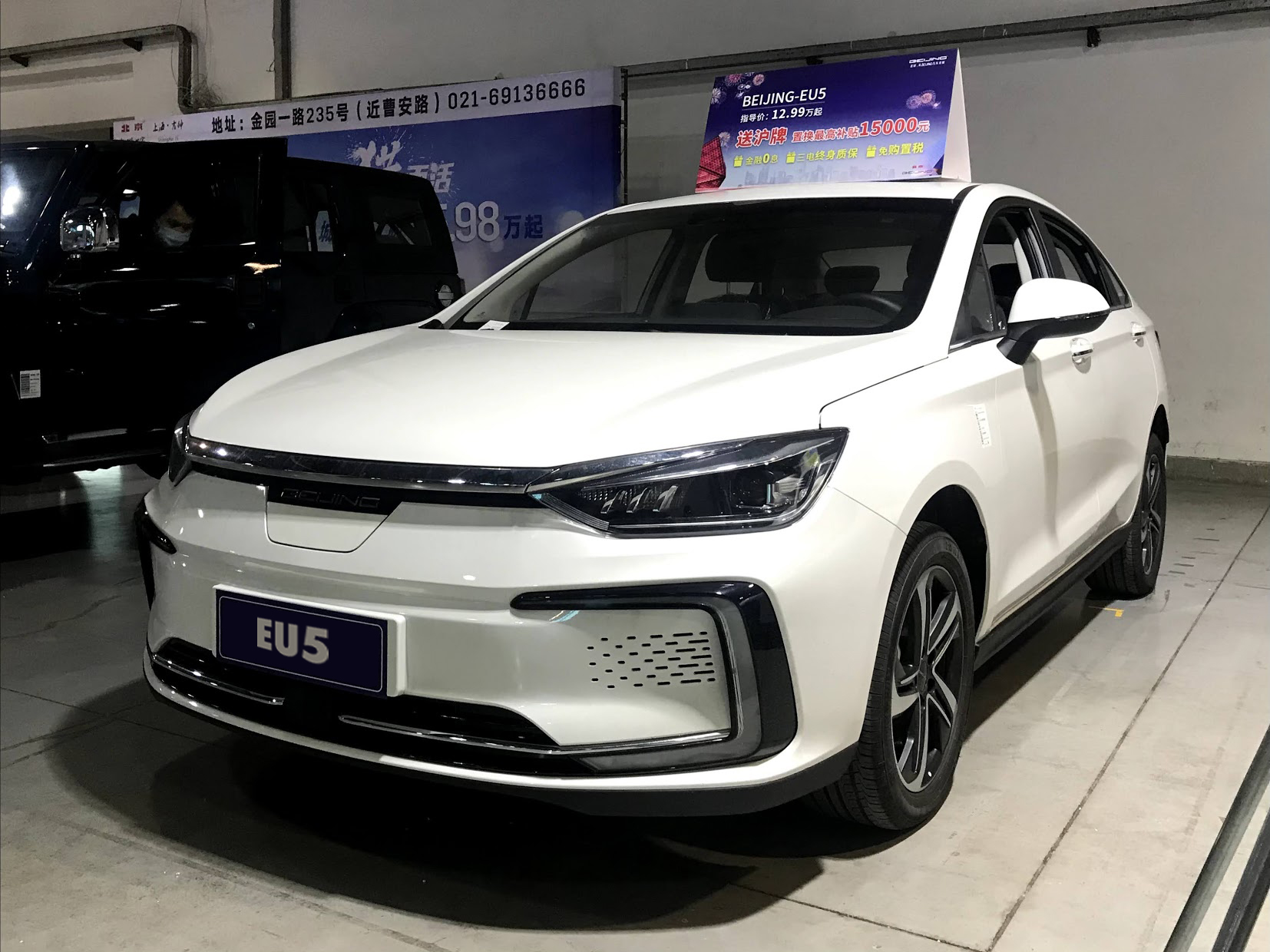
Beijing EU5 front

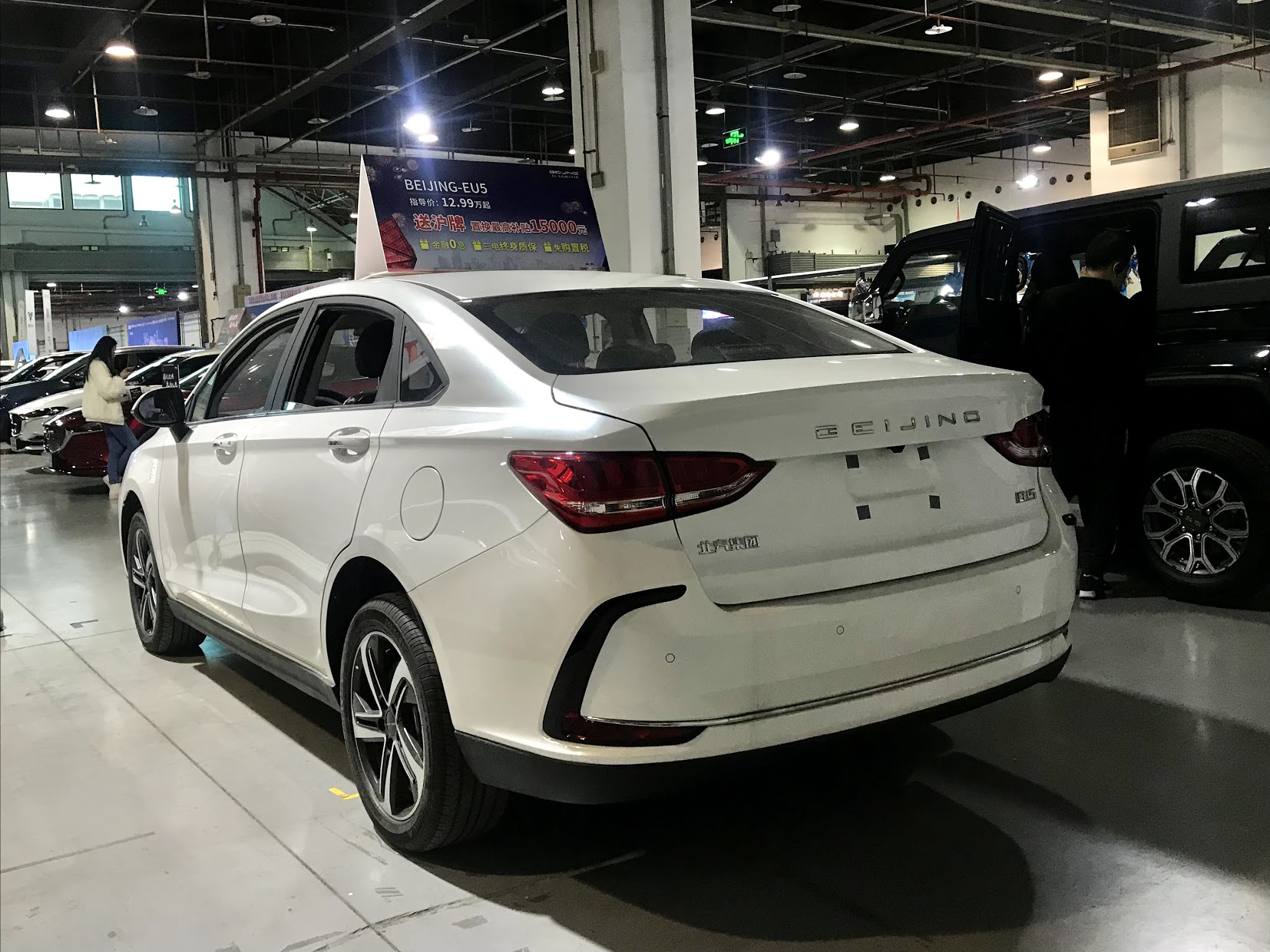
Beijing EU5 rear

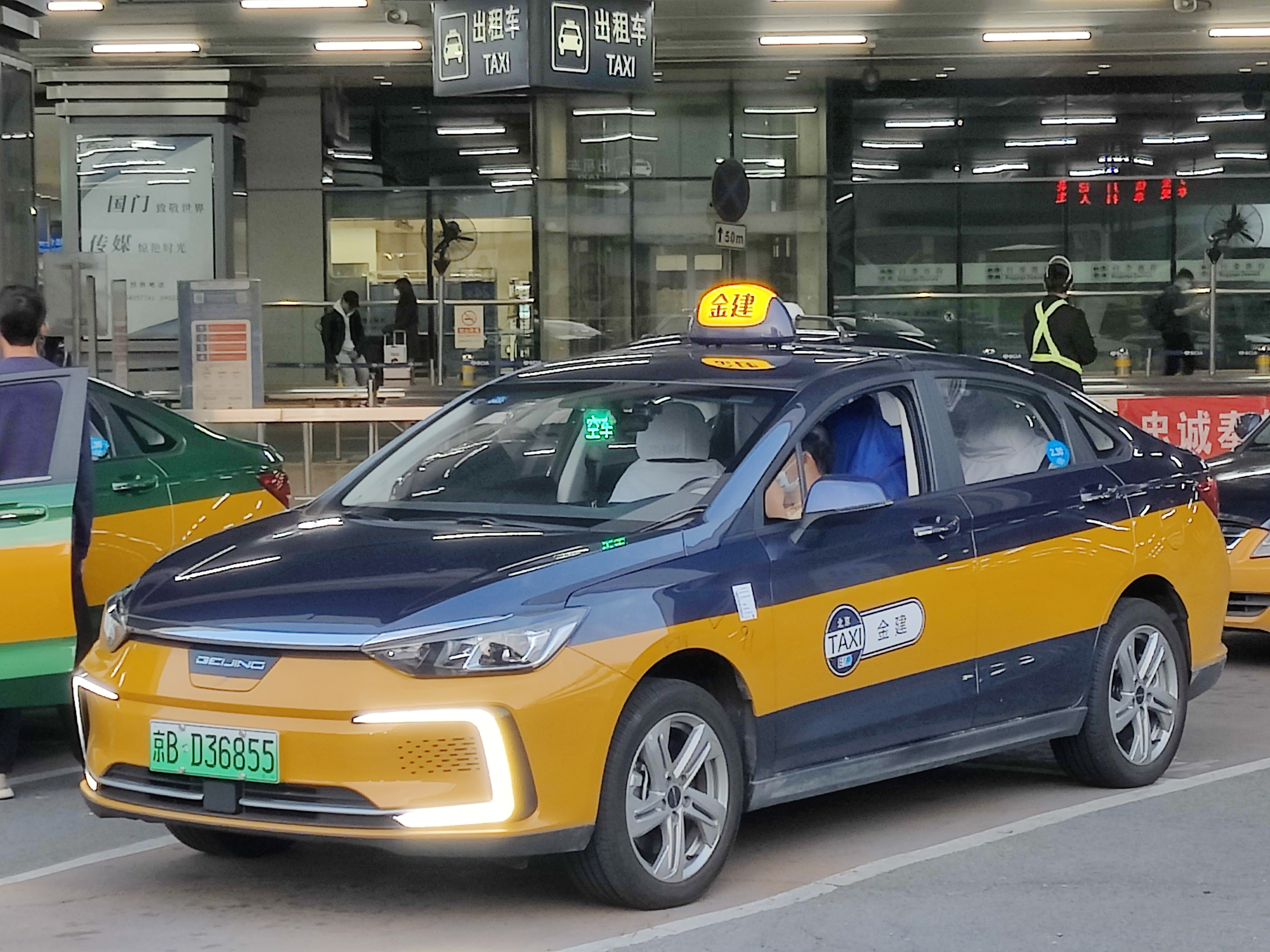
Beijing EU5 taxi (blue and yellow)

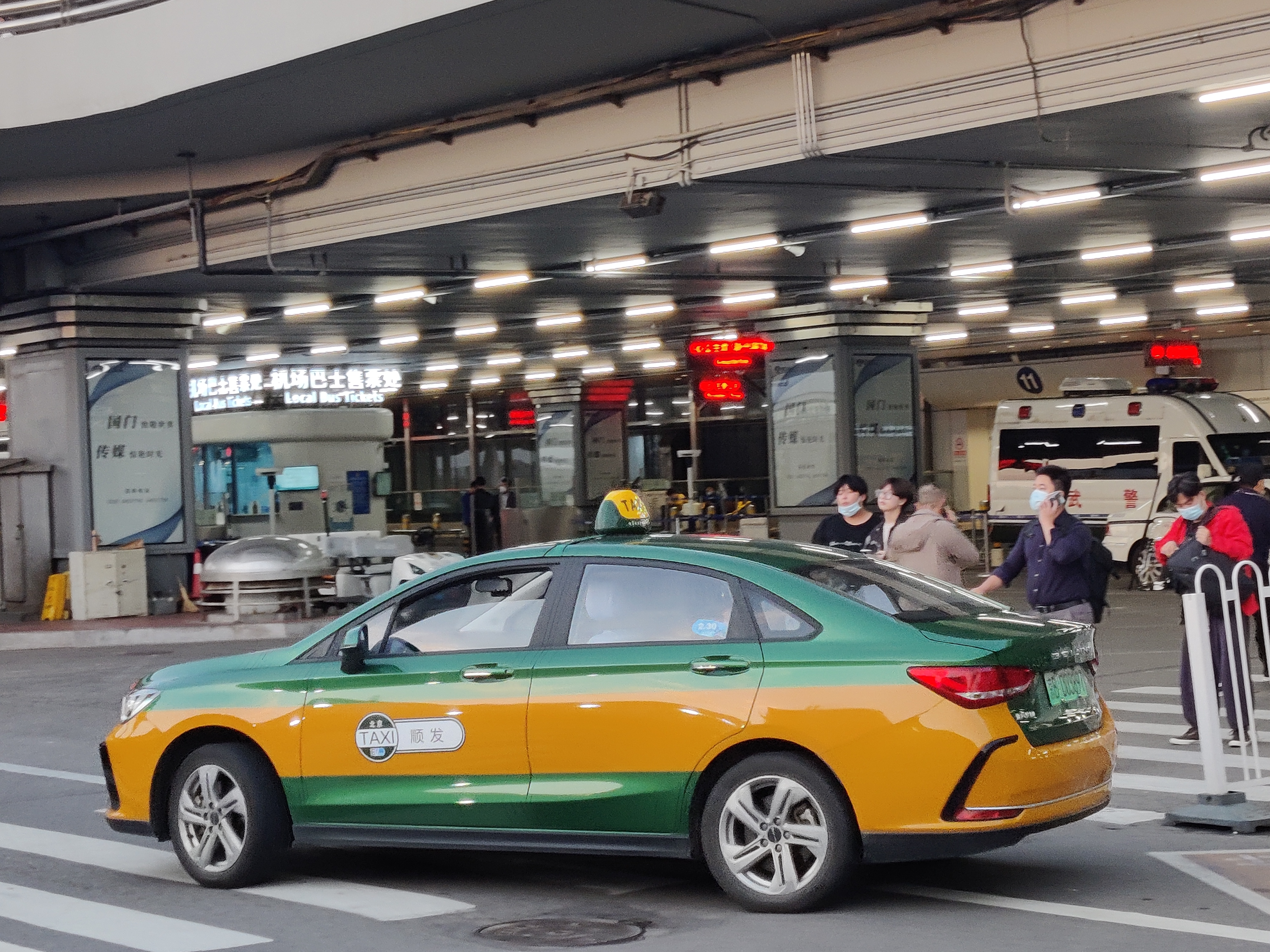
Beijing EU5 taxi (green and yellow)

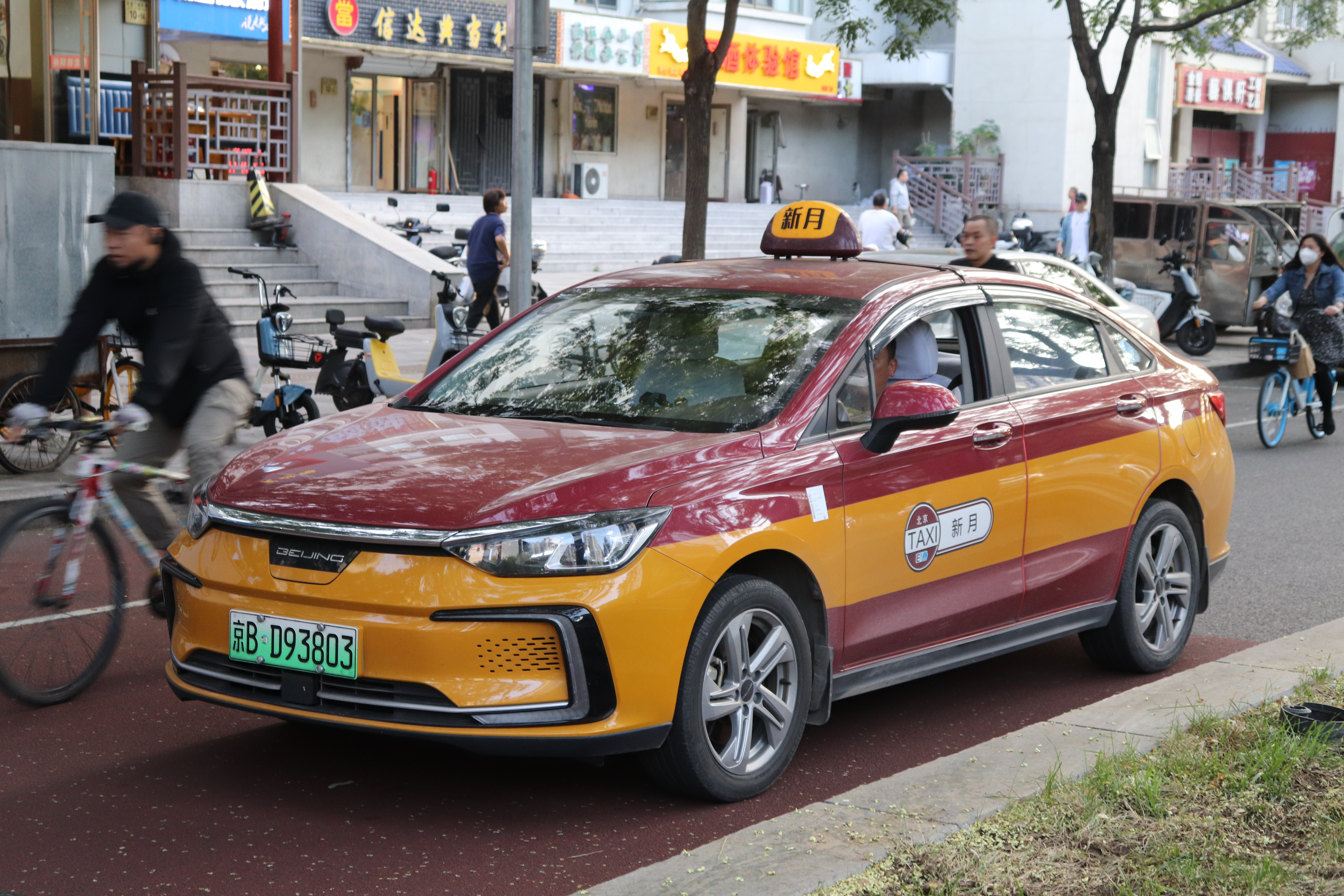
Beijing EU5 taxi (red and yellow)

==== Beijing EU5 Plus (2021) ====
The all-electric Beijing EU5 received a facelift that debuted during the 2021 Auto Shanghai under a new name called the EU5 Plus. The facelift sports a charging port that now resides on the front left fender compared to the previous EU5 which had the charging port located on the nose under the bonnet. Further design tweaks are in line with the U5 Plus petrol-powered version facelift, which are in the areas of the trunk lid, slimmer taillights, and C-shaped headlights with rounded details. The EU5 Plus cabin features two touchscreens, redesigned seats, restyled steering wheel, air deflectors, and HVAC.

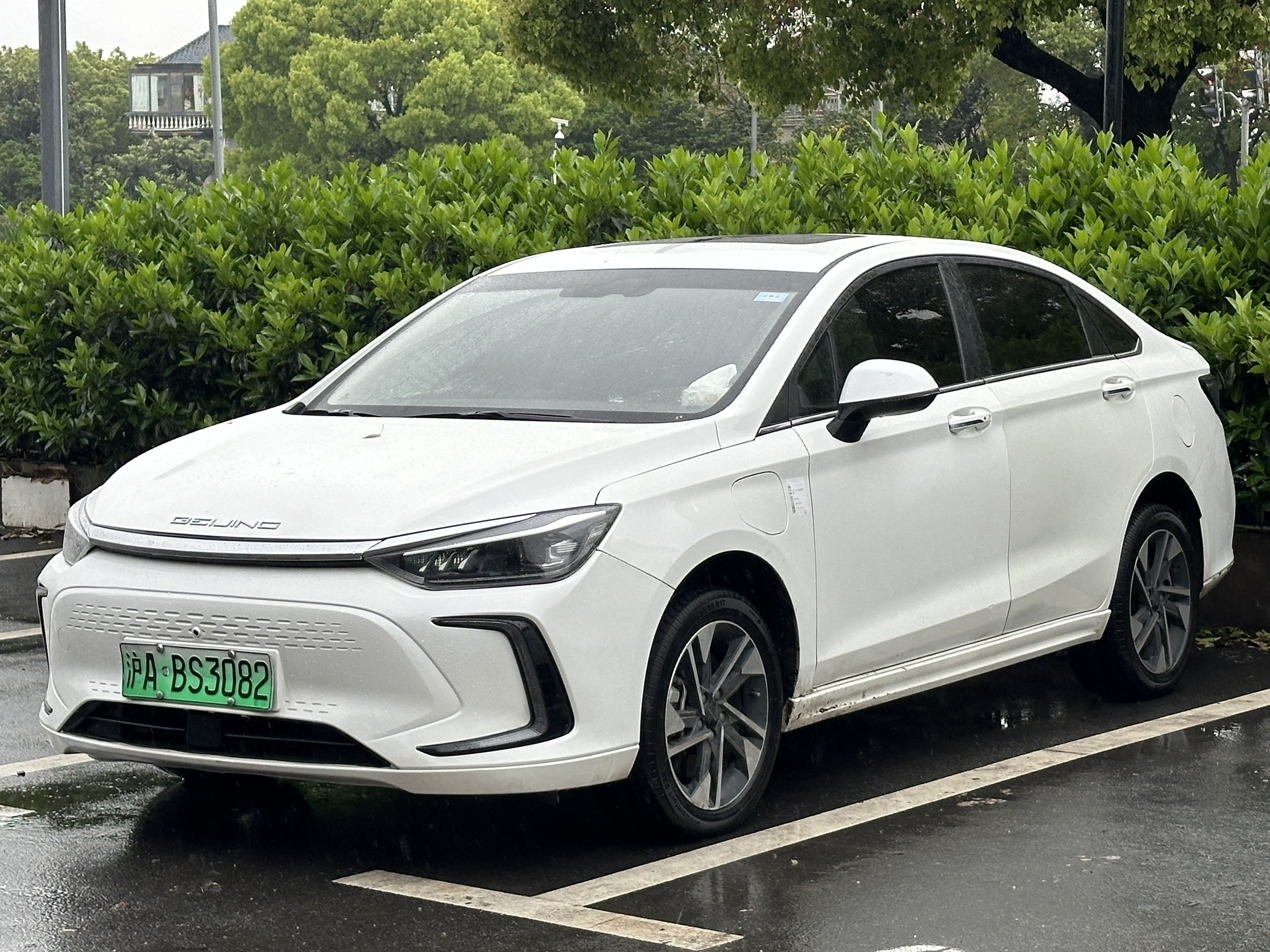
Beijing EU5 Plus front

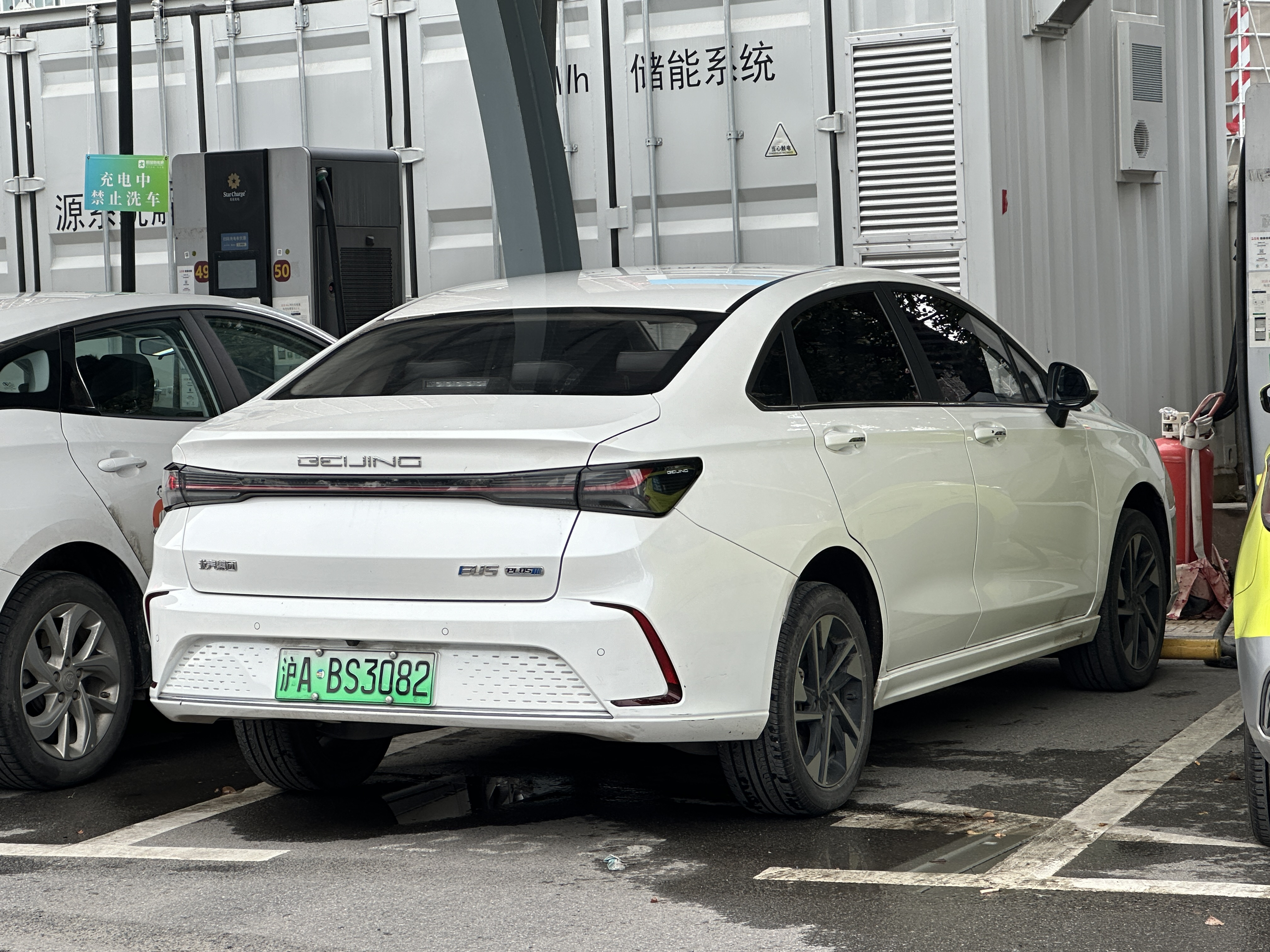
Beijing EU5 Plus rear

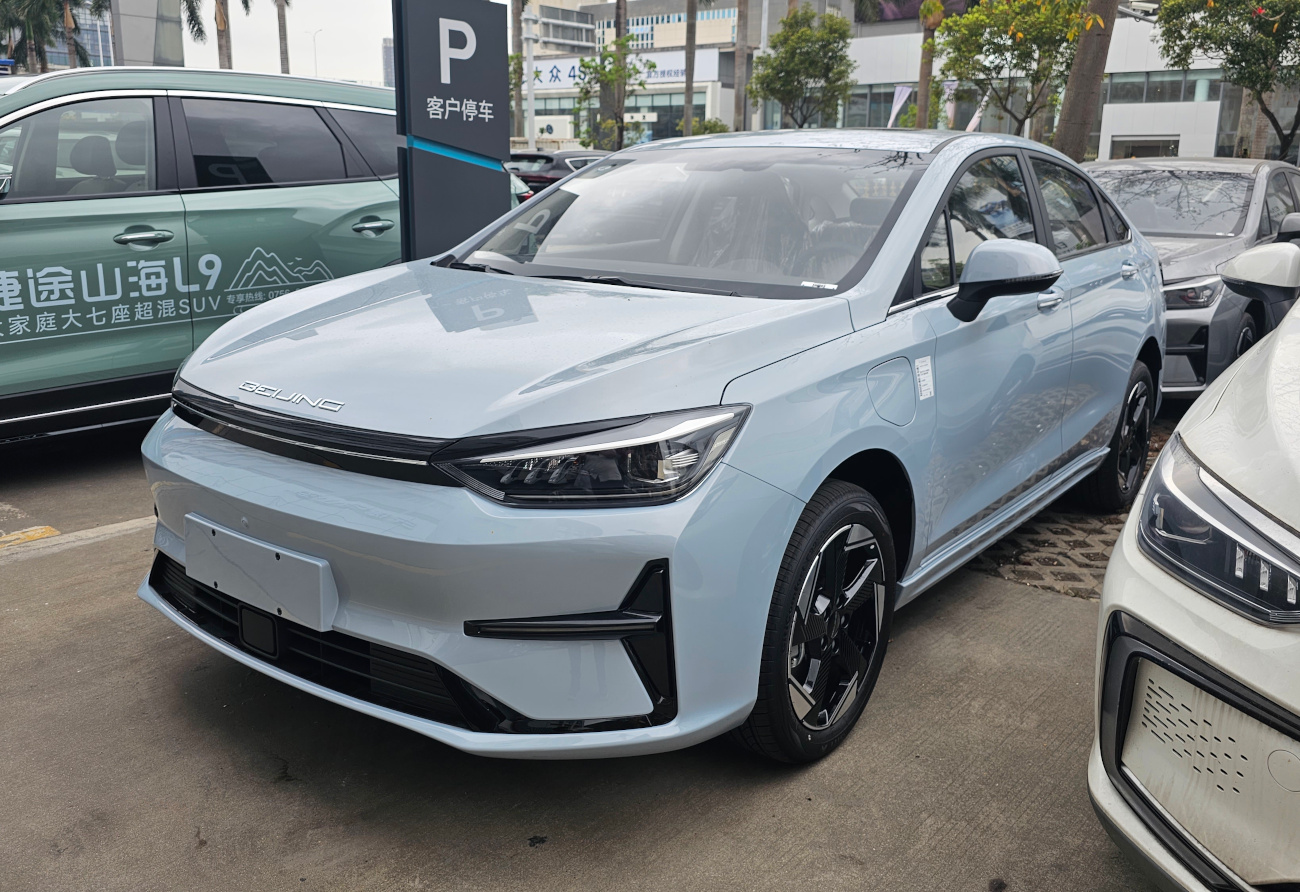
Beijing EU5 Plus (2023 facelift)

== Sales ==
Year	China			
Year	U5	EU5	U5 Plus	EU5 Plus
2023	68	45,348	984	321
2024	—	36,165	479	11
2025	161	17,154	—	1,511
