= Q7 =

Q7 may refer to:

== Media ==
- Q... (TV series) by Spike Milligan on the BBC; "Q7" refers to the third series

== Technology ==
- AN/FSQ-7, the IBM vacuum tube computer for the SAGE air-defense system, where "Q7" was the commonly used nickname
- Qseven, a formfactor for industrial PC-boards

== Transportation ==
- Audi Q7, a German full-size SUV
- Changhe Q7, a Chinese mid-size SUV
- French submarine Farfadet (Q7)
- LNER Class Q7, a class of British 0-8-0 steam locomotives
- Q7 (New York City bus)

== Other ==
- Q7 Wind Farm, an offshore wind farm in the Netherlands, now renamed to Princess Amalia Wind Farm
- Quran 7, the 7th chapter of the Islamic Holy book

== See also ==
- 7Q (disambiguation)
