= Borgward BX5 =

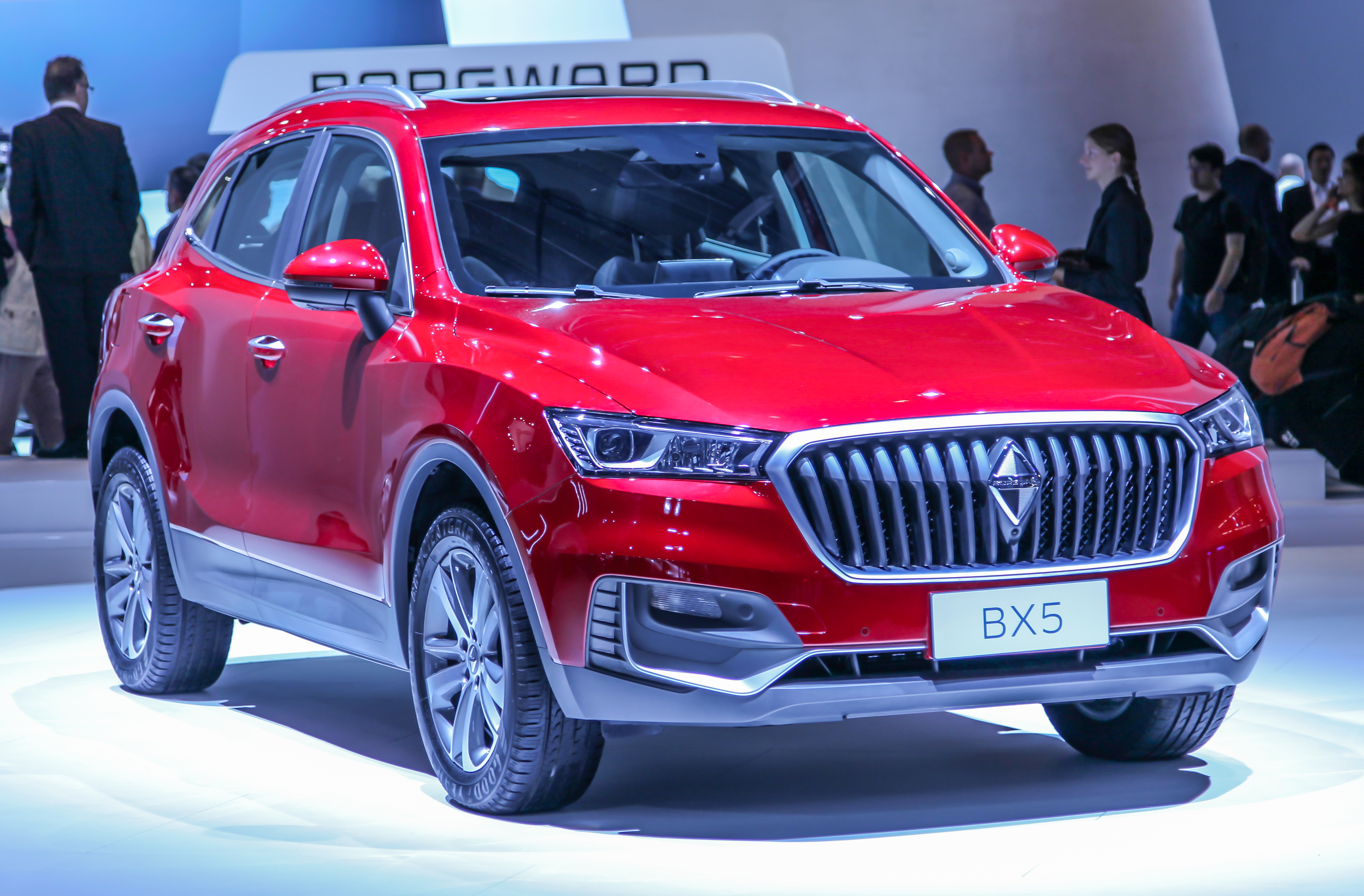

Overview
- Manufacturer: Borgward Group
- Also called: Borgward BX6 (fastback version)
- Production: 2017–2021
- Assembly: China: Miyun, Beijing

Body and chassis
- Class: Subcompact luxury crossover SUV (C)
- Body style: 5-door SUV
- Layout: Front engine, front-wheel-drive; Front engine, all-wheel-drive

Powertrain
- Engine: Petrol: 1.4 L BWE414A I4 turbo; 1.8 L BWE418A I4 turbo; 2.0 L BWE420B I4 turbo
- Transmission: 6-speed manual; 6-speed automatic

Dimensions
- Wheelbase: 2,685 mm (105.7 in)
- Length: 4,490 mm (176.8 in)
- Width: 1,877 mm (73.9 in)
- Height: 1,675 mm (65.9 in)
- Curb weight: 1,500–1,675 kg (3,307–3,693 lb)

The Borgward BX5 is a Sino-German subcompact luxury crossover SUV from the Borgward Group and produced in China by Foton Motor between 2017 and 2021. A fastback version called the Borgward BX6 was later launched. Production of all Borgwards ended in 2021 and the company went bankrupt the following year.

== Overview ==
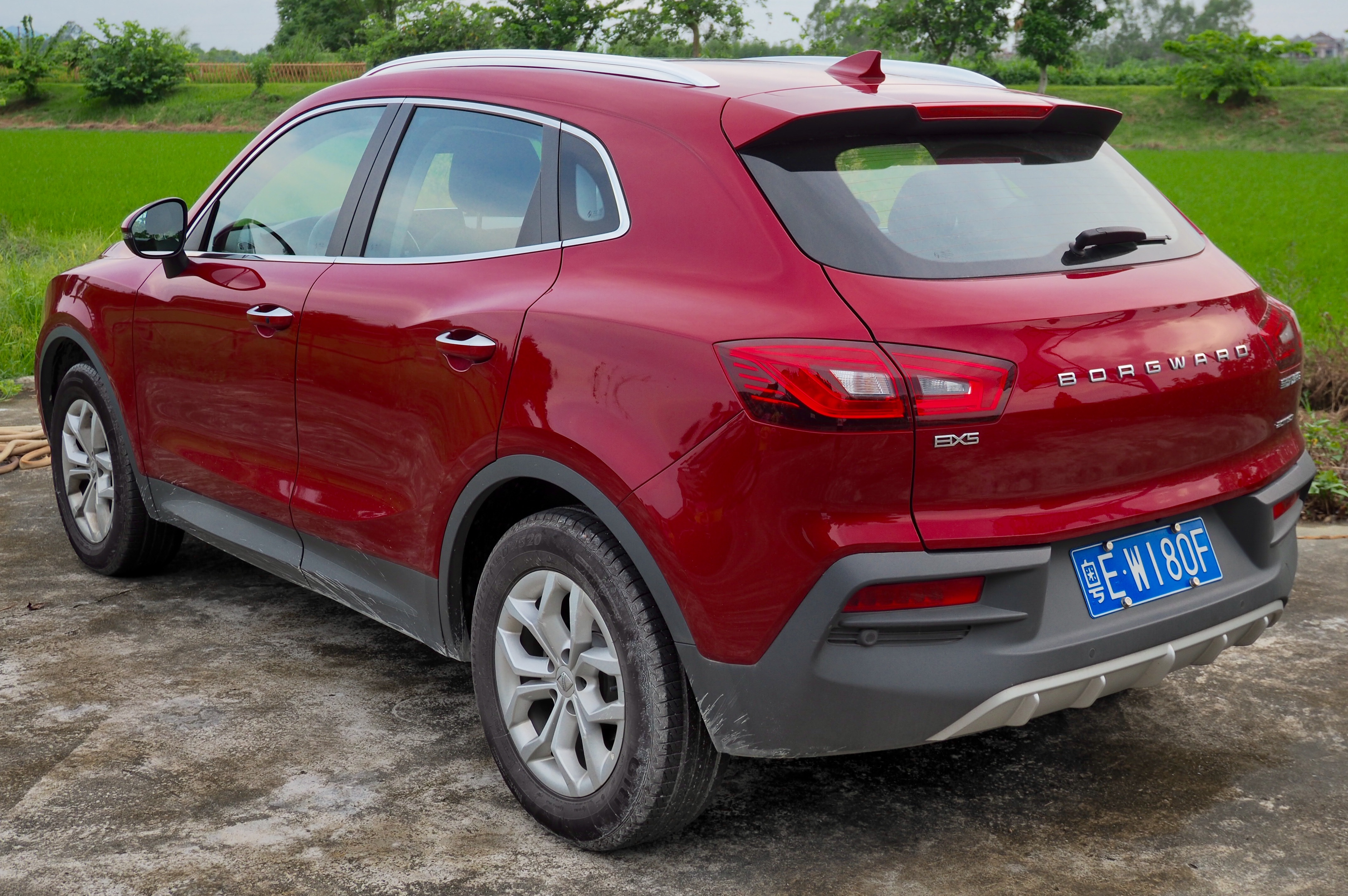
Rearview

The world premiere of the Borgward BX5 was at the 2016 Geneva Motor Show. Like the larger BX7, the BX5 was initially produced for the Chinese market. The market launch took place on 24 March 2017.

=== BX6 ===
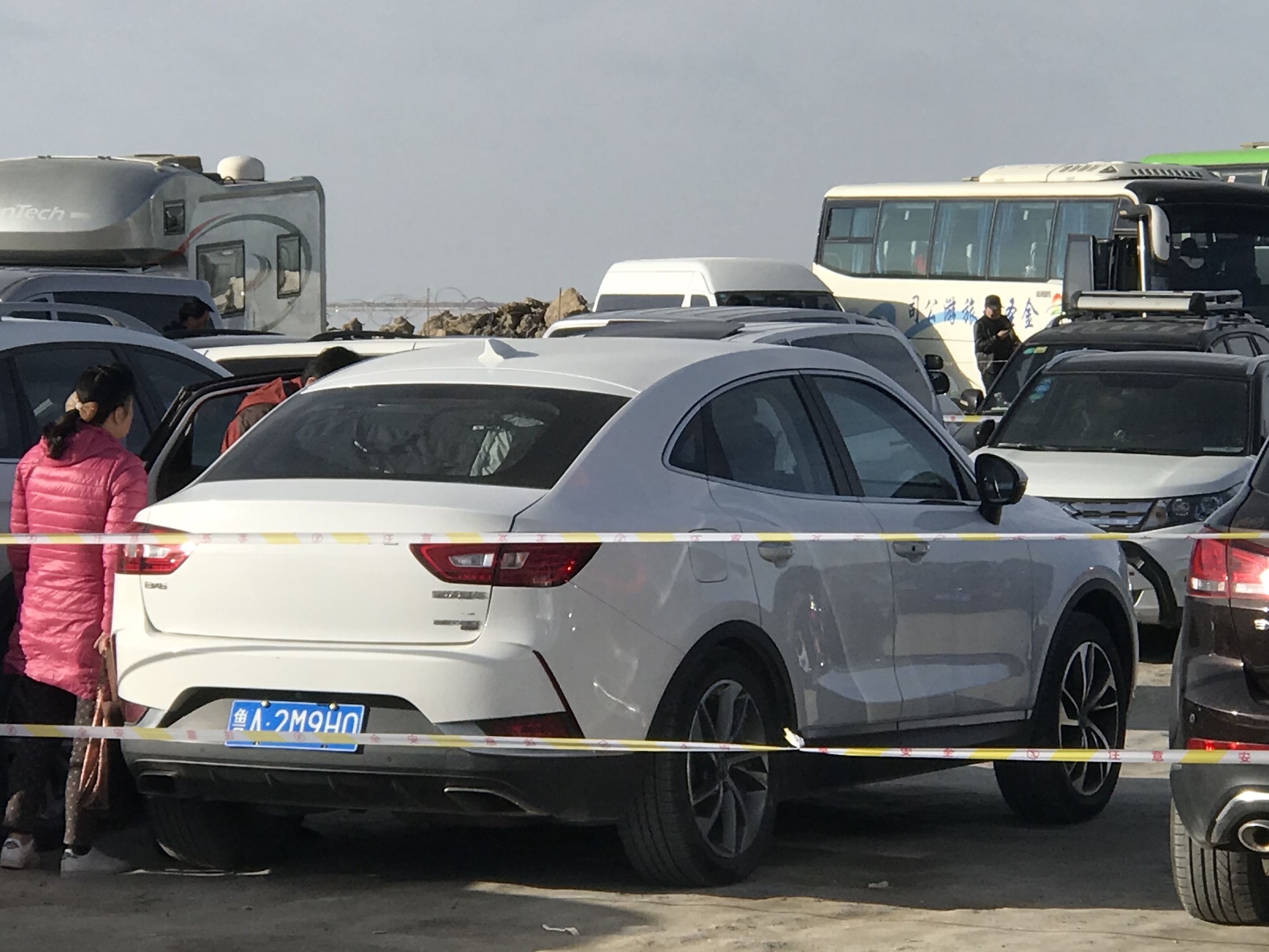
Borgward BX6 rear quarter

The coupé-styled BX6 derivative was first shown in 2016, but did not officially go on sale until May 2018. Period sources only refer to the most powerful engine, with the possibility of hybrid variants down the road. The BX6 saw very slow sales and production was halted sometime during 2019. 809 examples were sold in China in 2018, 398 examples in 2019. Exports and additional engine options were planned but appear not to have materialized.

== Powertrain ==
In China, the five-seater was driven to market launch by a 140 kW (190 PS; 188 bhp), turbocharged 1.8-litre petrol engine of Saab origins. As standard, the BX5 has a 6-speed automatic transmission and front-wheel drive, optional four-wheel drive is available. Later a 1.4-litre petrol engine with 110 kW (150 PS; 148 bhp) coupled with front-wheel drive, and the 2.0-litre petrol engine with 165 kW (224 PS; 221 bhp) and all-wheel drive from the larger BX7 were made available. In Germany, the BX5 is unlike initially thought to be sold exclusively with an electric motor.

=== Specifications ===
	20T GDI	25T GDI	28T GDI
Production	08/2017 – 08/2021	03/2017 – 08/2021	11/2017 – 08/2021
Engine displacement	1,395 cc (85.1 cu in)	1,797 cc (109.7 cu in)	1,981 cc (120.9 cu in)
Power output	110 kW (150 PS; 148 bhp) / 5,500 rpm	140 kW (190 PS; 188 bhp) / 5,500 rpm	165 kW (224 PS; 221 bhp) / 5,500 rpm
Maximum torque	250 N⋅m (184 lb⋅ft) / 1,750–4,000 rpm	280 N⋅m (207 lb⋅ft) / 1,750–4,500 rpm	300 N⋅m (221 lb⋅ft) / 1,500–4,500 rpm
Drive wheel	Front-wheel drive	Front-wheel drive, optional all-wheel drive	All-wheel drive
Transmission	6-speed manual or 6-speed automatic	6-speed automatic	
Top Speed	?	estimated at 190 km/h (118 mph)	?
Acceleration, 0–100 km/h (62 mph)	estimated at 13.2 s	estimated at 9.3 s	?.
Fuel consumption at 100 km/h (62 mph) (combined)	?	?	?
CO_{2}-Emission (combined)	?		
Fuel tank capacity	60 L (13 imp gal; 16 US gal)		

== Awards ==
Like the larger BX7, the BX5 and the BX6 TS (still a show car at the time) received the "German Design Award" for 2016.
