= Beijing BJ30 =

Compact crossover SUV

Beijing BJ20/BJ30
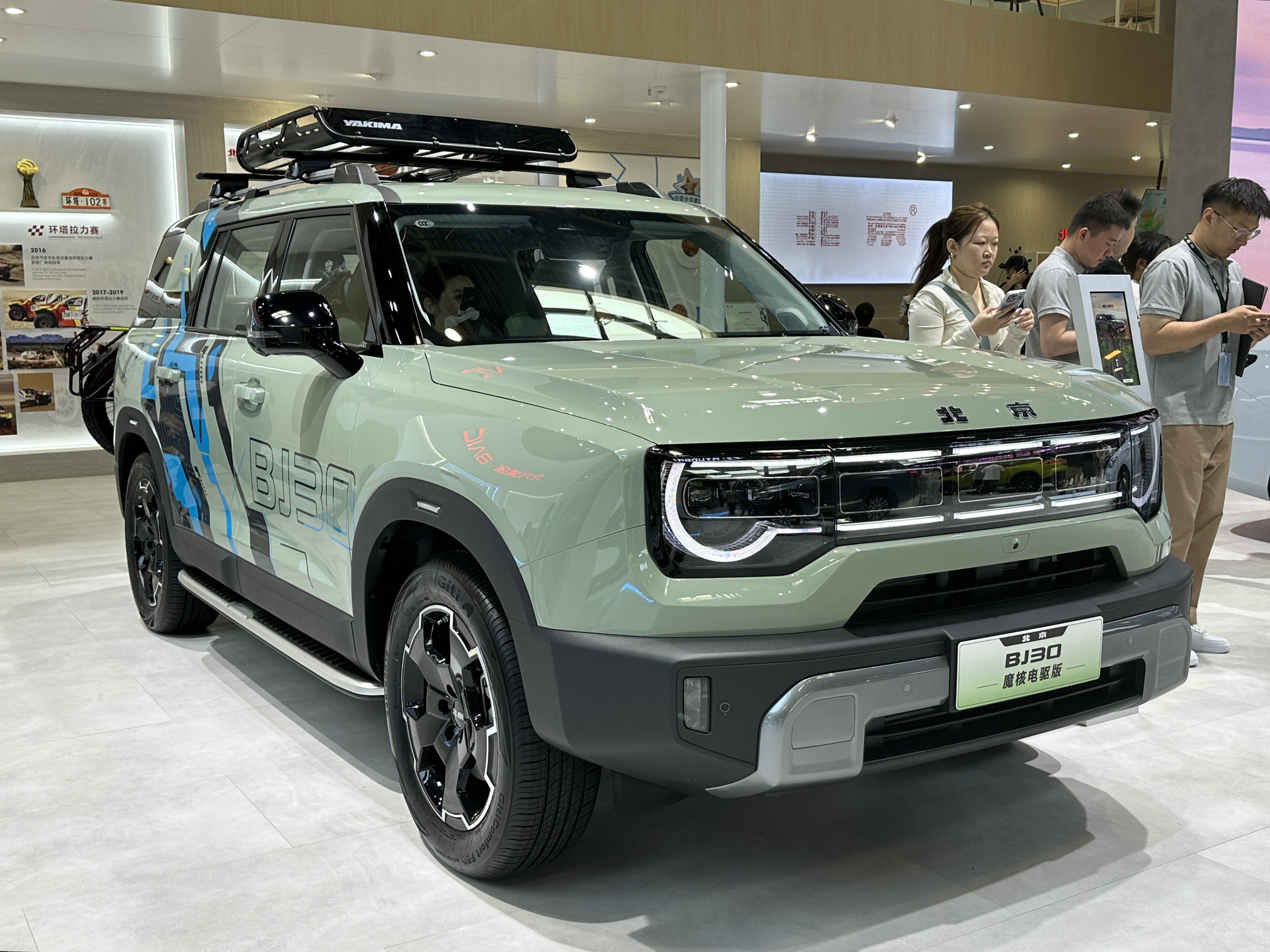
- Second generation Beijing BJ30 at 2024 Auto beijing

Overview
- Manufacturer: BAIC Motor
- Production: 2015–present

Body and chassis
- Class: Compact crossover SUV
- Body style: 5-door SUV

The Beijing BJ20/BJ30 is a compact crossover SUV produced by BAIC Motor since 2015. It was first introduced in 2015 as the BAIC BJ20, and later in 2020, it received a major facelift and was renamed to Beijing BJ30. The second generation model was introduced in 2024.

== BAIC BJ20 (2015-2020) ==
BAIC BJ20
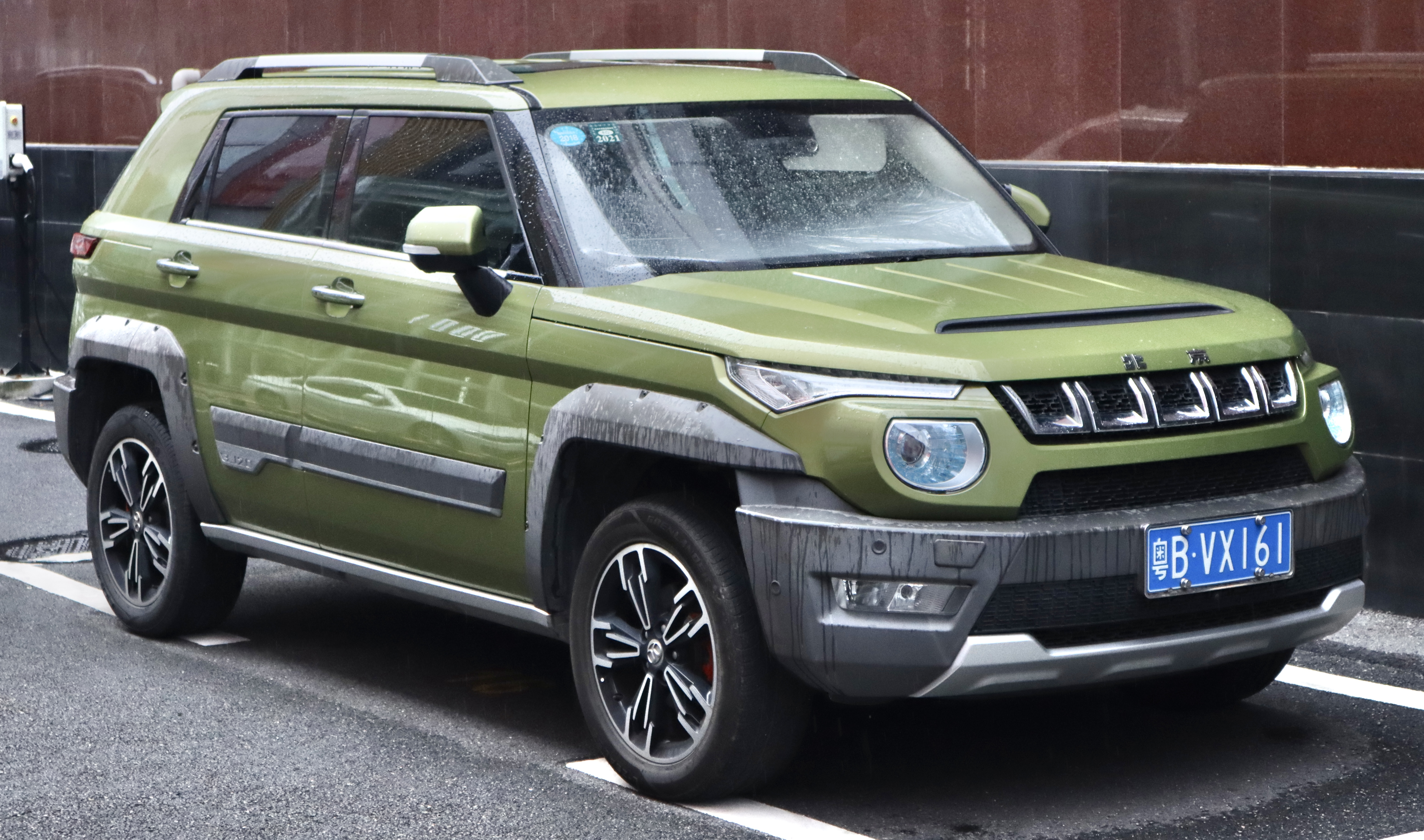

Overview
- Manufacturer: BAIC Motor
- Also called: Beijing BJ30 (facelift)
- Production: 2015–2020
- Assembly: Zhenjiang, China

Body and chassis
- Layout: Front engine, front-wheel drive
- Related: Senova X65; Changhe Q7

Powertrain
- Engine: 1.5 L 4A91 I4 (turbo petrol)
- Transmission: 6-speed manual; CVT

Dimensions
- Wheelbase: 2,670 mm (105 in)
- Length: 4,451 mm (175.2 in)
- Width: 1,845 mm (73 in)
- Height: 1,710 mm (67 in)
- Curb weight: 1,460 kg (3,220 lb)

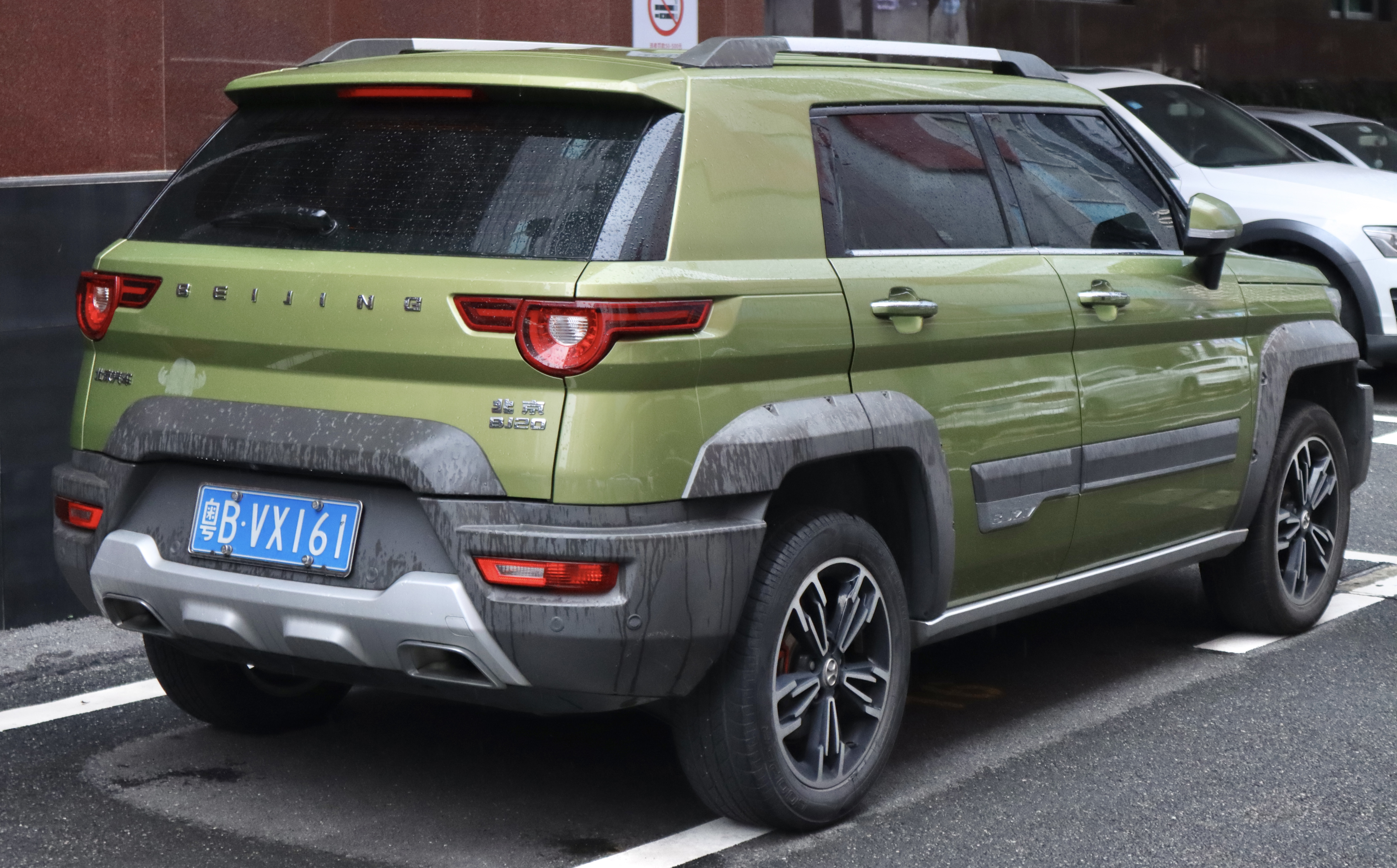
Rear view

First introduced as the BAIC BJ20 concept car at the 2015 Shanghai Auto Show, and previously the Beijing Auto Concept 500 that debuted on the Shanghai Auto Show in April 2013, the BAIC BJ20 production model was launched in August 2016, with the final production version of the Beijing Auto BJ20 debuting on the 2016 Chengdu Auto Show in China. The design of both the Concept 500 and the BJ20 were inspired by the Beijing BJ212, a classic Chinese off-road vehicle.

The BAIC BJ20 is based on the same platform as the Senova X65, and is powered by a Mitsubishi-sourced ‘4A91T’ 1.5 liter turbo engine producing 110 kW (147 hp) and 210 N⋅m (155 lb⋅ft). The only transmission offered is a six-speed manual gearbox and only front-wheel-drive is available.

== Beijing BJ30 (first generation, 2021) ==
Beijing BJ30
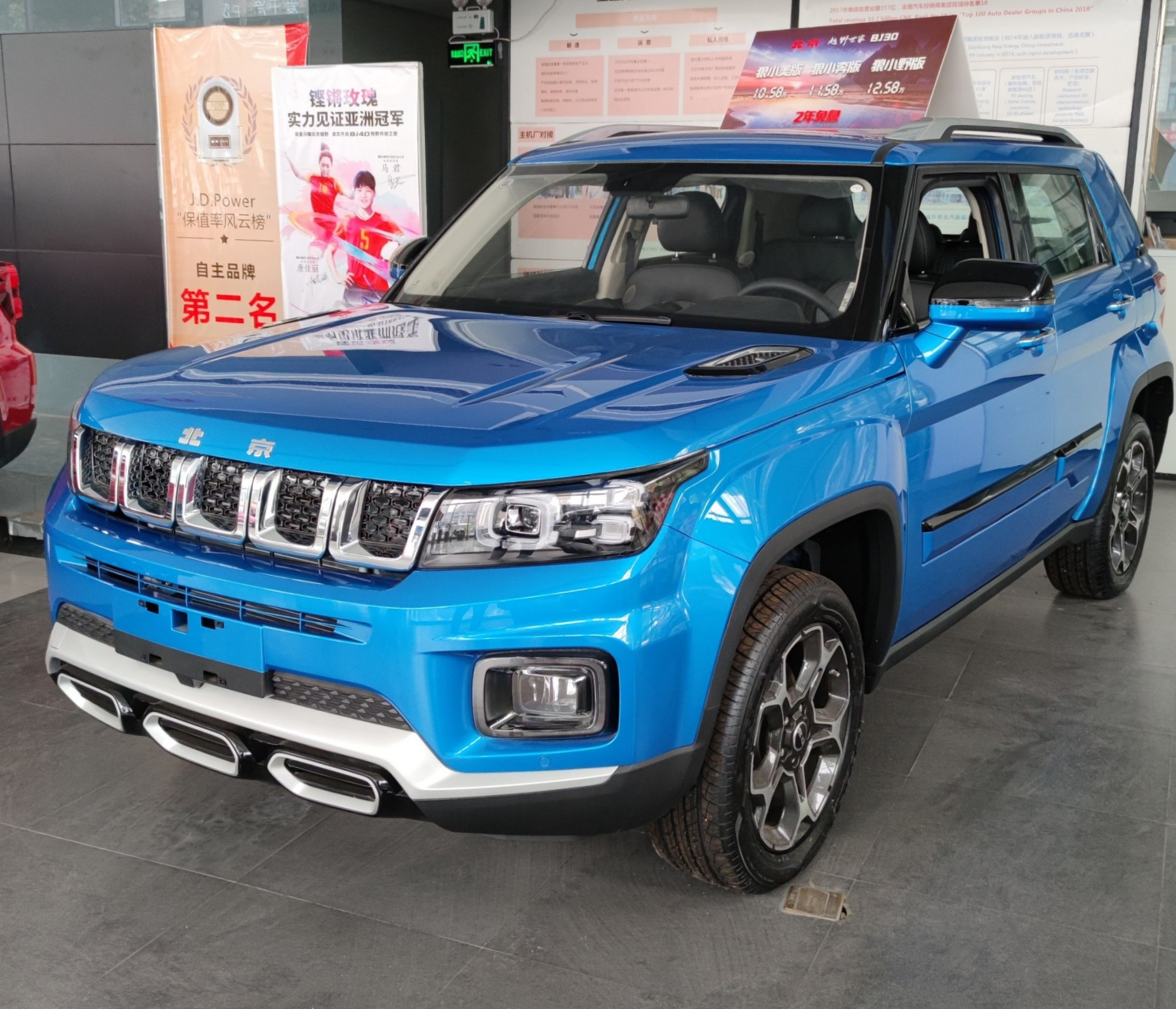

Overview
- Manufacturer: BAIC Motor
- Production: 2020–2023
- Assembly: Zhenjiang, China

Body and chassis
- Layout: Front engine, front-wheel drive
- Related: Senova X65; Changhe Q7

Powertrain
- Engine: 1.5 L 4A91 turbo I4; 1.5 L 4J15T turbo I4
- Transmission: 6-speed manual; CVT; 6-speed automatic

Dimensions
- Wheelbase: 2,675 mm (105 in)
- Length: 4,505 mm (177.4 in)
- Width: 1,855 mm (73 in)
- Height: 1,710 mm (67 in)
- Curb weight: 1,520 kg (3,350 lb)

Being essentially the facelift model of the BJ20, the BAIC BJ30 launched during the 2020 Guangzhou Auto Show in November 2020 is the first model to utilize Beijing Auto's updated product naming system, using 2, 4, 6, 8-sequenced numbers for rugged off-roaders, and employing 3, 5, 7 and 9 monikers for urban off-road models. Compared to the BJ20, the BJ30 features a completely redesigned front and rear while still equipped with the same powertrain which is a 1.5-liter turbocharged gasoline engine producing 112 kW (150 hp) and 210 N⋅m (155 lb⋅ft) of torque, mated to a 6-speed manual transmission or a CVT.

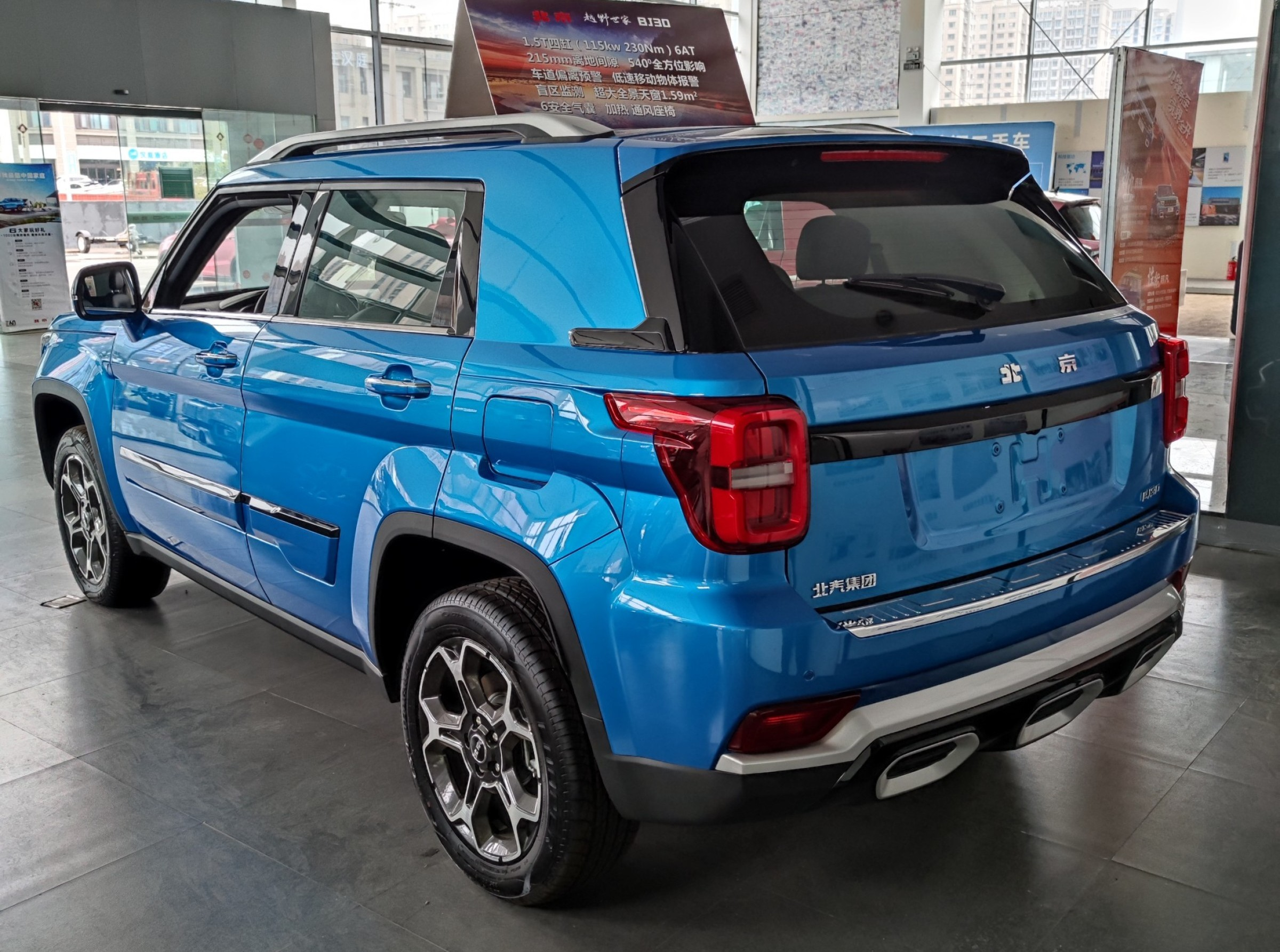
Beijing BJ30, rear

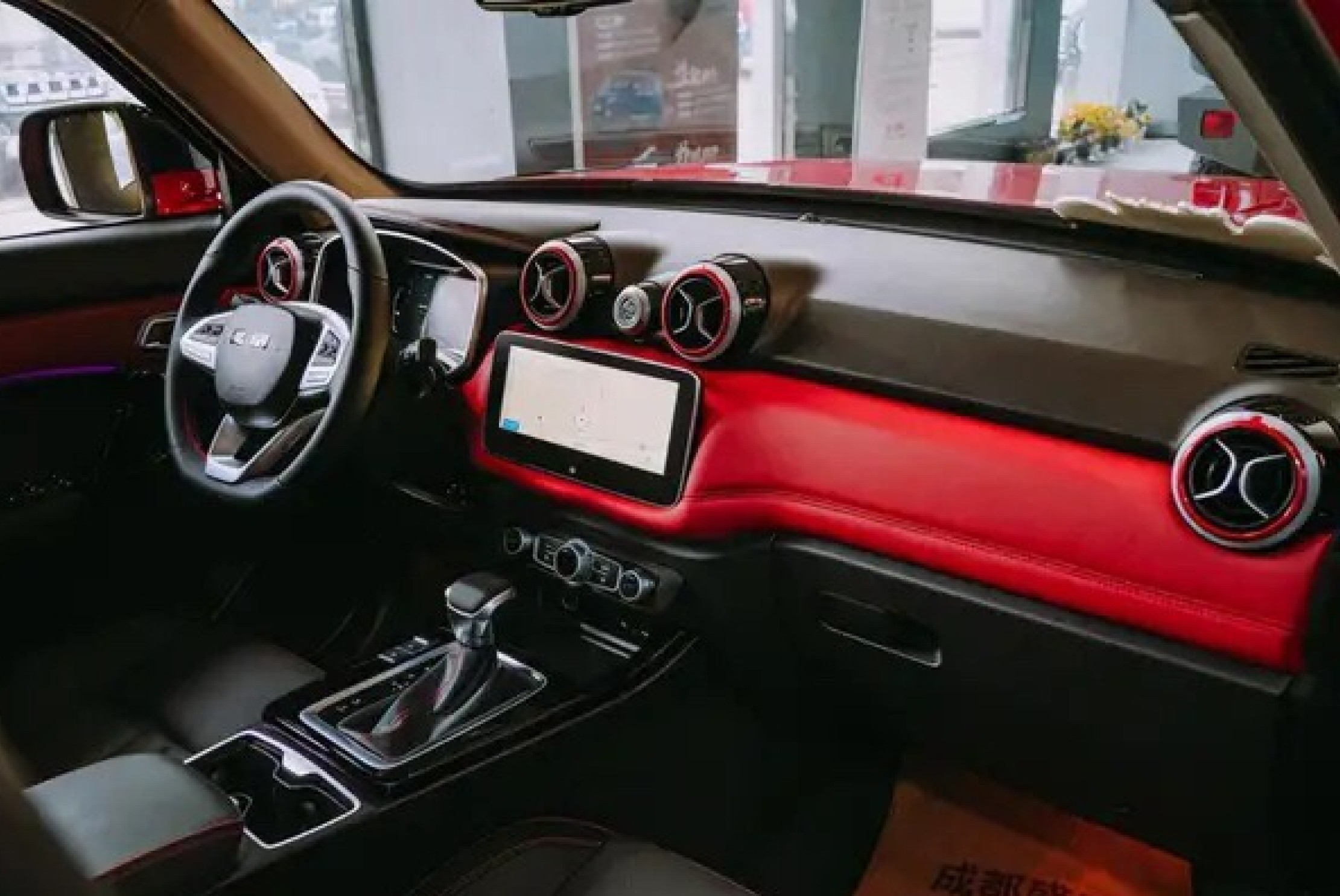
Beijing BJ30, interior

== Beijing BJ30 (second generation, 2024) ==
Beijing BJ30 II
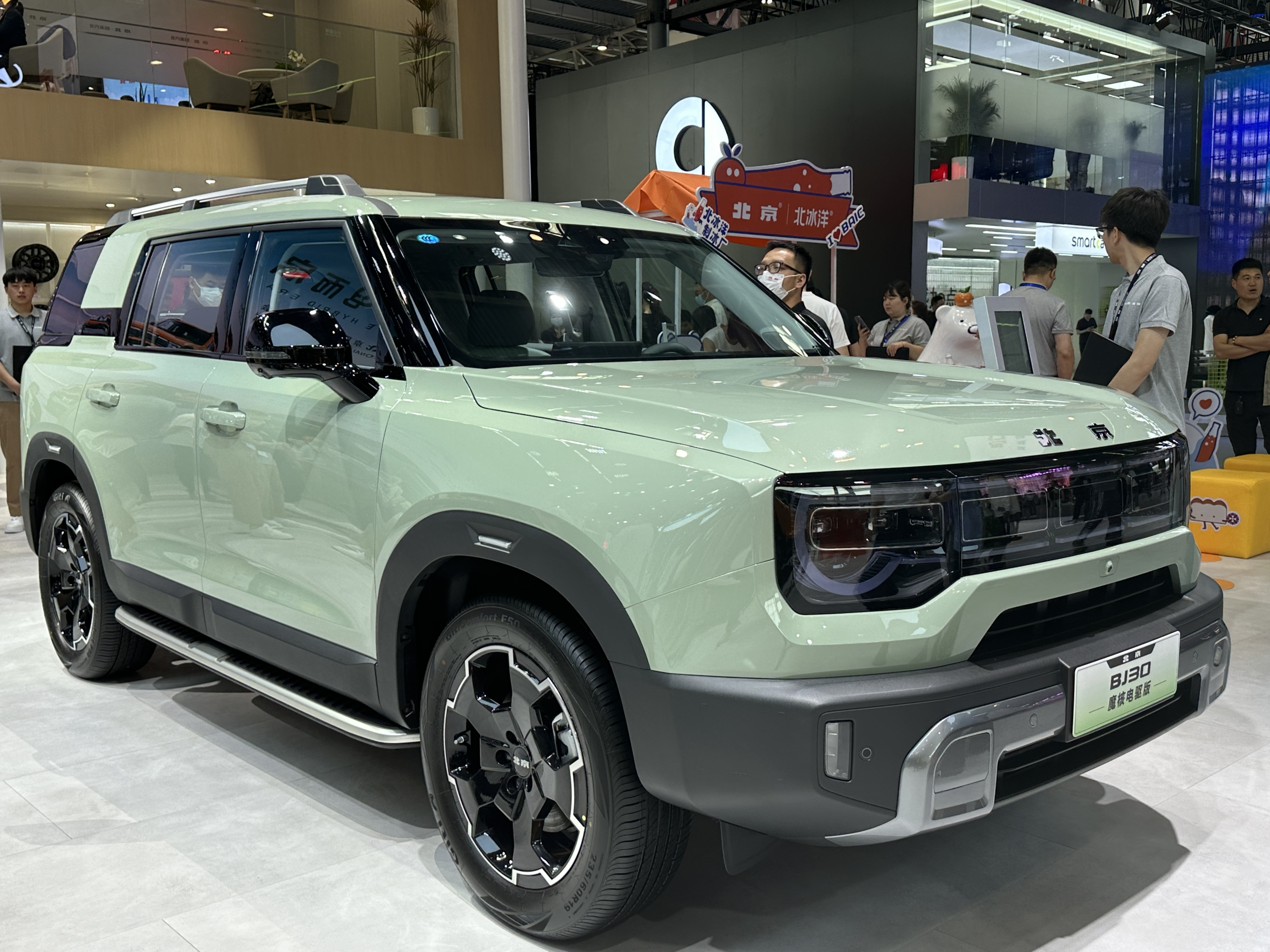

Overview
- Manufacturer: BAIC Motor
- Also called: BAIC BJ30 (Argentina); BAIC B30e Dune (Philippines); BAIC B30 (South Africa)
- Production: 2024–present
- Assembly: Zhenjiang, China; Gqeberha, South Africa; Purwakarta, Indonesia

Body and chassis
- Layout: Front engine, front-wheel drive; Front engine, four-wheel drive (BJ30e)

Powertrain
- Engine: Petrol: 1.5 L A156T2H turbo I4; Petrol hybrid: 1.5 L A156T2H-H1 turbo I4
- Transmission: 7-speed DCT; 1-speed DHT (BJ30e); 2-speed DHT (BJ30e)
- Hybrid drivetrain: Series-parallel hybrid
- Battery: 1.67 kWh NMC Sunwoda/SVOLT

Dimensions
- Wheelbase: 2,820 mm (111.0 in)
- Length: 4,730 mm (186.2 in)
- Width: 1,910 mm (75.2 in)
- Height: 1,757 mm (69.2 in)
- Curb weight: 1,575–1,790 kg (3,472–3,946 lb)

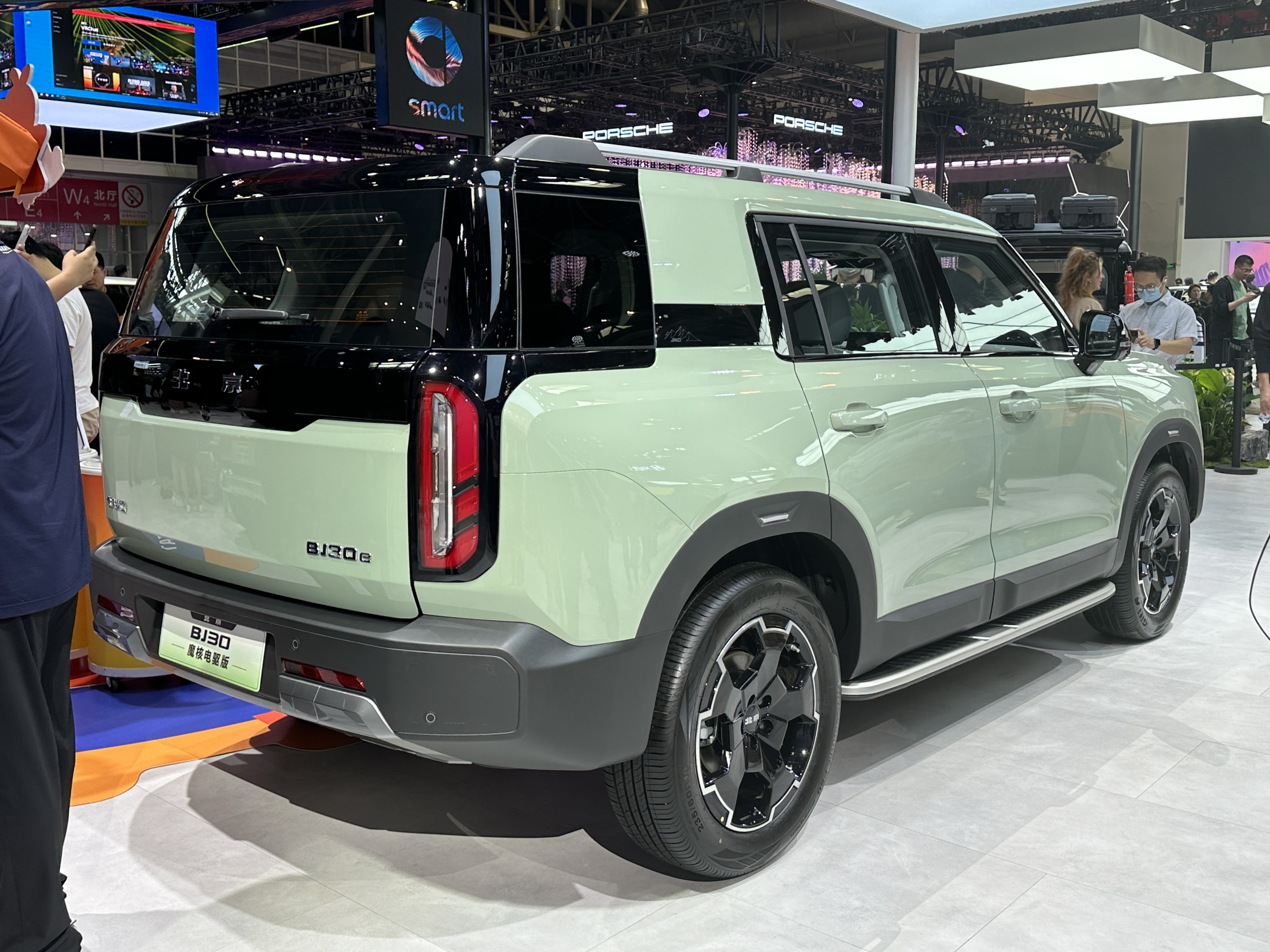
Beijing BJ30 II rear

The second generation Beijing BJ30 is powered by a 1.5-liter A156T2H turbo engine produced by Beijing Automotive Powertrain Co., Ltd., producing a maximum power of 138 kW (185 hp) paired to a 7-speed Dual-clutch transmission. A range extended electric version is also offered powered by the 1.5-liter A156T2H-H1 turbo engine produced by Beijing Automotive Powertrain Co., Ltd., specially tuned for hybrid operation and mated a 2-speed Dedicated Hybrid Transmission (DHT). Its styling is controversial as it looks like the Ford Bronco Sport.

Specifications
| Model | Engine | | | | Motor | | System total | | Transmission | Top speed | Kerb weight |
| Model | Type | Net power | Gross power | Torque | Front | Rear | Power | Torque | Transmission | Top speed | Kerb weight |
|---|---|---|---|---|---|---|---|---|---|---|---|
| Petrol FWD | 1.5 L A156T2H I4 turbo, 10.7:1 C.R. | 174 hp (130 kW; 176 PS) at 5,500 rpm | 185 hp (138 kW; 188 PS) | 305 N⋅m (225 lb⋅ft) at 1,500–4,250 rpm | | | 174 hp (130 kW; 176 PS) | 305 N⋅m (225 lb⋅ft) | 7-speed DCT | 190 km/h (118 mph) | 1,575–1,600 kg (3,472–3,527 lb) |
| Hybrid FWD | 1.5 L A156T2H-H1 I4 turbo, 13.25:1 C.R. | 151 hp (113 kW; 153 PS) at 5,000 rpm | 155 hp (116 kW; 157 PS) | 235 N⋅m (173 lb⋅ft) at 2,000–4,500 rpm | 130 kW TZ210XYH02 PMSM; 174 hp (130 kW; 176 PS), 315 N⋅m (232 lb⋅ft) | | 330 hp (246 kW; 335 PS) | 550 N⋅m (406 lb⋅ft) | 2-speed DHT | 170 km/h (106 mph) | 1,690 kg (3,726 lb) |
| Hybrid AWD | 1.5 L A156T2H-H1 I4 turbo, 13.25:1 C.R. | 151 hp (113 kW; 153 PS) at 5,000 rpm | 155 hp (116 kW; 157 PS) | 235 N⋅m (173 lb⋅ft) at 2,000–4,500 rpm | 130 kW TZ210XYH02 PMSM; 174 hp (130 kW; 176 PS), 315 N⋅m (232 lb⋅ft) | 55 kW TZ180XS268 PMSM; 74 hp (55 kW; 75 PS), 135 N⋅m (100 lb⋅ft) | 403 hp (301 kW; 409 PS) | 685 N⋅m (505 lb⋅ft) | 2-speed DHT | 170 km/h (106 mph) | 1,770 kg (3,902 lb) |
| 2027 Hybrid AWD | 1.5 L A156T2H-H1 I4 turbo, 13.25:1 C.R. | 151 hp (113 kW; 153 PS) at 5,000 rpm | 155 hp (116 kW; 157 PS) | 235 N⋅m (173 lb⋅ft) at 2,000–4,500 rpm | 130 kW TZ210XYH10 PMSM; 174 hp (130 kW; 176 PS), 450 N⋅m (332 lb⋅ft) | 70 kW YS180XS320 induction; 94 hp (70 kW; 95 PS), 135 N⋅m (100 lb⋅ft) | 403 hp (301 kW; 409 PS) | 685 N⋅m (505 lb⋅ft) | 1-speed DHT | 170 km/h (106 mph) | 1,790 kg (3,946 lb) |

=== Markets ===
==== Argentina ====
The BJ30 was launched in Argentina on 17 February 2025 and it is only available in two variants: Hybrid 4x4 and Hybrid 4x2, four-wheel drive and two-wheel drive respectively, both are powered by a 1.5-litre turbocharged petrol engine.

==== Brunei ====
The BJ30 was launched in Brunei on 30 January 2026 and it is only available in the two variants: Chassis and Grand, the two latter were only in two-wheel drive which is powered by a 1.5-litre turbocharged petrol engine. The BJ30e with 1.5-litre turbocharged petrol hybrid powertrain was also launched on 14 March 2026 and it is offered in Grand 2WD and Grand 4WD variants.

==== Indonesia ====
The BJ30 was launched in Indonesia on 23 July 2025 at the 32nd Gaikindo Indonesia International Auto Show, and the first country for the global introduction of the right-hand drive (RHD) model. Initially imported from China, it is available in 4x2 (single electric motor) and 4x4 (dual electric motor) variants.

==== Philippines ====
The BJ30e was released in the Philippines on 19 September 2024 as the BAIC B30e Dune. Initially imported from China, it was available in 4x2 (single electric motor) and 4x4 (dual electric motor) variants, powered by the 1.5-litre turbocharged petrol hybrid.

==== South Africa ====
The BJ30e was launched in South Africa on 11 November 2025 as the BAIC B30. Locally assembled in South Africa, it is available in two trim levels: Elite and Premium. For powertrains, the Elite and Premium trims is powered by either a 1.5-litre turbocharged petrol or a 1.5-litre turbocharged petrol hybrid.

== Sales ==
| Year | China |
|---|---|
| 2023 | 237 |
| 2024 | 27,719 |
| 2025 | 48,889 |
