= 7Q =

7Q or 7q may refer to:

- 7Q, IATA code for Air Libya
- KG-7Q outboard motor; see Mercury KG-7Q Super 10 Hurricane
- 7Q, designation for one of the Qumran Caves
  - 7Q5, a small papyrus fragment discovered in Qumran Cave 7
- 7q, an arm of Chromosome 7 (human)
- 7Q, the production code for the 1989 Doctor Who serial Ghost Light

== See also ==
- Q7 (disambiguation)
