= Huansu S6 =

Chinese compact SUV

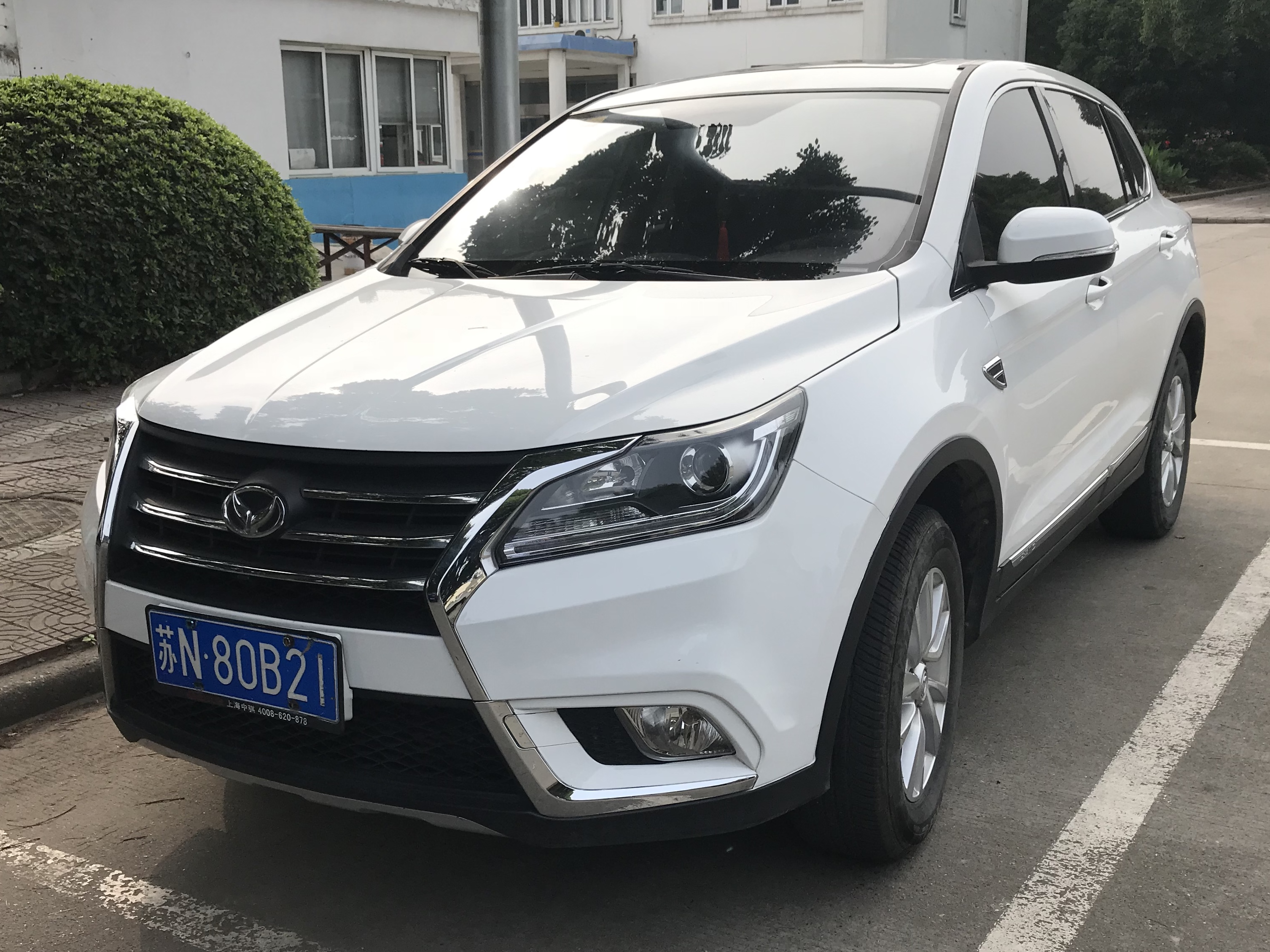

Overview
- Manufacturer: Huansu-BAIC Group
- Also called: Kenbo 600 (South Korea)
- Production: 2015–2020
- Model years: 2015–2020

Body and chassis
- Class: Compact CUV
- Body style: 5-door station wagon
- Layout: FF
- Related: Senova X65

Powertrain
- Engine: 1.5L I4 turbo 2.0L I4 turbo
- Transmission: 6-speed manual

Dimensions
- Wheelbase: 2,700 mm (106.3 in)
- Length: 4,693 mm (184.8 in)
- Width: 1,839 mm (72.4 in)
- Height: 1,683 mm (66.3 in)
- Curb weight: 1,594–1,619 kg (3,514–3,569 lb)

The Huansu S6 is a 5-seat Compact SUV produced by Huansu, a sub-brand of BAIC Motor and Yinxiang Group.

== Overview ==
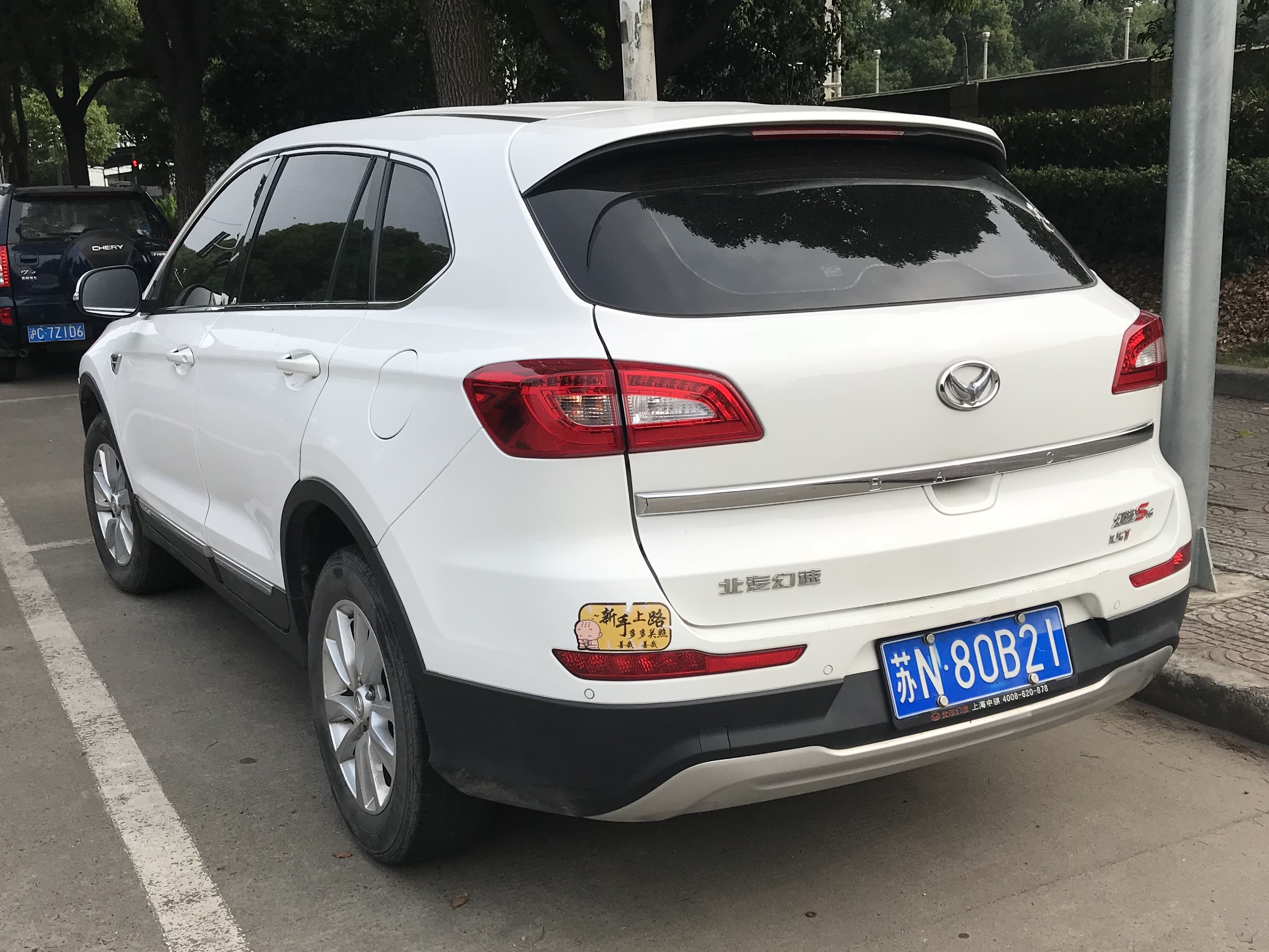
Huansu S6 rear

The Huansu S6 is manufactured by Beiqi Yinxiang Automobile. Based on the same platform as the Senova X65, the Huansu S6 was officially launched in September 2015, with prices ranging from 88,800 yuan to 116,800 yuan.
