= Borgward Group =

German-based automobile brand

Borgward Group AG
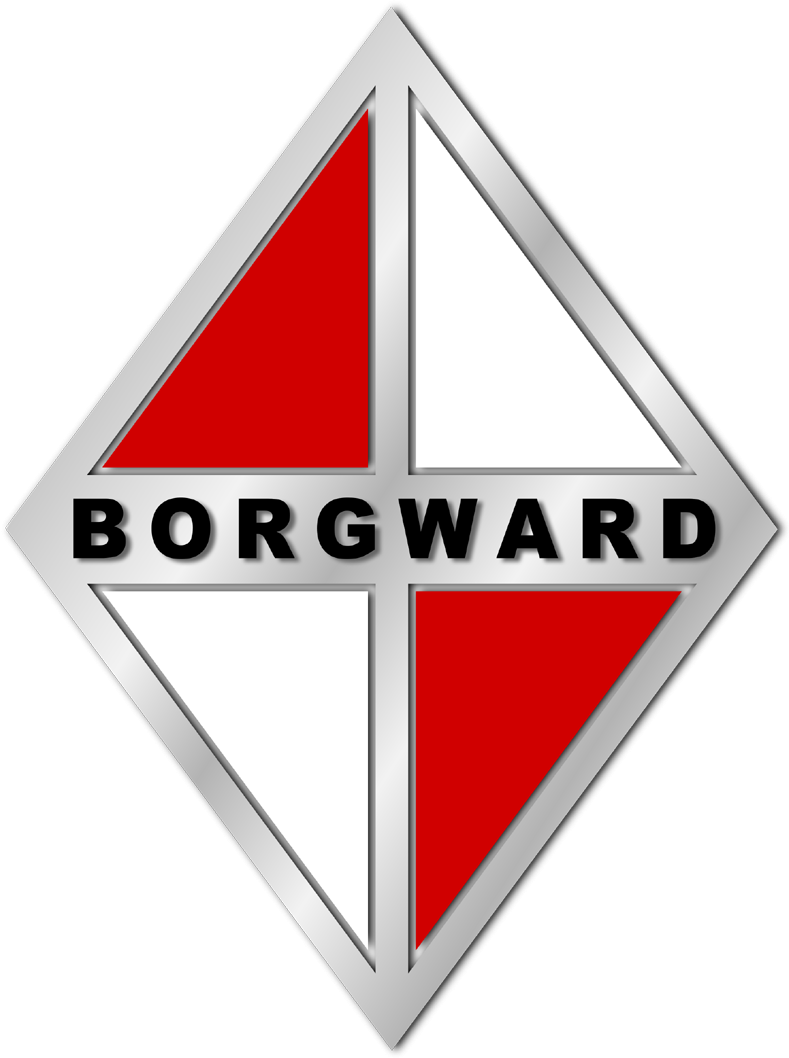
- Type: Private
- Industry: Automotive
- Founded: 2010
- Defunct: 2022
- Fate: bankruptcy
- Headquarters: former Stuttgart, Germany Headquarters and China Production
- Area served: Germany; Mainland China; Malaysia; Nepal
- Key people: Christian Borgward (Chairman), Xiuzhan Zhu (CEO),
- Products: Automobiles
- Total equity: Christian Borgward; Karlheinz L. Knöss; 23 % Foton Motor Insolvent; 67 % UCAR Group
- Website: www.borgward.com

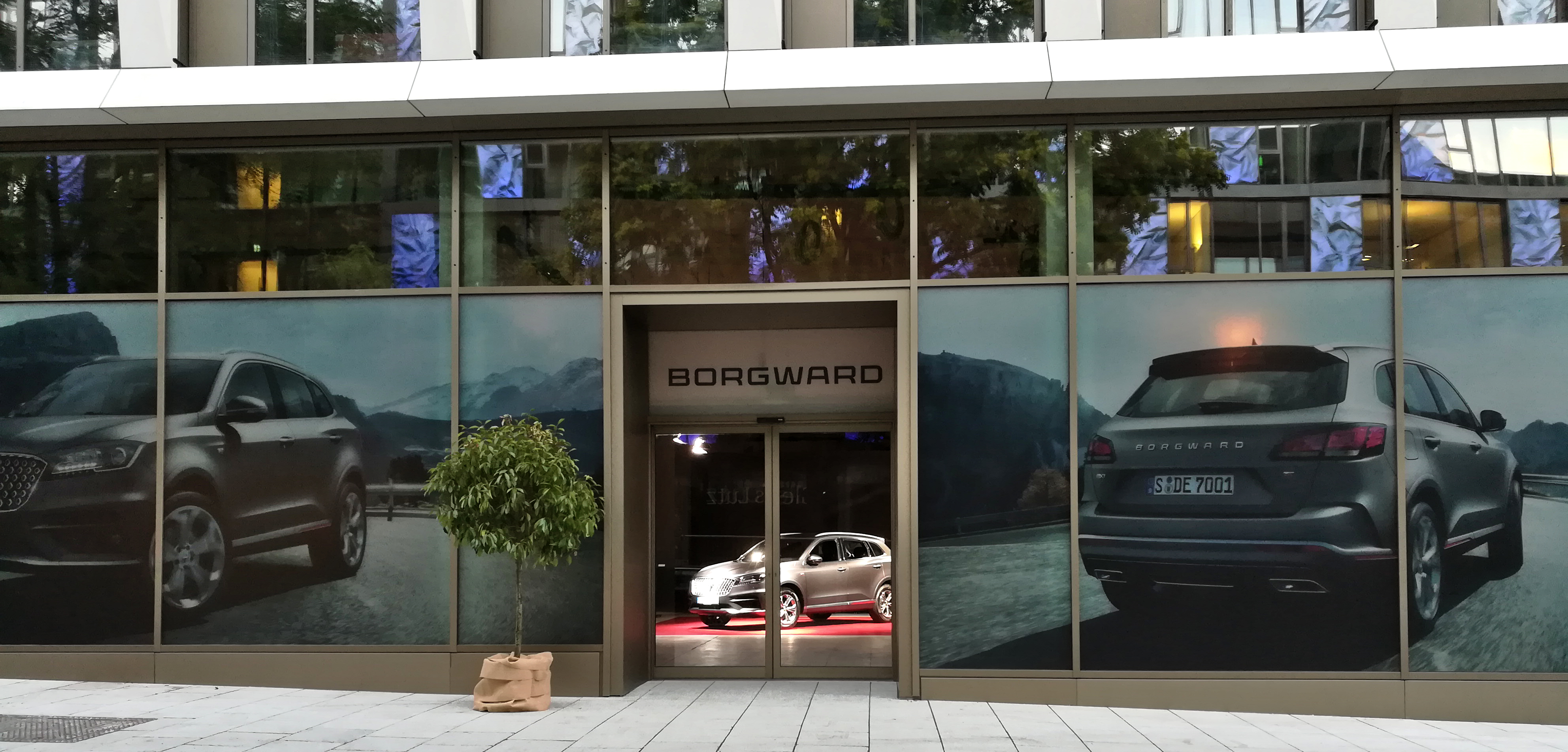
The first Borgward-Flagship-Store in Europe opened in June 2018 in Stuttgart

Borgward Group AG was a Chinese-German automobile brand established in 2010 with headquarters in Stuttgart, Germany. The company carried the name and logo of the former German brand Borgward. Design and engineering was located in Germany, but the cars were produced in China by Foton Motor.

Borgward started its business with a range of conventional SUVs, with sales reaching approx. 75,000 units by January 2018. The firm had branches in China, Russia, India, Brazil and Mexico. Borgward presented the Isabella concept at the Frankfurt Motor Show 2017, its vision of a full-electric 4-door coupé.

Foton sold their interest to Ucar in 2019 but following poor sales in 2020 and 2021, the company filed bankruptcy in China in April 2022 and was declared bankrupt in December 2022.

== History ==
Christian Borgward revived the Borgward trademark with the help of the Chinese truck manufacturer Foton, who sold a stake in the company to the Chinese car rental group Ucar in 2019. Borgward Group AG is responsible for the development, production, sales and marketing of Borgward cars.

=== Genesis ===
In April 2005, Christian Borgward (grandson of Carl F. W. Borgward) as president and Karlheinz L. Knöss as CEO and vice president of the supervisory board started the revival of Borgward. They started the development of the new Borgward automobiles with car designers Roland Sternmann and Benjamin Nawka, set up the organisation and engineer team and developed several car concepts. On 21 May 2008, Borgward and Knöss founded Borgward Group AG in Lucerne, Switzerland, later relocating to Stuttgart, Germany.

Foton obtained the rights to maintain the Borgward name in 2014. In 2016, the company announced plans to build a 10,000-car per year factory in Bremen, Borgward's original hometown, but these plans had been largely abandoned by 2018.

Borgward announced plans for a new car at the 2015 Geneva Motor Show after a 54-year hiatus. The new company was backed up financially by Chinese truck manufacturer Foton.

=== Troubles ===
In 2018, amidst falling sales, Foton Motors announced plans to sell two thirds of their stake in Borgward to raise capital.

According to the German newspaper Automobilwoche, the company struggled to earn better sales after Foton sold its 67% stake to UCar in 2019 for $614 million. The newspaper said that Borgward sold around 5,000 vehicles in the first half of 2020. According to André Lacerda, a Borgward salesman at Borgward's sole European retail location in Luxembourg, the company did not have plans to halt reintroduction of Borgward vehicles throughout Europe.

Charles Zhengyao Lu, chairman of Luckin Coffee, was also involved in an accounting scandal, which played a role in the sudden sales decline.

Borgward had reportedly vacated its headquarters in Stuttgart as of 2020, with calls to the office going unanswered. By 2021, most vehicle production had ceased. Borgward's Malaysian operations were discontinued due to lack of shipment of vehicles from China and mediocre sales. Ucar denied news that the company had gone bankrupt, but acknowledged difficulties in finding investors while it entered administration in June 2021. However, a Beijing court ordered its assets seized for failing to pay debts in December 2021.

Borgward filed for bankruptcy in Beijing on 8 April 2022. On 5 December 2022, the First Intermediate People’s Court of Beijing approved the company's bankruptcy declaration.

Jochen Sibert from JSC Automotive criticized the company's plan to use small stores instead of large dealerships to market the vehicles in 2020.

=== Leadership ===
- Karlheinz L. Knöss (2009–2015)
- Ulrich Walker (2015–2018)
- Philip Koehn (2018)
- Xiuzhan Zhu (2018–2022)

== Overseas presence ==
At the 14th International Motor Show in Dubai on 14 November 2017, the Borgward BX5 and BX7 were introduced to GCC countries.

The brand was distributed in Malaysia by Go Bremen Motors. An agreement signed between GBM and Borgward would have brought manufacturing of vehicles and exports to some parts of ASEAN. However, plans to launch the brand in Malaysia in 2019 were stalled. In the end, Go Auto did distribute Borgwards in Malaysia in a sporadic manner, with sales ending in 2021.

On 7 July 2018, the Luxembourgish company Autodis Esch/Mersch was appointed as the first European retailer/distributor for Borgward. The European market received the larger BX7 beginning in 2018, followed by the smaller BX5. Borgward obtained Russian type approval for the BX7 in 2018 but never established any local distribution.

In April 2020, it was announced that DSM Global Company is in partnership with GBM to handle car exports to Nepal with the former handling Nepali operations.

Borgward had plans to retail its vehicles to Britain and Ireland in 2019 with models distributed by International Motors, but that did not proceed.

== Models ==
The Borgward BX7 SUV was introduced at the IAA, Frankfurt in September 2015. Sales in China started in July 2016.

=== SUVs ===
- Borgward BX3
- Borgward BX5
- Borgward BX6
- Borgward BX7
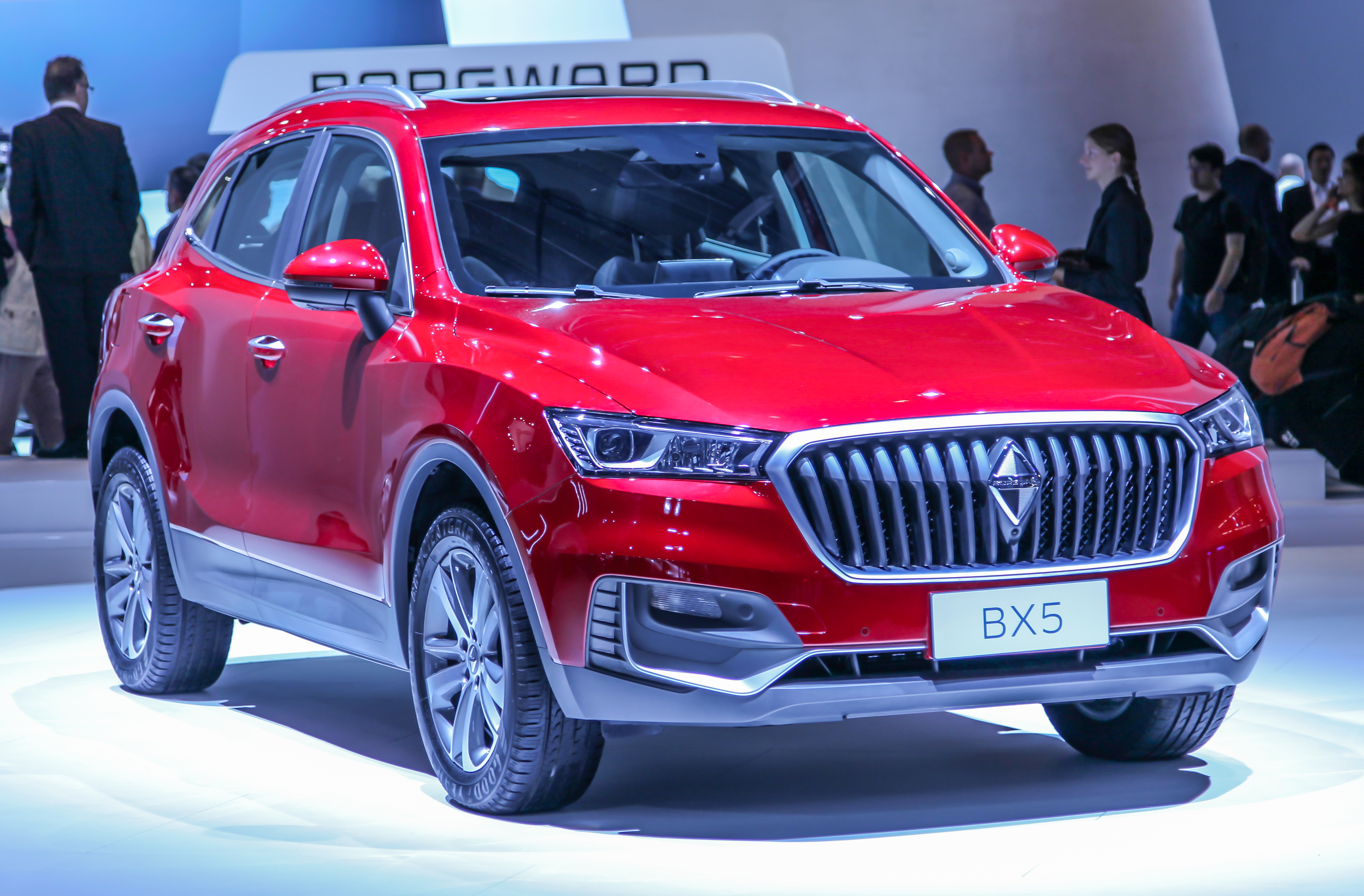
Borgward BX5

Borgward BX6

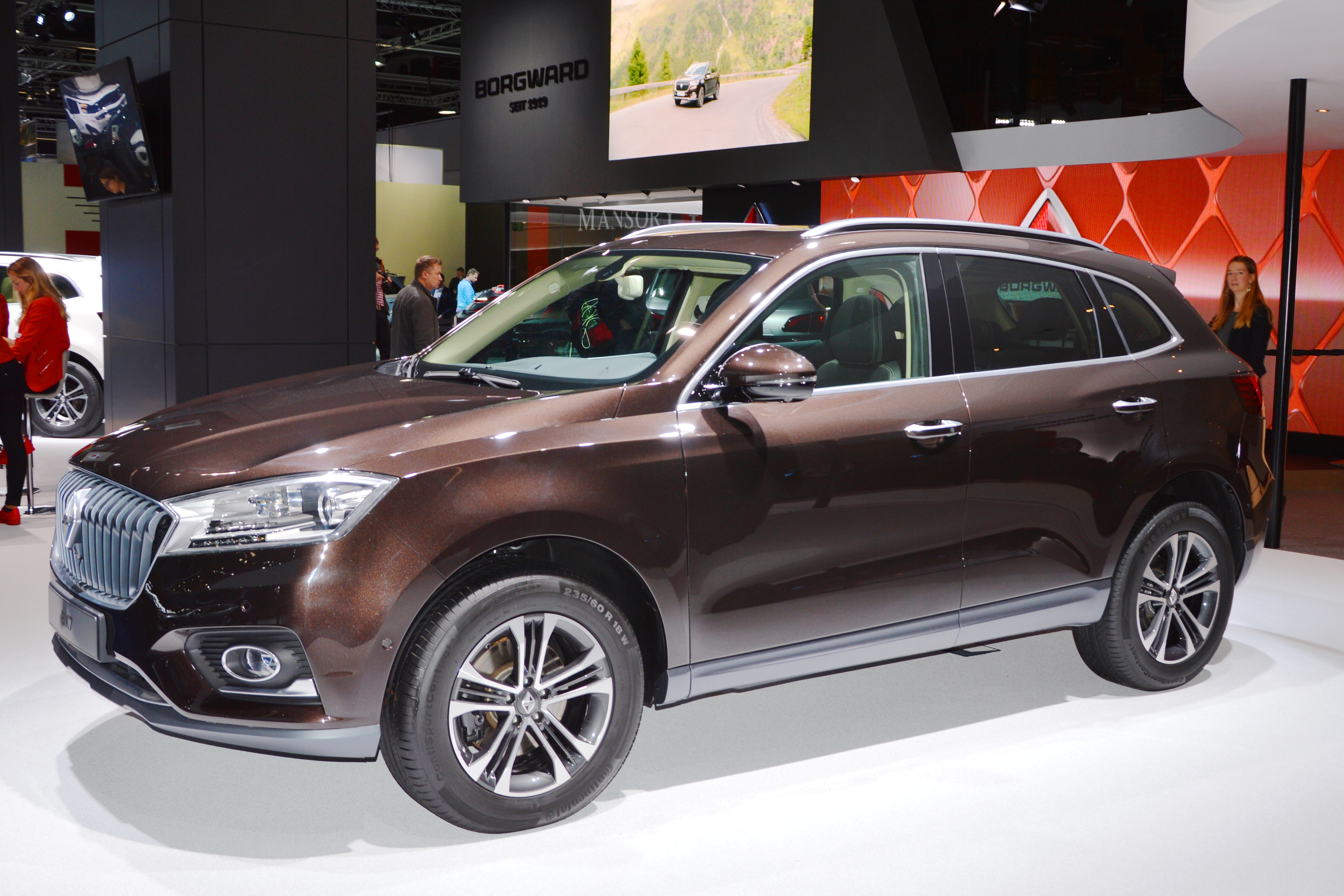
Borgward BX7 at IAA 2015

=== Concept cars ===
- Borgward Isabella Concept (2017)
- Borgward BXi7 (Electric Vehicle, SUV)
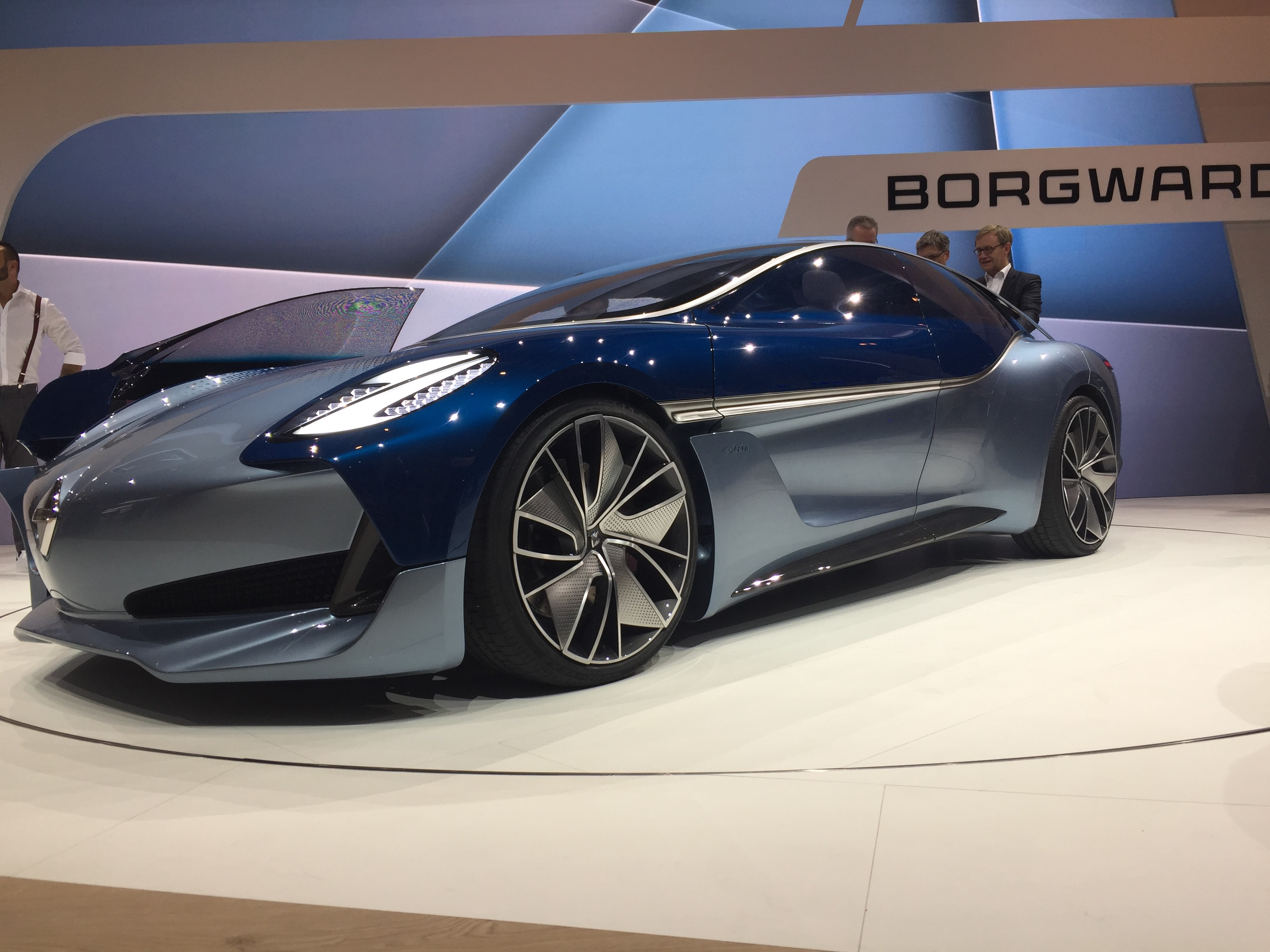
Front-side view of the Borgward Isabella concept 4-door full-electric coupé

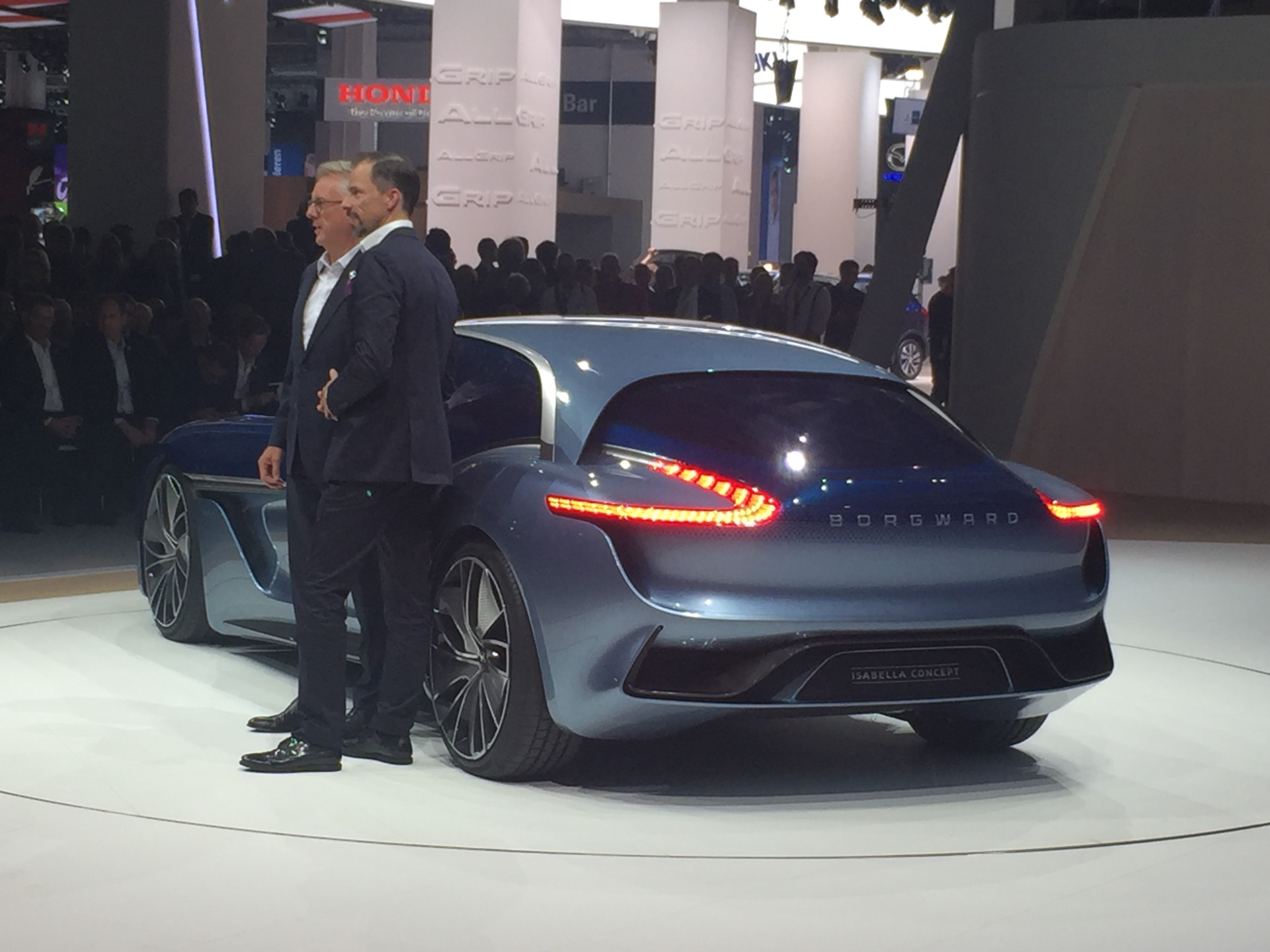
Borgward CEO Ulrich Walker (left) and Chief Designer Anders Warming (right) present the Isabella concept at the 2017 Frankfurt Motor Show 2017

== Sales ==
According to the China Association of Automobile Manufacturers (CAAMP), Borgward reportedly sold around 30,000 BX7s in 2017. Sales slowed down in 2018, but Borgward sales in China in 2019 reached a record 45,321 units for the brand (data from CarSalesBase) – however, this is explained by the fact that the Ucar Group purchased Borgwards to upgrade its own parks. In 2020, at the height of the COVID-19 pandemic, the demand for Borgwards in China fell to 8703 units, in 2021 to 3530 units.
