= Borgward BX3 =

Overview
- Manufacturer: Borgward Group
- Production: 2019–2020
- Assembly: China: Miyun, Beijing

Body and chassis
- Class: Subcompact crossover SUV (C)
- Body style: 5-door SUV
- Layout: Front engine, front-wheel-drive

Powertrain
- Engine: 1.4 L BWE414A turbo I4
- Transmission: 6-speed automatic

Dimensions
- Wheelbase: 2,560 mm (100.8 in)
- Length: 4,410 mm (173.6 in)
- Width: 1,830 mm (72.0 in)
- Height: 1,670 mm (65.7 in)
- Curb weight: 1,431–1,480 kg (3,155–3,263 lb)

The Borgward BX3 is a Sino-German subcompact crossover SUV from the Borgward Group and produced by them in China between 2019 and 2020, possibly into 2021. It was a smaller version of the BX5 and used the smallest engine available in that car. Only a small number was built before production of all Borgwards ended when the company entered receivership in 2021; the company went bankrupt the following year.

== Overview ==
The world premiere of the Borgward BX3 took place in late December 2019, with sales starting in early 2020. The initial launch date was May 2018 but it was repeatedly pushed forward by the cash-strapped company. Erstwhile owner Beiqi Foton sold two thirds of the company to car-sharing company Ucar in early 2018. Being a cut down version of the larger BX5, the BX3 was quite expensive for its class. The high price coupled with the company's uncertain future limited sales in the Chinese home market: 195 cars in 2020 and 2 additional cars in 2021. The car was also exported to some tertiary markets such as Malaysia.

== Powertrain ==
The launch model was powered by a 110 kW (150 PS; 148 bhp), turbocharged 1.4-litre direct injection petrol engine derived from the Volkswagen EA211 engine, coupled with front-wheel drive. Four-wheel drive was not available. The engine was shared with its larger BX5 sibling. A six-speed automatic transmission, made by Aisin, was standard fitment. A six-speed manual was listed at the time of introduction but was never listed or given a price.
