= Changhe Q7 =

Chinese CUV

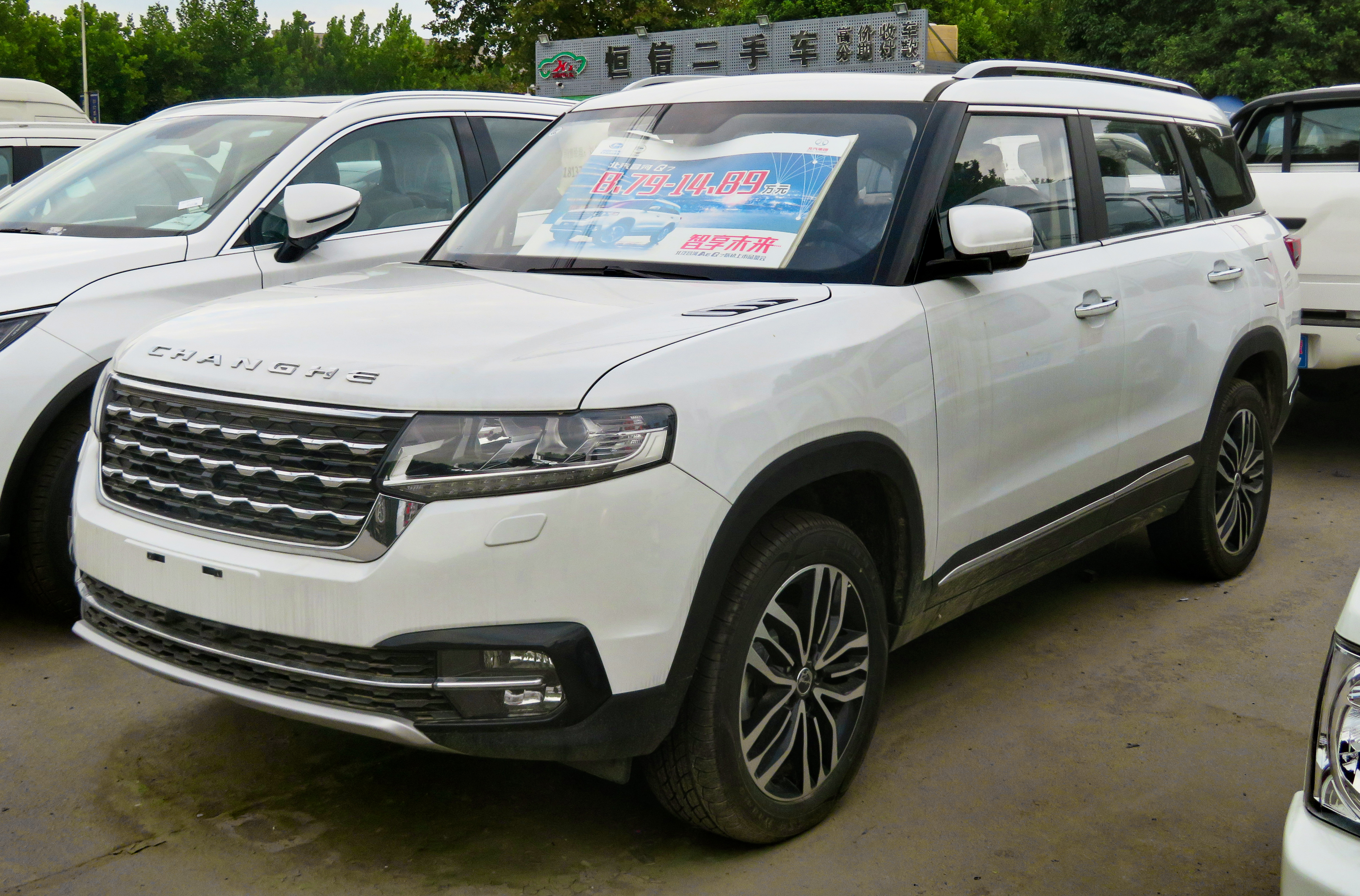

Overview
- Manufacturer: Changhe
- Production: 2017–2020
- Model years: 2018–2020

Body and chassis
- Class: Mid-size SUV
- Body style: 5-door crossover SUV
- Layout: FF
- Related: BAIC BJ20

Powertrain
- Engine: 1.5 L I4 (turbo petrol)
- Transmission: 6-speed manual; CVT

Dimensions
- Wheelbase: 2,670 mm (105.1 in)
- Length: 4,655 mm (183.3 in)
- Width: 1,855 mm (73.0 in)
- Height: 1,720 mm (67.7 in)
- Curb weight: 1,250–1,270 kg (2,756–2,800 lb)

The Changhe Q7 is a mid-size crossover produced by Changhe, unveiled during the 2017 Guangzhou Auto Show in China. and launched in the Chinese market in March 2018.

== Overview ==
Power of it comes from a 1.5-liter inline-four petrol turbo engine producing 110 kW and 200Nm of torque.

The pricing of it starts at 87,900 yuan and ends at 148,900 yuan.

The styling of it is controversial as it heavily resembles a Range Rover.

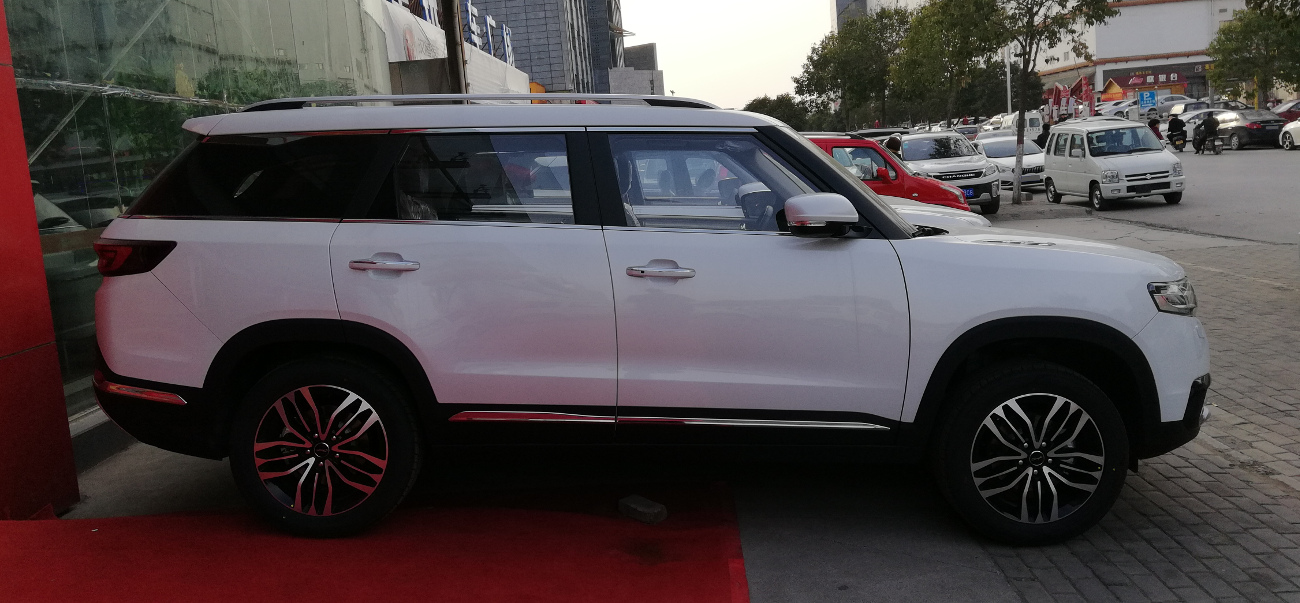
Changhe Q7 side view

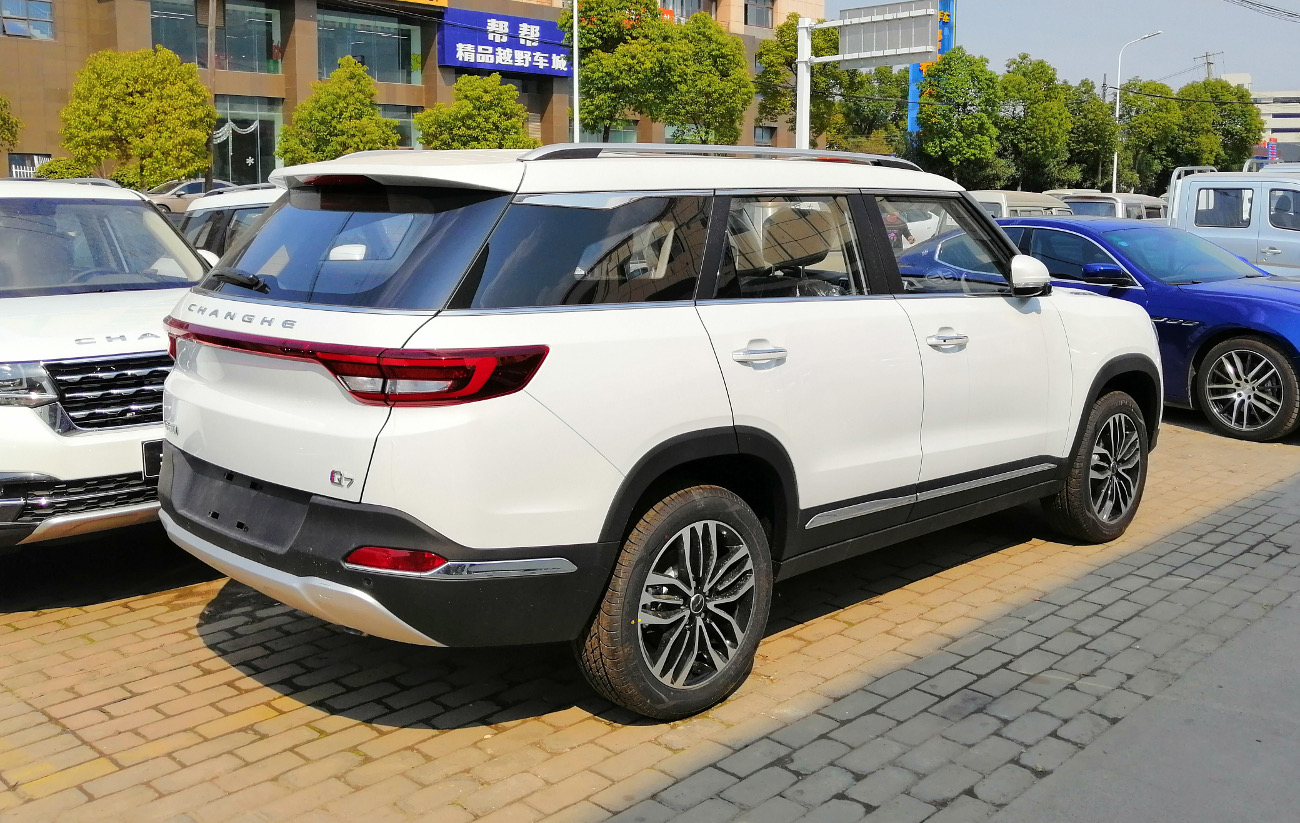
Changhe Q7 rear view
