= Borgward BX7 =

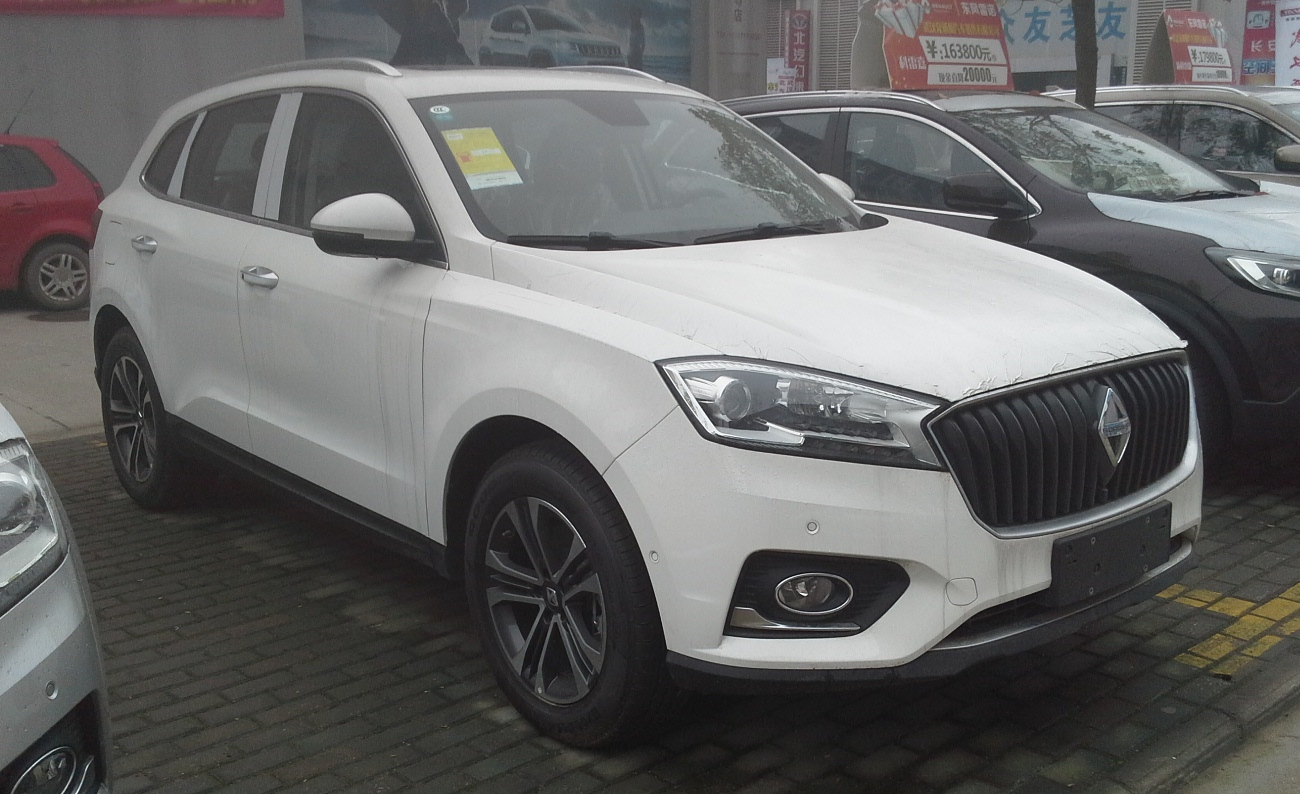

Overview
- Manufacturer: Borgward Group
- Production: 2016–2021
- Model years: 2017–2021
- Assembly: China: Beijing
- Designer: Roland Sternmann, Benjamin Nawka

Body and chassis
- Class: Compact luxury crossover SUV (D)
- Body style: 5-door SUV
- Layout: Front-engine, four-wheel-drive
- Related: Senova X65

Powertrain
- Engine: Petrol: 2.0 L BWE420B I4 turbo; Petrol PHEV: 2.0 L I4 turbo + electric motor
- Electric motor: 1×1XM AC permanent magnet synchronous (PHEV)
- Power output: 168 kW (225 hp; 228 PS) (petrol engine); 131 kW (176 hp; 178 PS) (electric motor, PHEV); 299 kW (401 hp; 407 PS) (combined, PHEV)
- Transmission: 6-speed automatic
- Hybrid drivetrain: Plug-in hybrid
- Battery: Li-ion battery: 13.2 kWh (PHEV)
- Electric range: 55 km (34 mi) (PHEV)

Dimensions
- Wheelbase: 2,760 mm (108.7 in)
- Length: 4,713 mm (185.6 in)
- Width: 1,911 mm (75.2 in)
- Height: 1,694 mm (66.7 in)

The Borgward BX7 is a Sino-German compact luxury crossover SUV from the Borgward Group and produced in China by Foton Motor.

== Overview ==
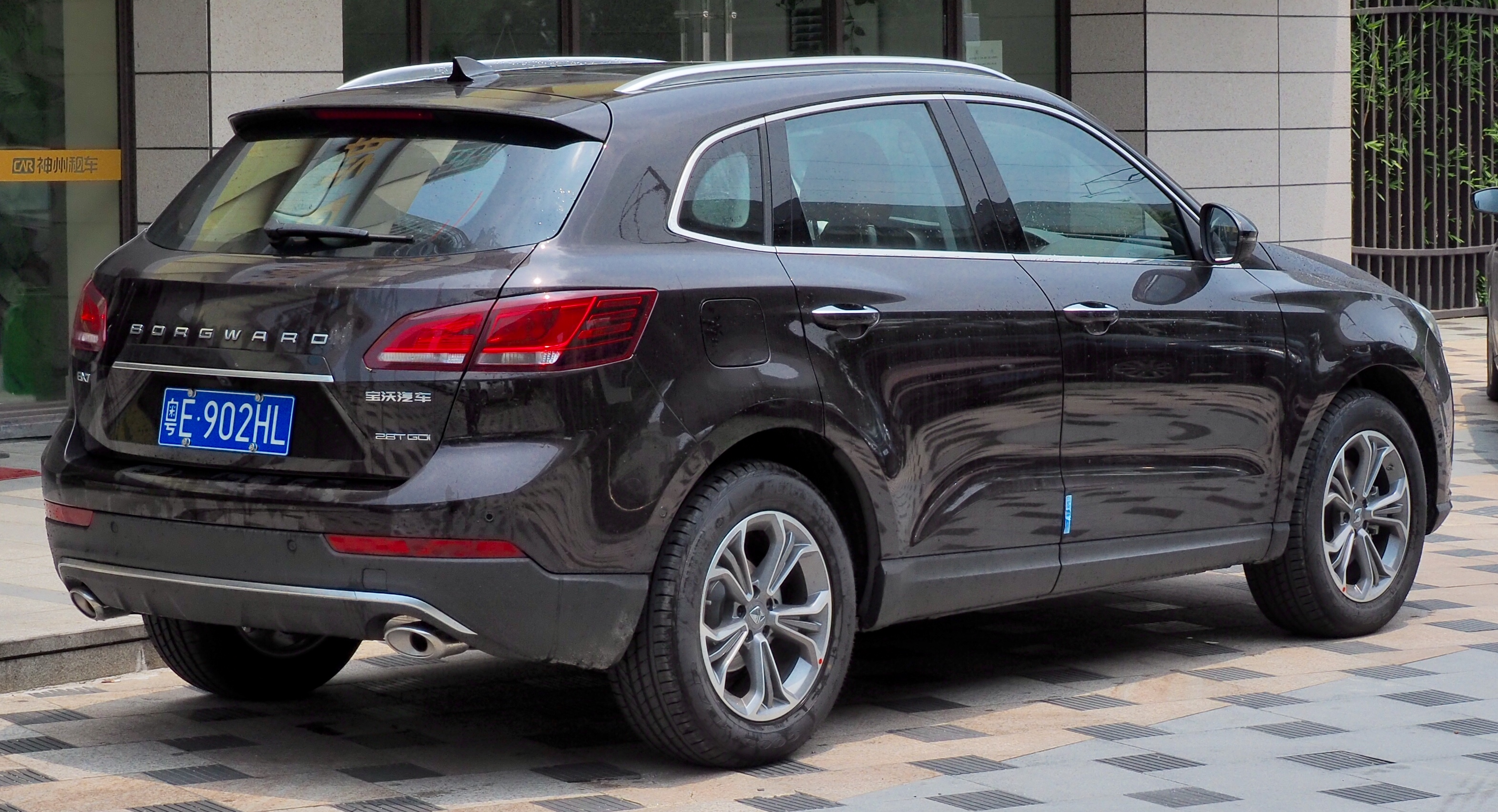
Borgward BX7 rear

The BX7 is the first model of the newly resurrected Borgward company, which made its return after a 45-year hiatus at the 2015 Geneva Motor Show. Borgward ended production in Mexico in 1970 with the 230GL as its final model. Developed with the help of Chinese truck manufacturer Foton, the BX7 is Borgward's first entry into the SUV market. It was first unveiled to the public at the 2015 International Motor Show in Frankfurt, Germany.

Two trim levels are available, the BX7 28T, and the upper range BX7 TS (Touring Sedan). Features exclusive to the TS model include a more upscale interior, a different grille pattern composed of several small diamonds similar to the Borgward logo, larger wheels, a roof rack, and an overall sportier exterior design. Five, six and seven-passenger seating configurations will be offered as well.

Both models are powered by a turbocharged 2.0-liter inline-four engine producing 225 horsepower. Power is delivered to all four wheels through a Six-speed Torque-Converter made by AISIN. A 401-horsepower plug-in hybrid version with an electric range of 34 miles will be added to the lineup at a later date.

The Borgward BX7 is produced at Foton's Beijing assembly plant and the car is based on Senova X65, but with a unique design of the interior, front and rear. The car is based on the same GM2900 platform as the Senova, which originated from that of the Saab 9-3. BAIC group (the owner of Foton), purchased the right to use the platform along with other technology from the now defunct Swedish automaker Saab back in 2009.

The BX7 is sold in China starting July 2016, there was a plan to sold in Germany and other European markets within the next two years but didn’t proceed.
