= Mercury KG-7Q Super 10 Hurricane =

Mercury Super 10 Hurricane is an outboard motor built by Kiekhaefer Mercury during the years of 1950 through 1952.

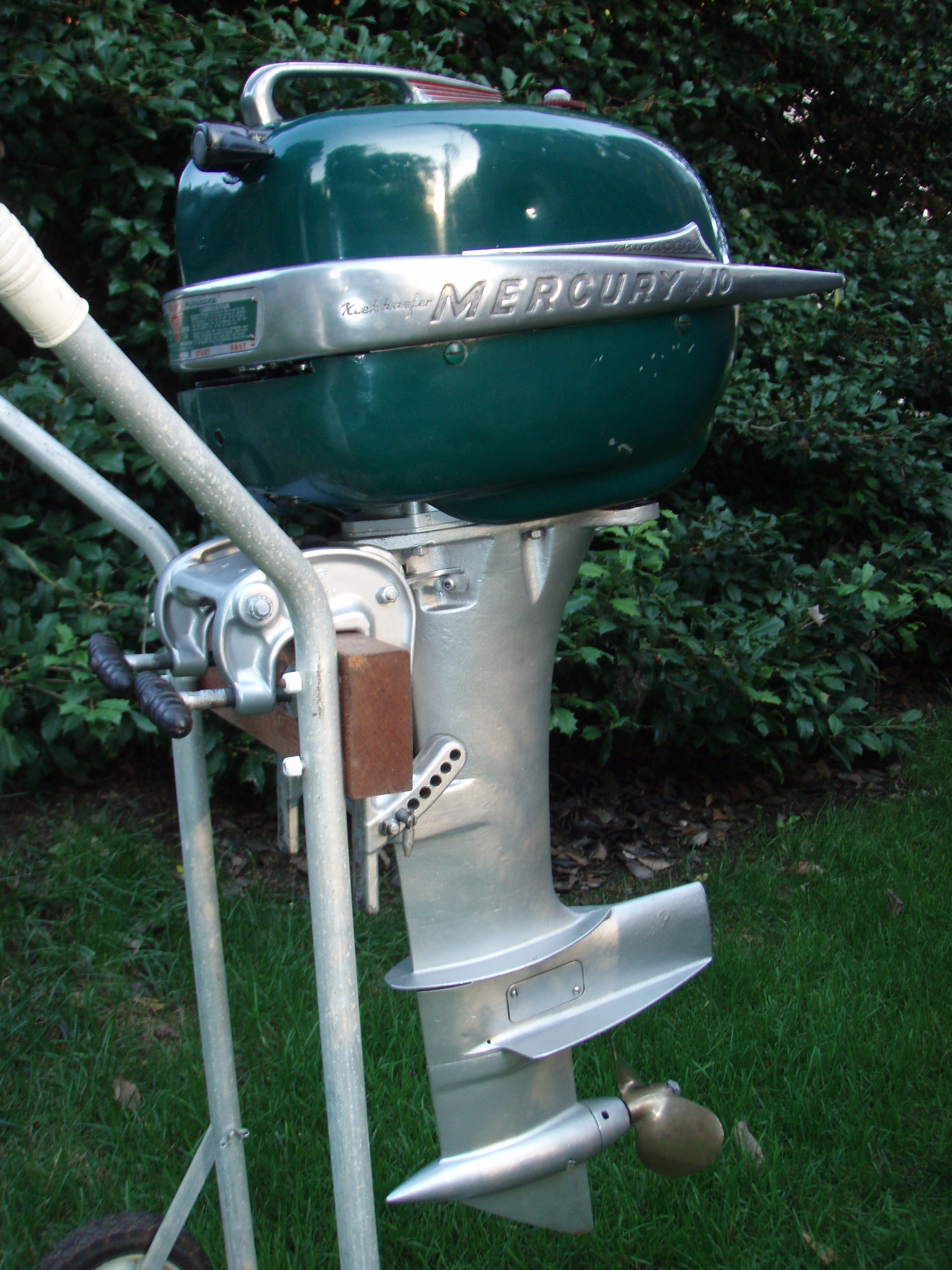
1951 Mercury KG-7Q Super 10 Hurricane

== History and development ==
In 1950 Mercury engineers came out with the Super 10 Hurricane, Model KG-7. This motor was based on previous models KE-7 Lightning and KF-7 Super 10 Lightning. Upgrades included redesigned connecting rods, upgraded aluminum clamp and swivel brackets, a new higher RPM magneto, improved porting, an 8 Reed valve cage (as opposed to KE-7 and KF-7's 4) and larger crankcase opening. Hurricane was also advertised at 10 hp*, way below the actual horsepower developed, Mercury noted this asterisk by stating that horsepower varies with rpm; really the Hurricane could deliver up to 18 hp. Dubbed "Super" because they were superior in horsepower to other 10 hp outboards. Shortly after the introduction of the Hurricane, Mercury came up with their first performance gear case with the capability of mating to a standard driveshaft housing of a KG-7, KF-7, or KE-7. This was named “Quicksilver” and promised an extra 20 to 30% increase in top speed. Essentially, it boasted a significantly slimmer pointed gear case that housed an integrated rubber rotex water pump and forward only 1:1 gears along with the necessary bearings. After a few months of use, Mercury found that the average race boat's transom would not elevate the standard driveshaft housing and quicksilver gear case high enough for peak performance. Rectifying this problem, Mercury developed the Quicksilver driveshaft housing. This new driveshaft housing was three inches shorter which in turn lowered the motor's center of gravity on the boat which helped turning ability, reduced the strain on the boat's transom and motor's clamp brackets, and decreased underwater drag while increasing top speed as less gearcase was below the boat. Also the tiller arm was removed necessitating the use of a remote throttle and steering wheel. In addition the housing had a redesigned lower anti-cavitation plate, protruding forward upper spray plate, a rear-mounted steering bar design, and finally, an exhaust opening above the water surface that reduced exhaust back pressure while increasing noise levels when the boat was on plane. When the dealer installed the quicksilver driveshaft housing and gear case (packaged at $82.25) he had authorization to hand stamp a small "Q" behind the serial numbers on the tag and block. Some did, some did not – and so, the "Stamped Q" came to be. 1951 saw the first production race-ready outboard models; KG-4Q, KG7-Q, and KG-9Q. These motors were pulled off the production line at random, given the quicksilver gear case, driveshaft housing, and "Q" stamp behind the tag serial number and block serial number. These KG-7Qs worked fine on runabouts but were too long for hydroplanes – and the racers made this known to Mercury. So thus was born the 2" shorter "H" driveshaft housing in 1952. Right before Mercury released this "H" driveshaft housing, they still had several "Q" length driveshaft housings, so they introduced a factory KG-7Q which had a green silk screened Q behind the serial number on the tag and a factory stamped "Q" on the block. These motors are very rare; they fall into the serial range of 532404–532963.

== Continued interest ==
Today a few Mercury KG-7Q Super 10 Hurricane's have survived the years waiting to be run or displayed at a local Antique Outboard Motor Club, Inc. (AOMCI) Event. In demand and also rare; today a KG-7Q will go for the price of a brand new 10 hp motor.
