= Senova X65 =

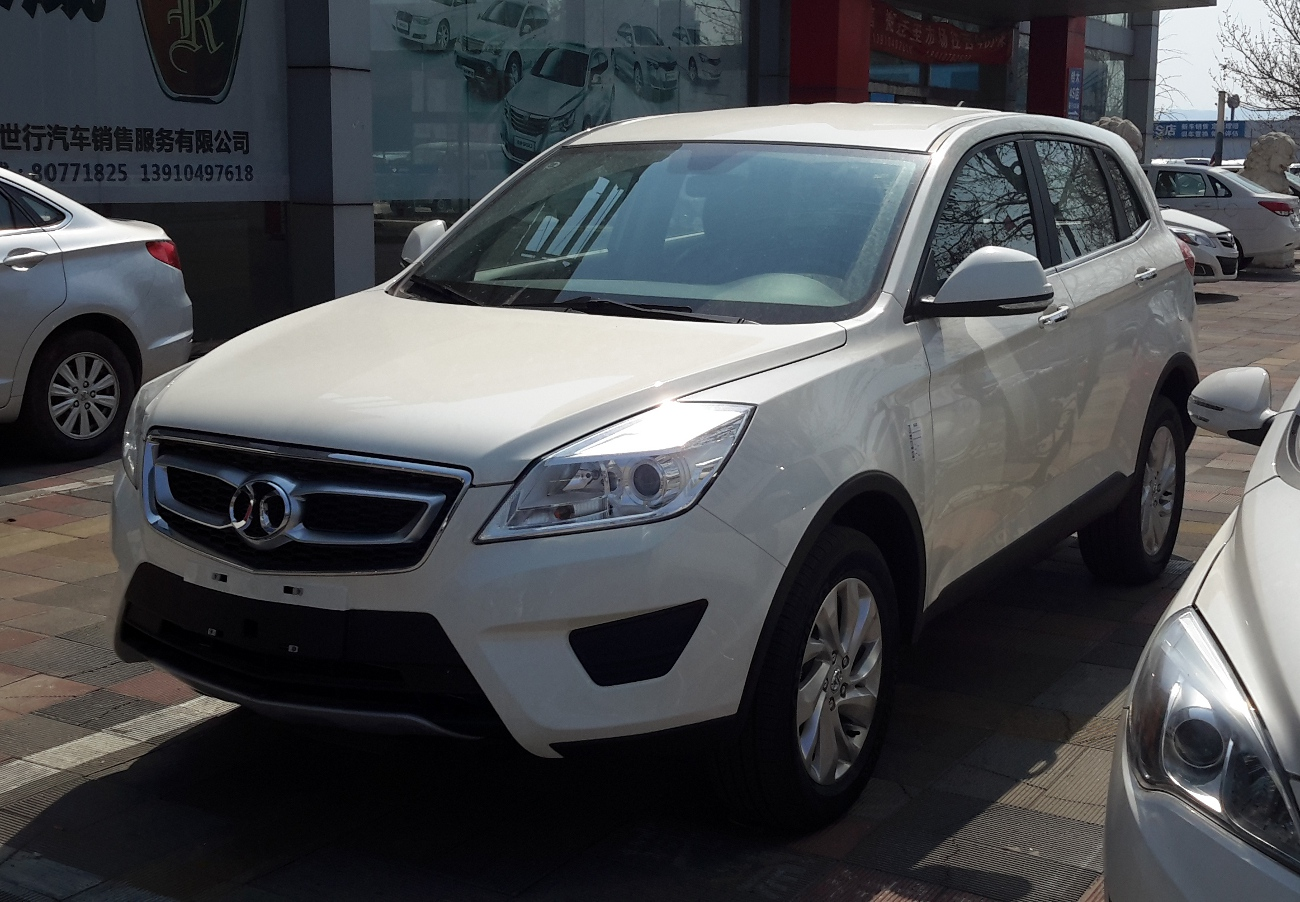

Overview
- Manufacturer: Senova
- Also called: Weiwang S50
- Production: 2014–2017
- Model years: 2014–2017

Body and chassis
- Class: Compact crossover SUV
- Body style: 5-door SUV
- Layout: FF
- Related: Weiwang S50; Weiwang S60; Borgward BX7

Powertrain
- Engine: 1.5 L I4 (turbo petrol); 2.0 L B205 I4 (turbo petrol); 2.5 L I4 (turbo petrol)
- Transmission: 5-speed manual 6-speed automatic

Dimensions
- Wheelbase: 2,670 mm (105.1 in)
- Length: 4,645 mm (182.9 in)
- Width: 1,816 mm (71.5 in)
- Height: 1,680 mm (66.1 in)

Chronology
- Successor: Beijing X7

The Senova X65 is a compact crossover SUV produced by Senova, a sub-brand of BAIC Motor. The Senova X65 debuted on the 2014 Guangzhou Auto Show in November 2014 as Senova's first CUV and was available on the Chinese market in March 2015 with prices ranging from 98,000 yuan to 149,800 yuan ($15,889 – 24,090), positioning the crossover above the later revealed compact Senova X55 CUV.

== Development ==
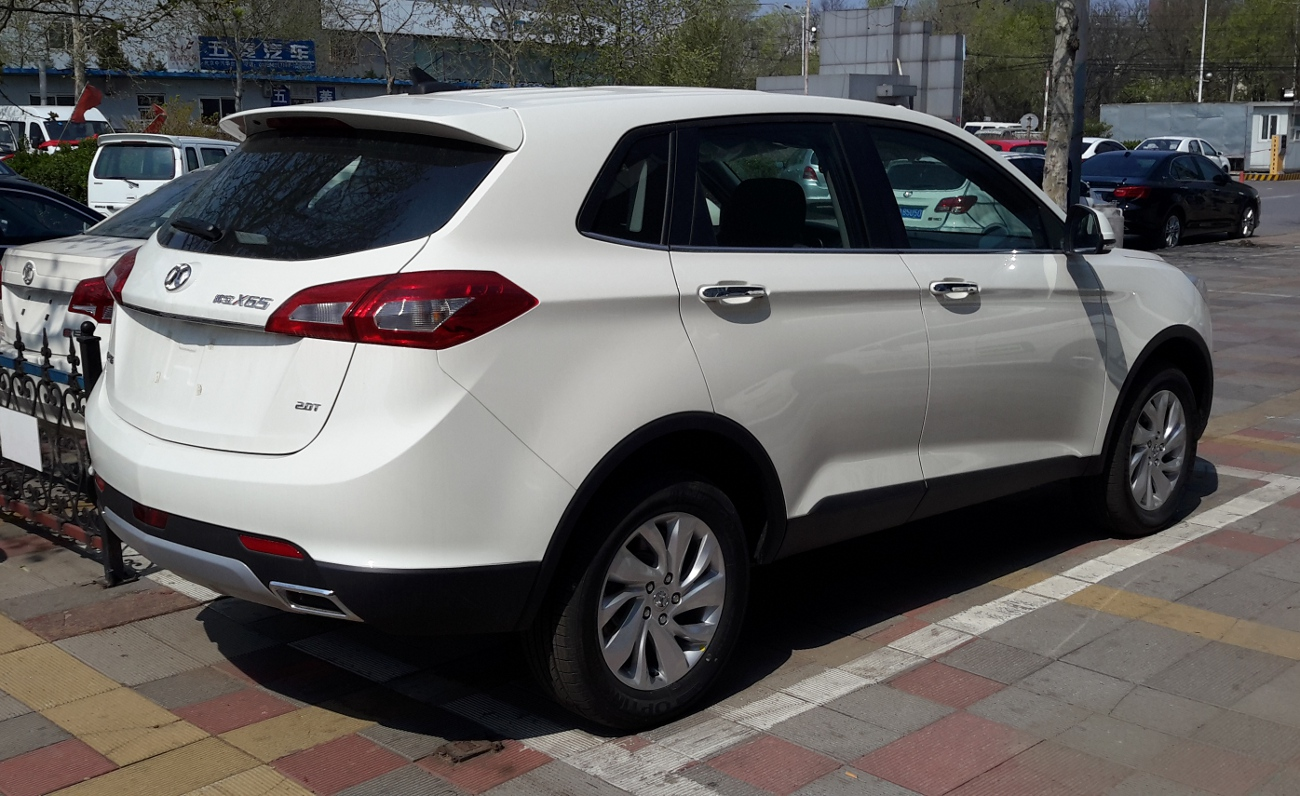
Senova X65 rear

Previously known as the Beijing Auto C51X during development phase, the Senova X65 is based on the Matrix platform developed by Beijing Auto, which is derived from the platform of the Saab 9-3. As the parent company of Beijing Auto, BAIC purchased the platforms from GM in 2009 and further developed multiple vehicles based on the platform.

The Senova X65 is powered by a 2.0 liter inline-four turbo engine producing 132 kW (177 hp), with the engine mated to a 5-speed manual transmission or a 6-speed automatic transmission.

== Weiwang S50 ==
The Beijing Auto Weiwang S50 CUV debuted on the 2016 Beijing Auto Show, and was sold under the Weiwang, a sub-brand of Beijing Auto. The Weiwang S50 is based on the Senova X65 and being essentially a badge engineered model with restyled grilles. The pricing of the Weiwang S50 was positioned just below the Senova X65, with prices starting around 95,000 yuan. The Weiwang S50 is powered by the same 1.5L turbo engine as the Huansu S6, producing 110 kW (150 hp) and 200 N⋅m (148 lb⋅ft) of torque, mating to a 6-speed manual or a 6-speed automatic gearbox.

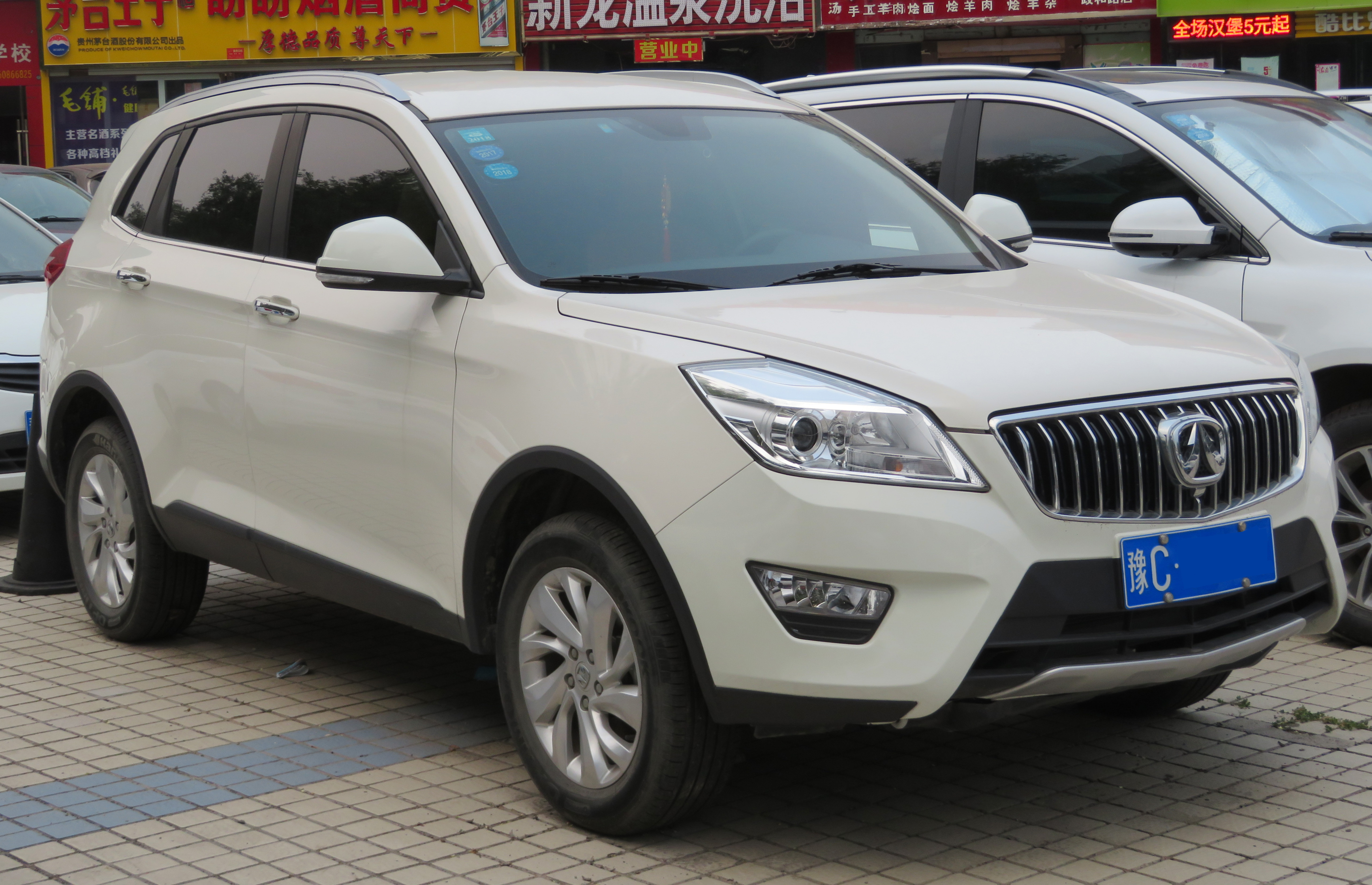
Weiwang S50

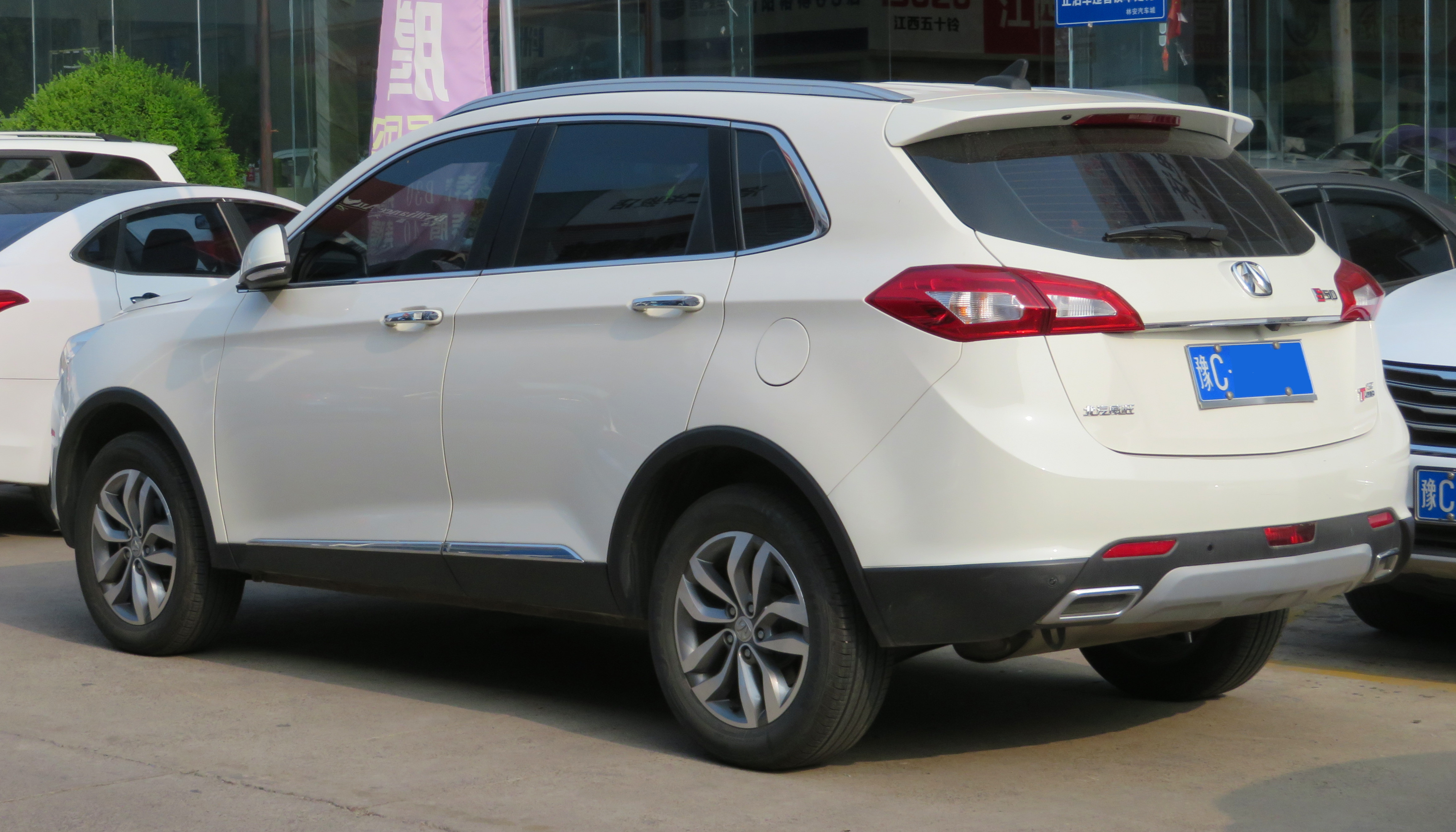
Weiwang S50 rear

== Discontinuation ==
Production of the Senova X65 ended in 2017, and plans for its successor had been made. After years of development, another compact crossover, the Beijing X7, made its official launch in 2020.
