= Huansu S7 =

Chinese CUV

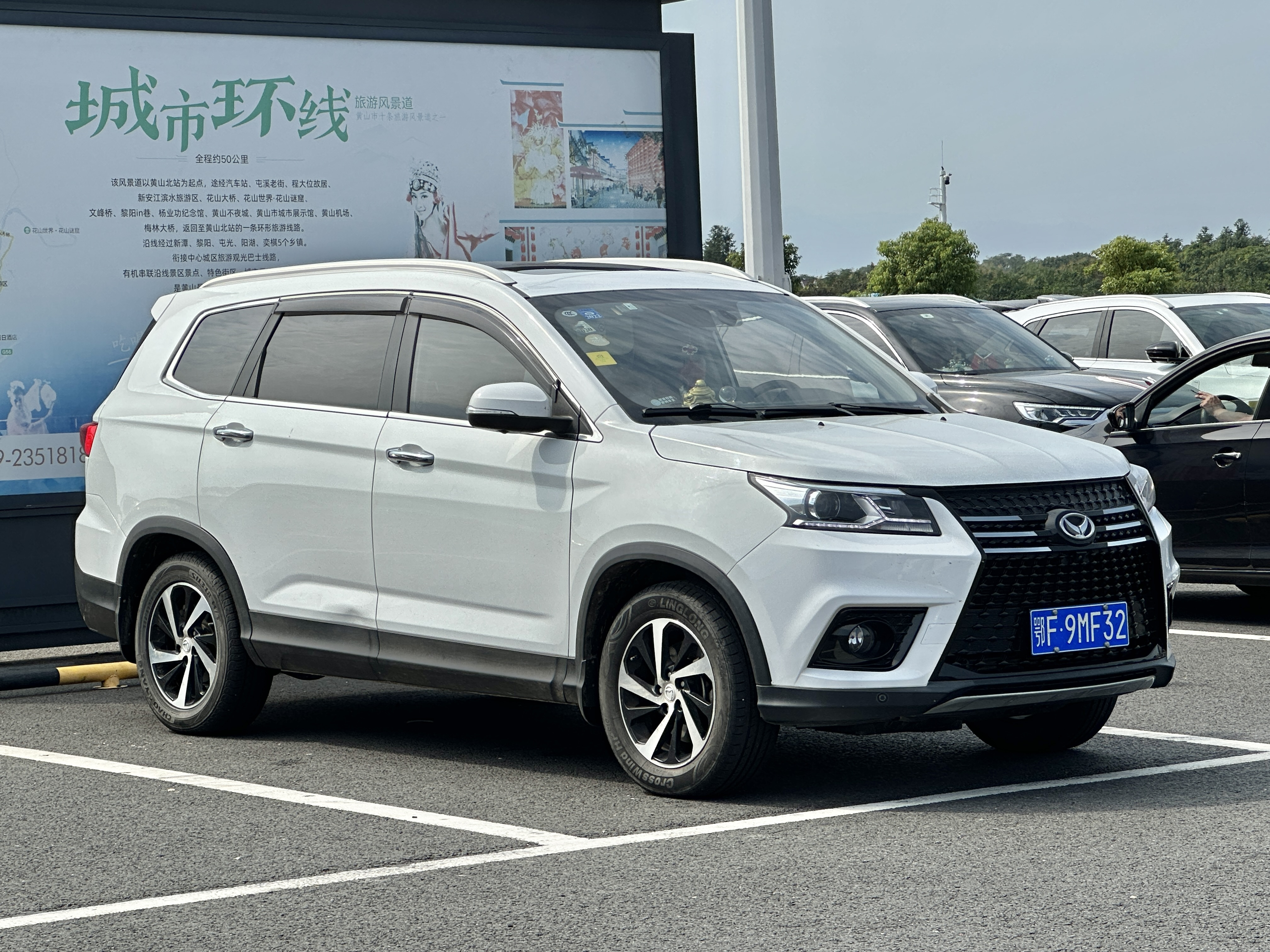

Overview
- Manufacturer: Huansu-BAIC Group
- Production: 2016–2019
- Model years: 2017–2019

Body and chassis
- Class: Mid-size CUV
- Body style: 5-door station wagon
- Layout: FF
- Related: Huansu S5; Senova X55

Powertrain
- Engine: 1.5 L 'I4 turbo
- Transmission: 5-speed manual; CVT

Dimensions
- Wheelbase: 2,780 mm (109.4 in)
- Length: 4,800 mm (189.0 in)
- Width: 1,850 mm (72.8 in)
- Height: 1,775 mm (69.9 in)
- Curb weight: 1,630–1,710 kg (3,594–3,770 lb)

The Huansu S7 is a 7-seat mid-size CUV produced by Huansu, a sub-brand of BAIC Motor and Yinxiang Group.

== Overview ==
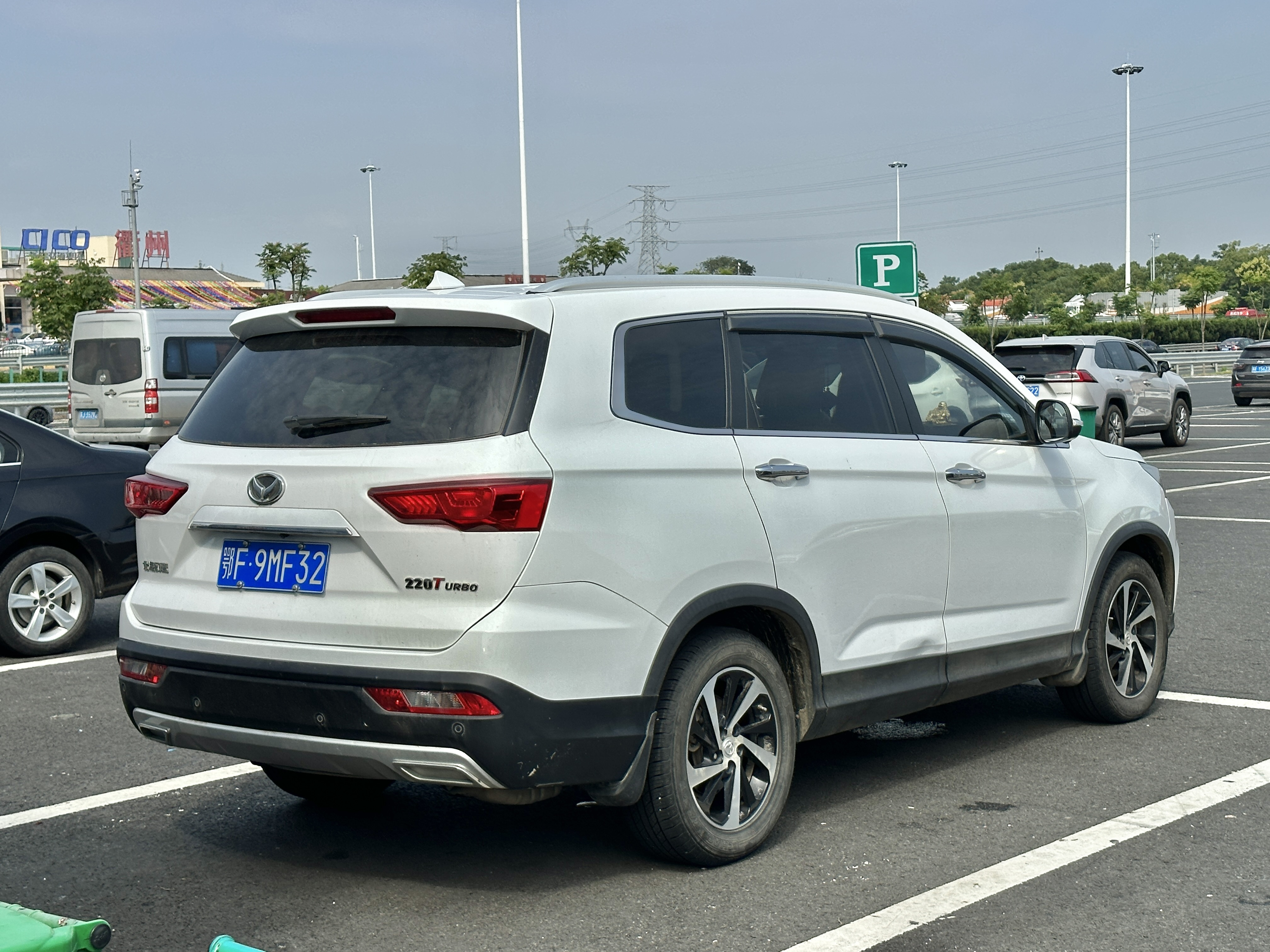
Huansu S7 rear quarter

The Huansu S7 is manufactured by Beiqi Yinxiang Automobile, and essentially the 7-seater variant of the Huansu S5 which is based on the same platform as the Senova X55, the Huansu S7 was officially launched in Q4 2017, with prices ranging from 78,800 yuan to 115,800 yuan at launch.

The Huansu S7 is powered by a 1.5-litre turbocharged four-cylinder petrol engine with 110 kW (150 hp) mated to a five-speed manual transmission.

=== Huansu S7L ===
The Huangsu S7L is a sports appearance variant of the S7 and was launched in April 2018. The S7L is powered by a 2.0-litre turbo engine of the regular S7 while featuring a redesigned front end.
