= Beijing Mofang =

Compact crossover SUV

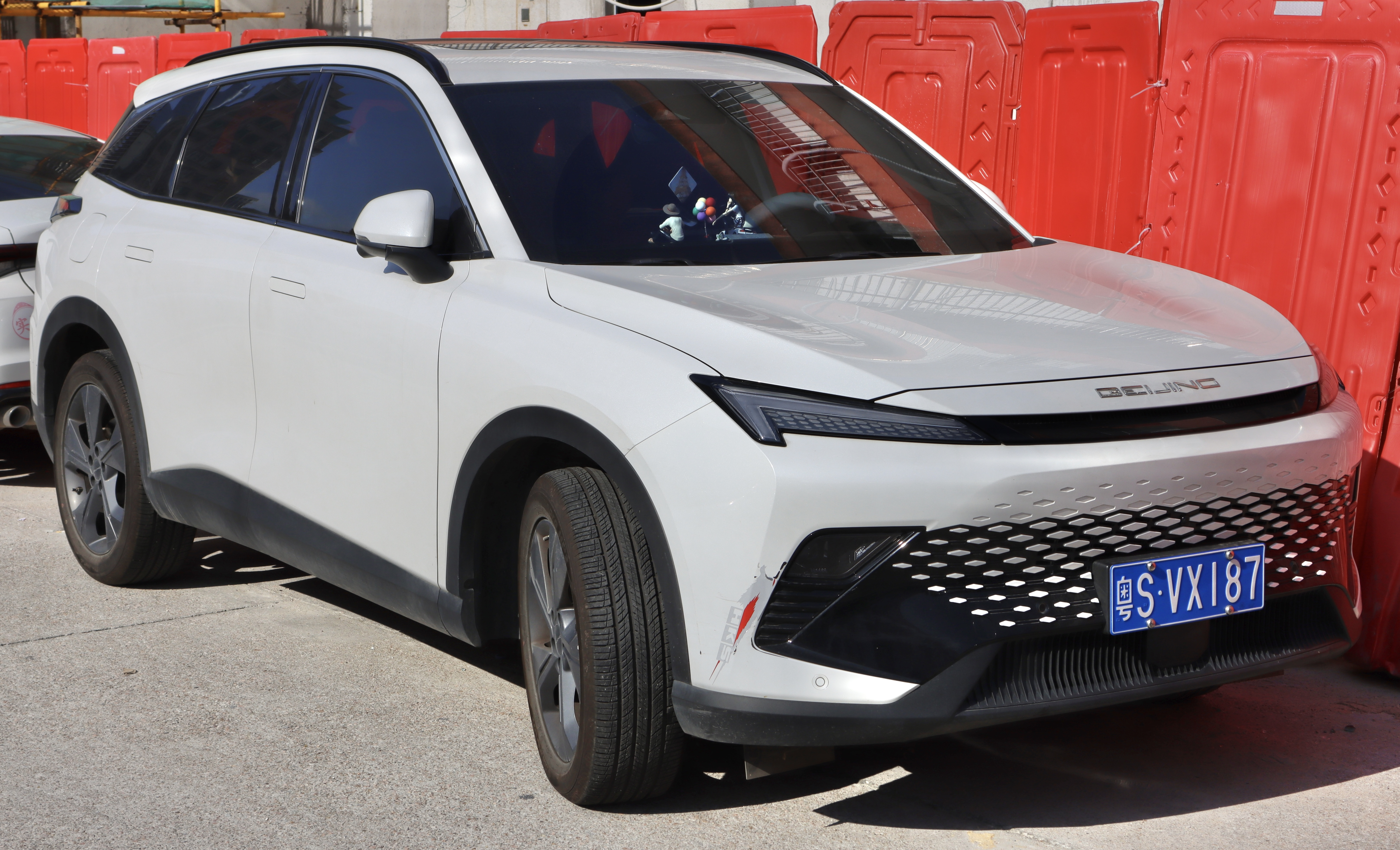

Overview
- Manufacturer: Beijing (BAIC)
- Model code: C52X
- Also called: Beijing X6 (during development); BAIC Beijing X55; BAIC X55; BAIC Beijing 5 (Poland); Tiger Six (Italy); Cirelli 4 (Italy, until 2024)
- Production: 2022–2025 (China); 2022–present (export)
- Model years: 2023–present
- Assembly: China: Zhuzhou; Malaysia: Melaka (EPMB); Russia: Kaliningrad (Avtotor); Sri Lanka : Colombo David Peris Automobiles; South Africa: Gqeberha
- Designer: Xu Ming

Body and chassis
- Class: Compact SUV (C)
- Body style: 5-door crossover SUV
- Layout: Front-engine, front-wheel-drive
- Platform: BMFA
- Related: Beijing X7

Powertrain
- Engine: Petrol: 1.5 L A156T2H Magic Core VGT I4
- Transmission: 7-speed DCT

Dimensions
- Wheelbase: 2,735 mm (107.7 in)
- Length: 4,620 mm (181.9 in)
- Width: 1,886 mm (74.3 in)
- Height: 1,680 mm (66.1 in)
- Curb weight: 1,550 kg (3,417 lb)

The Beijing Mofang (Chinese: 北京魔方), translated to Rubik's Cube in English sources, also known globally as the BAIC Beijing X55 or simply BAIC X55, is a compact SUV produced by the Chinese automaker BAIC Group under the company's Beijing passenger car marque.

== Overview ==
Codenamed "C52X" during its development, it was first teased on 10 November 2021 under the placeholder name "Beijing X6", with its official name was determined by a public voting campaign ran by BAIC. A pre-production prototype was unveiled at the 2021 Guangzhou International Motor Show, subsequently revealing Mofang as its official name. The full production model was revealed in April 2022. Sales commenced in China on 28 July 2022. It is the first internal-combustion vehicle in the Chinese domestic market to use Huawei’s HarmonyOS.

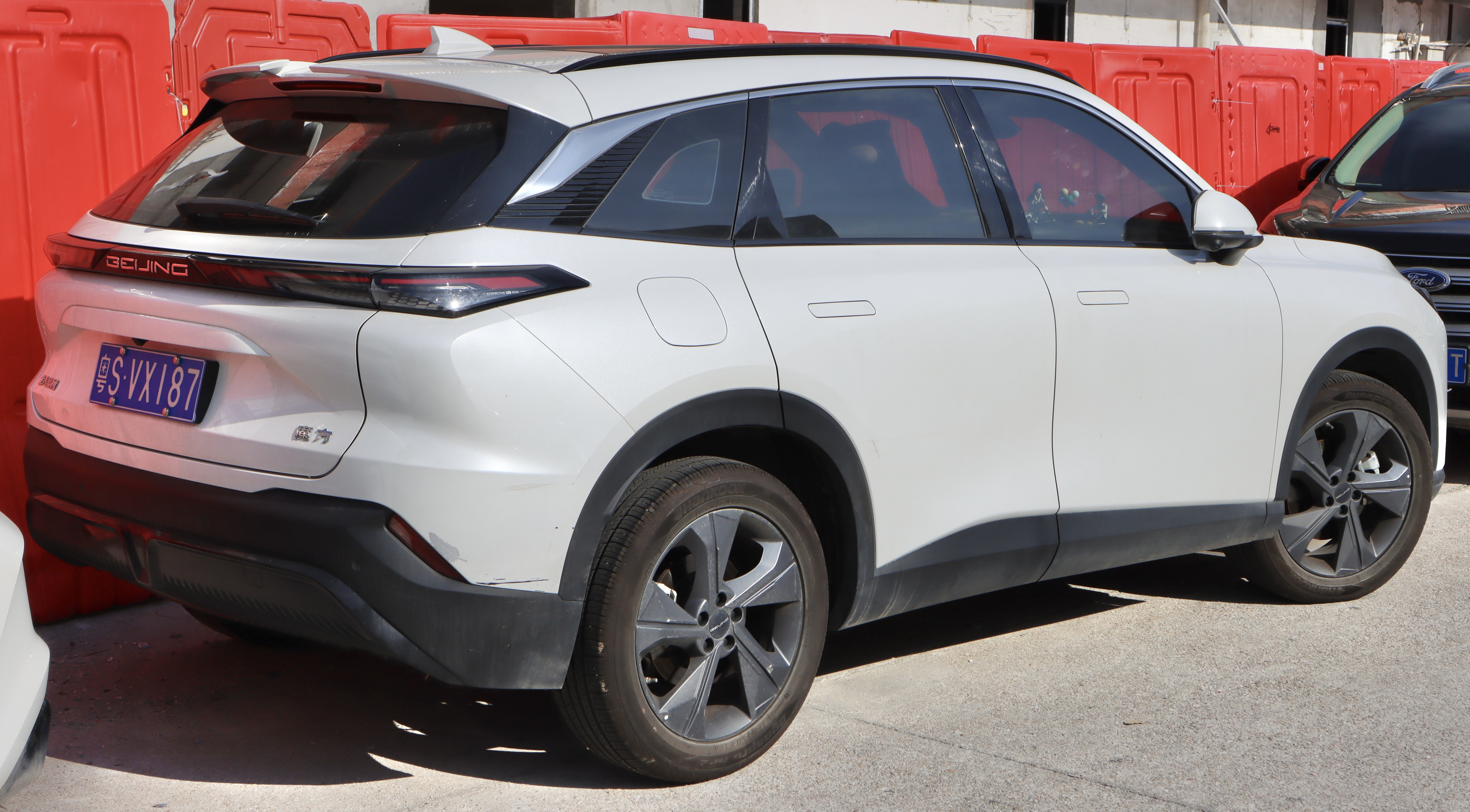
Rear view

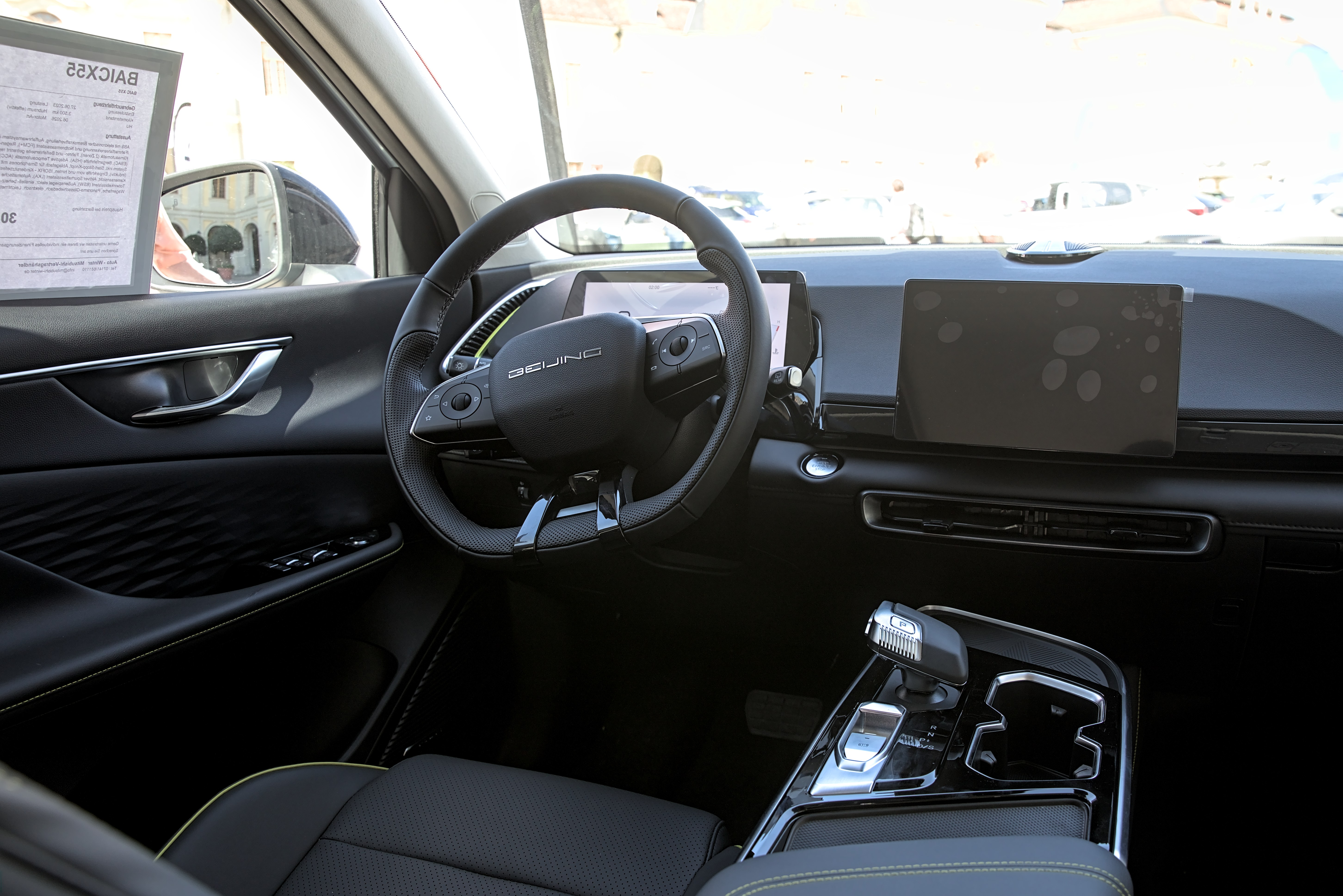
Interior

== Powertrain ==
The Mofang is available with one engine; a 1.5-litre Magic Core variable-geometry turbocharged (VGT) petrol engine, developed in collaboration with the German automotive parts manufacturer Meta GmbH. The engine is rated at 130 kW (177 PS; 174 hp) and 305 N⋅m (31.1 kg⋅m; 225 lb⋅ft) of torque, and is mated with a 7-speed dual-clutch transmission (DCT).

== Export markets ==
Outside China, the Mofang is sold as the BAIC Beijing X55. The "X55" nameplate was previously used by BAIC's defunct marque Senova for its Beijing X5 sold between 2015 and 2020.

In some markets, it is simply sold as the BAIC X55. Earlier, the moniker was initially referred by some countries' marketing materials, but despite this, the vehicle itself retained the physical 'BEIJING' emblems on the front bumper, rear center taillight panel and steering wheel. Since around late 2024 or early 2025, Philippines, where it was marketed as the X55 Verve, becomes the first country to remove the physical 'BEIJING' emblems from the vehicle and adopted the 'BAIC X55' moniker (albeit with the additional but non-physical 'Verve' suffix) with 'BAIC' emblems taking in place.

Some markets may also have additional different suffixes applied to the model, notably II. Other suffixes include Plus, and Verve in the Philippines.

=== Europe ===
==== Poland ====
In Poland, the Mofang is marketed as the Beijing 5. It was introduced in December 2023 as one of BAIC's first models in the Polish market, alongside the Beijing 3 and Beijing 7.

==== Russia ====
The Mofang was introduced for the Russian market in September 2023 as the X55, although retaining the physical 'BEIJING' emblems. Initial variants include the Comfort and Elite, with the Luxury variant was added in April 2024. It is locally assembled at Avtotor's facility in Kaliningrad, with production commencing in August 2023.

=== Mexico ===
Mexican models were launched in July 2023 as the Beijing X55, only available with a single trim level: Honor.

=== South Africa ===
The Mofang made its South African debut in October 2022 as the Beijing X55, before going on sale in November 2022. Variants include the Dynamic, Elite and Premium.

The updated version, bearing with an additional Plus suffix, was revealed in August 2024 at the 2024 Kyalami Festival of Motoring, and went on sale in September 2024. Changes for the update include type-C USB ports, voice command recognition system, an option of a black leather interior colour, and two new exterior colours; Krypton Grey and Turquoise Blue. The Elite and Premium variants receive 19-inch alloy wheels.

=== South America ===
The Mofang was launched in select South American countries under different monikers, such as Peru in June 2023 and Chile in July 2023 as the X55 Plus, and Argentina in August 2023 as the X55 II. Although marketing materials to those countries refer the vehicle simply as the 'BAIC X55', it retains the physical 'BEIJING' emblems. Depending on the market, it is available in different trim levels as follows:

Trims	Argentina	Chile	Ecuador	Peru	Venezuela
Trims		Comfort	Elite	Comfort	
Trims		Elite	Luxury	Exclusive	
Trims	Luxury		Premium	Signature	Luxury

=== Southeast Asia ===
==== Indonesia ====
The Mofang was introduced in Indonesia on 14 May 2024 as the X55 II, although retaining the physical 'BEIJING' emblems. Sales were commenced in July 2024 at the 31st Gaikindo Indonesia International Auto Show. It is one of BAIC's first models sold in the country, alongside the BJ40 Plus.

On 29 April 2025, the X55 II received a minor update. Responding to the poor sales of the 2024 model, the 'BEIJING' emblems were replaced by 'BAIC' emblems. An entry-level variant, dubbed the "Lite", was also introduced, with the previous single variant was renamed to "Prime". Other changes include an integration of Apple CarPlay and Android Auto to its infotainment system, a cool box on its centre console, and a Platinum Black exterior colour.

==== Malaysia ====
The Mofang will be sold in Malaysia as the X55 in the fourth quarter of 2024. For the Malaysian market, it will be locally assembled at EP Manufacturing's new facility in Melaka by 2025.

Three examples of the vehicle were first showcased in October 2023 during the ground-breaking ceremony event of EP Manufacturing's Melaka facility, initially referred as the X55 II. A pre-production model with the finalized X55 nameplate was introduced on 16 May 2024, alongside the BJ40 Plus. Two variants will be available at launch: Standard and Premium.

==== Philippines ====
In the Philippines, the Mofang is marketed as the X55 Verve. It was introduced in March 2024, alongside the B40 Ragnar, B60 Beaumont, B80 Wagon and X7 Grandeza, coinciding with the re-launch of the BAIC brand in the country for the second time, following its distribution acquisition by the local distributor United Asia Automotive Group Inc. (UAAGI). Sales were commenced in April 2024 at the 19th Manila International Auto Show. Excluding the 'Verve' suffix, despite being referred simply as the 'BAIC X55' in marketing materials, it retains the physical 'BEIJING' emblems. The emblems were changed to 'BAIC' since around late 2024 or early 2025.

==== Sri Lanka ====
This is assembled in Sri Lanka and sold as "Beijing X55". There are two models. "Honor" which is the basic and "Luxury" which is the higher spec.

== Rebadged versions ==
=== Cirelli 4 ===
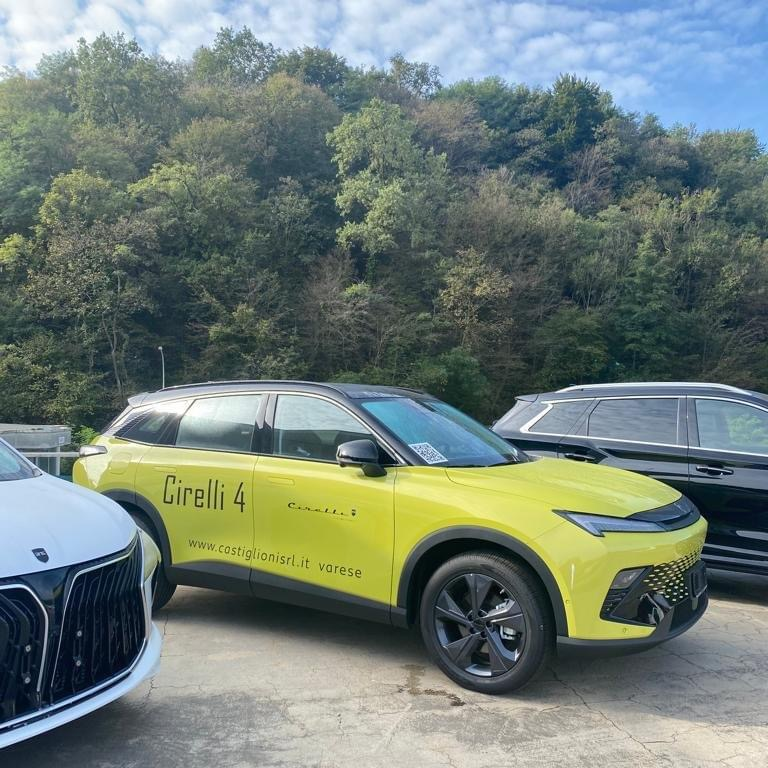
Cirelli 4 (Italy, until 2024)

Up until 2024, Cirelli Motor Company formerly marketed the Mofang in Italy as the Cirelli 4. Unlike other markets, alongside the conventional petrol, the Cirelli 4 features an option of a bi-fuel (petrol/LPG) setup. It was replaced by a version based on the second-generation Fengon 580 from Dongfeng Motor Corporation.

=== Tiger Six ===
DR Automobiles will be marketing the Mofang for select European markets as the Tiger Six, under the company's Tiger marque. It was revealed in September 2024 at the 2024 Salone Auto Torino. The Six features a different front grille design.

== Sales ==
Year	China
2023	7,715
2024	4,648
2025	337
