= Beijing X7 =

Compact crossover SUV

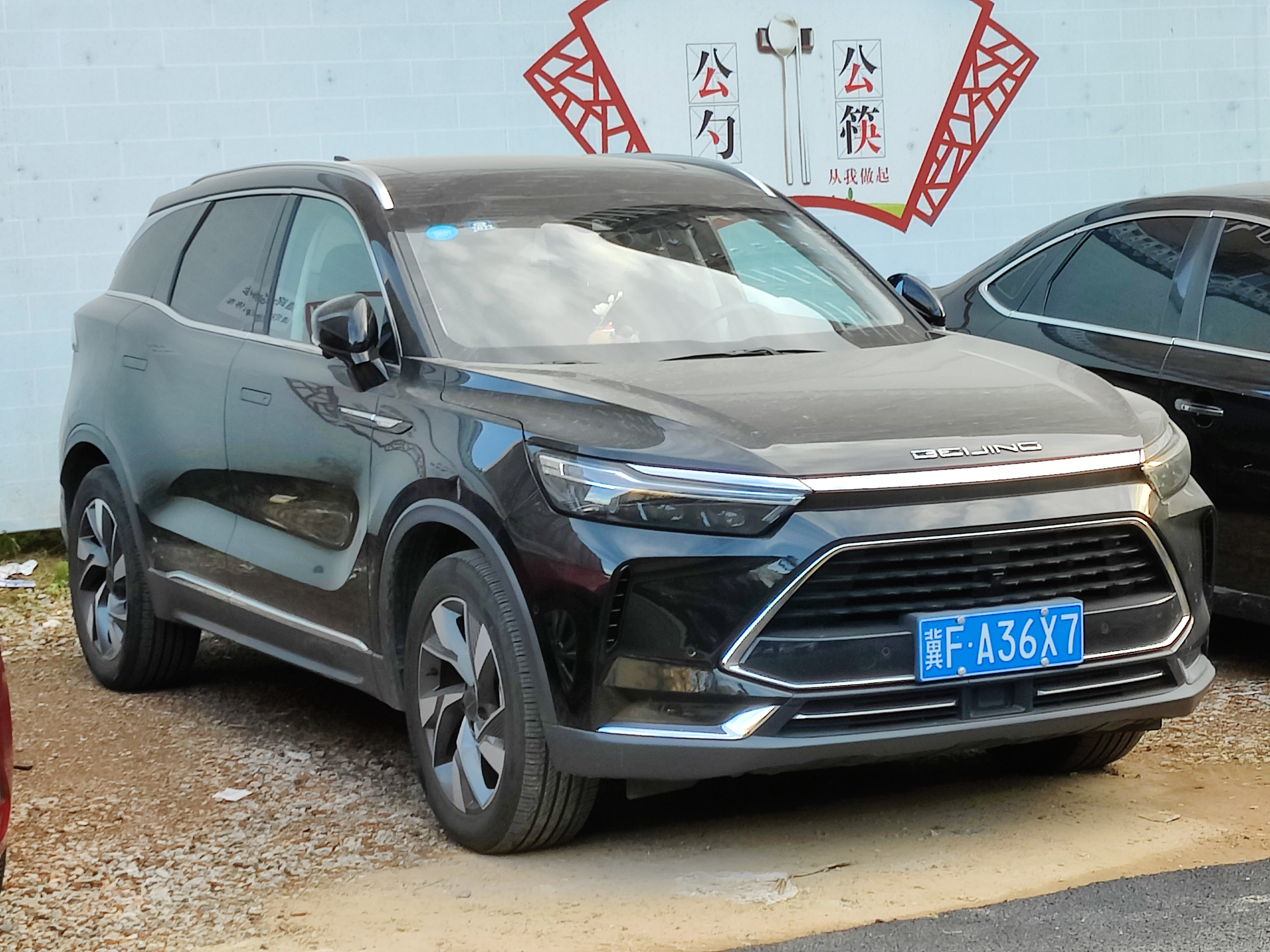

Overview
- Manufacturer: Beijing (BAIC)
- Also called: BAIC X7; BAIC X75; BAIC Beijing 7 (Poland); Tiger Eight (Italy)
- Production: 2020–present
- Model years: 2021–present
- Assembly: Zengcheng, China; Kaliningrad, Russia
- Designer: Frank Wu

Body and chassis
- Class: Compact SUV
- Body style: 5-door crossover SUV
- Layout: FF
- Platform: BMFA
- Related: Beijing Mofang

Powertrain
- Engine: 1.5 L I4 (turbo gasoline)
- Transmission: 6-speed manual 7-speed DCT

Dimensions
- Wheelbase: 2,800 mm (110.2 in)
- Length: 4,710 mm (185.4 in)
- Width: 1,892 mm (74.5 in)
- Height: 1,715 mm (67.5 in)

The Beijing X7 is a compact SUV produced by Beijing, a sub-brand of BAIC Motor.

== Development ==
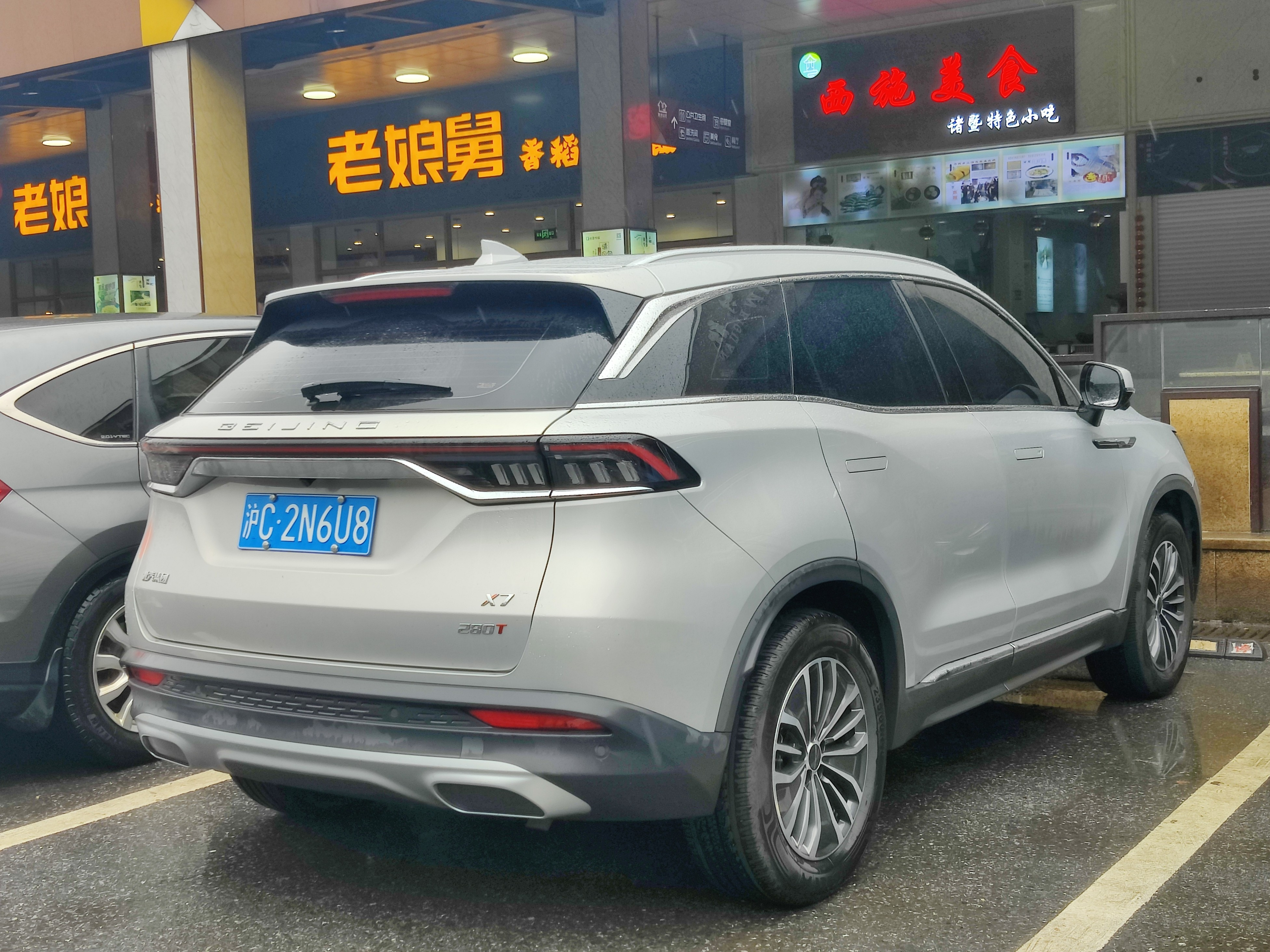
Rear view

The Beijing X7 was previewed by the Yao concept car which introduced the new family design language of the revamped brand from BAIC Motor.

The Beijing X7 is built on the BMFA (Beijing Modular Functional Architecture) platform by BAIC Motor. The platform will underpin future traditional fuel vehicle models and plug-in hybrid vehicle models. According to BAIC, the Beijing X7 started pre-sale in May 2020 and was officially listed in June 2020.

== Specifications ==
The Beijing X7 is available with two power combinations, the 1.5-litre turbo gasoline engine and the plug-in hybrid version with the 1.5-litre turbo gasoline engine. The 1.5 liter turbo engine produces a maximum power of 188 hp (140 kW; 191 PS) and a peak torque of 275 N⋅m (203 lb⋅ft; 28 kg⋅m). The transmission system is available with options including a 6-speed manual gearbox or a 7-speed dual-clutch transmission.

The Beijing X7 features AR live navigation, IoV, and vehicle interconnection systems. Active conversational voice interaction can also be realized via the in-vehicle interconnection system. Additionally, the Beijing X7 is also equipped with face recognition function, automatic seat adjustment, and active fatigue driving monitoring. For safety features, the X7 is equipped with 17 configurations including one-key automatic parking and traffic congestion assistance, with L2 level driving assistance enabled via software updates.

=== 2023 (facelift) ===
The Beijing X7 received a facelift for the 2024 model year. The 2023 facelift features restyled front and rear end designs with a 1.5-liter turbo inline-4 engine codenamed A156T2H, developing a maximum output of 188hp.

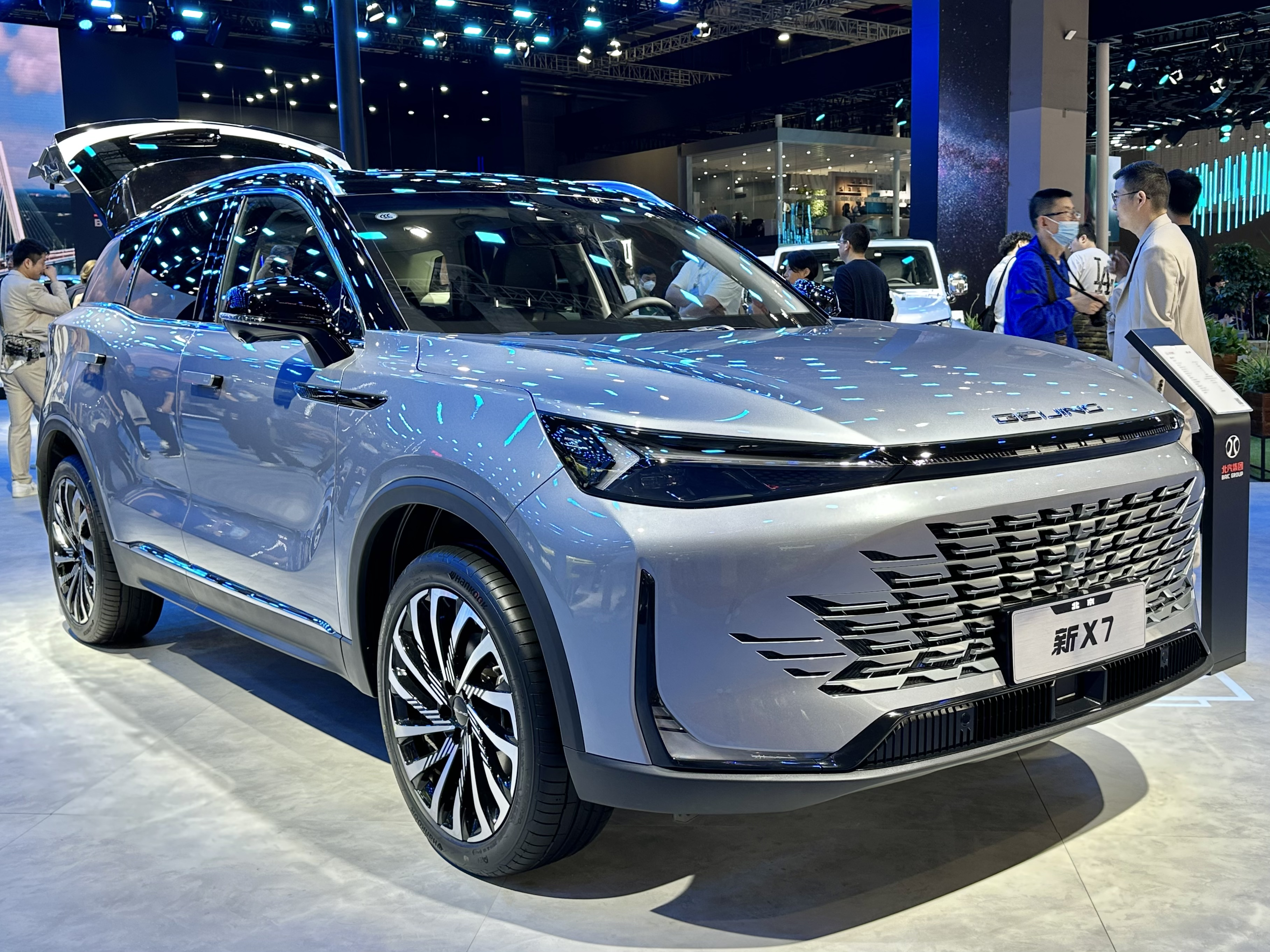
Beijing X7 2023 (facelift)

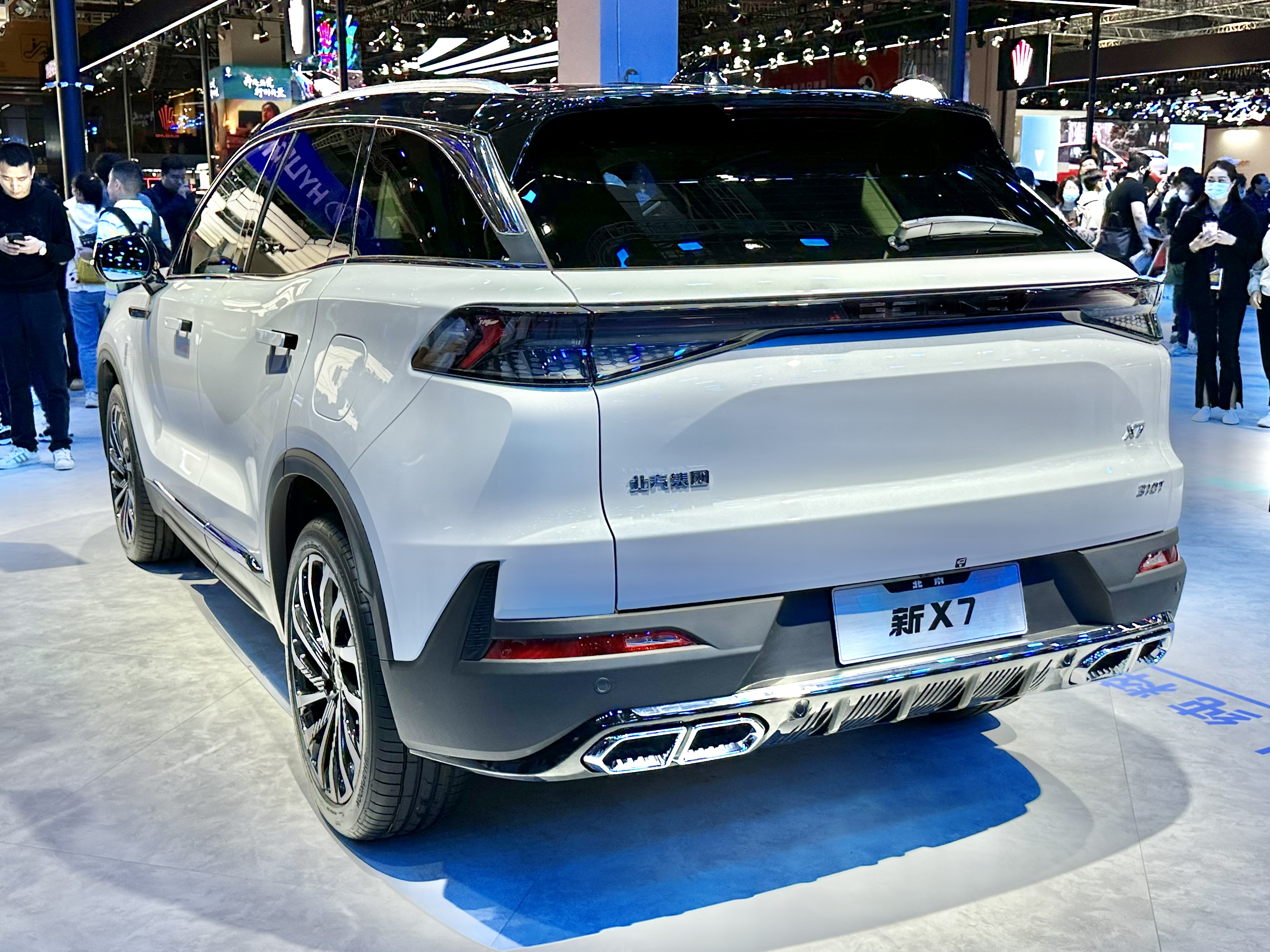
Rear view

== Sales ==
| Year | China |
|---|---|
| 2023 | 7,815 |
| 2024 | 5,862 |
| 2025 | 5,551 |
