= Beijing BJ60 =

Full-size SUV

Overview
- Manufacturer: BAIC Motor
- Also called: BAIC B60 Beaumont (export); Beijing Titan 700 (泰钽 700, 2026)
- Production: 2022–present
- Assembly: China

Body and chassis
- Class: Full-size SUV
- Body style: 5-door SUV
- Layout: Front-engine, four-wheel drive

Powertrain
- Engine: Petrol: 2.0 L I4 turbo + 48V; Diesel: 2.0 L I4 turbo; Petrol range extender: 1.5 L A156T2H I4 turbo
- Transmission: 8-speed automatic
- Hybrid drivetrain: Series hybrid
- Battery: 40.3 kWh NMC CALB; 49.4 kWh Xiaoyao NMC CATL
- Range: 1,200 km (750 mi) (Thunder)
- Electric range: 125 km (78 mi) (WLTP, Thunder); 165 km (103 mi) (WLTP, Titan 700)
- Plug-in charging: DC: 60 kW (Thunder)

Dimensions
- Wheelbase: 2,820 mm (111.0 in)
- Length: 5,040 mm (198.4 in) (exterior spare wheel)
- Width: 1,955 mm (77.0 in)
- Height: 1,925 mm (75.8 in)

The Beijing BJ60 is a full-size SUV produced by BAIC Motor under the Beijing off-road brand and debuted on the 2022 Beijing Auto Show.

== Overview ==
Rear view

Interior

The Beijing BJ60 is the largest off-road vehicle ever developed by Beijing off-road and is available as a five-seater and seven-seater vehicle. Initial released information indicates a hybrid powertrain as standard across the range with a 0–100 km/h (0–62 mph) acceleration time of under six seconds and a maximum range of 1,000 km (620 mi). Construction is a body-on-frame chassis underpinned with independent suspension with three locking differentials with an All-Terrain four-wheel-drive control system offered.

== Powertrain ==
Two 2.0-liter turbocharged four-cylinder petrol engines are listed with the 48-volt mild-hybrid technology and all powertrains are mated to an eight-speed automatic transmission. A 2.0-liter turbo-diesel engine with 48-volt mild-hybrid tech will also be available.

== Beijing BJ60 Thunder ==
The Beijing BJ60 Thunder is a facelifted range-extended hybrid variant launched in August 2024, featuring a dual-motor system called the Magic Core powered by a 40.3 kWh ternary lithium battery (NMC) and a 185 hp (138 kW; 188 PS) 1.5T range extender, providing a CLTC pure electric range of 152 kilometres (94 mi) and a total cruising range of 1,200 kilometres (750 mi). It has a 205 hp (153 kW; 208 PS) front motor and a 335 hp (250 kW; 340 PS) rear motor and has three locking differentials.

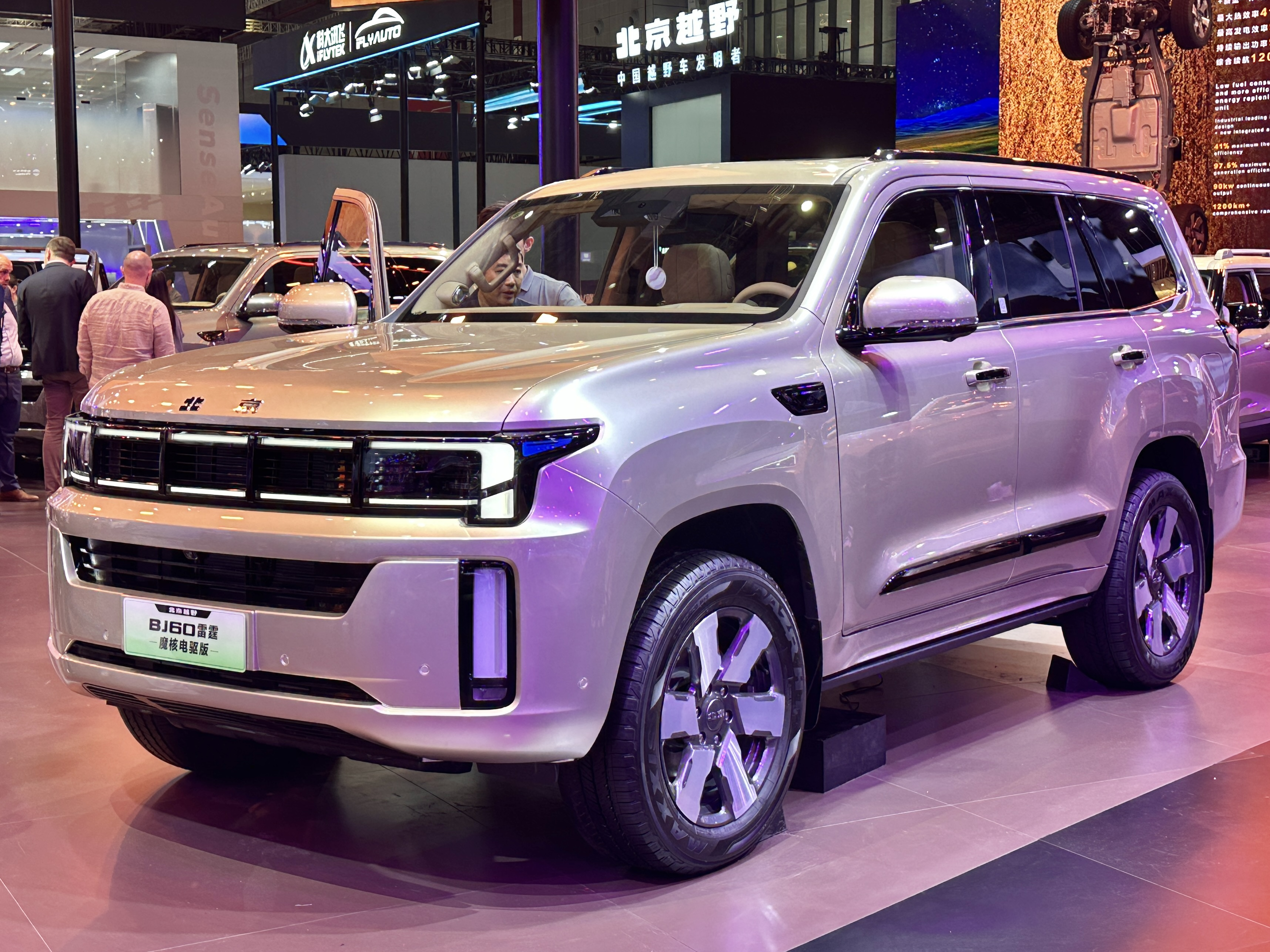
Beijing BJ60 Thunder

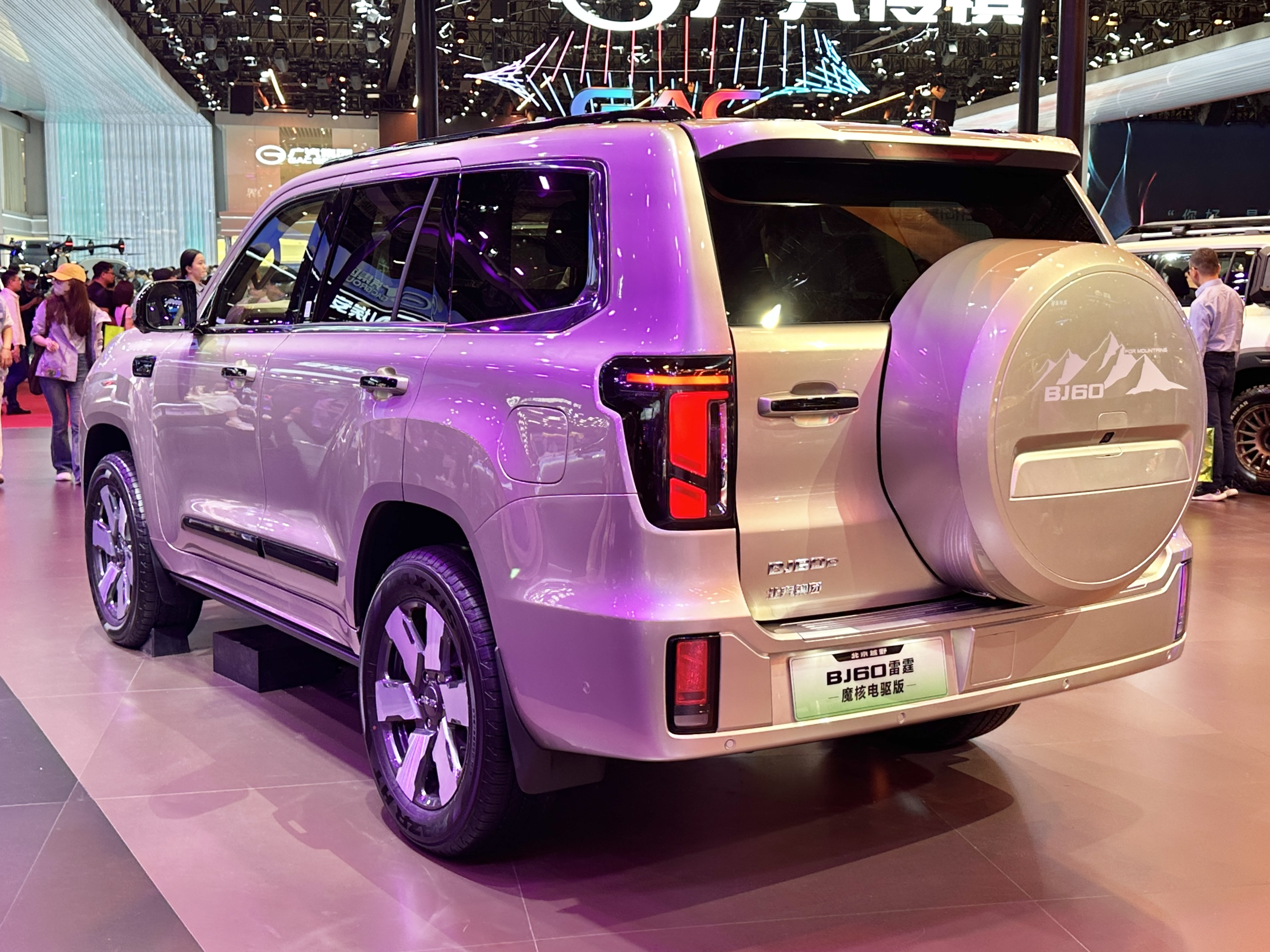
Rear view

== Beijing Titan 700 ==
A variant was renamed as the Beijing Titan 700 and was launched in July 2026. The Titan 700 is basically a BJ60 with Huawei Qiankun, revised interior and new color and trim.

The Titan 700 is a range-extender which uses a dual-motor all-wheel drive system. The range extender engine is a 1.5-liter turbocharged petrol inline-4 which outputs 185 hp (138 kW; 188 PS) (174 hp (130 kW; 176 PS) net power) and is not mechanically connected to the wheels. The front motor outputs 228 hp (170 kW; 231 PS) and 265 N⋅m (195 lb⋅ft) of torque, and the rear motor outputs 296 hp (221 kW; 300 PS) and 360 N⋅m (266 lb⋅ft) of torque, for a total of 525 hp (391 kW; 532 PS) and 625 N⋅m (461 lb⋅ft) of torque. Power is supplied by a 49.4 kWh NMC Xiaoyao battery supplied by CATL which provides a WLTP electric range of 165 km (103 mi) and can recharge from 30–80% in 20 minutes. Combined range with the 82-liter (21.7 U.S. gal) petrol tank is 1,340 km (833 mi) on the CLTC cycle.

Specifications
Battery		Power	Torque	Electric range		Top speed	Kerb weight
Type	Weight	Power	Torque	WLTP	CLTC	Top speed	Kerb weight
49.4 kWh Xiaoyao NMC CATL	310 kg (683 lb)	525 hp (391 kW; 532 PS)	625 N⋅m (461 lb⋅ft)	165 km (103 mi)	220 km (137 mi)	180 km/h (112 mph)	2,850 kg (6,283 lb)

== Sales ==
After its launch on 25 August 2026 at the 2026 Chengdu Auto Show, the Titan 700 received 6,859 pre-orders within 48 hours.

Year	China		
Year	BJ60	EREV	Total
2023	7,761	—	7,761
2024	4,682	1,627	6,309
2025	1,230	1,765	2,995
