= Huansu S5 =

Chinese compact crossover SUV

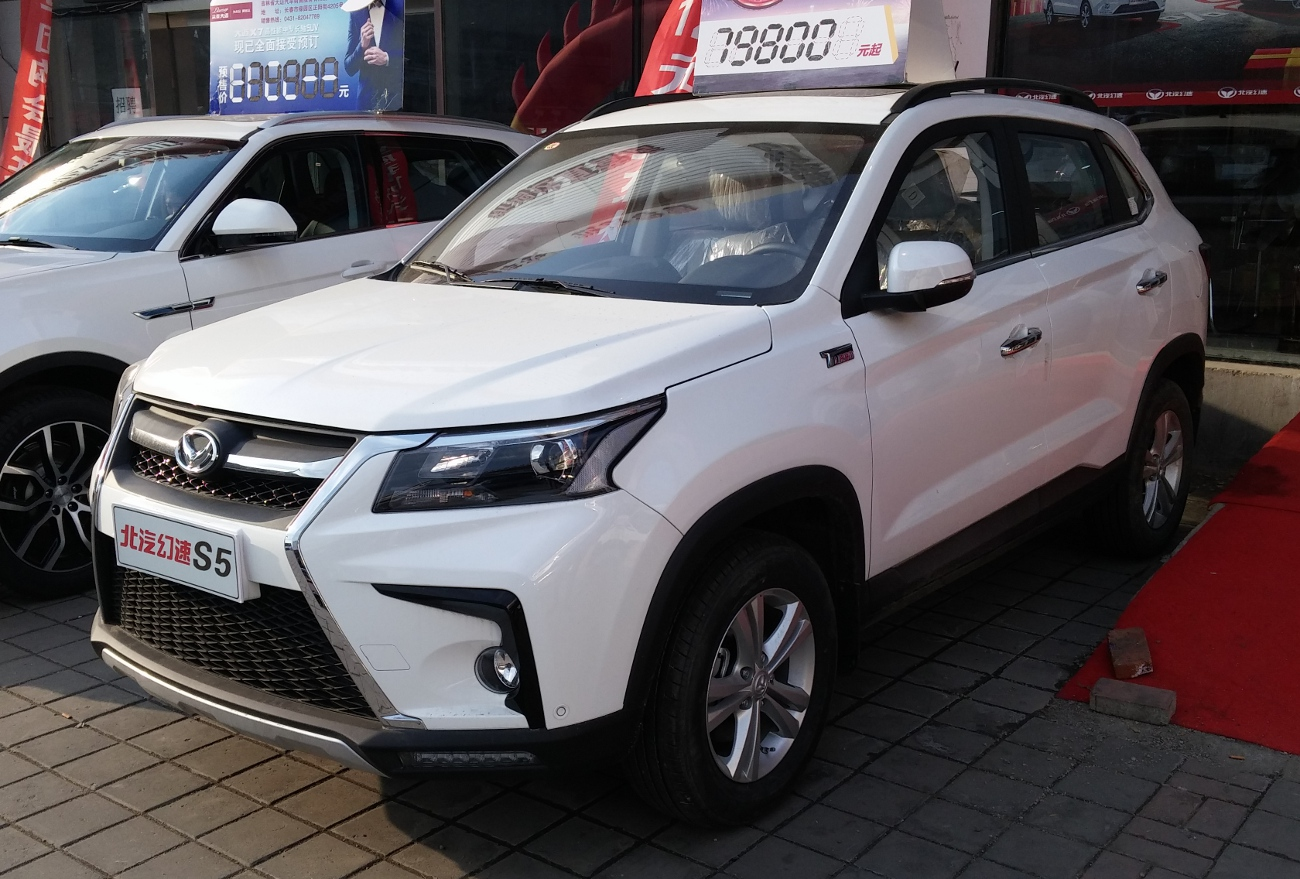

Overview
- Manufacturer: Huansu-BAIC Group
- Production: 2016–2019
- Model years: 2017–2019

Body and chassis
- Class: Compact crossover SUV
- Body style: 5-door SUV
- Layout: FF
- Related: Senova X55

Powertrain
- Engine: 1.3 L 'F13B' I4 turbo
- Transmission: 5-speed manual; CVT

Dimensions
- Wheelbase: 2,700 mm (106.3 in)
- Length: 4,460 mm (175.6 in)
- Width: 1,820 mm (71.7 in)
- Height: 1,685 mm (66.3 in)
- Curb weight: 1,435–1,465 kg (3,164–3,230 lb)

The Huansu S5 is a compact crossover SUV produced by Huansu, a sub-brand of BAIC Motor and Yinxiang Group.

== Overview ==
The Huansu S5 is manufactured by Beiqi Yinxiang Automobile. Based on the same platform as the Senova X55, the Huansu S5 is powered by a newly developed, codenamed F13B 1.3 liter turbocharged engine with 99 kW (133 hp) and 185 N⋅m (136 lb⋅ft) mated to a five-speed manual transmission or a CVT. The same engine was later shared with the Bisu T3 and was produced by a Chongqing company called Kaite Engine. The Huansu S5 was officially launched in March 2017, with prices ranging from 69,800 yuan to 79,800 yuan at launch, and later from 59,800 yuan to 85,800 yuan.

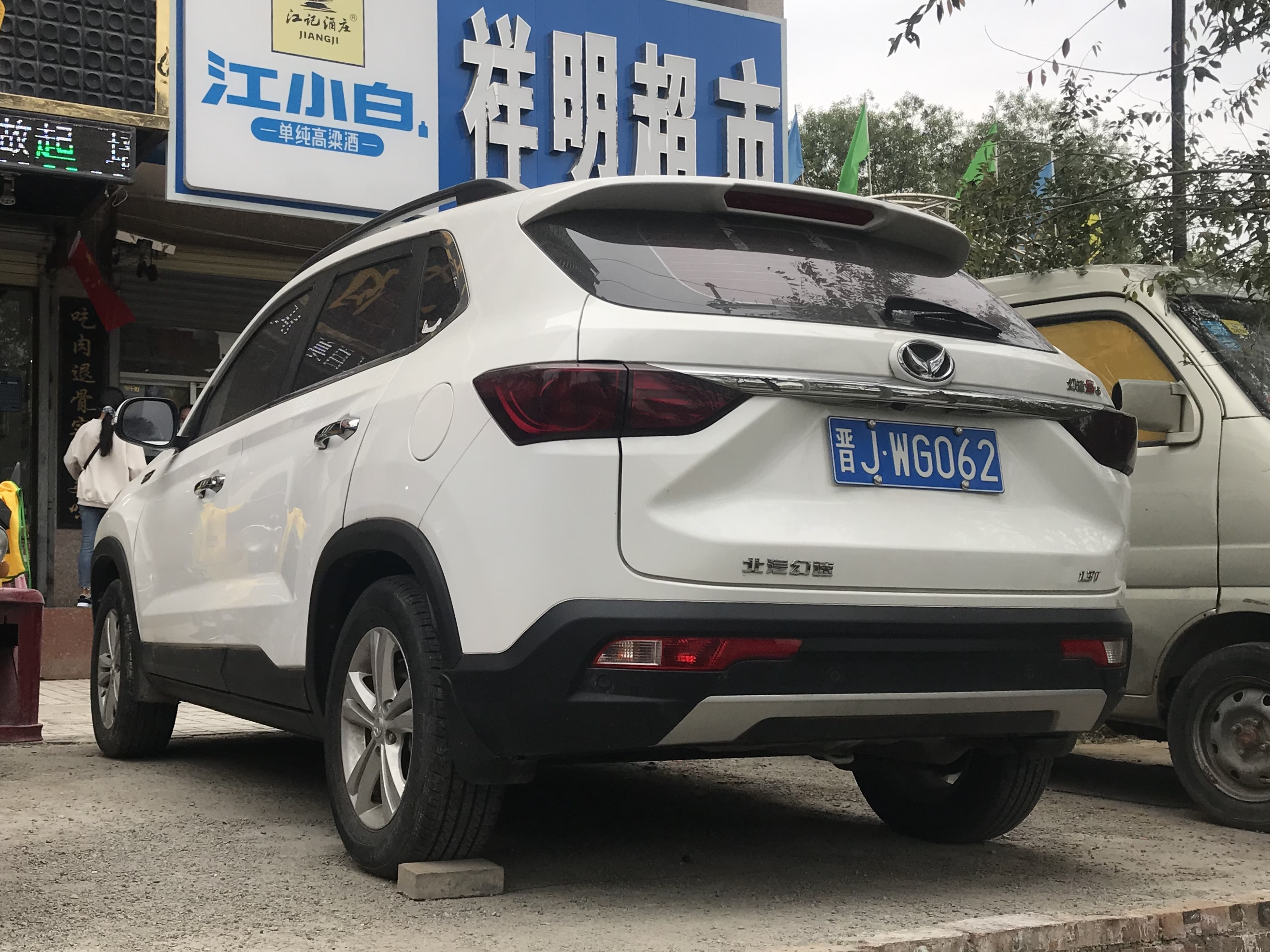
Huansu S5 rear
