= Beijing X5 =

Compact crossover SUV

Senova X55/Zhixing/Beijing X5
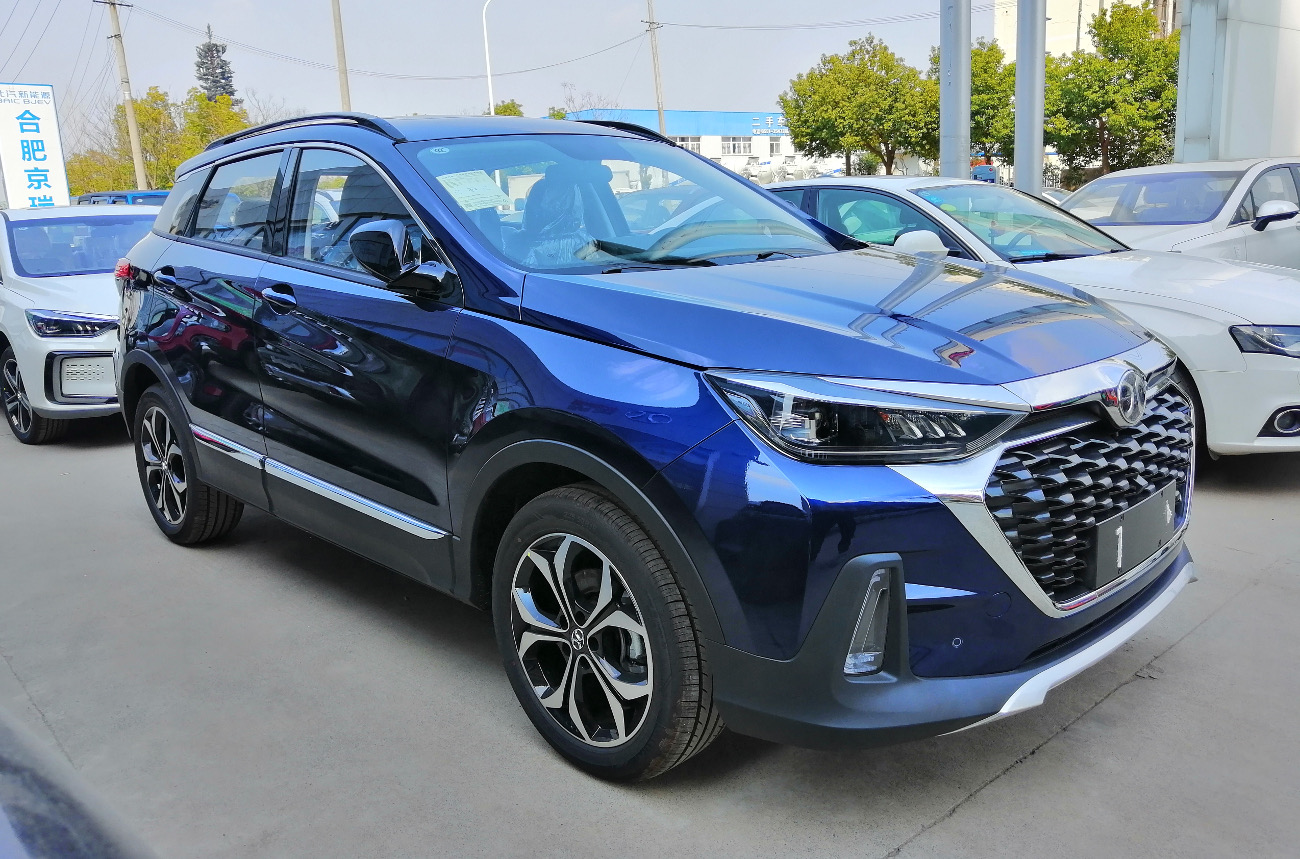
- Senova X55 (Zhixing)

Overview
- Manufacturer: Beijing (BAIC)
- Production: 2015–2025
- Model years: 2016–2026

Body and chassis
- Class: Compact SUV (C)
- Body style: 5-door crossover SUV
- Layout: Front-engine, front-wheel-drive

The Beijing X5 or previously the Senova X55 is a compact SUV positioned under the Senova X65 compact CUV produced by BAIC under the Senova (Shenbao 绅宝) and later the Beijing brand.

== First generation (2015) ==
First generation
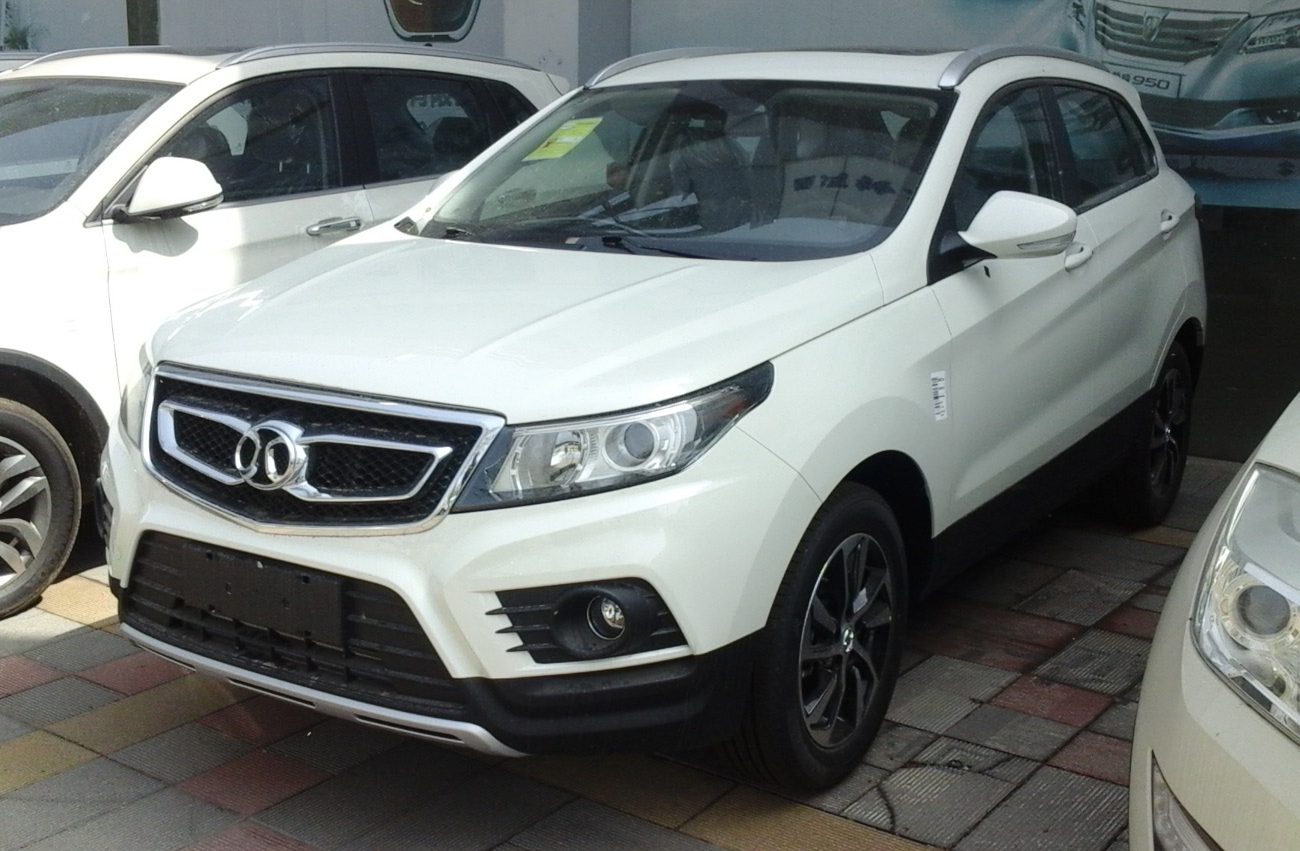

Overview
- Production: 2015–2018
- Model years: 2016–2019
- Assembly: China
- Designer: Mike Robinson

Body and chassis
- Related: Huansu S5

Powertrain
- Engine: Petrol: 1.5 L A151 I4; 1.5 L 4A91 I4 turbo
- Transmission: 5-speed manual; 6-speed manual; CVT

Dimensions
- Wheelbase: 2,650 mm (104 in)
- Length: 4,405 mm (173 in)
- Width: 1,809 mm (71 in)
- Height: 1,685 mm (66 in)

Originally previewed by the Beijing Auto C51X SUV concept, the production version of the first generation Senova X55 debuted during the 2015 Shanghai Auto Show, and was launched on to the China car market by the end of 2015.

The Senova X55 is powered by two Mitsubishi-sourced, four-cylinder petrol engines. The engines offered are a 1.5-litre engine producing 113 PS (83 kW; 111 bhp) and 147 N⋅m (108 lb⋅ft) mated to a 5-speed manual gearbox and a 1.5-litre turbo engine producing 150 PS (110 kW; 148 bhp) mated to a six-speed manual gearbox or a CVT automatic gearbox. Prices starts from 76,800 yuan to 119,800 yuan.

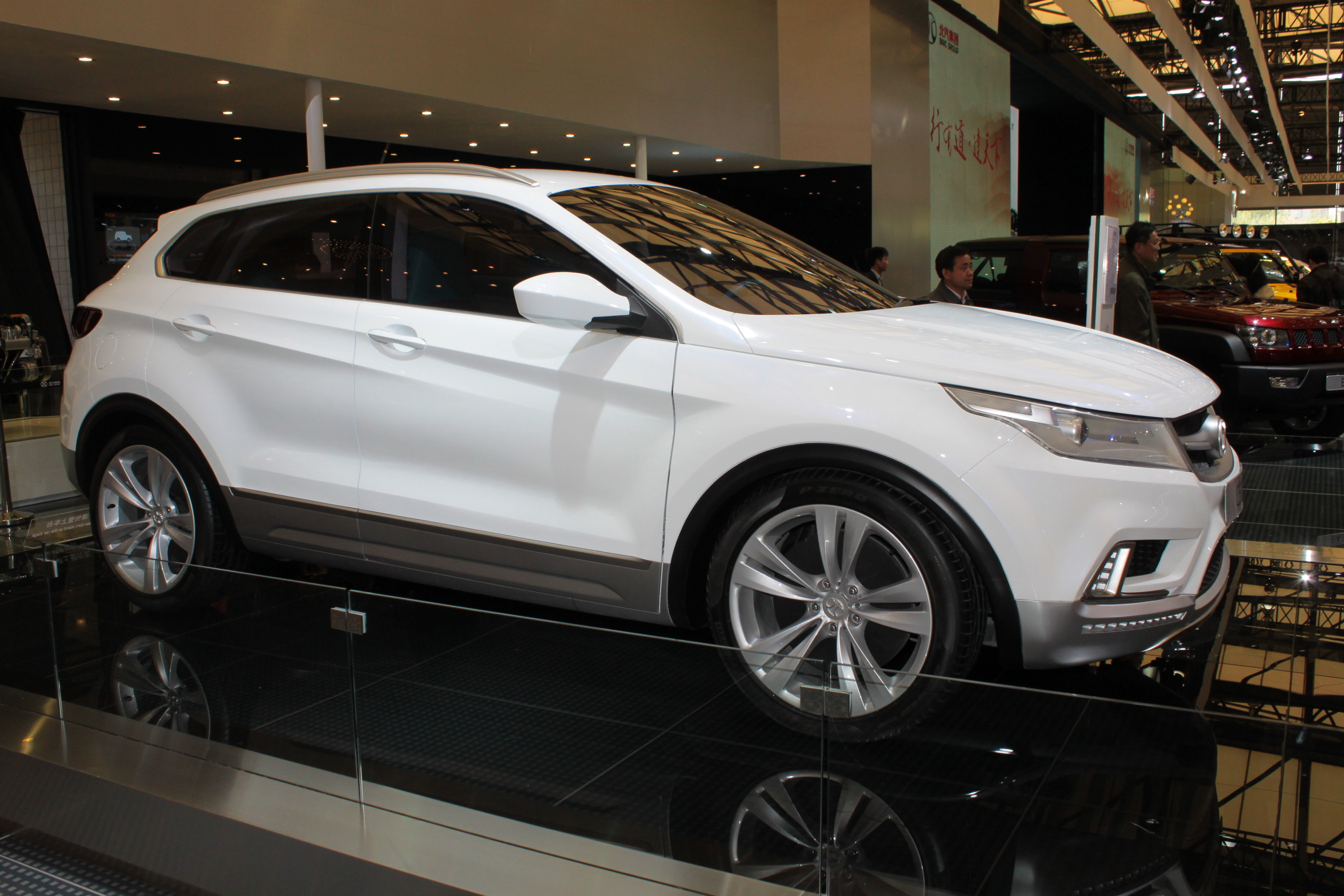
BAIC C51X Concept that previewed the first generation X55

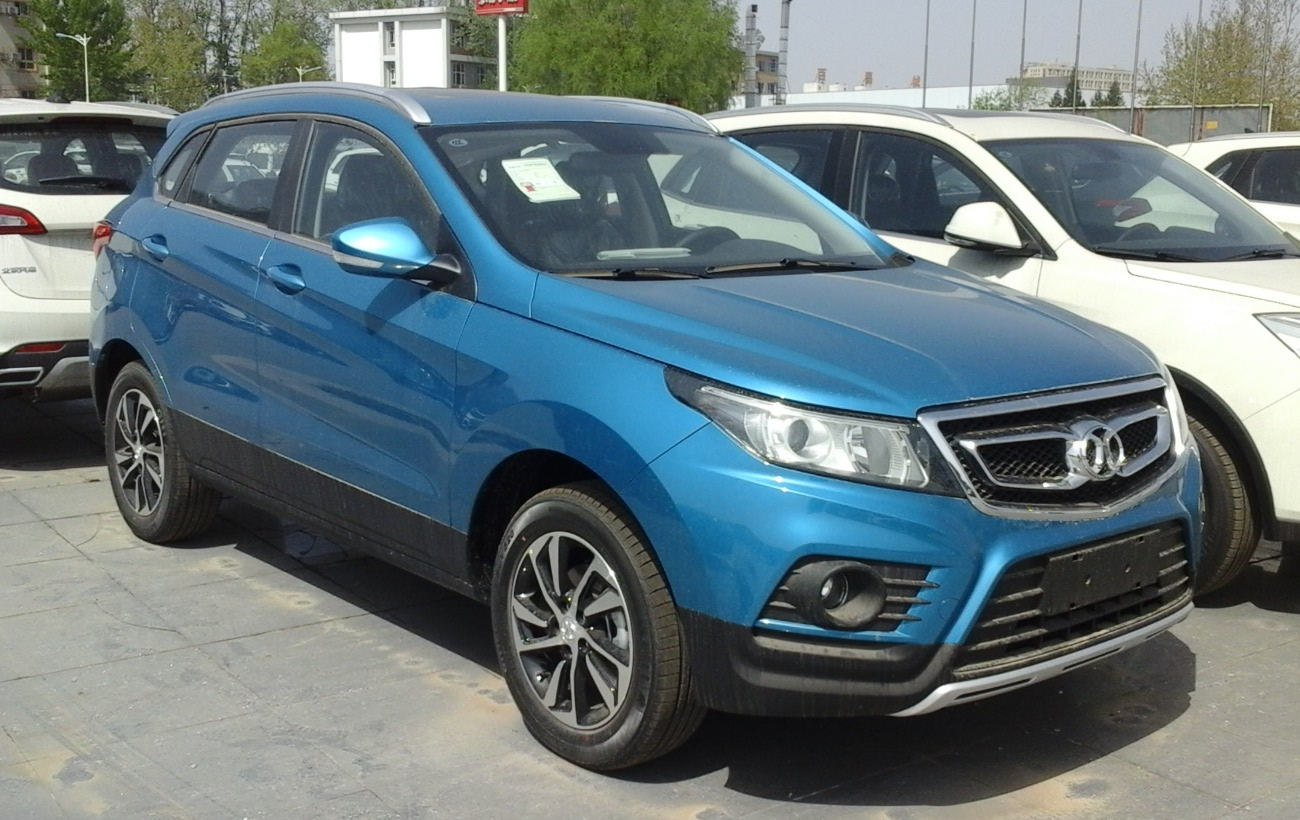
Senova X55 front

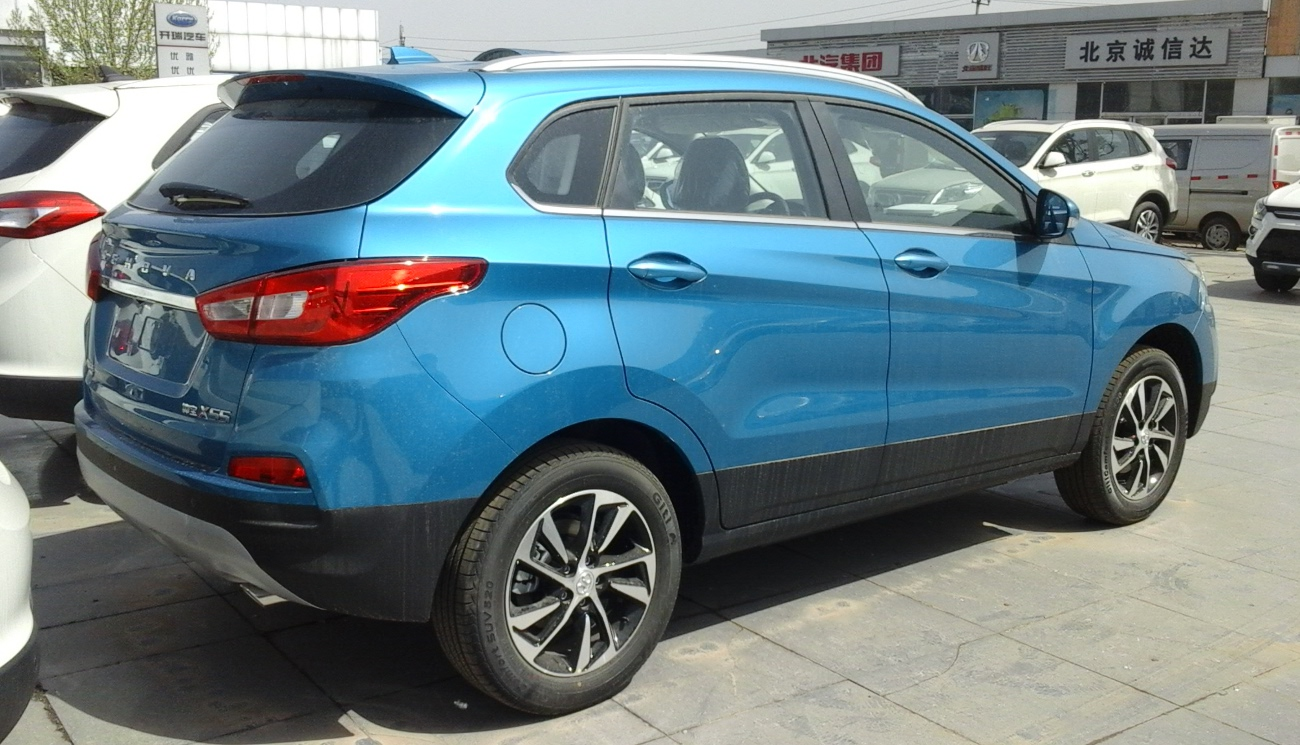
Senova X55 rear

== Second generation (2017) ==
Second generation
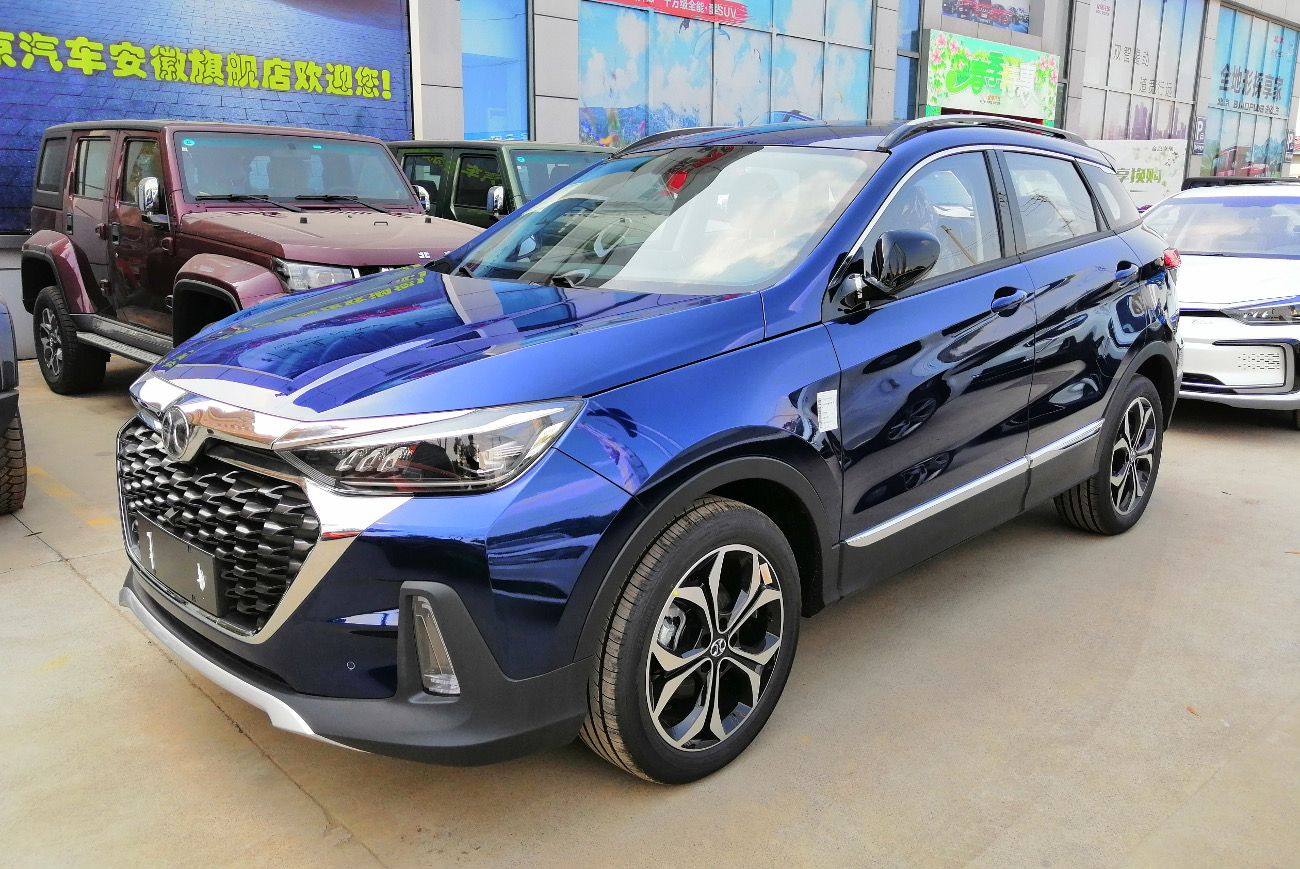

Overview
- Also called: Senova X55 (2017–2020); Senova Zhixing
- Production: 2017–2025
- Model years: 2018–2026
- Assembly: China

Powertrain
- Engine: Petrol: 1.5 L 4A91 I4 turbo
- Transmission: 6 speed manual; CVT

Dimensions
- Wheelbase: 2,665 mm (105 in)
- Length: 4,480 mm (176 in)
- Width: 1,809 mm (71 in)
- Height: 1,680 mm (66 in)

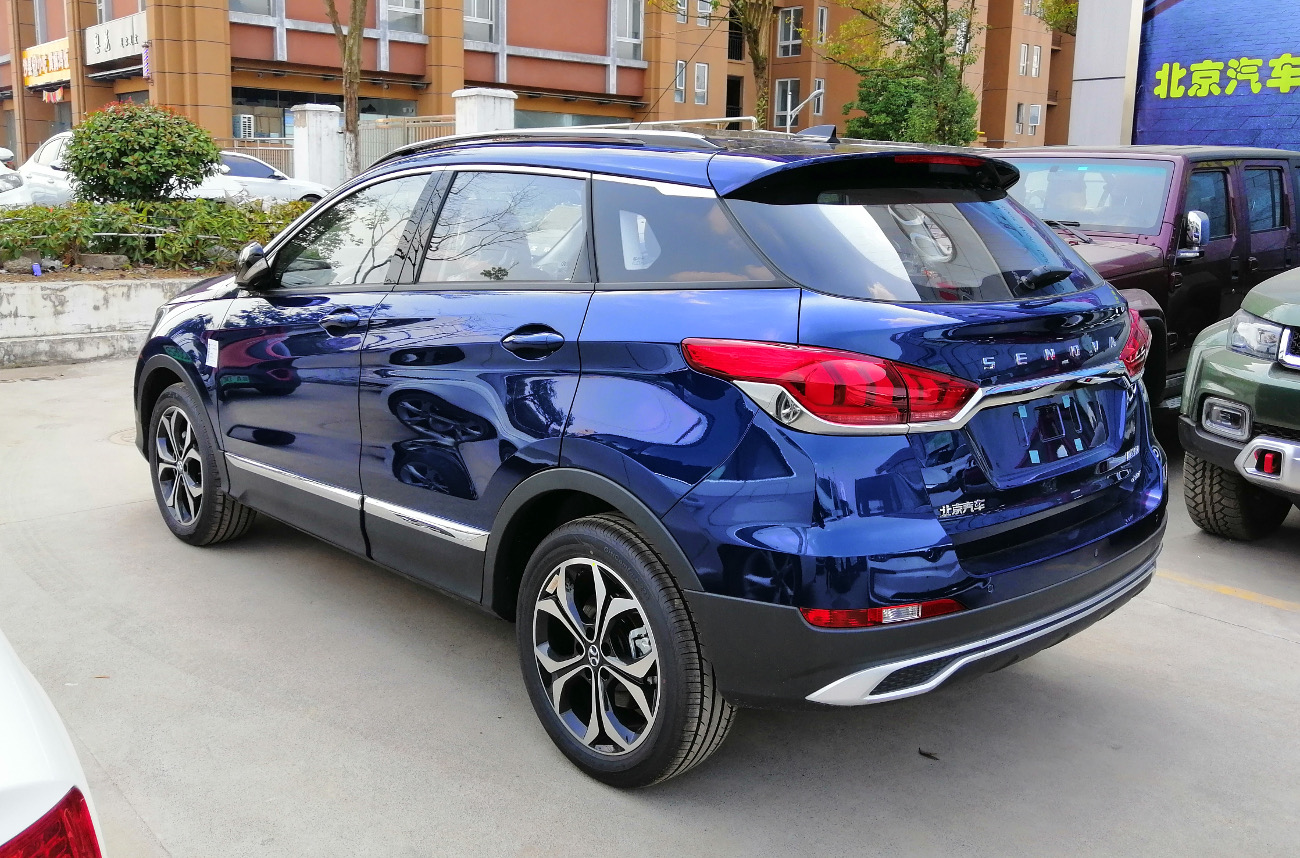
Senova X55 II (Zhixing) rear

The second generation Beijing Auto Senova X55 was unveiled on the 2017 Shanghai Auto Show in April 2017, with the market launch in July 2018.

Unveiled in October 2018 with the Chinese name "Zhixing" (智行), the second generation Senova X55 also features the new "Offspace" design language which later becomes the design of Beijing branded vehicles.

The second generation Senova X55 is equipped with the same 1.5-litre turbo engine used in the first generation Senova X55, producing 110 kW (148 hp; 150 PS) at 6,000 rpm and 210 N⋅m (155 lb⋅ft; 21 kg⋅m) at 2,000−4,500 rpm.

The front suspension of the X55 is MacPherson-type independent suspension while the rear suspension is multi-link suspension.

As of 2020, the second generation model was later renamed to Beijing X5 after the launch of the revamped Beijing brand.

=== BJEV EX5 ===
The BJEV EX5 is a plug-in electric vehicle. It is the "NEV" version of the Senova X55 for the Chinese market which has a number of special incentives for NEVs. The BJEV EX5 was launched in the market January 2019.

The BJEV EC5 is equipped with a 218 PS (160 kW; 215 bhp) electric motor and a 61.8 kWh (222 MJ) battery. The NEDC tested range is 415 km (258 mi).

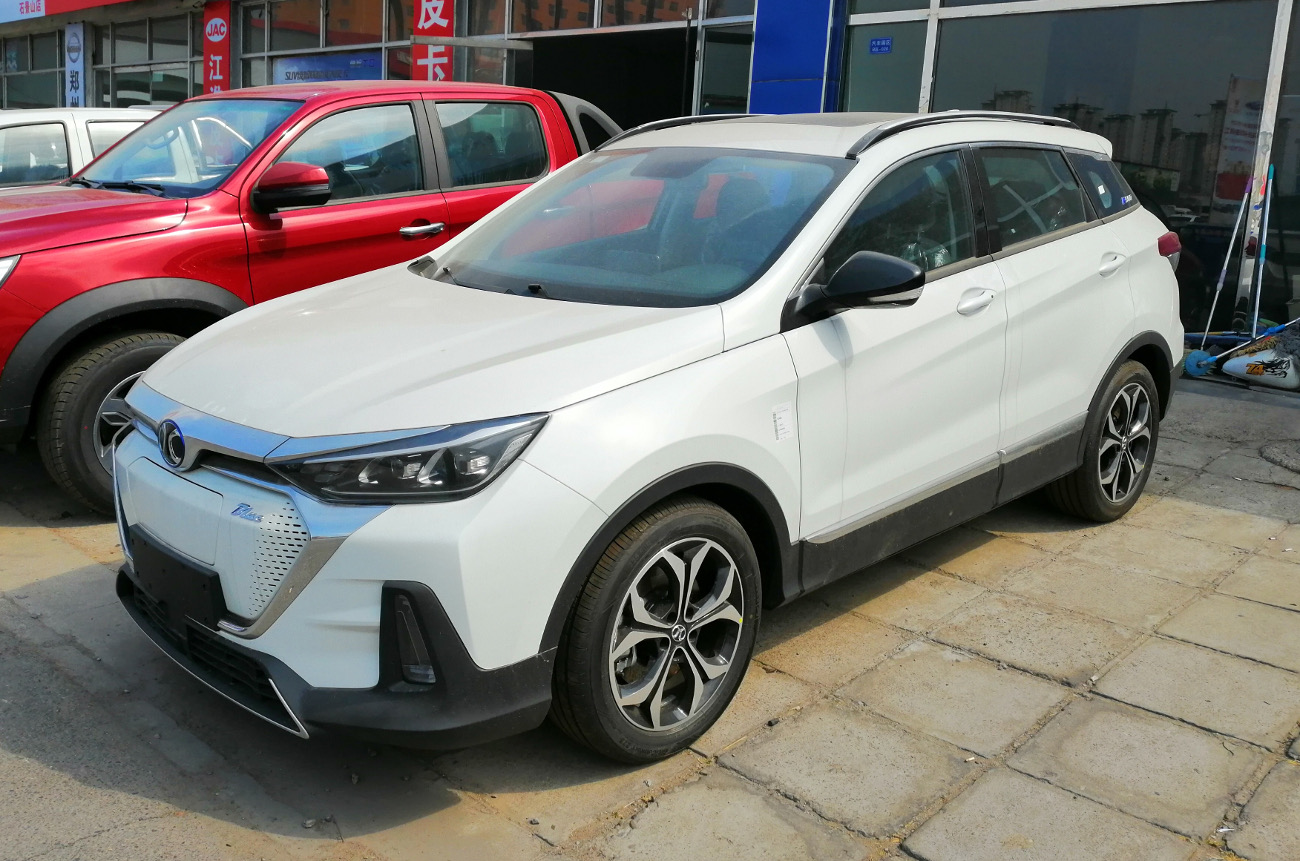

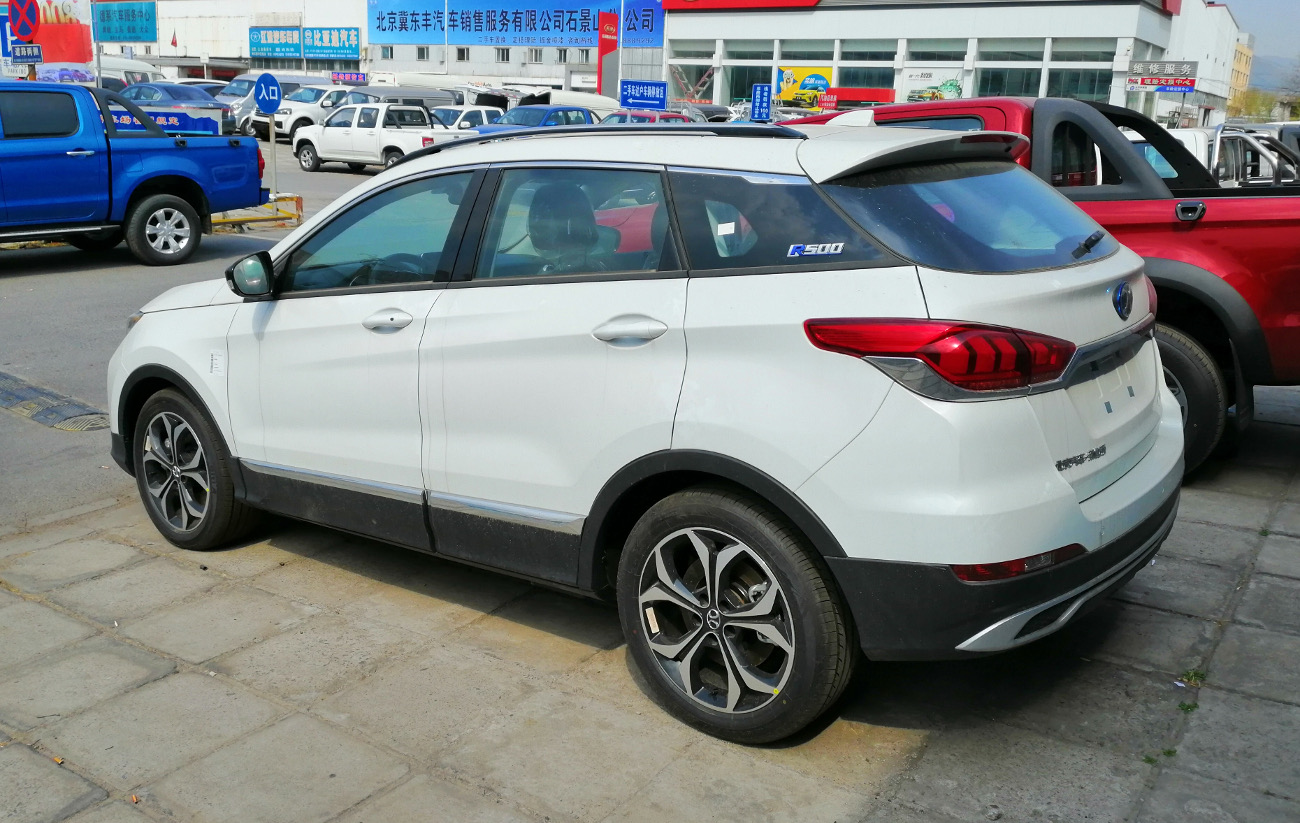
