= BAIC Motor =

Chinese car manufacturer

BAIC Motor Corporation Limited
- Formerly: Senova
- Type: Public
Traded as
unlisted	(A share)
SEHK: 1958	(H share)
- ISIN: CNE100001TJ4
- Industry: Automotive
- Founded: 2010; 16 years ago
- Headquarters: Beijing, China
- Area served: Worldwide
- Key people: Zhang Xiyong (GM); Heyi Xu (chairman & Secretary of the Party Committee)
- Products: Passenger cars, electric vehicles (EVs)
- Revenue: ▲US$26,850,148 (2023)
- Net income: 300,518 (2023)
- Total assets: 23,438,925 (2023)
- Number of employees: 31,236 (2024)
- Parent: BAIC Group
Rating
unrated	(Moody's, May 2016)
- Website: baicmotor.com

BAIC Motor Corporation Limited
- Simplified Chinese: 北京汽车股份有限公司
- Traditional Chinese: 北京汽車股份有限公司
- Literal meaning: Beijing Motor Joint-stock Limited Corporation
Transcriptions
Standard Mandarin
- Hanyu Pinyin: Běijīng Qìchē Gǔfèn Yǒuxiàn Gōngsī

BAIC Motor
- Simplified Chinese: 北京汽车
- Traditional Chinese: 北京汽車
- Literal meaning: Beijing Motor
Transcriptions
Standard Mandarin
- Hanyu Pinyin: Běijīng Qìchē

BAIC Motor Corporation Limited is a Chinese automaker headquartered in Beijing. The H shares (foreigner share in offshore market) of the company were traded in the Hong Kong Stock Exchange. It was part of BAIC Group, itself a subsidiary of Beijing Municipal Government.

== History ==
BAIC Motor was incorporated in 2010 as a sub-holding company of BAIC Group. It became a listed company in December 2014.

The firm announced plans, in March 2015, to extend its partnership with Daimler AG by taking a 35 percent stake in Mercedes-Benz Leasing, a leasing company incorporated in China.

== Vehicles ==
Beijing is BAIC Motor's major brand, revived in 2020 after BAIC Group discontinued its Senova brand. All the former Senova vehicles were renamed to Beijing brand since then. The current Beijing models badged in English name "BEIJING".

=== Current models ===
- Beijing EU8 (2026–present), executive sedan
- Beijing U5 Plus (2014–present), compact sedan
- Beijing X3 (2013–present), subcompact SUV
- Beijing Mofang (2022–present), compact SUV
- Beijing X7 (2020–present), mid-size SUV
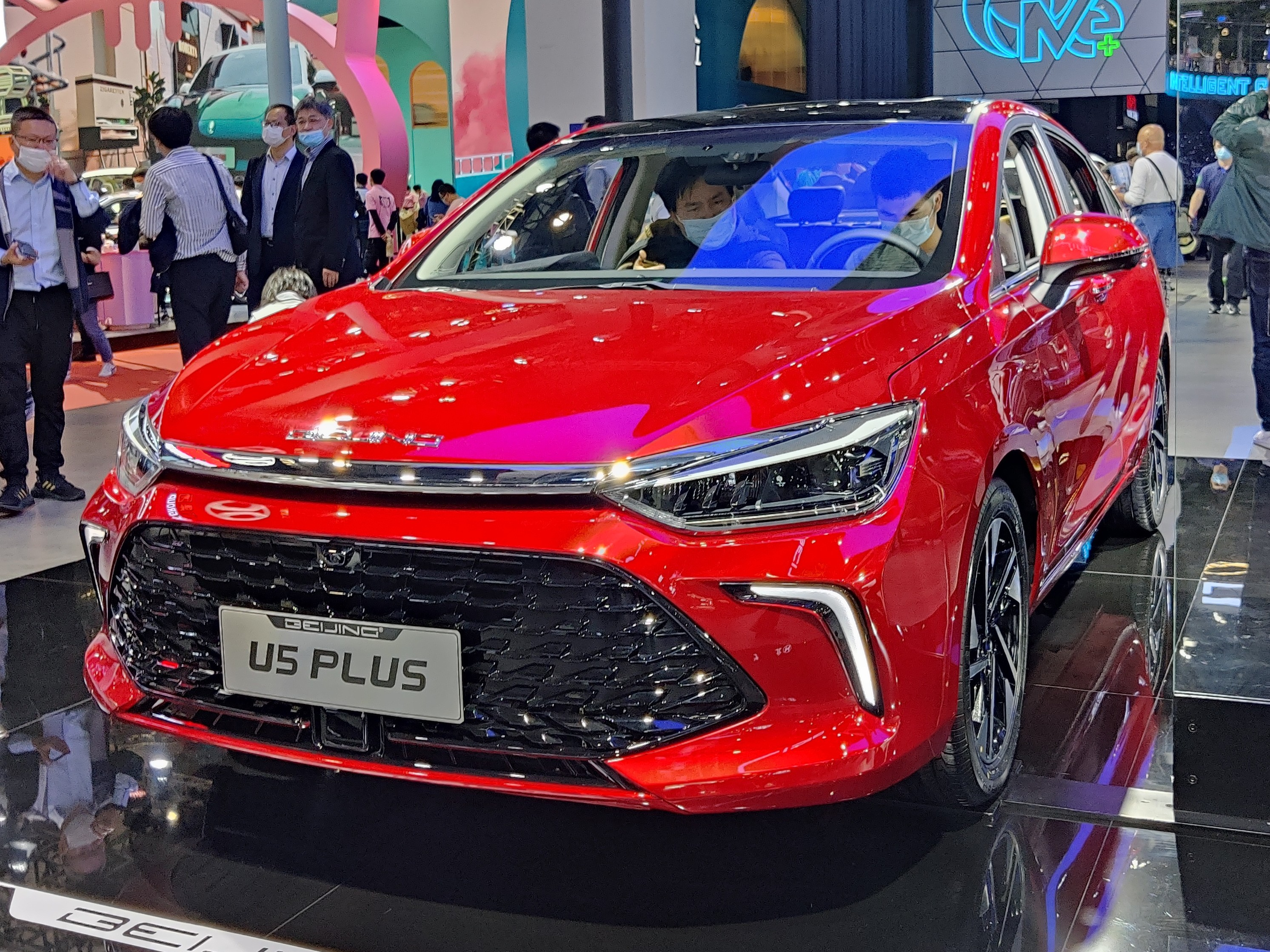
Beijing U5 Plus

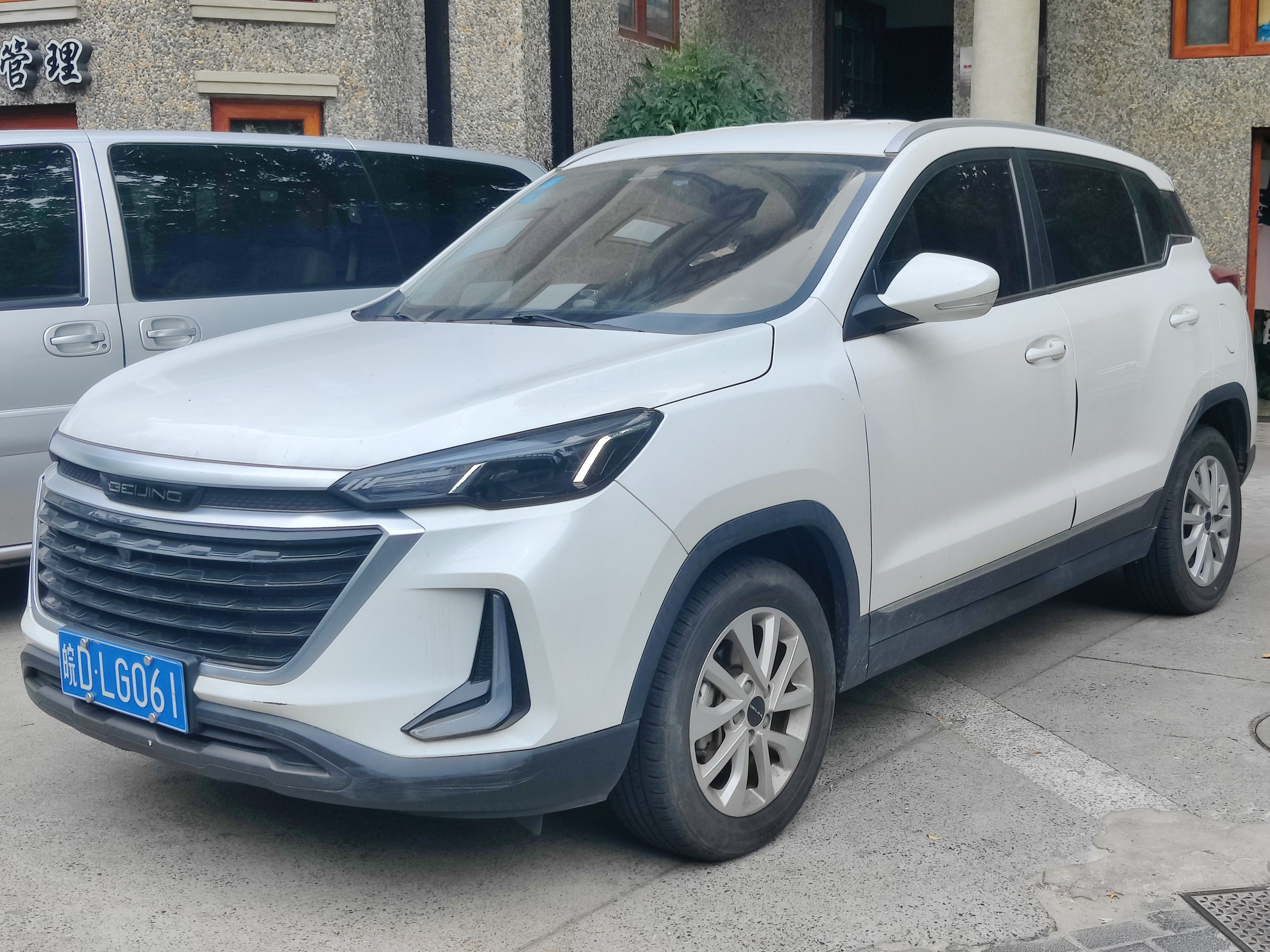
Beijing X3

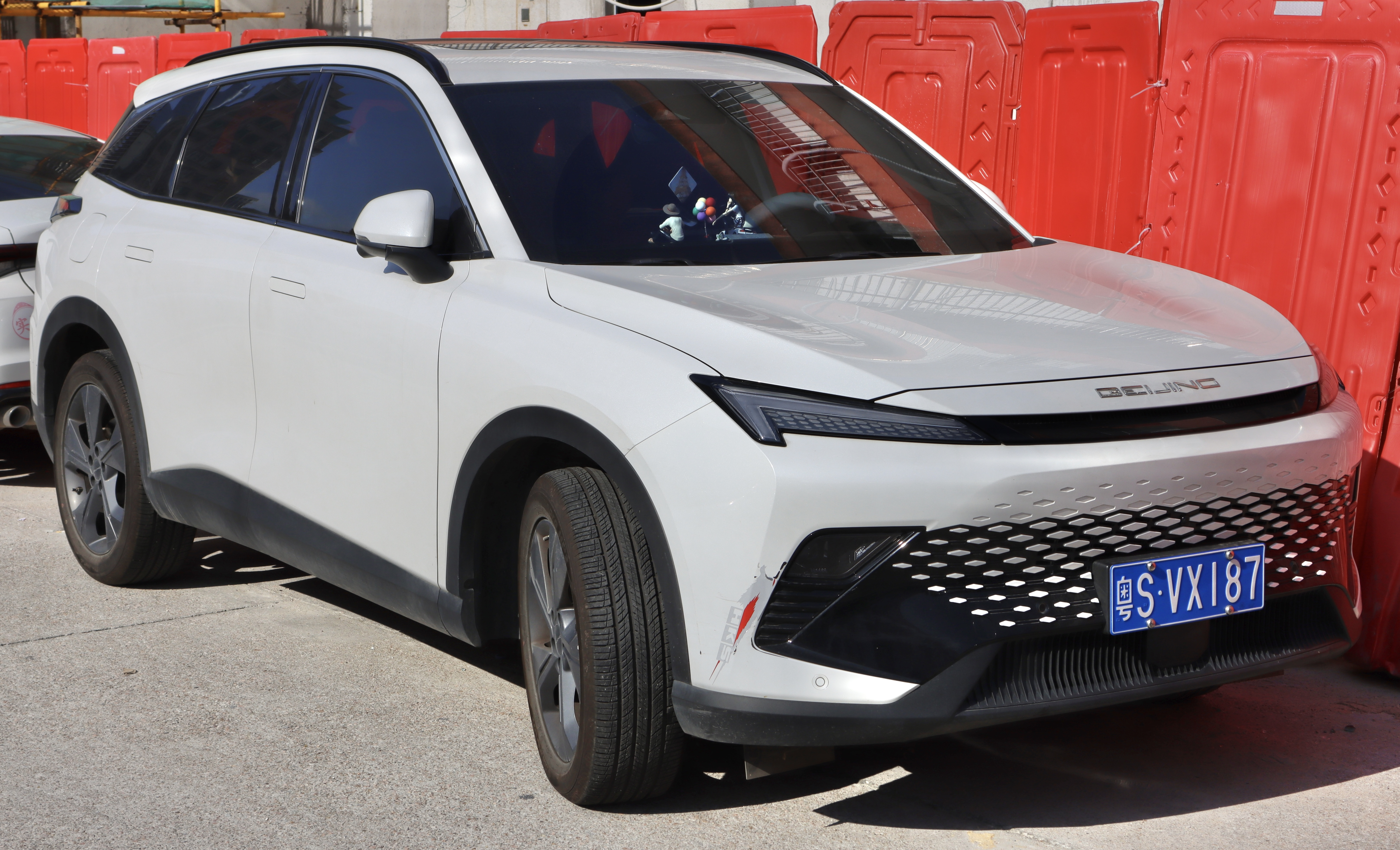
Beijing Mofang

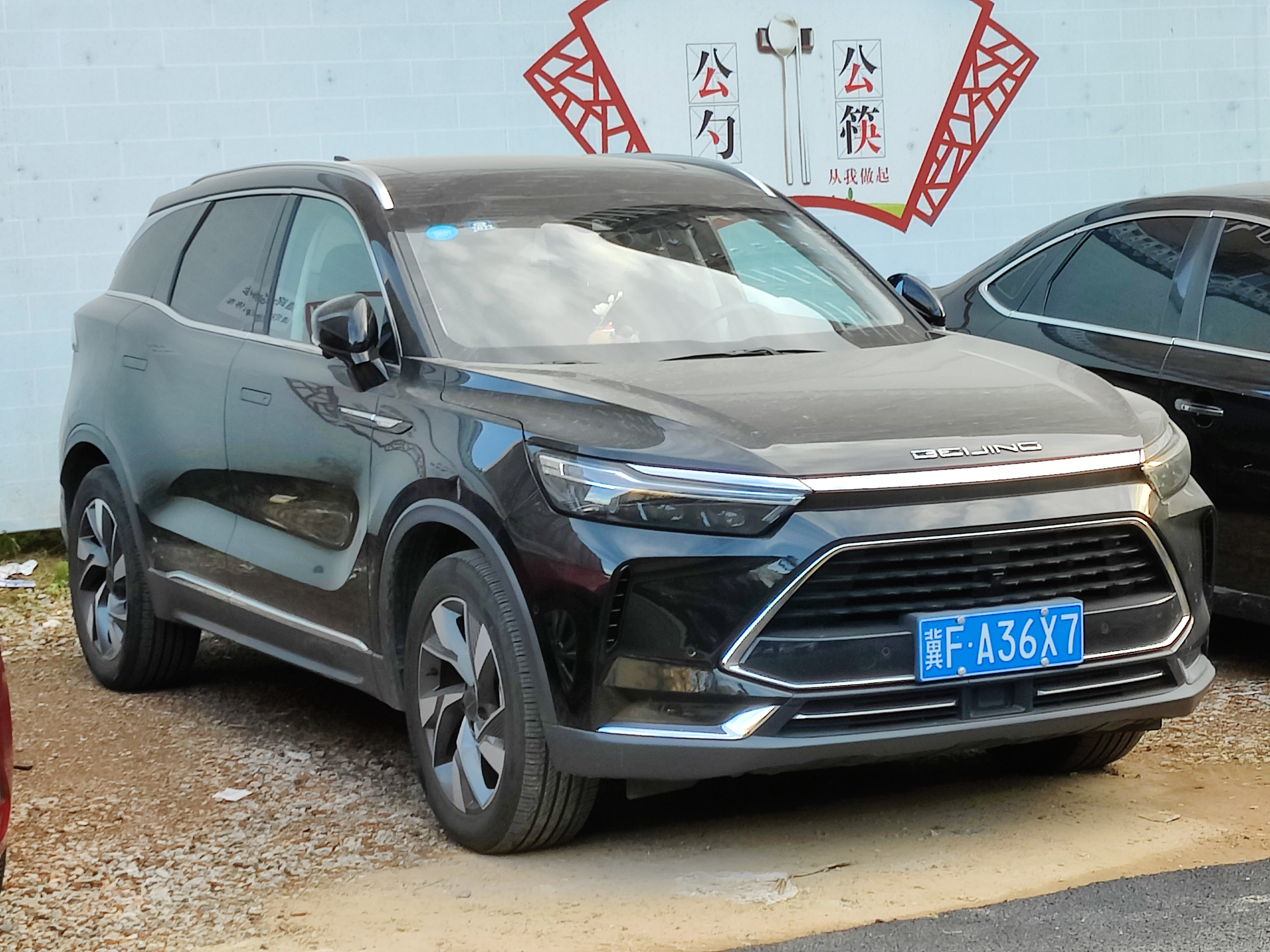
Beijing X7

=== Discontinued models ===
- Beijing U7 (2013–2025), mid-size sedan
- Beijing X5 (2015–2025), compact SUV
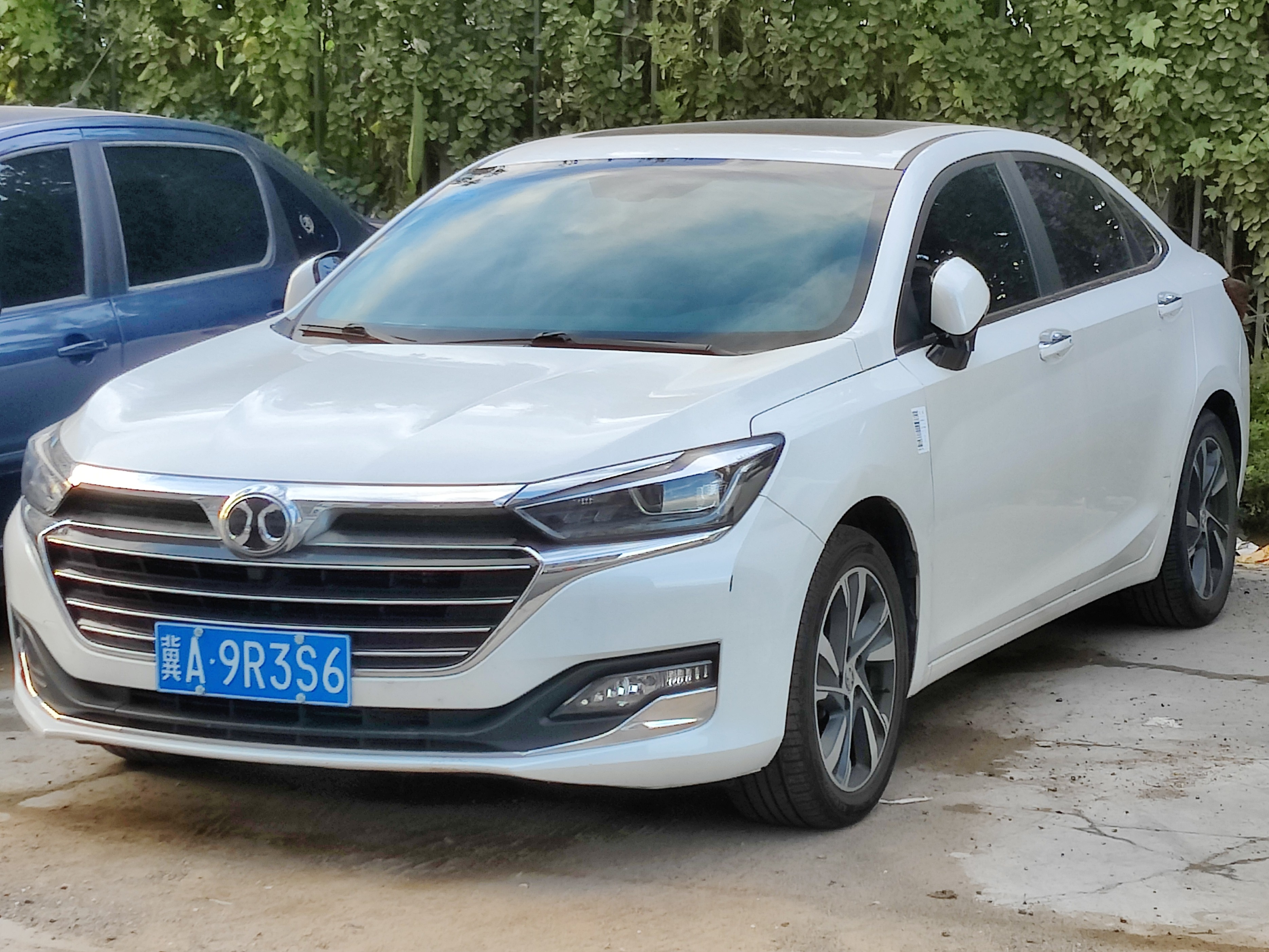
Beijing U7

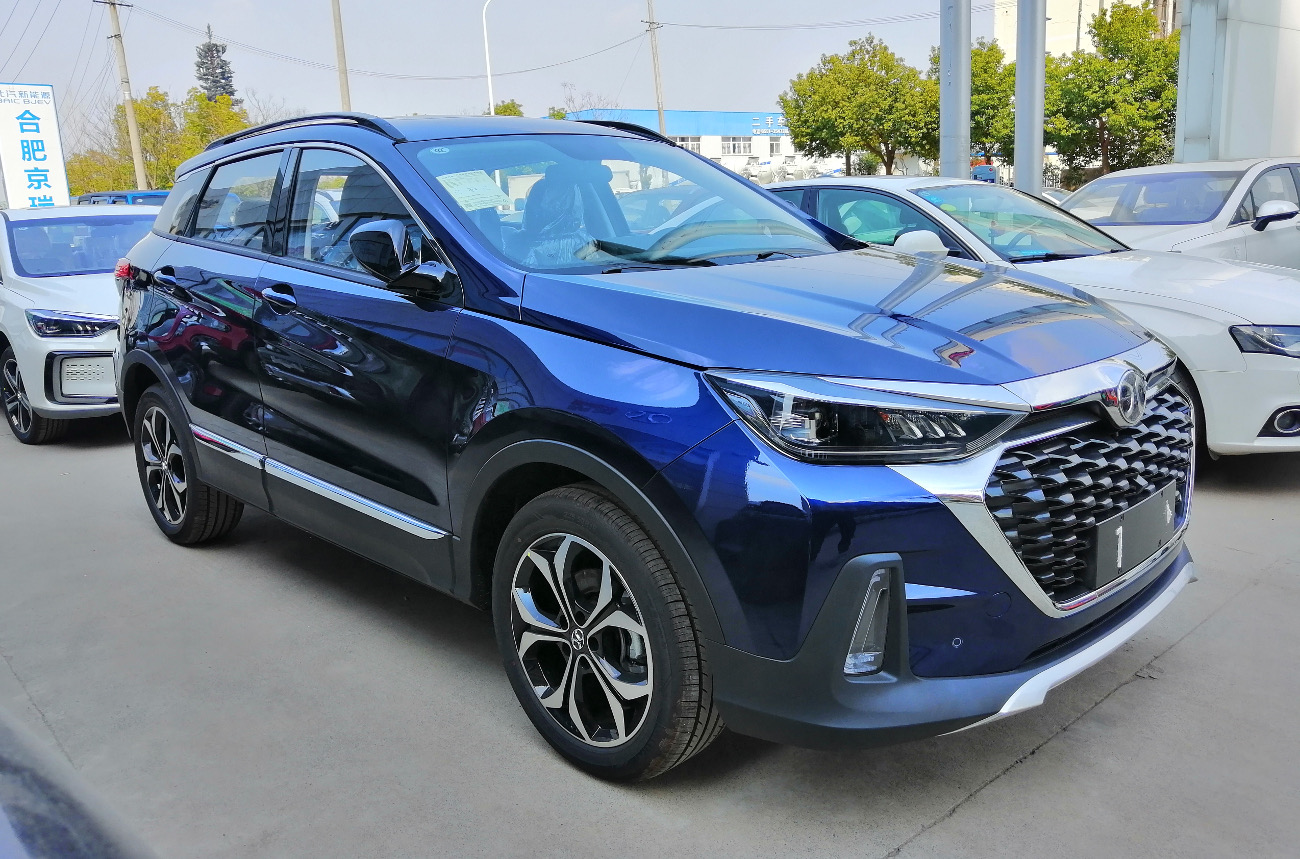
Beijing X5

== Joint ventures ==
=== Current joint ventures ===
==== Beijing Hyundai ====
Beijing Hyundai Motor Co., Ltd. is an automobile manufacturing company headquartered in Beijing, China, and is a 50:50 joint-venture between BAIC and Hyundai Motor Company. Established in 2002, it manufactures in Shunyi District, a satellite city of Beijing, producing Hyundai-branded automobiles for the Chinese market. New models designed for the Chinese market are due to appear.

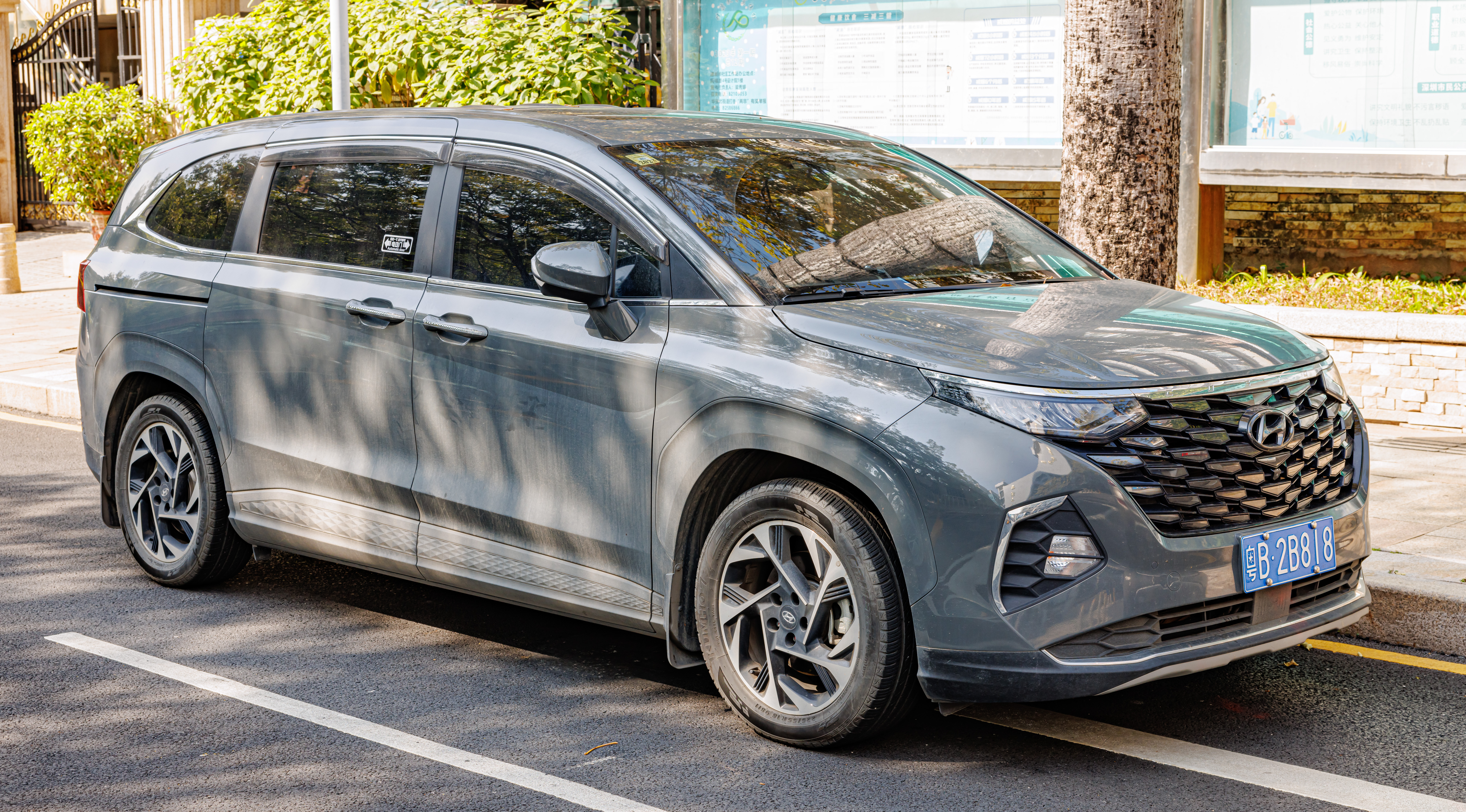
Beijing Hyundai Custo

==== Beijing Benz ====
As of 2010, Beijing Benz, a BAIC joint venture with German automaker Daimler AG, makes the Mercedes-Benz C-Class and E-Class models for sale in China and seeks to make more of the models it sells in China locally.

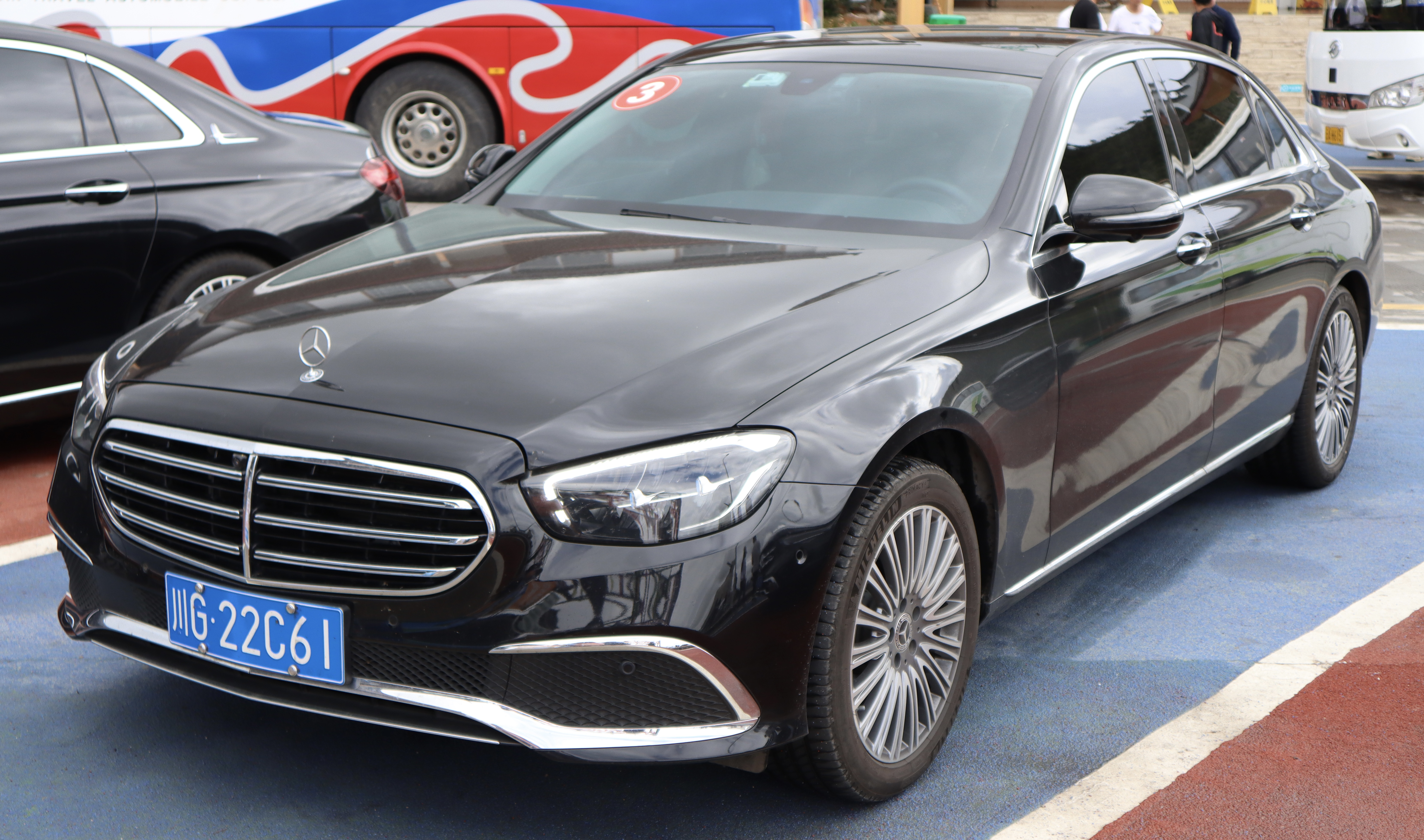
Beijing-Mercedes-Benz E300L

== Shareholders ==
As of 31 December 2016

Rank	Name	Chinese name	Percentage	Footnotes
1	BAIC Group	北汽集团	44.98%	State-owned enterprise, Beijing Municipal Government was controlling shareholder
2	Shougang "Shares"	首钢股份	13.54%	Shanghai-listed company, Beijing Municipal Government was indirect controlling shareholder
3	Daimler AG		9.55%	Frankfurt-listed company, shareholder of Beijing Benz
Sub-total			68.6%	
4	Shenzhen Benyuan Jinghong Equity Investment Fund	本源晶鸿基金	4.50%	A share owner; partially owned by BAIC Capital (of BAIC Group) as limited partner
5	Easy Smart Limited	易穎有限公司	3.67%	H share owner, Cayman Islands incorporated; subsidiary of China Aerospace Investment Holdings (CASC Group)
N/A	other H share owners		13.91%	
N/A	other A share owners		9.32%	
Total			100%	

== See also ==
- Automobile manufacturers and brands of China
- List of automobile manufacturers of China
