= List of BAIC Group vehicles =

This is a list of current and former automobiles produced by Chinese automaker BAIC Group (abbreviated as BAIC), under its brands Arcfox, Beijing and Beijing Off-road.

For Stelato, the brand in cooperation with Huawei under the Harmony Intelligent Mobility Alliance (HIMA), see List of HIMA vehicles.

== Current vehicles ==
=== Beijing ===
Image	Models	Chinese name	Introduction	Generation	Vehicle description
Sedans
	U5	北京U5	2014	2nd	Compact sedan
	EU8	北京EU8	2026	1st	Mid-size sedan, BEV
SUV
	X7	北京X7	2020	1st	Compact SUV

=== Beijing Off-road ===
Image	Models	Chinese name	Introduction	Generation	Vehicle description
SUV
	81VJ	北京越野81VJ	2026	1st	Mid-size SUV
	BJ30	北京越野BJ30	2016	2nd	Compact SUV
	BJ40	北京越野BJ40	2013	2nd	Compact SUV
	BJ60/Titan 700	北京越野BJ60/北汽泰钽700	2022	1st	Mid-size SUV
	Xingtan 5X	北汽星钽5X	2026	1st	Mid-size SUV, ICE/PHEV/BEV

=== Arcfox ===
Image	Models	Chinese name	Introduction	Generation	Vehicle description
Cars
	βS3	极狐贝塔S3	2026	1st	Mid-size sedan
	βT1	极狐贝塔T1	2025	1st	Compact hatchback
	αS5	极狐 阿尔法S5	2024	1st	Mid-size sedan
	αS6	极狐 阿尔法S6	2021	1st	Full-size sedan, previously Arcfox α-S
SUV
	αT5	极狐 阿尔法T5	2023	1st	Mid-size SUV
	αT6	极狐 阿尔法T6	2020	1st	Mid-size SUV, previously Arcfox α-T
	αT7	极狐 阿尔法T7	2026	1st	Mid-size SUV
MPV
	Kaola	极狐考拉	2023	1st	Compact MPV
	Wendao V9	极狐问道V9	2026	1st	Full-size MPV

== Discontinued vehicles ==
=== Beijing ===
Image	Models	Chinese name	Introduction	Discontinued	Generation	Vehicle description
Cars
	EU5	北京EU5	2018	2025	1st	Compact sedan, BEV
	U7	北京U7	2020	2025	1s	Mid-size sedan
	EU7	北京EU7	2019	2025	1st	Mid-size sedan, BEV
SUV
	EX3	北京EX3	2018	2022	1st	Subcompact SUV
	EX5	北京EX5	2019	2024	1st	Compact SUV, PHEV
	Mofang	北京魔方	2022	2025	1st	Compact SUV
	X3	北京X3	2020	2024	1st	Subcompact SUV
	X5	北京X5	2020	2025	1st	Compact SUV

=== BJEV ===
Image	Models	Chinese name	Introduction	Discontinued	Generation	Vehicle description
Cars
	EV	北汽新能源EV	2013	2017	1st	Subcompact car, EV variant of Senova D20
	EH	北汽新能源EH	2016	2019	1st	Mid-size car, EV variant of Senova D70
	EU	北汽新能源EU	2016	2019	1st	Compact car, EV variant of Senova D50
	EC3/EC	北汽新能源EC3/EC	2016	2020	1st	Subcompact car
SUV
	EC5/EX	北汽新能源EC5/EX	2016	2019	1st	Subcompact SUV, EV variant of Senova X25

=== Beijing Off-road ===
Image	Models	Chinese name	Introduction	Discontinued	Generation	Vehicle description
SUV
	BJ20	北京BJ20	2015	2020	1st	Compact SUV
	BJ80	北京BJ80	2016	2025	1st	Mid-size SUV
	BJ90	北京BJ90	2016	2023	1st	Full-size SUV
Pickup
	F40	北京F40	2019	2023	1st	Compact pickup, variant of BJ40

=== Senova ===
Image	Models	Chinese name	Introduction	Discontinued	Generation	Vehicle description
Sedans
	D20	绅宝D20	2012	2020	1st	Subcompact car
	D50	绅宝D50	2013	2020	2nd	Subcompact car
	D60/CC	绅宝D60	2013	2017	1st	Mid-size sedan
	D70	绅宝D70	2013	2020	2nd	Mid-size sedan
	D80	绅宝D80	2015	2017	1st	Mid-size sedan
SUV
	X25	绅宝X25	2014	2017	1st	Subcompact SUV
	X35	绅宝X35	2016	2018	1st	Subcompact SUV
	X55	绅宝X55	2015	2018	1st	Compact SUV
	X65	绅宝X65	2014	2017	1st	Compact SUV
	Zhixing	绅宝智行	2017	2020	1st	Compact SUV

=== Arcfox ===
Image	Models	Chinese name	Introduction	Discontinued	Generation	Vehicle description
Cars
	Lite	极狐Lite	2017	2020	1st	Microcar
