= Beijing X3 =

Subcompact crossover SUV

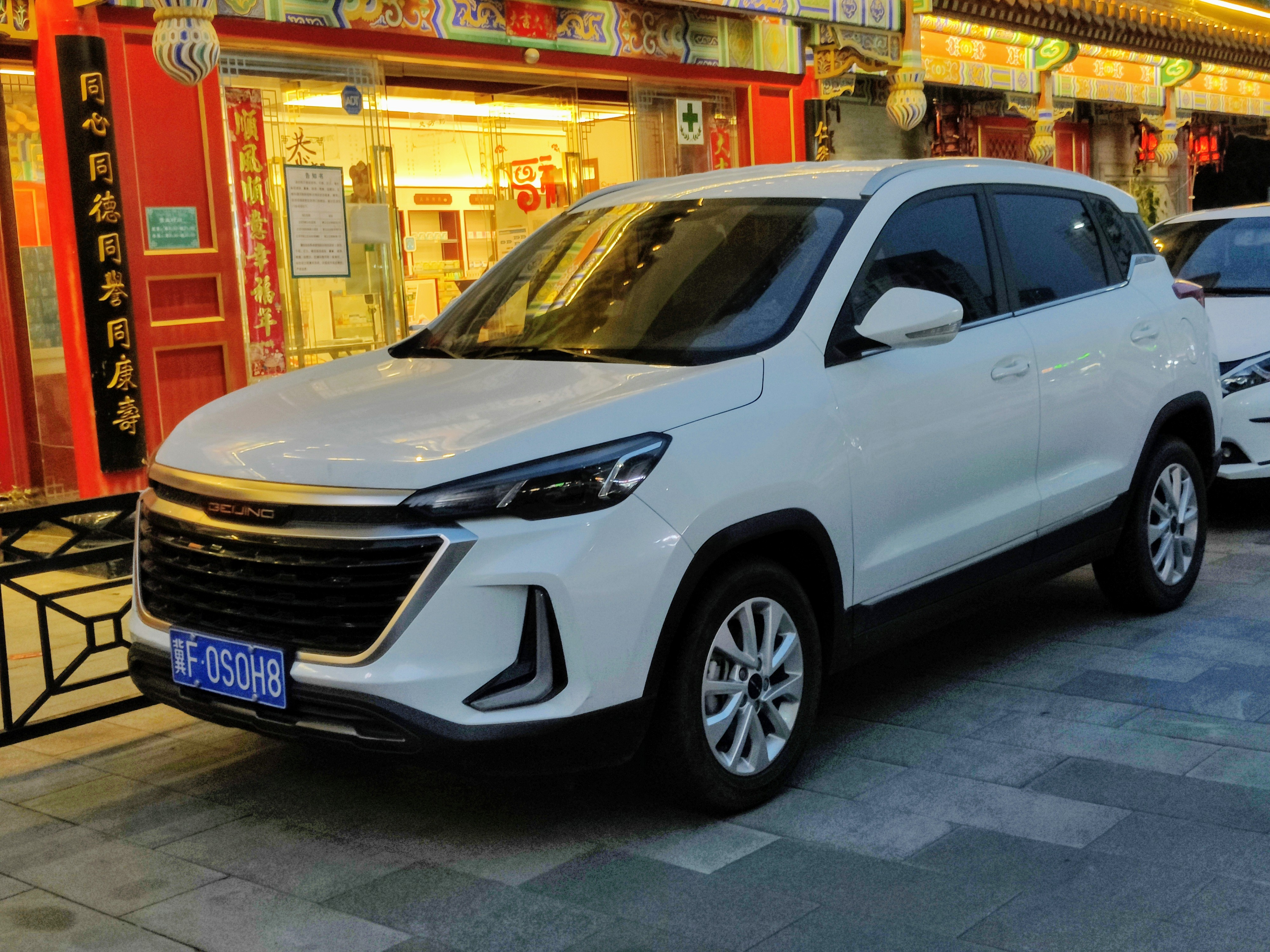

Overview
- Manufacturer: Beijing (BAIC)
- Production: 2016–present
- Model years: 2017–present

Body and chassis
- Class: Subcompact SUV
- Body style: 5-door crossover SUV

The Beijing X3 (Chinese: 北京X3) or previously the Senova X35 (Chinese: 绅宝X35) is a subcompact SUV positioned above the smaller Senova X25 produced by BAIC Motor under the Senova sub-brand and later the Beijing sub-brand.

== First generation (2016) ==
Senova X35
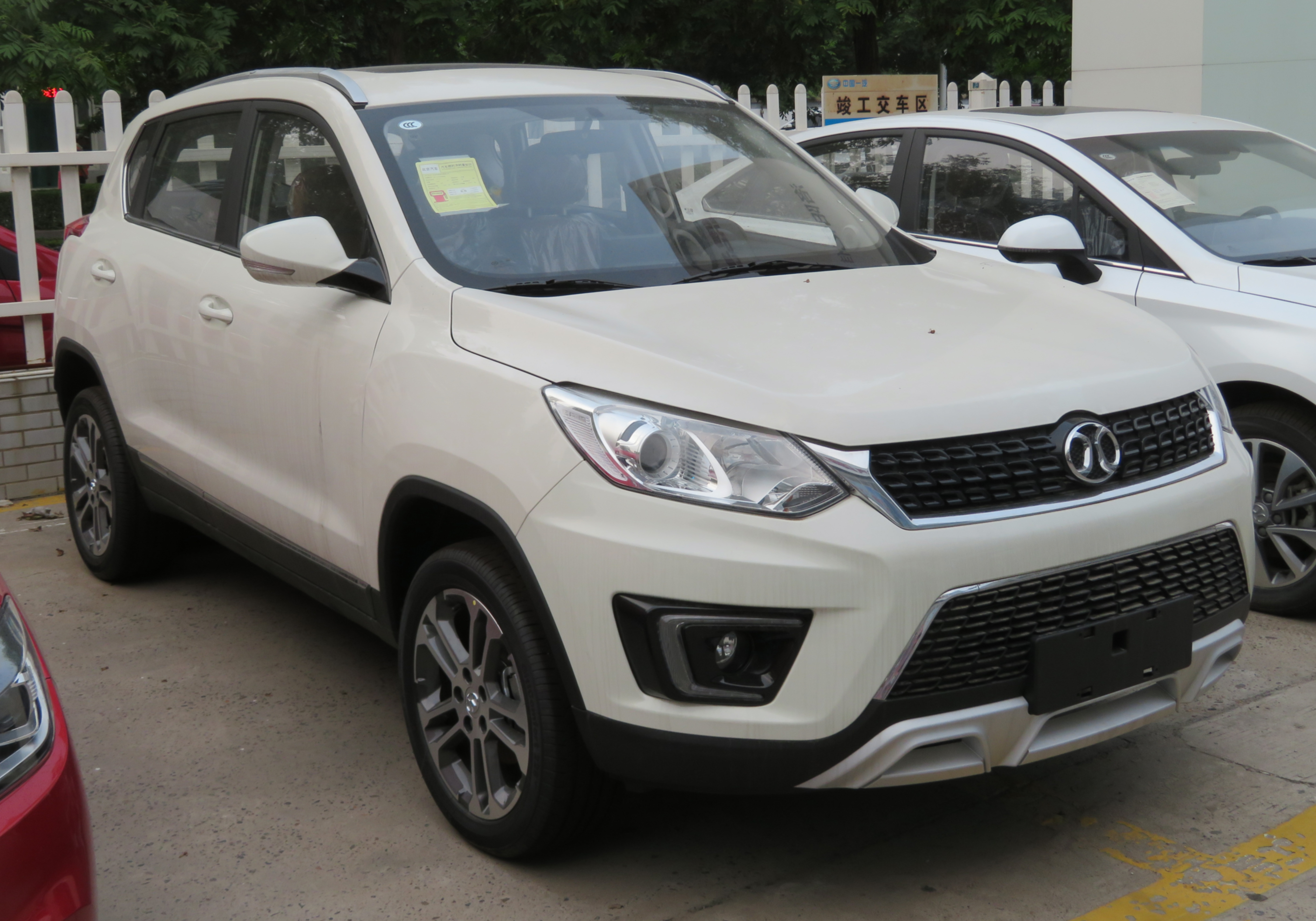

Overview
- Also called: BAIC X35
- Production: 2016–2018
- Model years: 2017–2019
- Assembly: Zhuzhou, China; Batna, Algeria

Body and chassis
- Layout: FF

Powertrain
- Engine: 1.5 L A151 I4 (petrol)
- Transmission: 5-speed manual 4-speed automatic

Dimensions
- Wheelbase: 2,570 mm (101.2 in)
- Length: 4,300 mm (169.3 in)
- Width: 1,815 mm (71.5 in)
- Height: 1,640 mm (64.6 in)

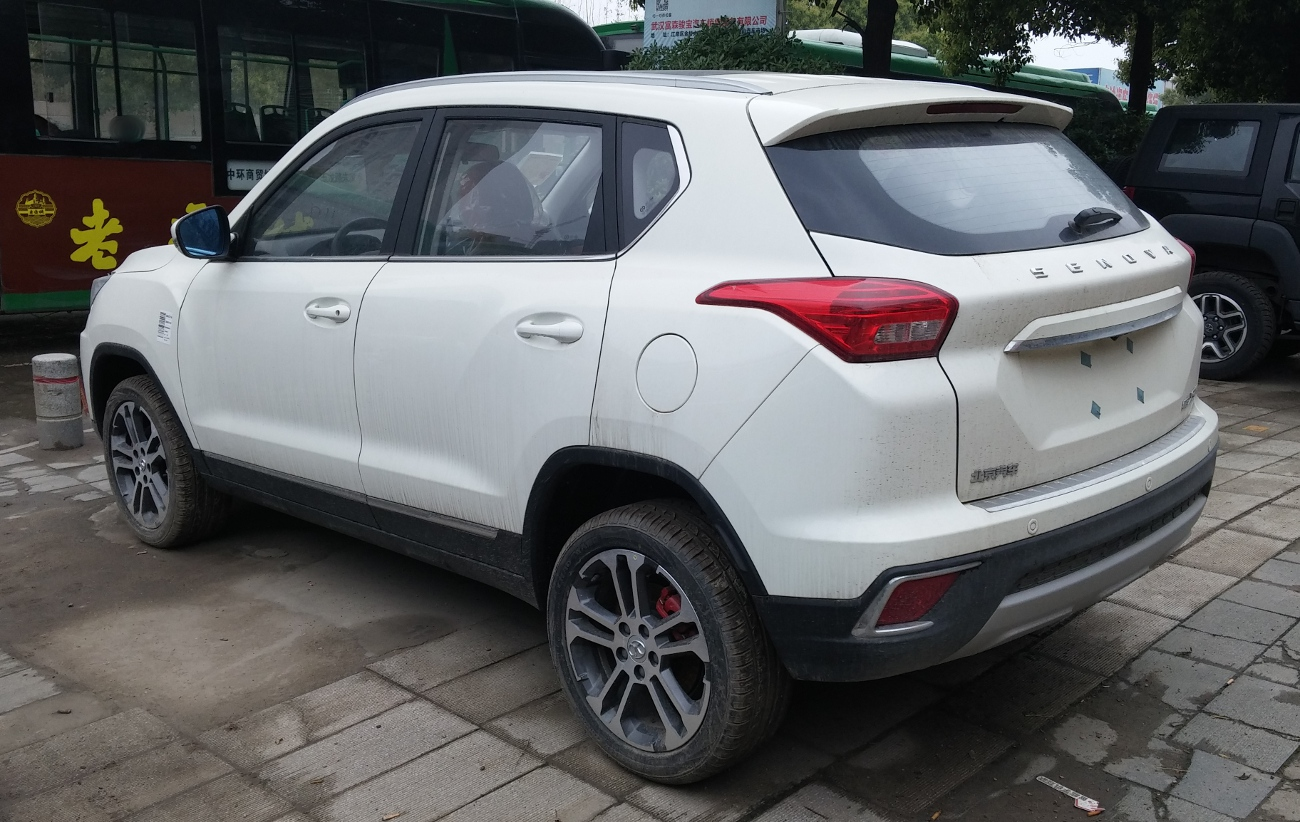
Rear view

Debuting on the 2016 Beijing Auto Show in China, the pricing of the X35 was estimated to start around 70,000 yuan to 90,000 yuan, positioning the crossover under the compact Senova X55 CUV. The Senova X35 is powered by a 1.5 liter petrol engine producing 87 kW (116 hp) and 148 N⋅m (109 lb⋅ft) of torque powering the front wheels via a five-speed manual gearbox or a four-speed automatic gearbox. A 1.5 liter turbo engine mated to a six-speed automatic gearbox was added to the line-up later.

== Second generation (2019) ==
Beijing X3
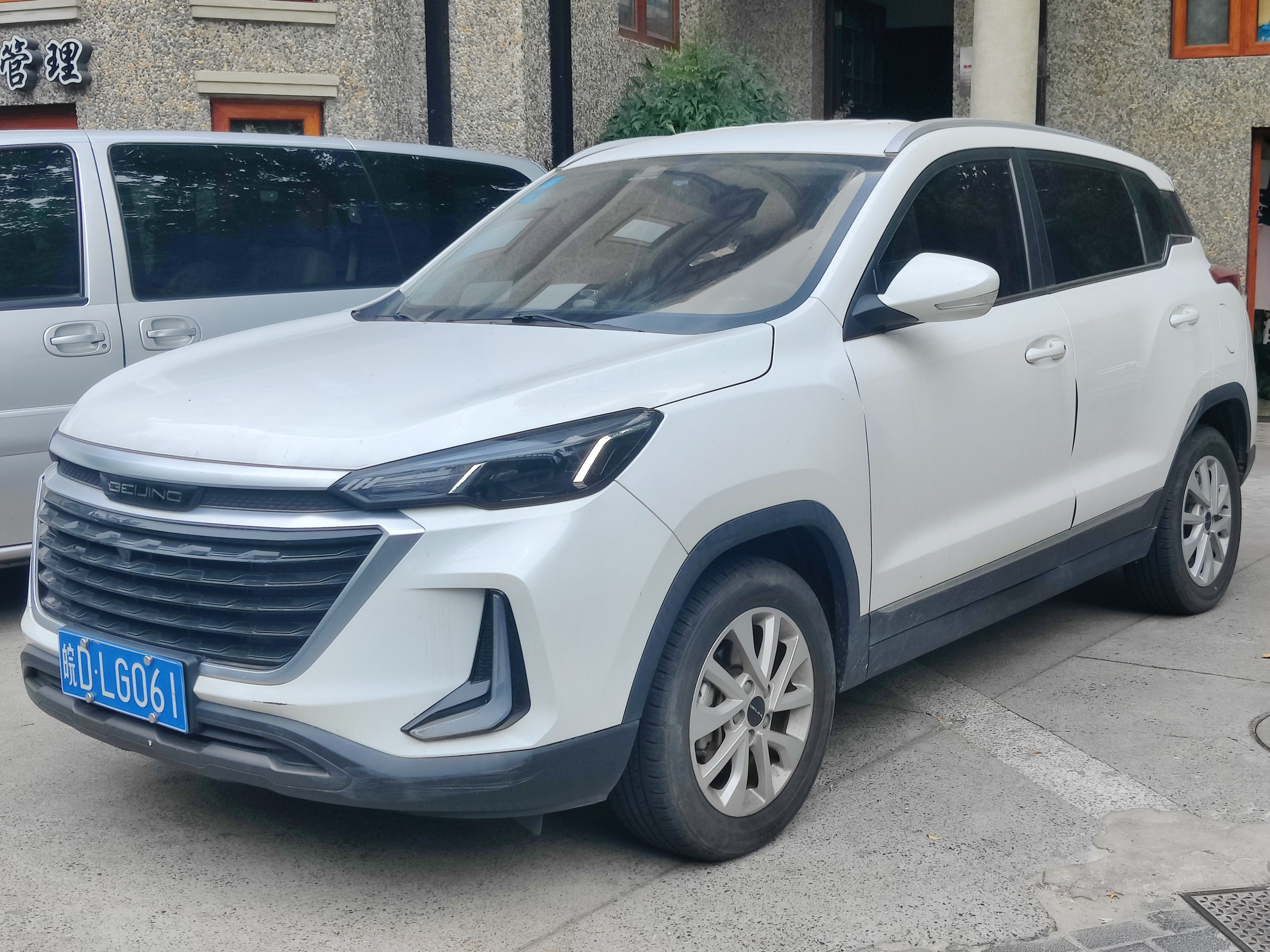

Overview
- Also called: Senova X35 Zhida; Beijing X3; BAIC Beijing 3 (Poland); Tigard X35 (Iran); EVO 5 (Italy); Cirelli 2 (Italy)
- Production: 2019–2024 (China); 2020–present (export)
- Model years: 2020–present
- Assembly: Zhuzhou, China; Golpayegan, Iran (Diar); Kaliningrad, Russia (Avtotor)

Body and chassis
- Layout: FF

Powertrain
- Engine: 1.5 L A151 I4 (turbo petrol)
- Transmission: 6 speed manual 4 speed automatic CVT

Dimensions
- Wheelbase: 2,570 mm (101.2 in)
- Length: 4,325 mm (170.3 in)
- Width: 1,830 mm (72.0 in)
- Height: 1,640 mm (64.6 in)

The second generation Senova X35 was unveiled in April 2019 during the 2019 Shanghai Auto Show with the Chinese name "Zhida" (智达). Despite being essentially an extensive facelift of the first generation X35, the Senova X35 Zhida was completely redesigned featuring the new "Offspace" design language. The Senova X35 Zhida is powered by a 1.5 liter turbo engine producing 110 kW (148 hp) and 210 N⋅m (150 lb⋅ft) of torque mated to a CVT.

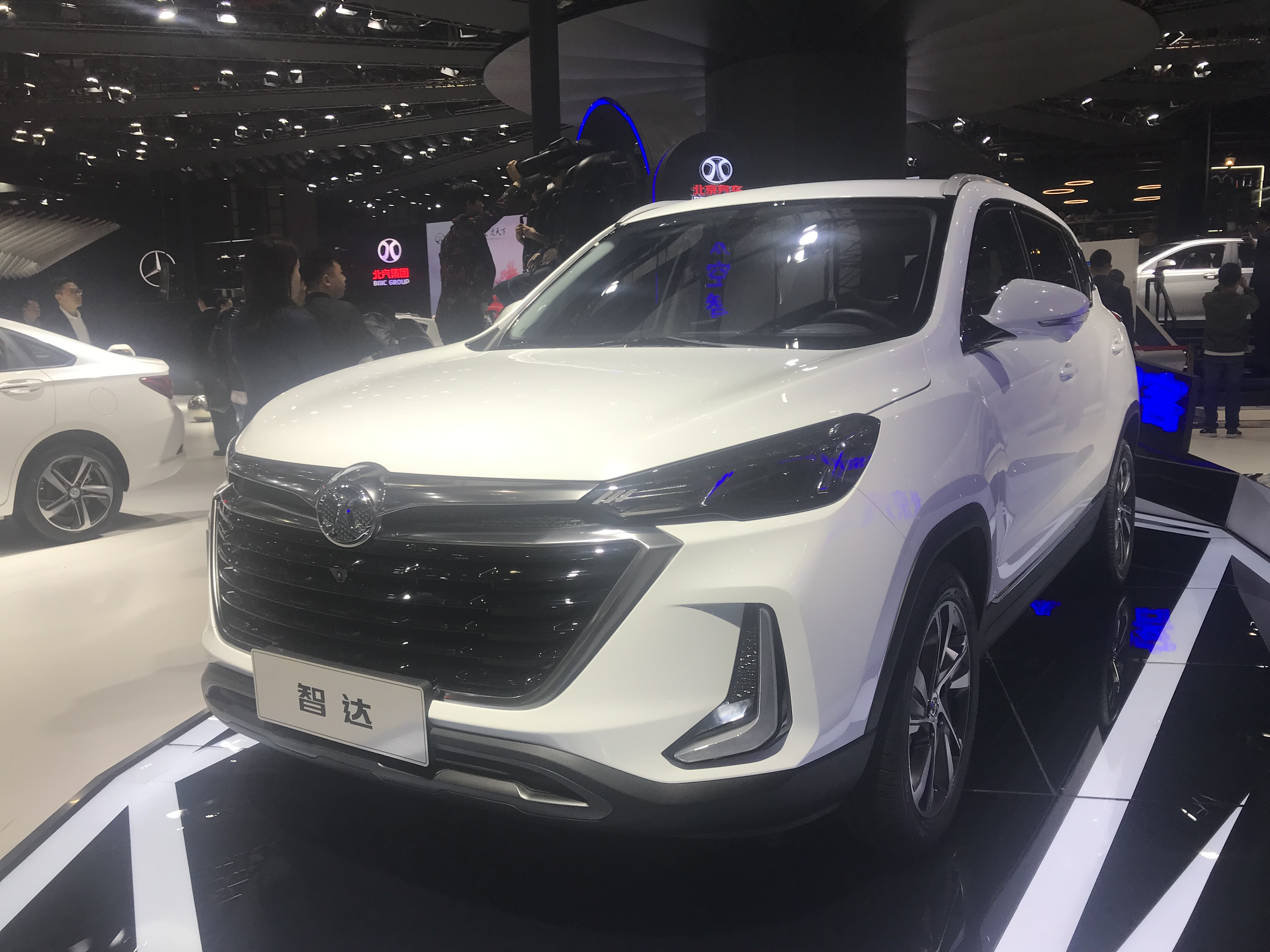
Senova X35 Zhida

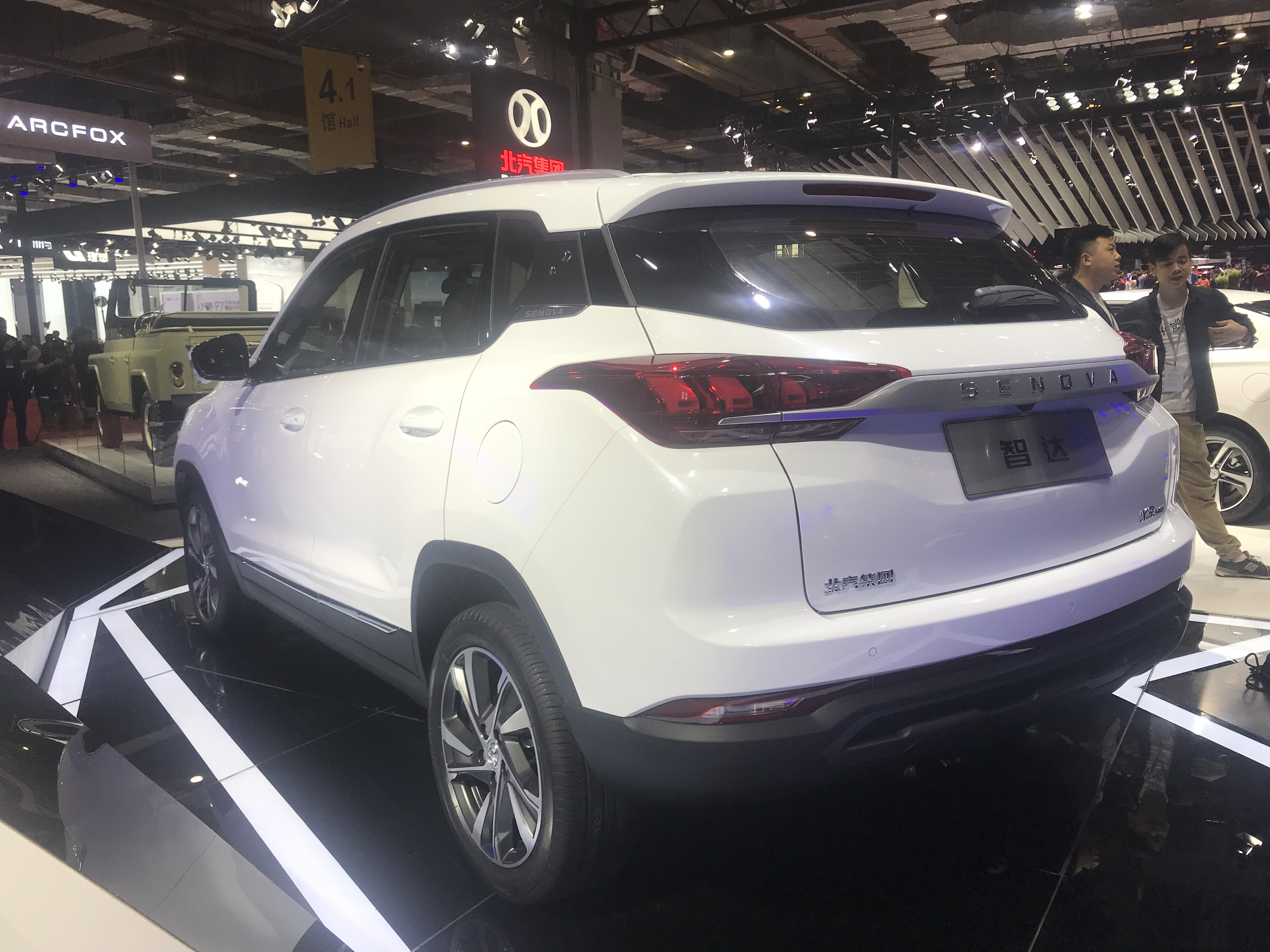
Rear view

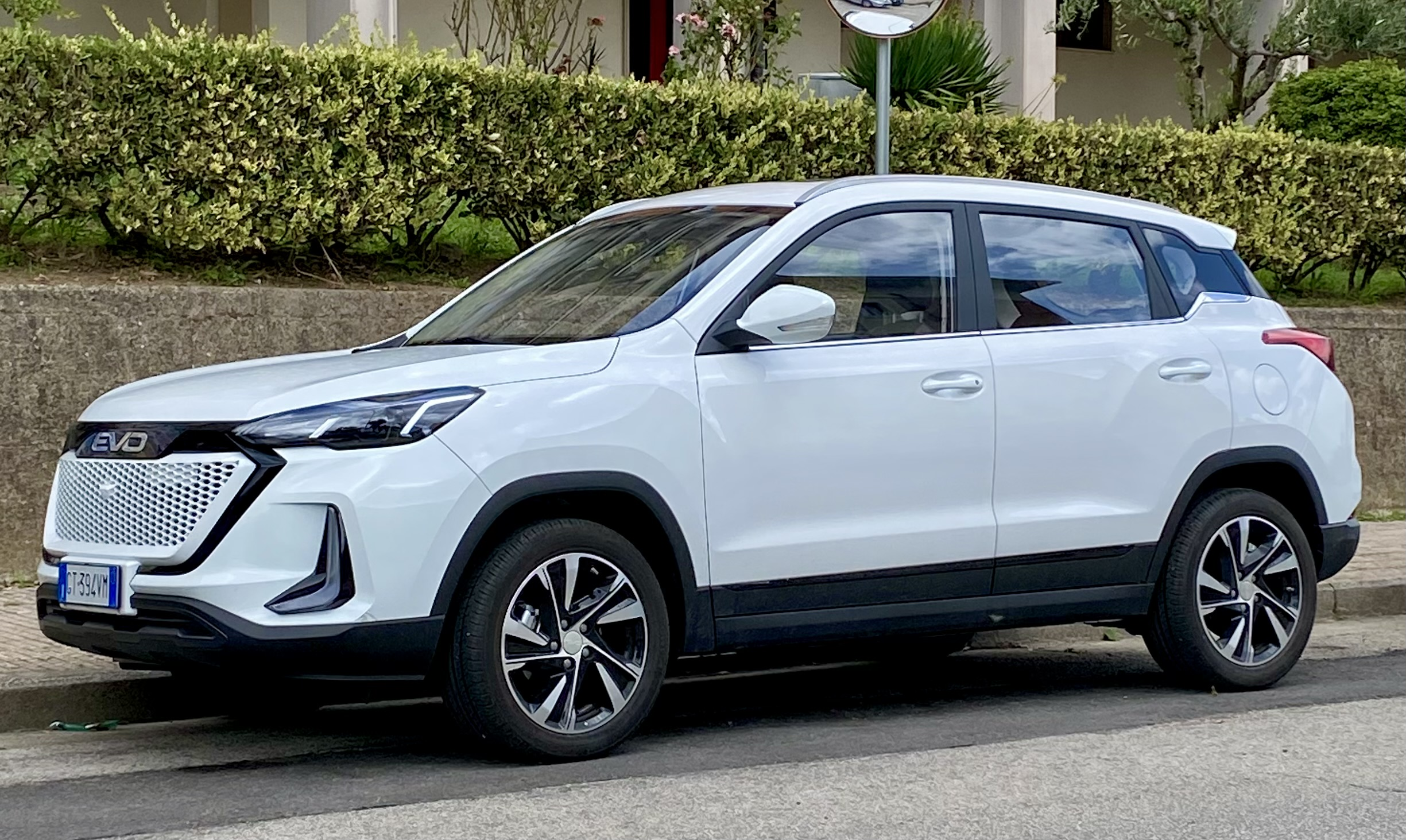
The EVO 5, sold in Italy by DR Automobiles.

As of 2020, the second generation model was later renamed to Beijing X3 after the launch of the revamped Beijing brand.

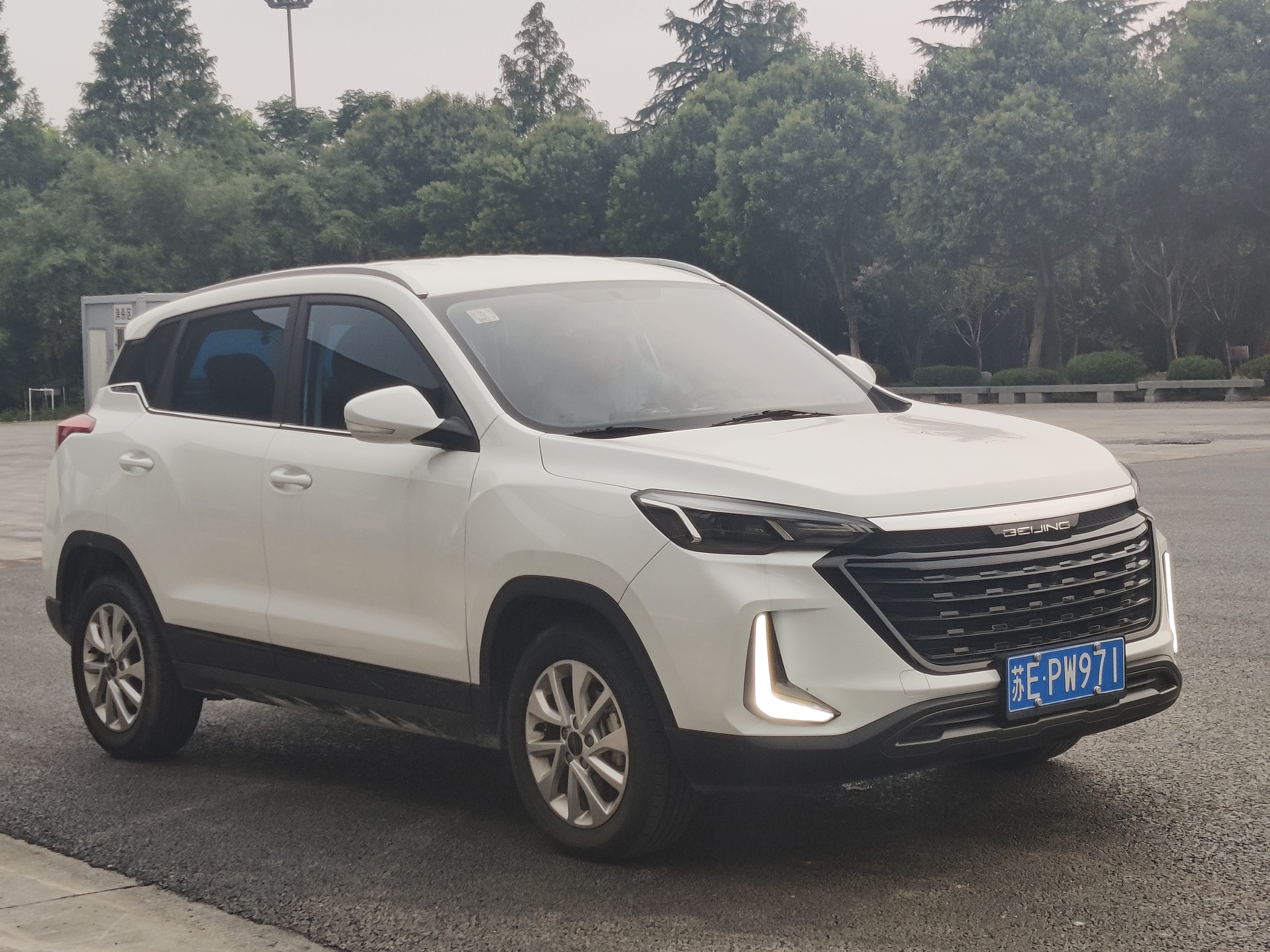
Beijing X3

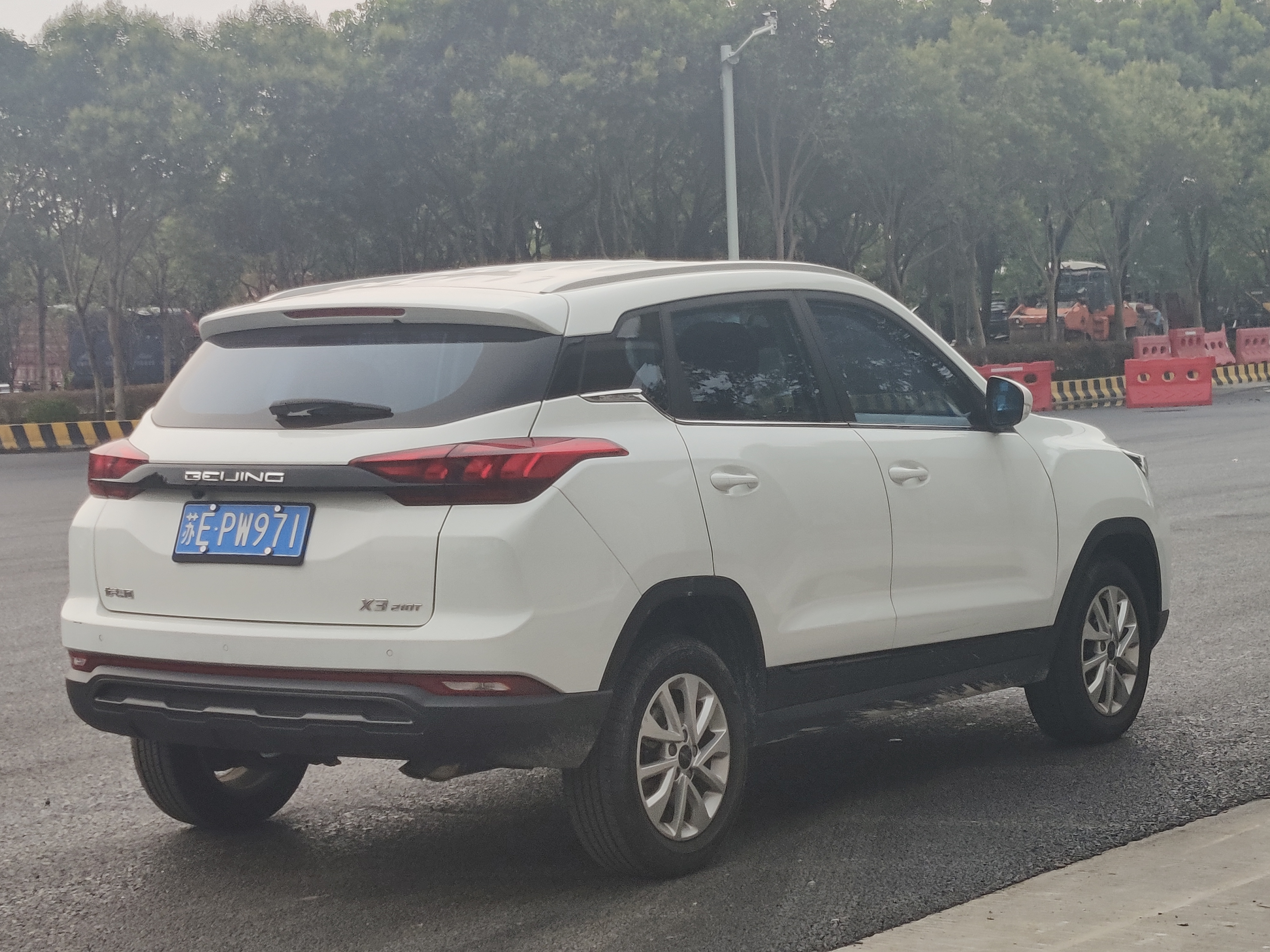
Rear view

== Sales ==
Year	China
2023	2,231
2024	5
