= Changhe Q25 =

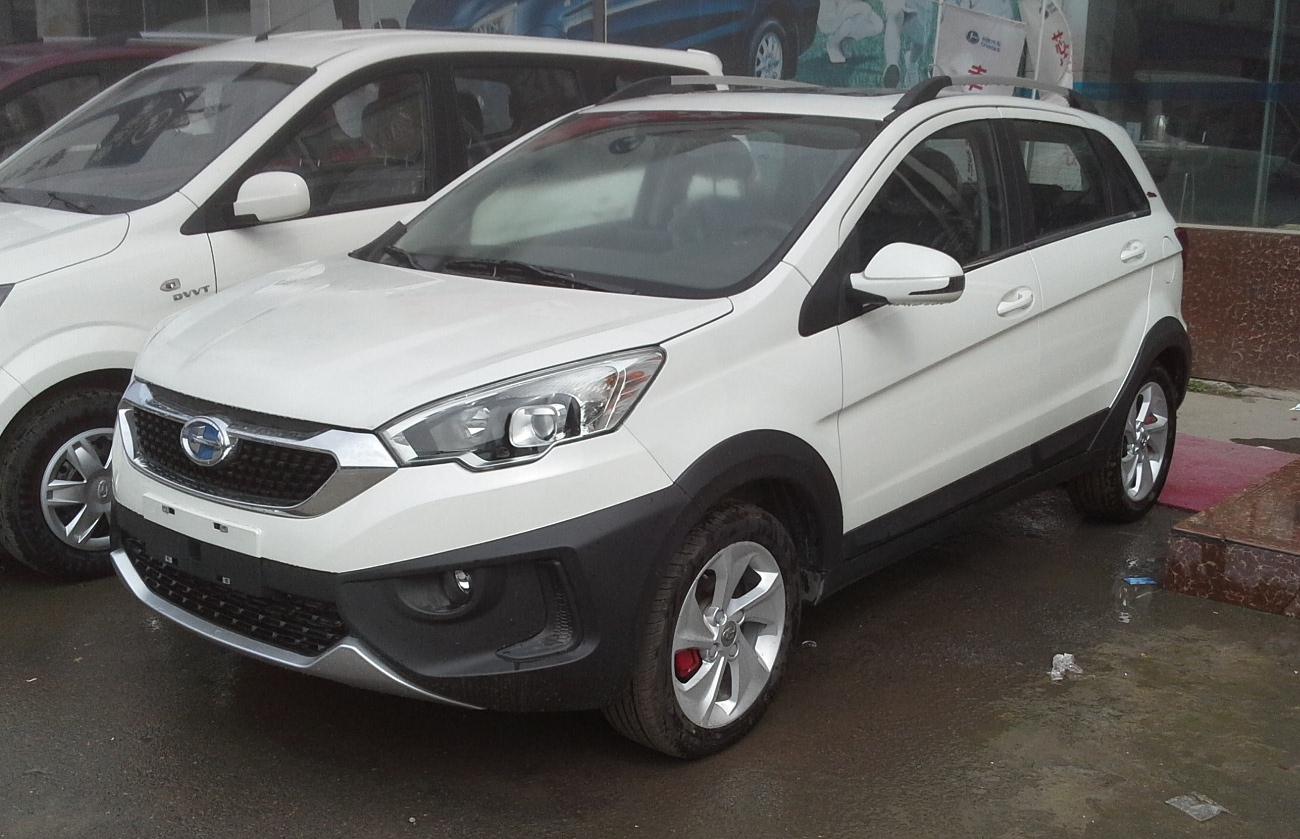

Overview
- Manufacturer: Changhe
- Production: 2015–2019
- Model years: 2016–2019

Body and chassis
- Class: Subcompact SUV
- Body style: 5-door hatchback
- Layout: FF
- Related: Senova D20; Senova X25; Mitsubishi Colt; Smart Forfour (1st generation)

Powertrain
- Engine: 1.3L I4; 1.5L I4
- Transmission: 5-speed manual; 5-speed automatic

Dimensions
- Wheelbase: 2,519 mm (99.2 in)
- Length: 4,095 mm (161.2 in)
- Width: 1,750 mm (68.9 in)
- Height: 1,545 mm (60.8 in)
- Curb weight: 1,539–1,553 kg (3,393–3,424 lb)

The Changhe Q25 is a subcompact SUV produced by Changhe. It was the second car released under BAIC ownership, after the Freedom/Furuida M50.

== Overview ==
The Changhe Q25 was built on the same platforms with the Senova X25.

Unveiled during the 2015 Guangzhou Auto Show, the pricing of the Q25 starts at 55,900 yuan (US$8,153) and ends at 76,900 yuan (US$11,197), positioning slightly upmarket compared to the Senova X25.

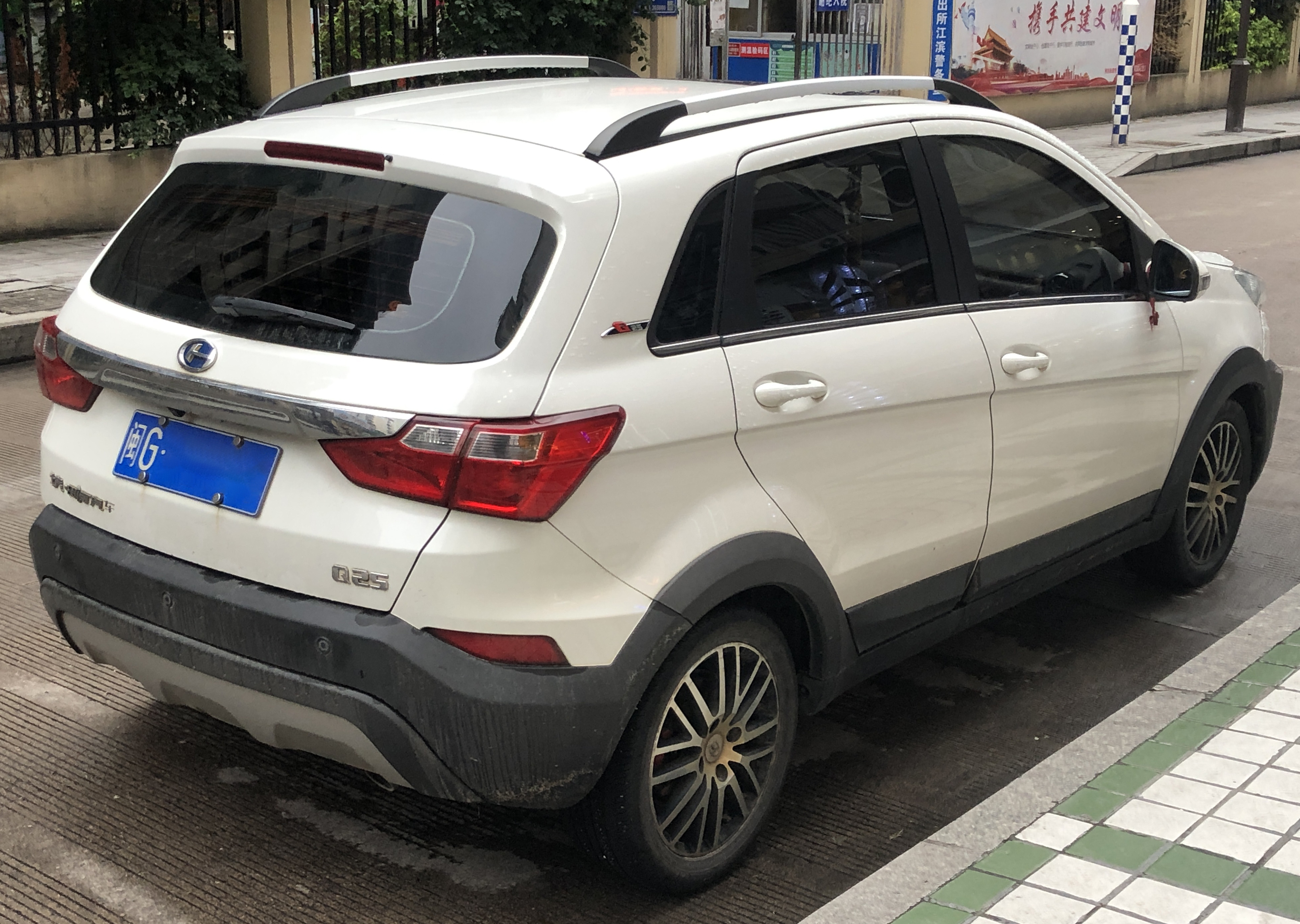
Rear view
