= Senova X25 =

Senova (BAIC) X25
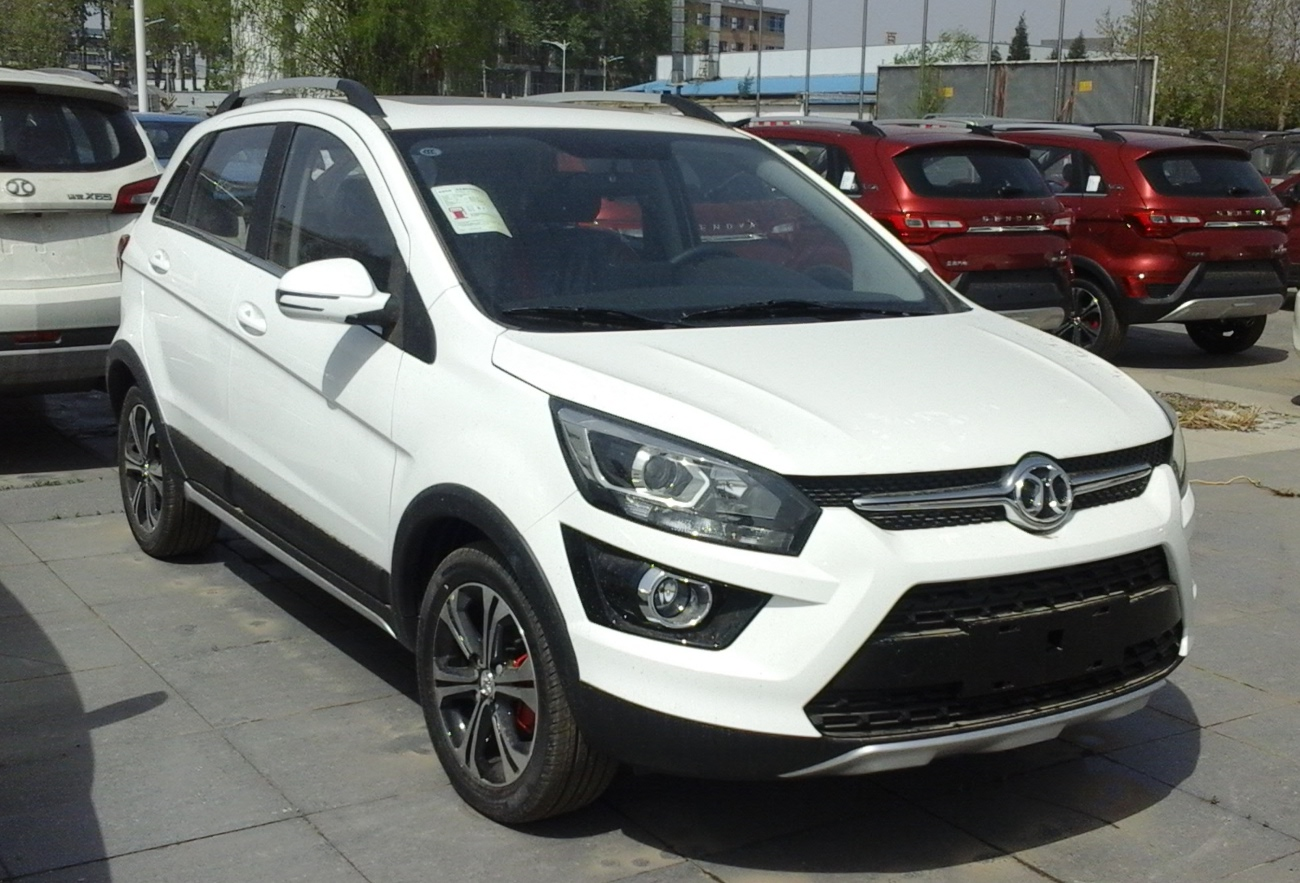

Overview
- Manufacturer: Senova (BAIC Motor)
- Also called: BAIC X25 (Algeria, Iran); BJEV EX360 (NEV version); BJEV EC5 (EV facelift); Micro X25 (Sri Lanka); Beijing EC5
- Production: 2015–2019
- Model years: 2015–2019
- Assembly: Beijing, China; Veracruz, Mexico; Batna, Algeria; Golpayegan, Iran

Body and chassis
- Class: Subcompact crossover SUV (B)
- Body style: 5-door SUV
- Layout: FF
- Related: Senova D20; Changhe Q25; Mitsubishi Colt; Smart Forfour (1st generation)

Powertrain
- Engine: 1.5 L A151 I4 (petrol)
- Transmission: 5-speed manual; 4-speed automatic

Dimensions
- Wheelbase: 2,519 mm (99.2 in)
- Length: 4,110 mm (161.8 in)
- Width: 1,750 mm (68.9 in)
- Height: 1,545 mm (60.8 in)
- Curb weight: 1,119–1,153 kg (2,467–2,542 lb)

The Senova (BAIC) X25 is a subcompact crossover SUV based on the Senova D20 hatchback produced by Senova, a sub-brand of BAIC Motor.

== Overview ==
Debuting on the 2015 Chengdu Auto Show in China, the pricing of the X25 starts at 55,800 yuan and ends at 75,800 yuan, positioning the crossover under the larger subcompact Senova X35 CUV. There is only one engine offered for the Senova X25, which is a Mitsubishi-sourced 1.5-liter inline-four engine producing 87 kW (116 hp) and 148 N⋅m (109 lb⋅ft), mated to a five-speed manual gearbox powering the front wheels. A 1.5-liter turbo engine mated to a four-speed automatic gearbox was added to the line-up in 2016.

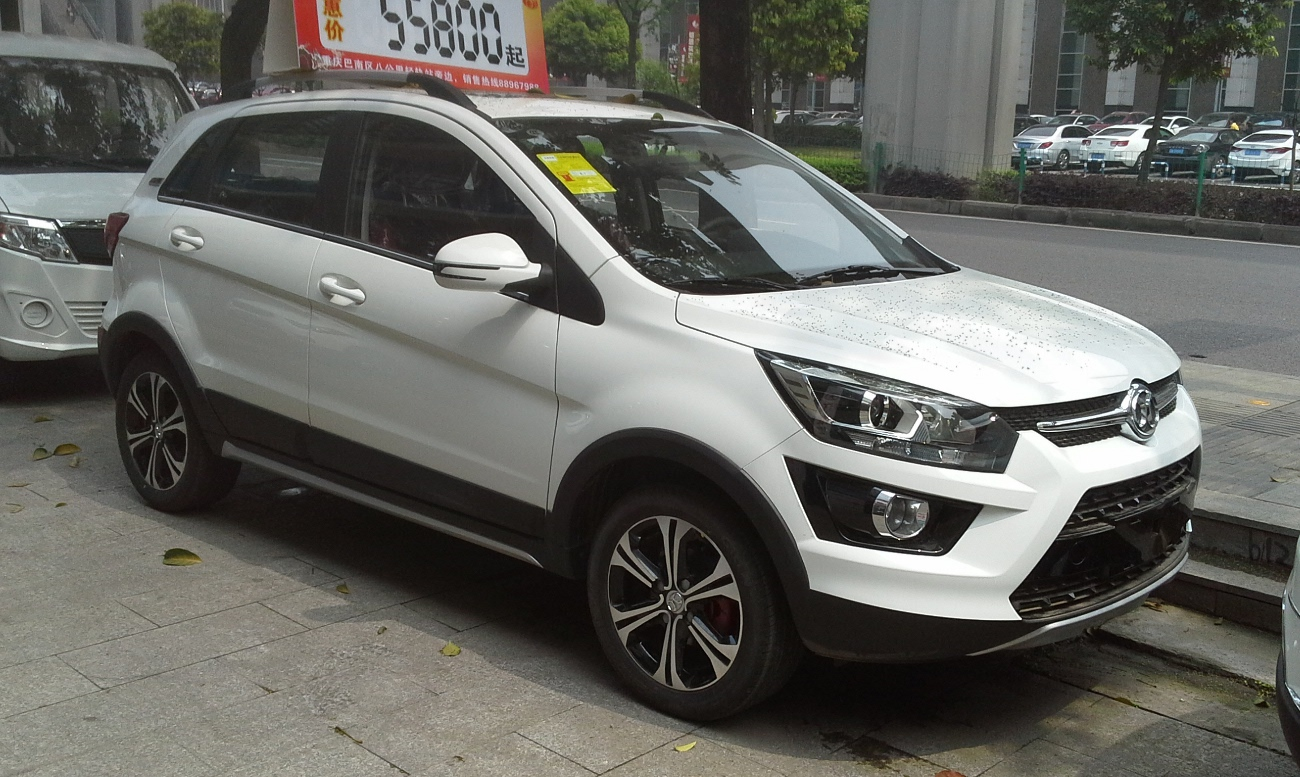
Senova X25 front.

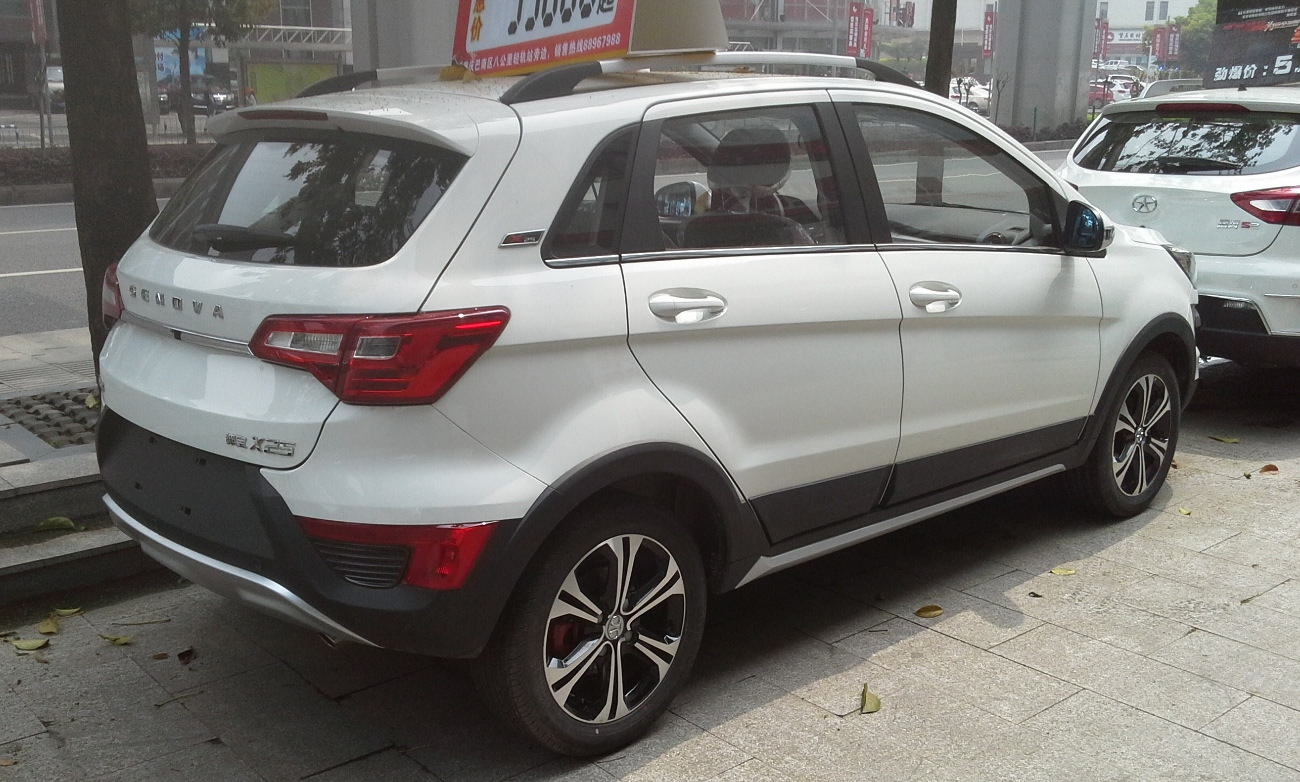
Senova X25 rear.

== BJEV EX360 ==
The BJEV EX360 is the NEV version of the Senova X25. With most of the structure being exactly the same as the regular Senova X25, the only visual differences are the subtile blue accents added on the exterior. The BJEV EX360 has a top speed of 125 km/h, and a maximum torque of 230 Nm.

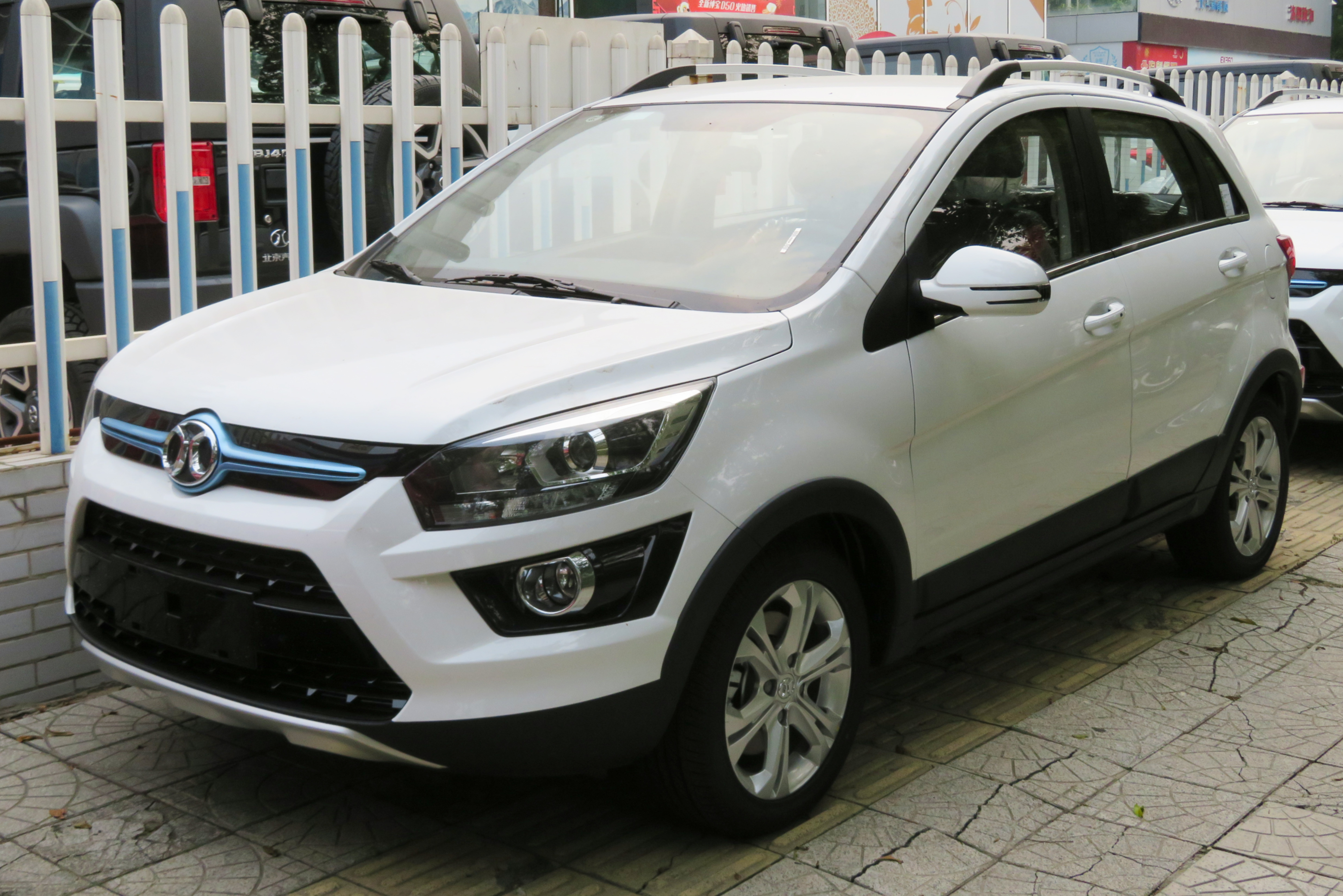
BJEV EX360

=== BJEV EC5/ Beijing EC5 ===
The BJEV EC5 and later the Beijing EC5 is the facelifted EX360 NEV featuring redesigned front and rear ends while continuing to utilize the same powertrain and battery. The EC5 debuted during the 2019 Shanghai Auto Show as an update to be more inline with the rest of the BJEV models.

The BJEV EX360 and EC5 is equipped with an electric motor producing 80 kW (107 hp) and 230 N⋅m (170 lb⋅ft) of torque, and connected to a 48.14 kWh battery. The NEDC tested range is 403 kilometers. Deliveries for the BJEV EC5 started in July 2019.

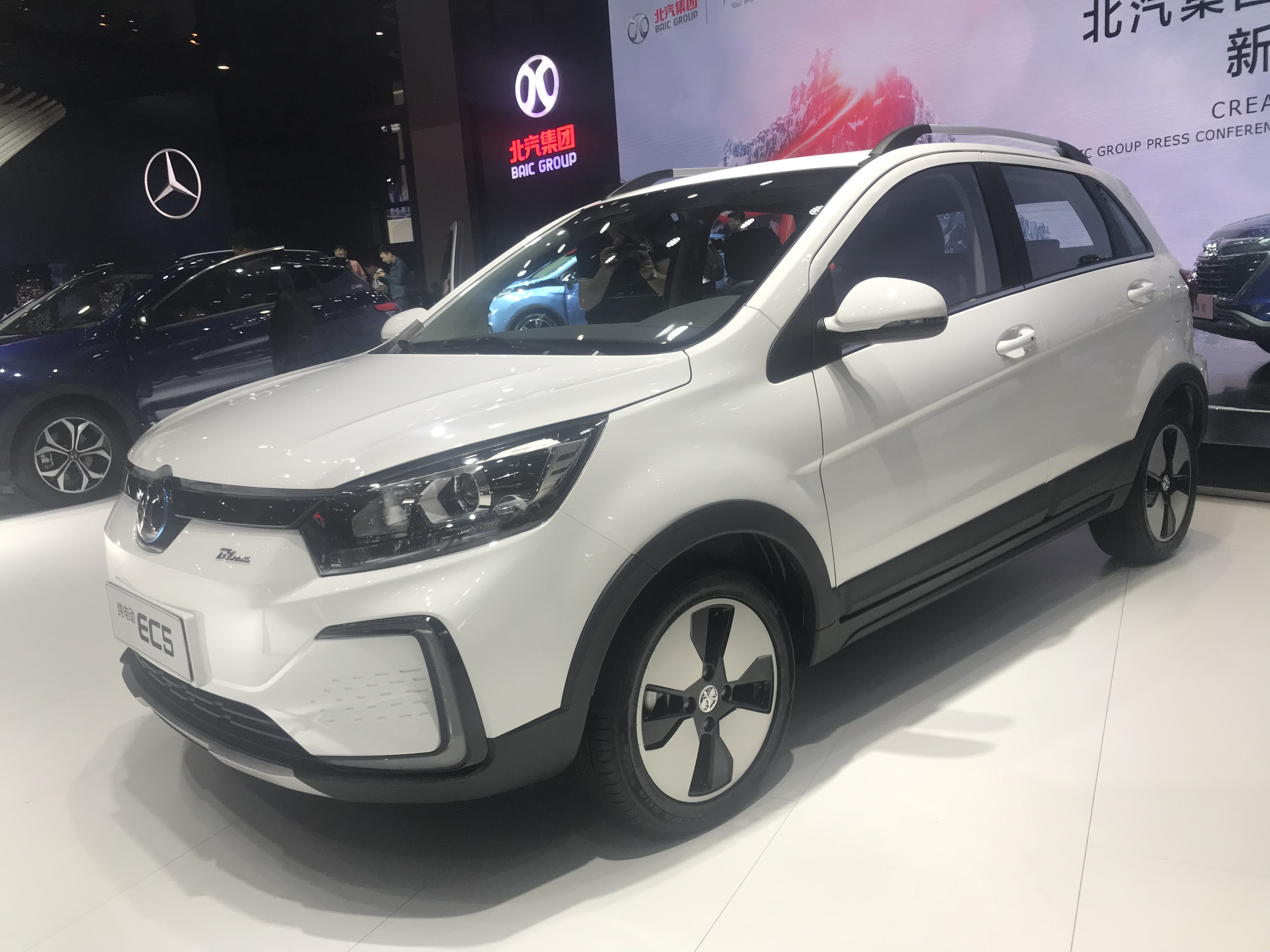
2019 BJEV EC5

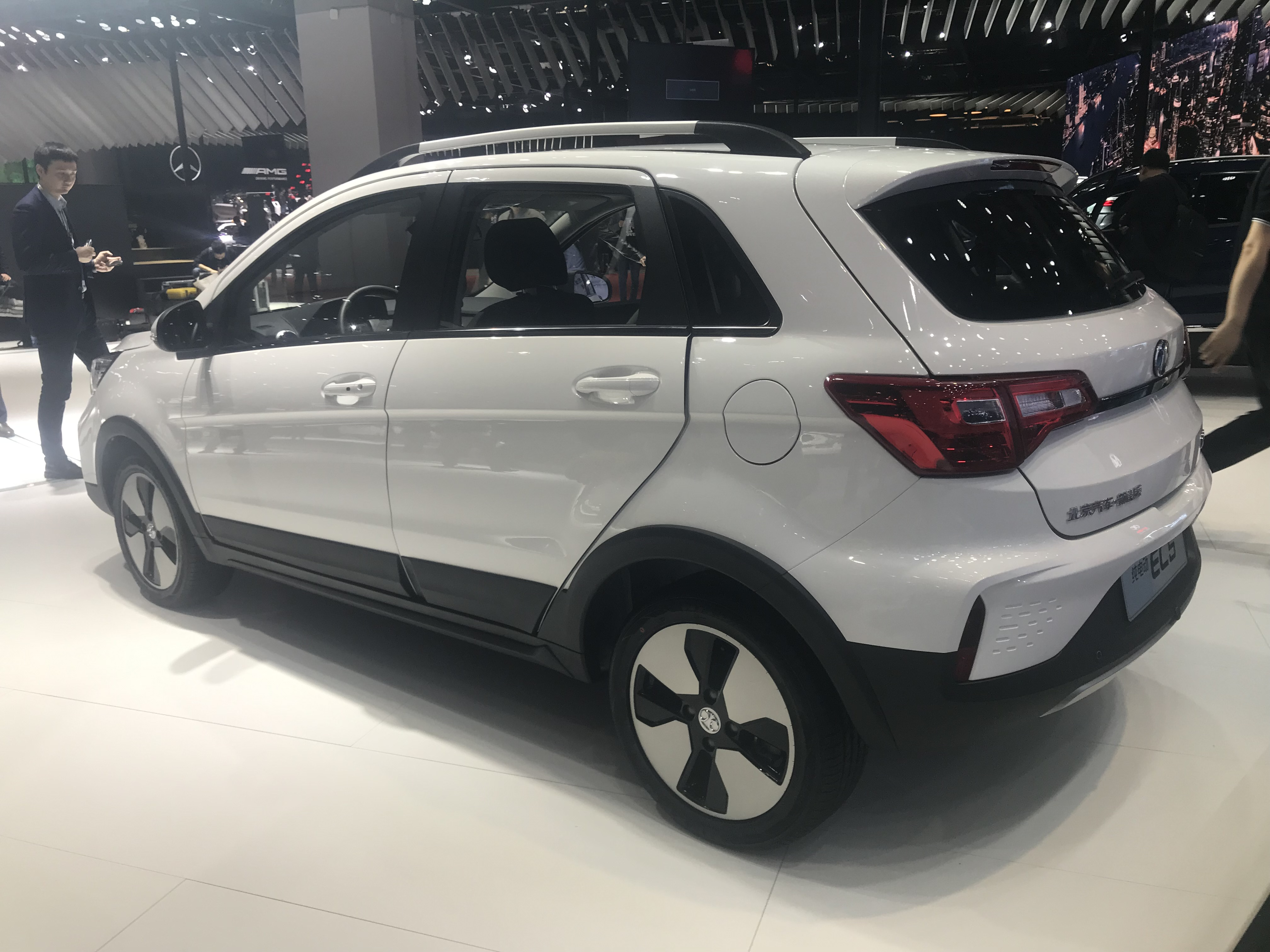
2019 BJEV EC5 rear
