= Senova D20 =

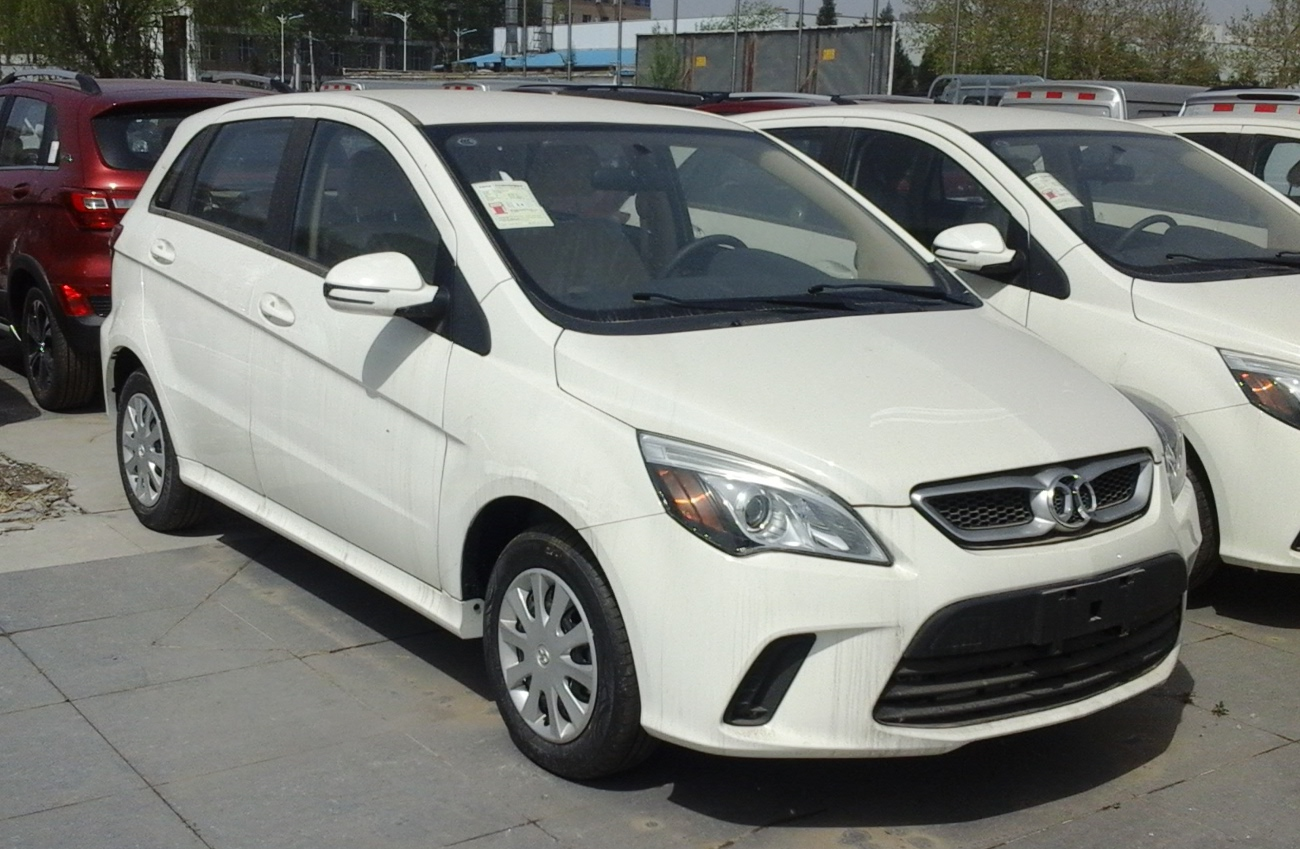

Overview
- Manufacturer: Senova
- Also called: Beijing Auto BC301; Beijing Auto E-Series; Beijing Auto E150; Beijing Auto E150EV; IVM Fox (Nigeria); IVM Umu (Nigeria); BAIC D20 (Algeria); Senova A1 (Egypt); Micro D20 (Sri Lanka); BAIC Sabrina (Iran); BAIC Up (Chile); Pyeonghwa Ppeokkugi 1515 (North Korea)
- Production: 2012–2020 (hatchback); 2013–2020 (sedan)
- Assembly: Beijing, China; Batna, Algeria; Golpayegan, Iran (Diar)

Body and chassis
- Class: Subcompact car
- Body style: 4-door sedan 5-door hatchback
- Layout: Front-engine, front-wheel-drive
- Related: Senova X25; Mitsubishi Colt (Z30); Smart Forfour (1st generation); Changhe Q25

Powertrain
- Engine: 1.3 L A131 I4 (petrol); 1.5 L A151 I4 (petrol)
- Electric motor: One 16 kW (21 hp; 22 PS)
- Transmission: 5-speed manual 4-speed automatic
- Battery: 25.6 kWh LFP
- Electric range: 150 km (93 mi)

Dimensions
- Wheelbase: 2,500 mm (98.4 in)
- Length: 4,040 mm (159.1 in) (hatchback and Cross); 4,322 mm (170.2 in) (sedan)
- Width: 1,720 mm (67.7 in) (hatchback and sedan); 1,745 mm (68.7 in) (Cross)
- Height: 1,500 mm (59.1 in) (sedan); 1,503 mm (59.2 in) (hatchback); 1,536 mm (60.5 in) (Cross)

The Senova D20 (Chinese: 绅宝D20) is a subcompact sedan and hatchback produced by BAIC under the Senova brand. Originally called the Beijing Auto E-Series when launched in 2012, the subcompact hatchback and sedan was renamed to Senova D20 in 2014 with the launch of the Senova brand.

== History ==
The original Beijing Auto E-series was listed and priced on the Chinese market with prices starting at 53,800 yuan and ending at 86,800 yuan. The E-series is available with two engines sourced from Mitsubishi, with the E150 model being powered by a 1.5 liter engine and the E130 model being powered by a 1.3 liter engine.

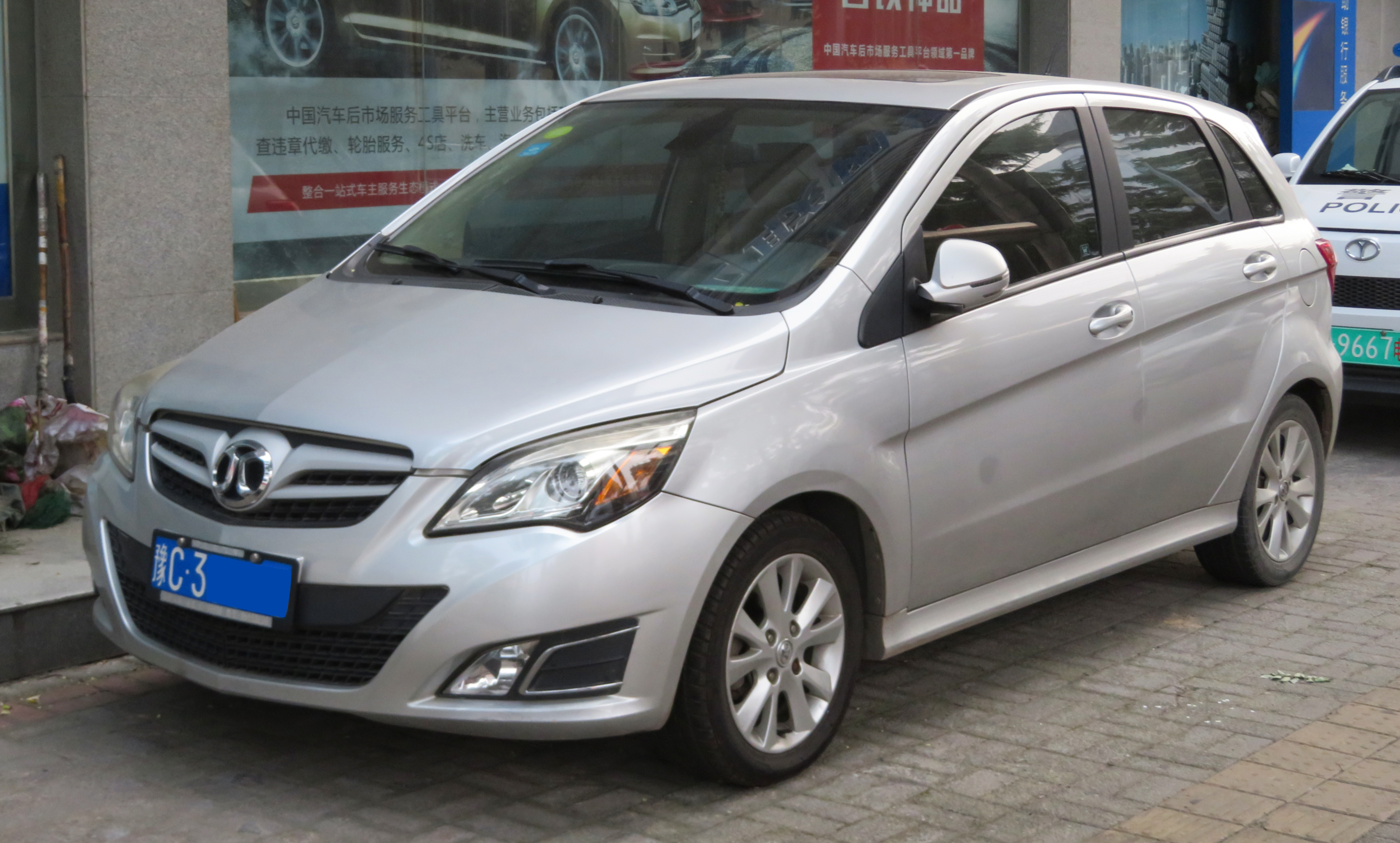
Beijing Auto E-Series hatch front

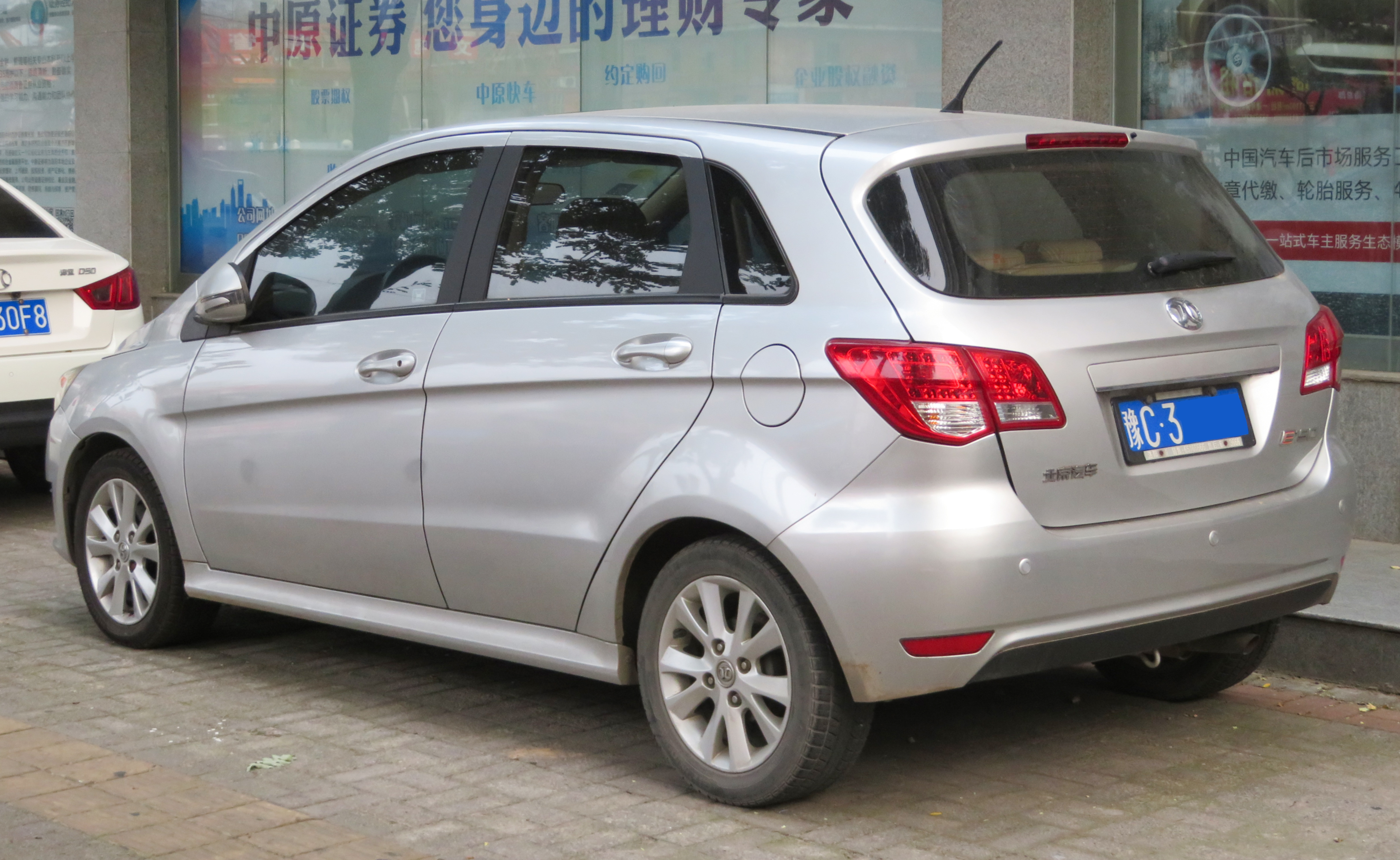
Beijing Auto E-Series hatch rear

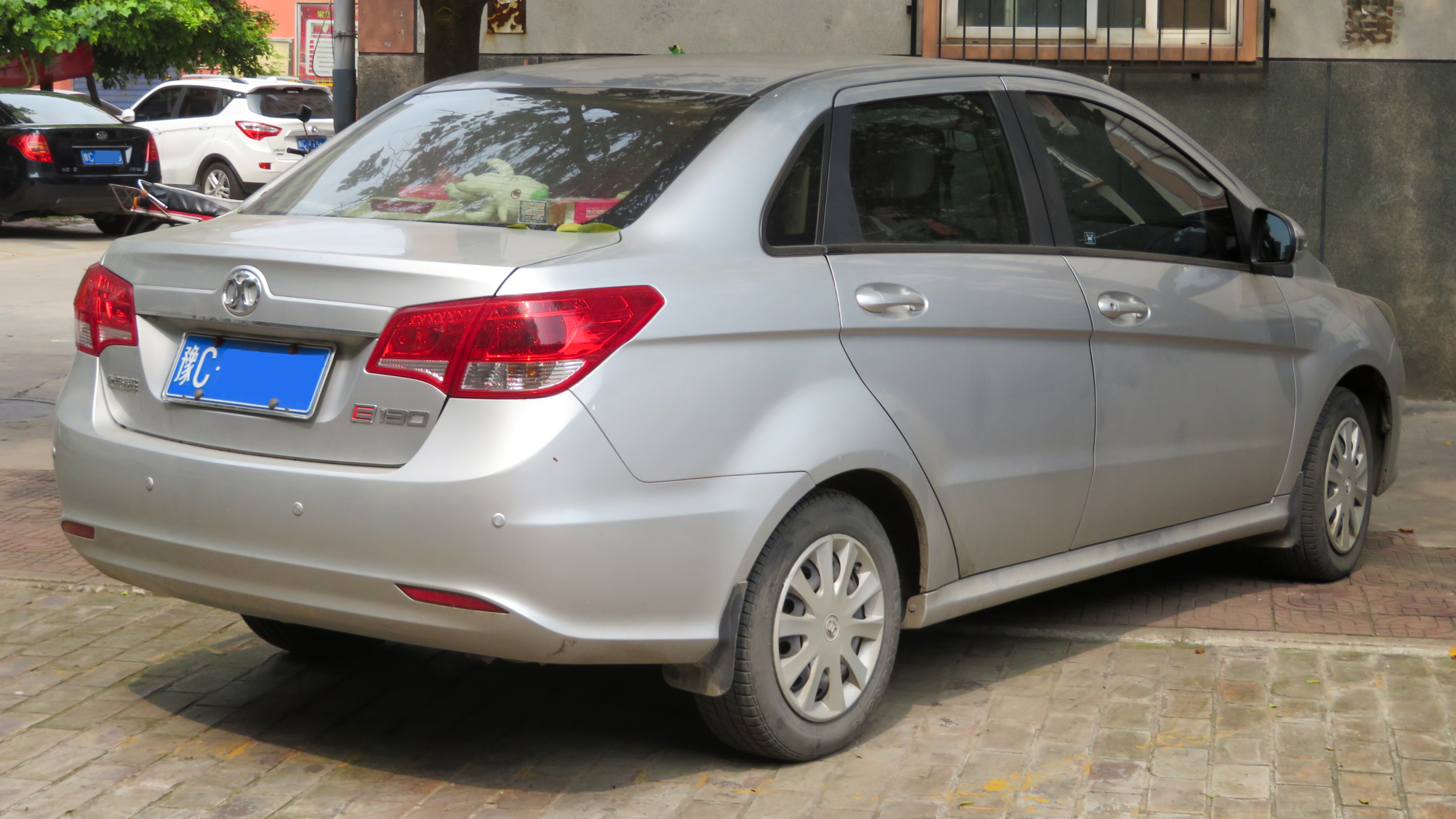
Beijing Auto E-Series sedan rear

On the 2014 Guangzhou Auto Show in China, the facelifted Beijing Auto E-Series was introduced as the Senova D20 and has been moved under the later-established Senova sub-brand. The original Beijing Auto E-Series has a price range of 58,800 yuan to 74,800 yuan. Engines: 74 kW (99 hp) 1.3 and a 84 kW (113 hp) 1.5, mated to a five-speed manual or a five-speed automatic. The E-Series is based on the same platform as the 2004 Smart Forfour/Mitsubishi Colt and styling-wise heavily inspired by the first generation Mercedes-Benz B-Class.

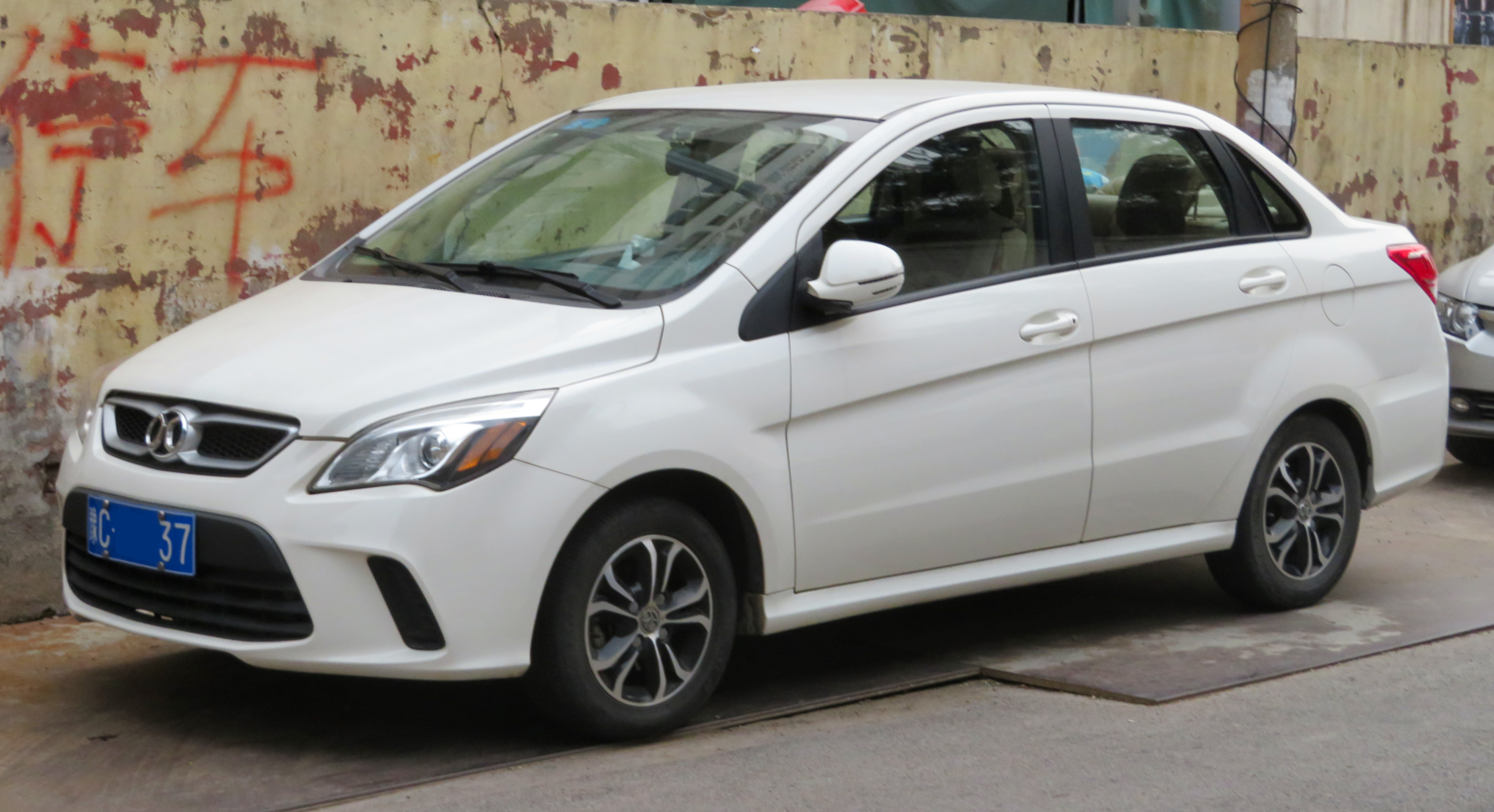
Senova D20 sedan front

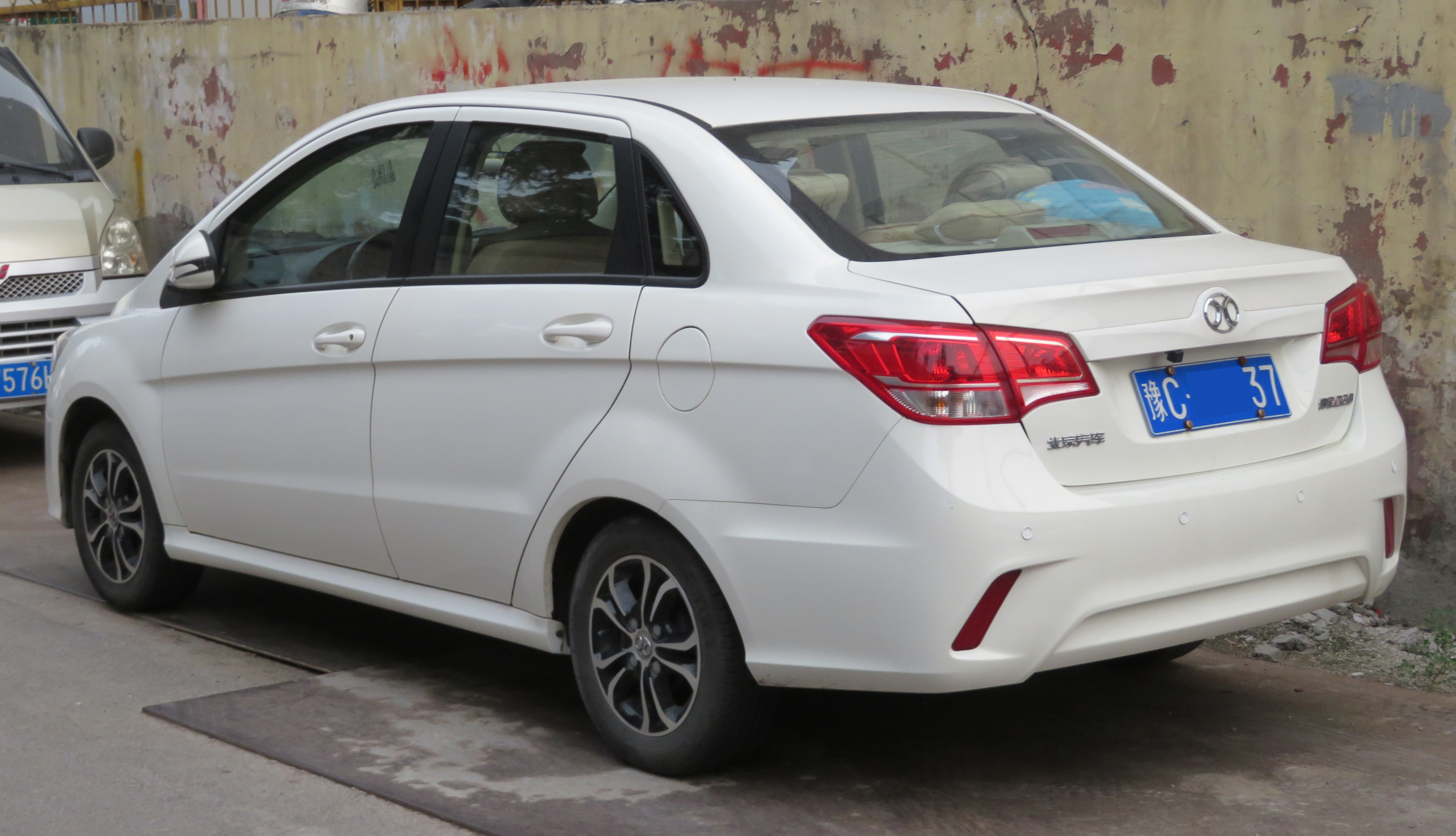
Senova D20 sedan rear

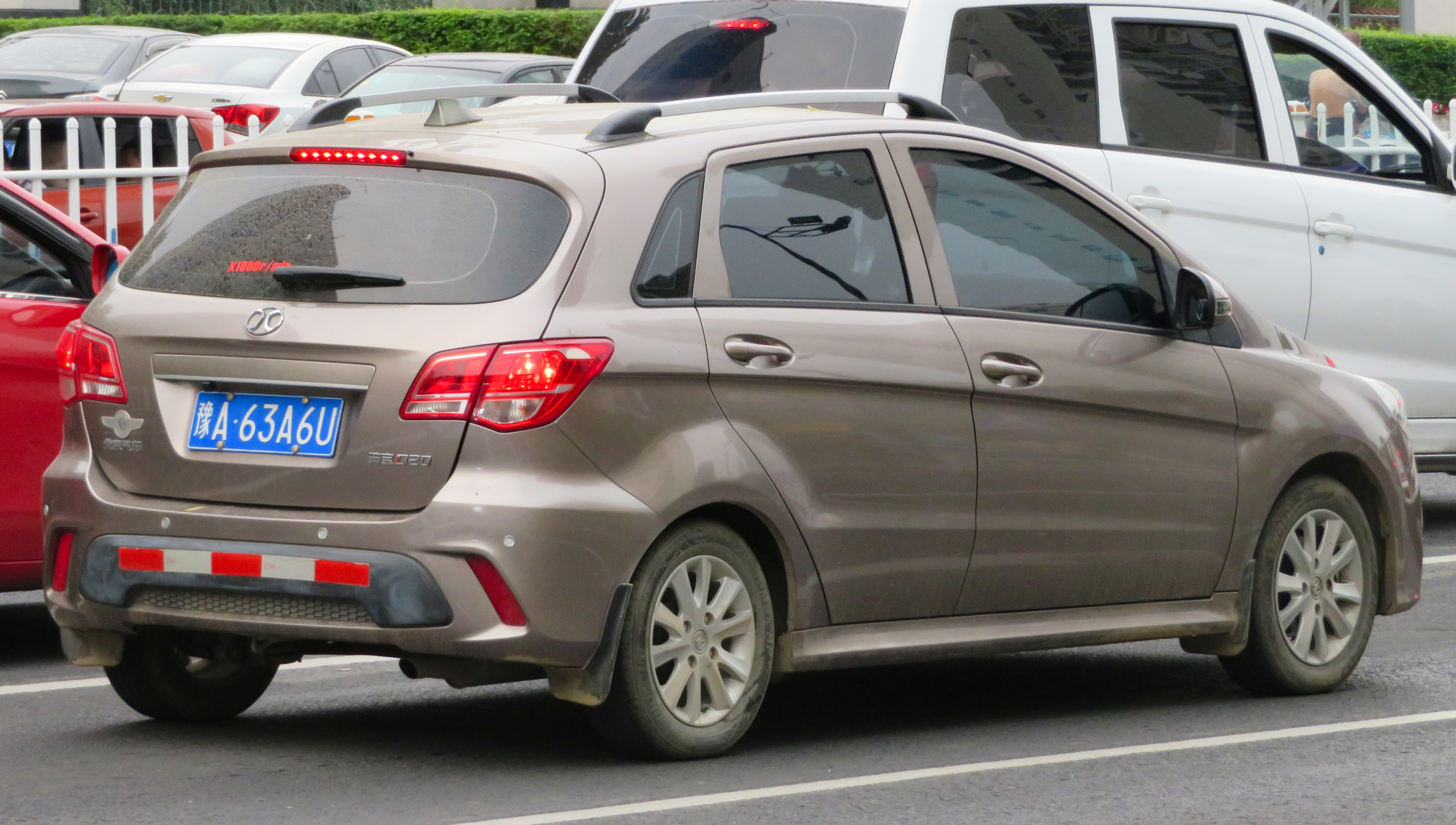
Senova D20 hatch rear

=== Beijing Auto E150EV ===
The E150EV is the electric vehicle version of the Beijing Auto E-series. The E150 is powered by a 16kW electric motor made by the Beijing Electric Power Corporation with a top speed of 120 km/h, a range of 150 km, and charging takes 6-8 hours.
