= Arcfox Wendao V9 =

Range-extended full-size minivan

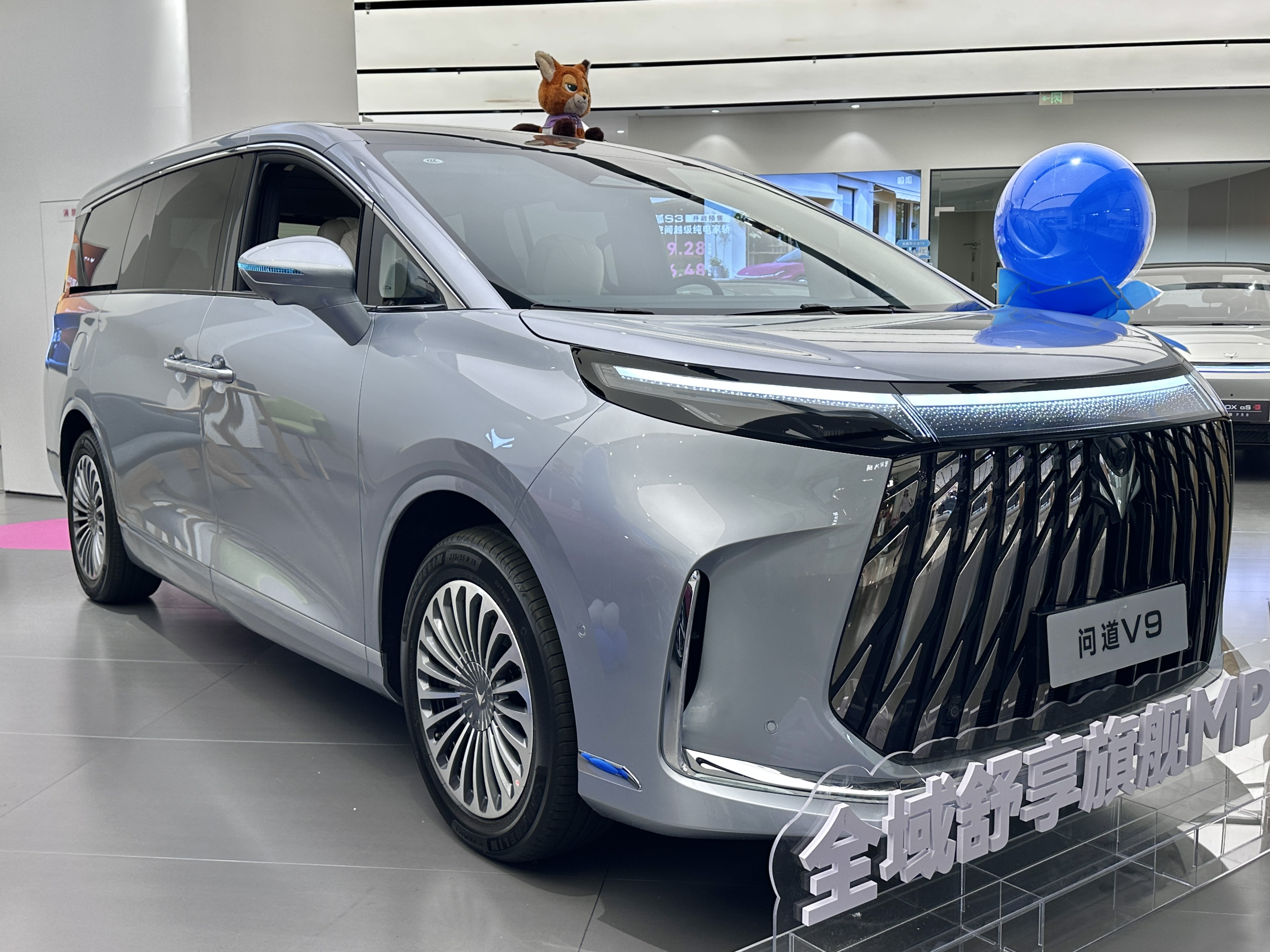
- The Arcfox Wendao V9 on display in a Showroom in Shanghai.

Overview
- Manufacturer: Arcfox (BAIC Group)
- Model code: N80KS
- Also called: Arcfox 77° (concept)
- Production: 2026–present
- Assembly: China: Zhenjiang

Body and chassis
- Class: Full-size minivan (M)
- Body style: 5-door minivan
- Platform: Polaris Architecture
- Related: Stelato S9

Powertrain
- Engine: Petrol range extender: 1.5 L A156T2H turbo I4
- Hybrid drivetrain: Series (EREV)
- Battery: Lithium iron phosphate
- Range: Expected to be 932 mi (1,500 km)

Dimensions
- Wheelbase: 3,200 mm (126.0 in)
- Length: 5,300 mm (208.7 in)
- Width: 1,980 mm (78.0 in)
- Height: 1,850 mm (72.8 in)
- Curb weight: 2,580 kg (5,688 lb)

The Arcfox Wendao V9 (Chinese: 极狐问道V9) is a range-extended full-size minivan produced by the BAIC Group under the Arcfox brand.

== Overview ==
On February 9, 2026, Arcfox introduced its new Wendao series, which according to information published on social media platforms, will focus on mid-to-large MPVs and SUVs. The V9 is the first model of the Wendao series. It will compete with the Denza D9 and Luxeed V9.

The Polaris Architecture underpins of the Wendao V9. It is related to the Stelato S9 as the Polaris Architecture and the BE22 are the same platform. The Wendao V9 uses a seven-seater layout.

An undisguised prototype was spotted ahead of the 2025 Guangzhou Auto Show.

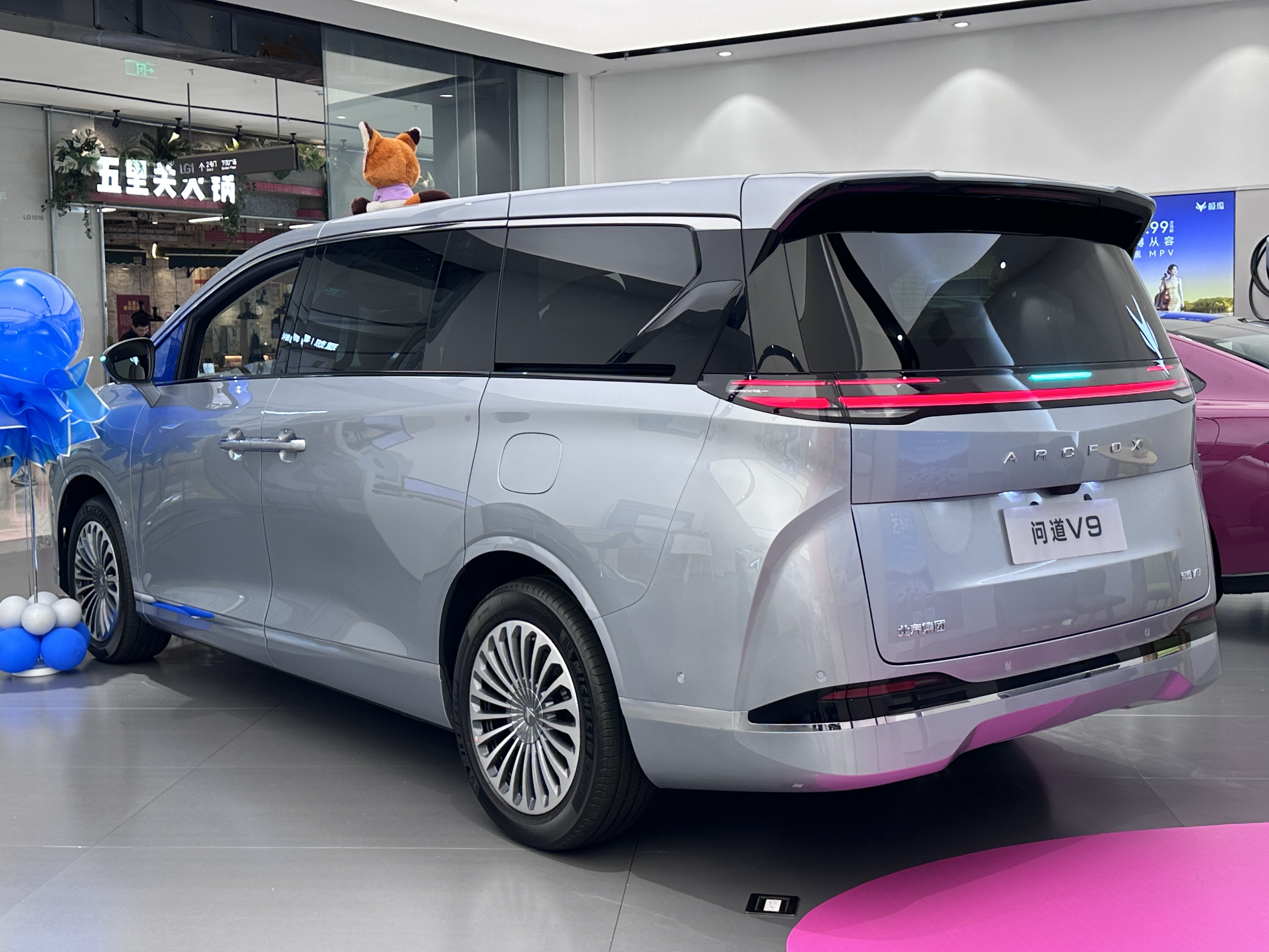
Rear view

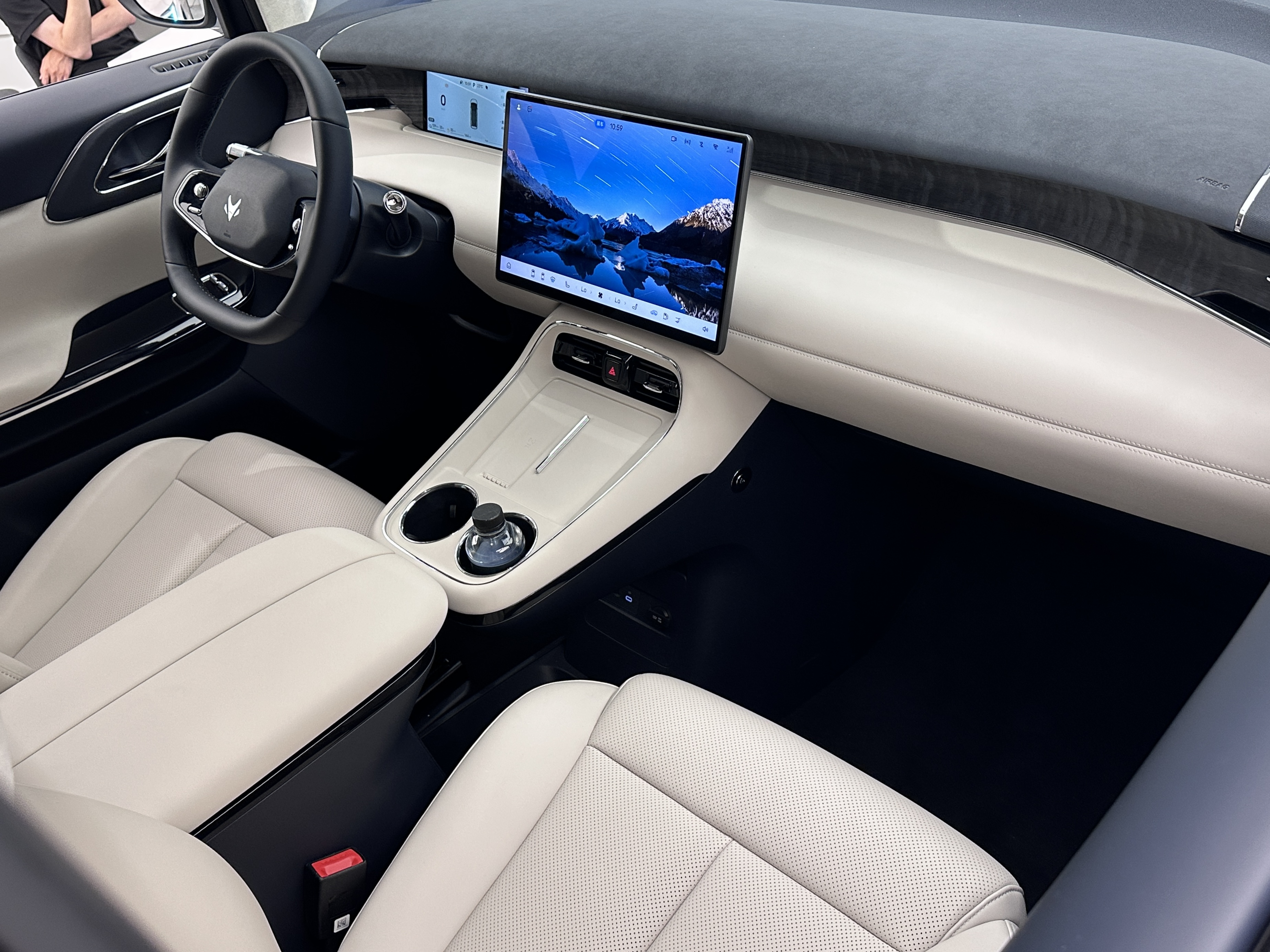
Interior

=== Design ===
The design of the Wendao V9 was previewed by the 77° Concept shown at Auto Shanghai 2025. The Wendao V9 uses Arcfox's ARC-FLOW design philosophy. The front uses a star ring-style light bar paired with dual air intakes. The second row uses sliding doors with traditional handles. Arcfox used a yacht-style design for the D-pillar. The back of the Wendao V9 uses a continuous light bar and a separate light above for autonomous driving.

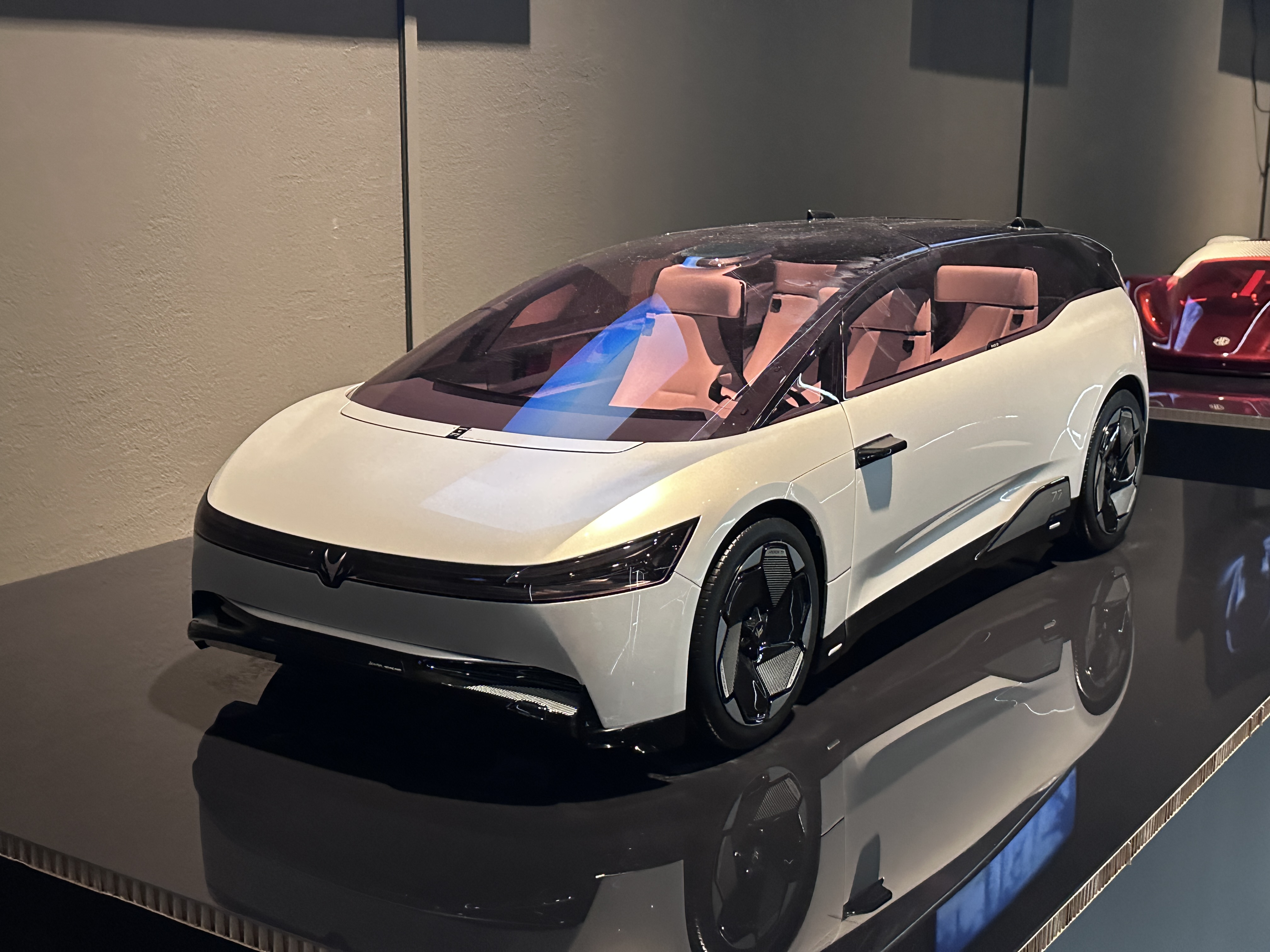
Arcfox 77° concept

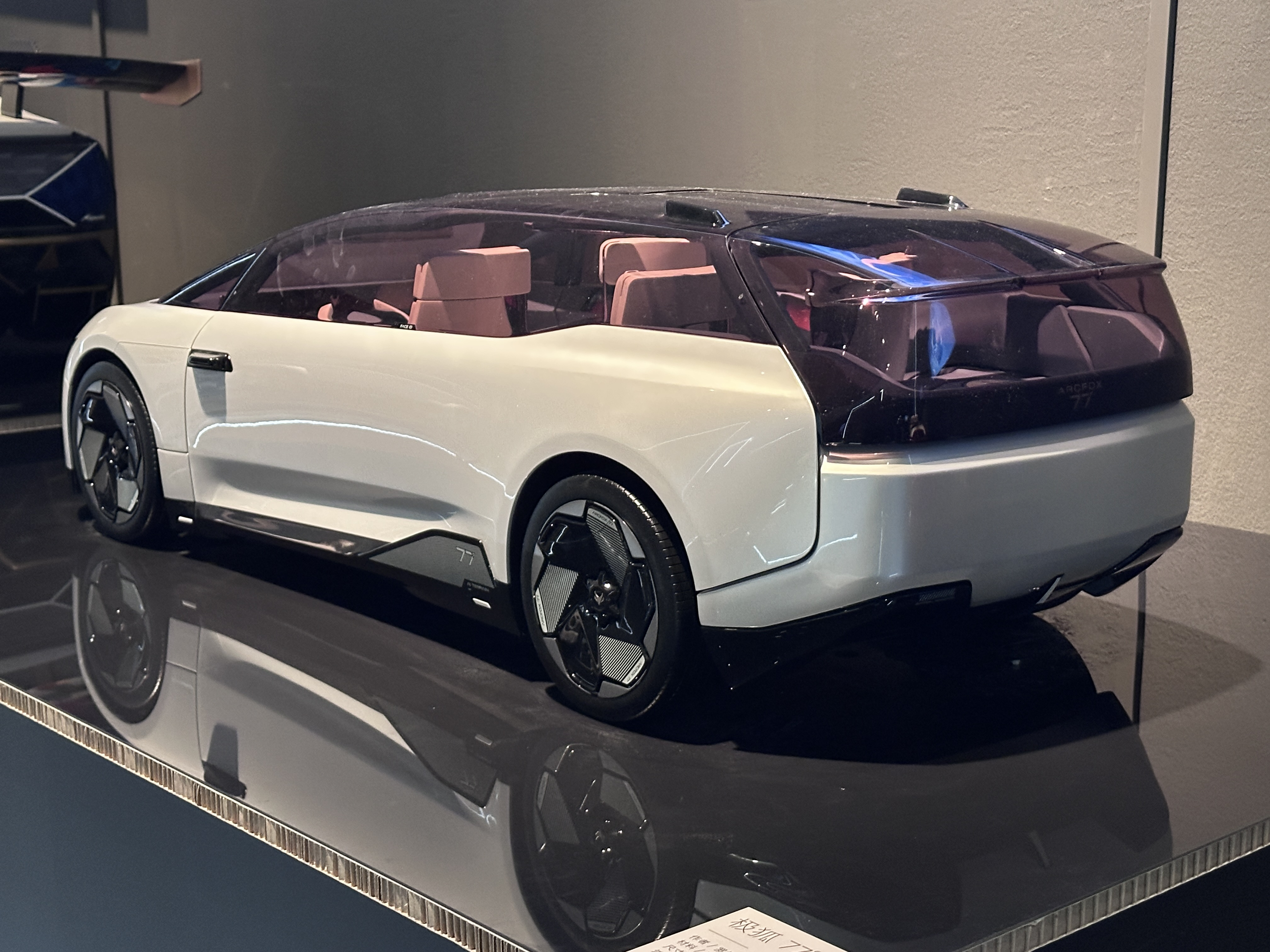
Rear view

=== Features ===
The Wendao V9 uses magnetorheological dampers in the suspension. It also uses an integrated roll cage. The Wendao V9 being the first minivan to utilize both technologies.

== Powertrain ==
The Wendao V9 uses a 1.5 liter turbocharged inline 4 petrol engine as a generator producing 158 horsepower. It uses an electric motor producing 304 horsepower. A lithium iron phosphate battery is also utilized, however the capacity of it is yet to be revealed. The range is expected to be around 932 miles (1,500 km).
