= Diar =

Iranian automobile manufacturer

Diar Motors
- Type: Private
- Industry: Automotive
- Founded: 2000
- Headquarters: Golpayegan, Esfahan Province, Iran
- Area served: Iran
- Products: Automotive goods
- Owner: Mammut Group
- Website: http://diar-khodro.com

Diar Automobile Company (Persian: دیار خودرو) is an automobile company based in Golpayegan, Iran. Established in 2000, the company manufacturers SUVs and pick-ups under license from China's Changcheng, also known as Great Wall Motor. Diar also manufactures their own vehicles. Their flagship vehicle, the Safir, is based on the Great Wall Wingle and shares its name with one of Iran's rockets.

== History ==
Sazehaye Khodro Diar Manufacturing Co. was established in 2000, for the production of vehicle body-pressed parts through investments made by the private sector. By installation and setting up 6 units of 500 to 2000 tons hydraulic and Heavy Stroke Presses in January 2003, the Company managed to obtain the Exploitation License for body-pressed parts.

In line with its developmental plans and recognizing vacant market capacity for pick-up and SUV in the country and in the region, this company studied the feasibility to co-operate with a few world large vehicle manufacturing companies in order to produce these products in Iran. The result of the study and negotiations with the candidate companies, led to the selection and conclusion of an agreement with Great Wall Motor of China. Following the agreement made with GWM Co. and having obtained the Establishment License for the production of 50,000 units of single and double cabin pick-ups as well as SUVs in 2004, the construction of a 50,000M² plant in an area of 140,000M² in Golpaigan township of Esfahan Province (golpayegan) has been started. Obtaining the Exploitation License and necessary permits from the Ministry of Industry and Mines, the Standard Bureau, the Environment Protection Organisation and other related organizations, Setad-e-Tabsareh 13 (13th. Note Headquarters) for instance, presently, as the first phase, through setting up of Final Painting Lines, assembling and testing of vehicle and by making use of CKD parts and partly procurement from local sources, has started the production and delivery of Diar single and double cabin pick-ups.

== Current Products ==
- Beijing U5 Plus sedan
- Beijing X55 crossover
- Beijing X7 crossover
- Beijing BJ30 crossover

== Former Products ==
- BAIC Sabrina hatchback
- BAIC Senova sedan
- Great Wall Deer pickup
- Great Wall Wingle 3 pickup
- Great Wall Wingle 5 pickup
- Great Wall Haval M4 crossover
- Great Wall Haval H6 crossover
