= Freedom (disambiguation) =

Freedom, generally, is the ability or right to change or act without constraint.

Freedom may also refer to:

== Philosophy ==
- Artistic freedom, freedom of expression and publication
- Autonomy, the capacity to make an informed, un-coerced decision
- Civil liberties, personal guarantees and freedoms that government cannot abridge without due process
- Freedom of association, an individual's right to join or leave groups voluntarily, the right of the group to take collective action to pursue the interests of its members, and the right of an association to accept or decline membership based on certain criteria
- Freedom of choice, an individual's opportunity and autonomy
- Freedom of speech, the right to communicate one's opinions and ideas
- Freedom of thought, the freedom of an individual to hold or consider a fact, viewpoint, or thought, independent of others' viewpoints
- Freethought, an epistemological viewpoint which holds that beliefs should not be formed on the basis of authority, tradition, revelation, or dogma, and that beliefs should instead be reached by other methods such as logic, reason, and empirical observation
- Free will, the ability to choose between courses of action
- Liberty, the ability to do as one pleases
- Moral responsibility, the status of deserving praise or blame for an act or omission
- Rights, legal, social, or ethical principles of freedom or entitlement

== Computing ==
- Freedom (application), a software utility designed to allow a person to block their own access to the Internet for a set period of time
- Freedom! (video game), a 1992 educational computer game on the history of slavery
- Internet freedom, an umbrella term that encompasses digital rights, freedom of information, the right to Internet access, freedom from Internet censorship, and net neutrality
- Software freedom, a social movement promoting the freedom to run, study and change software

== Transport ==
- Freedom Yachts, an American yacht builder and several of their models
- Freedom (yacht), a 12-metre class racing yacht and winner of the 1980 America's Cup
- Brutsche Freedom 40, an American homebuilt aircraft design
- Colyaer Freedom S100, a Spanish ultralight aircraft
- Freedom-class littoral combat ship, warships of the US Navy
- Freedom-class cruise ship, operated by Royal Caribbean International
- USS Freedom, any of three US Navy ships
- Freedom Ship, a concept for a floating city
- Pro-Composites Freedom, an American homebuilt aircraft design
- Space Station Freedom, an uncompleted NASA project
- Freedom Bridge (South Sudan), a bridge under construction in South Sudan
- Crew Dragon Freedom, a SpaceX crew capsule
- Space Reactor-1 Freedom, a proposed NASA nuclear powered spacecraft

== Automobiles ==
- Changhe Freedom, a microvan and a subcompact pickup truck
- Elation Freedom, an electric hypercar

== Places ==
=== United States ===
- Freedom, California
- Freedom, Georgia
- Freedom, Idaho and Wyoming
- Freedom, Indiana
- Freedom, Kentucky
- Freedom, Maine
- Freedom, Maryland
- Freedom, Michigan
- Freedom, Missouri
- Freedom, New Hampshire
- Freedom, Nebraska
- Freedom, New York
- Freedom, Ohio (disambiguation)
- Freedom, Oklahoma
- Freedom, Pennsylvania
- Freedom, Utah
- Freedom, Forest County, Wisconsin
- Freedom, Outagamie County, Wisconsin
- Freedom (community), Outagamie County, Wisconsin
- Freedom, Sauk County, Wisconsin
- Freedom County, Washington, an unrecognized county
- Freedom Township (disambiguation), several places

== Arts and entertainment ==
=== Books ===
- Freedom (Franzen novel), 2010, by Jonathan Franzen
- Freedom (Safire novel), 1987, by William Safire
- Freedom™, a 2010 novel by Daniel Suarez
- Freedom, original title of Freedom, Vol. 1: Freedom in the Making of Western Culture, a 1991 history by Orlando Patterson
- FREEDOM!, a 2014 philosophical treatise by Adam Kokesh
- Freedom (Junger book), a creative nonfiction book written by Sebastian Junger
- Freedom (Merkel book), an autobiography written by Angela Merkel

=== Film and television ===
- Freedom (Yoko Ono film), a 1970 short film
- Freedom (1982 film), an Australian film directed by Scott Hicks
- Freedom (2000 film), directed by Šarūnas Bartas
- Freedom (2001 film), an Argentine film
- Freedom (2014 film), an American film
- Freedom (2019 film), a Spanish film
- Freedom (2025 film), an Indian film
- Freedom (TV series), a 2000 television series
- "Freedom" (Don't Wait Up), a 1986 sitcom episode
- "Freedom" (Quantum Leap), a 1990 television episode
- "Freedom" (NCIS), a 2011 television episode
- "Freedom" (The Following), a 2014 episode of the psychological thriller
- Freedom Project, a Japanese promotional video animation series

=== Music ===
==== Albums ====
- Freedom (Akon album), 2008, or the title song
- Freedom (Amen Dunes album), 2018
- Freedom (Andy Griggs album), 2002
- Freedom (Darrell Evans album), 1998
- Freedom (Dragon Ash album), 2009
- Freedom (Eric Chou album), 2019
- Freedom (EP), 2021, by Justin Bieber, or the title song
- Freedom (Journey album), 2022
- Freedom (Kenny Burrell album), recorded 1963–1964, released 1980 and 2011
- Freedom (Mandisa album), 2009
- Freedom (Michael W. Smith album), 2000
- Freedom (Rebecca Ferguson album), 2013
- Freedom (Refused album), 2015
- Freedom (Neil Young album), 1989
- Freedom (Santana album), 1987
- Freedom (Sheena Easton album), 1997
- Freedom (Trey Eley & Matthew Shell album), 2012
- Freedom (White Heart album), 1989
- Freedom (Yothu Yindi album), 1993
- Freedom, 2016, by Baby Woodrose

==== Songs ====
- "Freedom" (Alice Cooper song), 1987, from Raise Your Fist and Yell
- "Freedom" (Beyoncé song), 2016, from Lemonade
- "Freedom" (DJ BoBo song), 1994, from There Is a Party
- "Freedom" (Erasure song), 2000, from Loveboat
- "Freedom" (Faith Kakembo song), 2022
- "Freedom" (Girl Next Door song), 2010, theme song of Japanese drama Jotei Kaoruko
- "Freedom" (Isley Brothers song), 1970, from Get into Something
- "Freedom" (Jimi Hendrix song), 1971, from The Cry of Love
- "Freedom" (Kygo song) feat. Zak Abel, 2020 tropical house single
- "Freedom" (London Boys song), 1990, from Sweet Soul Music
- "Freedom" (Mariam Shengelia song), 2025
- "Freedom" (Nicki Minaj song), 2012, from Pink Friday: Roman Reloaded
- "Freedom" (Noiseworks song), 1990, from Love Versus Money
- "Freedom" (Paul McCartney song), 2001, from Driving Rain
- "Freedom" (Pharrell Williams song), 2015
- "Freedom" (Rage Against the Machine song), 1994
- "Freedom" (Reba McEntire song), 2019
- "Freedom" (Robert Miles song), 1997, from 23am
- "Freedom" (Solange song), from the 2004 comedy film Johnson Family Vacation
- "Freedom" (The Sons of Champlin song), 1969, from Loosen Up Naturally
- "Freedom" (Sugababes song), 2011
- "Freedom" (Wham! song), 1984, from Make It Big
- "Freedom" (Theme from Panther), 1995, from the film Panther
- "Freedun", 2016, by M.I.A.
- "Freedom", by Amos Lee from Supply and Demand
- "Freedom", by Anthony Hamilton and Elayna Boynton from the Django Unchained soundtrack album
- "Freedom", an alternate name for the Aretha Franklin song "Think (Aretha Franklin song)"
- "Freedom", by Band-Maid from Brand New Maid
- "Freedom", by Buffalo from Volcanic Rock
- "Freedom", by Cathedral from Caravan Beyond Redemption
- "Freedom", by Charles Mingus from The Complete Town Hall Concert
- "Freedom", by Dan Balan from Freedom, Part 1
- "Freedom", by David Guetta from 7
- "Freedom", by Deep Purple from the 25th anniversary reissue of Fireball
- "Freedom", by Dierks Bentley from Black
- "Freedom", by Estelle from The 18th Day
- "Freedom", by Foxy Shazam from The Church of Rock and Roll
- "Freedom", by Gardenian from Two Feet Stand
- "Freedom", by Girls' Generation from Forever 1
- "Freedom", by Kesha from Period
- "Freedom", by Maher Zain from Forgive Me
- "Freedom", by Mary Travers
- "Freedom", by Nantucket from Nantucket V
- "Freedom", by Nebula from To the Center
- "Freedom", an improvised song by Richie Havens based on "Sometimes I Feel Like a Motherless Child", performed at the 1969 Woodstock Festival
- "Freedom! '90", by George Michael, also covered by Robbie Williams, not to be confused with the unrelated similarly titled Wham song
- "Freedom", a single released by Grandmaster Flash and the Furious Five in 1980
- "Freedom" by Japanese metal band Blood Stain Child from Mozaiq
- "Freedom Come, Freedom Go", 1971 hit single by The Fortunes
- "Freedom", a 2024 single performed by Stan Bush

==== Other uses in music ====
- Freedom (band), a psychedelic rock band
- Freedom (Canadian band) aka Freedom North, a Canadian rock band from the 1970s
- Freedom (concert), 2021, concert by Filipina singer Regine Velasquez
- Freedom Records, a jazz label
- USA Freedom Kids, American musical group

=== Sculptures ===
- Freedom (Frudakis), 2000, by Zenos Frudakis in Philadelphia, Pennsylvania, US
- Freedom (Tibor), 1985, by Alfred Tibor in Columbus, Ohio, US
- Statue of Freedom, 1863, by Thomas Crawford atop the dome of the US Capitol
- Miss Freedom, 1889 statue on the dome of the Georgia State Capitol (US)
- Freedom Sculpture, 2017, by Cecil Balmond in Los Angeles, California, US
- Freedom (statue), a statue of Charlie Kirk built by Sergio Furnari

=== Other arts ===
- Freedom: The Underground Railroad, a 2013 board game about the Abolitionist Movement in the 1800s in the US
- Chris Pape, known as Freedom, a 20th-century American graffiti artist
- Freedom, a Bald Eagle from the 1985 TV series G.I. Joe: A Real American Hero

== Mathematics and physics ==
- Asymptotic freedom, a concept in particle physics
- Degrees of freedom, the number of parameters of a system that can vary independently
- Six degrees of freedom, describing the motion of an object in 3-dimensional space
- Systolic freedom, a concept in mathematics

== Press ==
- Freedom of the press, the freedom of communication and expression through various media
- Freedom Communications, a privately held national media company headquartered in Irvine, California
- Freedom (magazine), a Scientology publication
- Freedom (British newspaper), an anarchist newspaper
- Freedom (American newspaper), an African-American newspaper
- Freedom Press, a British anarchist publishing house

== Sports ==
- Florence Freedom, a baseball team in the Frontier League now known as the Florence Y'alls
- Washington Freedom (cricket), a team in Major League Cricket
- Washington Freedom (soccer), a defunct women's professional soccer team
- Freedom Chiya (born 1979), South African beach volleyball player
- Freedom (gamer), stage name of StarCraft player Chang Youngsuk
- Enes Kanter Freedom (born 1992), former professional basketball player

== Organizations ==
- Freedom (Azerbaijan), an electoral alliance in Azerbaijan
- Freedom (charity), a UK charity dedicated to helping victims of forced marriage
- Freedom Fuel, US fuel retailer
- Freedom Fuels, Australian fuel retailer
- Freedom House, a non-profit organization group in Washington, D.C., best known for political advocacy surrounding issues of democracy, political freedom, and human rights
- Freedom, Inc., a 1961 political organization of African-American political activists in Kansas City, Missouri

== Other uses ==
- Freedom in the World, a yearly survey and report by the U.S.-based non-governmental organization Freedom House that measures the degree of civil liberties and political rights in every nation and significant related and disputed territories around the world
- Freedom of the City, an honour bestowed by a municipality upon a valued member of the community or an important visitor
- Freedom Furniture, a furniture retailer in Australia and New Zealand

== See also ==
- List of freedom indices
- Free (disambiguation)
- Freed (disambiguation)
- FREEДОМ
