= Free =

Free commonly refers to:

- Freedom, the ability to act or change without constraint or restriction
  - Emancipate, attaining civil and political rights or equality
- Free of charge, something provided at no cost

Free may also refer to:

== Computing ==
- Free (programming), a function that releases dynamically allocated memory for reuse
- Free software, software usable and distributable with few restrictions and no payment
- 🆓, an emoji in the Enclosed Alphanumeric Supplement block

== Mathematics ==
- Free object
  - Free abelian group
  - Free algebra
  - Free group
  - Free module
  - Free semigroup
- Free variable

== People ==
- Free (surname)
- Free (rapper) (born 1968), or Free Marie, American rapper and media personality
- Abbie Hoffman, activist and writer, known by the pseudonym "Free"
- Free, lead singer and lyricist of American band FreeSol (formed 2003)

== Arts and media ==
=== Fictional characters ===
- Free (Soul Eater), a werewolf, in the 2004–2013 manga book series and the 2008–2009 anime television series

=== Movies ===
- Free (film), a 2001 American dramedy
- Les Libres or The Free Ones, a 2020 Canadian documentary

=== Television ===
- Free!, a Japanese anime series starting in 2013
- "Free" (Desperate Housewives), a television episode

=== Music ===
==== Bands and groups ====
- Free (band), an English rock band 1968–1973
- Free!!, a Spanish mákina band 1994–2004
- The Free, a German eurodance band 1994–1999
- Have Heart, re-formed as Free since 2009, an American straight edge band

==== Albums ====
- Free (Airto album) or the title song, 1972
- Free (Benny Golson album), 1963
- Free (Bonfire album) or the title song, 2003
- Free (Brad Johner album) or the title song, 2003
- Free (Chico DeBarge album) or the title song, 2003
- Free (Cody Simpson album) or the title song, 2015
- Free (Concrete Blonde album), 1989
- Free (Dana International album) or the title song, 1999
- Free (David Garrett album), 2007
- Free (Gavin DeGraw album) or the title song, 2009
- Free (For Real album) or the title song, 1996
- Free (Free album), 1969
- Free (Iggy Pop album) or the title song, 2019
- Free (Kate Ryan album) or the title song, 2008
- Free (Kid Cudi album), 2025
- Free (Jann Arden album) or the title song, 2009
- Free (Kierra Sheard album) or the title song, 2011
- Free (Lisa Shaw album) or the title song, 2009
- Free (Mao Abe album) or the title song (see below), 2009
- Free (Marcus Miller album), 2007
- Free (Negativland album), 1993
- Free (OSI album) or the title song, 2006
- Free (The Party album) or the title song, 1992
- Free (Prince Markie Dee album) or the title song, 1992
- Free (Rick Astley album), 1991
- Free (Rivermaya album), 2000
- Free (Twin Atlantic album) or the title song, 2011
- Free (Virtue album) or the title song, 2003
- Free... (EP), by Acid King, or the title song, 2001
- Free (Based Freestyles Mixtape), by Lil B and Chance the Rapper, 2015
- Free, by Hundredth, 2015
- free*, by Jim's Big Ego, 2008
- Free, by Libera, 2004
- Free, by Planetshakers, 2008
- Free, by Stone, 1992

==== Songs ====
- "Free" (Broods song), 2016
- "Free" (Calvin Harris and Ellie Goulding song), 2024
- "Free" (Chicago song), 1971
- "Free" (Dara Maclean song), 2011
- "Free" (Deniece Williams song), 1976
- "Free" (Erika song), 2007
- "Free" (Estelle song), 2004
- "Free" (Florence and the Machine song), 2022
- "Free" (Haley Reinhart song), 2012
- "Free" (Mao Abe song), 2008
- "Free" (Mýa song), 2001
- "Free" (Natalia Kills song), 2011
- "Free" (Pete Murray song), 2011
- "Free" (Phish song), 1996
- "Free" (Rudimental song), 2013
- "Free" (Sarah Brightman song), 2003
- "Free" (Train song), 1998
- "Free" (Ultra Naté song), 1997
- "Free" (Zac Brown Band song), 2010
- "Free", by 6lack from Free 6lack, 2016
- "Free", by Alesha Dixon from Fired Up, 2006
- "Free", by Bacon Popper, 1998
- "Free", by Blue October UK from One Day Silver, One Day Gold, 2005
- "Free", by the Cars from Move Like This, 2011
- "Free", by Cat Power from You Are Free, 2003
- "Free", by Charlie Puth, 2020
- "Free", by Chris Madlin and by Crush 40 from the video game Sonic Free Riders, 2010
- "Free", by Dani Harmer, the theme from Dani's House, 2008
- "Free", by Depeche Mode, B-side of "Precious", 2005
- "Free", by Destiny's Child from Destiny Fulfilled, 2004
- "Free", by DJ Quicksilver, 1997
- "Free", by Donna De Lory from Bliss, 2000
- "Free", by Ejae and Andrew Choi from the KPop Demon Hunters film soundtrack, 2025
- "Free", by Enrique Iglesias from 7, 2003
- "Free", by Ginny Owens from Without Condition, 1999
- "Free", by Graffiti6 from Colours, 2010
- "Free", by H.E.R. from H.E.R., 2017
- "Free", by Jaguar Wright from Divorcing Neo 2 Marry Soul, 2005
- "Free", by Jeremy Camp from Reckless, 2013
- "Free", by Jon Secada, 2006
- "Free", by Little Big Town from The Breaker, 2017
- "Free", by Louis the Child from Here for Now, 2020
- "Free", by the Martinis from Empire Records: The Soundtrack, 1995
- "Free", by Michelle Williams from Journey to Freedom, 2014
- "Free", by Mikolas Josef, 2016
- "Free", by Nakatomi, 1995
- "Free", by Parcels, 2021
- "Free", by Pink from Try This, 2003
- "Free", by Plumb from Beautiful Lumps of Coal, 2003
- "Free", by Powerman 5000 from Transform, 2003
- "Free", by Primal Scream from Give Out but Don't Give Up, 1994
- "Free", by Prince from 1999, 1982
- "Free", by Quiet Riot from Rehab, 2006
- "Free", by Rose Gray from Louder Please, 2025
- "Free", by Stephanie Mills from Born for This!, 2004
- "Free", by Stevie Wonder from Characters, 1987
- "Free", by Stryper from To Hell with the Devil, 1986
- "Free", by VAST from Music for People, 2000
- "Free", by Why Don't We, 2016
- "Free", by Will Downing, 1988
- "Free", by Yu Yamada, the ending theme for the anime Basquash!, 2009
- "Free", written by Irving Berlin

=== Literature ===
- Free (Anderson book), a 2009 economics book by Chris Anderson
- Free (Ypi book), a 2021 memoir by Lea Ypi

== Organizations ==
- Fight Repression of Erotic Expression, a University of Minnesota student group, now the Queer Student Cultural Center
- Foundation for Rational Economics and Education, a libertarian think tank founded by Ron Paul
- Foundation for Research on Economics and the Environment, a think tank that promotes free-market environmentalism
- Free (ISP), a French internet service provider
- Free Airlines, a Kinshasa Congolese air operator

== Other uses ==
- Free (cigarette), from Brazil
- Voyah Free, a hybrid/electric car produced since 2021 onwards by Dongfeng Motor Corporation
- Die Freien, also known as The Free [Ones], a 19th-century circle of philosophers formed at the University of Berlin
- Bound and free morphemes, in linguistics

== See also ==
- Freedom (disambiguation)
- Freed (disambiguation)
- Gratis (disambiguation)
- Libre (disambiguation)
