= WZZG =

Coordinates: 33°04′38″N 83°08′48″W

- Toomsboro, Georgia; United States
- Broadcast area: Milledgeville, Georgia
- Frequency: 91.9 MHz

Ownership
- Owner: Augusta Radio Fellowship Institute, Inc

Technical information
- Facility ID: 121765
- Class: A
- ERP: 2,300 watts
- HAAT: 146 meters (479 ft)

WZZG (91.9 FM) was a radio station broadcasting a Contemporary Christian Music format, licensed to Toomsboro, Georgia, United States. The station served the Milledgeville, Georgia area and was owned by Augusta Radio Fellowship Institute, Inc.

The station's license was cancelled by the Federal Communications Commission on August 24, 2016, due to WZZG having been silent for more than twelve months (since March 12, 2015).
