= Peter Little =

American politician (1775–1830)

Peter Little (December 11, 1775 – February 5, 1830) was a U.S. representative from Maryland.

== Biography ==
Born in Petersburg, Pennsylvania, Little attended the common schools. He initially worked as a watchmaker, until he moved to Freedom, Maryland and engaged in agricultural pursuits. He served as member of the Maryland House of Delegates in 1806 and 1807.

Little was elected as a Republican to the Twelfth Congress, where he served from March 4, 1811, to March 3, 1813. He was not a candidate for renomination in 1812. During the War of 1812, Little was commissioned colonel of the Thirty-eighth Maryland Infantry and served from May 19, 1813, to June 15, 1815.

In 1817, Peter and his wife Catharine had a son named Lewis Henry Little who went on to be a Brigadier General in the American Civil War.

After the War, Little was elected as a Democratic-Republican to the Fourteenth Congress to fill the vacancy caused by the resignation of William Pinkney. He was reelected as a Democratic-Republican to the Fifteenth, Sixteenth, and Seventeenth Congresses, as a Jackson Republican to the Eighteenth, and as an Adams candidate to the Nineteenth and Twentieth Congresses, and served from September 2, 1816, to March 3, 1829. In Congress, Little served as chairman of the Committee on Accounts (Fourteenth and Fifteenth Congresses), and as a member of the Committee on Pensions and Revolutionary Claims (Eighteenth and Nineteenth Congresses), the Committee on Revolutionary Claims (Nineteenth Congress), and the Committee on Expenditures in the Department of the Navy (Twentieth Congress). He declined to be a candidate for renomination.

After his tenure in Congress, Little served as judge of the orphans' court of Baltimore County. He died in Freedom, Maryland, is interred in Freedom Methodist Episcopal Cemetery, near Eldersburg, Maryland.

U.S. House of Representatives
Preceded by Nicholas Ruxton Moore	Member of the U.S. House of Representatives from Maryland's 5th congressional district 1811–1813	Succeeded by Nicholas Ruxton Moore
Preceded by William Pinkney	Member of the U.S. House of Representatives from Maryland's 5th congressional district 1816–1829	Succeeded by Elias Brown and Benjamin Chew Howard
