= Elation Freedom Iconic Collection =

Overview
- Manufacturer: Elation Motors
- Production: 2022–

Body and chassis
- Class: Sports car
- Body style: 2-door coupé
- Layout: 4-wheel drive
- Doors: Scissor

Powertrain
- Engine: 5.2-liter naturally aspirated V10
- Power output: >750 hp
- Transmission: 7-speed dual-clutch automatic

Dimensions
- Wheelbase: 2,700 mm
- Length: 4,495 mm
- Width: 2,000 mm
- Height: 1,055 mm (41.5 in)
- Curb weight: 1,290 kg (2,840 lb)

The Elation Freedom Iconic Collection is a bespoke sports car manufactured by California-based automobile manufacturer Elation Motors. Unveiled to the public in mid-November 2020, it is the second car built by the brand.

== Specifications ==
The Freedom Iconic Collection is powered by a 5.2-liter naturally aspirated V10 with a similar powertrain setup as a Lamborghini Huracan or Audi R8, with a power output of greater than 750 hp. The car is claimed to go from 0-60 mph in 2.5 seconds, with an electronically limited top speed of 240 mph. The car will feature a 7-speed dual-clutch automatic transmission.

== Design ==
The Freedom Iconic Collection, like its electric-powered twin, was designed with the intent to be a luxury hypercar. The hardware for the Freedom will sit in a lightweight carbon-fiber monocoque structure, also featuring an F1-style pushrod suspension, with the overall low profile allowing for a low drag coefficient of 0.28 Cd.

== Unveiling and production ==
The Freedom Iconic Collection will first be unveiled at the 2022 Geneva International Motor Show alongside its electric-powered twin, and production will begin after the debut if there is enough demand, building no more than 25 examples each year, each priced at 2.3 million each.
