= Changhe Freedom =

Jiangxi-Changhe Freedom
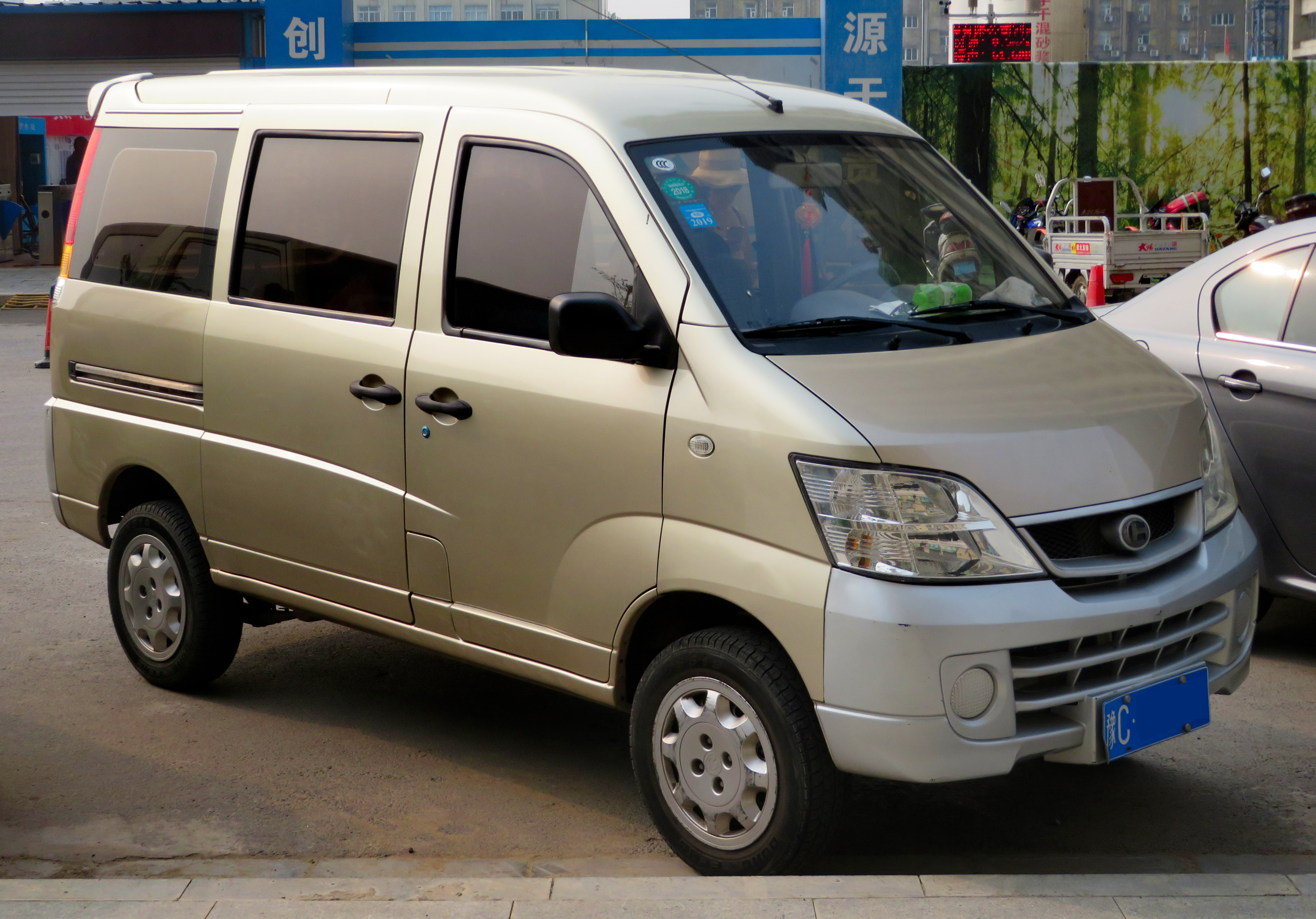

Overview
- Manufacturer: Changhe
- Also called: Thaco Towner (Vietnam)
- Production: 2007–2014; 2014–2022 (Vietnam)
- Assembly: China; Vietnam (THACO)

Body and chassis
- Class: Microvan
- Body style: Microvan pickup truck

Powertrain
- Engine: 1.0L I4
- Transmission: 5 speed manual

Dimensions
- Wheelbase: 2,405 mm (94.7 in)
- Length: 3,868 mm (152.3 in)
- Width: 1,528 mm (60.2 in)
- Height: 1,848 mm (72.8 in)
- Curb weight: 985 kg (2,172 lb)–1,030 kg (2,270 lb)

Chronology
- Predecessor: Changhe Haitun

The Changhe Freedom (福瑞达) is a five- to eight-seater Microvan and a two- to five- seater pickup truck made by Changhe. Originally launched as a cheap microvan for third to fourth tier cities, the microvan later spawned more premium passenger models and later developed into a compact MPV product series spawning a variety of vehicles including the Changhe Freedom M50, Changhe Freedom M60 and Changhe Freedom M70.

== Overview ==
The Changhe Freedom was originally launched as a cargo-focused microvan. The purpose could be seen from the design, with the tail lamps located on the rear bumper and providing a maximum tailgate dimension for cargo loading and unloading. Later models were redesigned to fit the tail lamps on the D-pillars which is a design closer to passenger vehicles and MPVs.

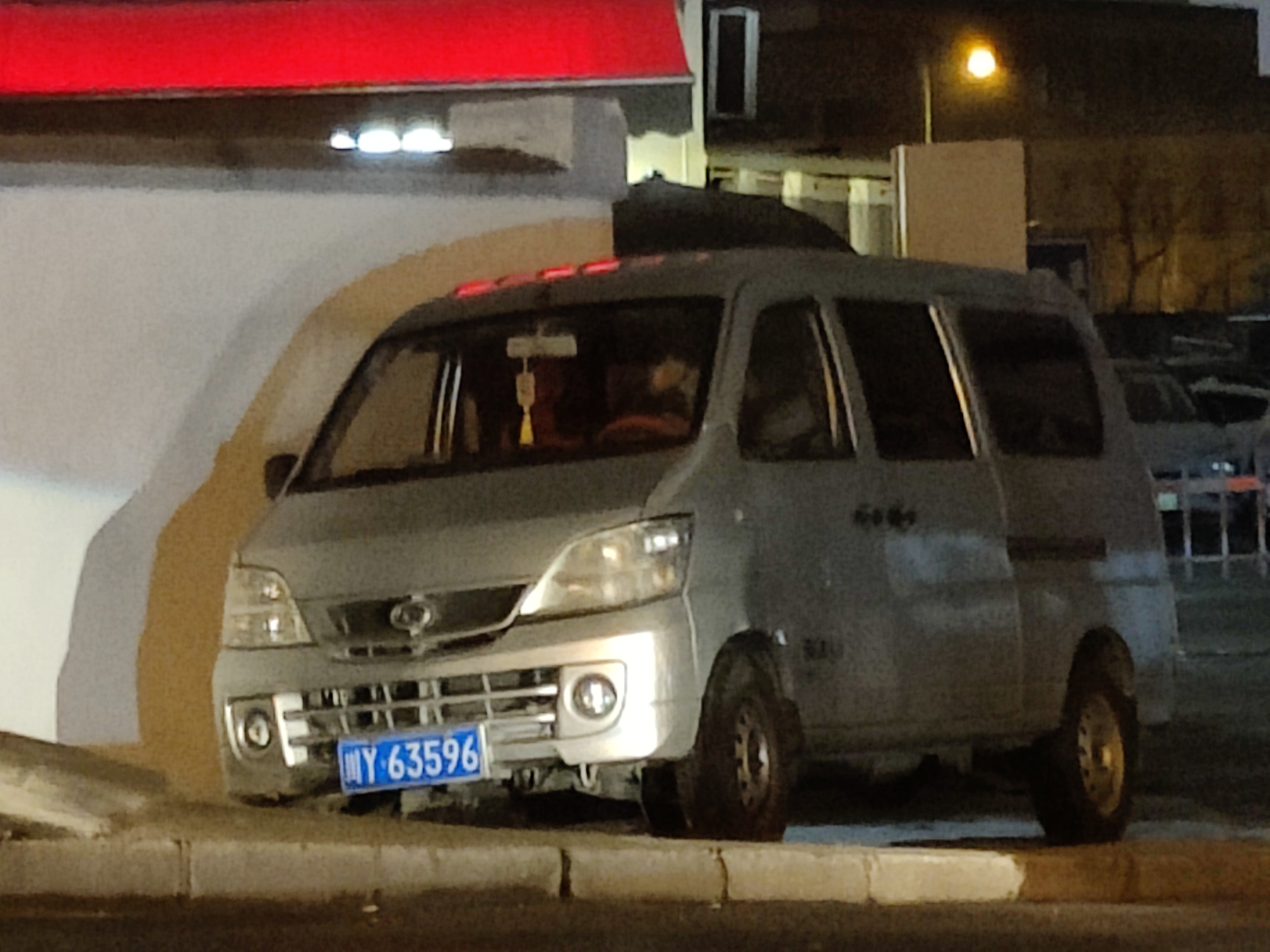
Early example of the Changhe Freedom microvan

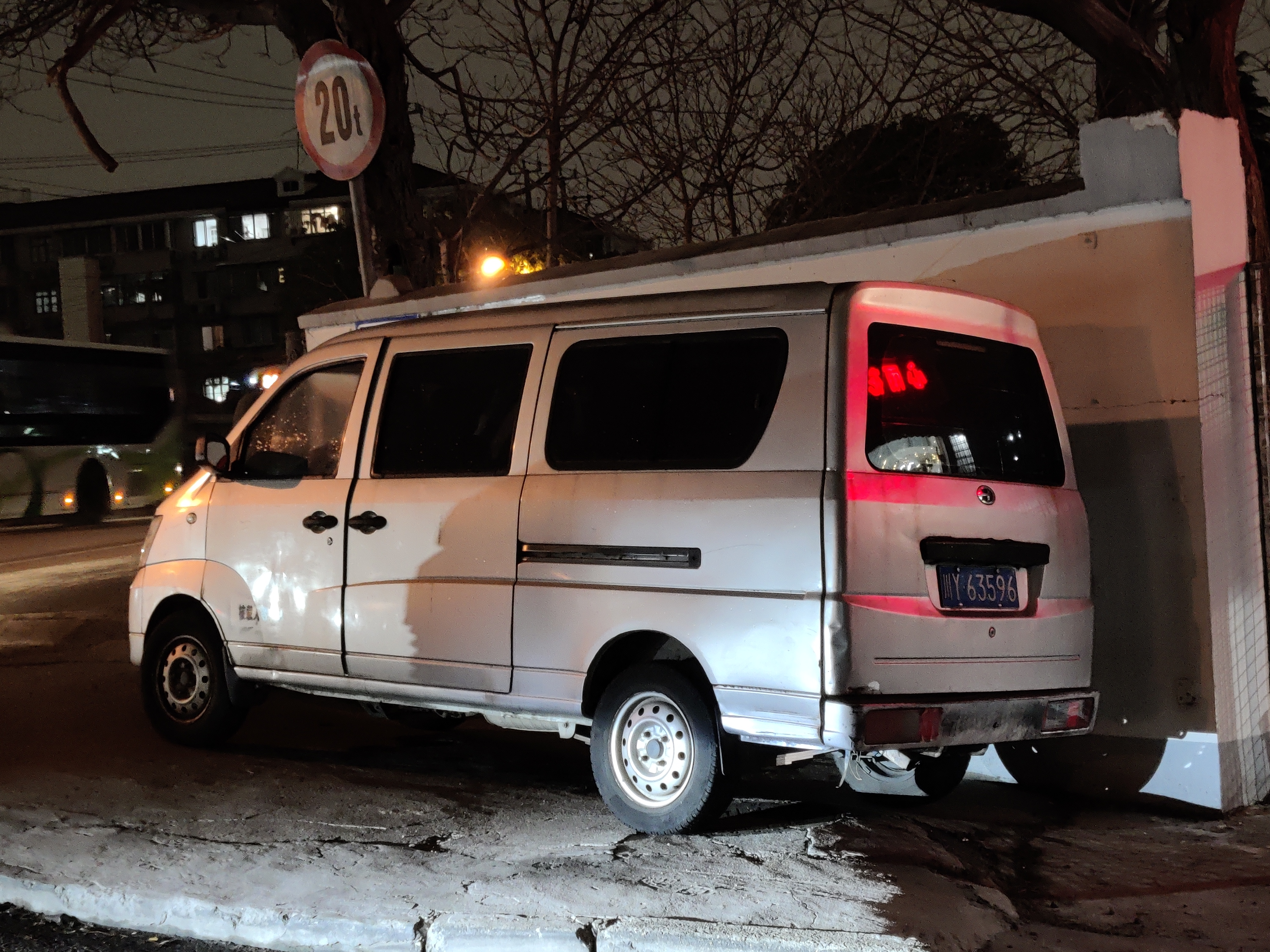
Early example of the Changhe Freedom microvan (rear quarter)

The engine option for the Changhe Freedom includes a 1.0 liter inline-four engine producing 60hp and a 1.0 liter inline-four engine producing 95hp, both mated to a 5 speed manual transmission.

Prices of the Changhe Freedom ranges from 28,800 to 47,800 yuan before the model was discontinued.

The model was offered in Vietnam as Thaco Towner since 2014 and was sold alongside the Suzuki Carry-based Thaco Towner that was offered with smaller engine. It was offered in both microvan and pickup truck variants. It was already discontinued as of 2025, replaced by the newer Changan-based model.

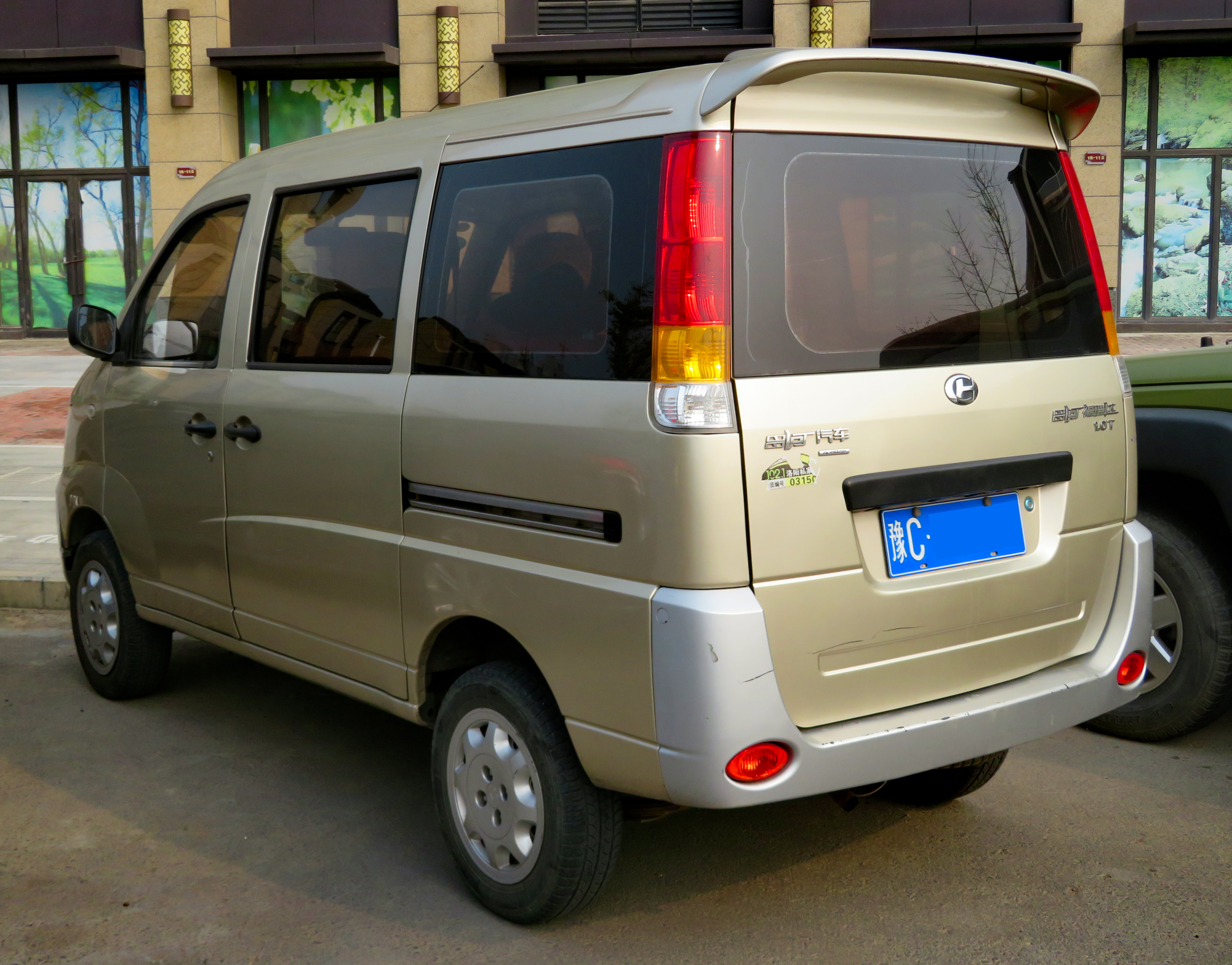
2010 Jiangxi-Changhe Freedom 1.0T rear quarter

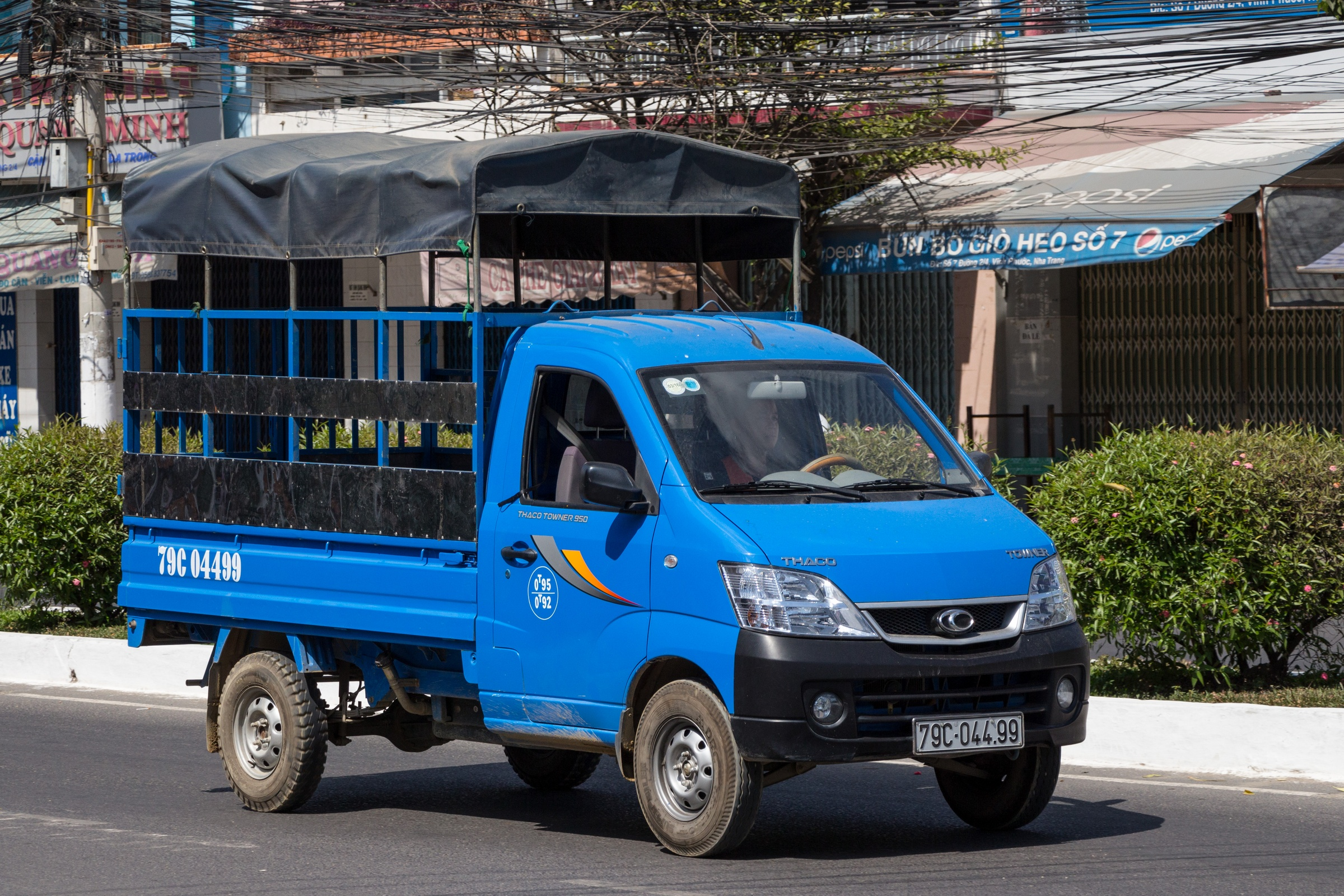
Thaco Towner 950 (Vietnam)

== Changhe Freedom K21 and K22 ==
The Changhe Freedom K21 and K22 are the pickup truck variants of the Changhe Freedom microvan, with the K21 being the single cab and the K22 being the crew cab model.

The post facelift Changhe Freedom K21 was priced from 37,400 to 48,800 yuan, while the post facelift Changhe Freedom K22 was priced from 39,400 to 51,300 yuan.

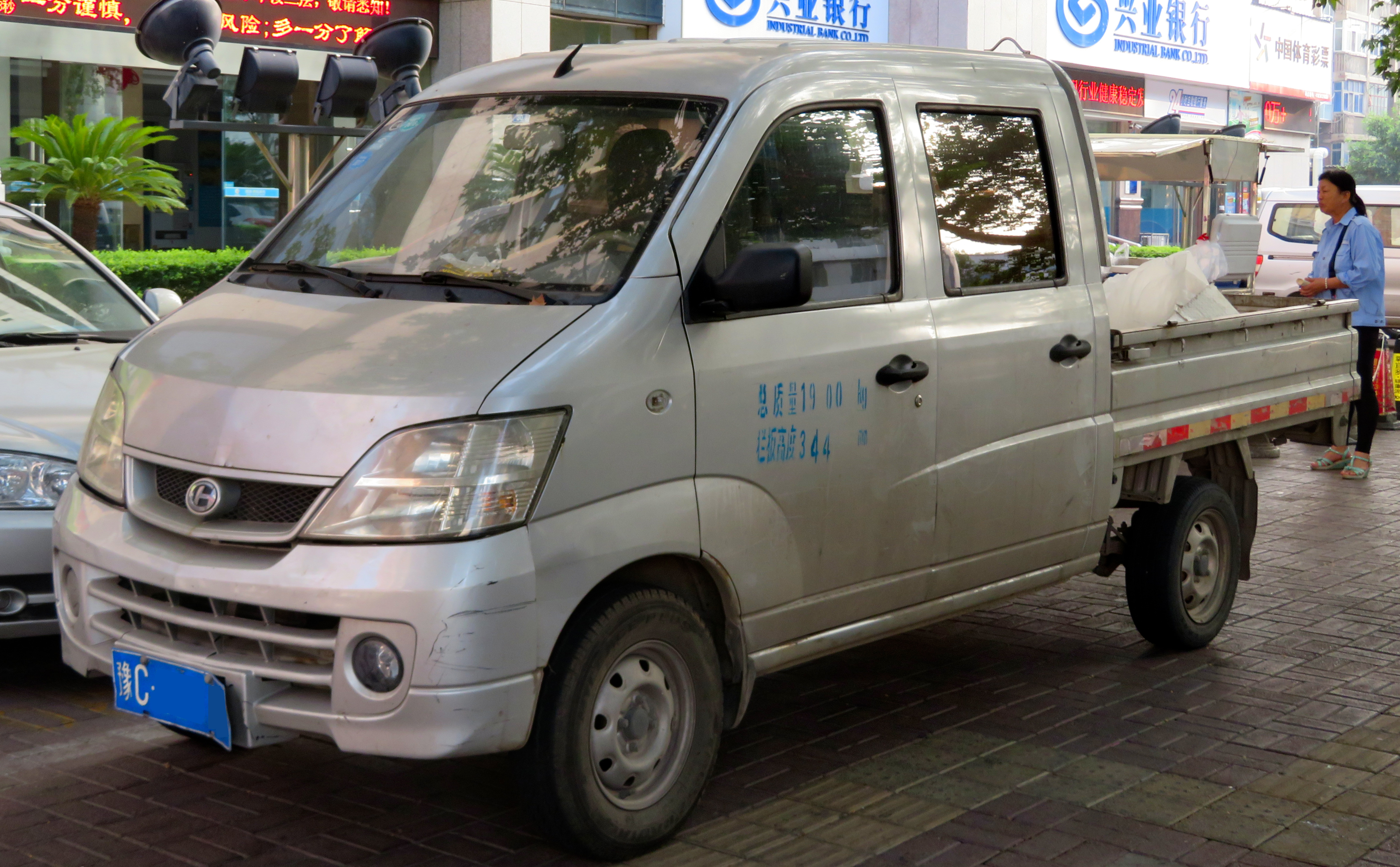
Changhe Freedom K22 front quarter

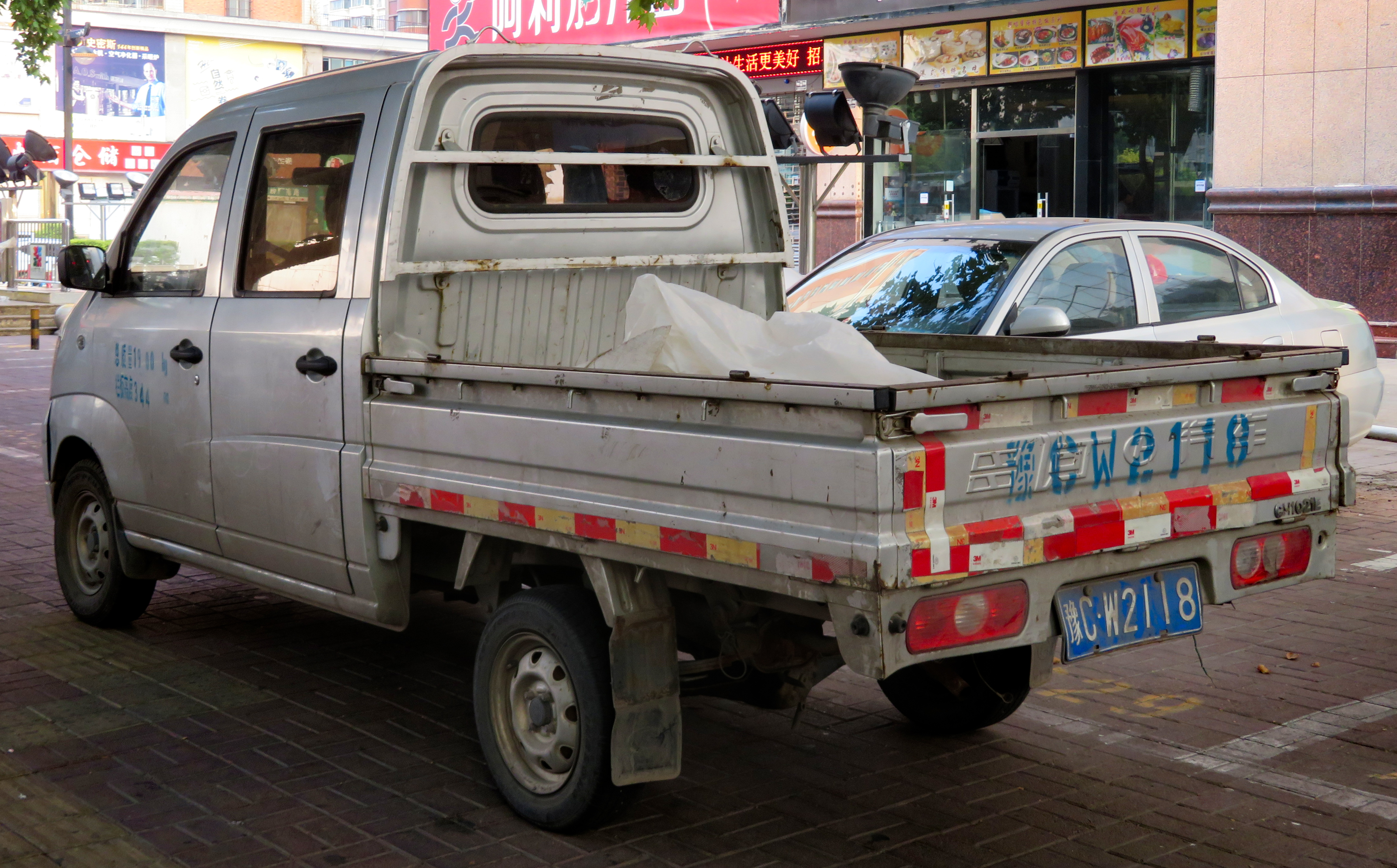
Changhe Freedom K22 rear quarter
