= Changhe Haitun =

2005 Jiangxi-Changhe Haitun CH6370
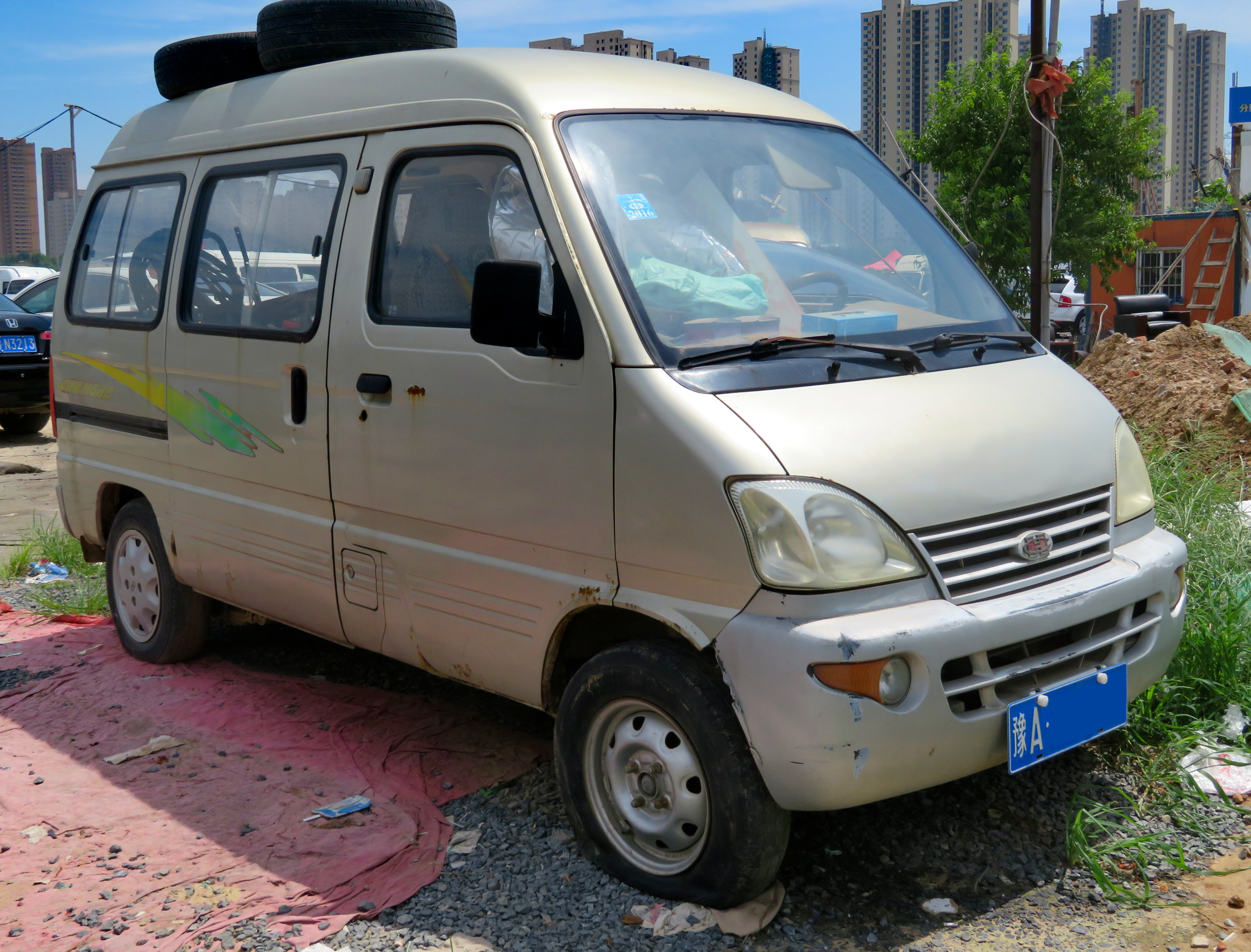

Overview
- Manufacturer: Changhe
- Also called: Changhe CH6370A; Changhe CH6370C
- Production: 2002–2007

Body and chassis
- Class: Microvan
- Body style: Microvan pickup truck

Powertrain
- Engine: 1.0L I4
- Transmission: 5 speed manual

Dimensions
- Wheelbase: 2,405 mm (94.7 in)
- Length: 3,695 mm (145.5 in)
- Width: 1,395–1,410 mm (54.9–55.5 in)
- Height: 1,940 mm (76.4 in)
- Curb weight: 960 kg (2,120 lb)–1,030 kg (2,270 lb)

Chronology
- Predecessor: Changhe Junma (CH6353)
- Successor: Changhe Freedom

The Changhe Haitun (海豚) is a 5 to 8 seater microvan built and sold in China by the Chinese automaker Changhe.

== Overview ==
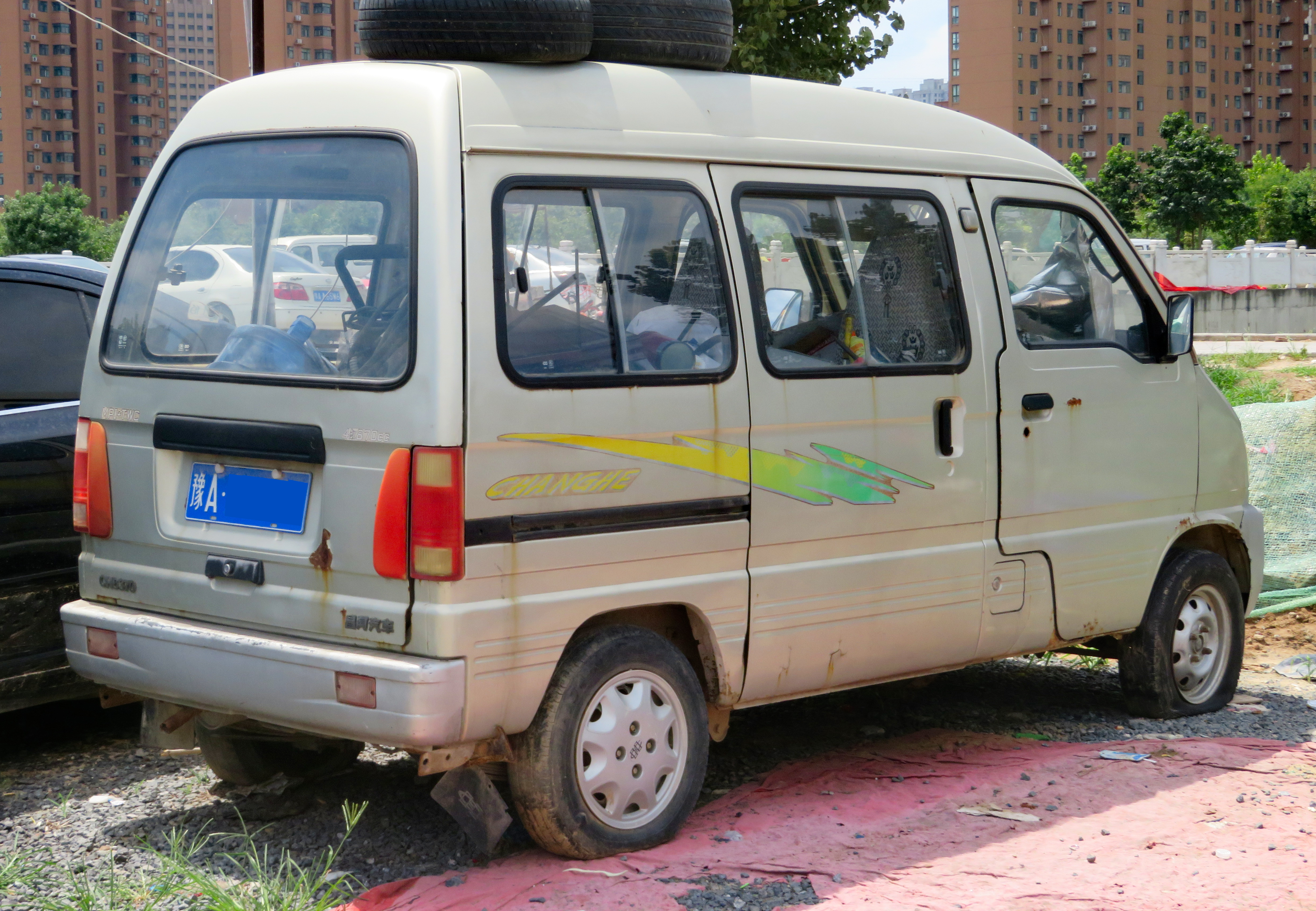
2005 Jiangxi-Changhe Haitun CH6370 rear quarter

Based on the predecessing cab-over „Changhe Junma CH6353“ series, the Changhe Haitun has the front axle moved forward while the body behind the B-pillars remained the same.

The engine for the „Changhe Haitun CH6370C“ is a 1051cc inline-four engine producing 38.5kW and the engine for the „Changhe Haitun CH6370A“ is a 970cc inline-four engine producing 35kW, both mated to a 5 speed manual transmission.
