= Nicholas R. Moore =

American politician

Nicholas Ruxton Moore

Member of the U.S. House of Representatives from Maryland's 5th district
- In office March 4, 1803 – March 3, 1811
- Preceded by: Samuel Smith
- Succeeded by: Peter Little
- In office March 4, 1813 – March 3, 1815
- Preceded by: Peter Little
- Succeeded by: Samuel Smith

Personal details
- Born: July 21, 1756 Baltimore, Province of Maryland, British America
- Died: October 7, 1816 (aged 60) Baltimore, Maryland, U.S.
- Resting place: Ruxton, Maryland, U.S.
- Party: Democratic-Republican

Nicholas Ruxton Moore (July 21, 1756 – October 7, 1816) was a U.S. Representative from Maryland.

Born near Baltimore in the Province of Maryland, Moore attended the common schools. He served as a member of Gist's Baltimore Independent Cadets and served throughout the greater part of the Revolutionary War, attaining the rank of captain. He served as the commander of the Baltimore Light Dragoons during the conflict. While in service, Moore wrote to George Washington to request an acceptance of his resignation from the Army; George Washington, through a letter written by James McHenry, granted permission for Moore to resign provided he had all his accounts settled with his regiment. He also took an active part in the suppression of the Whiskey Insurrection in 1794.

In 1794, Moore purchased a property north of Baltimore known as "Bosley's Adventure", a farm containing 350-acres located just north of the modern Lake Roland. The area in which his property was located is generally referred to as Ruxton-Riderwood, Maryland.

Moore served as a member of the Maryland House of Delegates in 1801 and 1802. In 1803, he was elected as a Democratic-Republican to the Eighth and to the three succeeding Congresses, serving from March 4, 1803, to March 3, 1811. During that time he served as an at-large delegate from 1803 to 1807 and represented the 5th district from 1807 to 1811. In Congress, he served as chairman of the Committee on Accounts (Tenth and Eleventh Congresses). He was an unsuccessful candidate for reelection to the Twelfth Congress. Moore was later appointed lieutenant colonel commandant of the sixth regimental cavalry district of Maryland on February 20, 1812.

In 1812, Moore was elected to the Thirteenth and Fourteenth Congresses and served from March 4, 1813, until his resignation in 1815 before the convening of the Fourteenth Congress. He again served as chairman of the Committee on Accounts (Thirteenth Congress). He died in Baltimore.

U.S. House of Representatives
Preceded by Samuel Smith	Member of the U.S. House of Representatives from Maryland's 5th congressional district 1803–1811	Succeeded by Peter Little
Preceded by Peter Little	Member of the U.S. House of Representatives from Maryland's 5th congressional district 1813–1815	Succeeded by Samuel Smith
