= Freed =

Freed may refer to:

== People ==
- Alan Freed (1921–1965), American radio personality
- Arthur Freed (1894–1973), American film producer and lyricist
- Edgar Stanley Freed (1889–1950), American chemical engineer known for his contributions to the Chilean nitrate industry
- Dan Freed (born 1959), American mathematician
- Donald Freed, American novelist
- Gene Freed (1930–2009), American bridge player
- James Ingo Freed (1930–2005), German-American architect
- Leonard Freed (1929–2006), American photographer
- Richard Freed (1928–2022), American music critic

== Media ==
- Jio Freed, a character in O-Parts Hunter
- The Freed Man, 1989 Sebadoh album
- "Freed", a song by Tracy Bonham, from her album Down Here
- Freed: Fifty Shades Freed as Told by Christian, 2021 novel by E. L. James

== Other ==
- Freed, West Virginia
- Freed of London, a specialist manufacturer of dance shoes and clothing
- Honda Freed, a Mini MPV vehicle made by Honda
- Freedman, a former slave who has been released from slavery

== See also ==
- Free (disambiguation)
- Freedom (disambiguation)
- Freeman (disambiguation)
