= Freedom, Ohio (disambiguation) =

Freedom, Ohio is an unincorporated community and township in Portage County. Freedom, Ohio, may also refer to:

- Freedom and Freedom Station, former post offices in Freedom Township, Portage County, Ohio
- Freedom, a community in Stark County that formed the city of Alliance, Ohio
- Freedom, an early name for New Rochester, Wood County, Ohio
- Freedom, early variant name of the unincorporated community of Naomi, Ohio, in Henry County
  - Freedom Mills, former post office and early variant name of Naomi, Ohio
- Freedom, a former name for the unincorporated community of Whigville, Ohio, in Noble County
