= Gratis =

Gratis may refer to:

- Free (gratis), meaning without charge
- Gratis, Ohio, a village in Preble County, US
- Gratis Township, Preble County, Ohio, US
- Gratis Internet, a US referral marketing company

== See also ==
- Free (disambiguation)
