= Jon Secada discography =

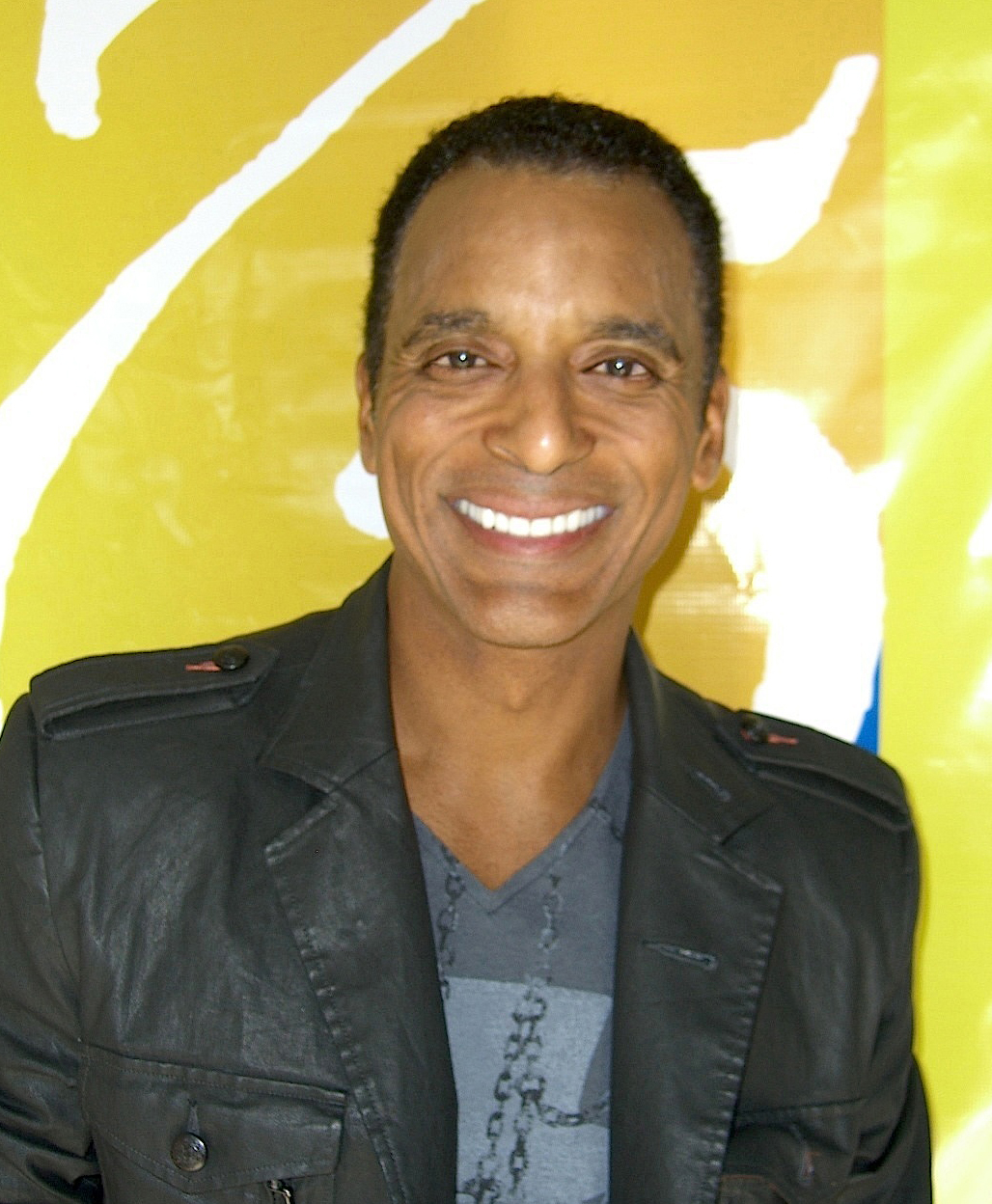
- Secada in 2011
- Studio albums: 14
- Live albums: 1
- Compilation albums: 5
- Singles: 56

This is the discography for Cuban-born American pop singer Jon Secada.

== Albums ==
=== Studio albums ===
List of albums, with selected chart positions, and certifications
Title	Details	Peak chart positions									Certifications
Title	Details	US	US Latin	AUS	GER	NLD	SPA	SWE	SWI	UK	Certifications
Jon Secada / Otro Día Más Sin Verte	Released: May 5, 1992; Label: SBK Records; Format: CD, LP, cassette	15	8	89	5	43	1	39	7	20	RIAA: 3× Platinum; BPI: Gold; MC: 3× Platinum
Heart, Soul & a Voice / Si Te Vas	Released: May 24, 1994; Label: SBK Records; Format: CD, LP, cassette	21	5	37	26	71	46	46	21	19	RIAA: Platinum; MC: Platinum
Amor	Released: October 10, 1995; Label: SBK Records; Format: CD, cassette	—	6	—	—	—	—	—	—	—	
Secada	Released: March 25, 1997; Label: SBK Records; Format: CD, cassette	40	35	—	34	—	—	—	44	179	
Better Part of Me	Released: April 4, 2000; Label: Epic, 550 Music; Format: CD, cassette	173	—	—	—	—	48	—	66	—	
The Gift	Released: November 20, 2001; Label: Epic; Format: CD	—	—	—	—	—	—	—	—	—	
Amanecer	Released: October 22, 2002; Label: Epic, Sony Discos; Format: CD	—	—	—	—	—	48	—	—	—	
Same Dream	Released: October 25, 2005; Label: Big3 Records; Format: CD	—	—	—	—	—	—	—	—	—	
A Christmas Fiesta / Una Fiesta Navidena	Released: October 23, 2007; Label: Big3 Records; Format: CD	—	—	—	—	—	—	—	—	—	
Expressions	Released: September 22, 2009; Label: Secada Productions; Format: CD	—	—	—	—	—	—	—	—	—	
Classics / Clasicos	Released: February 2, 2010; Label: Big3 Records; Format: CD	—	—	—	—	—	—	—	—	—	
Otra Vez	Released: February 8, 2011; Label: YME Entertainment; Format: CD	—	—	—	—	—	—	—	—	—	
Navidad	Released: November 21, 2014; Label: Babel Discos; Format: CD	—	—	—	—	—	—	—	—	—	
To Beny Moré With Love (Featuring The Charlie Sepulveda Big Band)	Released: March 3, 2017; Label: BMG; Format: CD	—	—	—	—	—	—	—	—	—	
"—" denotes releases that did not chart or were not released in that territory.

=== Compilation albums ===
Title	Details
Greatest Hits	Released: July 27, 1999; Format: CD
Grandes Éxitos	Released: August 10, 1999; Format: CD
Latin Classic	Released: October 1, 2002; Format: CD
30 Éxitos Insuperables	Released: July 22, 2003; Format: CD
Collected	Released: 2008; Format: CD

=== Collaboration albums ===
Title	Details
Unity: The Latin Tribute to Michael Jackson	Released: 2015; Format: CD

== Singles ==
=== As lead artist ===
Year	Title	Chart positions											Certifications	Album
Year	Title	US	US A.C.	US Latin	AUS	CAN	GER	NLD	SPA	SWE	SWI	UK	Certifications	Album
1984	"Wishes"	—	—	—	—	—	—	—	—	—	—	—		Non-album singles
1986	"Love with a Smile"	—	—	—	—	—	—	—	—	—	—	—		Non-album singles
1989	"Dias Como Hoy"	—	—	—	—	—	—	—	—	—	—	—		Jon Secada
1992	"Just Another Day" / "Otro Día Más Sin Verte"	5	2	1	12	2	3	2	1	1	2	5	RIAA: Gold; BPI: Silver	Jon Secada / Otro Día Más Sin Verte
1992	"Do You Believe in Us" / "Cree En Nuestro Amor"	13	3	1	38	3	19	—	—	34	—	30		Jon Secada / Otro Día Más Sin Verte
1992	"Angel"	18	3	1	112	4	72	35	—	—	—	23		Jon Secada / Otro Día Más Sin Verte
1993	"Do You Really Want Me?"	—	—	—	—	—	—	—	—	—	—	30		Jon Secada
1993	"I'm Free" / "Sentir"	27	4	1	—	3	—	—	—	—	—	50		Jon Secada / Otro Día Más Sin Verte
1993	"One of a Kind" / "Tu Amor Es Mi Libertad"	—	—	—	—	—	60	—	—	—	—	—		Jon Secada / Otro Día Más Sin Verte
1993	"Tiempo al Tiempo"	—	—	9	—	—	—	—	—	—	—	—		Otro Día Más Sin Verte
1994	"If You Go" / "Si Te Vas"	10	2	1	47	3	41	39	—	—	—	39		Heart, Soul & a Voice / Si Te Vas
1994	"Whipped" / "Quiero Mas"	65	34	—	—	20	—	—	—	—	—	99		Heart, Soul & a Voice
1994	"Mental Picture" / "Solo Tu Imagen"	29	10	13	—	16	—	—	—	—	—	44		Heart, Soul & a Voice / Si Te Vas
1994	"Ciego De Amor"	—	—	—	—	—	—	—	—	—	—	—		Si Te Vas
1995	"Where Do I Go from You"	112	36	—	—	43	—	—	—	—	—	—		Heart, Soul & a Voice
1995	"If I Never Knew You" / "Si No Te Conoceria" (featuring Shanice)	108	—	—	128	—	—	—	—	—	—	51		Pocahontas (Soundtrack)
1995	"Se Eu Não Te Encontrasse" (featuring Daniela Mercury)	—	—	—	—	—	—	—	—	—	—	—		Pocahontas (Soundtrack)
1995	"Es Por Ti"	—	—	5	—	—	—	—	—	—	—	—		Amor
1996	"Alma con Alma"	—	—	—	—	—	—	—	—	—	—	—		Amor
1996	"Un Mundo Nuevo"	—	—	—	—	—	—	—	—	—	—	—		Voces Unidas (Various Artists)
1997	"Too Late Too Soon" / "Amándolo"	41	8	10	90	56	61	95	—	—	—	43		Secada
1997	"I Will Always Remember"	—	—	—	—	—	—	—	—	—	—	—		Non-album single
1997	"Believe"	—	—	—	—	—	—	—	—	—	—	—		Secada
1997	"La Magia De Tu Amor"	—	—	25	—	—	—	—	—	—	—	—		Secada
1998	"Quiero Vivir La Vida Amandote" (featuring Ana Gabriel)	—	—	—	—	—	—	—	—	—	—	—		The Mask of Zorro Soundtrack
2000	"Stop" / "Así"	—	23	32	—	—	74	91	3	—	66	—		Better Part of Me
2000	"Papi"	—	—	—	—	—	—	—	—	—	—	—		Better Part of Me
2000	"Break The Walls"	—	—	—	—	—	—	—	—	—	—	—		Better Part of Me
2000	"Dentro De Ti"	—	—	—	—	—	—	—	—	—	—	—		Better Part of Me
2000	"There's No Sunshine Anymore"	—	—	—	—	—	—	—	—	—	—	—		Better Part of Me
2001	"El Ultimo Adios" / "The Last Goodbye"	—	—	—	—	—	—	—	—	—	—	—		Non-album single
2001	"Cuando El Tiempo Nos Castiga"	—	—	—	—	—	—	—	—	—	—	—		The Gift
2002	"Ay! Bueno" (featuring Fernando Villalona)	—	—		—	—	—	—	—	—	—	—		Amanecer
2002	"Si No Fuera Por Ti"	—	—	3	—	—	—	—	—	—	—	—		Amanecer
2003	"Por Amor" (featuring Gloria Estefan)	—	—	18	—	—	—	—	—	—	—	—		Amanecer
2005	"Center" (with George Acosta)	—	—	—	—	—	—	—	—	—	—	—		Non-album single
2005	"Window to My Heart" / "Dejate Amar"	—	6	—	—	—	—	—	—	—	—	—		Same Dream
2005	"Feliz Navidad"	—	3	—	—	—	—	—	—	—	—	—		A Christmas Fiesta / Una Fiesta Navideña
2006	"Free"	—	21	—	—	—	—	—	—	—	—	—		Same Dream
2006	"We Are Free"	—	29	—	—	—	—	—	—	—	—	—		Non-album singles
2006	"What I Did for Love" (with Dj X)	—	—	—	—	—	—	—	—	—	—	—		Non-album singles
2009	"Just Another Day" (with Bernie Williams)	—	—	—	—	—	—	—	—	—	—	—		Moving Forward
2010	"Lost Inside Your Heart" (featuring Marina Elali)	—	—	—	—	—	—	—	—	—	—	—		Stage Rio
2012	"Dejame Quererte (Mi Secreto)"	—	—	—	—	—	—	—	—	—	—	—		Otra Vez
2012	"Un Sueño Nada Mas"	—	—	—	—	—	—	—	—	—	—	—		Otra Vez
2012	"Noche De Paz" / "Silent Night"	—	—	—	—	—	—	—	—	—	—	—		Otra Vez
2012	"I'm Never Too Far Away"	—	25	—	—	—	—	—	—	—	—	—		Non-album singles
2014	"Still I Rise" (featuring Cyndi Lauper)	—	—	—	—	—	—	—	—	—	—	—		Non-album singles
2016	"With a Little Help from My Friends"	—	—	—	—	—	—	—	—	—	—	—		Non-album singles
2016	"Line of Duty"	—	—	—	—	—	—	—	—	—	—	—		Non-album singles
2016	"Como Fue" (featuring Charlie Sepulveda Big Ban)	—	—	—	—	—	—	—	—	—	—	—		...To Benny More with Love
2017	"Just Another Day" (Reggae Version)	—	—	—	—	—	—	—	—	—	—	—		Non-album singles
2017	"Just Another Day" (featuring Gyptian)	—	—	—	—	—	—	—	—	—	—	—		Non-album singles
2018	"Otro Dia Mas Sin Verte" (con Los Fab 90's)	—	—	—	—	—	—	—	—	—	—	—		Non-album singles
2019	"Por Si No Vuelves" (featuring Soraya)	—	—	—	—	—	—	—	—	—	—	—		Non-album singles
2020	"Playa o Montaña" (featuring Samo & Cero Coincidencias)	—	—	—	—	—	—	—	—	—	—	—		Non-album singles
"—" denotes releases that did not chart or were not released in that territory.

=== As featured artist ===
Year	Title	Chart positions			Album
Year	Title	Hot Latin Tracks	BRA Hot 100	BRA Hit Parade	Album
1996	"Puedes Llegar" (with Gloria Estefan, Ricky Martin, Julio Iglesias and others)	2	—	—	Voces Unidas (Various Artists)
2005	"Center" (with George Acosta)	—	—	—	Lost World
2009	"Lost Inside Your Heart" (with Marina Elali)	—	21	18	Viver a Vida
2021	"Anjo (Angel)" (with Daniel)	—	—	—	Daniel em Casa
"—" denotes releases that did not chart or were not released in that territory.

=== Music videos ===
Year	Title	Director
1992	"Just Another Day"/"Otro Dia Mas Sin Verte"	
1992	"Do You Believe in Us" /" Cree En Nuestro Amor"	Markus Blunder
1992	"Angel"	Jim Yukich
1993	"I'm Free"/"Sentir"	Jim Yukich
1994	"If You Go" / "Si Te Vas"	Matthew Rolston
1994	"Whipped"	Wayne Isham
1994	"Mental Picture" / "Solo tu Imagen"	Zack Snyder
1995	"Where Do I Go from You"	Michael Salomon
1995	"If I Never Knew You" / "Si No Te Conoceria" (with Shanice)	Marcus Nispel
1997	"Too Late Too Soon" / "Amandolo"	Emilio Estefan, Jr.
2000	"Stop" / "Asi"	Pedro Aznar
2002	"Si No Fuera Por Ti"	
2003	"Por Amor" (with Gloria Estefan)	Pablo Croce
2009	"Lost Inside Your Heart" (with Marina Elali)	
2012	"I'm Never Too Far Away"	
