= Free!! =

Spanish mákina music group (1994–2004)

- Origin: Spain
- Genres: Mákina
- Years active: 1994–2004
- Label: Max Music
- Past members: Alberto Tapia; Pedro Miras

Free!! was a Spanish mákina group composed of Alberto Tapia and Pedro Miras. They are known for being one of the most representative groups of the 90's Spanish "Mákina" phenomenon, at the time when this genre crossed over from dance clubs to the pop music arena. Popular songs by the group include "Doctor Beat", "This Groove", and "Kanashimi o Moyashite".

== Discography ==
=== Singles ===
Year	Single	Peak positions	Album
Year	Single	ESP	Album
1994	"Maximum Volume"	—	Singles only
1995	"Doctor Beat"	2	Singles only
1996	"This Groove"	2	Singles only
1998	"Kanashimi o Moyashite"	3	Singles only
2001	"Herz and Herz" (as Free & DJ Soto presents Piramide)	—	Singles only
2004	"Lost in Spain" (as SveN-R-G vs. Bass-T featuring Free)	—	Singles only
"—" denotes releases that did not chart
