= Naomi, Ohio =

Unincorporated community in Ohio, U.S.

Coordinates: 41°29′10″N 84°08′39″W

Naomi is an unincorporated community in Fulton and Henry counties, in the U.S. state of Ohio.

== History ==
Early variant names were Freedom and Freedom Mills. A post office called Freedom Mills was in operation from 1866 until 1880. A post office called Naomi was established in 1897, and closed in 1918. The present name of Naomi honors the family member of an early settler.
