= Freedom, Georgia =

Settlement in Georgia, United States

Coordinates: 32°44′39.9″N 83°01′25.3″W

- Interactive map of Freedom, Georgia
- Country: United States
- State: Georgia
- Established: 2020

Freedom is a Black-separatist settlement in the U.S. state of Georgia established in September 2020, in the wake of a breakdown of race relations after the killing of several African Americans, including the murder of Ahmaud Arbery in Georgia. It was created by 19 African-American families who together purchased 96.71 acres (39.14 hectares) of land in Wilkinson County, near Macon, with the goal of incorporating a city that is a "safe haven for people of color".

== History ==
=== Background ===
Freedom was inspired by a June 2020 viral false news story that the nearby town of Toomsboro, Georgia, was for sale. Although Toomsboro was not for sale as the town's mayor explained, a large amount of rural land near the town was available for purchase. This inspired Renee Walters and Ashley Scott, a realtor from Stonecrest, to create the Freedom Georgia Initiative and propose purchasing the 96.71 acres (39.14 hectares) of land. They brought together 19 African-American families who raised the money to purchase the land. The settlement is located about 130 miles (210 kilometres) south of Atlanta.

=== Current status ===
As of July 2023, the settlement consists of a dilapidated campground, and its founders are working on establishing roads and utility services before beginning building residences. Currently, the settlement consists of more than 500 acres (200 hectares) throughout two parcels. As of May 2024, construction for permanent dwellings or vital infrastructure has not begun. As of June 2025 no updates have been given to the future of the project, with their X account being de-activated and no further updates from any social media platform.

== See also ==
- Brooklyn, Illinois
- Eatonville, Florida
- Mound Bayou, Mississippi
- Nicodemus, Kansas
- Ravenden, Arkansas
- Robbins, Illinois
- Soul City, North Carolina
- National Movement for the Establishment of a 49th State
