= Weiwang M20 =

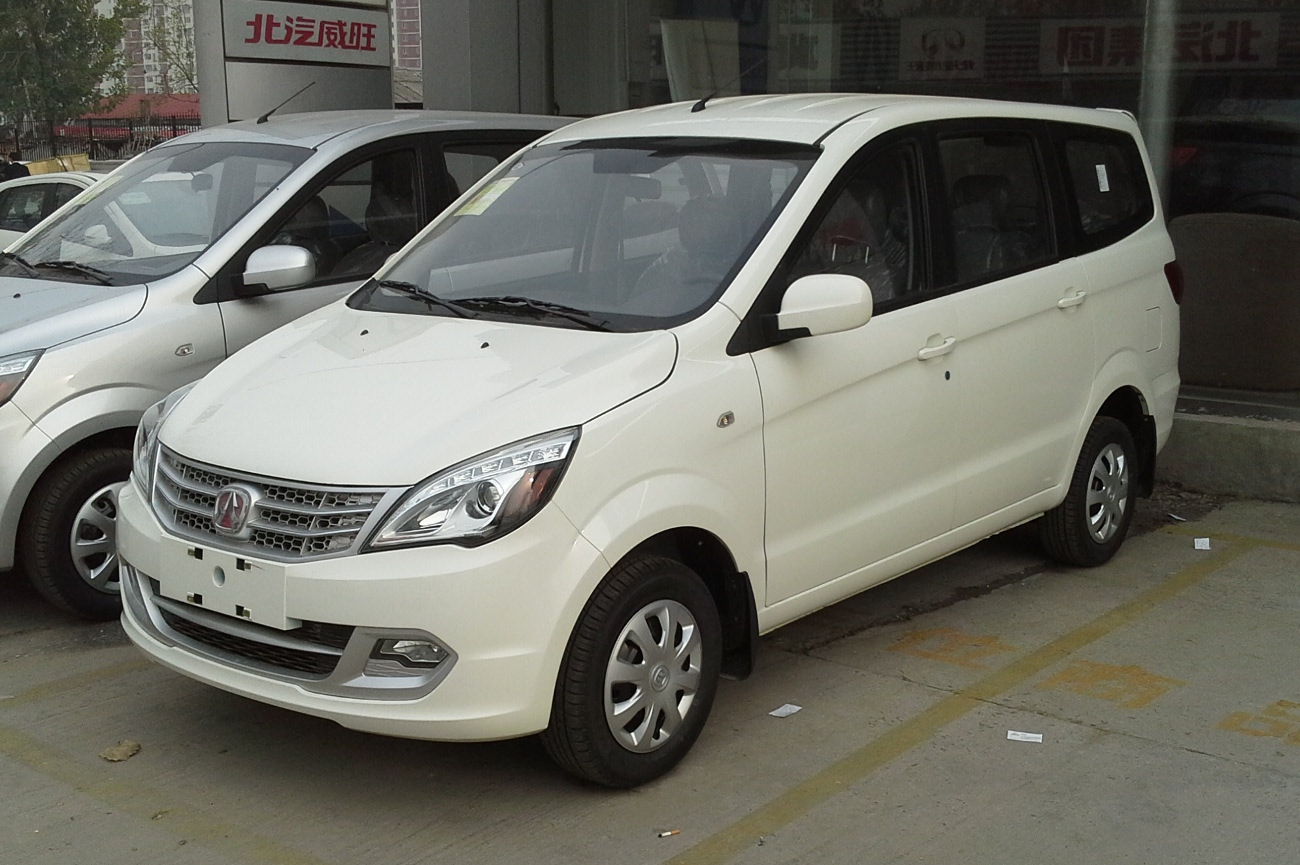

Overview
- Manufacturer: BAIC Group
- Also called: Weiwang M30; Weiwang M35; Changhe Freedom M50; Ruili Doda V2
- Production: 2013–2017; 2015–2021 (Changhe M50)

Body and chassis
- Class: mini MPV
- Body style: 5-door van
- Layout: Mid-engine Rear wheel drive
- Related: Huansu H2

Powertrain
- Engine: 1.5L I4
- Transmission: 5 speed manual

Dimensions
- Wheelbase: 2,790 mm (109.8 in)
- Length: 4,440 mm (174.8 in)
- Width: 1,700 mm (66.9 in)
- Height: 1,783 mm (70.2 in)

The Weiwang M20, M30, and M35 are mini MPVs produced by Weiwang, a sub-brand of BAIC.

== Weiwang M20 ==
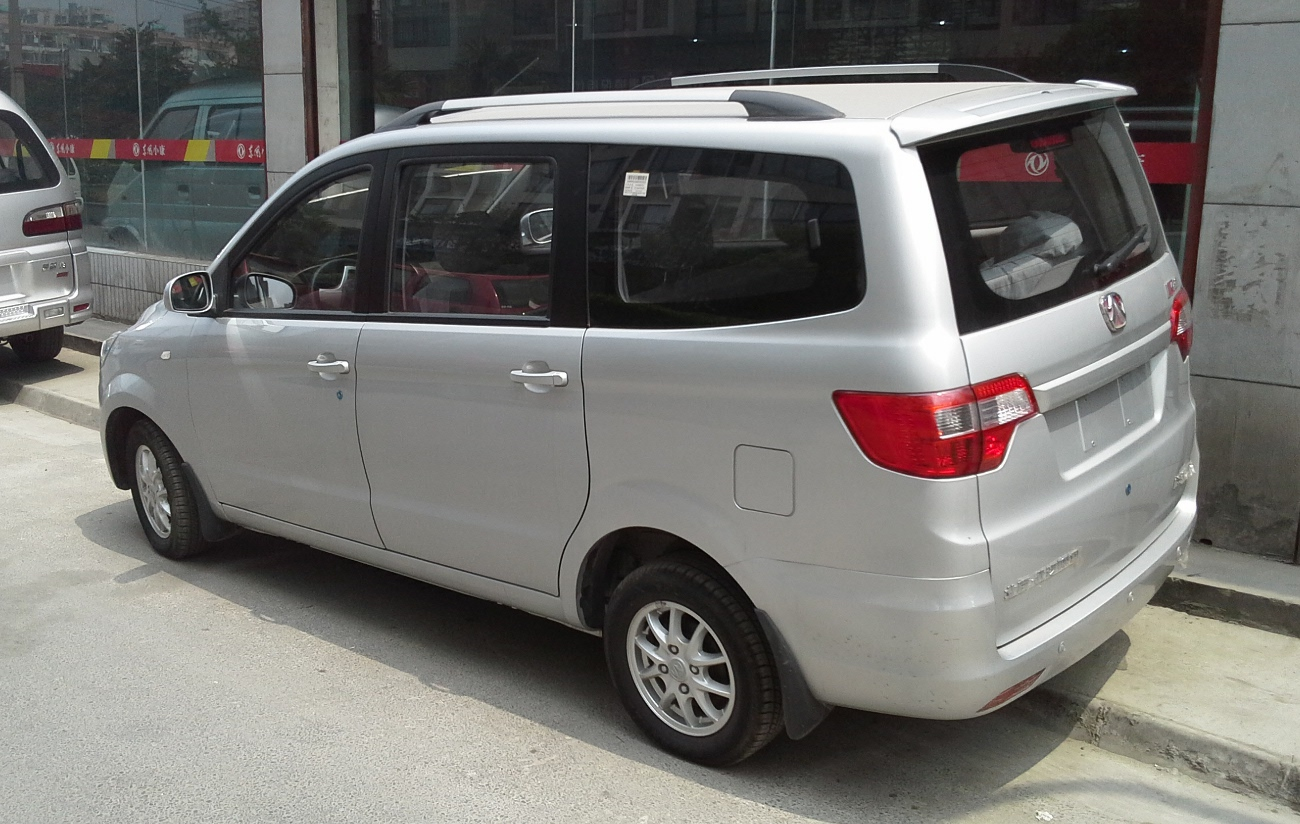
Weiwang M20 rear

The Beijing Auto Weiwang M20 debuted during the 2013 Guangzhou Auto Show with the first examples of the mini-MPV available with a pre-sale price of 62,800 yuan.

The production model was officially available to the market in October 2013 with prices starting from 46,800 yuan to 63,800 yuan. The engine of the Weiwang M20 is a 1.5 liter four-cylinder engine producing 79 kW (106 hp) and 145 N⋅m (107 lb⋅ft), mated to a 5-speed manual transmission. Weiwang is a brand under the Beiqi Yinxiang Automobile, a joint venture between Beijing Auto (Beiqi) and the Yinxiang Motorcycle Group from Chongqing. This joint venture also sells the Huansu brand and the Weiwang M20 is based on the same platform as the Huansu H2.

The Weiwang M20 can be configured as an 8-seater model. The interior is equipped with standard feature such as remote key, power windows, air conditioner, CD player, rear parking radar, and front fog lamps come standard on all trim levels except for the entry trim level. The M20 was the 8th best-selling MPV in China in 2014 with 77,497 deliveries.

== Weiwang M30 ==
The Weiwang M30 is the more premium facelift variant of the regular Weiwang M20 featuring a redesigned front bumper with restyled grilles and front and rear lamps. The Weiwang M30 was introduced at the end of 2015 as a replacement to the Weiwang M20 that it was based on.

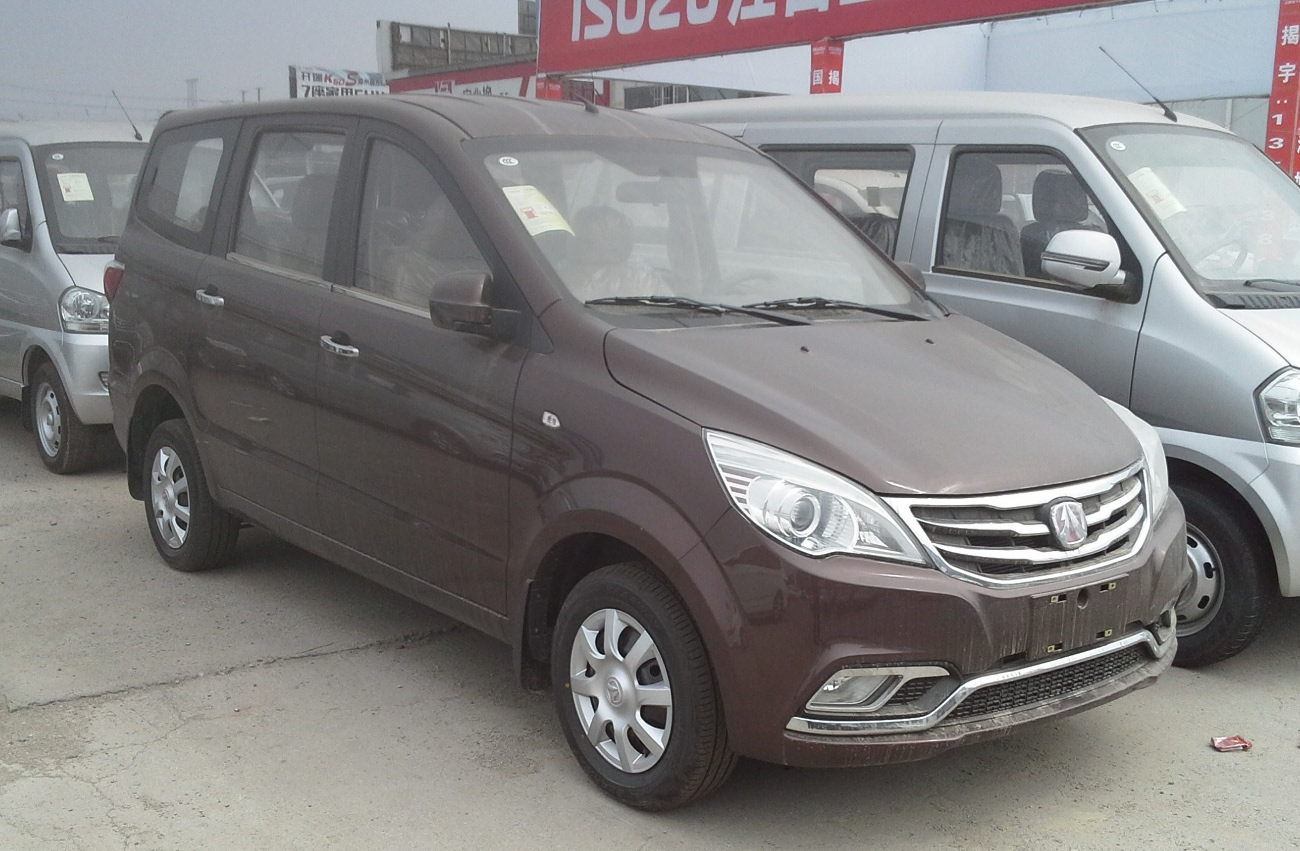
Weiwang M30 front

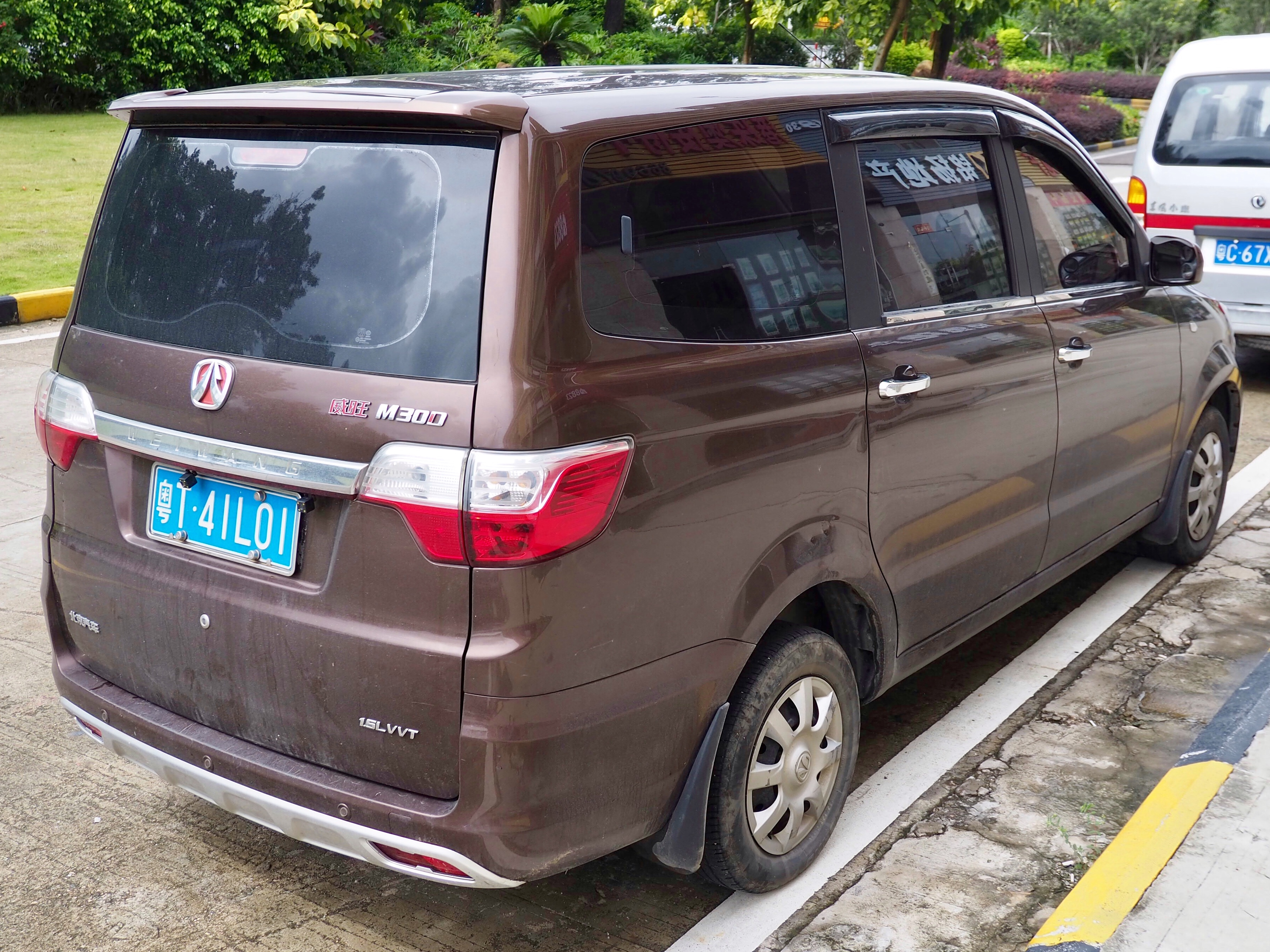
Weiwang M30D rear

== Weiwang M35 ==
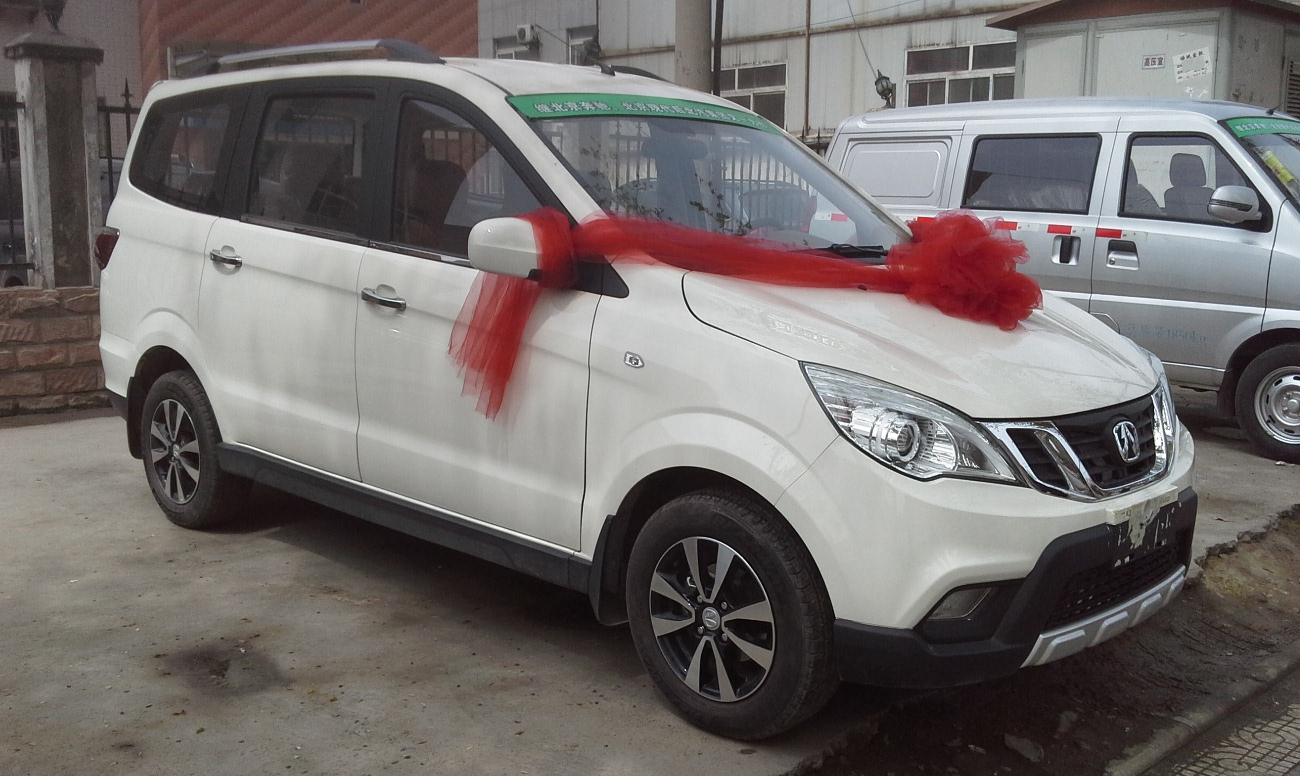
Weiwang M35

The Weiwang M35 is the crossover variant of the regular Weiwang M20 featuring a redesigned front bumper with restyled grilles and front and rear lamps that also varies from the Weiwang M30. The Weiwang M35 also features plastic claddings on the side skirts and a slightly higher ground clearance for the crossover-inspired styling.

== Changhe Freedom M50 ==
The Changhe Freedom M50 or Changhe Furuida M50 is a badge engineered variant of the Weiwang M20 featuring a redesigned front end. It was sold as part of the Freedom MPV series under the Changhe sub-brand of BAIC Group.

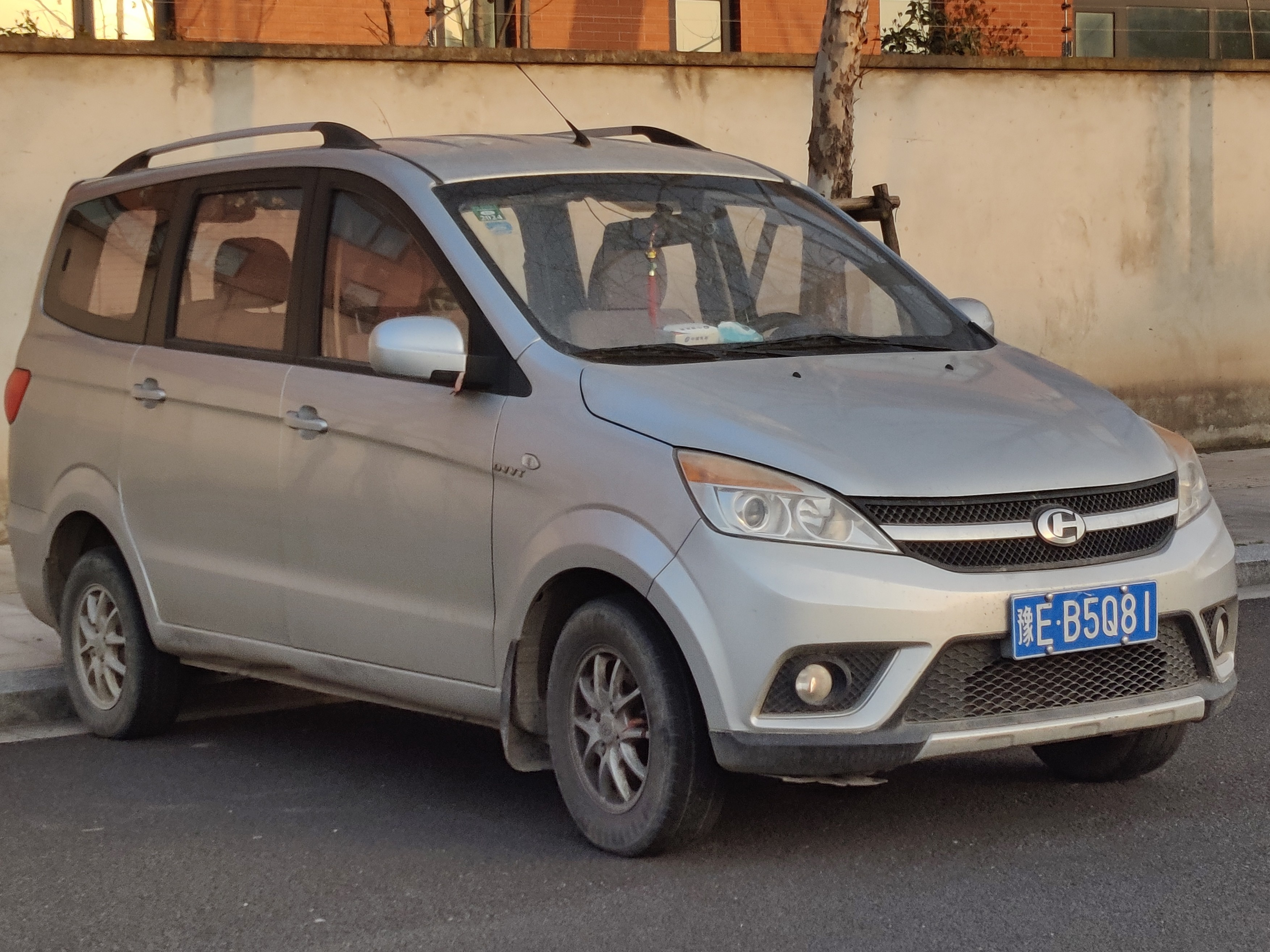
Changhe Freedom M50 early model front

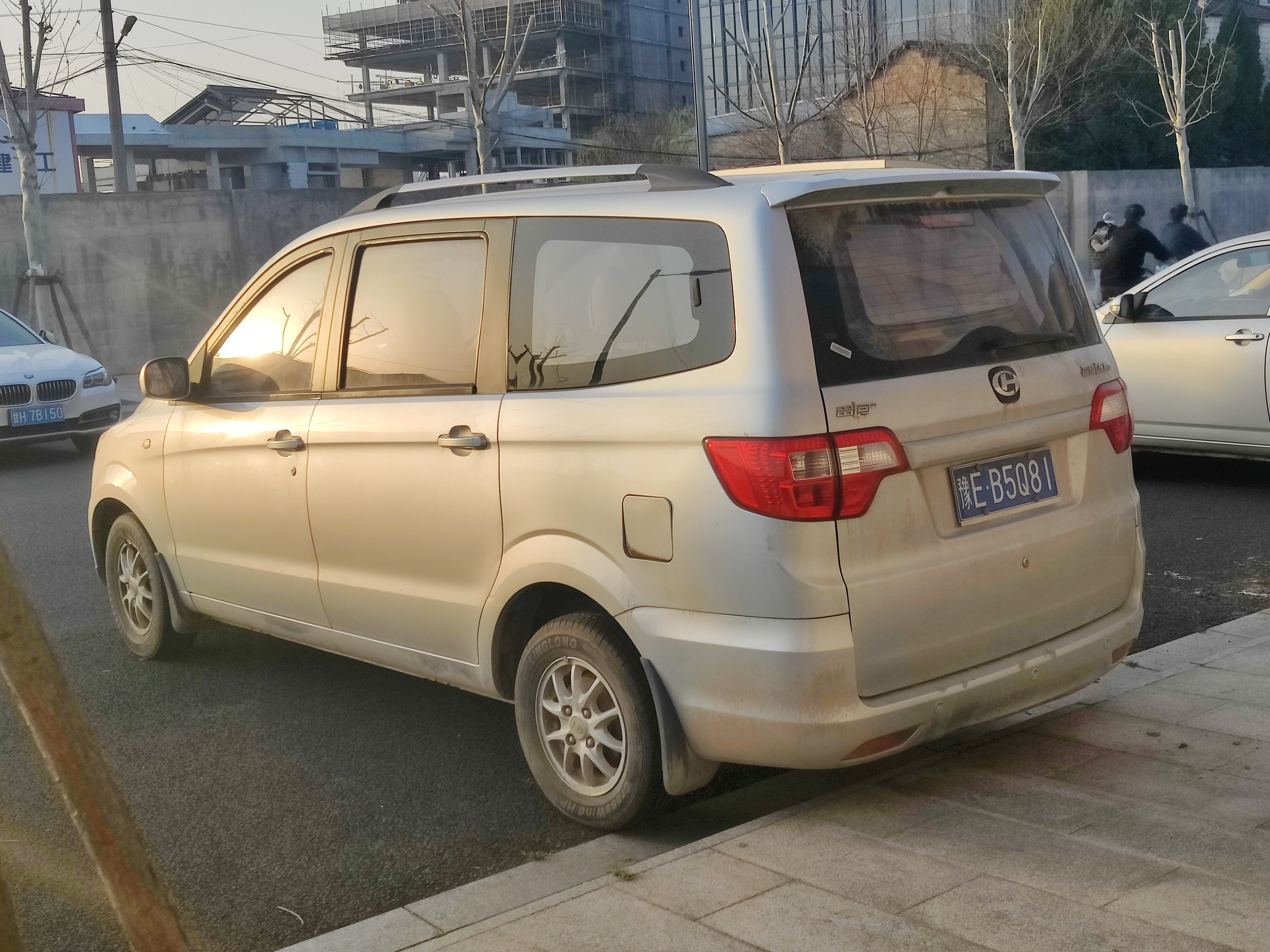
Changhe Freedom M50 early model rear

Later models share the exact same front bumpers as the Weiwang M20 variants with only the badges and the front grilles replaced.

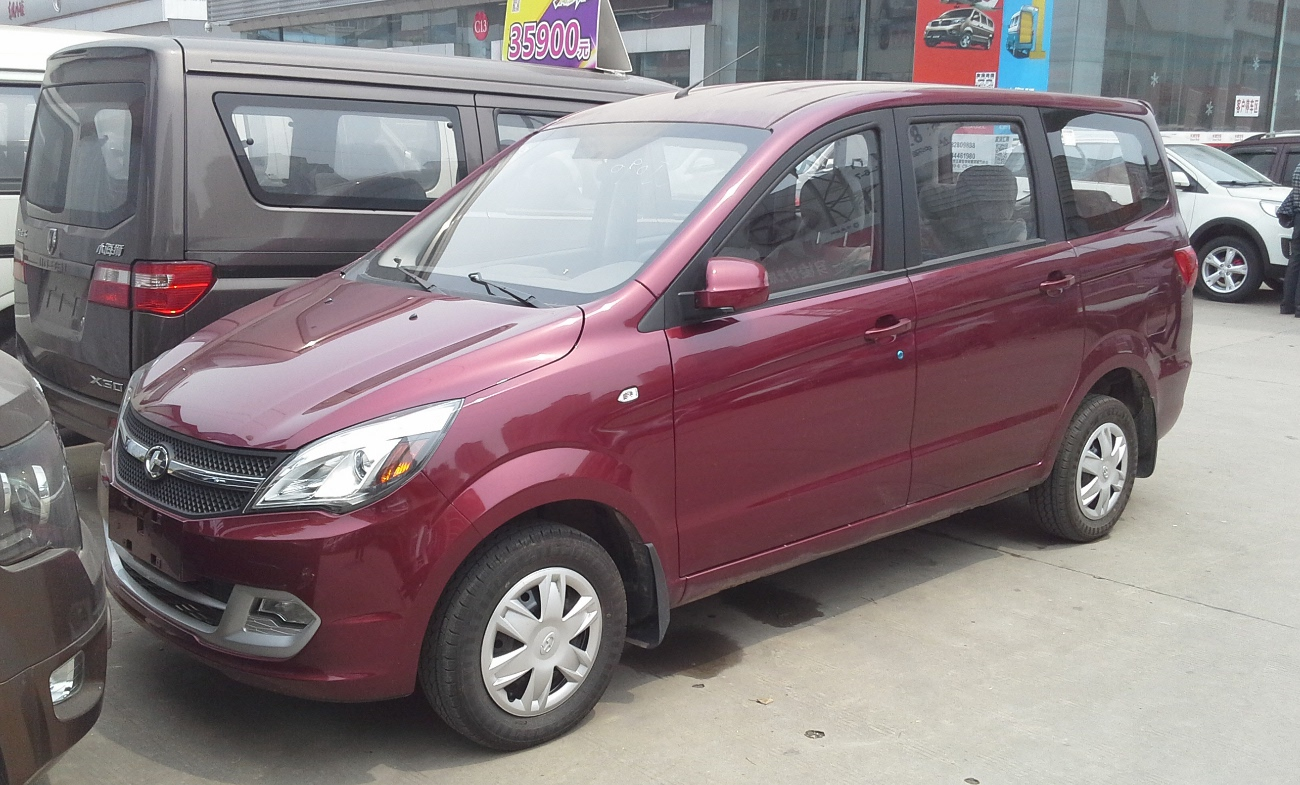
Changhe Freedom M50 facelift front

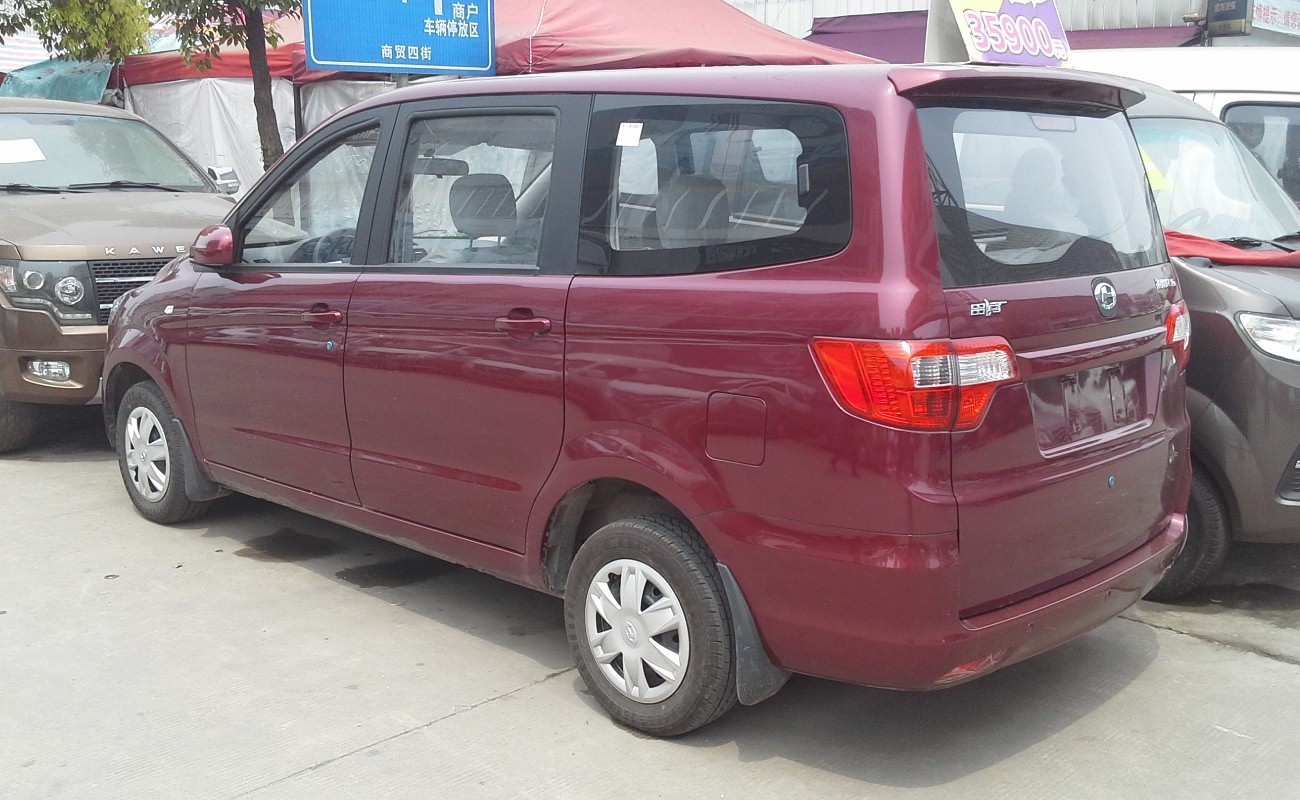
Changhe Freedom M50 facelift rear

=== Changhe Freedom M50S ===
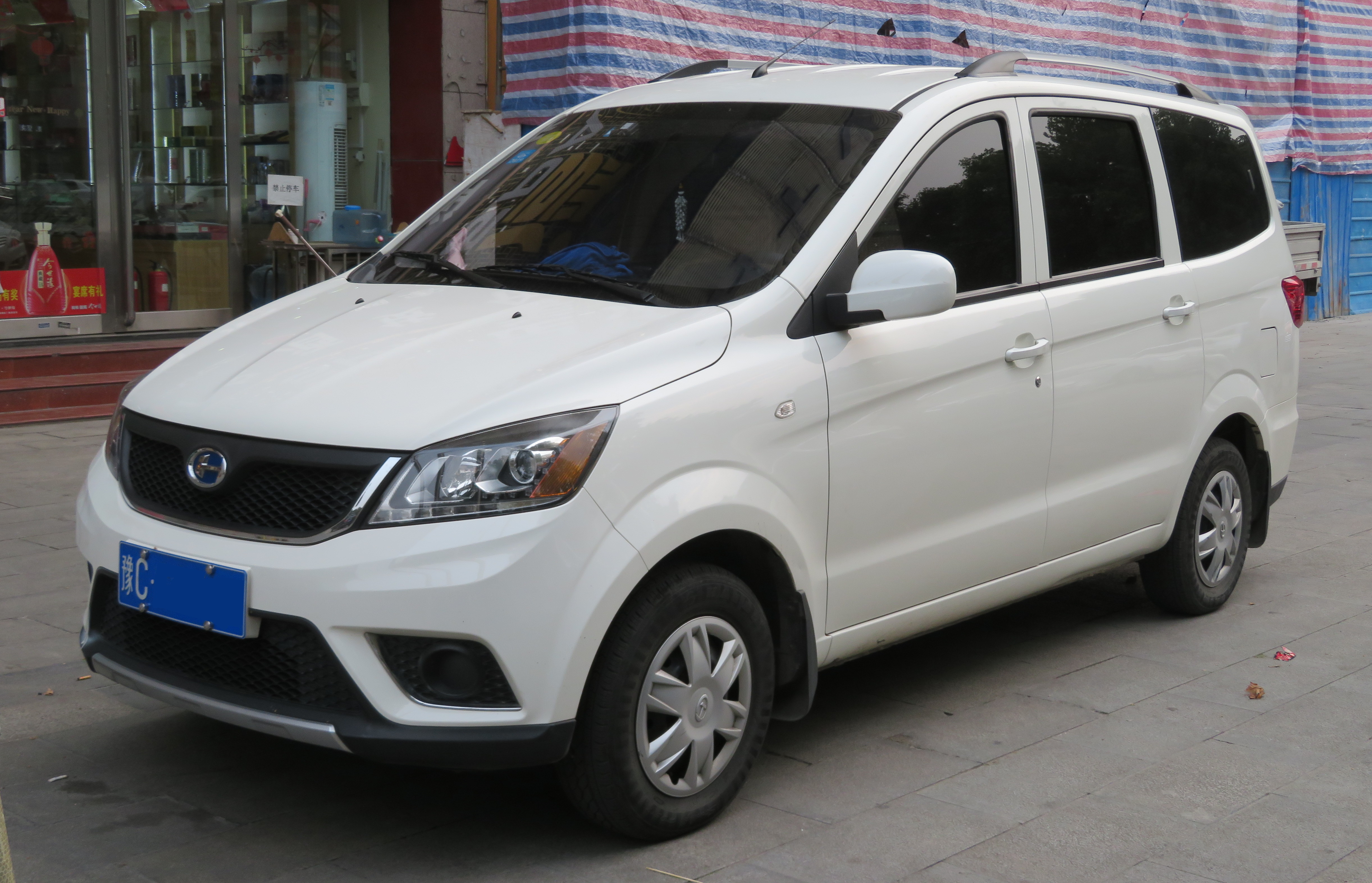
Changhe Freedom M50S front

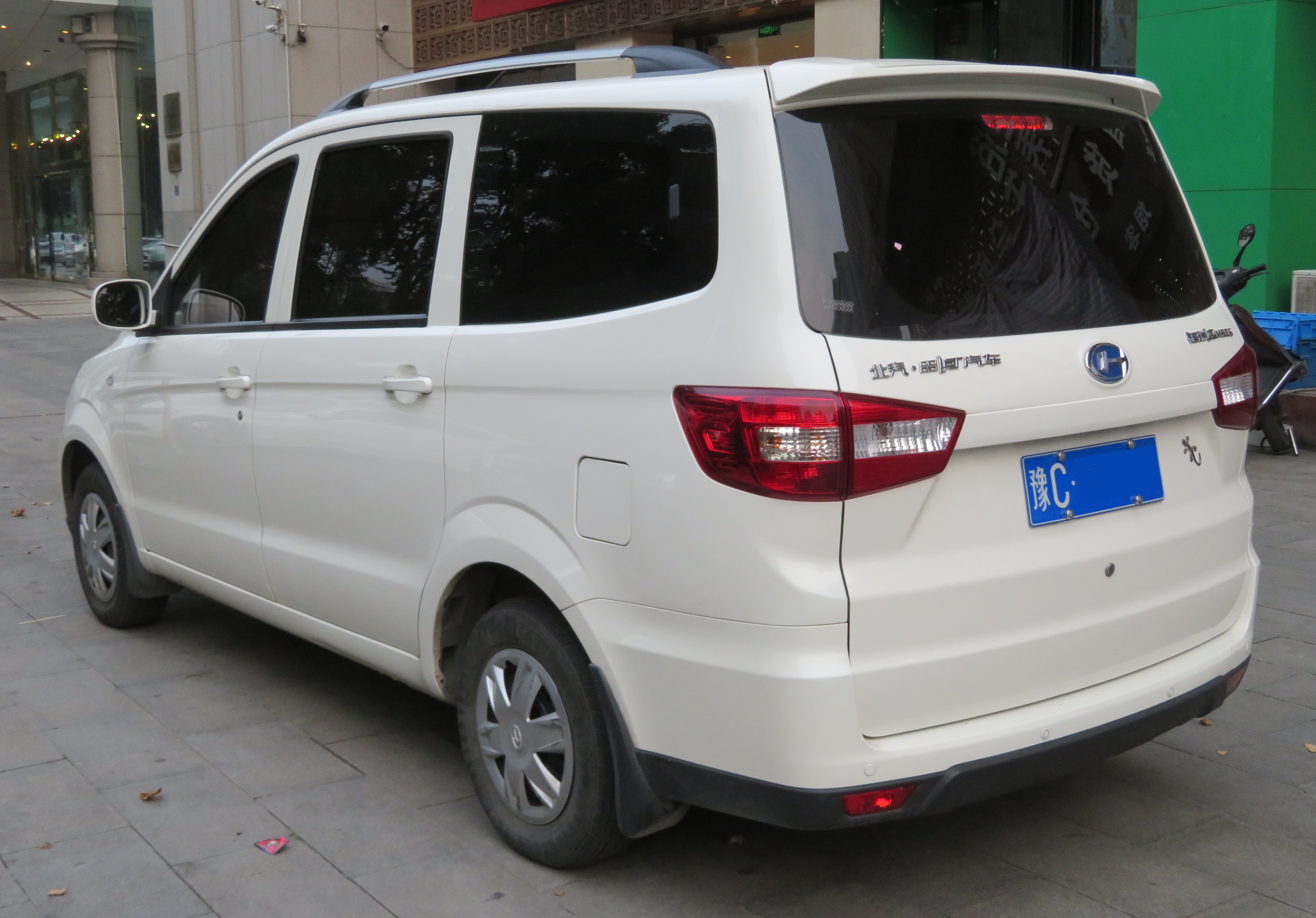
Changhe Freedom M50S rear

A sportier version called the Changhe Freedom M50S was also available featuring a redesigned front bumper and rocker panels.
