= USS Freedom =

USS Freedom may refer to the following ships operated by the United States Navy:

- USS Freedom (ID-3024), a cargo ship that served during and shortly after World War I
- Freedom (IX-43), a non-commissioned auxiliary schooner that served from 1940 to 1962
- USS Freedom (LCS-1), a littoral combat ship, decommissioned in 2021
