= Free (cigarette) =

Brazilian cigarette brand

- Product type: Cigarette
- Current owner: Souza Cruz, a subsidiary of British American Tobacco
- Country: Brazil
- Introduced: 1984; 42 years ago
- Discontinued: 2016
- Markets: Brazil, United States, Mexico, Costa Rica
- Tagline: "Free-A matter of common sense"

Free was a Brazilian brand of cigarettes, owned and manufactured by Souza Cruz, a subsidiary of British American Tobacco. It was discontinued in 2016.

== History ==
Pack of Free

The brand was launched in 1984 (one of the slogans: "Free-A matter of common sense"). Nowadays, it is one of the most purchased cigarettes in Brazil and, according to the company, it is the leader in the category of cigarettes with tar levels below 7 mg.

In 2009, the company reformulated the brand's packaging and launched a line of products on the basis of menthol, the family Mix (Fresh Mix, Citric Mix and Spicy Mix).

Souza Cruz started in the following months a trademark migration process made for eight years with the now defunct Carlton, which gradually turned into Dunhill. This time, the global brand of Souza Cruz, which succeeded the Free was Kent.

By the end of 2016, Free also imprinted the logo of Kent. Within a year, the name Free was removed from the pack.

The brand was mainly sold in Brazil, but was also sold in the United States, Mexico and Costa Rica.

== See also ==
- Tobacco smoking
