= USA Freedom Kids =

American girl group

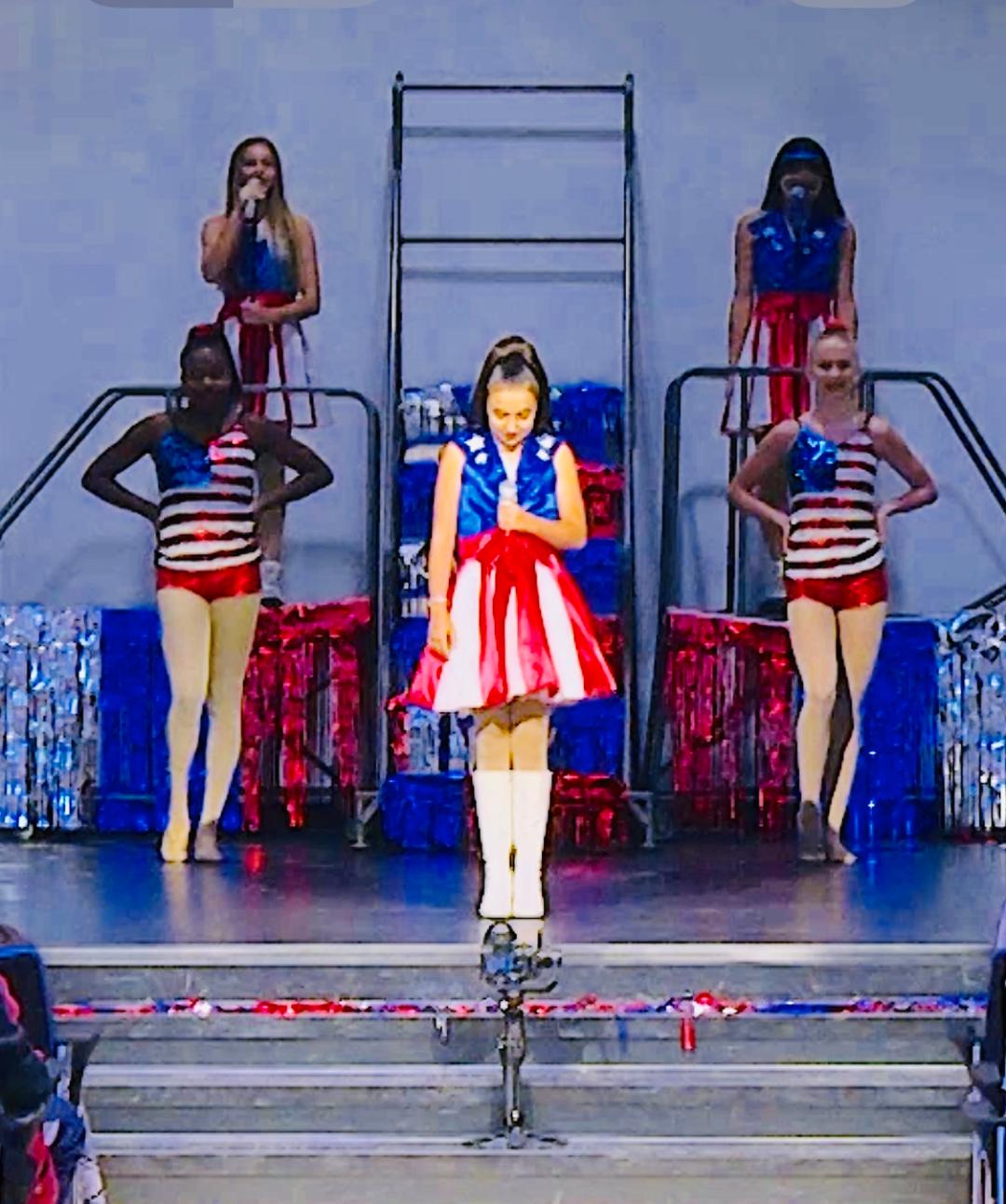
- 2019 performance

Background information
- Also known as: USA Freedom Girls
- Origin: Naples, Florida, United States
- Genres: Pop; children's music
- Years active: 2015-present
- Members: Alexis Popick; Bianca; Izzy; Sarah; Victoria
- Website: www.usafreedomkids.com

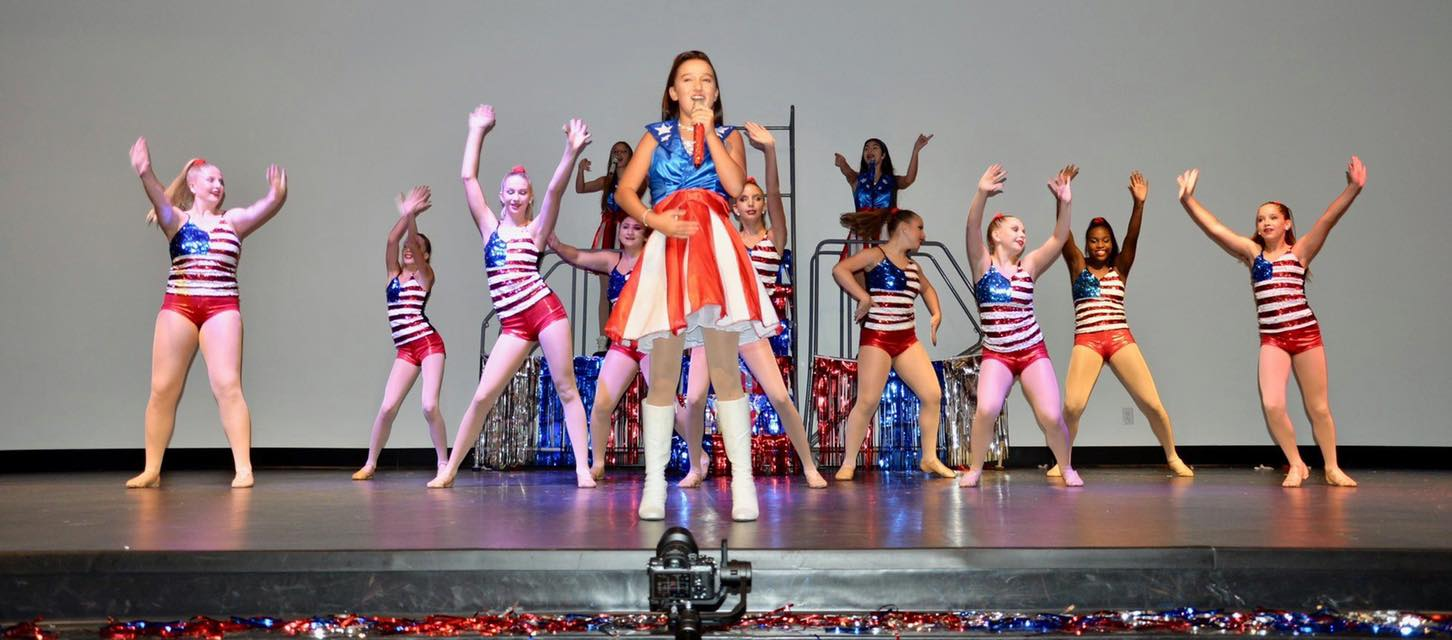
USA Freedom Kids at a 2019 performance

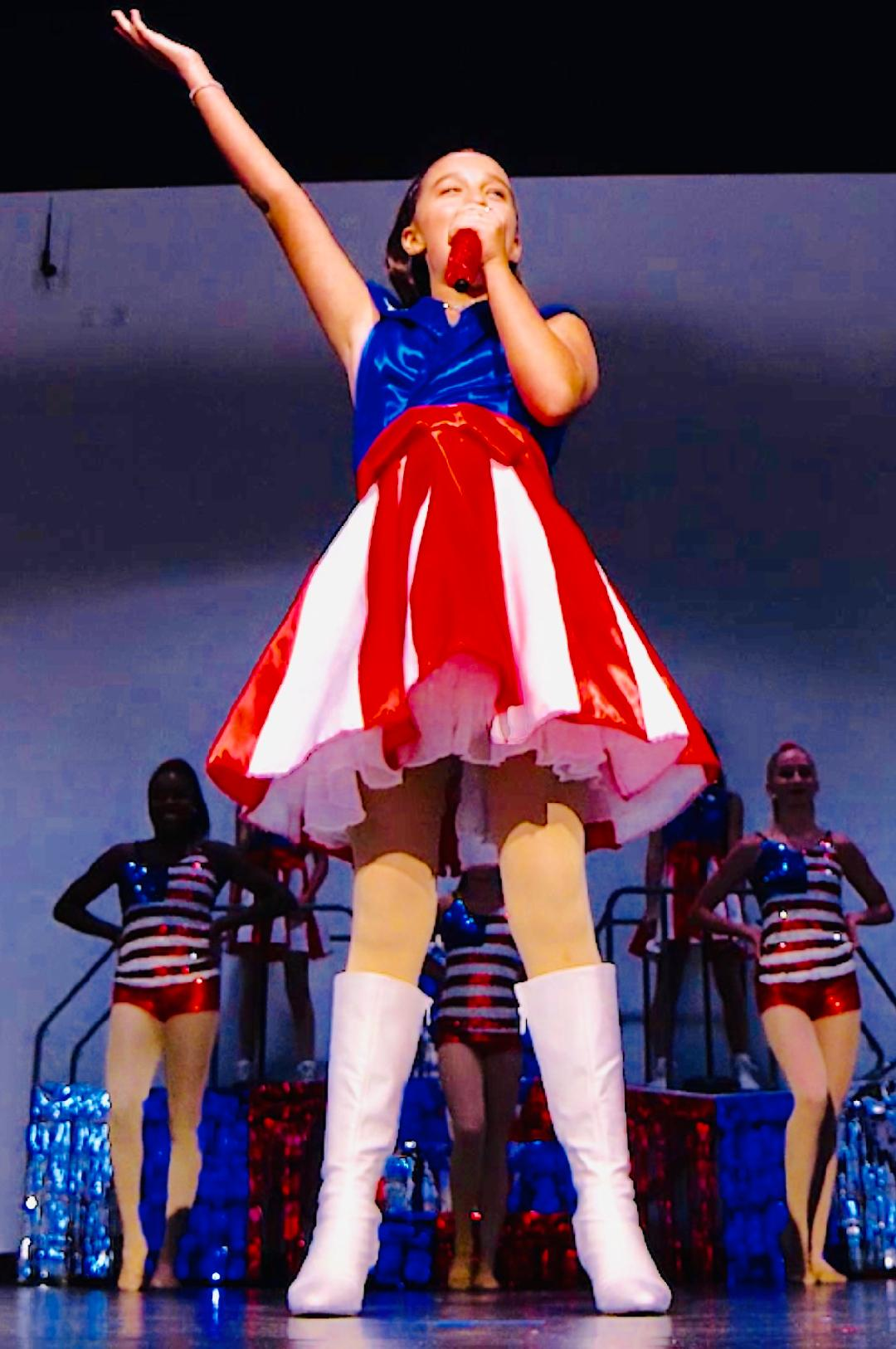
Performance in 2019

USA Freedom Kids, sometimes referred to as USA Freedom Girls, are an American girl group known for performing their song "Freedom's Call" at a Donald Trump rally in Pensacola, Florida in January 2016, during his presidential campaign. While the group's manager formerly supported Trump, he claims that the group has never been political, and that they had offered to perform at Hillary Clinton's rallies. In 2020, the group supported the election of Joe Biden, re-recording their most known song.

== History ==
At the time of the group's formation, Alexis Popick was 8, Bianca and Izzy were both 11, Sarah was 13 and Victoria was 12. The group was formed and is managed by Alexis' father, Jeff Popick, a former television stunt man and Trump supporter. They came together from a casting call and include 3 performers and 2 girls who only record in the studio. Sarah has been blind since birth. The group is from Naples, Florida.

Before the performance at a Trump rally, one of Simon Cowell's executive producers is said to have expressed interest in the group, suggesting that they had product licensing potential.

In September 2016, the group sued the Trump campaign for $15,000 (~$19,653 in 2024) for failure to book the group for promised future performances and refusing to allow the group to sell merchandise when performing at rallies. The group ultimately dropped the lawsuit in December 2016.

The group switched allegiance, re-recording their formerly pro-Trump song "Freedom's Call" in 2020, with Biden's "Build Back Better" transitional slogan in the new lyrics. Manager Jeff Popick commented that "Instead of having a president that fights with Americans, we need a president that fights for Americans."

== Musical career ==
=== "Freedom's Call" ===
Bianca, Alexis, and Izzy performed the song "Freedom's Call" at the January 13, 2016 Donald Trump rally in Pensacola, Florida in front of about 15,000 people, during his 2016 presidential campaign. The performance had been viewed more than 2 million times on YouTube by January 15. "Freedom's Call" was written by Jeff and is sung to the tune of George M. Cohan's "Over There" (1917), which was popularized during World Wars I and II, including in George M. Cohan's 1942 film Yankee Doodle Dandy. He was inspired to write the song when he saw Donald Trump say that he "will find the General Patton" to defeat ISIS during his presidential candidacy announcement. Their performance video went viral and as of 2018 had been viewed on YouTube more than 30 million times.

=== Other performances ===
The group has also performed in front of the Rock and Roll Hall of Fame at the 2016 Republican National Convention in Cleveland. They also performed at the "Star Spangled Summer" concert series at the Daytona Beach Bandshell on 4 July 2016.

Additionally, they have performed for the fire and police departments of Marco Island, Florida. In late 2016, the USA Freedom Kids released their first official music video for their song, "National Anthem-Part 2." This dance remix taught fans their signature dance move the "Freedom Wave." The group has been seen traveling in their truck limousine, painted pink, with the USA Freedom Kids logo plastered on both sides and a "USA KID" license plate.

Other songs by the USA Freedom Kids are "The National Anthem Part Two" (2015 debut release), "Dream Big, Work Hard", "American Mommies", and "Grand Old Flag".

The USA Freedom Kids sang the National Anthem and God Bless America at a 9/11 Remembrance Memorial at Patriot's Park. The group also performs nationwide, including in New York City and Washington D.C. For Patriotic Night celebrating first responders, the group performed at a Miami Marlins game, singing the U.S. national anthem. They have also performed at a Miami Dolphins game.

In 2019, with Alexis as the lead singer, the group performed the "National Anthem-Part 2" for the 75th anniversary of D-Day in Naples, Florida.

The USA Freedom Kids' brand has expanded to include merchandise, a ringtone, and registered their trademarked catchword "Ameritude." CBS News also said that "these girls have Ameritude."

== Reception ==
The USA Freedom Kids were named one of the "45 Americans Who Defined the Election" by Time. According to The New York Post, the song "Freedom's Call" was "catchy-as-hell," while People praised it as an ‘Ameritudinal’ anthem.

Foreign Policy wrote that the girls "will restore your faith in America." However, negative reviews were given by The Huffington Post and The Atlantic, with the former calling it "tacky fascism" and the latter comparing it to North Korea.

== Parodies ==
The group was parodied by Jimmy Kimmel Live!, who had the "Number One America Liberty Children" perform a song in support of Jeb Bush. They were also parodied by the "USA Freedom Grown-Ups", comprising four women and one man, on The Late Show with Stephen Colbert.

== Discography ==
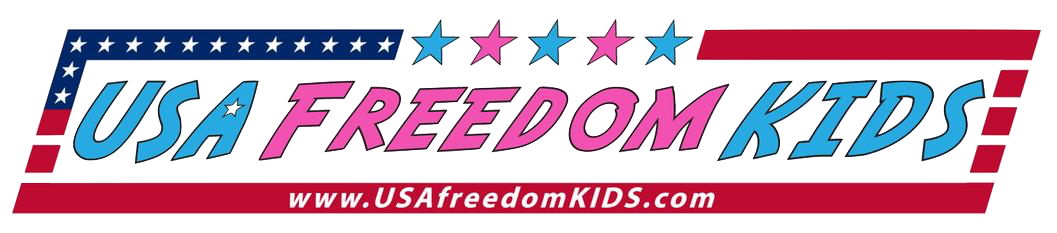
Logo

- Freedom Reborn (2016)

=== Singles ===
- "National Anthem Part 2!" (September 8, 2015)
- "Freedom's Call" (November 11, 2015)
- "American Mommies" (April 22, 2016)
- "Loud & Proud" (July 26, 2016)
