= Freedom (Yoko Ono film) =

- Directed by: Yoko Ono
- Release date: 1970
- Running time: 1 minute
- Country: United Kingdom
- Language: English

Freedom is a 1970 film by Yoko Ono. The film is a minute long and depicts Ono attempting to remove a purple brassiere that she is wearing. The soundtrack to the film was composed and performed by John Lennon. Ono described it as a "great little film" in an interviewer with critic Scott MacDonald for the book A Critical Cinema 2: Interviews with Independent Filmmakers. MacDonald remarked that the film was "so paradoxical. You [Ono] show freedom as the ability to try and break free, which shows that you're never really free".
