= Toomsboro, Georgia =

- Town
- Location in Wilkinson County and the state of Georgia
- Coordinates: 32°49′32″N 83°5′0″W
- Country: United States
- State: Georgia
- County: Wilkinson

Area
  - Total: 1.86 sq mi (4.82 km^{2})
  - Land: 1.86 sq mi (4.82 km^{2})
  - Water: 0 sq mi (0.00 km^{2})
- Elevation: 233 ft (71 m)

Population (2020)
  - Total: 383
  - Density: 205.7/sq mi (79.43/km^{2})
- Time zone: UTC-5 (Eastern (EST))
  - Summer (DST): UTC-4 (EDT)
- ZIP code: 31090
- Area code: 478
- FIPS code: 13-76952
- GNIS feature ID: 0324226
- Website: https://townoftoomsboro.org/

Toomsboro is a town in Wilkinson County, Georgia, United States. The population was 383 in 2020.

== History ==
Toomsboro was founded when the Central of Georgia Railway was extended to that point. Its railroad terminal was built in 1869.

On August 30, 1871, Matthew Deason, a white man, and an African American woman who was possibly his wife, Serena Dul Cat C. Johnson (Georgia Marriages 1699–1944 in Wilkinson County Georgia) were lynched in Toomsboro by members of the Ku Klux Klan. Deason, a former Confederate soldier, was the elected sheriff of Wilkinson County. It was the first documented lynching of a black woman in Georgia after the Civil War.

The Georgia General Assembly incorporated Toomsboro as a town in 1904. The community is named for 18th-century Georgia politician Robert Toombs.

=== Freedom, Georgia ===
David Bumgardner, a developer who bought properties at auction, intended to turn the property he owned into a quaint tourist destination. In April 2012, Bumgardner and Bill Lucado, who also owned property, announced they were seeking a buyer for the properties by advertising "Toomsboro for sale" although the existing community of Toomsboro maintains its own identity. They suggested a movie production company might be interested in using Toomsboro as a film set. In September 2018, 36 pieces of property over 40 acres (16 ha) went up for sale for an asking price of $1.7 million, with an eye toward a preservation-minded buyer "who appreciates its history". In the aftermath of the murder of Ahmaud Arbery in 2020, 19 families cooperatively bought 96.71 acres (39.14 ha) of land in Toomsboro to establish a Black community "where all Black people feel safe without fear of being murdered for who they are". The Freedom Georgia Initiative promotes the new community as Freedom, Georgia.

== Geography ==
Toomsboro is located at 32°49′32″N 83°5′0″W (32.825423, -83.083196). According to the United States Census Bureau, the town has a total area of 1.9 square miles (4.9 km^{2}), all land.

== Demographics ==
Historical population
Census	Pop.	Note	%±
1880	183		—
1900	50		—
1910	404		708.0%
1920	420		4.0%
1930	665		58.3%
1940	593		−10.8%
1950	711		19.9%
1960	764		7.5%
1970	682		−10.7%
1980	673		−1.3%
1990	617		−8.3%
2000	622		0.8%
2010	472		−24.1%
2020	383		−18.9%
U.S. Decennial Census; 1850-1870 1870-1880; 1890-1910 1920-1930; 1940 1950 1960; 1970 1980 1990; 2000 2010 2020

=== Racial and ethnic composition ===
Toomsboro town, Georgia – Racial and ethnic composition Note: the US Census treats Hispanic/Latino as an ethnic category. This table excludes Latinos from the racial categories and assigns them to a separate category. Hispanics/Latinos may be of any race.
Race / Ethnicity (NH = Non-Hispanic)	Pop 2000	Pop 2010	Pop 2020	% 2000	% 2010	% 2020
White alone (NH)	280	233	208	45.02%	49.36%	54.31%
Black or African American alone (NH)	334	223	145	53.70%	47.25%	37.86%
Native American or Alaska Native alone (NH)	0	1	3	0.00%	0.21%	0.78%
Asian alone (NH)	0	0	0	0.00%	0.00%	0.00%
Native Hawaiian or Pacific Islander alone (NH)	0	0	0	0.00%	0.00%	0.00%
Other race alone (NH)	1	0	0	0.16%	0.00%	0.00%
Mixed race or Multiracial (NH)	2	10	14	0.32%	2.12%	3.66%
Hispanic or Latino (any race)	5	5	13	0.80%	1.06%	3.39%
Total	622	472	383	100.00%	100.00%	100.00%

=== 2000 census ===
As of the census of 2000, there were 622 people, 209 households, and 146 families residing in the town. In 2020, its population was 383.
