= Freedom (Merkel book) =

Autobiography of Angela Merkel

Freedom: Memories 1954–2021
- 2024 book jacket
- Author: Angela Merkel
- Audio read by: Juliet Stevenson
- Published: 2024
- Publisher: St. Martin's Press
- Publication place: United States
- Media type: Print, e-book, audio
- Pages: 720
- ISBN: 9781250319906
- OCLC: 1464678055
- Website: Official website

Freedom: Memoirs 1954–2021 is an autobiography written by the former Chancellor of the Federal Republic of Germany, Angela Merkel, and coauthor Beate Baumann. Merkel was the Chancellor for sixteen years, from 2005 to 2021. The book was published on November 26, 2024 by St. Martin's Press.

== Synopsis ==
Merkel has written about her experiences growing up in East Germany and then leading Germany during several international crises as Chancellor.
