= Elation Freedom =

Overview
- Manufacturer: Elation Motors
- Also called: Dogo 001 (prototype)
- Model years: 2022

Body and chassis
- Class: Sports car
- Body style: 2-door coupé
- Layout: 4-wheel drive
- Doors: Scissor

Powertrain
- Engine: 3 electric motors 4 electric motors
- Power output: 1,414–1,903 brake horsepower (1,434–1,929 PS; 1,054–1,419 kW); 1,500–2,000 newton-metres (1,100–1,500 lbf⋅ft)
- Transmission: Front axle: 1-speed automatic Rear axle: 2-speed automatic

Dimensions
- Wheelbase: 2,700 mm
- Length: 4,495 millimetres (177.0 in)
- Width: 2,000 millimetres (79 in)
- Height: 1,055 mm (41.5 in)
- Curb weight: 1,400–1,650 kg (3,090–3,640 lb)

The Elation Freedom is a bespoke sports car developed and manufactured by American California-based automobile manufacturer Elation Motors. Unveiled to the public in mid-November 2020, it is the first car built by the brand.

== Specifications ==
The Freedom is powered an electric powertrain of either three or four electric motors, powered either by a 100 kW or 120 kW battery pack, with 1,414 and 1,903 hp, respectively. The most powerful version of the Freedom, with the four electric-motor powertrain, is claimed to go from 0-60 mph in 1.8 seconds, with a top speed of up to 260 mph, and a top-range estimate of 400 miles on moderate driving. The electric powertrain has a two-speed automatic transmission at the rear axle, similar to that of the Porsche Taycan, only allowing one motor to drive when at lower speeds or when cruising on the highway.

== Design ==
The Freedom, along with its gas-powered twin, was designed with the intent to be a luxury hypercar. The electric powertrain for the Freedom will be supplied by Cascadia Motion, a unit of automotive supplier BorgWarner, which has also supplied electrics motors for Formula E and KERS systems for Formula One. The hardware for the Freedom hypercar will sit in a lightweight carbon-fiber monocoque structure, also featuring an F1-style pushrod suspension, with the overall low profile allowing for a low drag coefficient of 0.28 Cd.

== Unveiling and production ==
The Freedom, along with its gas-powered twin, will first be unveiled at the 2022 Geneva International Motor Show, and production will begin after the debut if there is enough demand, building no more than 25 examples each year, each priced at $2 million.
