= The Free =

- Origin: Germany
- Genres: Eurodance, Pop
- Years active: 1994–1999
- Labels: Dance Pool, Elixir

The Free were a German eurodance group from the 1990s. They were produced by Felix J. Gauder and Olaf Roberto Bossi.

== Members ==
- 1994–1995: Iris Trevisan
- 1995–1996: Ayla J.
- 1994–1999: Charles Simmons

== Discography ==
The Free discography
- Studio albums: 1
- Singles: 6
- Music videos: 4

=== Studio albums ===
- 1996: Crazy Worlds

=== Singles ===
Title	Year	Peak chart positions
Title	Year	GER
"Born Crazy"	1994	44
"Lover on the Line"	1994	48
"Dance The Night Away"	1995	45
"Shout"	1996	47
"Loveletter From Space"	1996	58
"Fly"	1999	—
"—" denotes singles which were not released in that country or failed to chart.
