= Freedom, Maryland =

Unincorporated community in Maryland, United States

Freedom
- Unincorporated community
- Country: United States
- State: Maryland
- County: Carroll
- Time zone: UTC-5 (Eastern (EST))
  - Summer (DST): UTC-4 (EDT)

Freedom is an unincorporated community located in Carroll County, Maryland, United States. It is part of the Baltimore metropolitan area.
