= Yinxiang Group =

Industrial company based in Chongqing, China

- Product type: real estate and research, development, manufacturing and sales of motorcycles, gasoline engines and general-purpose engines and equipments.
- Country: China
- Introduced: 1997; 29 years ago
- Website: www.yinxianggroup.com

The Yinxiang Group (银翔) is an industrial company based in Chongqing, China, specializing in real estate and research, development, manufacturing and sales of motorcycles, passenger vehicles, gasoline engines and general-purpose engines and equipment.

== Brands ==
=== Yinxiang Motorcycle ===
The Yinxiang Motorcycle (Chinese: 银翔摩托; pinyin: Yínxiáng Móto) was founded in 1997. It is the motorcycle brand of Yinxiang Group.

=== Huansu (discontinued) ===
BAIC Yinxiang's sub-brand Huansu, also spelled Hyosow, is a joint venture brand between the BAIC Group and Yinxiang Group that sells passenger cars. Production ceased in 2018 when the Yinxiang Group was in financial problems and failed to restart production in 2019. The Yinxiang Group finally declared bankruptcy in 2021 with products rebranded under the Ruixiang brand.

- Huansu C60
- Huansu H2
- Huansu H3
- Huansu H3F
- Huansu H5
- Huansu H6
- Huansu S2
- Huansu S3
- Huansu S3L
- Huansu S5
- Huansu S6
- Huansu S7
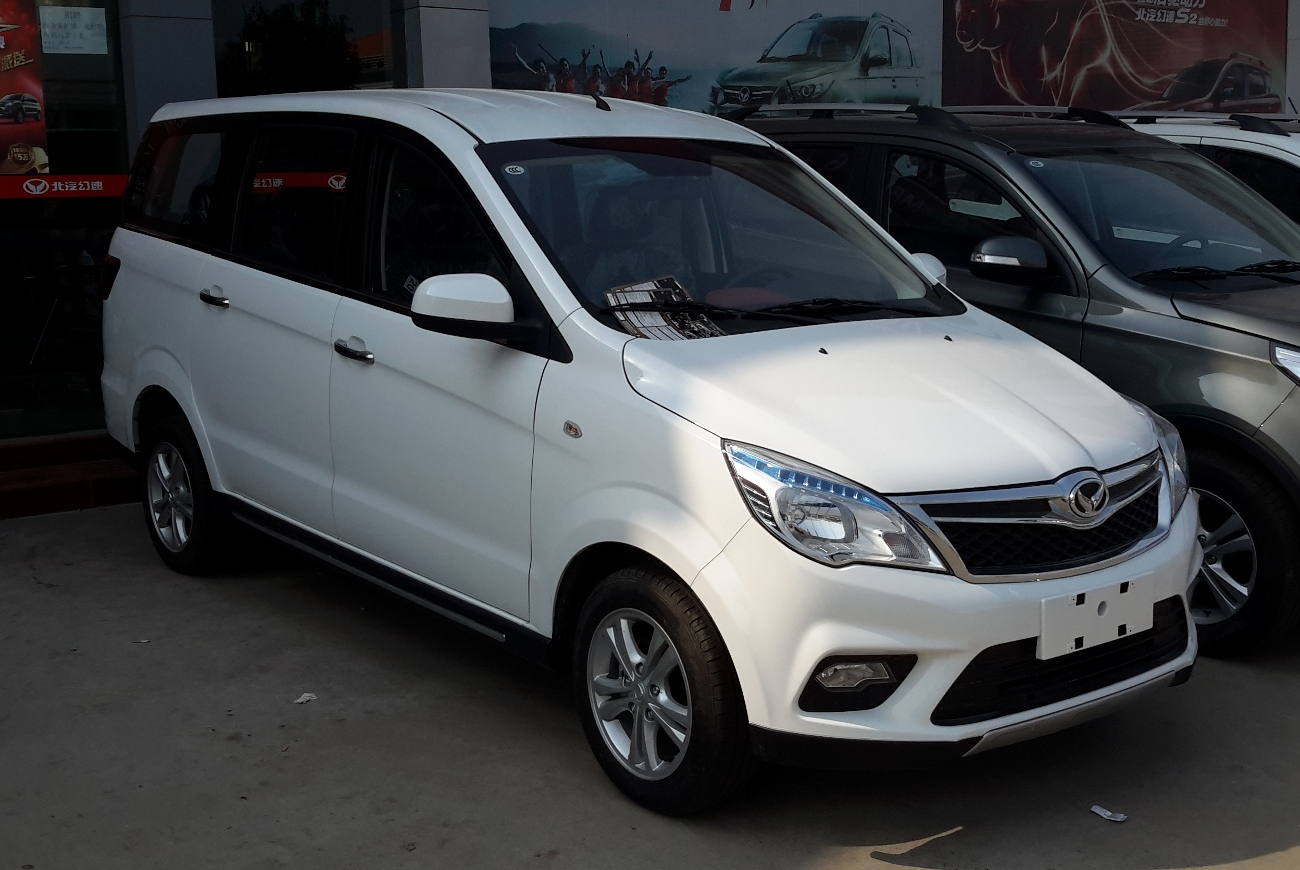
Huansu H2

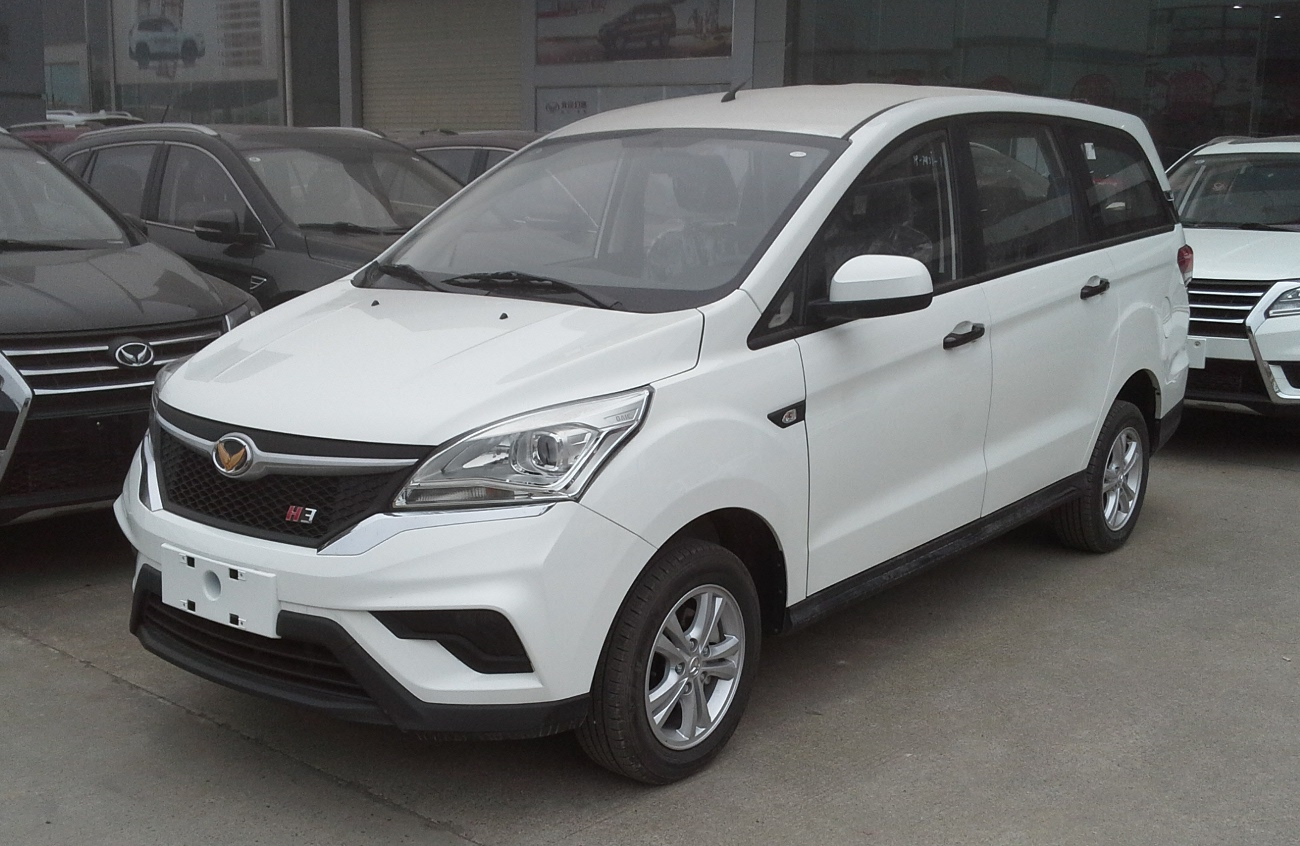
Huansu H3

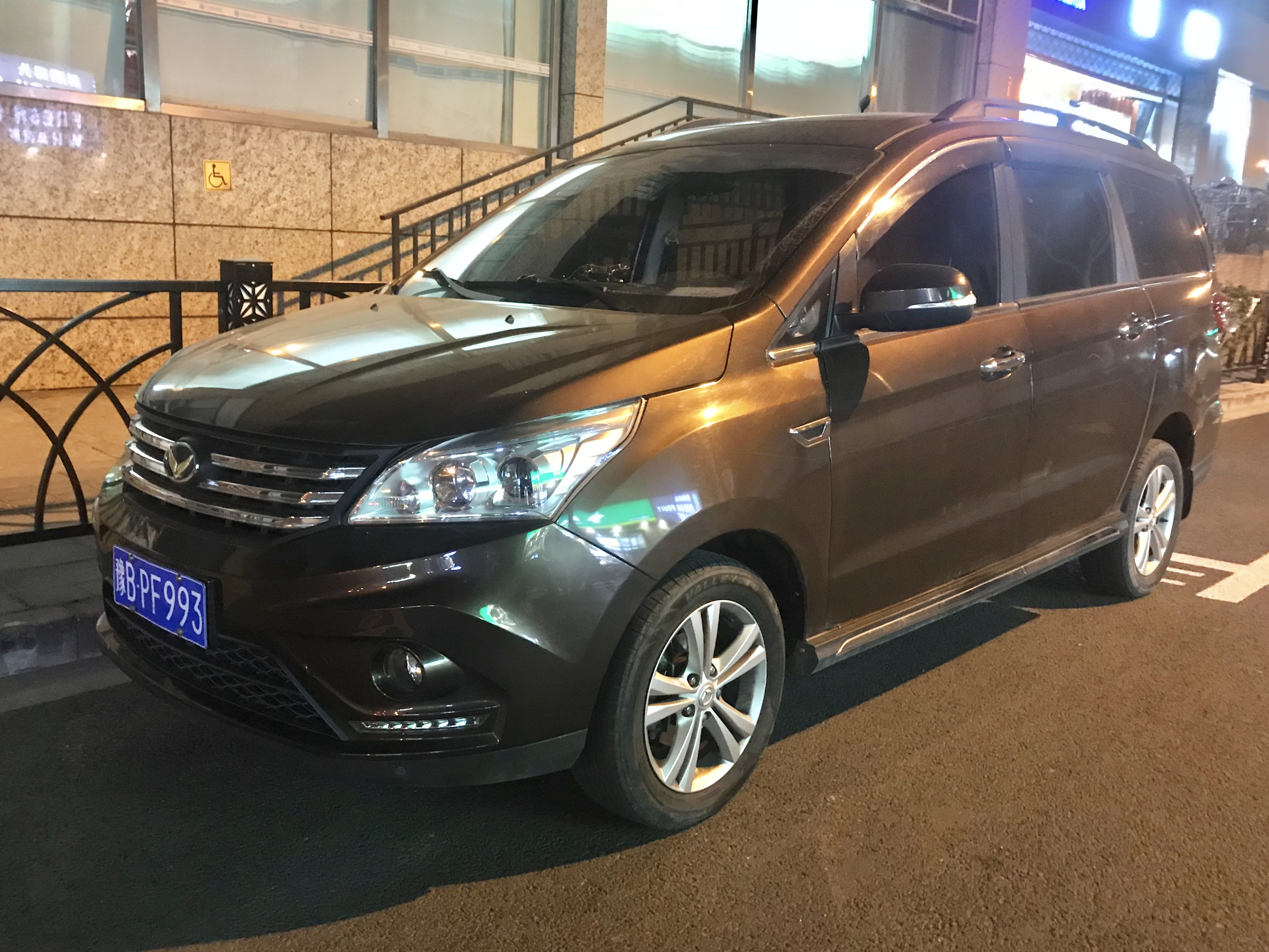
Huansu H3F

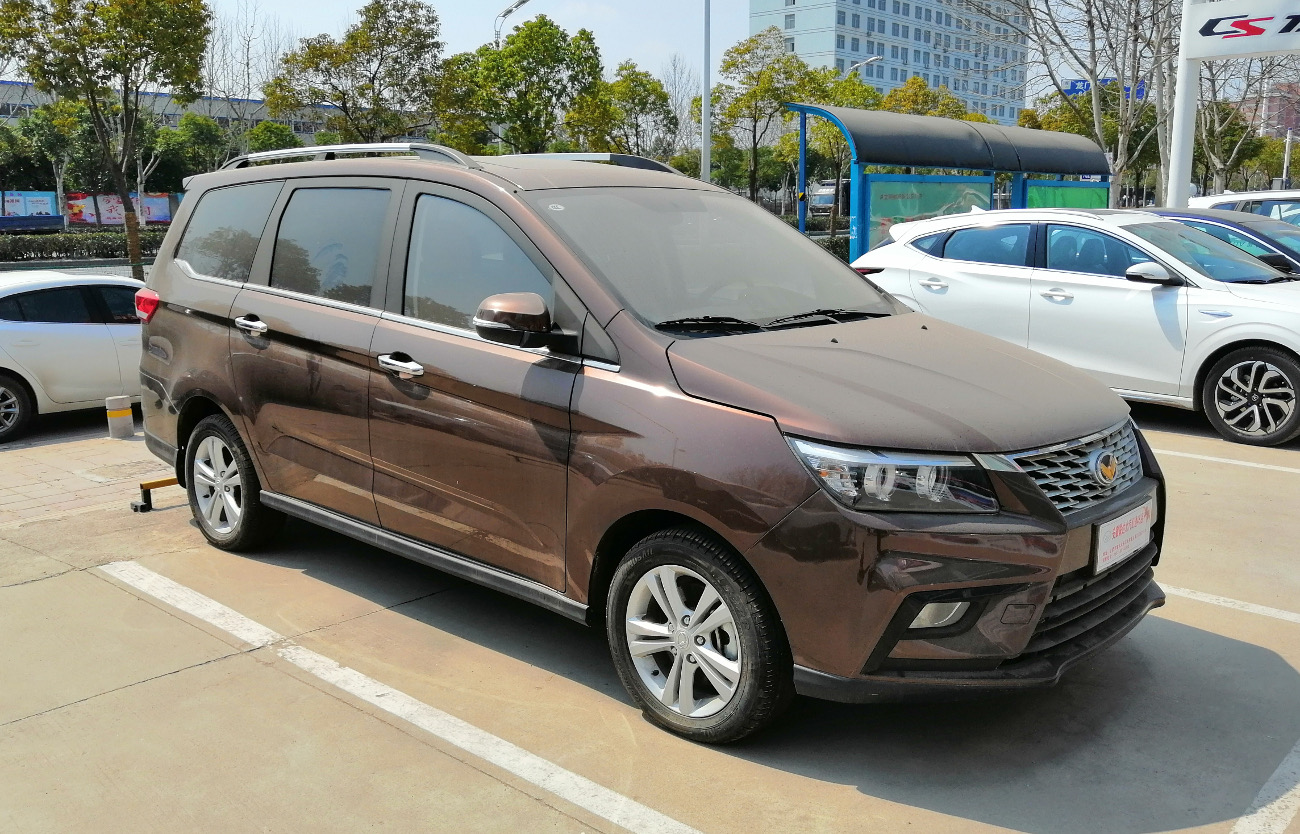
Huansu H5

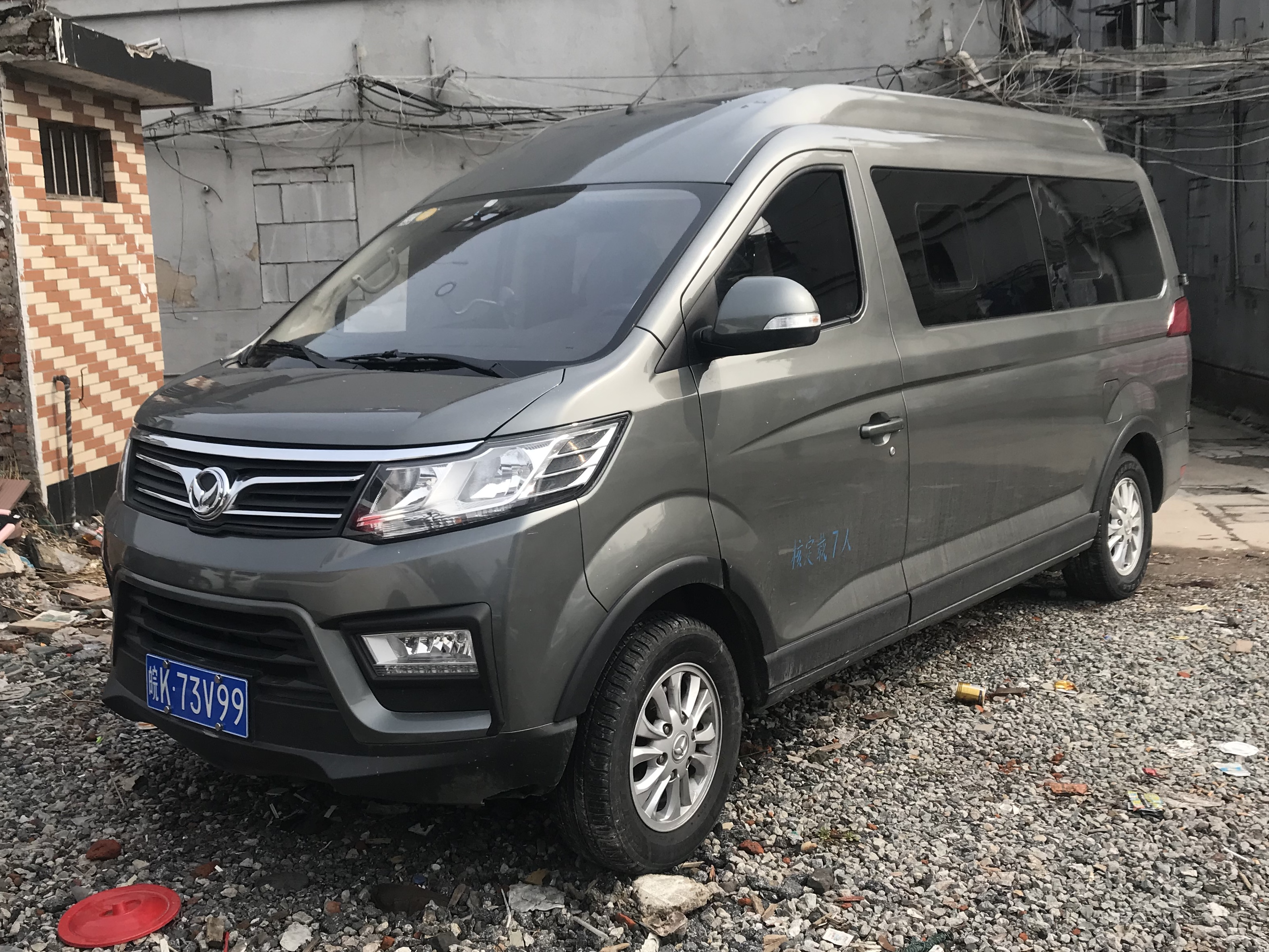
Huansu H6

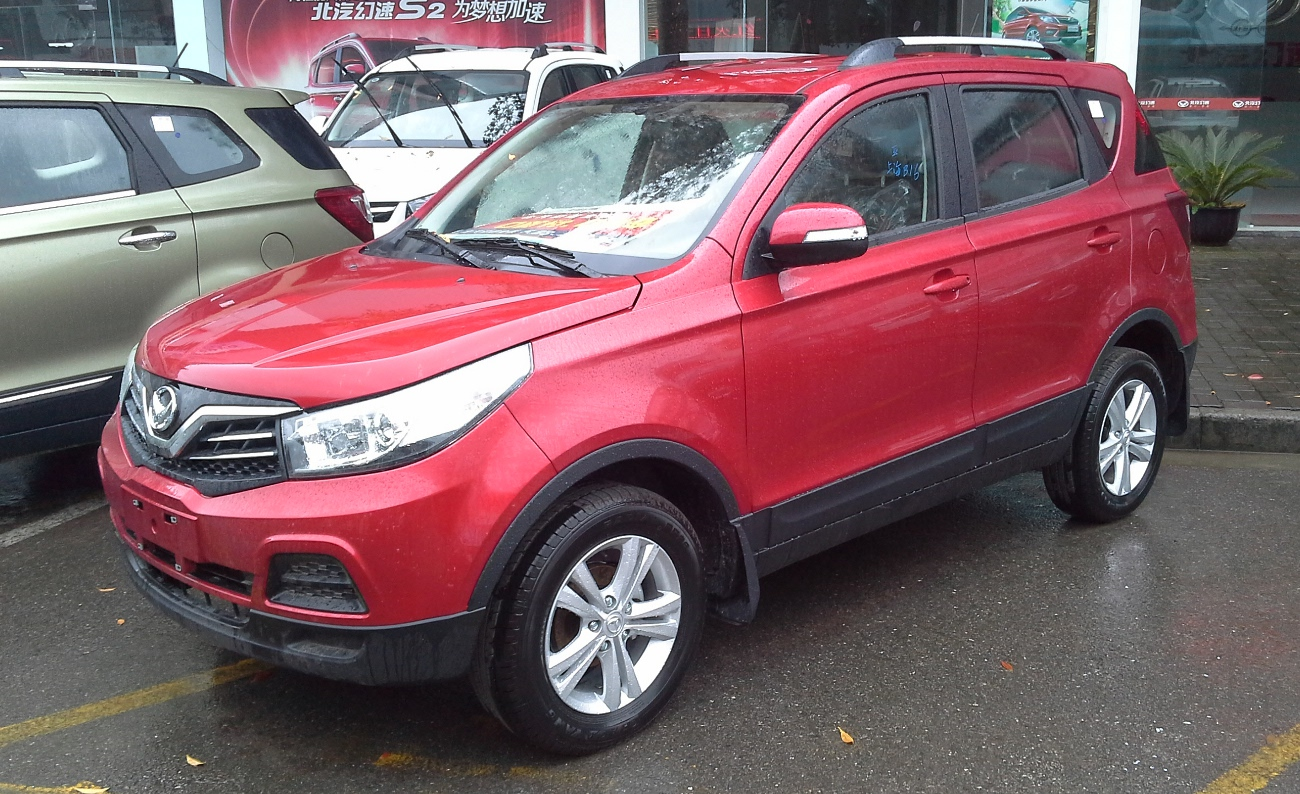
Huansu S2

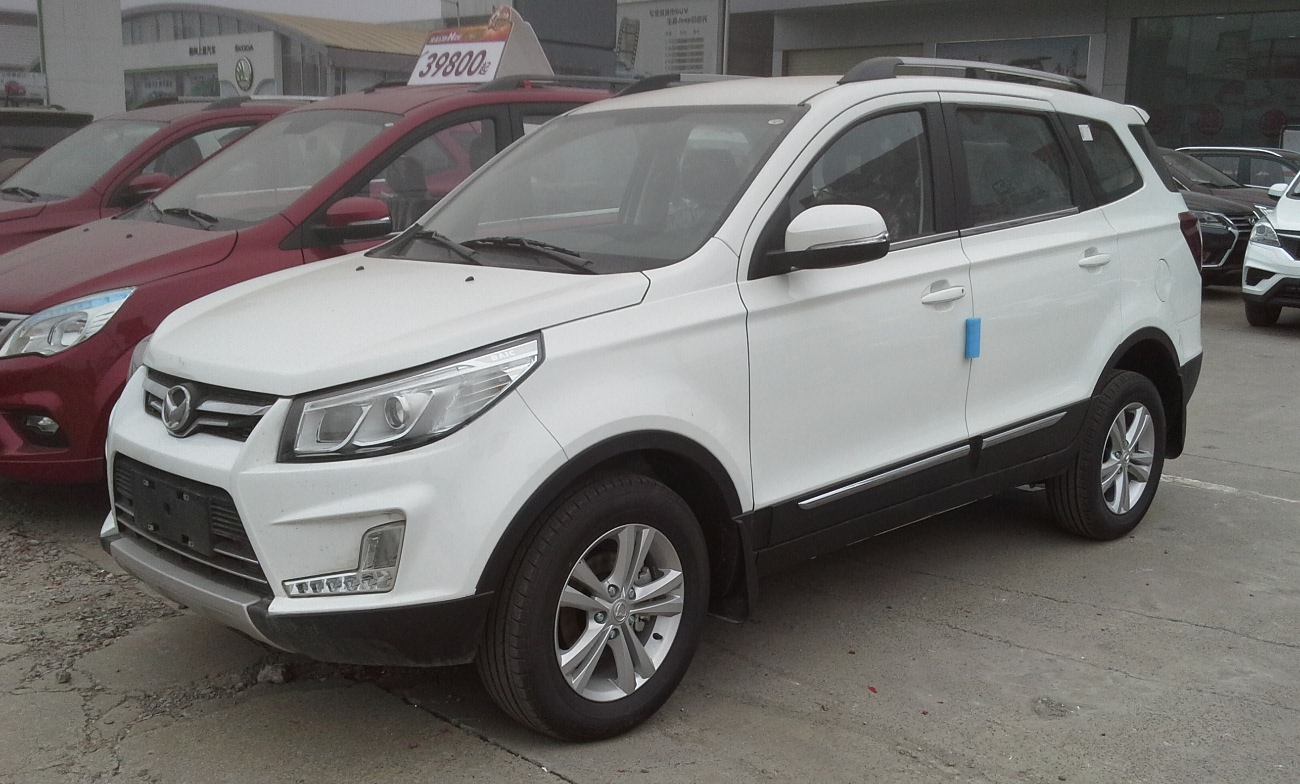
Huansu S3

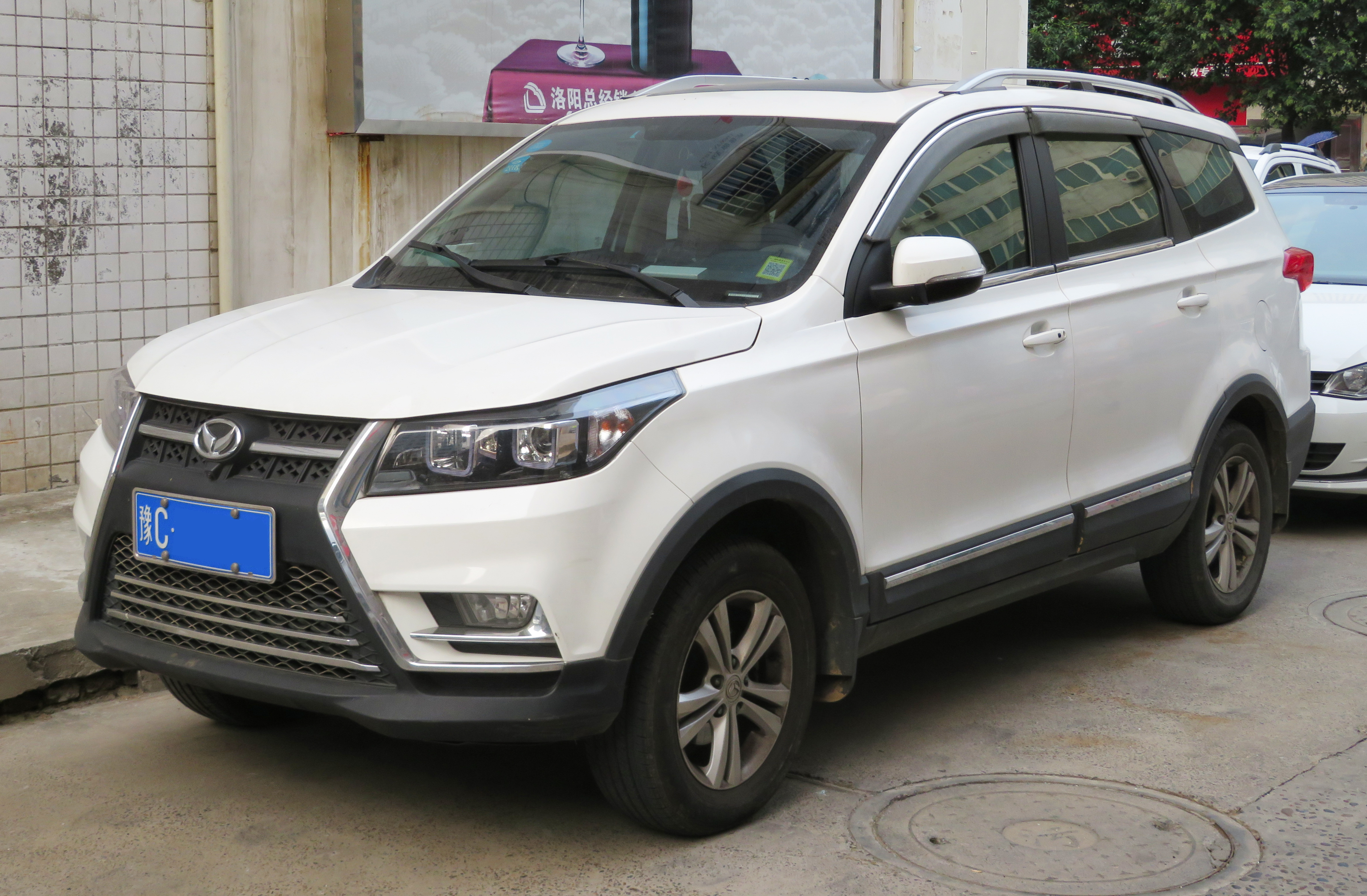
Huansu S3L

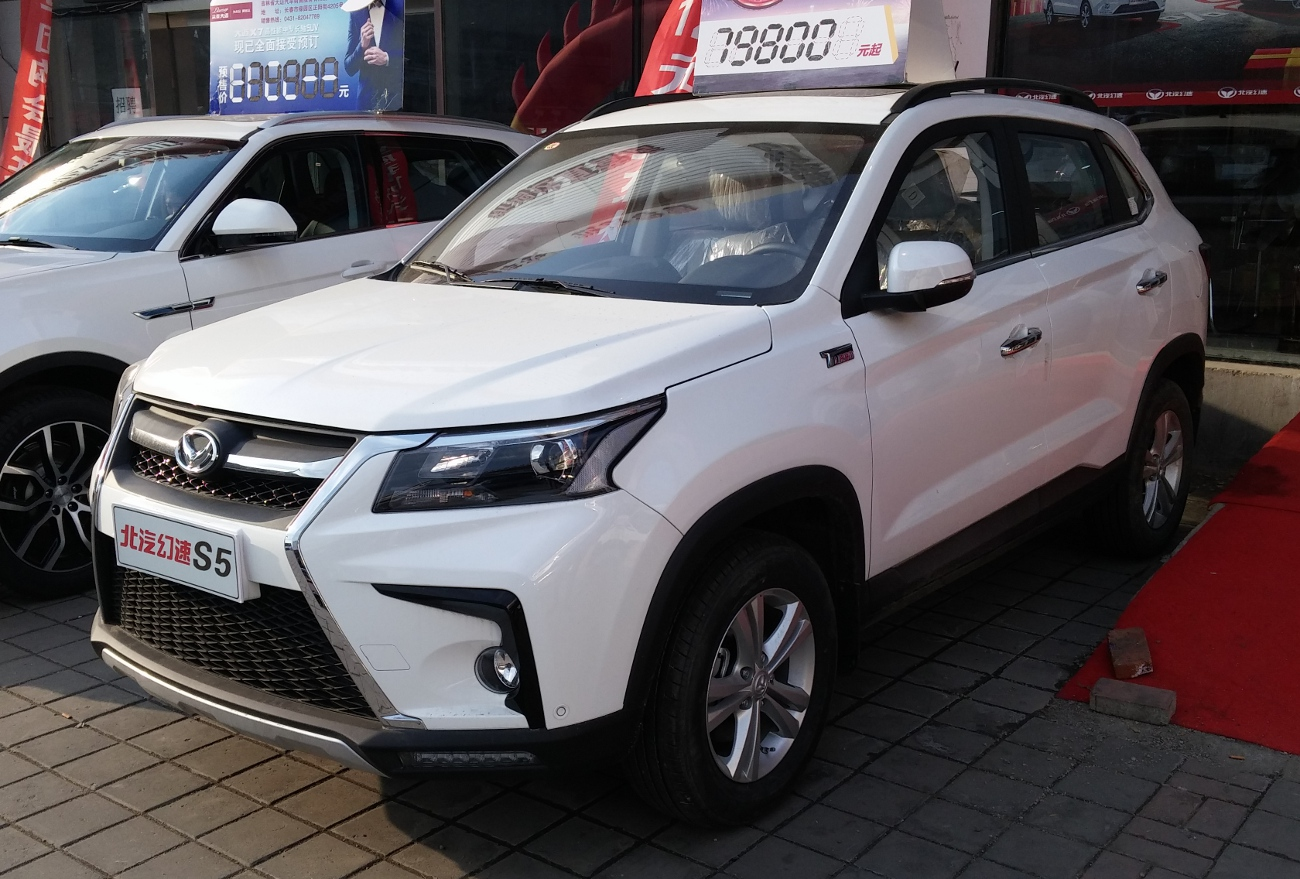
Huansu S5

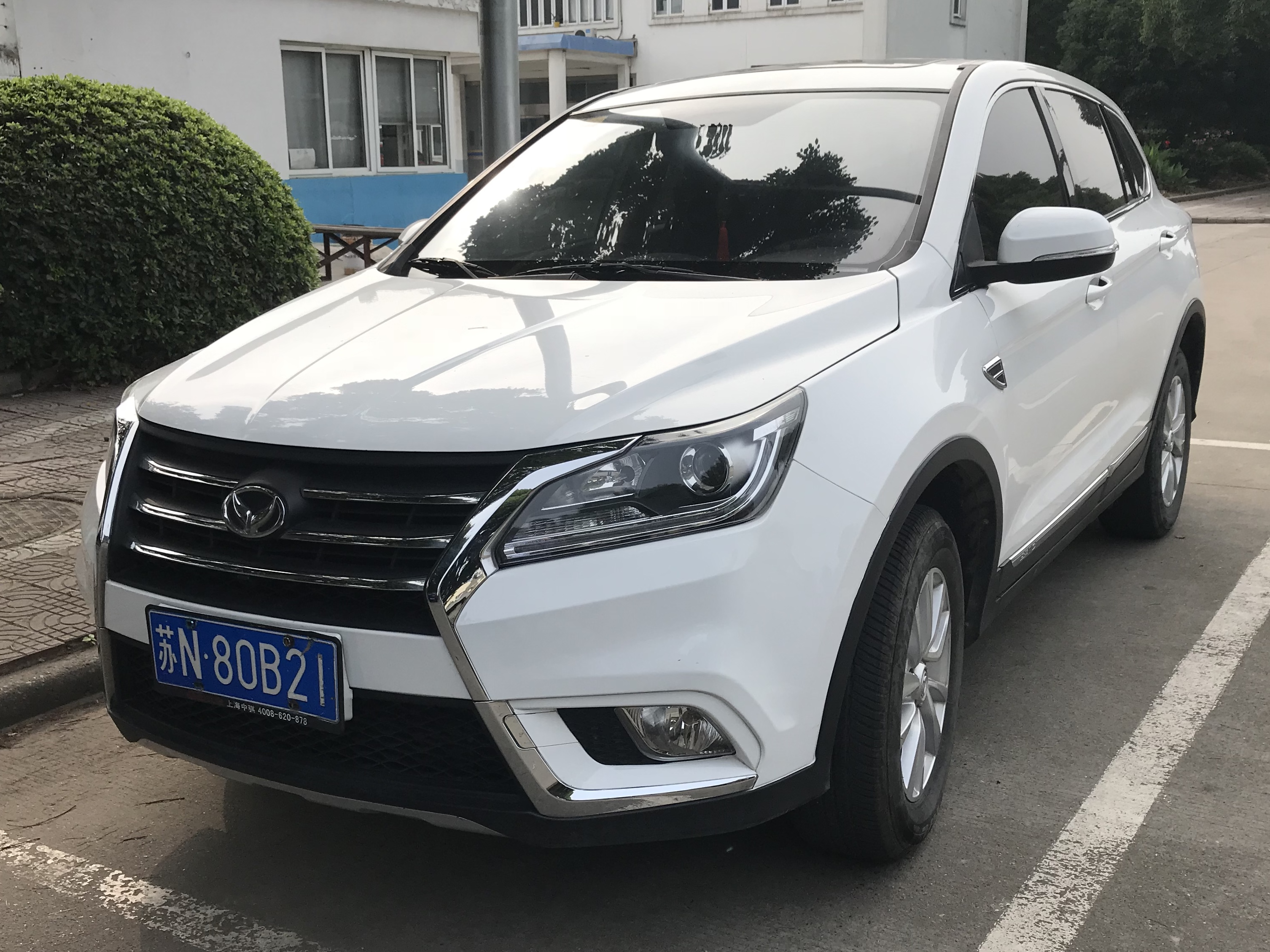
Huansu S6

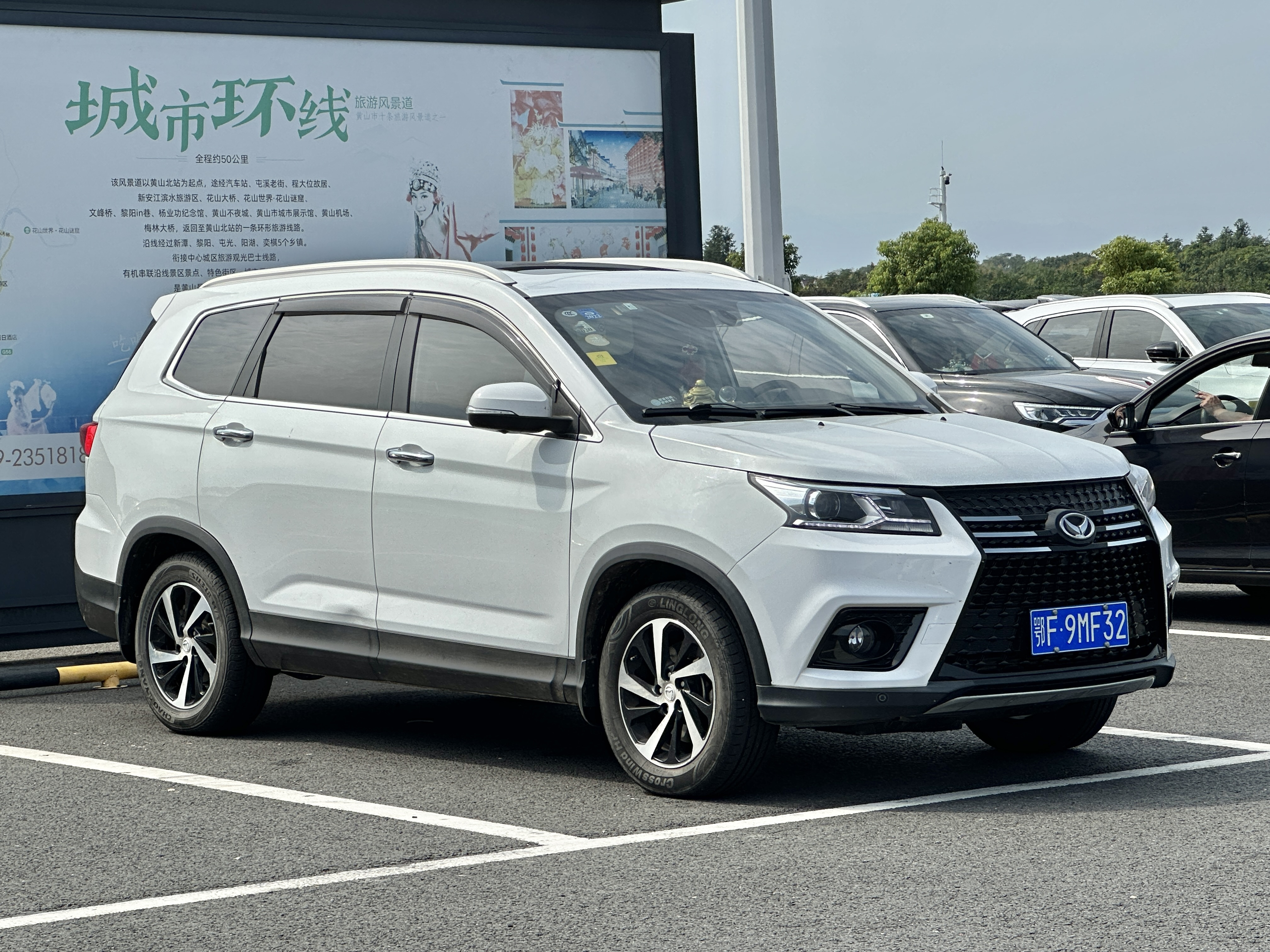
Huansu S7

=== Bisu (discontinued) ===
With the experience of the BAIC Yinxiang joint venture, the Bisu brand was created. Bisu is a brand that sells crossovers and MPVs. When the T3 and T5 were discontinued in 2020, the brand was also discontinued.

- Bisu M3 (2016–2019)
- Bisu T3 (2016–2020)
- Bisu T5 (2016–2020)
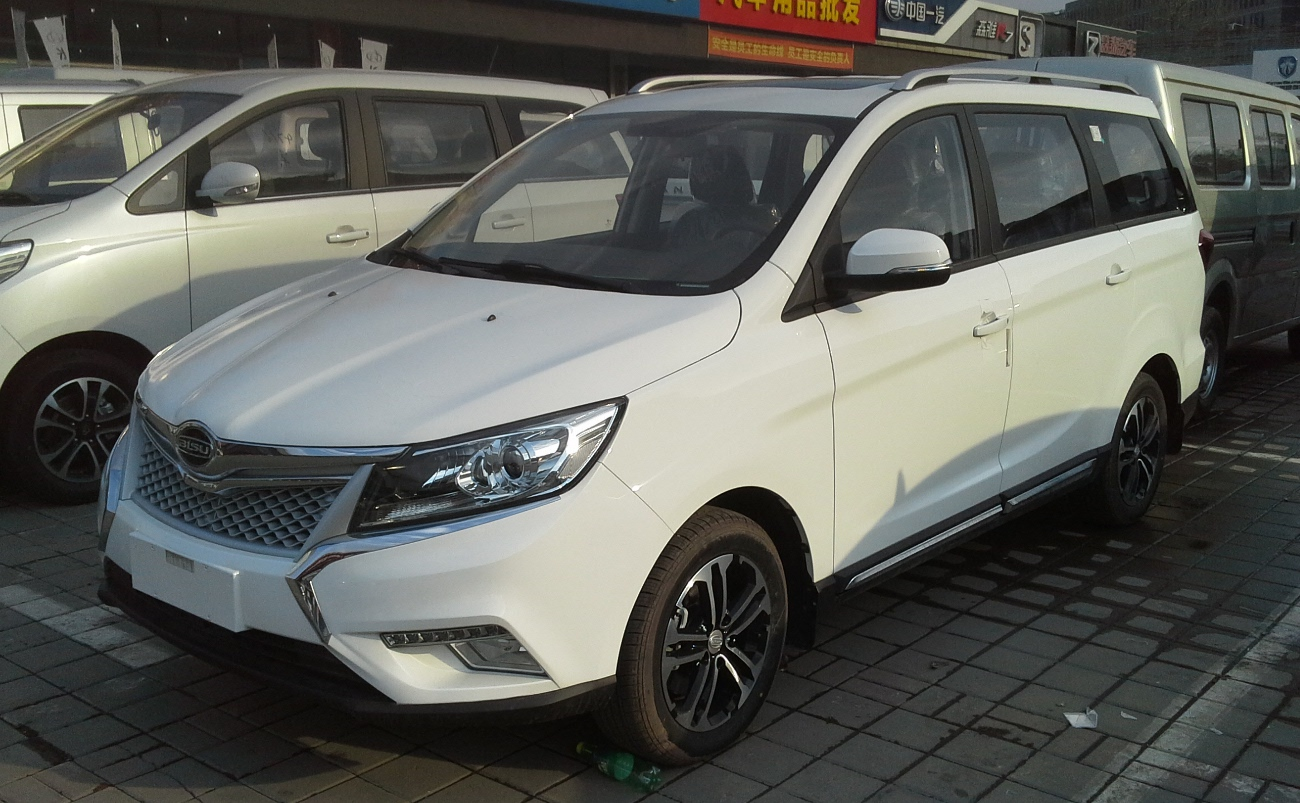
Bisu M3

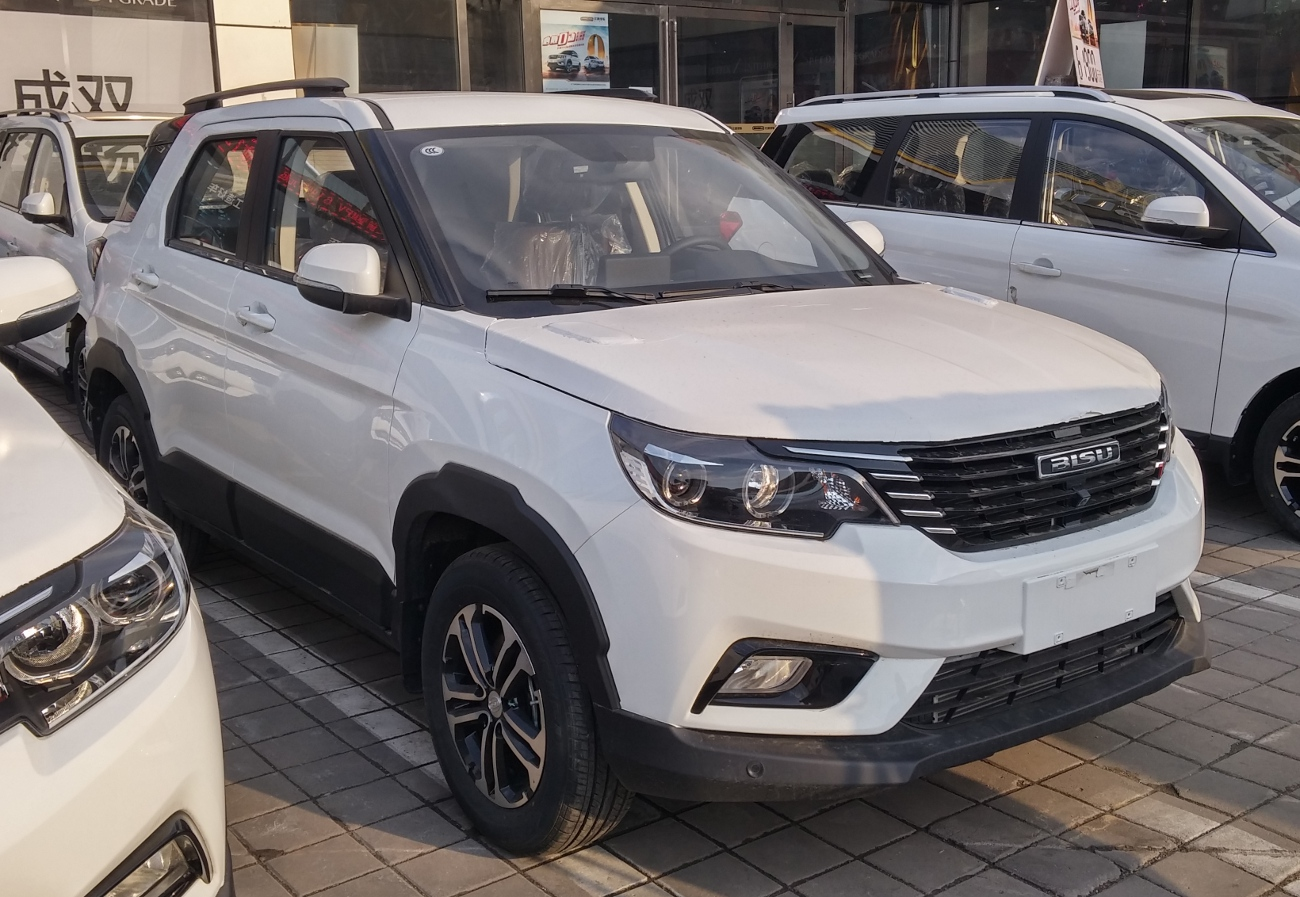
Bisu T3

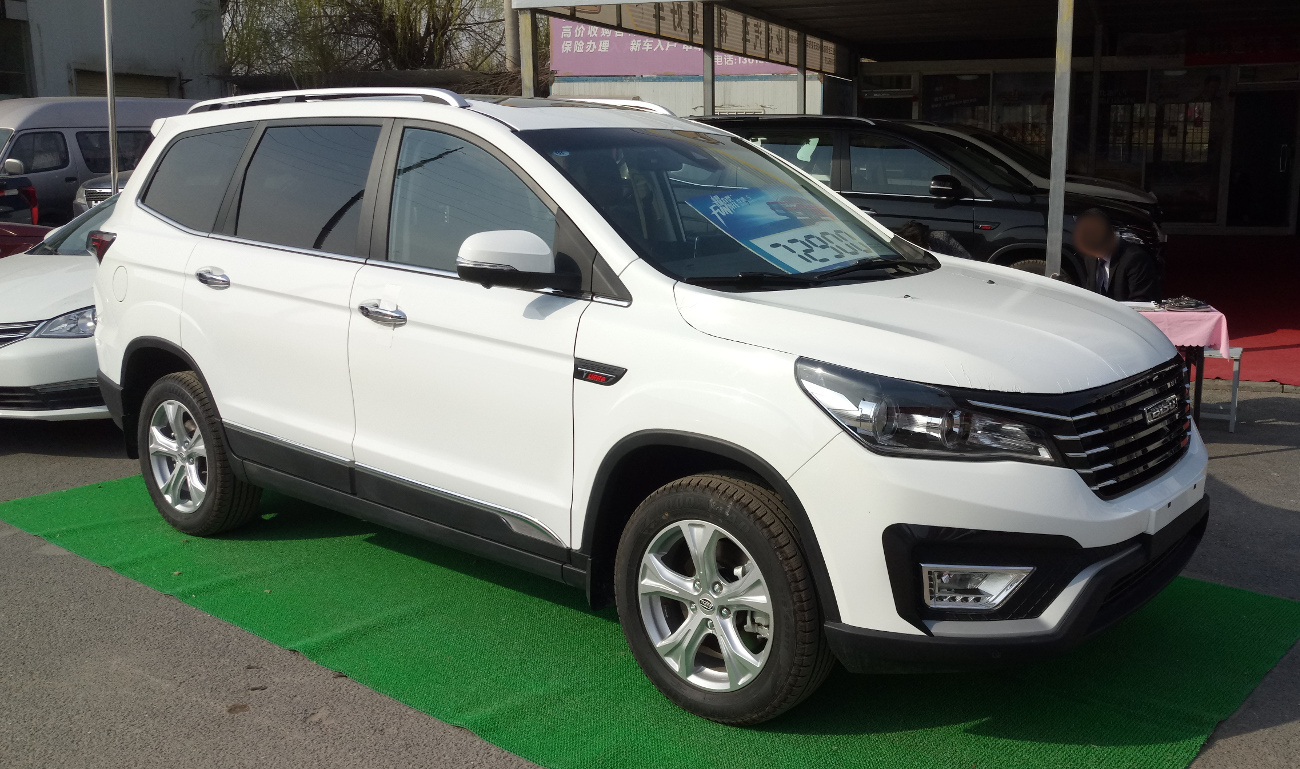
Bisu T5

=== Weiwang ===
Weiwang is a brand under the Beiqi (BAIC) Yinxiang Automobile joint venture that focuses on compact MPVs, CUVs, and minivans.

- Weiwang 205
- Weiwang 306
- Weiwang 307
- Weiwang 407 EV
- Weiwang M20
- Weiwang M30
- Weiwang M35
- Weiwang M50F
- Weiwang M60
- Weiwang S50
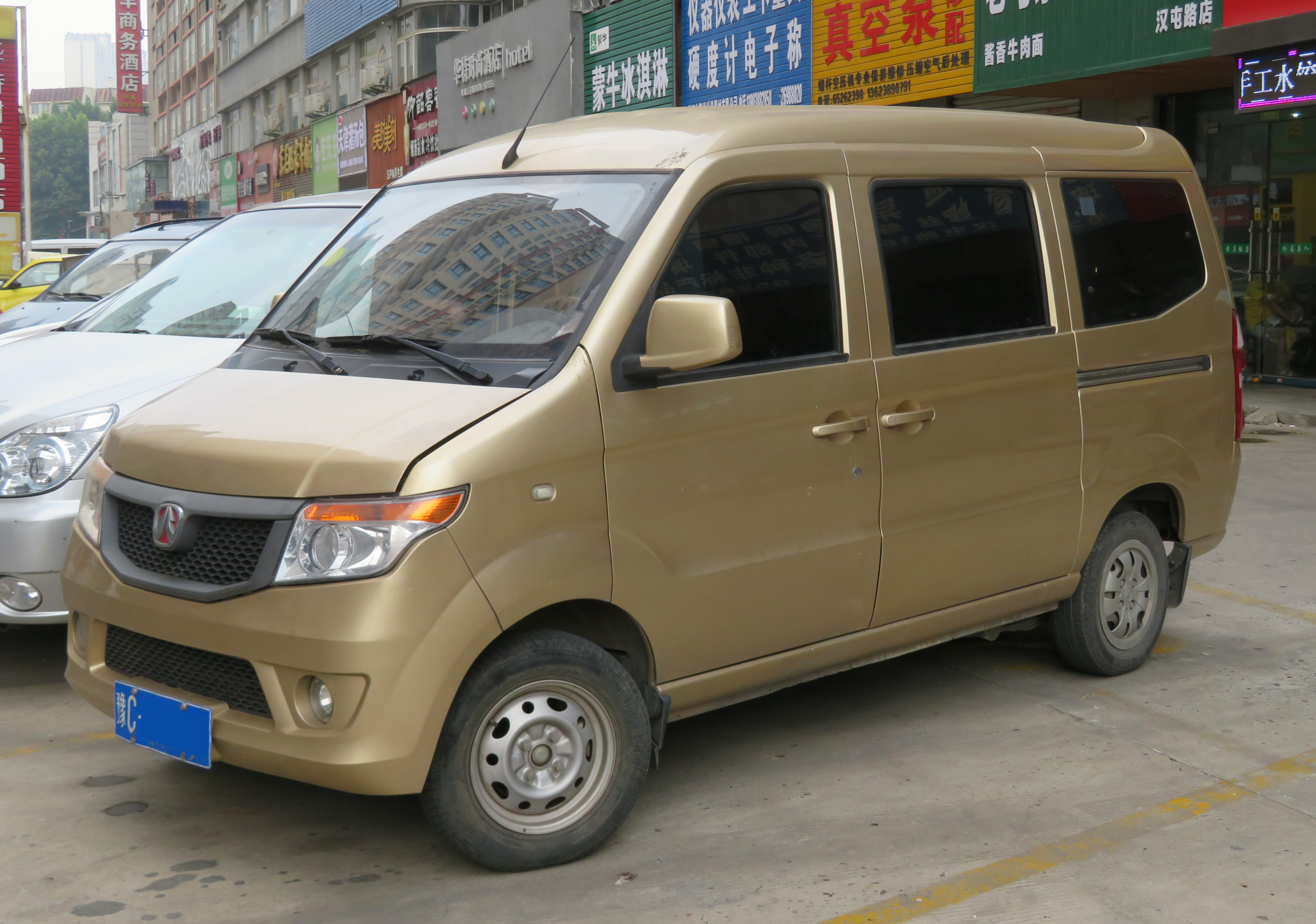
Weiwang 205

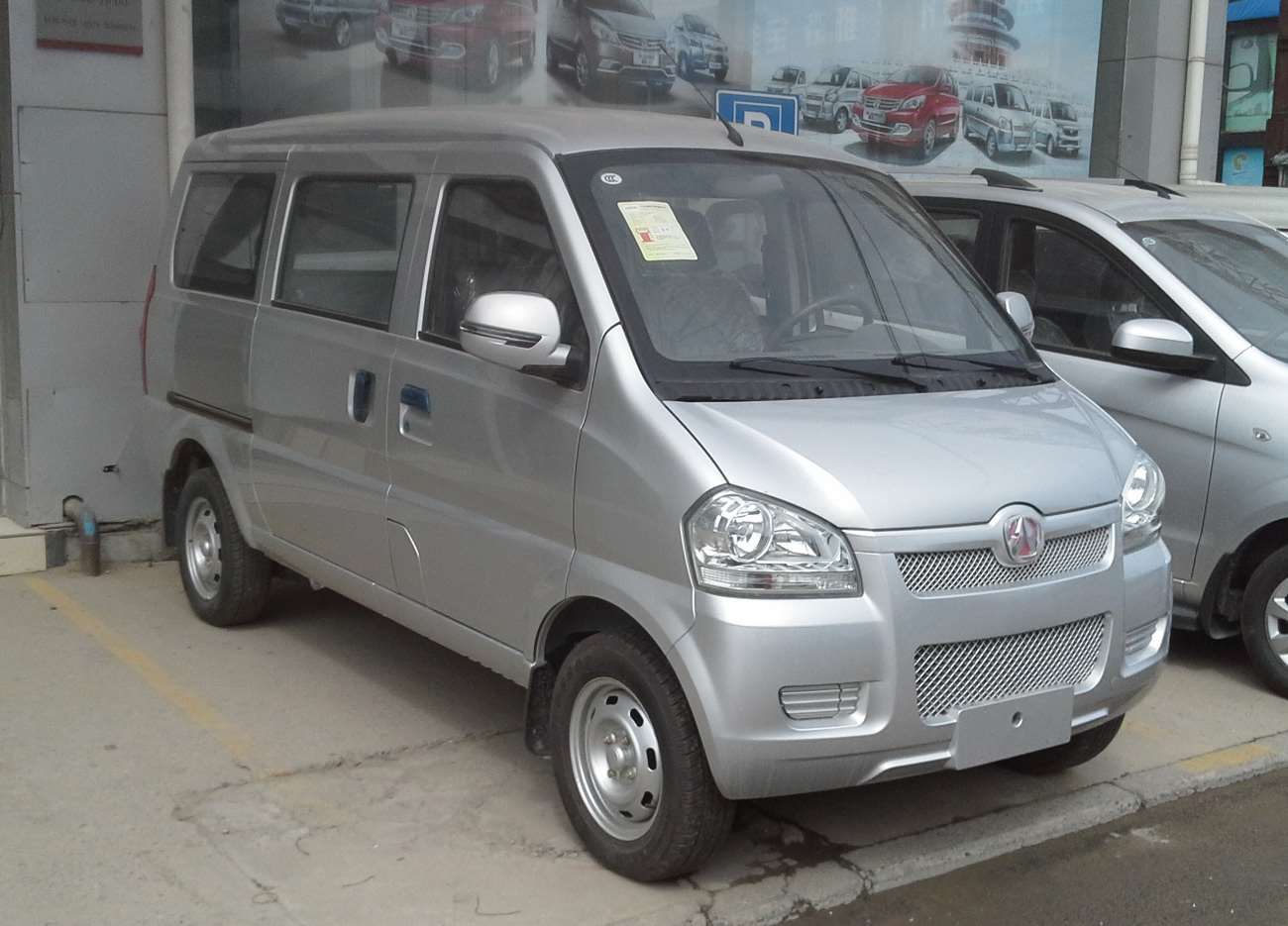
Weiwang 306

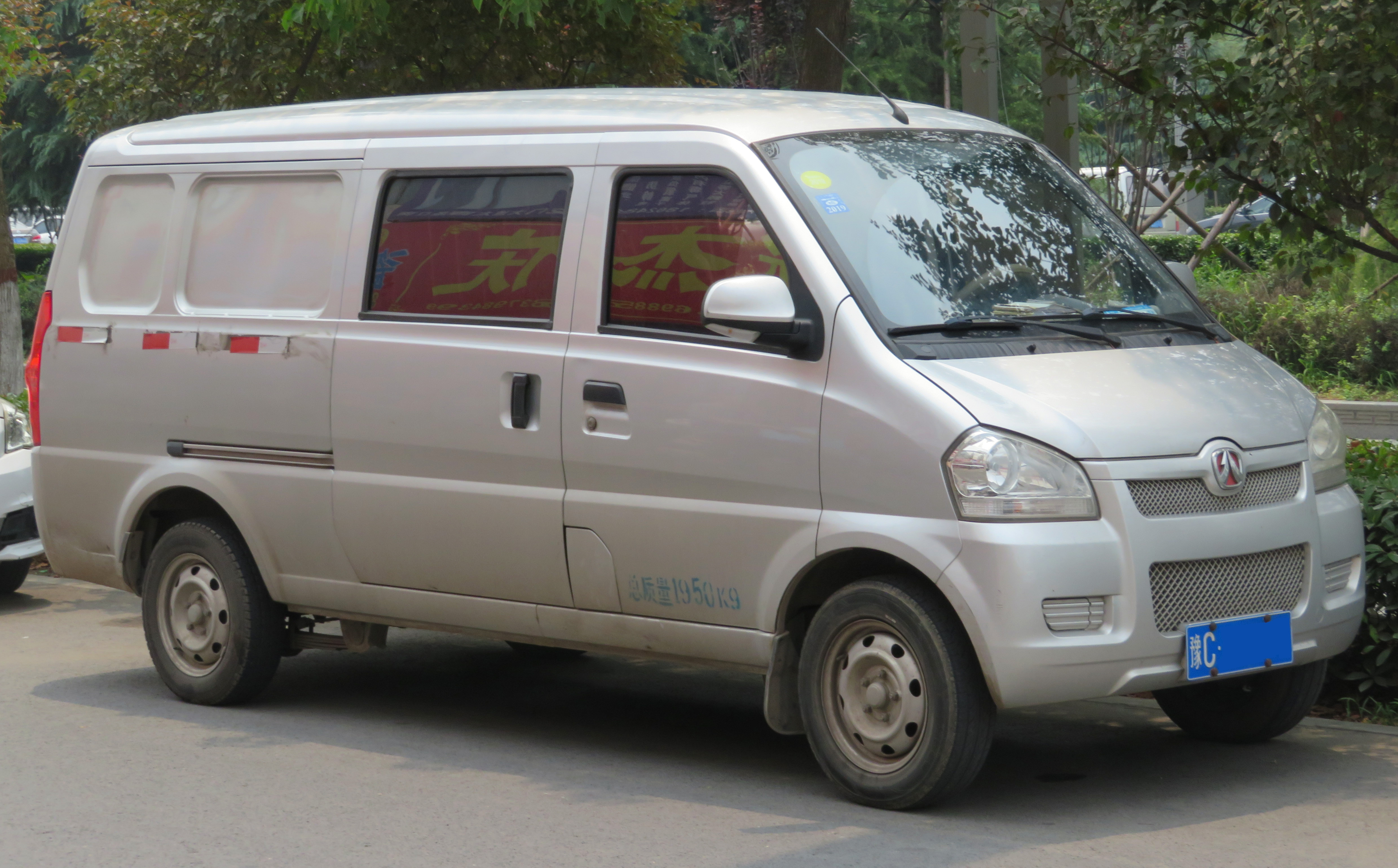
Weiwang 307

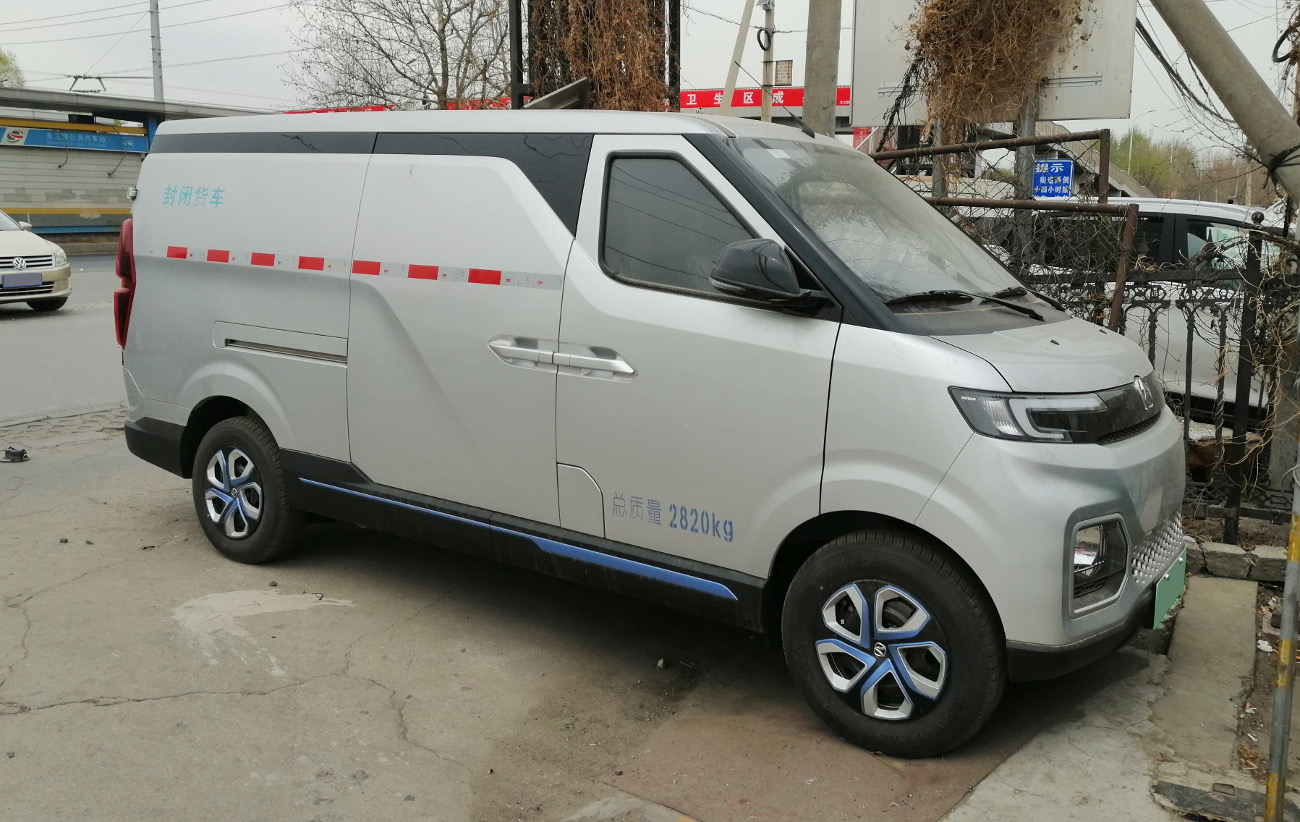
Weiwang 407 EV

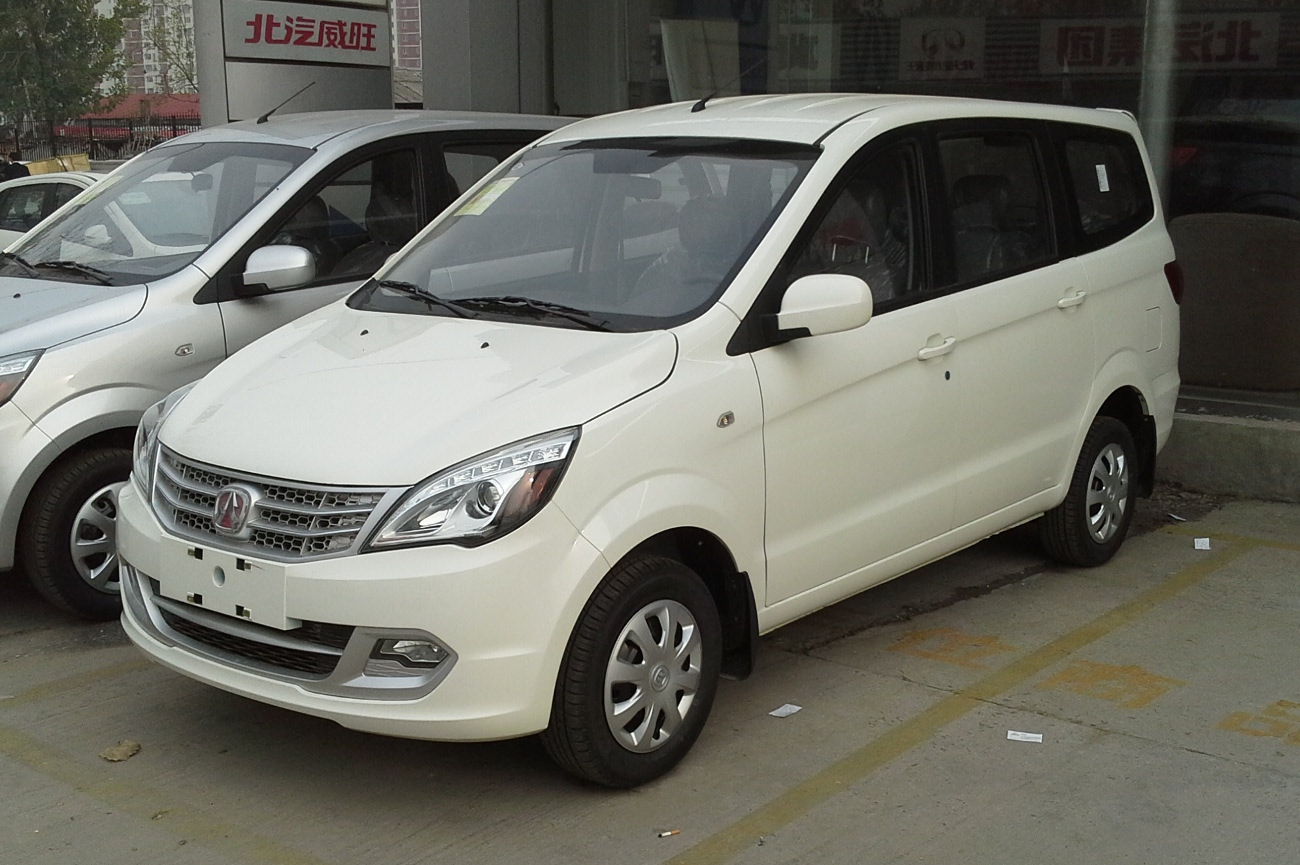
Weiwang M20

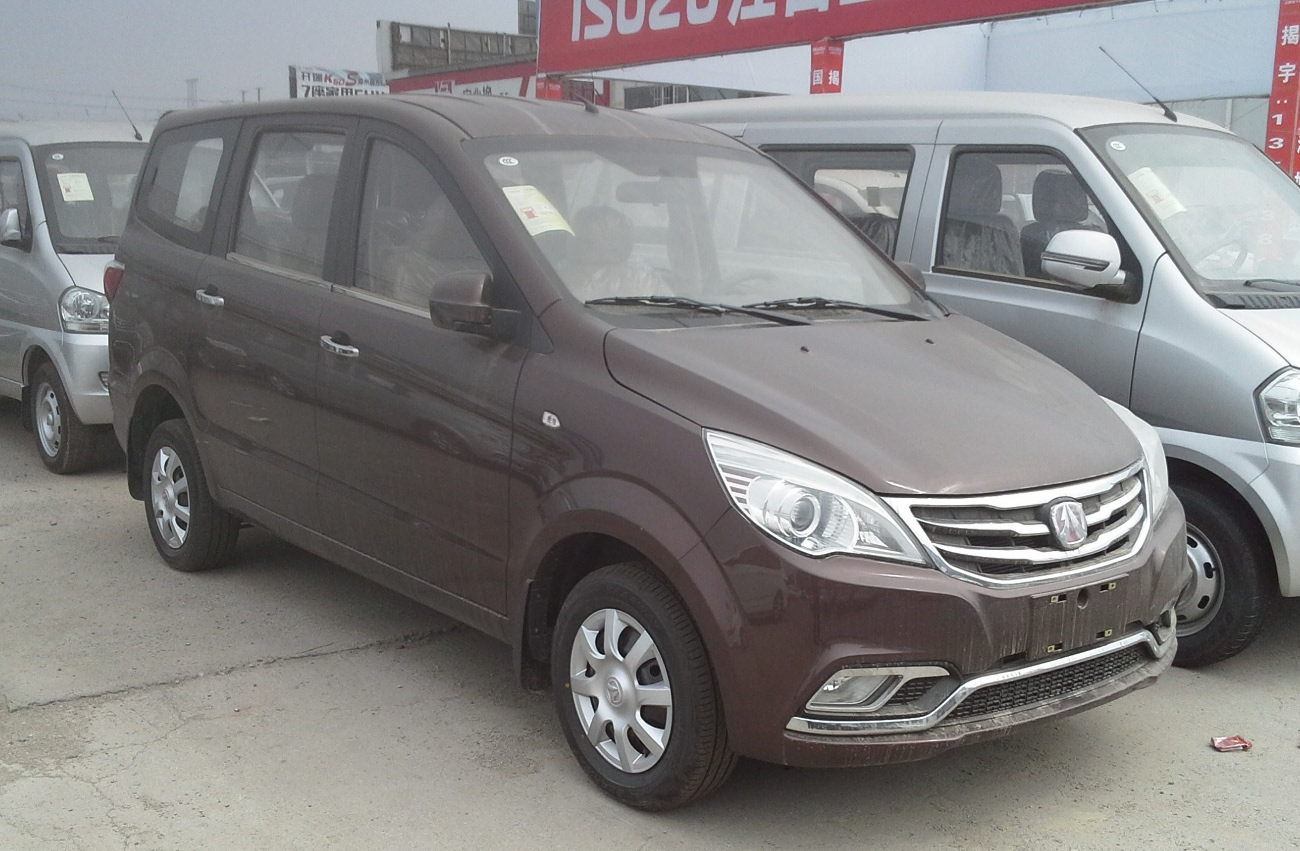
Weiwang M30

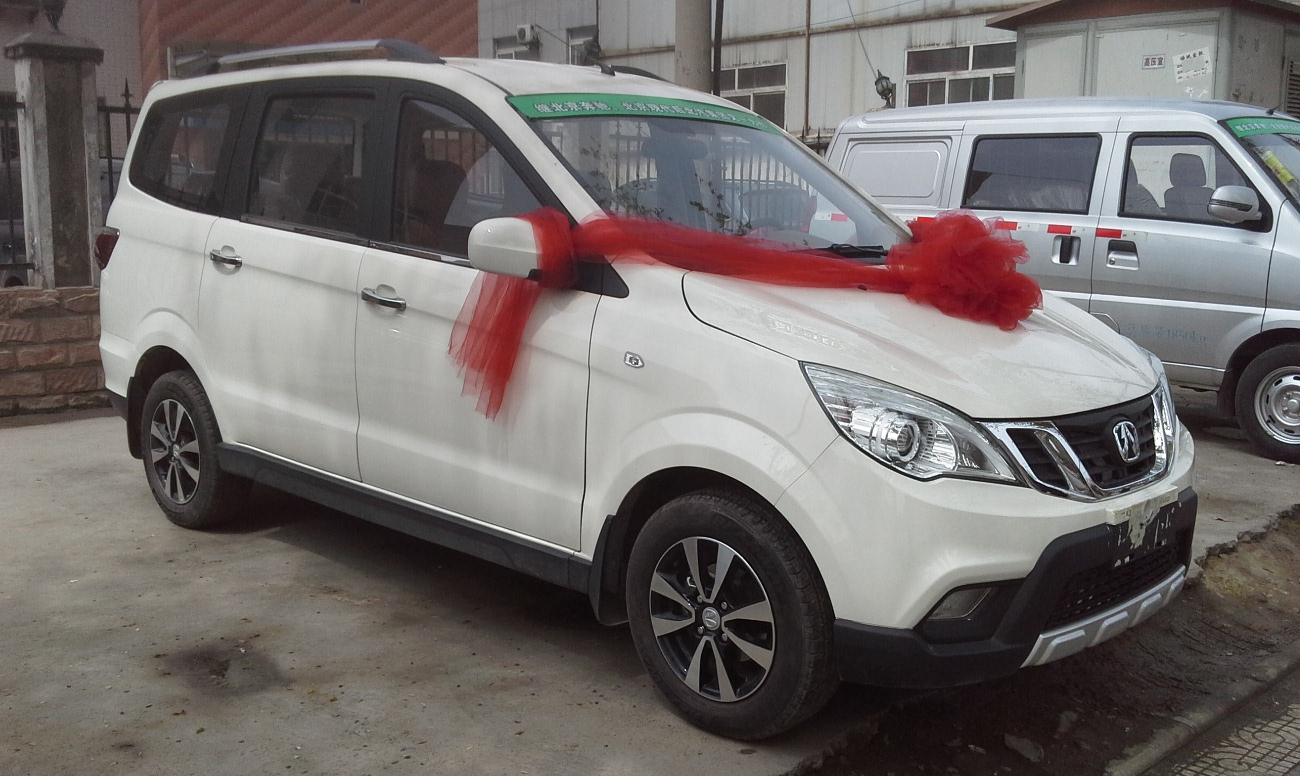
Weiwang M35

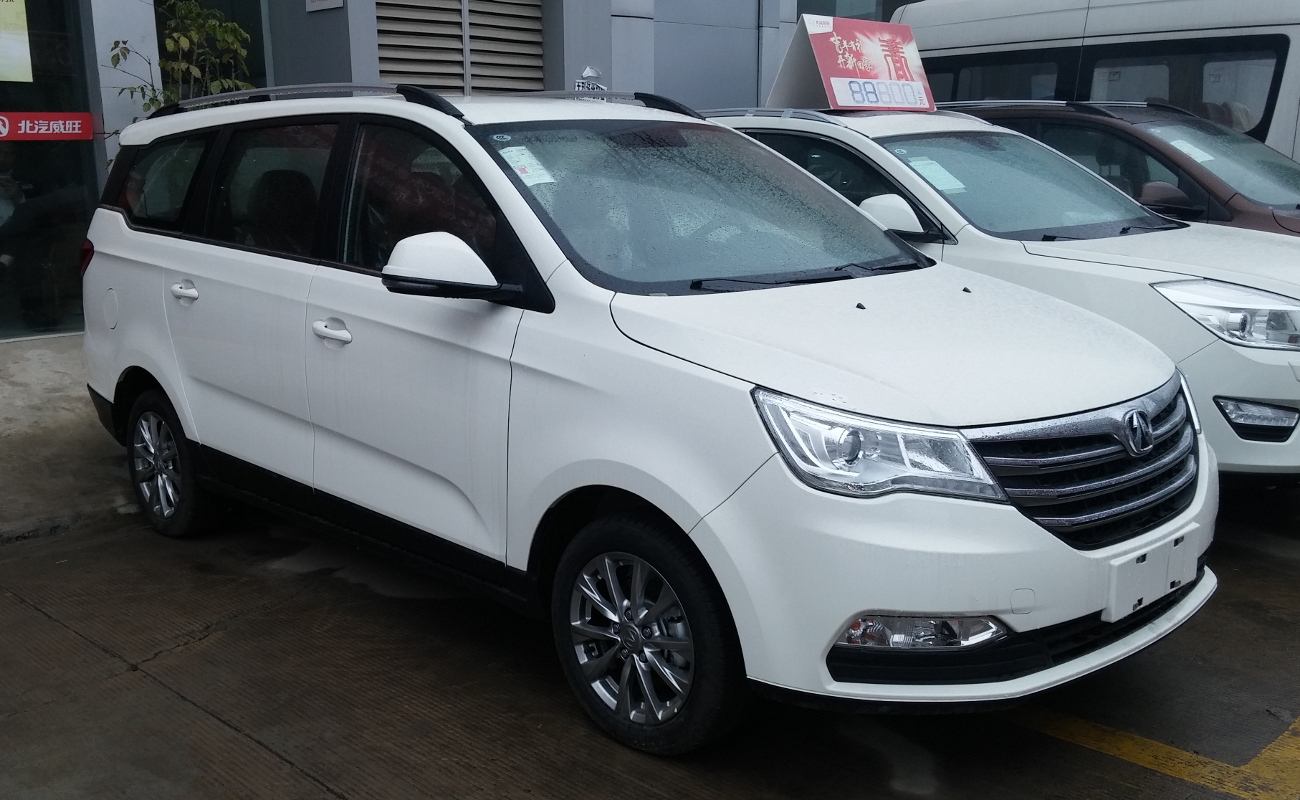
Weiwang M50F

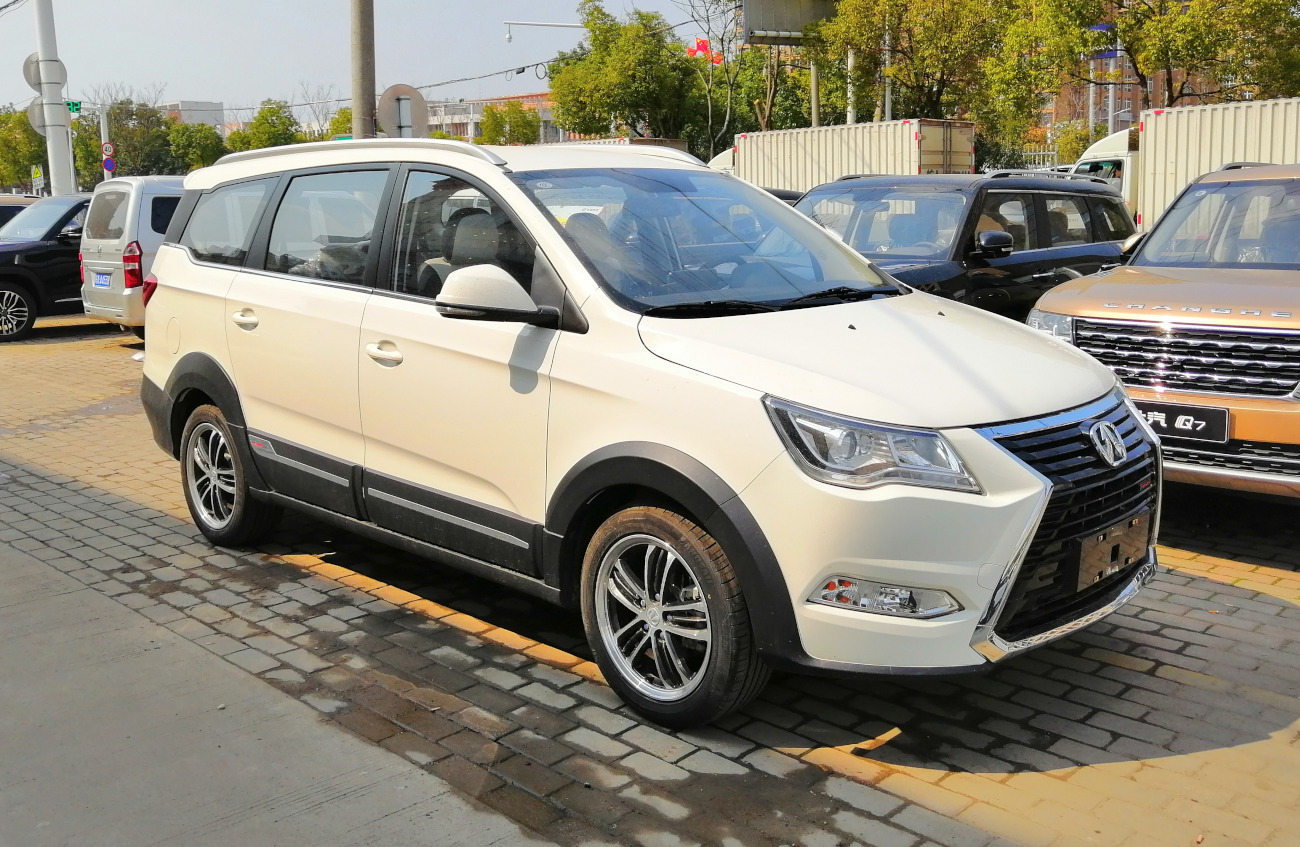
Weiwang M60

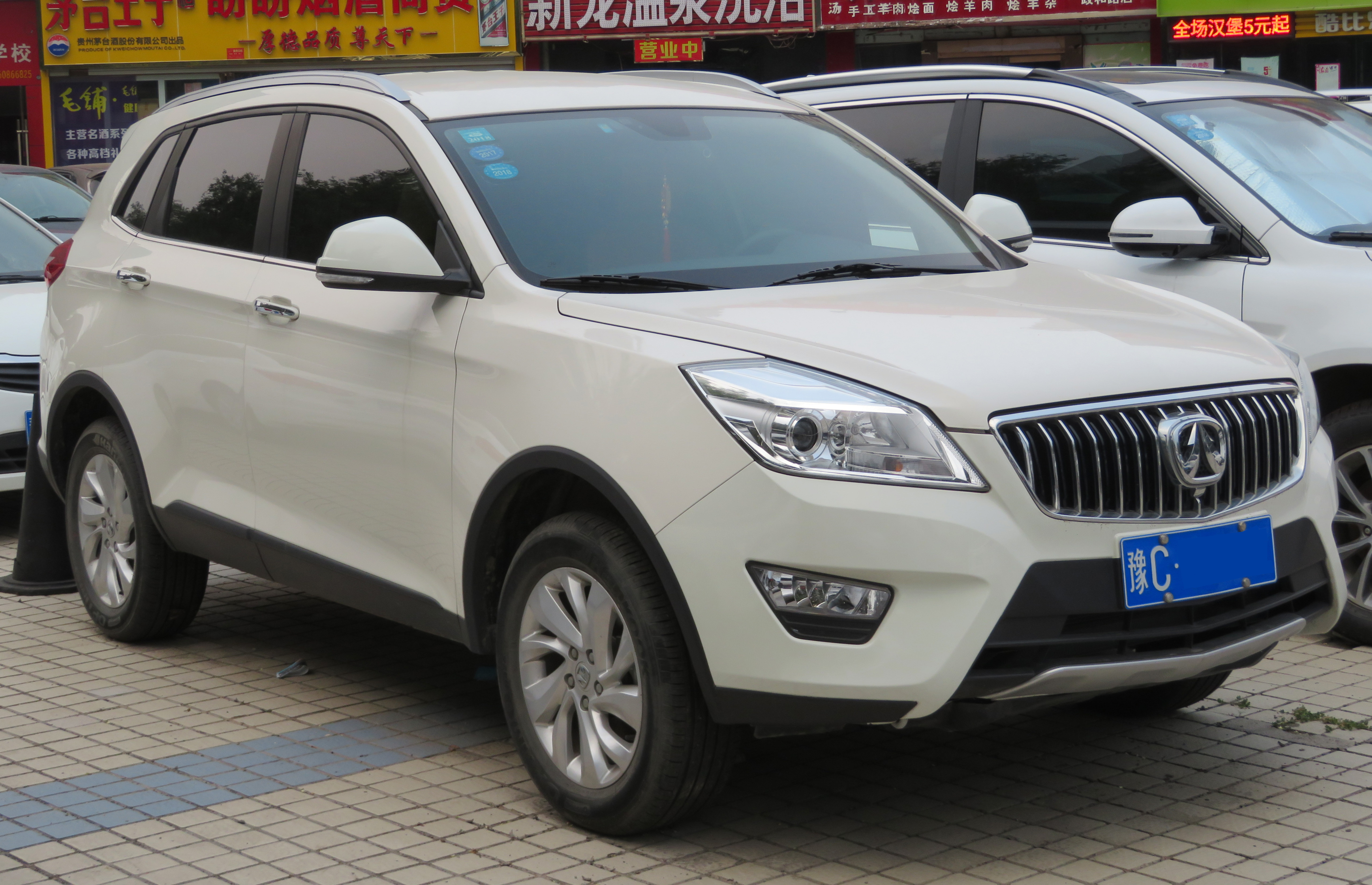
Weiwang S50

=== Ruixiang ===
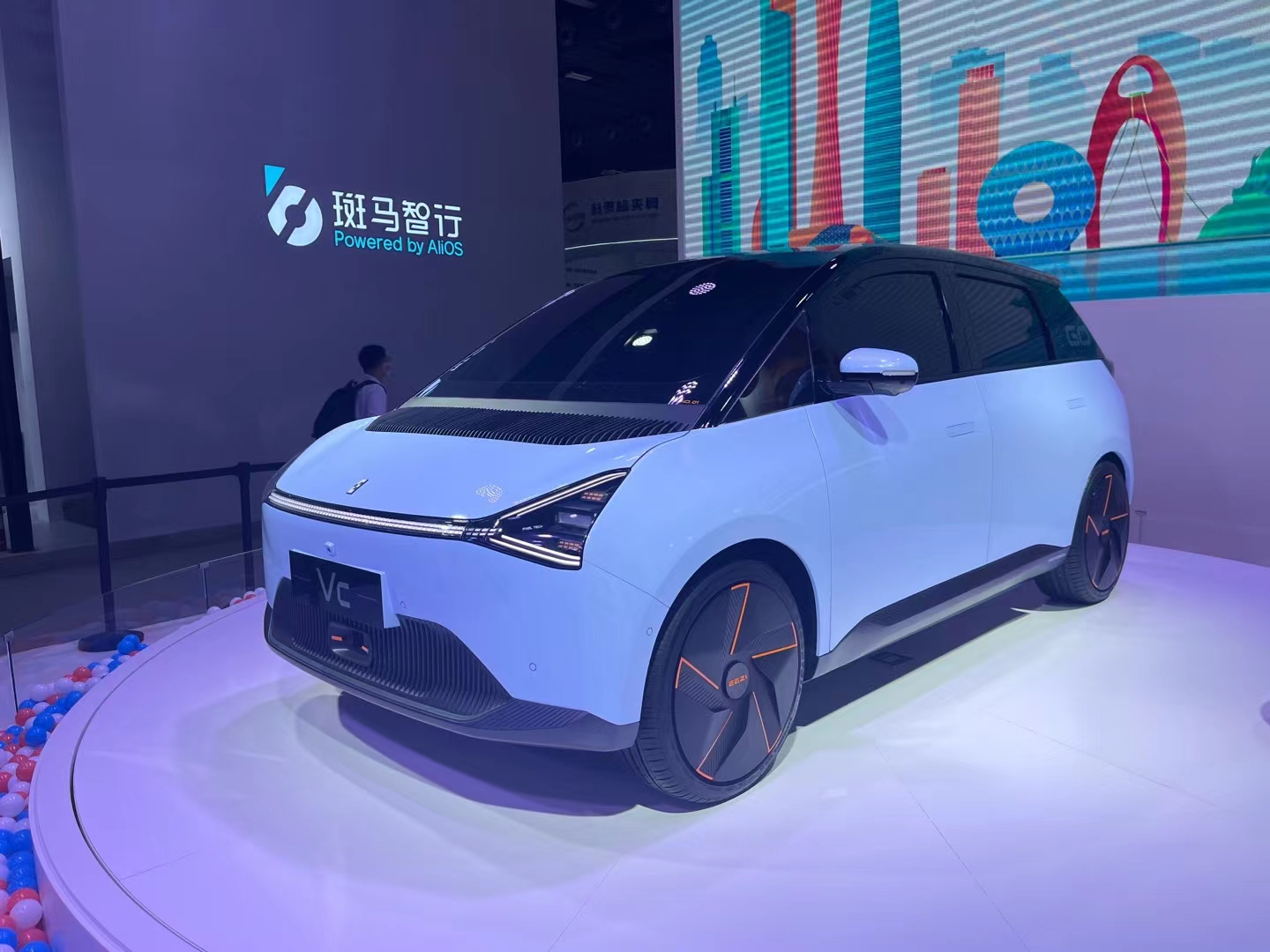
Qingchengshidai VC

The BAIC Ruixiang is another brand launched after the original BAIC Yinxiang went bankrupt in April 2021 when a Chongqing court rules over the bankruptcy and re-organization proceedings. A total of 2 billion yuan was later invested in the company as of 2021, and it was renamed to BAIC Ruixiang Automobile. 300 million yuan comes from BAIC Group through a newly established subsidiary of Chongqing Changhe Automobile, 487 million came from the original Yinxiang Group and 1.2 billion came from an investment fund owned by the Chongqing municipal government. The Ruixiang brand was launched with the introduction of the Ruixiang X5 and X3, with three rebadged vehicles later joined the lineup in 2022 under the Boteng series.

- Ruixiang C5 EV
- Ruixiang X3
- Ruixiang X5 (originally the VGV TX7)
- Ruixiang Boteng V1
- Ruixiang Boteng V2
- Ruixiang Boteng M3
- Ruixiang Hoen O2 (originally the Qingchengshidai VC, 轻橙时代 VC)
