= Huansu H2 =

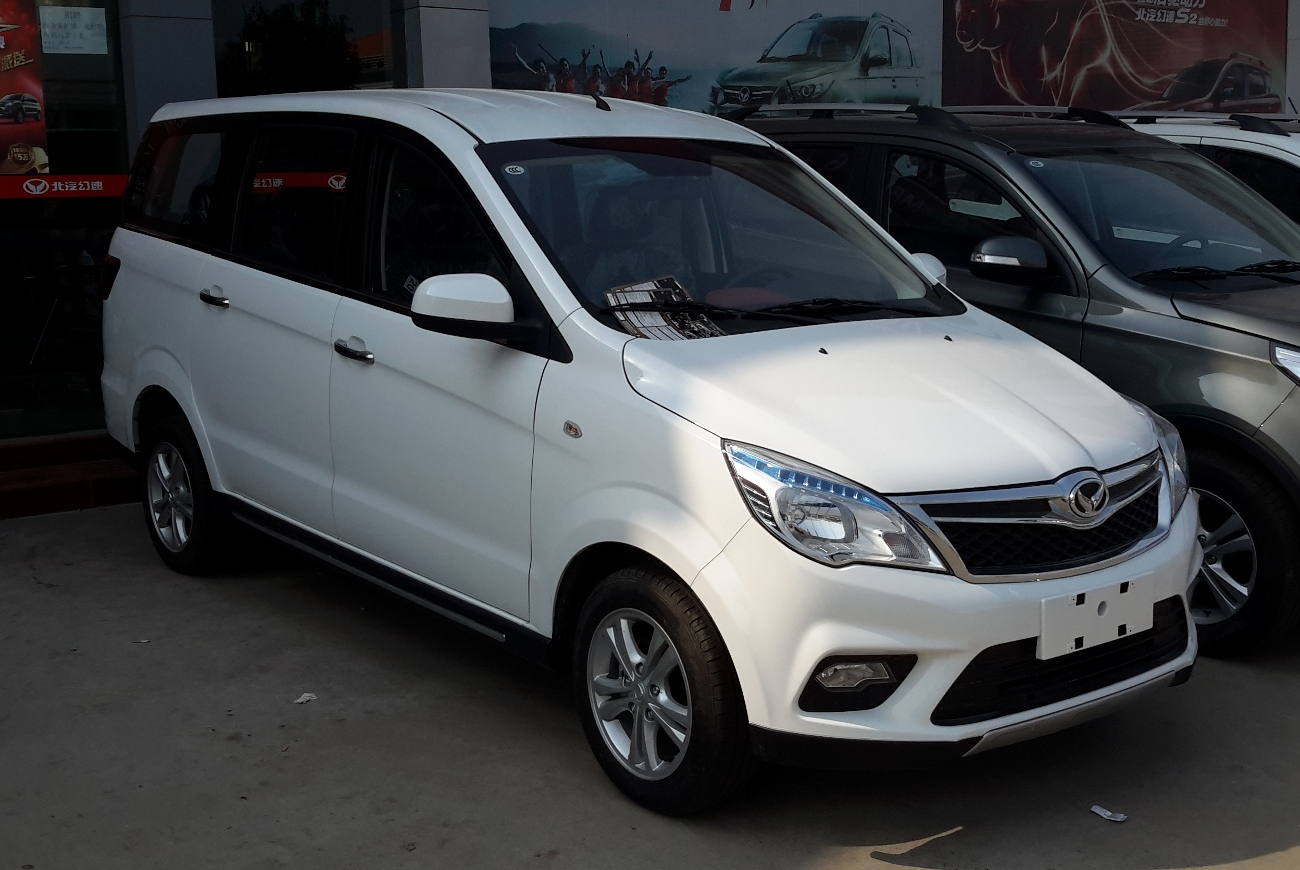

Overview
- Manufacturer: Huansu
- Also called: Ruixiang Boteng V1
- Production: 2015–2018; 2022–Present (Ruixiang Boteng V1)
- Model years: 2015–2018; 2022–Present (Ruixiang Boteng V1)

Body and chassis
- Class: MPV
- Body style: 5-door station wagon
- Layout: FR
- Related: Weiwang M20; Weiwang M30; Weiwang M35; Changhe Freedom M50

Powertrain
- Engine: 1.5L 'I4
- Transmission: 5-speed manual 6-speed automatic

Dimensions
- Wheelbase: 2,810 mm (110.6 in)
- Length: 4,520 mm (178.0 in)
- Width: 1,720 mm (67.7 in)
- Height: 1,825 mm (71.9 in)

The Huansu H2 is a mini MPV produced by Huansu, a brand of the Chongqing Bisu Automotive Corporation, which is closely related to Beiqi-Yinxiang, a joint venture between Beijing Auto (Beiqi) and the Yinxiang Group.

== Overview ==
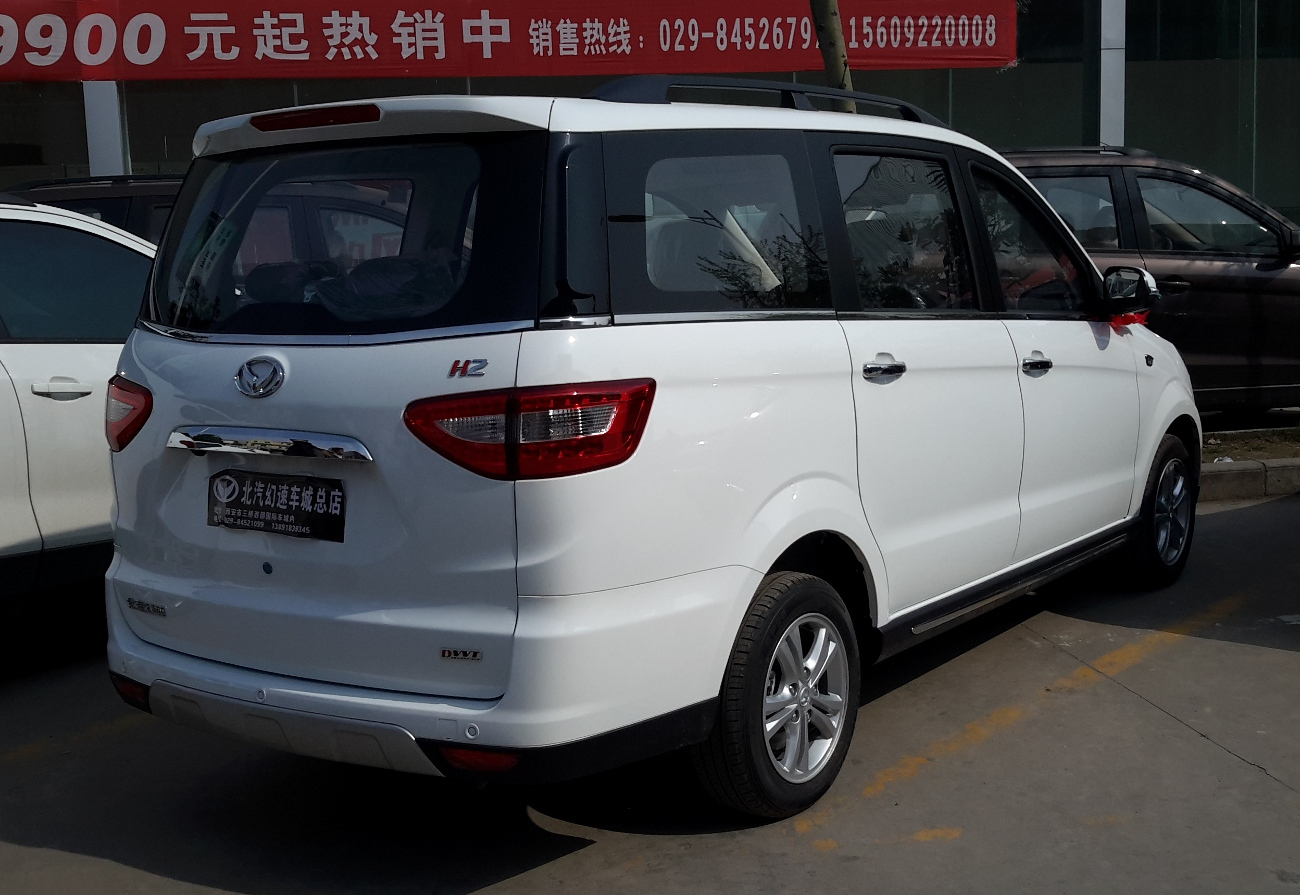
Huansu H2 rear

Based on the same platform as the Weiwang M20, Weiwang M30, Weiwang M35, and Changhe Freedom M50, the Huansu H2 shares most of the body parts from the front fenders to the C-pillars. The price of the Huansu H2 ranges from 39,800 to 66,800 yuan.

The Huansu H2 is powered by engines including a 1.5 liter engine producing 76 kW (102 hp), a 1.5 liter engine producing 79 kW (106 hp), and 1.5 liter engine producing 84 kW (113 hp). The gearbox is either a 5-speed manual transmission or a 7-speed semiautomatic transmission.

Production ceased in 2018 when the Yinxiang Group was in financial problems and failed to restart production in 2019. The Yinxiang Group finally declared bankruptcy in 2021 with products rebranded under the Ruixiang brand.

== Ruixiang Boteng V1 ==
The Ruixiang Boteng V1 is a rebadged version of the Huansu H2. It has been sold since 2022, after the bankruptcy of the Yinxiang Group and the end of the Huansu brand. It features a restyled front end and is powered by a 1.5-litre engine producing a maximum power output of 84 kW (113 hp) and 150 N⋅m (111 lb⋅ft) shared with the Ruixiang Boteng V2 mated to a 5-speed manual transmission.
