= Huansu H6 =

Chinese multi purpose vehicle

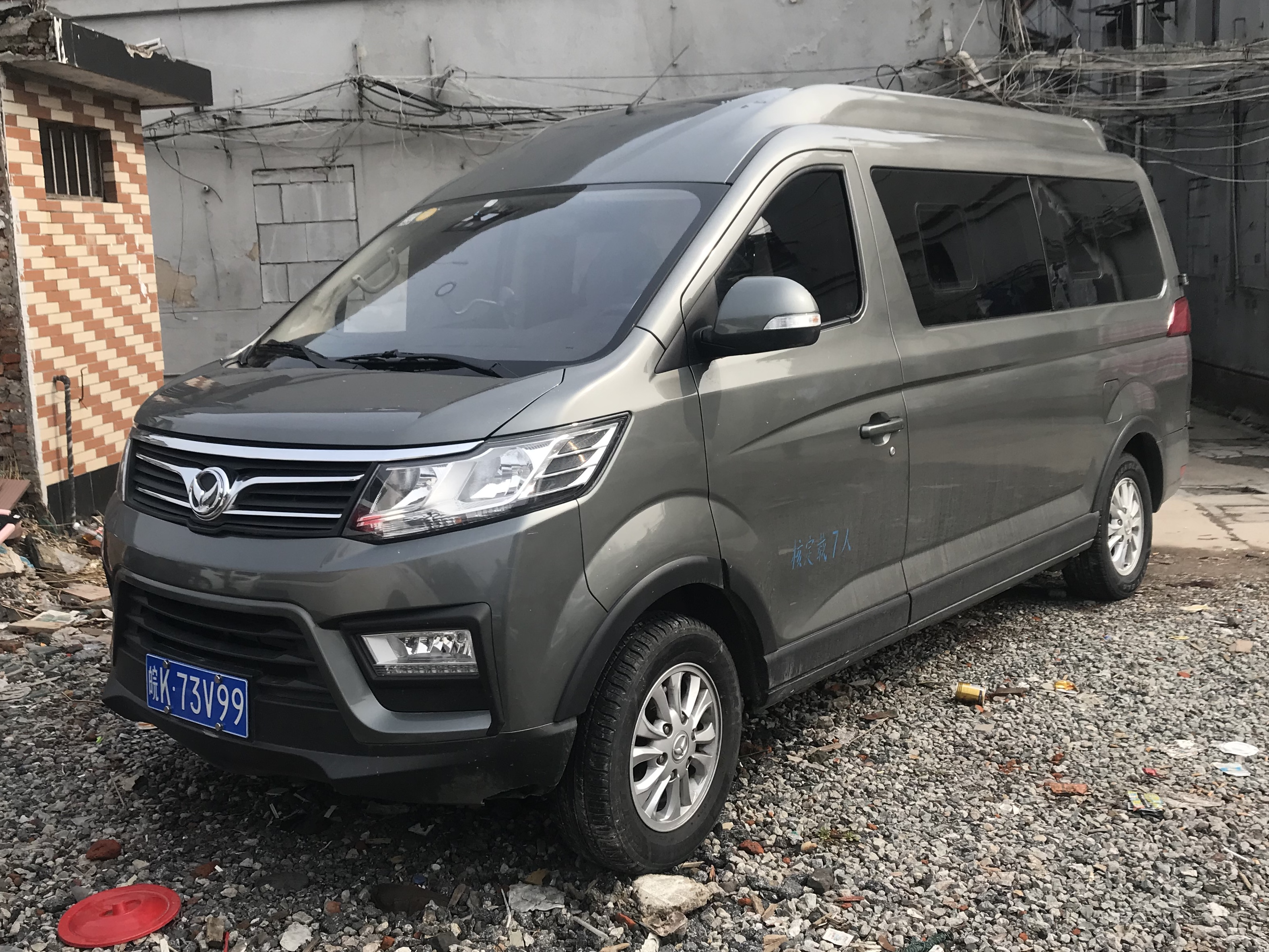

Overview
- Manufacturer: Huansu
- Also called: Weiwang 308 EV (electric); Ruixiang Boteng V2
- Production: 2016–2018; 2022–Present (Ruixiang Boteng V2)
- Model years: 2017–2018; 2022–Present (Ruixiang Boteng V2)

Body and chassis
- Class: MPV
- Body style: 5-door station wagon
- Layout: MR layout

Powertrain
- Engine: 1.5L 'I4; 1.8L 'I4
- Transmission: 5-speed manual

Dimensions
- Wheelbase: 2,115 mm (83.3 in)
- Length: 4,925 mm (193.9 in)
- Width: 1,834 mm (72.2 in)
- Height: 1,980 mm (78.0 in)
- Curb weight: 1,525–1,665 kg (3,362–3,671 lb)

The Huansu H6 is a MPV produced by Huansu, a brand of the Chongqing Bisu Automotive Corporation, which is closely related to Beiqi-Yinxiang, a joint venture between Beijing Auto (Beiqi) and the Yinxiang Group.

== Overview ==
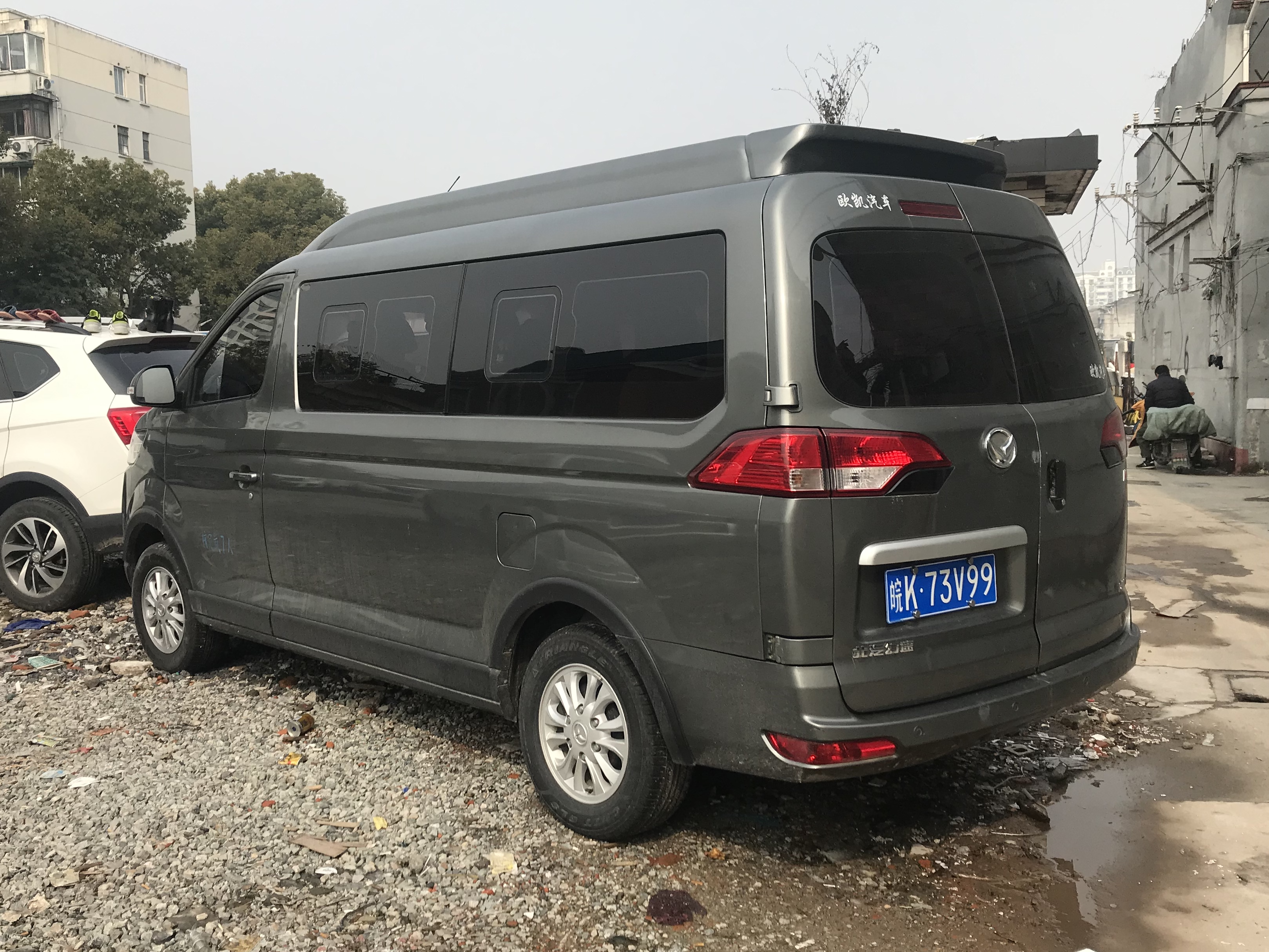
Huansu H6 rear

The Huansu H6 was officially launched during the 2016 Guangzhou Auto Show in China, with prices ranging from 59,800 yuan to 75,300 yuan at launch. The Huansu H6 is a front-mid engine rear wheel drive van with engine options including a 1.5 liter inline-4 petrol engine and a 1.8 liter inline-4 petrol engine, while trim levels include logistics versions in 2-seat and 5-seat configurations, and light passenger versions in 6-seat, 7-seat, and 9-seat configurations.

First versions available to the market was priced between 60,800 yuan and 75,800 yuan and was available from December 2016.

Production ceased in 2018 when the Yinxiang Group was in financial problems and failed to restart production in 2019. The Yinxiang Group finally declared bankruptcy in 2021 with products rebranded under the Ruixiang brand.

== Ruixiang Boteng V2 ==
The Ruixiang Boteng V2 is a rebadged Huansu H6 featuring a restyled front end sold under the Ruixiang brand from 2022. The Ruixiang Boteng V2 is powered by a 1.5-litre engine producing a maximum power output of 84 kW (113 hp) and 150 N⋅m (111 lb⋅ft) shared with the Ruixiang Boteng V1 mated to a 5-speed manual transmission.
