= Weiwang 205 =

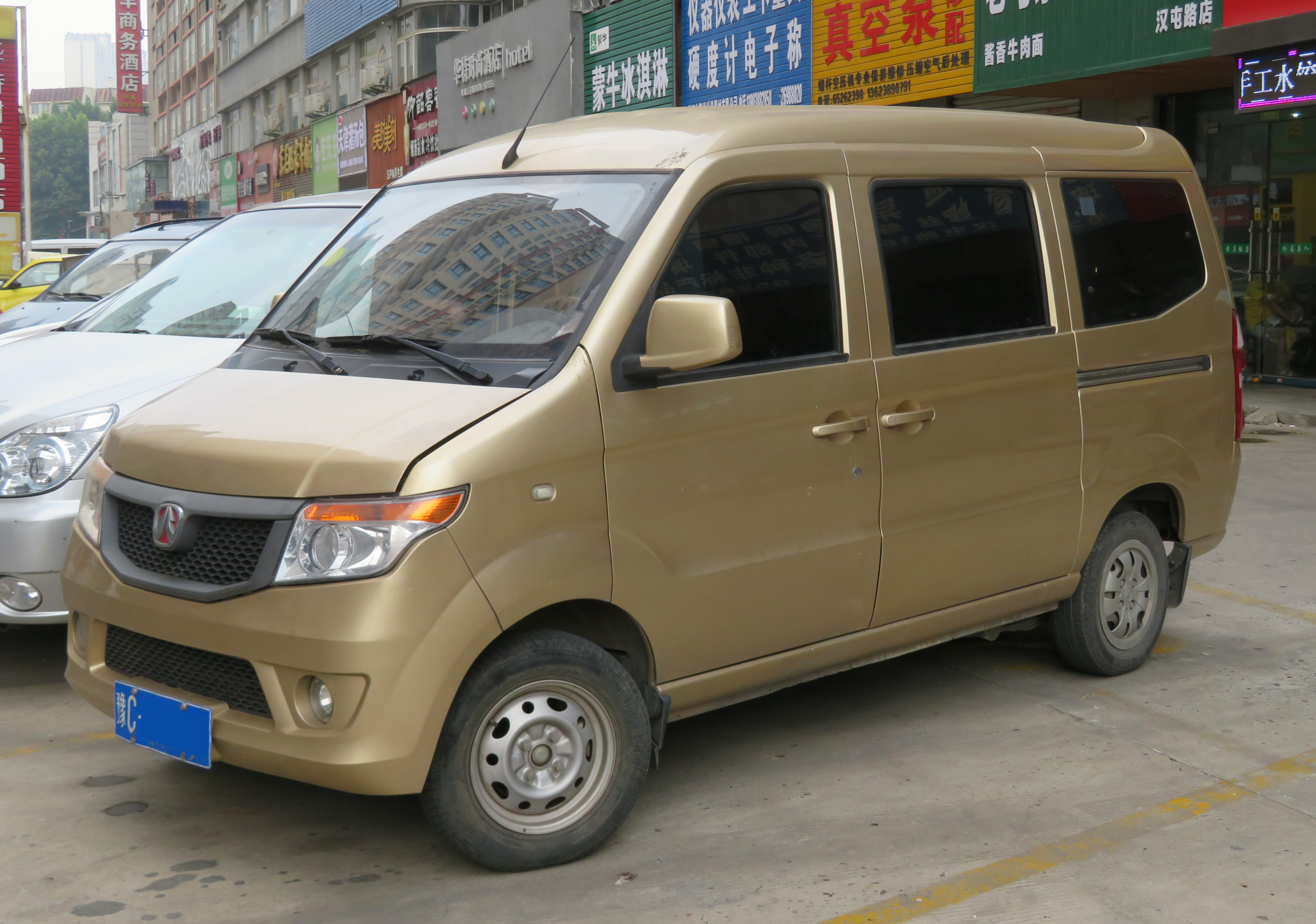

Overview
- Manufacturer: BAIC Group
- Production: 2012–2017

Body and chassis
- Class: Microvan
- Body style: 5-door van
- Layout: Mid-engine Rear wheel drive

Powertrain
- Engine: 1.3L I4
- Transmission: 5 speed manual

Dimensions
- Wheelbase: 2,500 mm (98.4 in)
- Length: 3,895 mm (153.3 in); 4,022 mm (158.3 in) (extended version)
- Width: 1,600 mm (63.0 in)
- Height: 1,878 mm (73.9 in)

The Weiwang 205 is a microvan produced by Weiwang, a sub-brand of BAIC. Beijing Automotive Industry Corporation, BAIC, launched the Weiwang brand in March 2011 and will focus on minicars and minivans.

== Overview ==
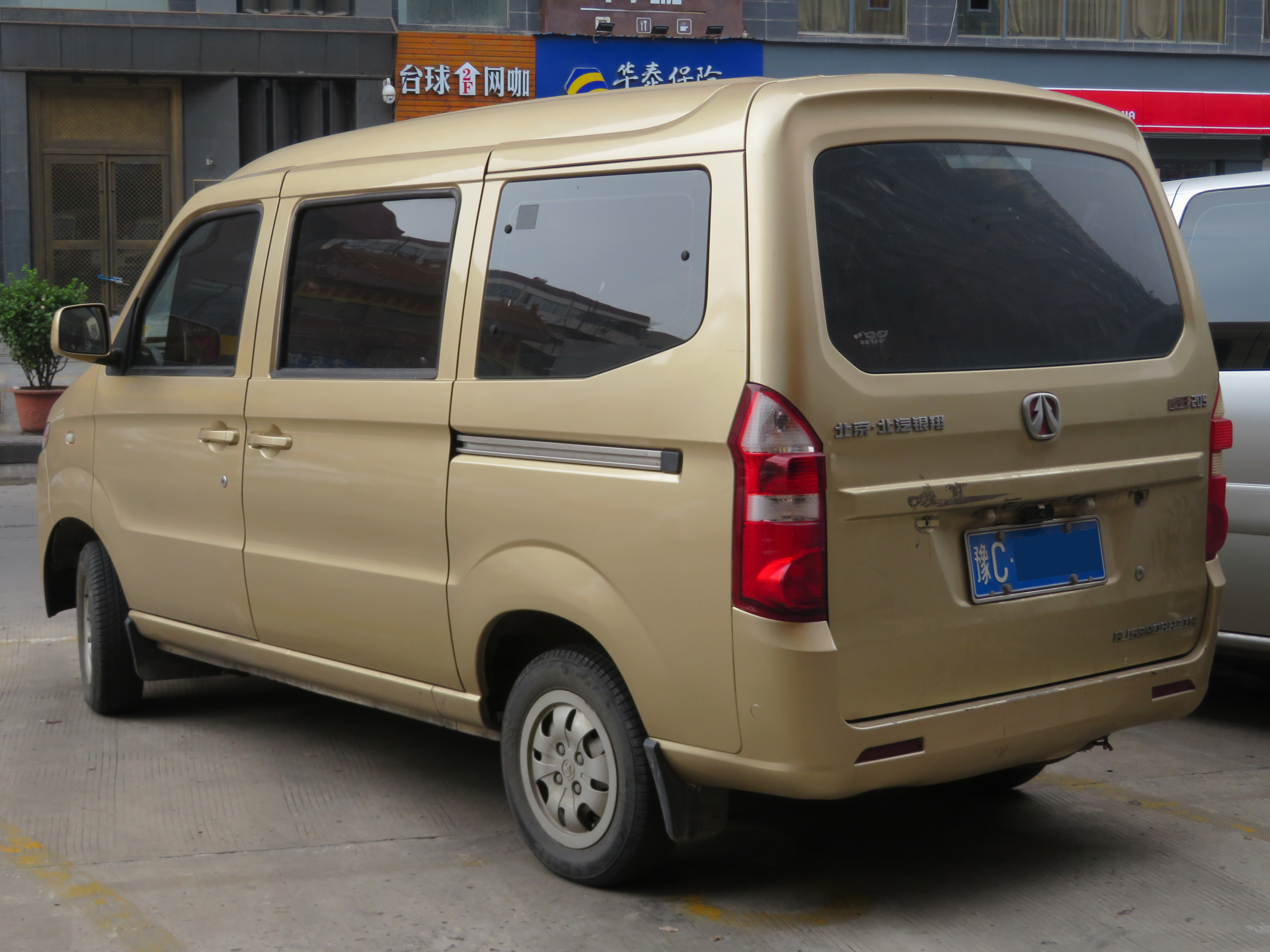
BAIC Weiwang (威旺) 205 rear quarter

The Weiwang 205 is based on the same platform as the first product at the brand launch, the 306, and it is a typical Chinese minivan or mianbaoche. Launched in November 2012, the available engines include a 1.0L inline-four producing 45 kW (61 hp) and 87 N⋅m (64 lb⋅ft) of torque and a 1.3L inline-four producing 60 kW (81 hp) and 102 N⋅m (75 lb⋅ft) of torque with both engines mated to a 5-speed manual gearbox. The price range starts from 29,800 yuan to 40,800 yuan.
