= Weiwang 306 =

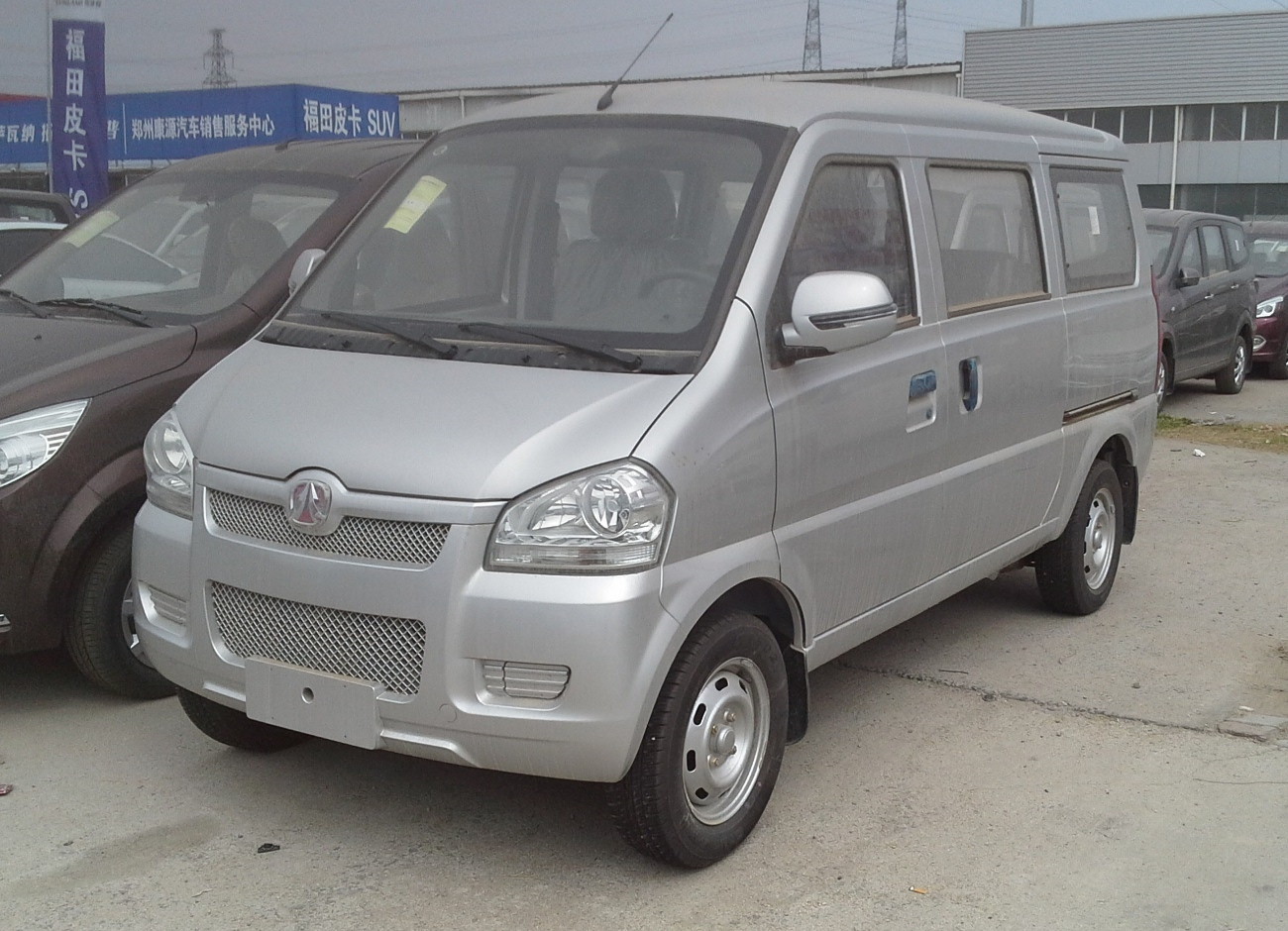

Overview
- Manufacturer: BAIC Group
- Also called: Weiwang 307
- Production: 2011–2016

Body and chassis
- Class: Microvan
- Body style: 5-door van
- Layout: Mid-engine Rear wheel drive

Powertrain
- Engine: 1.3L I4
- Transmission: 5 speed manual

Dimensions
- Wheelbase: 2,700 mm (106.3 in)
- Length: 4,030 mm (158.7 in)
- Width: 1,636 mm (64.4 in)
- Height: 1,907 mm (75.1 in)
- Curb weight: 1,150 kg (2,540 lb)–1,185 kg (2,612 lb)

The Weiwang 306 is a microvan produced by Weiwang, a sub-brand of BAIC. Beijing Automotive Industry Corporation, BAIC, launched the Weiwang brand in March 2011 and will focus on minicars and minivans.

== Overview ==
The Weiwang 306 is the first product at the brand launch, and it is a typical Chinese minivan or mianbaoche. The only available engine is a 1.3L inline-four producing 60 kW (81 hp) and 102 N⋅m (75 lb⋅ft) of torque. The max cargo space is 5.01 cubic meter and the price range starts from 32,300 yuan to 40,100 yuan.

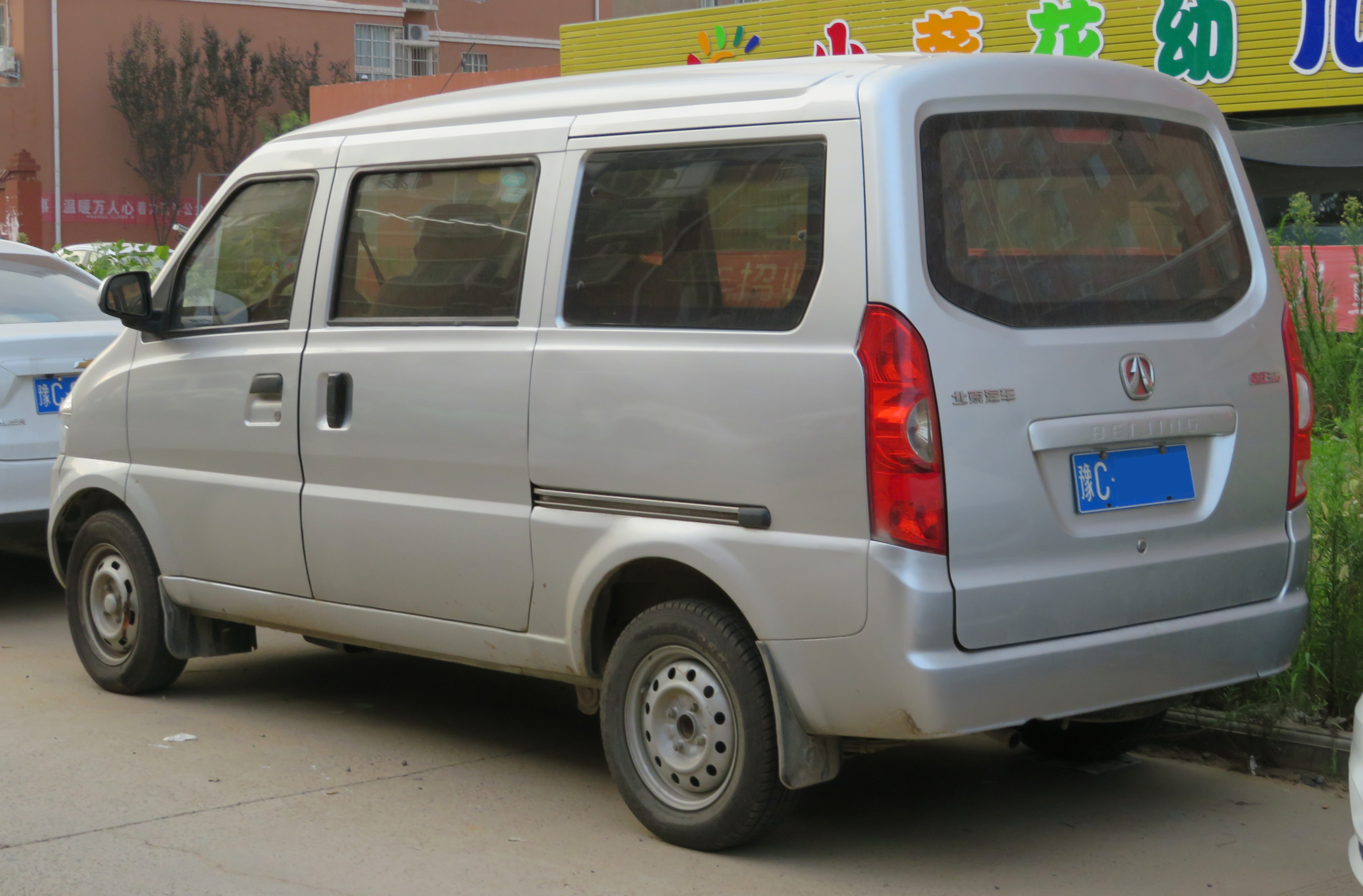
Weiwang 306 rear

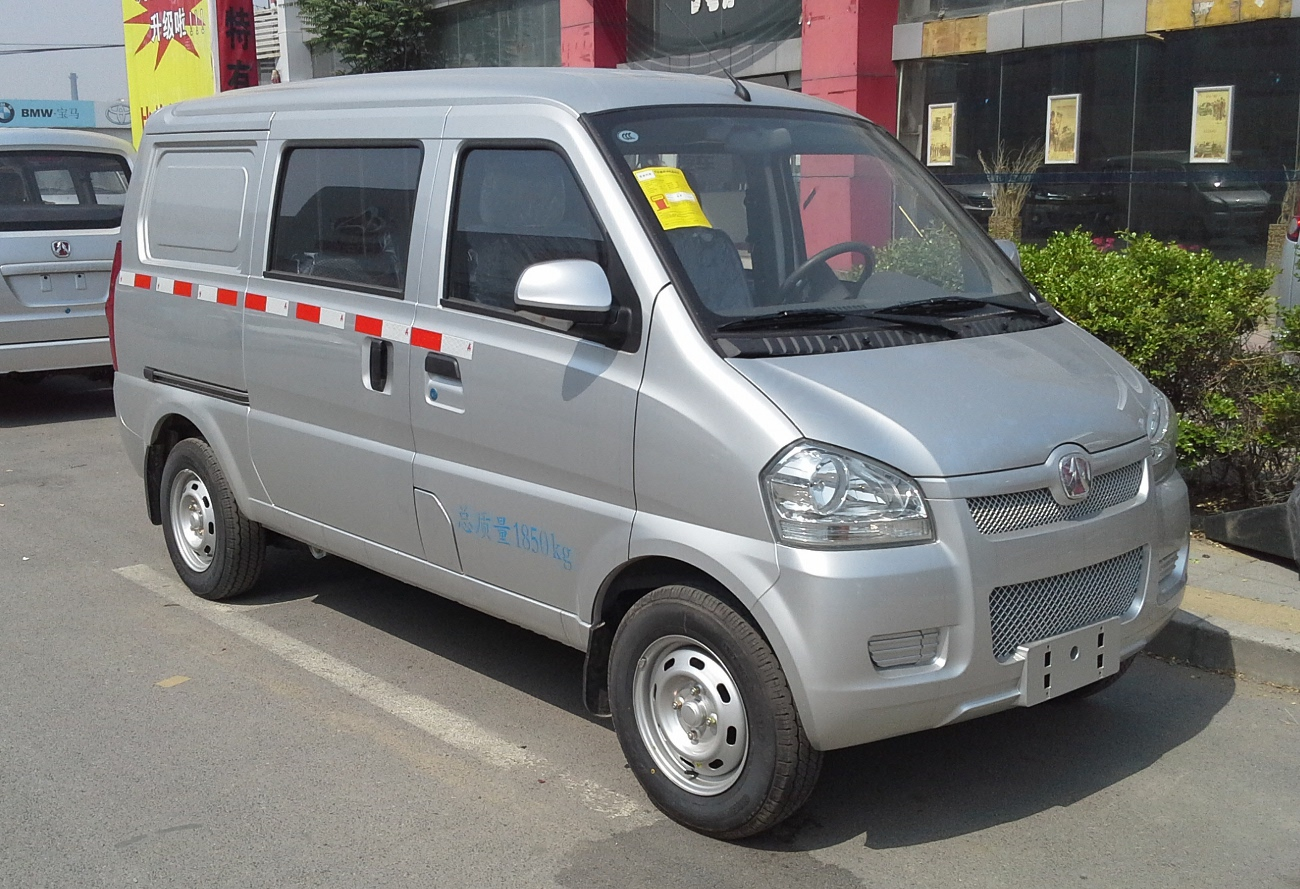
Weiwang 306 cargo van

== Weiwang 307 ==
The Weiwang 307 is an extended version of the regular Weiwang 306.

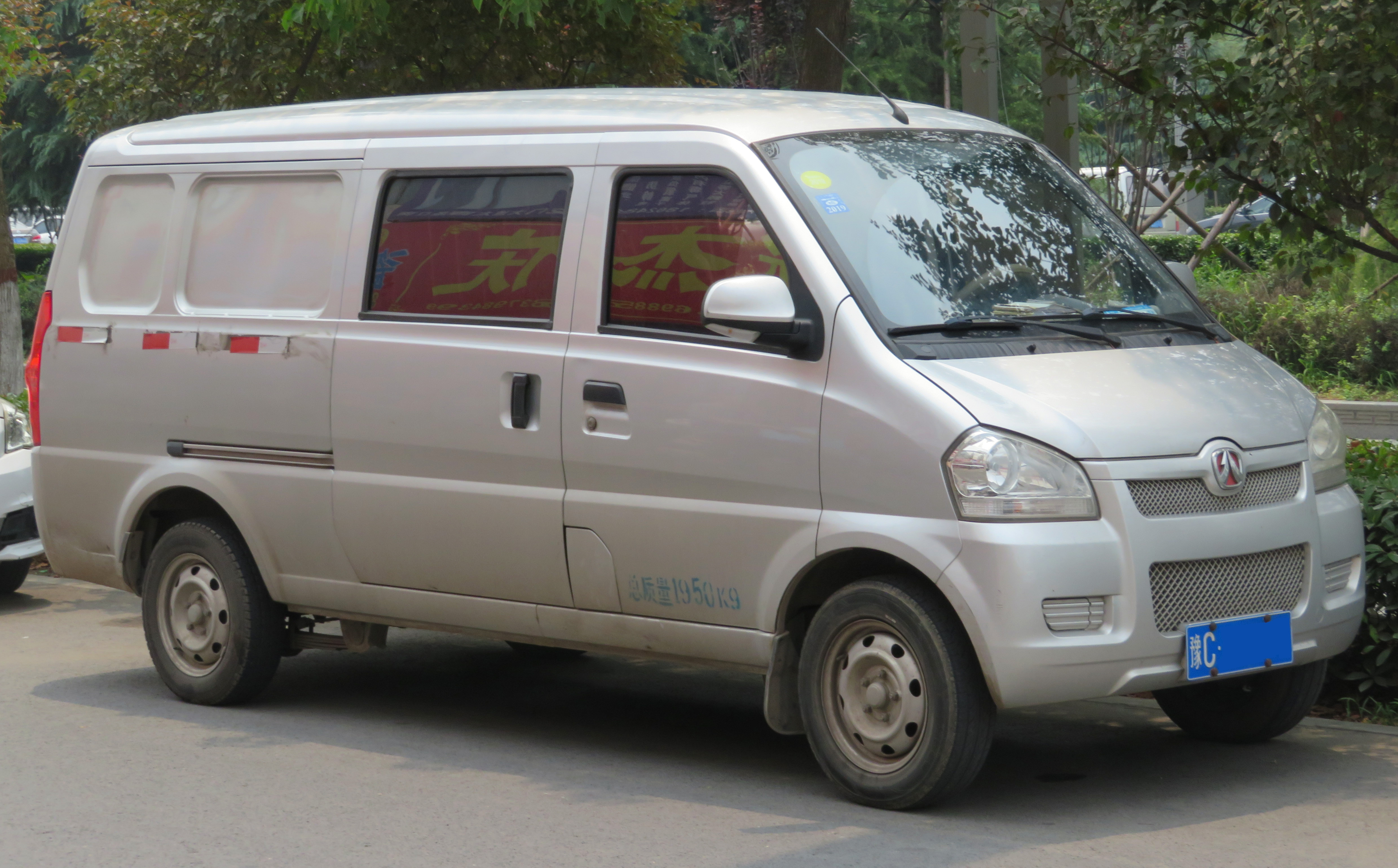
Weiwang 307 panel

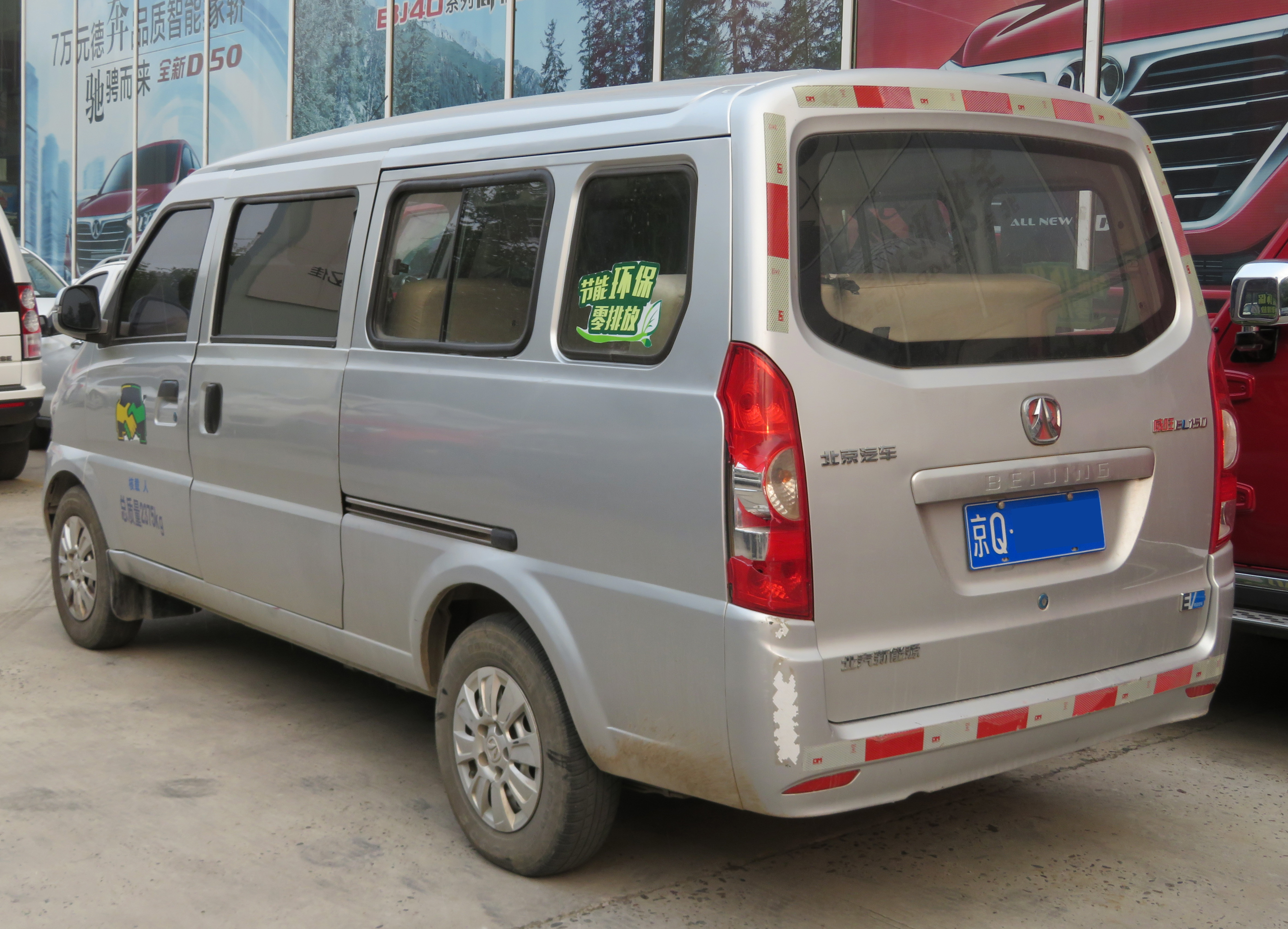
Weiwang 307 standard (commercial, rear)
