= 3H (disambiguation) =

3H (hydrogen-3, ^{3}H, or tritium) is a radioactive isotope of hydrogen.

3H may also refer to:

- 3H Movement, a liberal Turkish youth organization
- 3H Biomedical, a Swedish biotechnology company
- Mu-3H, a model of Mu (rocket family)
- Yuri 3H, a Broadcasting Satellite (Japanese)
- SSH 3H (WA), alternate designation for Washington State Route 27
- Old Natchez Trace (230-3H); see Old Natchez Trace segments listed on the National Register of Historic Places

== See also ==
- H3 (disambiguation)
- HHH (disambiguation)
- Triple H (disambiguation)
