= HH3 =

HH3 or HH-3 may refer to:

- Sikorsky HH-3, a variant of the Sikorsky SH-3 Sea King helicopter
- HH3, a model in the series of Honda Acty trucks
- Prokineticin receptor 2 (HH3)
- The Short Victorious War, the third novel in the Honor Harrington series by David Weber, abbreviated HH3

== See also ==
- H3 (disambiguation)
