= H3 =

H3, H03 or H-3 may refer to:

== Entertainment ==
- H3 (film), a 2001 film about the 1981 Irish hunger strike
- H3 – Halloween Horror Hostel, a 2008 German horror-parody television film
- Happy Hustle High, a manga series by Rie Takada, originally titled "H3 School!"
- h3h3Productions, styled "[h3]", a satirical YouTube channel

== Science ==
- Triatomic hydrogen (H_{3}), an unstable molecule
- Trihydrogen cation (H^{+}_{3}), one of the most abundant ions in the universe
- Tritium (^{3}H), or hydrogen-3, an isotope of hydrogen
- ATC code H03 Thyroid therapy, a subgroup of the Anatomical Therapeutic Chemical Classification System
- British NVC community H3, a heath community of the British National Vegetation Classification system
- Histamine H_{3} receptor, a human gene
- Histone H3, a component of DNA higher structure in eukaryotic cells
- Hekla 3 eruption, a huge volcanic eruption around 1000 BC

== Computing ==
- HTTP/3, the third major version of the Hypertext Transfer Protocol
- Socket H3, a CPU socket
- <h3></h3>, the level-3 HTML heading markup element
- H3, a geospatial indexing system based on a discrete global grid, developed by Uber
- MiniMax H3, video generation AI from MiniMax Group

== Transportation ==
=== Air and space ===
- H3 (rocket), a Japanese expendable launch system
- H-3 Air Base, a former Iraqi Air Force base in western Iraq
- Dynali H3 EasyFlyer, a Belgian helicopter
- Howland H-3 Pegasus, an American ultralight aircraft
- Sikorsky SH-3 Sea King, an American twin-engined anti-submarine warfare helicopter
- Standard H-3, an early American reconnaissance aircraft
- VFW-Fokker H3 Sprinter, a West German experimental rotorcraft

=== Automobiles ===
- Brilliance H3, a Chinese compact sedan
- Great Wall Haval H3, a Chinese compact SUV
- Huansu H3, a Chinese compact MPV
- Hummer H3, an American mid-size SUV
- IFA Horch H3, an East German lorry
- Rely H3, a Chinese light commercial van

=== Rail ===
- Alstom Prima H3, a French diesel/battery hybrid locomotive
- GNR Class H3, a class of British steam locomotives
- H3 series of METRORail tramways in Houston

=== Bus routes ===
- London Buses route H3

=== Roads ===
- H3 Monks Way, part of the Milton Keynes grid road system, United Kingdom
- Interstate H-3, a highway in Hawaii

=== Ships ===
- H3 (yacht), a luxury yacht
- HMS Grenville (H03), a destroyer of the British Royal Navy
- HMS H3, a submarine of the British Royal Navy
- USS H-3 (SS-30), a submarine of the United States Navy

== Other uses ==
- H3 (classification), a para-cycling classification
- H3 (Kuwait), an archaeological site
- H3 (pyrotechnics), a pyrotechnic composition
- *h₃, one of the three laryngeals in the reconstructed Proto-Indo-European language
- H3 Entertainment, a subsidiary of the film industry company The H Collective
- H3 Podcast, hosted by Ethan Klein
- Gerovital H3, a pseudoscientific anti-aging treatment
- Hash House Harriers, an international group of non-competitive running, social and drinking clubs
- H3, an 18th-century marine chronometer by John Harrison
- H3, a type of automotive halogen lamp
- H3 Hardy Collaboration Architecture, a firm started by Hugh Hardy
- DSC-H3, a 2008 Sony Cyber-shot camera

== See also ==
- 3H (disambiguation)
- HHH (disambiguation)
- Triple H (disambiguation)
