= Weiwang M50F =

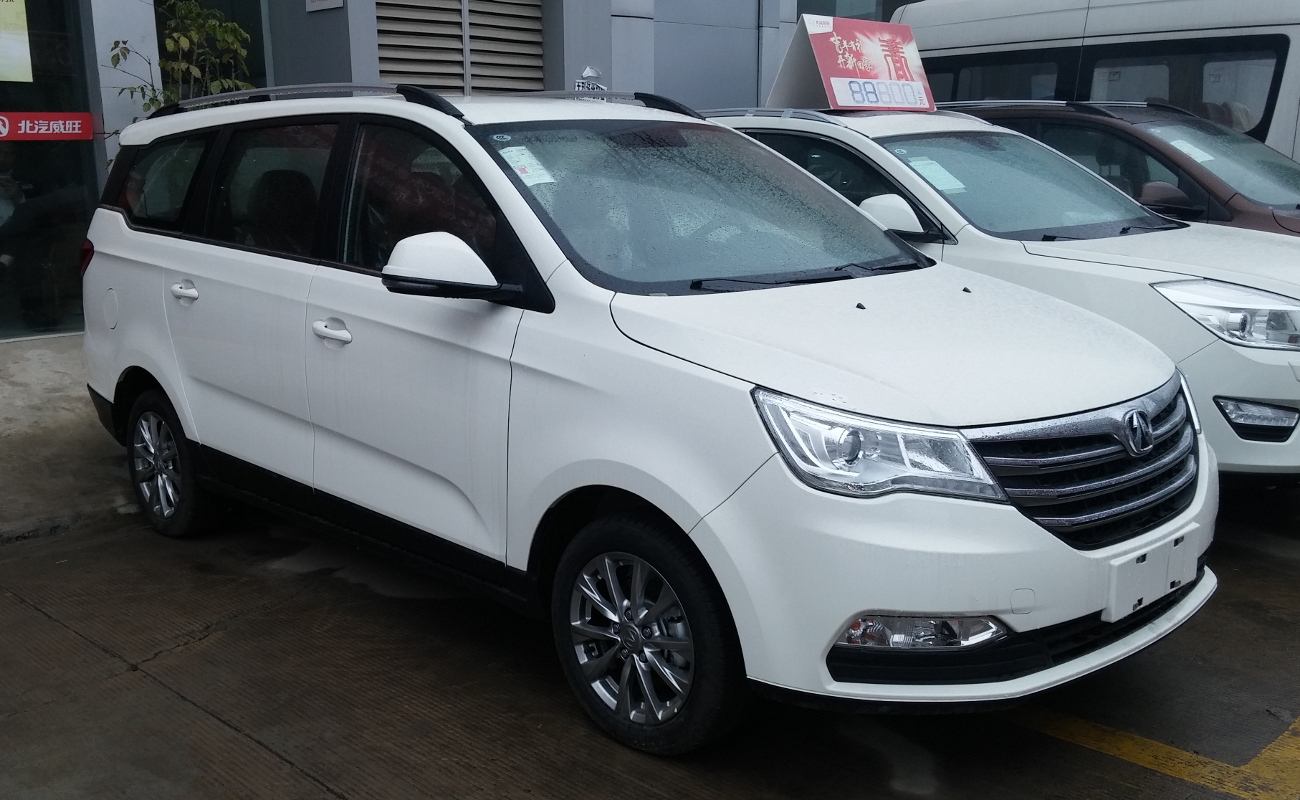

Overview
- Manufacturer: BAIC Group
- Also called: Weiwang M60; Innoson Ikenga/ IVM M20 (Nigeria)
- Production: 2016–2018

Body and chassis
- Class: Minivan (M)
- Body style: 5-door van
- Layout: Front-engine, front-wheel-drive

Powertrain
- Engine: 1.3L turbo I4; 1.5L I4; 1.5L turbo I4
- Transmission: 5 speed manual CVT

Dimensions
- Wheelbase: 2,760 mm (108.7 in) (M50F)
- Length: 4,724 mm (186.0 in) (M50F); 4,800 mm (189.0 in) (M60)
- Width: 1,796 mm (70.7 in) (M50F); 1,824 mm (71.8 in) (M60)
- Height: 1,718 mm (67.6 in)–1,755 mm (69.1 in) (M50F); 1,718 mm (67.6 in)–1,725 mm (67.9 in) (M60)
- Curb weight: 1,445 kg (3,186 lb)–1,465 kg (3,230 lb) (M50F); 1,445 kg (3,186 lb) (M60)

The Weiwang M50F is a minivan produced by Weiwang, a sub-brand of BAIC. A more premium variant called the Weiwang M60 is also available with more radical styling and upgraded powertrain.

== Overview ==
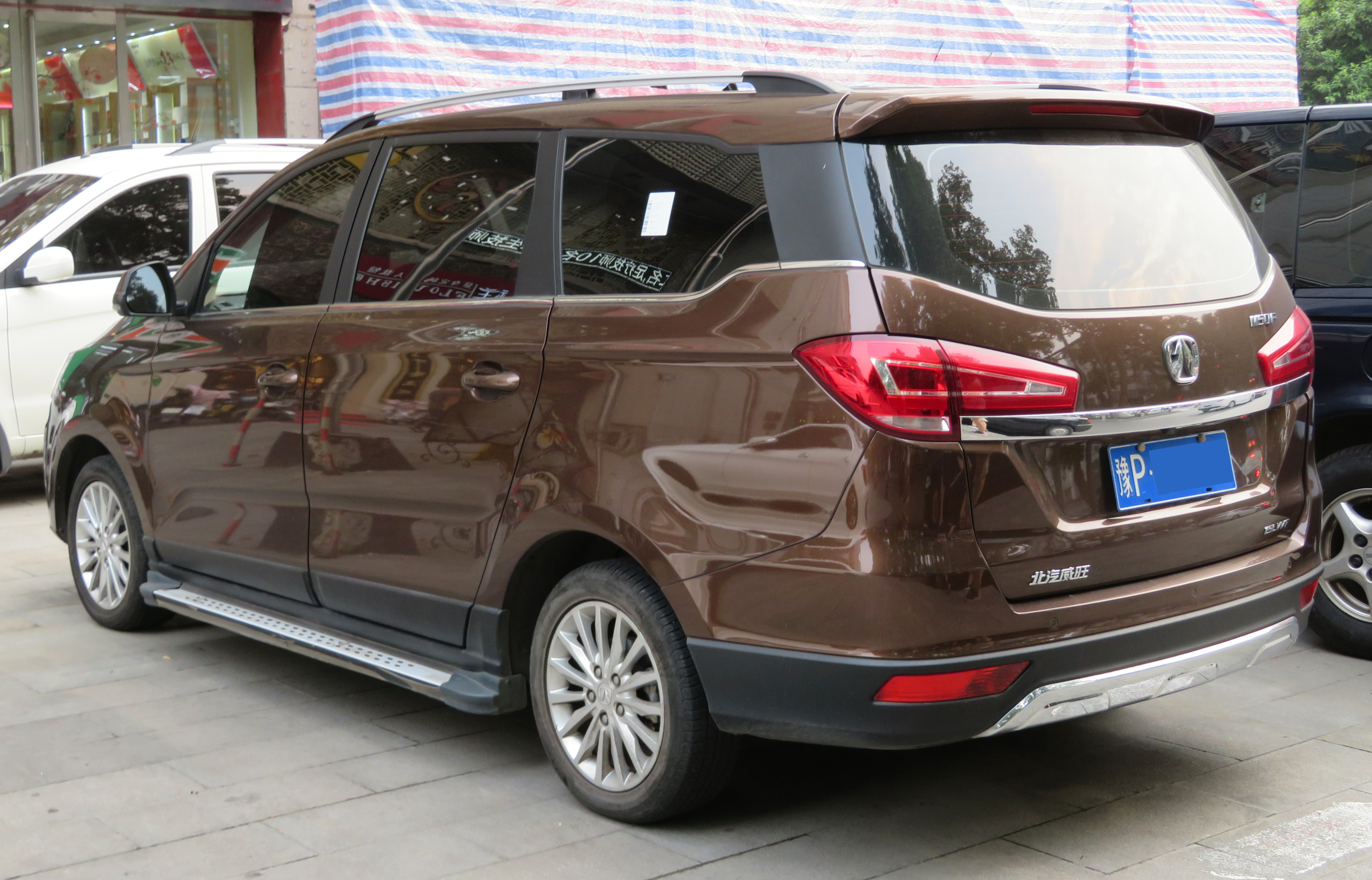
Weiwang M50F rear

The Beijing Auto Weiwang M50F was launched in November 2016 with a 7-seat 2/2/3 configuration. There are two powertrain options with the 1.3 liter turbo engine mated to a six-speed manual transmission, and the 1.5 liter engine mated to a five-speed manual transmission.

=== Platform sharing ===
Weiwang is a brand under the Beiqi Yinxiang Automobile, a joint venture between Beijing Auto (Beiqi) and the Yinxiang Motorcycle Group from Chongqing. This joint venture also sells the Huansu brand and the Weiwang M50F is based on the same platform as the Huansu H3.

== Weiwang M60 ==
The Weiwang M60 is the more premium and crossover version of the regular Weiwang M50F featuring plastic claddings around the wheel arches, a redesigned front bumper with grilles inspired by the Lexus spindle grilles and a slightly redesigned rear bumper. The Weiwang M60 was also sold as the Changhe Freedom M60 under the Changhe brand of BAIC. In terms of powertrain, the Weiwang M60 is available with a 1.5 liter engine developing 87 kW (116 hp) and a 1.5 liter turbo engine developing 110 kW (150 hp).

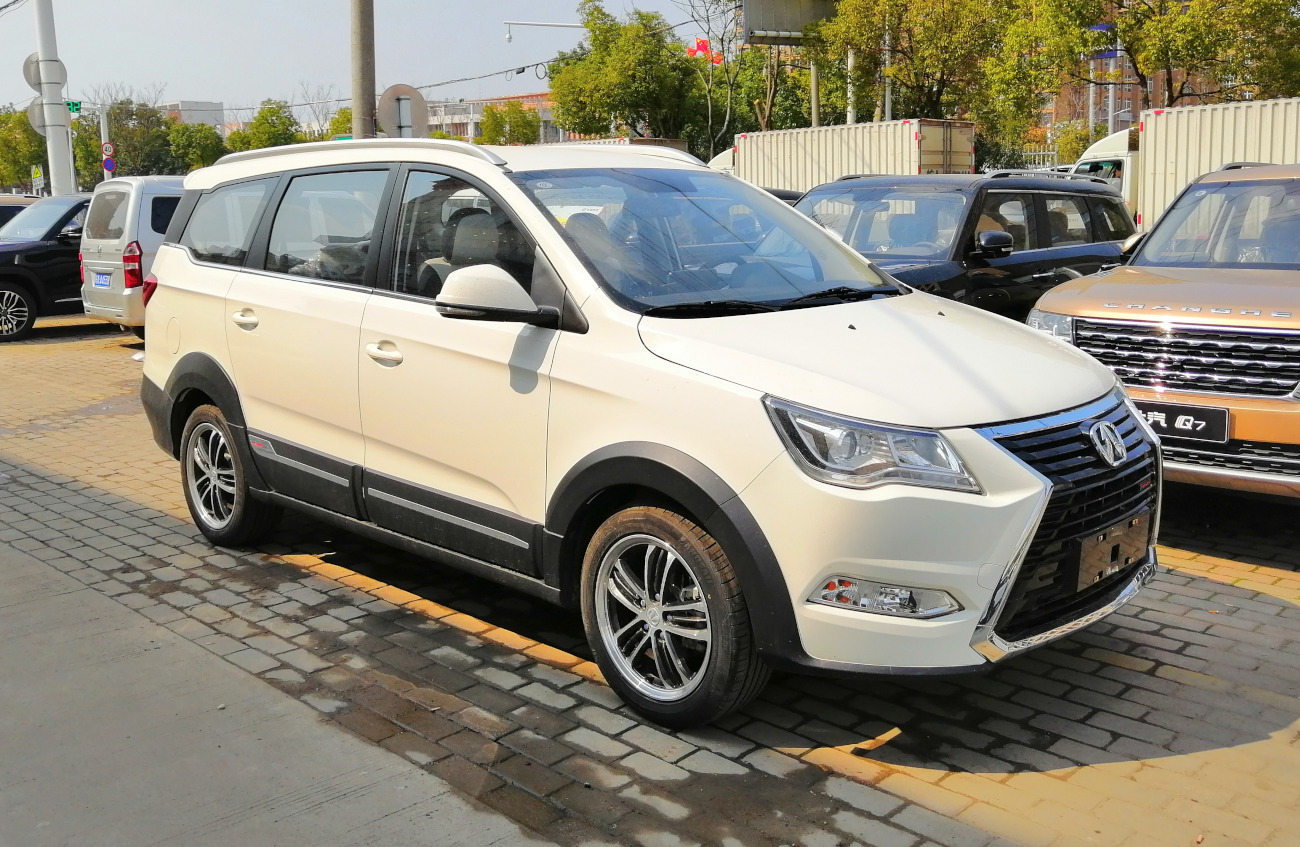
Weiwang M60

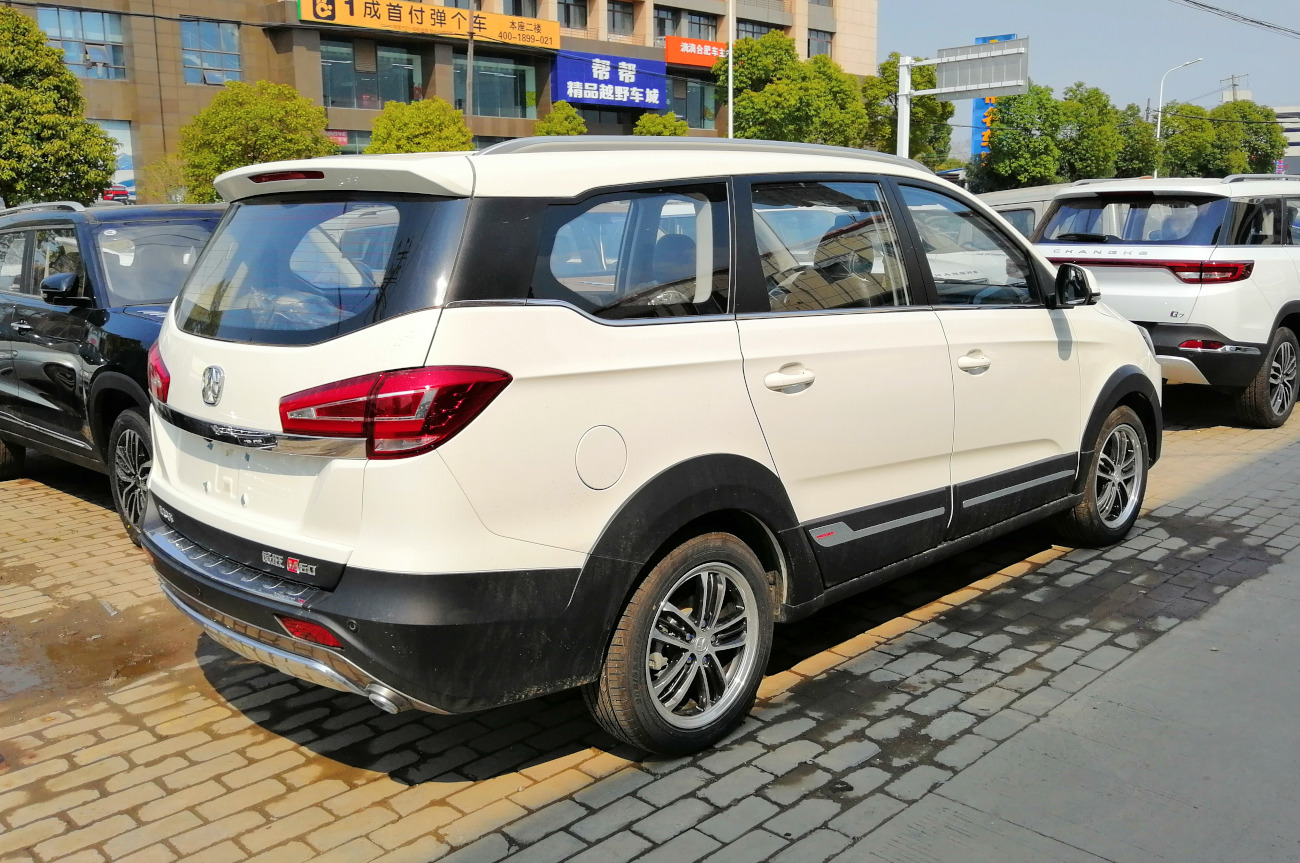
Weiwang M60 rear

=== Overseas market version ===
The Weiwang M60 is also rebadged as the Innoson Ikenga or IVM M20 and sold by Innoson Vehicle Manufacturing in Nigeria.
