= Burst charge =

Pyrotechnic mixture

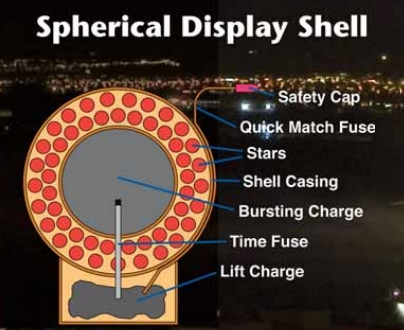
Fireworks shell

In fireworks, a burst charge (usually black powder) is a pyrotechnic mixture placed in a shell which is ignited when the shell reaches the desired height in order to create an explosion and spread the stars. Burst charge compositions are usually coated onto rice hulls or other low-density fillers, which increases the rate of combustion.

In artillery and Naval artillery the burst charge or bursting charge is ignited by a primer at the base of the shell.

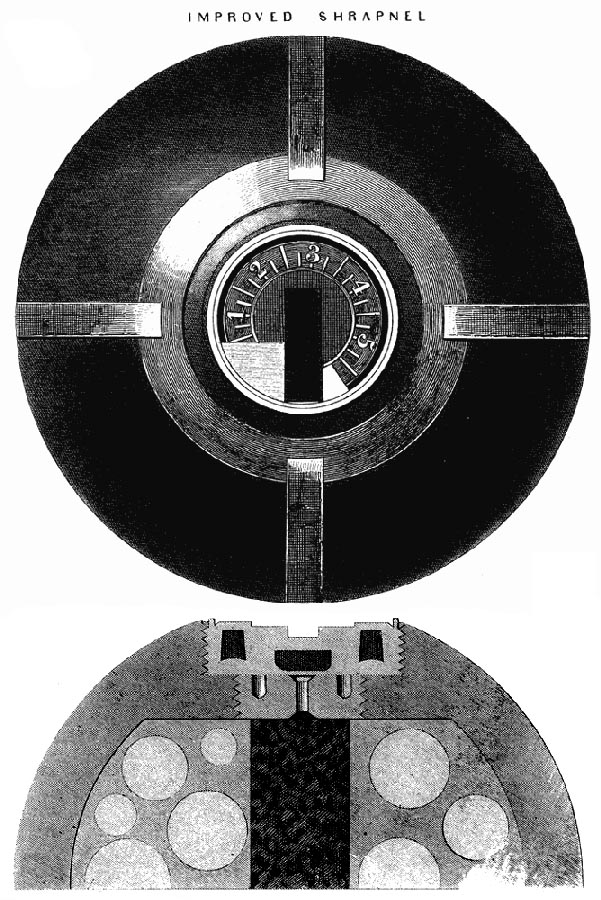
This engraving shows a 12-pounder U.S. shrapnel shell c. 1865. It is fitted with a Borman fuze. In the cutaway view, the dark grey is the wall of the shell, the medium grey is sulphur resin, the light grey are the musket balls, and the black is the bursting charge.

== Common burst charges ==
- Black powder
- Flash powder
- H3
- Whistle mix
