= Triple H (disambiguation) =

Triple H (born 1969) is the ring name of Paul Michael Levesque, also known as Hunter Hearst Helmsley, an American business executive, professional wrestler, actor, and former bodybuilder.

Triple H may also refer to:

== People, persons, characters ==
- Hans-Hermann Hoppe (born 1949, nicknamed Triple H), German-American professor and political activist
- Hubert Horatio Humphrey Jr., 38th Vice President of the United States
- Triple H, a fictional idol trio in the anime series Penguindrum

== Groups, companies, organizations ==
- Triple H (band), a South Korean K-pop trio
- Triple H (Sydney), a community radio station based in Hornsby, New South Wales
- Triple H (Horsham), a community radio station based in Horsham, Victoria
- Triple H Team Hegersport, a German auto racing team

== Other uses ==
- Triple H, a protocol for treating subarachnoid hemorrhage by inducing hypertension, hypervolemia, and hemodilution
- Triple H syndrome, a urea-cycle disorder

== See also ==
- HHH (disambiguation)
- 3H (disambiguation)
- H3 (disambiguation)
