= Innocent Chukwuma =

Nigerian business magnate and investor

Innocent Ifediaso Chukwuma
- Born: 1961 (age 64–65); Nnewi
- Occupation: Business magnate
- Known for: Founder of Innoson Vehicle Manufacturing (IVM)
- Honours: Officer of the Order of the Federal Republic (OFR)

Innocent Ifediaso Chukwuma (listernCON ; born 1 October 1961) is a Nigerian business magnate and investor. He is the founder and CEO of Innoson Vehicle Manufacturing, (IVM) Nigeria's first indigenous automobile manufacturing company.

== Early life ==
Innocent Chukwuma was born into the family of Chukwuma Mojekwu. He is the youngest child in a family of six (4 males and 2 females). His dad is Chukwuma Mojekwu; he was a government worker, while his mother, Martina Chukwuma, was a homemaker. He was born on 1 October 1961 in Uru-Udim Nnewi, Anambra State.

== Education ==
In 1978, after he was done with secondary education, he applied to study engineering at university, but while waiting, he realized he did not meet the cutoff mark. He later went to help his elder brother Gabriel out in his medicine store.

== Career ==
With his brother, he realized he had a natural talent for trading. In 1979 he became an apprentice for Chief Romanus Eze Onwuka, who was the biggest motorcycle part seller in the Nenwi market at the time.

In 1980 he left his boss and returned to his brother and registered a business called Gabros International, which was funded by his brother Gabriel with the sum of 3,000 Naira.

In 1981, after his education, Innocent began trading in spare parts, a very lucrative business in South East Nigeria. He then founded the company Innoson Group with Innoson Manufacturing, Innoson Tech. & Industries Co. Ltd as its subsidiaries in 1982.

He began to import motorcycles and disassemble them, then on arrival assemble them again, making him slash the price of the motorcycle by 40% of the actual selling price then. As he imported the motorcycles he noticed they had a lot of plastics which prompted him to start up a plastic factory which is now one of the biggest in Nigeria.

In 2007, Innoson Vehicle Manufacturing (IVM) was established. The headquarter is in Nnewi Anambra Nigeria.(IVM) is also known as the Pride of African Roads.

(IVM) has started producing vehicles for the Army, Police as well as spare parts for Jets and others. On October 10, 2015, President Goodluck Johnathan assured him of patronage from the Government.

In 2013, he was appointed deputy chairman, Board of Trustees National Coalition for Jonathan/Sambo Presidency, a group setup to promote the election of the former Nigerian president, Goodluck Jonathan. Some states' Governments like Enugu, Imo, Ekiti, Gombe, Anambra have kept on with their patronage. IVM was awarded the 2023 Auto Plant in Nigeria. He got an Award for the role he played in the manufacture of Compressed Natural Gas (CNG) powered vehicles in Nigeria. Innocent embarked on a multi-billion naira IVM plant annex commissioned in the first quarter of 2024.

== Personal life ==
He experienced huge patronage from the Buhari Administration. His vehicle factory can manufacture all brands of vehicles. He got the auto personality award instituted by the Nigeria Auto Journalist Association (NAJA). He is married to Ebele Chukwuma and they are blessed with children. He has won numerous awards in Nigeria and has the honor of being the officer of the order of the Federal Republic of Nigeria. He lives in Anambra State.

== Innoson Group and Subsidiaries ==
- Innoson Nigeria Limited Nnewi, manufacturer of motorcycles, tricycles, spare parts and accessories.
- Innoson Tech and Industries Co. Ltd. Enugu, manufacturer of household and industrial plastics, health and safety accessories, storage containers, fixtures and fittings, electrical components and accessories.
- Innoson Vehicle Manufacturing (IVM) Nnewi, manufacturers of capacity city buses, mini and midi buses, pickup trucks and garbage collecting Vehicles.
- General types and Tubes Co. Ltd. Enugu. Manufacturers of tyres and tubes.

== Innoson and Guarantee Trust Bank ==
Innoson sued Guaranty Trust Bank PLC in the High Court of Federal Capital Territory, Abuja, claiming a total sum of 400 billion Naira for damages for their reputation. On 6 February 2014 GTBank appealed against the judgement at the Court of Appeal Ibadan Division.

== Award and honors ==
- Honorary Life Vice President of Nigerian Association of Chambers of Commerce, Industry, Mines & Agriculture (NACCIMA)
- Most Outstanding Indigenous Entrepreneur in the Manufacturing Sector by Enugu Chamber of Commerce, Industry, Mines and Agriculture (ECCIMA)
- Officer of the Order of the Federal Republic (OFR)
- In October 2022, a Nigerian national honour of Commander Of The Order Of The Niger (CON) was conferred on him by President Muhammadu Buhari.
