= Innoson Vehicle Manufacturing =

Nigerian manufacturer of automobilies and buses

Innoson Vehicle Manufacturing Co.
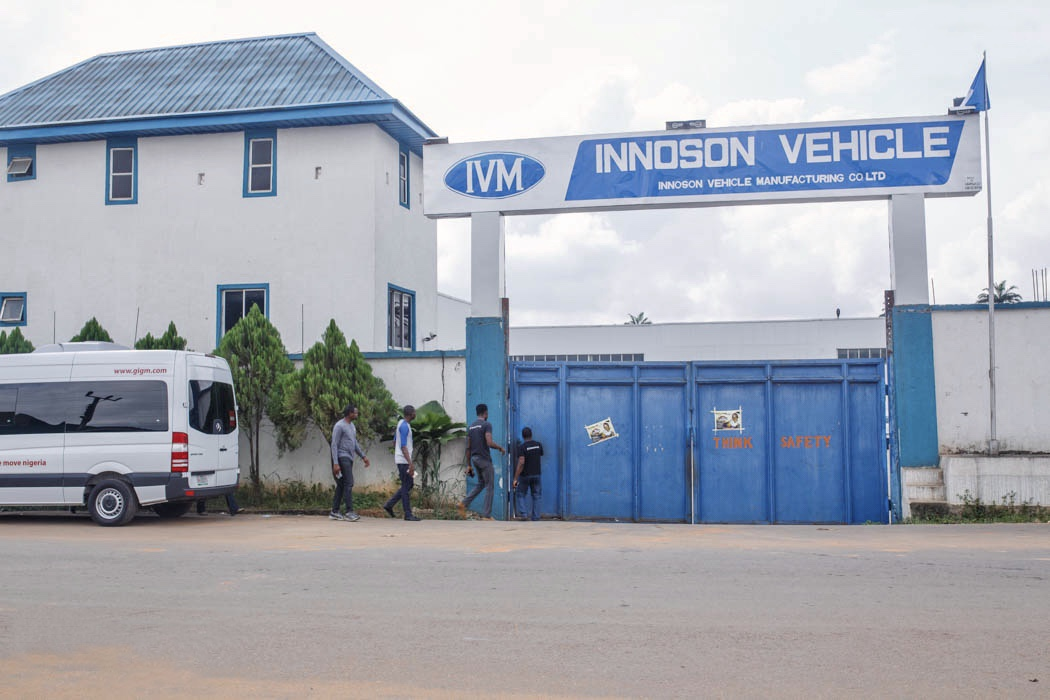
- Industry: Automotive
- Founded: 2007
- Founder: Innocent Chukwuma Nwala
- Headquarters: No 95 Owerri Road, P.O. Box 1068, Umudim, Nnewi, Anambra State
- Area served: Nigeria, Mali, Sierra Leone and Ghana
- Website: https://www.innosonvehicles.com/

Innoson Vehicle Manufacturing Co. Ltd. (commonly shortened to IVM) is a Nigerian automobile manufacturer headquartered in Nnewi, Anambra, Nigeria. It was founded by Chief Innocent Chukwuma Nwala. Innoson Vehicle Manufacturing is nicknamed Pride Of African Roads.

According to the company, 70% of its car parts are produced locally, while the rest are sourced from Japan, China, and Germany.

Among IVM's vehicle models are the five-seaters Fox (1.5-litre engine) and Umu (2-litre engine) as well as the mini-bus Uzo.

== History ==
On 20 May 2022, Innoson presented its first "Keke." Kekes are three-wheeled motor vehicles and one of the main means of transport in Nigeria. They have so far been imported from the Far East and usually cost about 800,000 Naira or 1,600 Euros. Innoson announced a selling price of 500,000 Naira or 1,000 Euros. The production capacity is 60,000 "Kekes" per year. This is to be increased by a new production plant in Owerri in Imo State on a plot of land of 150,000 square metres. The domestic production of the ubiquitous trikes in Nigeria is expected to have a positive impact on Nigeria's trade balance and labour market.

Osuolale Farouq was invited by the company CEO Innocent Chukwuma after he re-designed and shared an improved logo for Innoson Vehicle Manufacturing on Twitter in 2019.

On 1 October 2020, CEO Innocent Chukwuma Nwala while celebrating Nigeria at 60 spoke about the future of IVM. He said the country is all ready for the world of electric cars and IVM is ready and prepared for that change.

On 11 September 2024, Innoson unveiled its first locally made electric vehicle.

== Products ==
- IVM Caris, compact sedan based on the Forthing Jingyi S50
- IVM G20 Smart, compact MPV based on the Keyton EX80
- IVM Ikenga, compact MPV based on the Weiwang M60
- IVM Capa, MPV based on the Forthing CM7
- IVM G5T, mid-size crossover based on the Forthing T5L
- IVM G6T, mid-size SUV based on the Foday Landfort
- IVM G40, off-road vehicle based on the Beijing BJ40
- IVM G80, mid-size SUV based on the Beijing BJ80
- IVM Carrier 4WD, mid-size pickup truck based on the Zhongxing Grand Tiger TUV
- IVM Granite, mid-size pickup truck based on the Zhongxing Terralord
- IVM Mini Bus, microvan based on the Keyton M70
- IVM G5, SUV based on the Gonow G5
- IVM FOX, Sedan based on the Volkswagen Fox

== Other Products ==
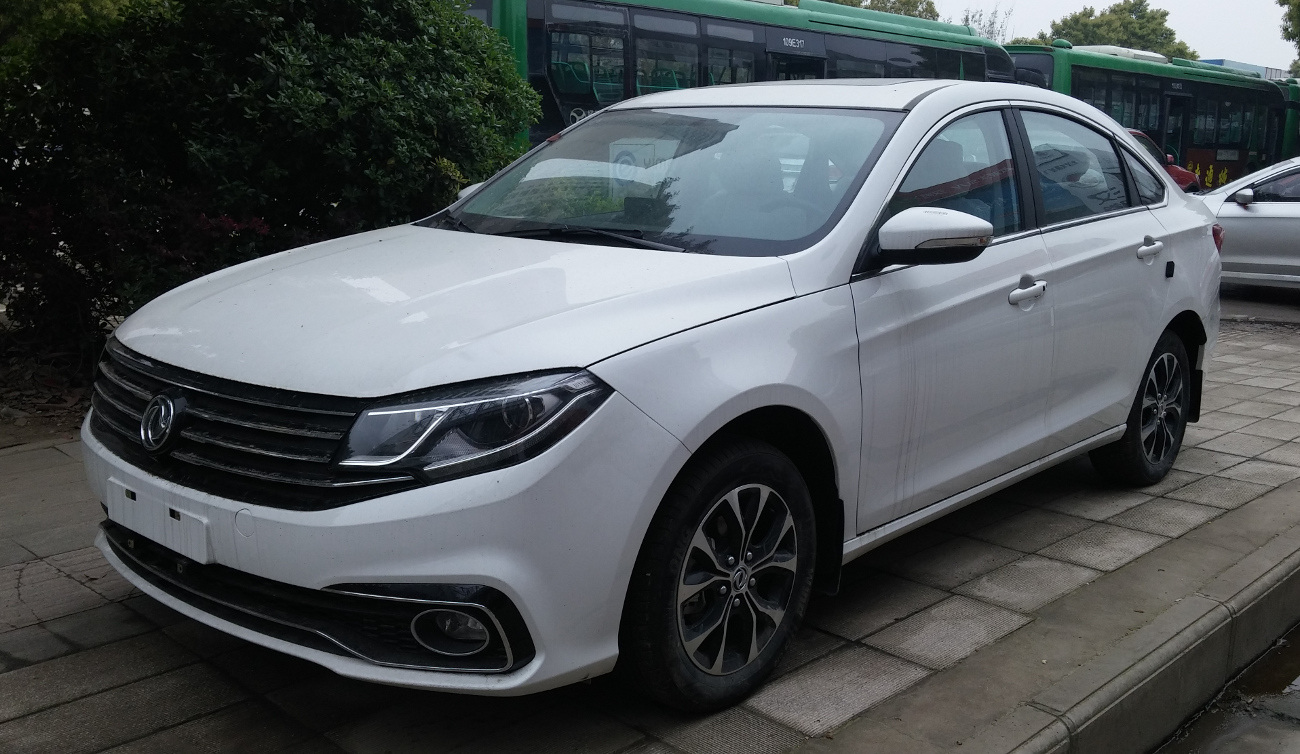
Forthing Jingyi S50 (IVM Caris)

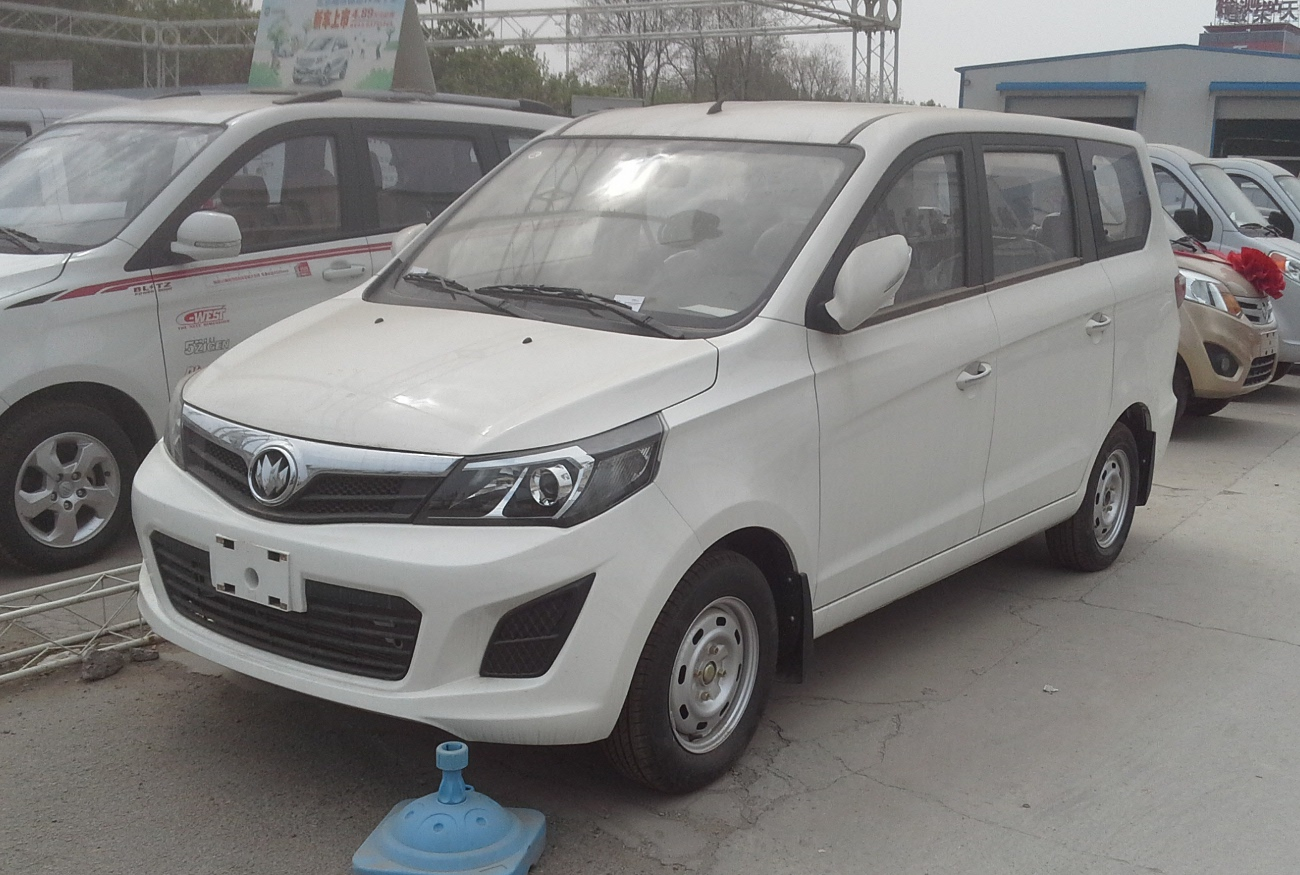
Keyton EX80 (IVM G20 Smart)

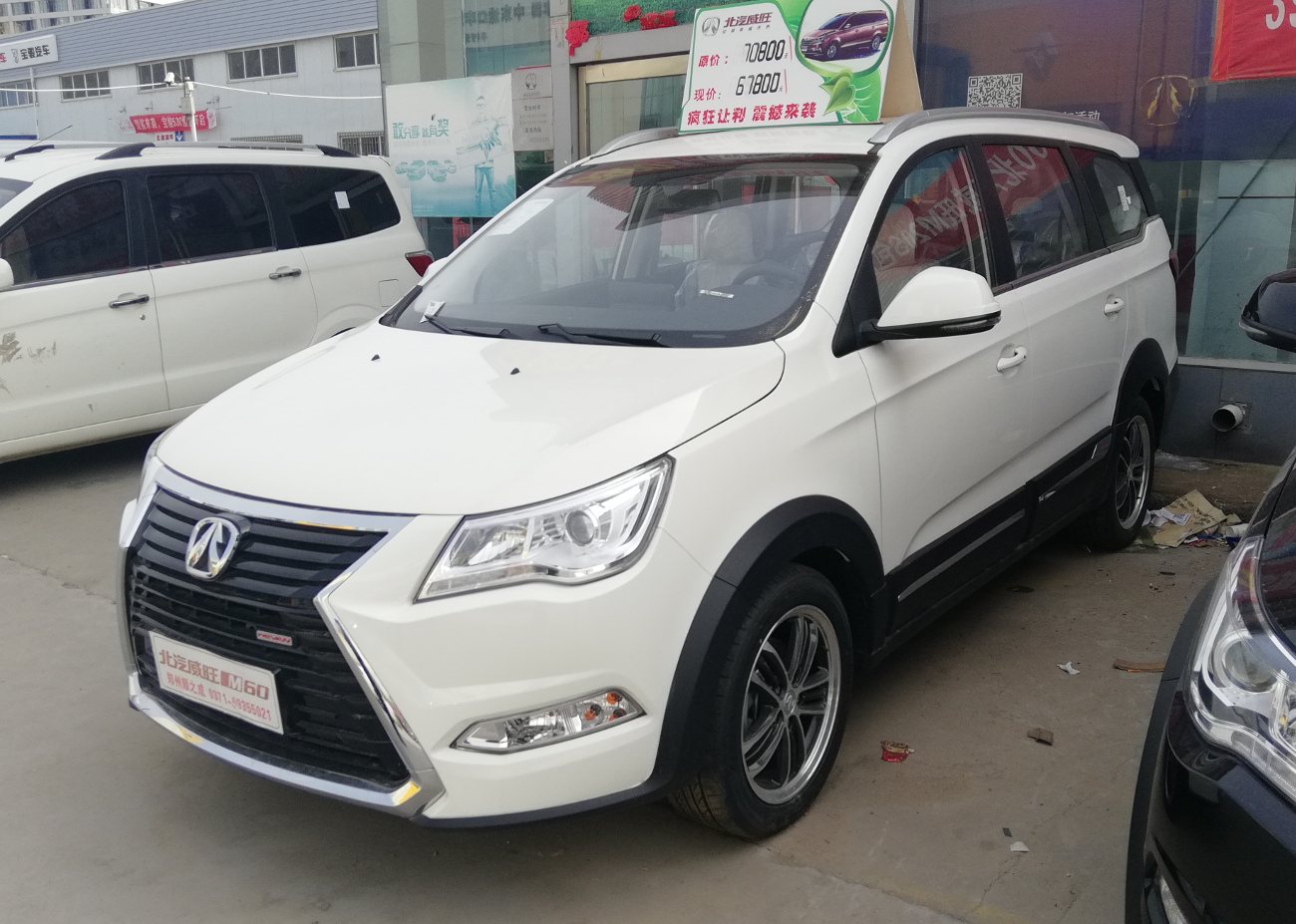
Weiwang M60 (IVM Ikenga)

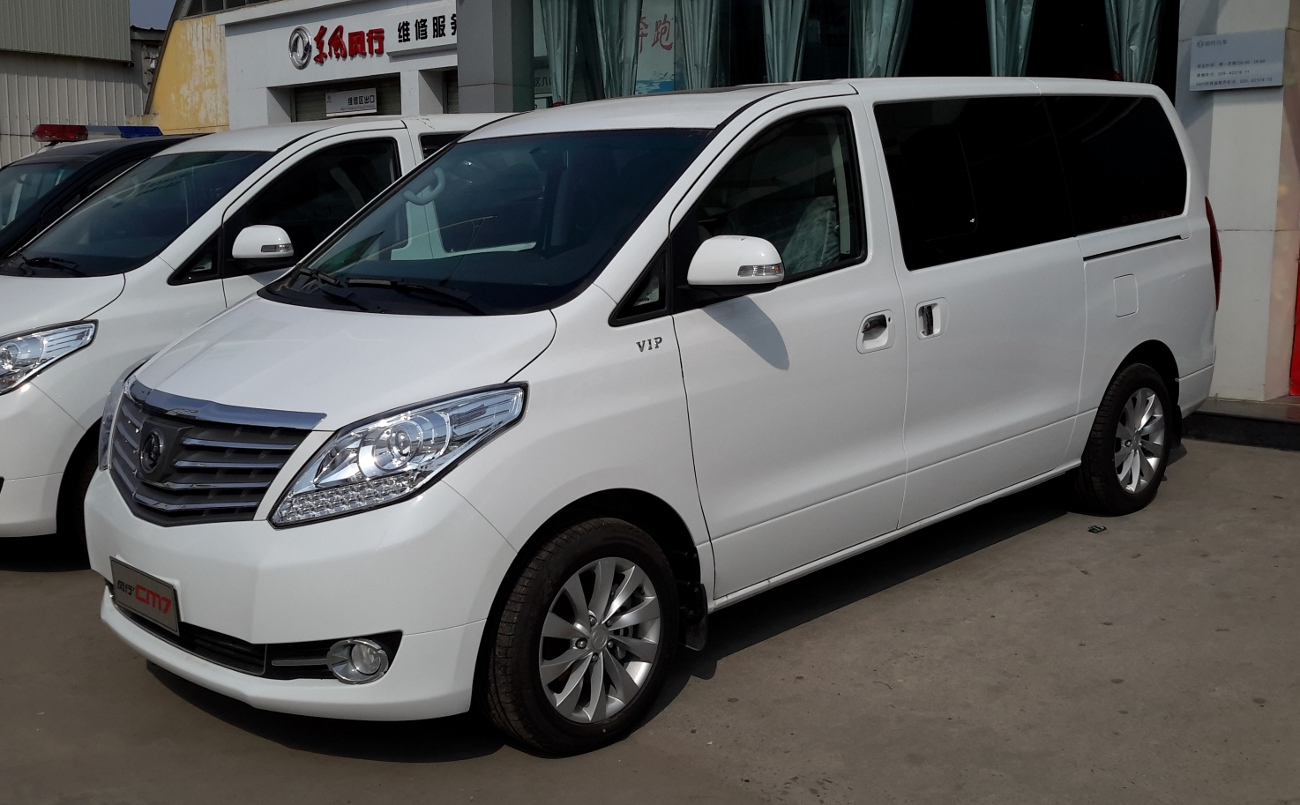
Forthing CM7 (IVM Capa)

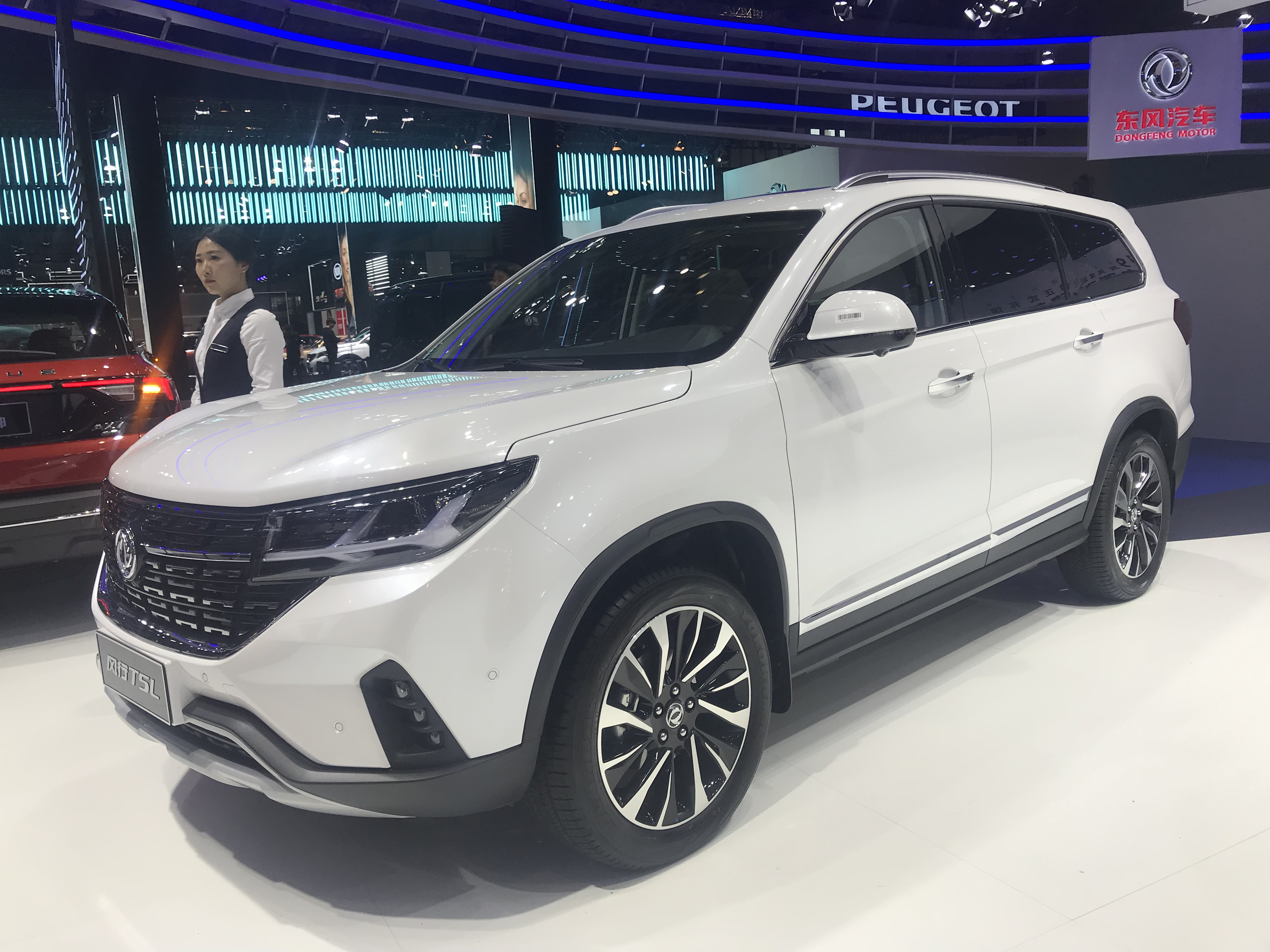
Forthing T5L (IVM G5T)

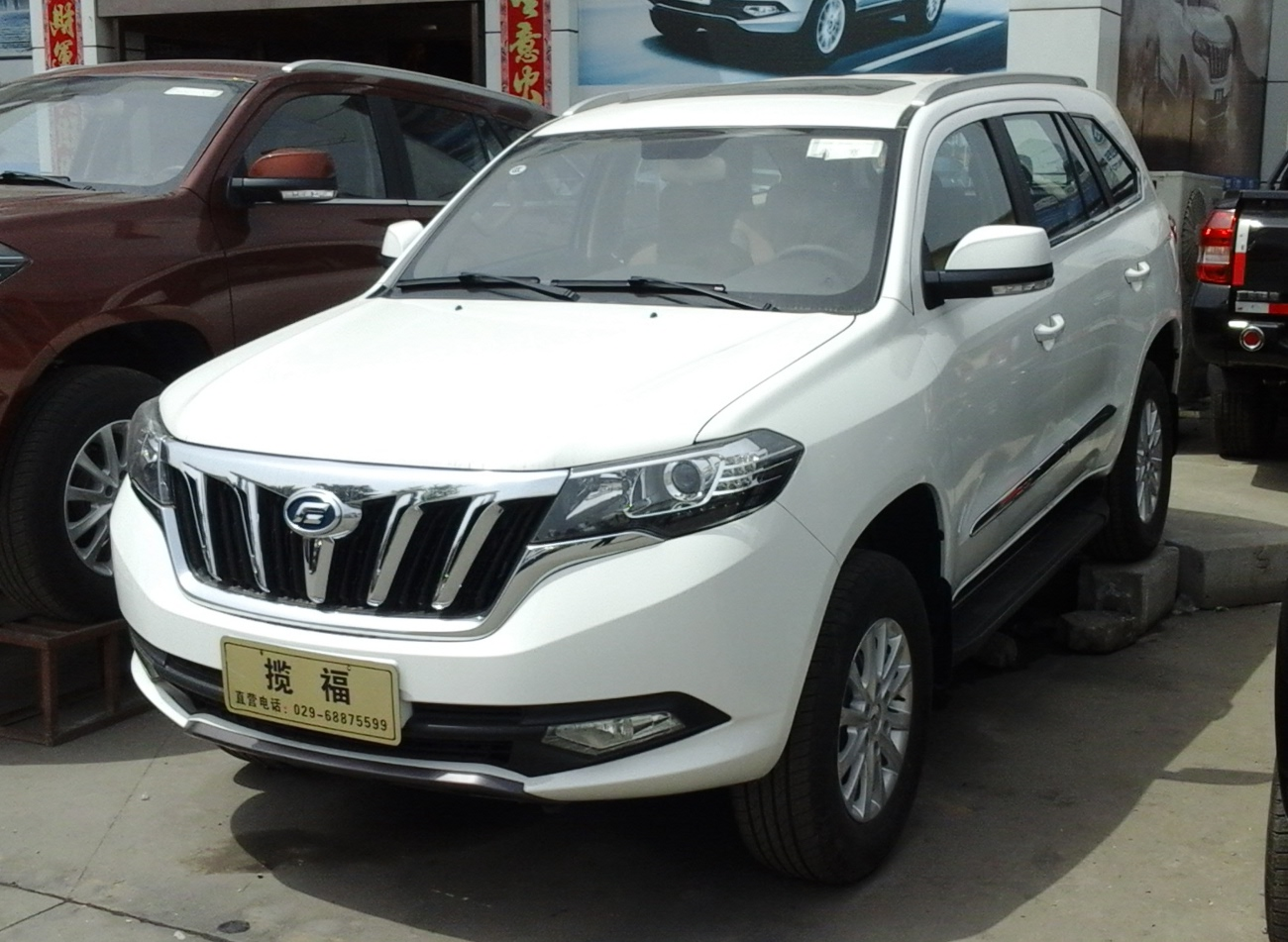
Foday Landfort (IVM G6T)

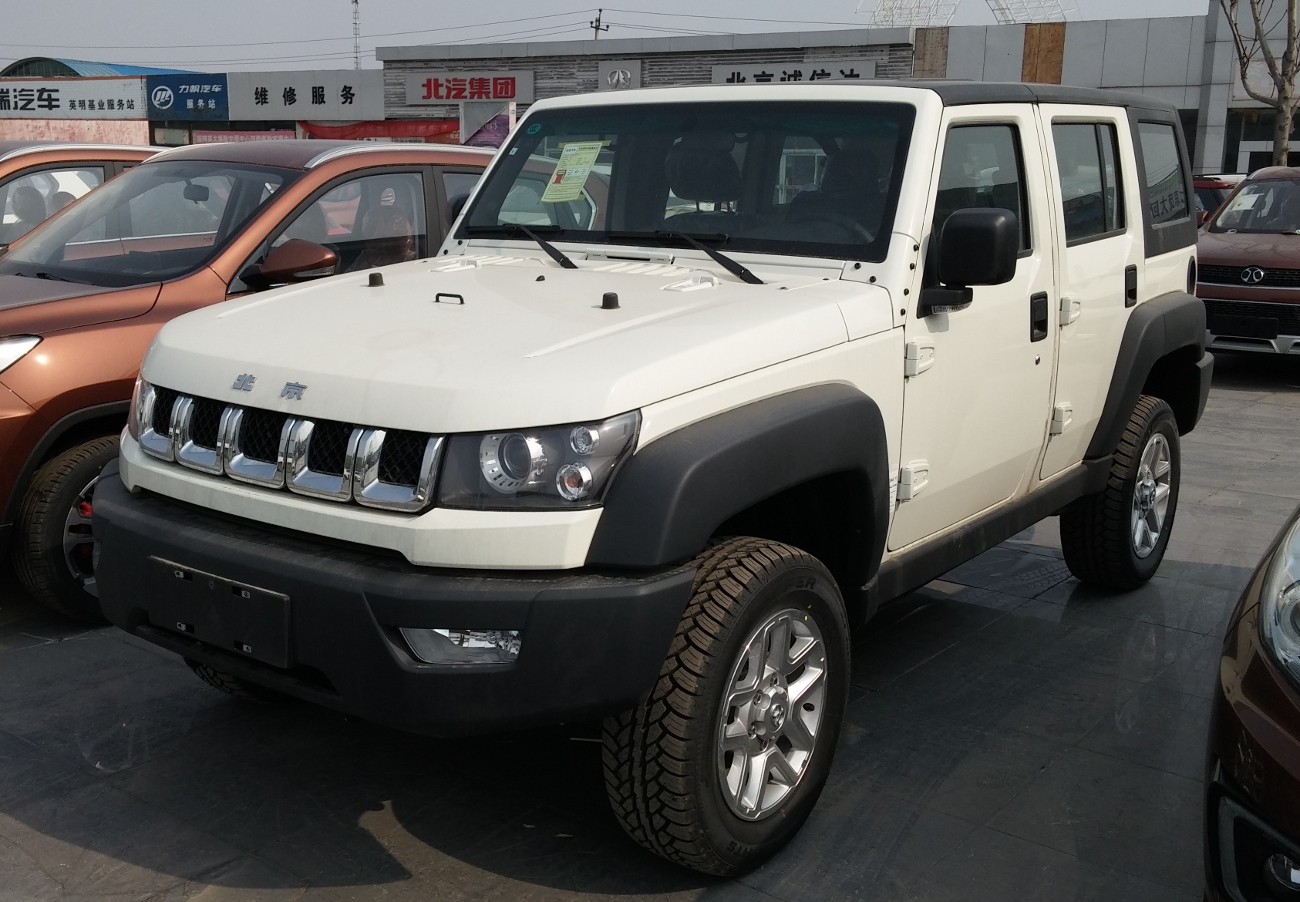
Beijing BJ40 (IVM G40)

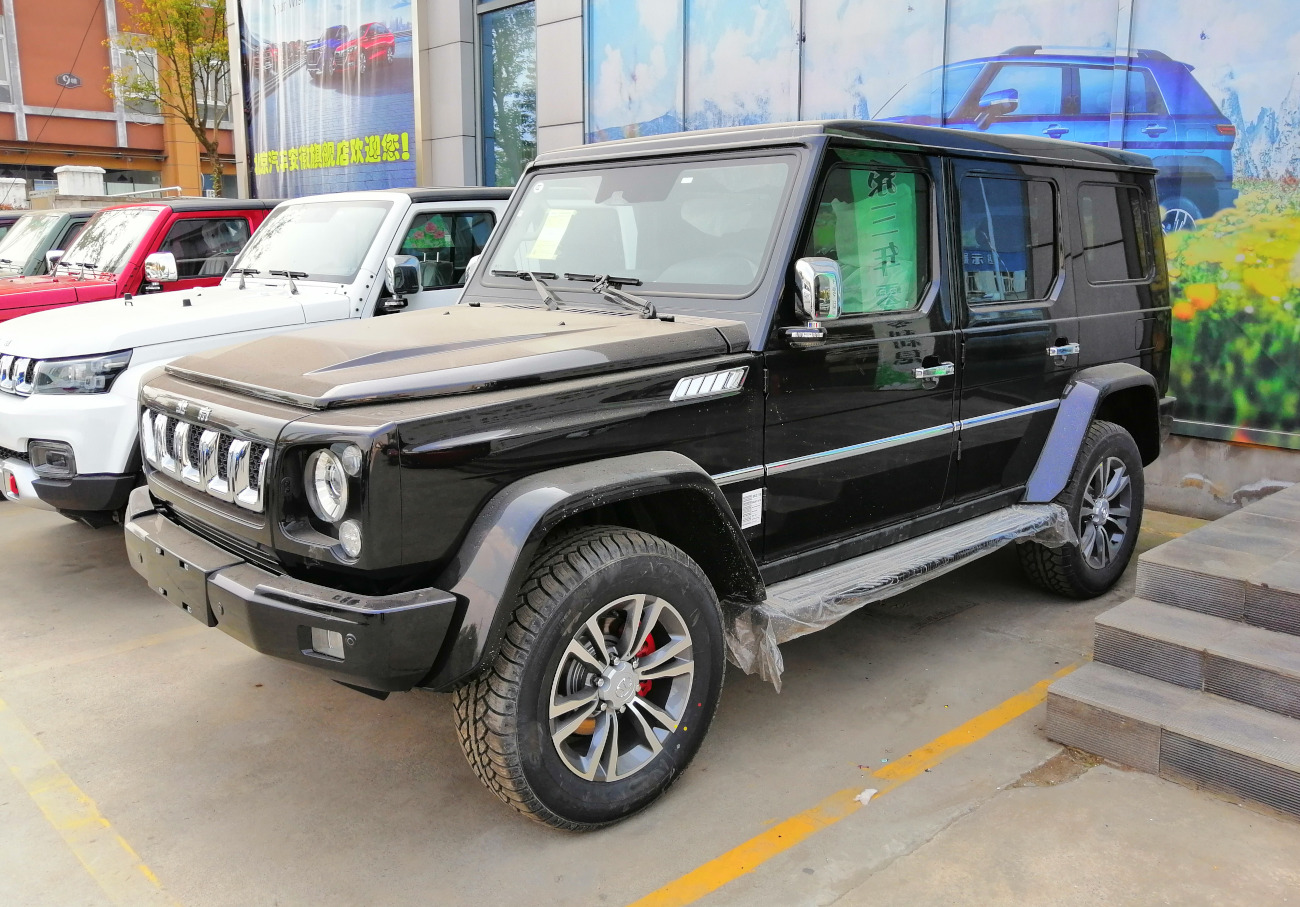
Beijing BJ80 (IVM G80)

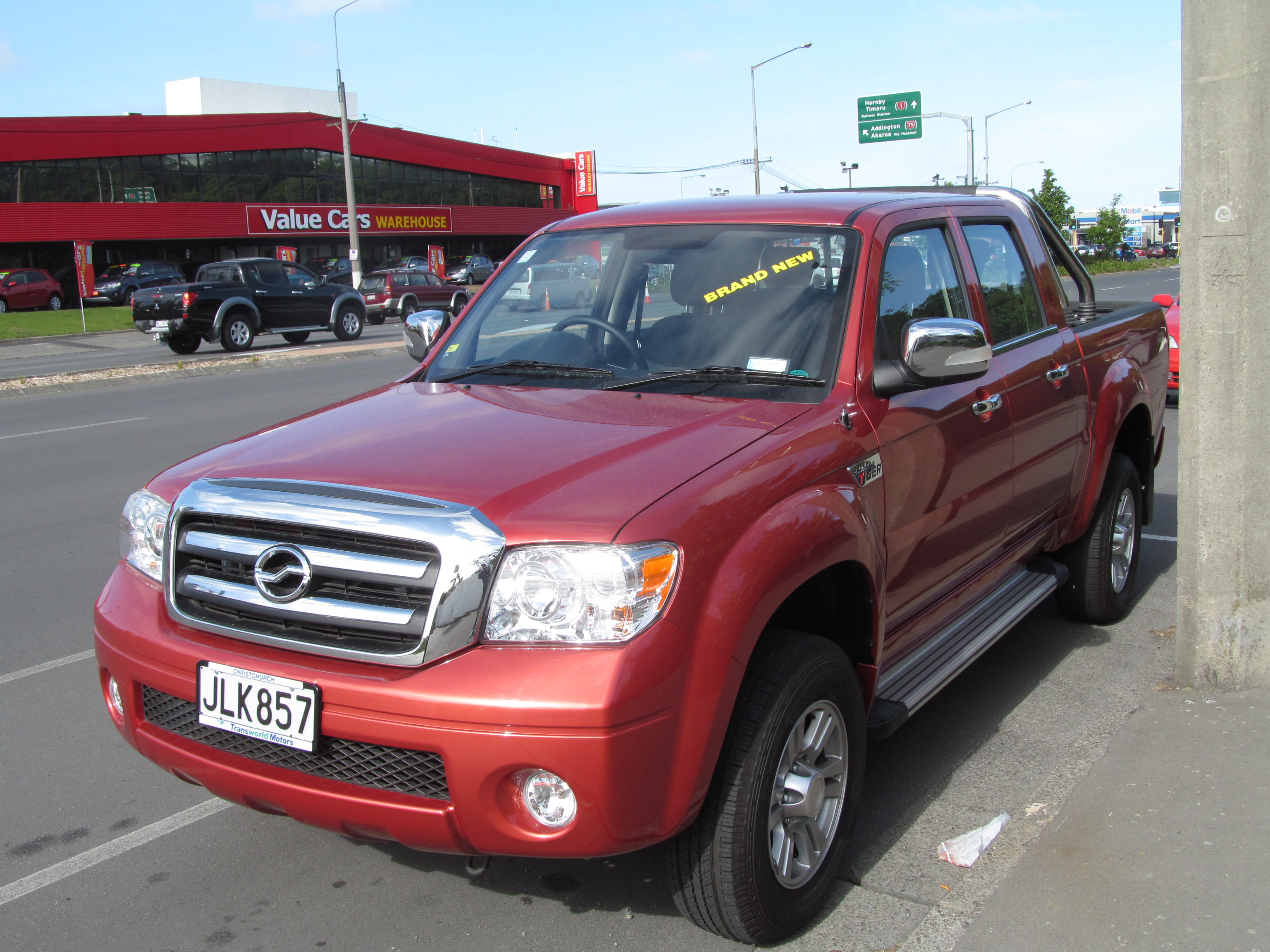
Zhongxing Grand Tiger TUV (IVM Carrier 4WD)

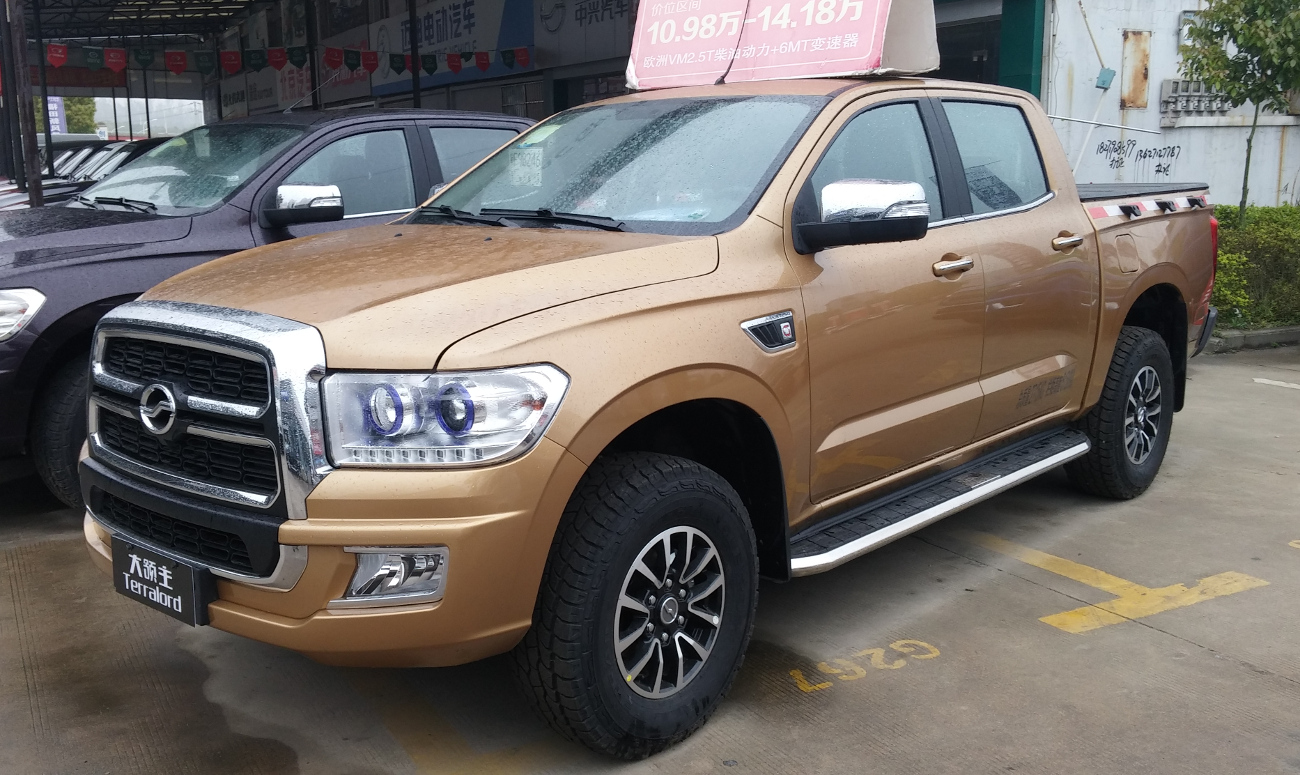
Zhongxing Terralord (IVM Granite)

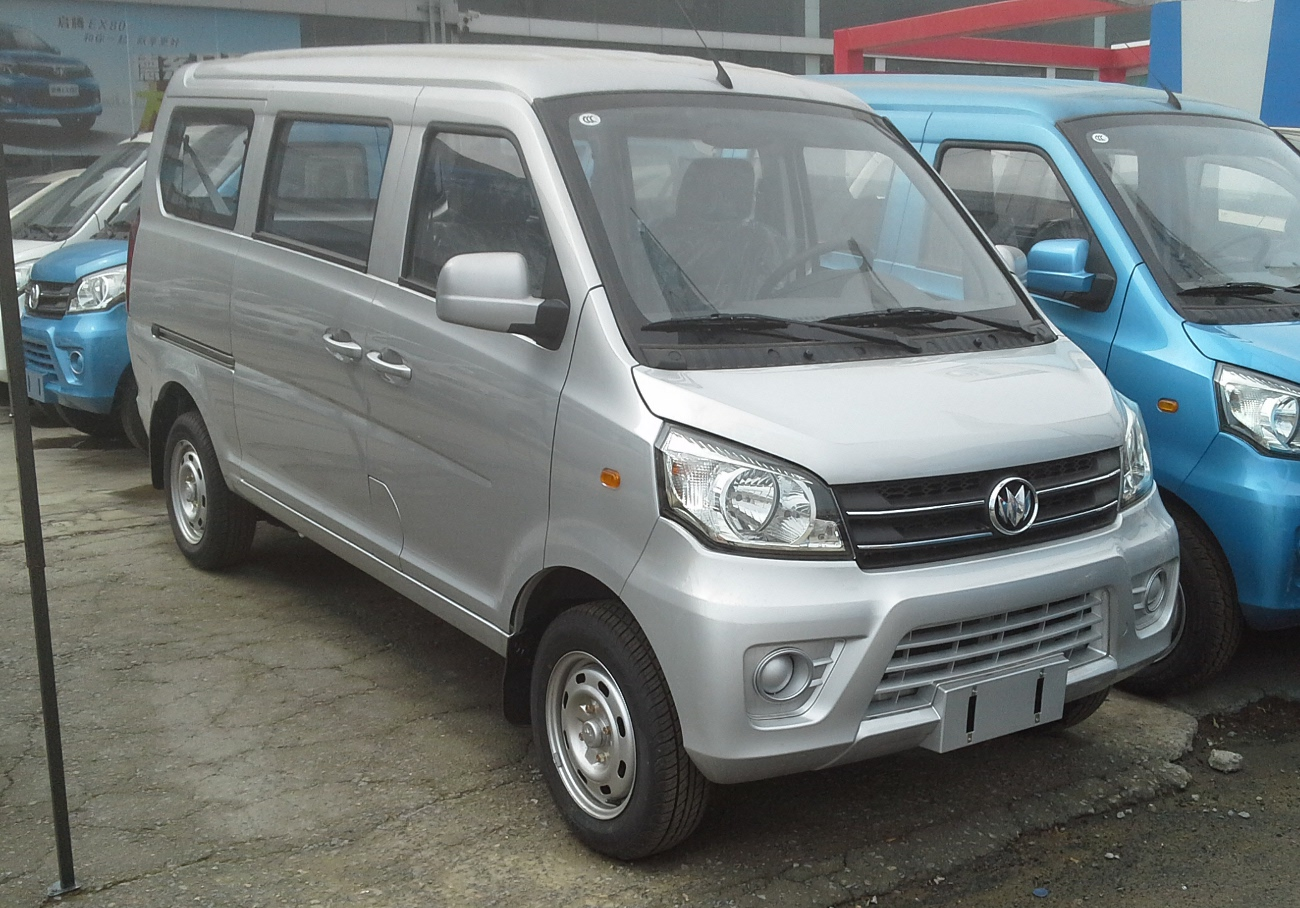
Keyton M70 (IVM Mini Bus)

== Global Presence ==
Innoson vehicles are sold in West African countries such as Mali, Sierra Leone and Ghana.

== Brand Ambassador ==
In October 2019, Mercy Eke, the first female winner of reality show Big Brother Naija, became the brand ambassador for Innoson Vehicles.
