= Bisu M3 =

7 seated multi purpose vehicle

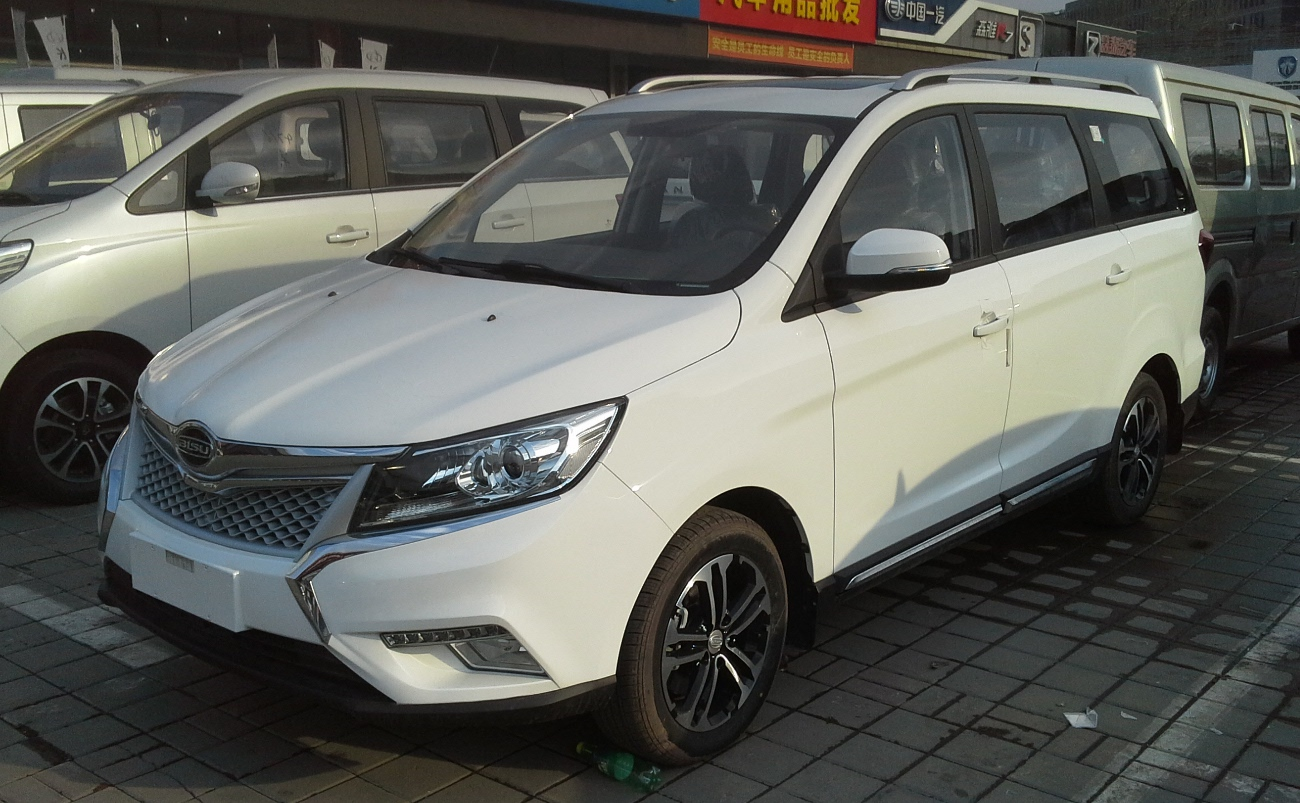

Overview
- Manufacturer: Bisu Auto
- Production: 2016–2019
- Model years: 2017–2019

Body and chassis
- Class: MPV
- Body style: 5-door station wagon
- Layout: FF
- Related: Huansu H3

Powertrain
- Engine: 1.5L I4
- Transmission: 5-speed manual

Dimensions
- Wheelbase: 2,800 mm (110.2 in)
- Length: 4,760 mm (187.4 in)
- Width: 1,810 mm (71.3 in)
- Height: 1,751 mm (68.9 in)
- Curb weight: 1,498–1,564 kg (3,303–3,448 lb)

The Bisu M3 is a 7-seat MPV with a 2-2-3 configuration produced by Bisu Auto, a brand of the Chongqing Bisu Automotive Corporation, which is closely related to Beiqi-Yinxiang, a joint venture between Beijing Auto (Beiqi) and the Yinxiang Group.

== Overview ==
The Bisu M3 was based on the same platform as the Huansu H3 launched in 2015, and was officially launched by the end of 2016 with prices ranging from 61,900 to 83,900 yuan at launch. The power of the Bisu M3 comes from a 1.5-liter four-cylinder petrol engine developing 85 kW (114 hp) and 147 N⋅m (108 lb⋅ft), mated to a five-speed manual transmission powering the front wheels. A 1.5-liter turbo engine with 140 hp (104 kW) was made available from 2017.

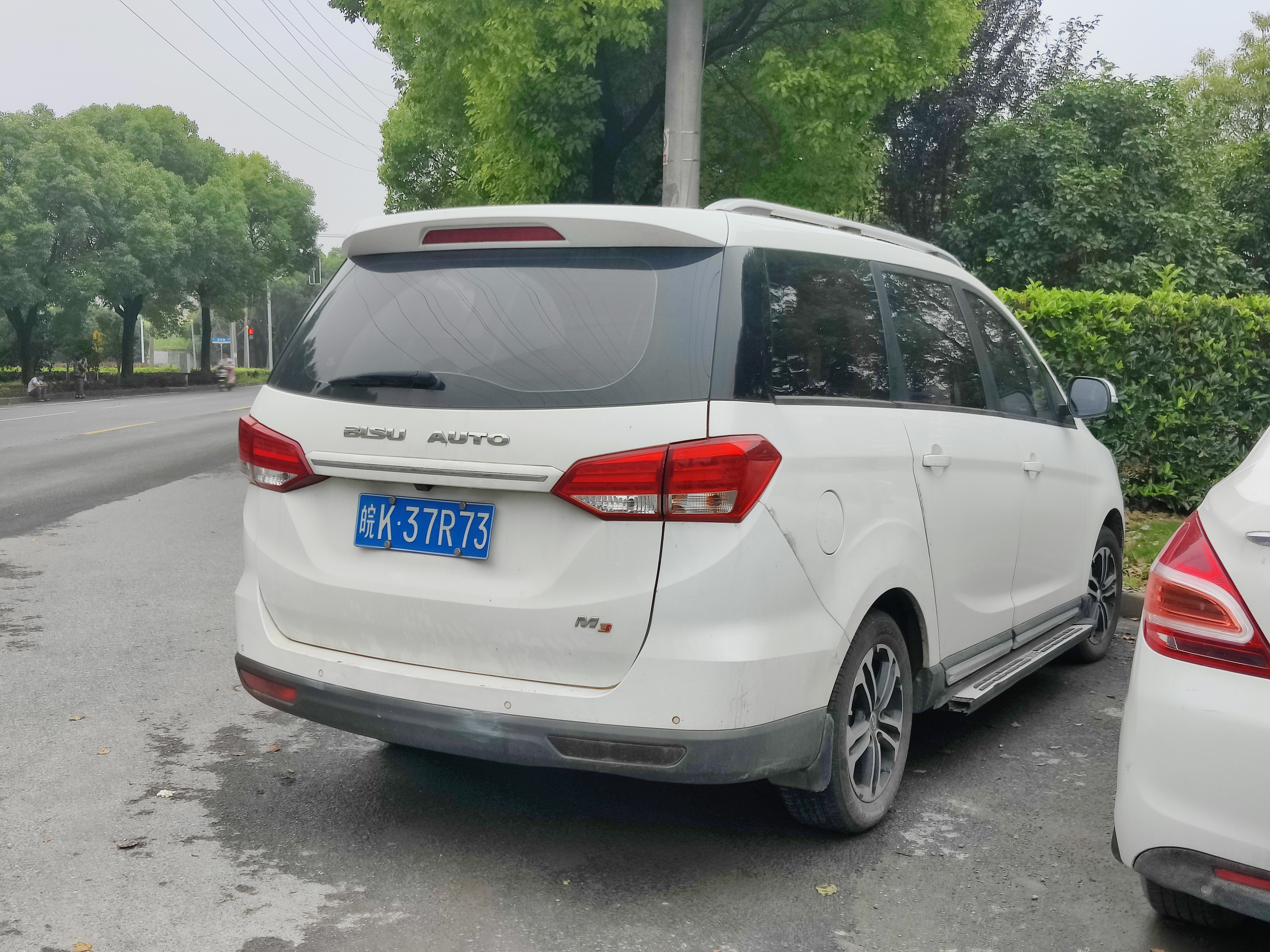
Bisu M3 rear
