= HHH =

HHH may refer to:

== People ==
- H. H. Holmes, one of America's first modern-day serial killers
- Hu Hsen-Hsu (1894–1968), Chinese botanist and scholar
- Hans-Hermann Hoppe (born 1949), Austrian school economist
- Hazem Haj Hassen (born 1996), Tunisian international footballer
- Hubert H. Humphrey (1911–1978), the 38th Vice President of the United States
- Haela Hunt-Hendrix, musician
- Hunter Hearst Helmsley, shortened as HHH or Triple H, ring name of professional wrestler Paul Levesque

== Places ==
- Haven of Hope Hospital, a hospital Tseung Kwan O, in Hong Kong
- Hilton Head Airport, in South Carolina, US
- Hilton Head Island High School, in South Carolina, US
- Holland Heineken House
- Half Hollow Hills Central School District, in New York, US

== Groups, organizations, companies ==
- Hash House Harriers, an international group of running clubs
- Hog Hoggidy Hog, a South African band
- Hot Hot Heat, a Canadian band

== Other uses ==
- Hugo's House of Horrors, a 1990 computer game
- Hungry Hungry Hippos, a 1978 tabletop game
- Hyperornithinemia-hyperammonemia-homocitrullinuria syndrome, a genetic disorder
- HHH(1,13), a run-length limited code developed by Hirt, Hassner, and Heise
- Helpful, honest and harmless, a development framework in AI alignment

== See also ==
- HHHR Tower, in Dubai
- Triple H (disambiguation)
- 3H (disambiguation)
- H3 (disambiguation)
