= Beijing BJ80 =

Mid-size luxury SUV

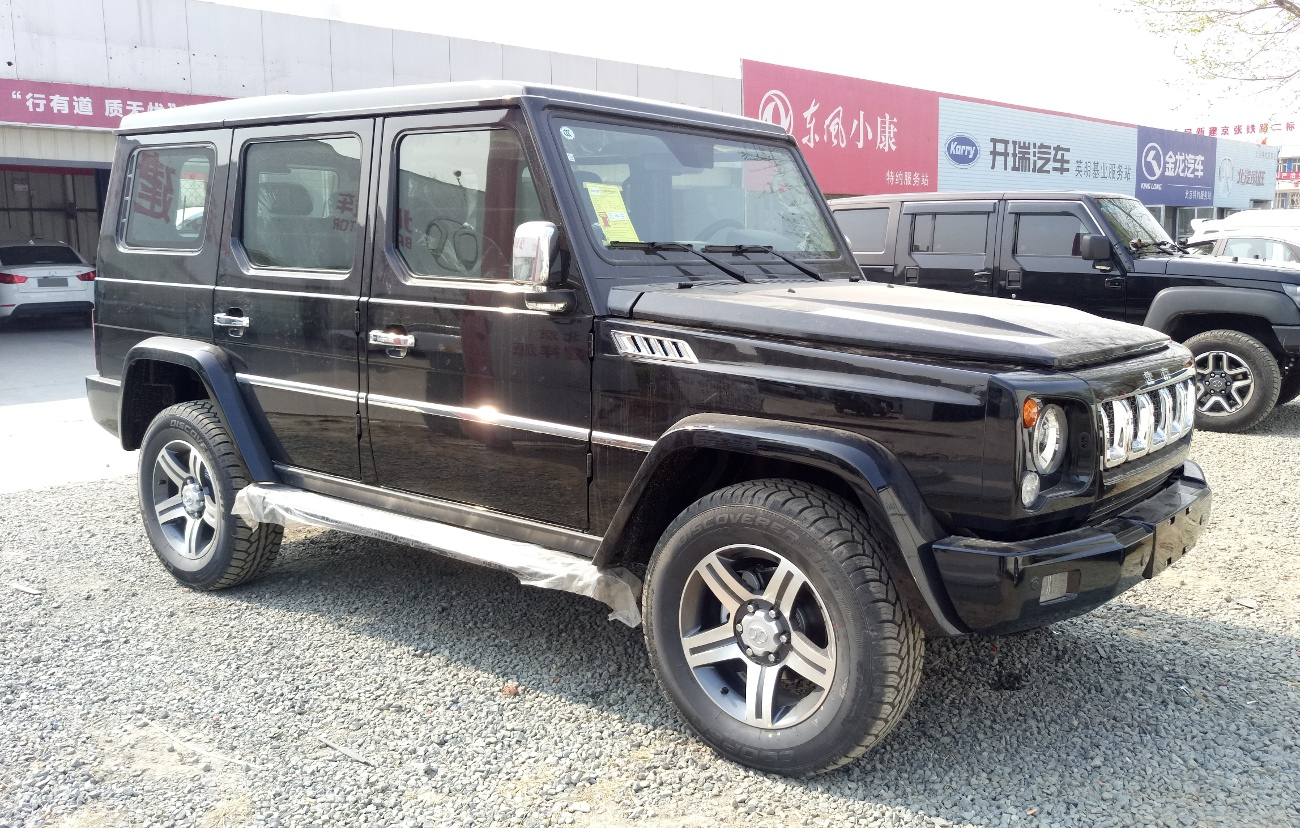
- The Beijing BJ80 parked somewhere in Beijing, China.

Overview
- Manufacturer: BAIC Motor
- Also called: BAIC BJ80; BAIC BJ80C (pre-production); BAIC BJ80J; BAIC BJ80D; SVOS 80 (Czech Republic); IVM G80 (Nigeria)
- Production: 2016–2025
- Assembly: China

Body and chassis
- Class: Mid-size luxury SUV
- Body style: 5-door SUV
- Layout: Front-engine, four-wheel drive

Powertrain
- Engine: Petrol: 2.3 L B231R turbo I4 (2016–2019); 3.0 L Wuling 6G30TQY twin-turbo V6 (2020–2025); Diesel: 2.8 L Cummins ISF turbo I4 (2017)
- Transmission: 6-speed manual (2016–2017); 6-speed automatic (2016–2019); 8-speed automatic (2020–2025)

Dimensions
- Wheelbase: 2,800 mm (110.2 in)
- Length: 4,765 mm (187.6 in); 4,705 mm (185.2 in) (2017)
- Width: 1,890 mm (74.4 in) (2016–2017); 1,847 mm (72.7 in) (2017); 1,955 mm (77.0 in) (2018–2025); 1,975 mm (77.8 in) (2018)
- Height: 2,005 mm (78.9 in) (2016–2019); 2,135 mm (84.1 in) (2017); 1,985 mm (78.1 in) (2020–2025)
- Curb weight: 2,285–2,295 kg (5,038–5,060 lb)

Chronology
- Successor: Beijing 81VJ

The Beijing BJ80 (Chinese: 北京BJ80) is a mid-size four-wheel-drive luxury SUV manufactured by BAIC Motor starting in November 2016 under Beijing Auto Works (BAW), a subsidiary of Beijing Auto Industry Corporation (BAIC).

As of 2016, the vehicle is being marketed with a price from 288,000 yuan to 298,000 yuan ($42,600-44,000).

== History ==
Development of the BJ80 was reported as early as November 28, 2011 when spy shot photos revealed a concept vehicle, initially known as the BJ80V. The patent for the vehicle was revealed on February 15, 2012.

At the time, the BJ80VJ's engines were taken from Nissan-made 2.0/2.2 engines. These were made with manual-only transmissions.

Chinese media announced that development of the BJ80 started in 2012 with the BJ80V being made for the civilian market with the BJ80VJ made for the People's Liberation Army and other government agencies with the initial price set at 200,000 Yuan. The BJ80V debuted in April 2012 at the Beijing Auto Show as a concept vehicle.

The PLA announced that the BJ80 would be deployed in a variety of roles, including command, utility and scout roles.

On November 4, 2013, the PLA was said to be developed an airborne assault vehicle based on the SUV's chassis. Deliveries of the military-based SUV were reported to have started in early 2016 with Yongshi (勇士, Brave Warrior) markings at the rear SUV door.

On December 30, 2013, there were rumors that the BJ80 could have a Saab-based 2.0 turbo engine. It was later confirmed that it would a Saab 2.3 turbo petrol engine.

The SUV, now known as the BJ80, was unveiled as another concept vehicle for the 2014 Beijing Auto Show in April for production. BAIC mentioned that it would be known as the BJ80C during the BAS event. The price was announced at 300,000 Yuan.

The use of the 2.8-liter engine instead of the 3.2-liter diesel engine was finalized by BAIC, but the former would be used for PLA vehicles. During the show, BAIC representatives claimed that the display vehicle was using a 4.0 V8 engine with an automatic transmission system in place.

The BJ80C vehicle was unveiled at the 2015 Shanghai Auto Show. A BJ80C Safari vehicle was also unveiled in the show.

On November 22, 2016, at the Guangzhou Auto Show, BAIC unveiled a version of the BJ80 meant for riot control duties, only available on special orders. It was made in cooperation with Transamerican Auto Parts, an American aftermarket-parts manufacturer that market parts for Jeeps and other off-road cars.

On April 20, 2017, Protean Electric has unveiled a prototype BJ80 PHEV vehicle at the Auto Shanghai 2017 convention to demonstrate its feasibility as an electric vehicle for potential buyers.

Military variants of the SUV are equipped with a Cummins 2.8 liter four-cylinder diesel engine, having a max output on 120 kW (160 hp) and 360 N⋅m (266 lb⋅ft) of torque. They're equipped with BeiDou Navigation Satellite System as a standard feature.

== 1st Generation (2016–2019) ==
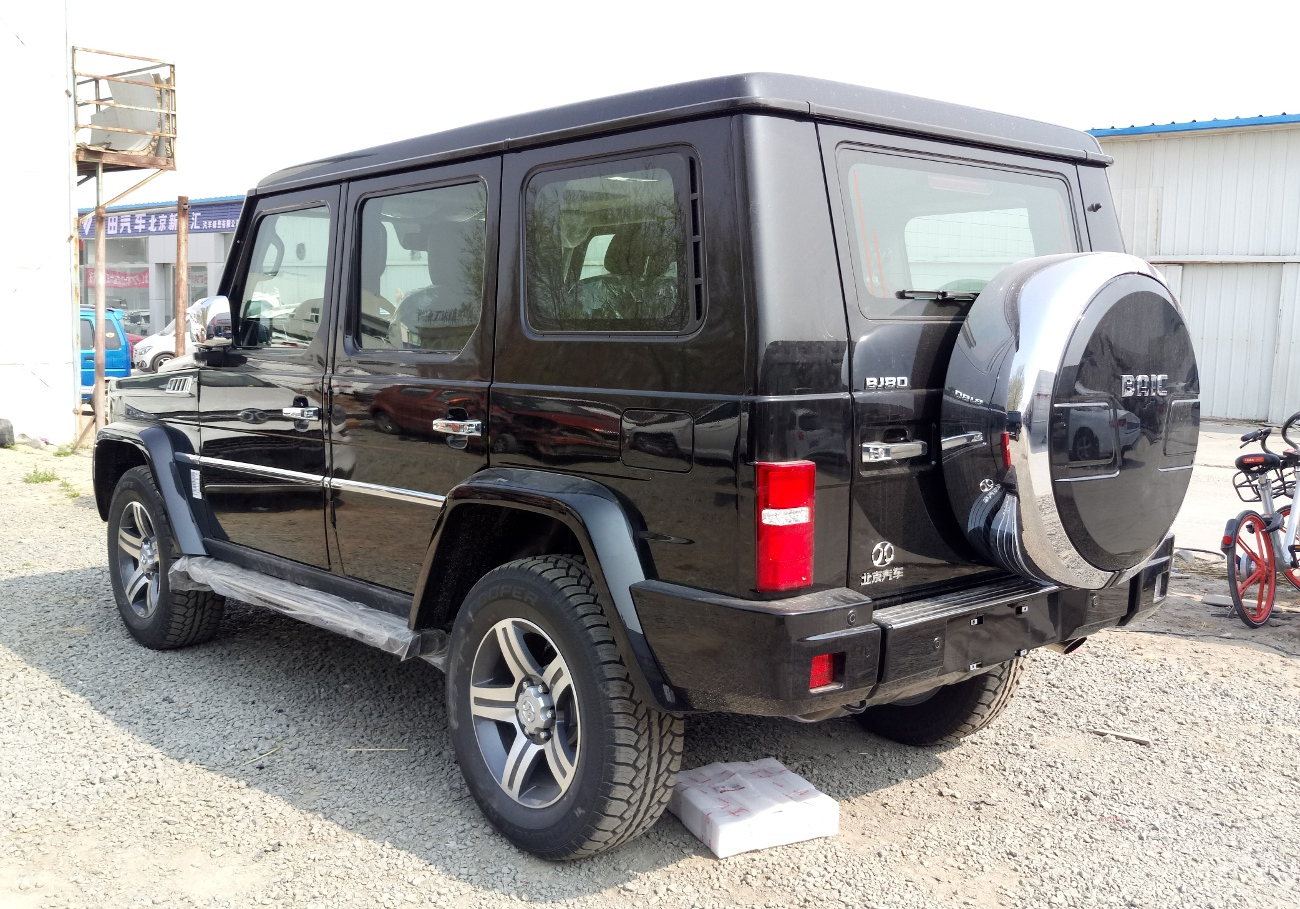
Rear view

On February 16, 2016, the BJ80D was reported to be seen on the road of China, being made with a diesel engine only. The BJ80 is marketed with either 2.8-liter turbodiesel with 122 kW (163 hp) and a 6-speed manual gearbox or a gasoline engine 2.3 T 190 kW (250 hp) with either a manual or automatic transmission, both 6-speed. The manual and automatic transmission has the Reverse gear on the upper left with a dial-type switch to change from high to low gear on the lower right side of the gearstick.

The BJ80 was subsequently launched by BAIC on November 3, 2016, without the C included in the name.

On December 26, 2016, BAIC released a luxury version of the BJ80 with new front and rear bumpers, new alloys, red brakes, a new bonnet with an air scoop and two individual rear seats instead of the 3-seat bench.

On July 30, 2017, the BJ80 appeared in the 90th anniversary of the People's Liberation Army (PLA) to serve as Xi Jinping's vehicle for general inspection.

== Derivatives ==
=== 6x6 ===
On April 24, 2018, BAIC unveiled the 6x6 version of the BJ80 for the Beijing Motor Show.

=== SVOS 80 ===
At IDET 2017, the Czech armored vehicle company SVOS unveiled the SVOS 80, presented by SVOS in cooperation with BAIC as a proof of concept. It is planned to offer the SVOS 80 for export throughout Europe. There are also plans to market the SUV for military use outside of China. According to SVOS, the vehicle was developed in order to provide a cheap alternative to the Land Rover Defender.

The SVOS 80 has a 2.8-liter, four-cylinder Cummins diesel engine rated at EURO 4 emissions compliance, developing 120 kW (161 hp) and 340 N⋅m (251 lb⋅ft) of torque. A ZF automatic gearbox is fitted, coupled to a two-speed transfer case with selectable four-wheel drive.

=== IVM G80 ===
The Innoson Vehicle Manufacturing has announced the development of the IVM G80 for the African market on December 11, 2017. The G80 has a 2.4L Mitsubishi 4G69S4N engine with a top speed of 99 mph.

As of 2020, the G80 retails for ₦27,825,000.

== Update (2020–2025) ==
On June 18, 2020, BAIC unveiled the 2020 model with a new 3.0 V6 engine and 8-speed automatic transmission. It retails at 350,000 yuan.

In April 2024, the BJ80 is retailed in the Philippines as the B80.

== Military Operators ==
- China: Used by the People's Liberation Army.
- Lebanon: 60 B80VJ SUVs provided to Lebanese Armed Forces in June 2021 as part of Chinese military assistance.
- Nigeria: G80s used by Nigerian Army officers.

=== Non-State Actors ===
- United Wa State Army

== Variants ==
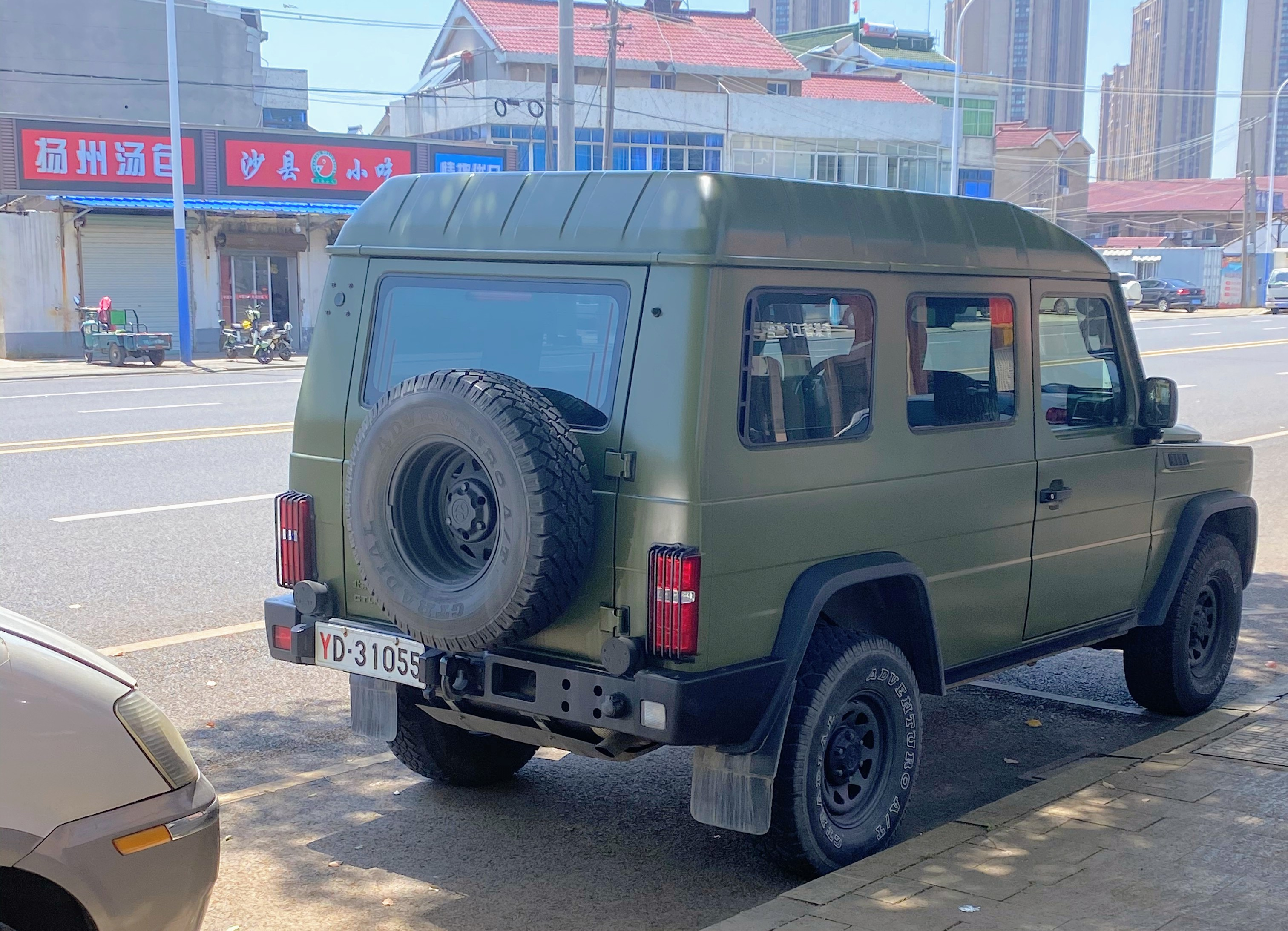
Beijing BJ80J CTL-151B

- BJ80C: Old name for the BJ80 (C meaning civilian), now defunct.
- BJ80D: BJ80 with a diesel-only engine.
- BJ80V: Concept SUV for civilian use, now defunct for the BJ80C name.
- BJ80VJ: Concept SUV for the People's Liberation Army with Nissan 2.0/2.2 engines.
- BJ80J: The basic military version of the BJ80. It was made available with soft/hard top covers, two-door hardtop with pickup and heightened roofs.
  - CTL-151A: A five-door version of the BJ80 with a seating capacity of four passengers plus driver.
  - CTL-151B: A three-door version of the BJ80 with a seating capacity of seven passengers plus and a raised roof.
- SVOS 80: A Czech-made version of the BJ80 made under a joint venture between BAIC and SVOS with a Cummins engine.
- Armored vehicle with steel and kevlar plating. It is known as Riot Control Car.

== Controversy ==
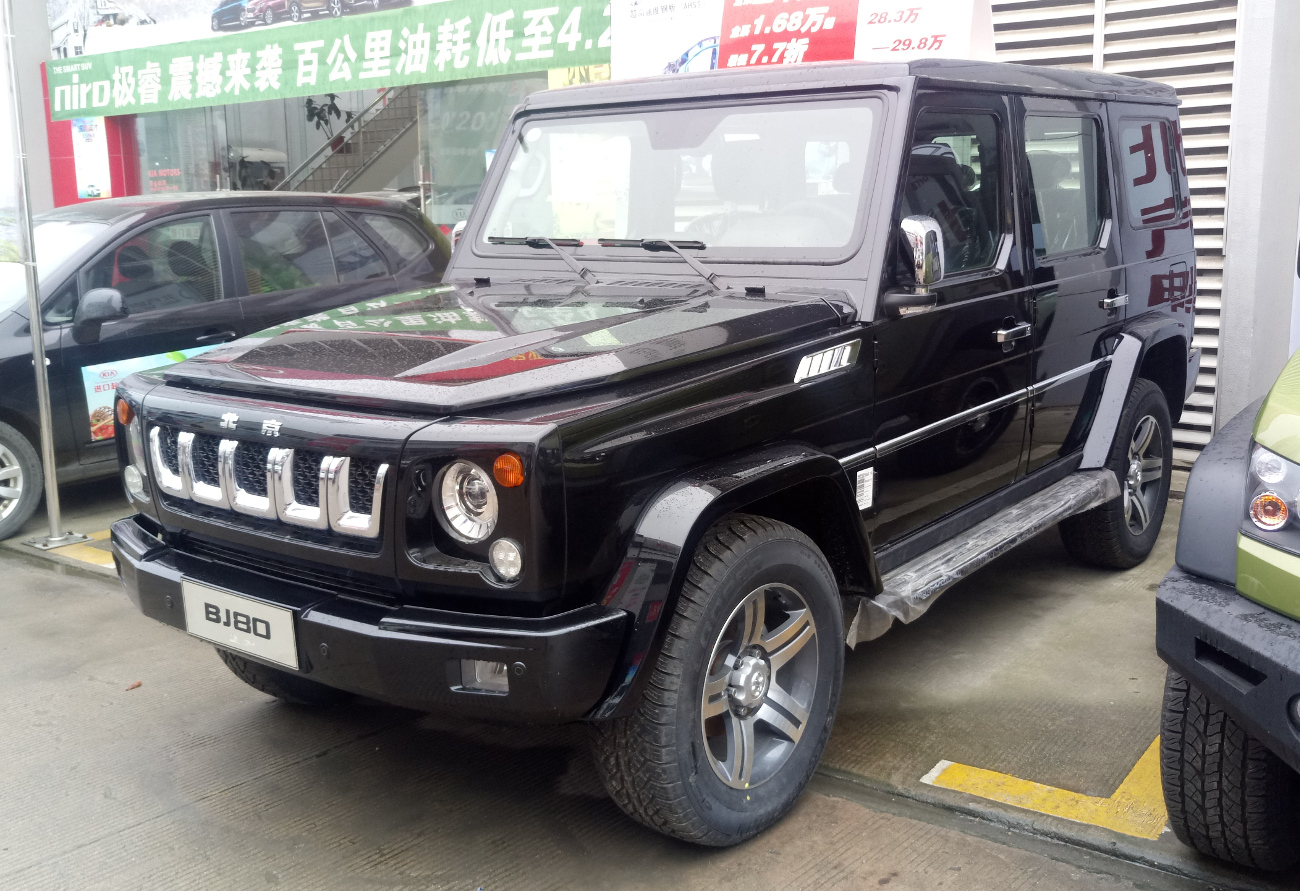
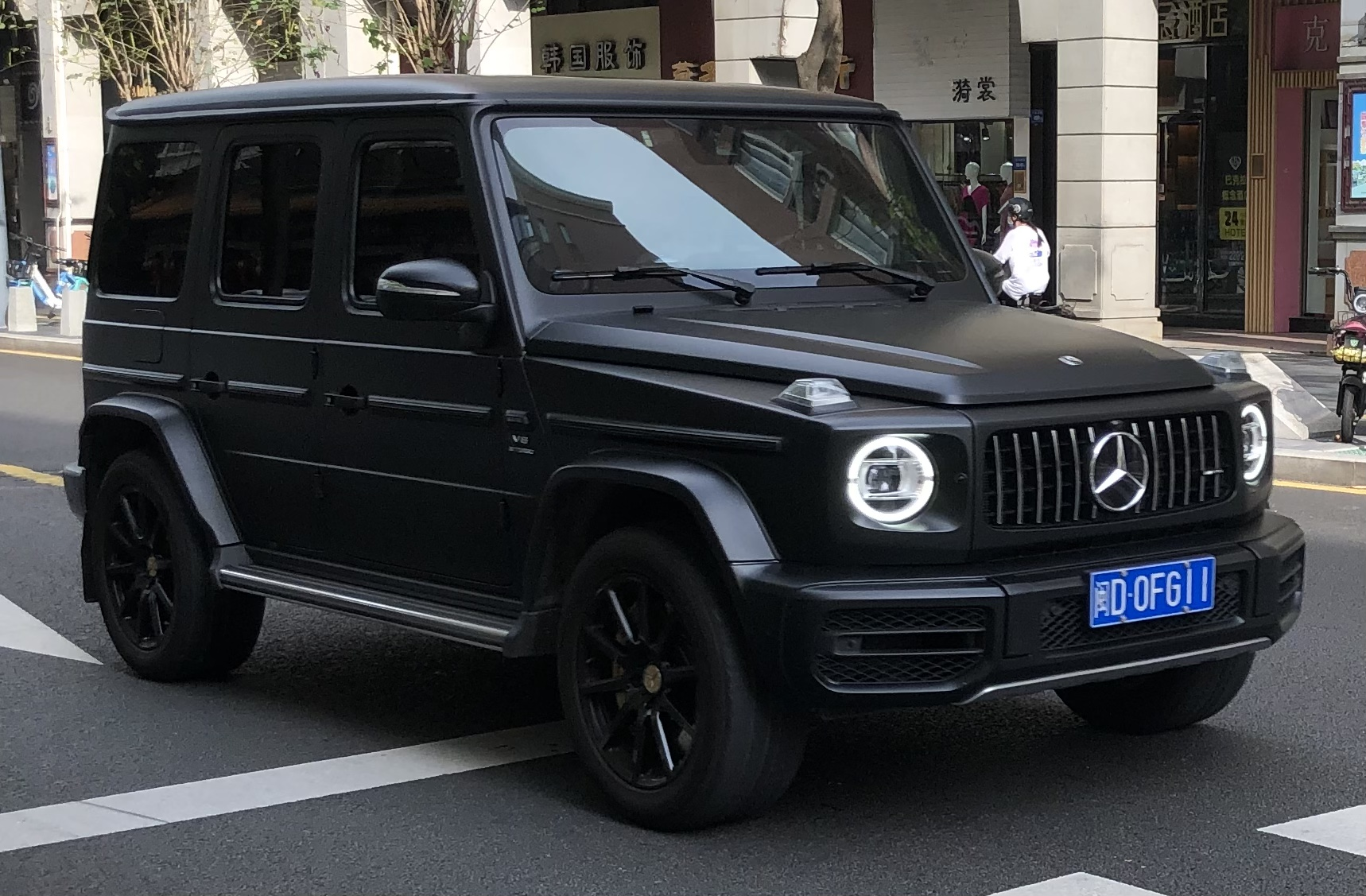
The Beijing BJ80 (left) and Mercedes-Benz G-Class (right).

The BJ80 is a contention of controversy since it resembles the G-Class by Mercedes-Benz, which was pointed out by Mercedes-Benz spokesperson Toby Mueller via Instagram.

In 2015, rumors were abound that Daimler were not pleased with BAIC copying the look of the G-Class Wagon with plans to force the company to kill the marketing of the vehicle.

While the G-Wagon has influenced it, aspect of the vehicle was also based on Beijing Qishi S12, a Beijing-made Jeep Cherokee.

In 2018, the BJ80 was put in a test against the G-Wagon in Yongding, Anhui Province under PLA supervision. Critics have accused the PLA of conducting the tests in favor of the BJ80 due to them supervising and evaluating the two SUVs since Mercedes has more experience and history in manufacturing and marketing the G-Wagon.

== Sales ==
As of 2019, around 568 BJ80s were sold in China.

Year	China
2023	802
2024	265
2025	137
