= 3H Biomedical =

Swedish biotechnology company

- Company type: Limited
- Industry: Biotechnology
- Founded: 2004
- Headquarters: Uppsala, Sweden
- Key people: Mallen Huang (CEO)
- Products: Bioscience products and contract research.
- Website: www.3hbiomedical.com

3H Biomedical is a biotechnology company based in Uppsala, Sweden, where it operates out of Uppsala Science Park. The company develops, produces and markets cell-based tools for life science, tissue engineering, drug discovery and cosmetics testing. 3H Biomedical also offers contract research services. The company's research and development focus lies in the fields of cell immune therapy and adult stem cell therapy.

== History ==
3H Biomedical was founded in 2004 as a spring off from Uppsala University. In the same year 3H Biomedical was awarded with the foundation of innovation of Handelsbanken Uppsala award. The award was presented for commercially interesting research in the field of DNA-based vaccines. The company started out marketing and selling primary cells, and has since extended its portfolio with cell chips, RNA, DNA, recombinant proteins, blood serum and plasma, vectors for genetic modification and cell-based assays.
