= 3H Movement =

Turkish-based think tank

- Founded: 6 December 2006
- Type: Not-for-profit, non-governmental organization
- Purpose: Human rights, Liberal democracy, Civil constitution, Public policies, Secularism
- Location(s): Istanbul and Ankara, Republic of Turkey
- Region served: Republic of Turkey
- Method: Seminars, Activism
- Members: 100+
- Volunteers: 2000+
- Formerly called: Liberal ofis (Liberal Office)

The 3H Movement (3H Hareketi or Hürriyet Hukuk Hoşgörü Hareketi in Turkish) is a classical liberal youth organization with more than a 2,000 members and volunteers that has been active since December 2006, when it was first founded under the name Liberalofis. Since then, the 3H Movement has been arguing against illiberal ideologies such as socialism, conservatism, fascism, and nationalism in Turkey. The movement has a daily-updated website where the members publish their articles on various economic and political issues with a liberal viewpoint. Current president of executive board of the organization is Serkan Can.

== The 3H Manifesto ==
- The current constitution of Turkey is a product of the 80's coup d'état. Turkey must adopt a liberal constitution.
- The government of Turkey must under all circumstances obey the rule of law.
- Turkey is a country with a diverse population. The government must tolerate diversity (e.g. ethnical, cultural, social and sexual) within the country.
- Turkey needs an effective free market economy. The current statist approach, bureaucracy and high taxes hinder the free market. These three obstacles must be abolished.
- Liberty is the premiere of human rights. It must be protected by law and shall be approached by tolerance.
- The economy can not be governed or guided.
- Religious preferences or sexual orientations of individuals must be respected.
- Individuals must in all circumstances have a freedom to associate with particular respect to their personal beliefs and ideas, and thus spread them.
- State authorities shall not assume a privilege of having a say about the personal lives of individuals.
- Public institutions shall be privatized according to efficiency and productivity criteria.
- Individual liberties can only be restricted by the liberties of others.
- The education of children must belong to their parents.
- Neither private nor public, any institution shall be exempt from judicial review.
- For justice in tax distribution, progressive and increasingly high income taxes shall be removed.
- Only defensive wars can be legitimized.
- All victimless crime and voluntary agreements shall be excluded from being a criminal offense.
- The state shall not have a religion nor use religion for purposes of its own.

== The Projects ==
In order to reach its target 3H Movement runs some continuous projects.

=== The Liberal Youth Congress ===
The movement claims that it is Turkey's only annual liberal youth gathering. The main aim of the project is to have annual gathering for the liberal youth to share ideas about the organization. In 2012 it will be held first time as an international congress. The project is funded by Friedrich Naumann Foundation, European Liberal Forum and 3H Movement.

=== Freedom en Route ===
This is another annual project. For two weeks the members of the organization from all over Turkey travels all regions of Turkey. Every two days they settle in another university of another city and hold conferences on another subject that 3H members from that University had chosen. Famous Liberal scholars and columnists join the trip in order to give speech at the universities. The project, proposed and funded by the Atlas Economic Research Foundation in co-sponsored by the Smith Family Foundation.

Some Subjects discussed are Turkey's possible integration into the European Union, human rights protection, democracy vs. authoritarianism, taming the role of the military in Turkish politics, tolerance for minorities, especially the Kurds, and what it means to be liberal in a culture deeply influenced by socialism, nationalism, and Islam.
