= H3 (pyrotechnics) =

Pyrotechnic composition

H3 is a pyrotechnic composition which is used mostly as a burst charge for small diameter shells. It is friction and shock sensitive, as are most compositions containing chlorates. For this reason, H3 should be mixed using the "diaper method" and not with a ball mill. The composition consists of:

- Potassium chlorate (KClO_{3}) (oxidizing agent) - 70%
- Charcoal (fuel) - 30%
- Dextrin (binder) - 2% (additional percent)

Due to the potassium chlorate, H3 should not be mixed with sulfur or compositions containing sulfur, as sulfur increases the sensitivity of the mixture.
