= Huansu H3 =

7 seated multi purpose vehicle

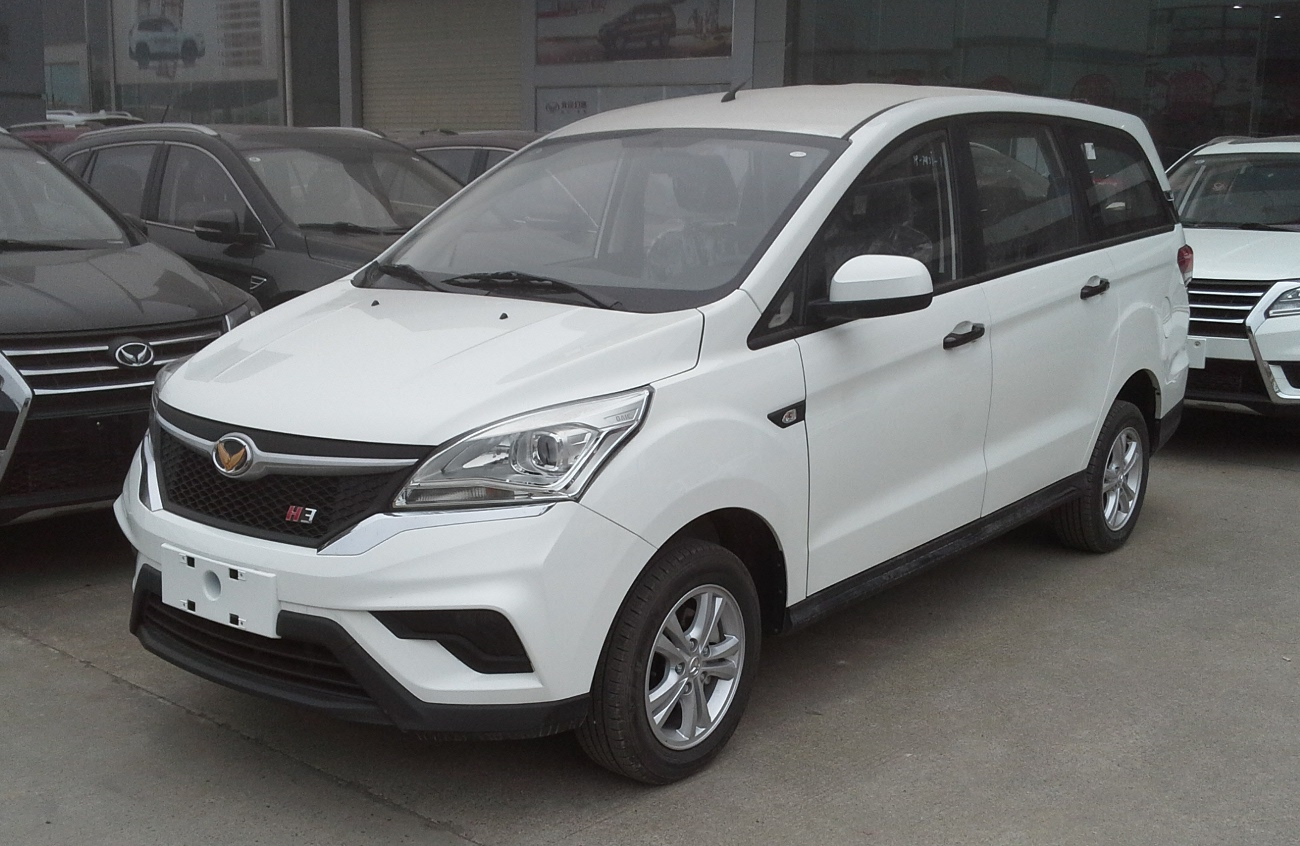

Overview
- Manufacturer: Huansu
- Production: 2015–2019
- Model years: 2015–2019

Body and chassis
- Class: MPV
- Body style: 5-door station wagon
- Layout: FF
- Related: Bisu M3

Powertrain
- Engine: 1.5L 'I4
- Transmission: 5-speed manual

Dimensions
- Wheelbase: 2,800 mm (110.2 in)
- Length: 4,660 mm (183.5 in)
- Width: 1,770 mm (69.7 in)
- Height: 1,800 mm (70.9 in)
- Curb weight: 1,424–1,428 kg (3,139–3,148 lb)

The Huansu H3 is a 7-seat MPV produced by Huansu, a brand of the Chongqing Bisu Automotive Corporation, which is closely related to Beiqi-Yinxiang, a joint venture between Beijing Auto (Beiqi) and the Yinxiang Group.

== Overview ==
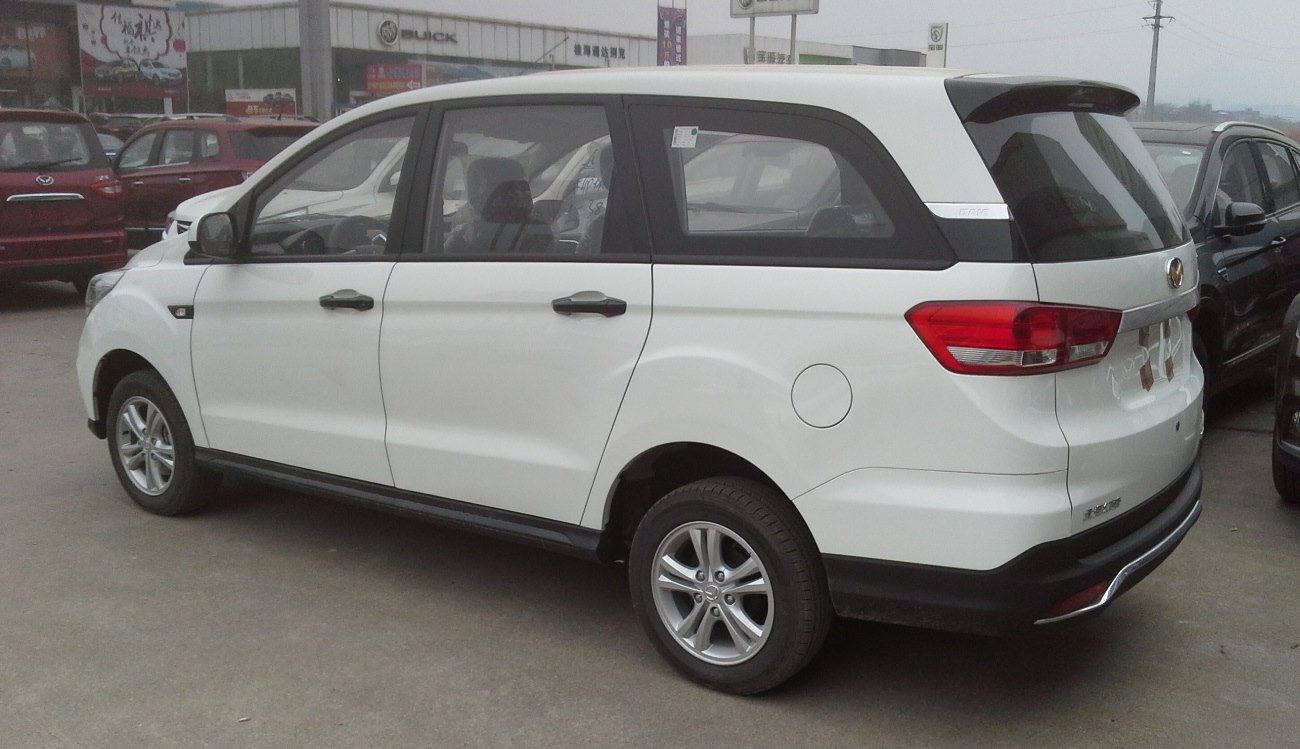
Huansu H3 rear

The Huansu H3 was officially launched during the 2015 Chengdu Auto Show in China, with prices ranging from 55,800 to 67,800 yuan at launch. The only engine at launch is a 1.5 liter engine with 84 kW (113 hp) and 150 N⋅m (111 lb⋅ft), mated to a five-speed manual gearbox with front-wheel-drive being the only powertrain option. A 1.8 liter engine with 100 kW (140 hp) and 180 N⋅m (133 lb⋅ft) mated to a 5-speed manual gearbox or a 5-speed automatic gearbox was added to the line-up later.

The Huansu H3 platform also underpins the later revealed Bisu M3.

== Huansu H3F ==
The Huansu H3F was officially launched in June 2016 with a price ranging from 58,800 yuan to 67,800 yuan. As the more upmarket trim of the Huansu H3, the Huansu H3F features the same 2-2-3 seating configuration and 1.5 liter engine powertrain while sporting a restyled front and rear end design. The only engine at launch is a 1.5 liter naturally aspirated engine with 85 kW (114 hp) and 150 N⋅m (111 lb⋅ft) mated to a 5-speed manual gearbox.

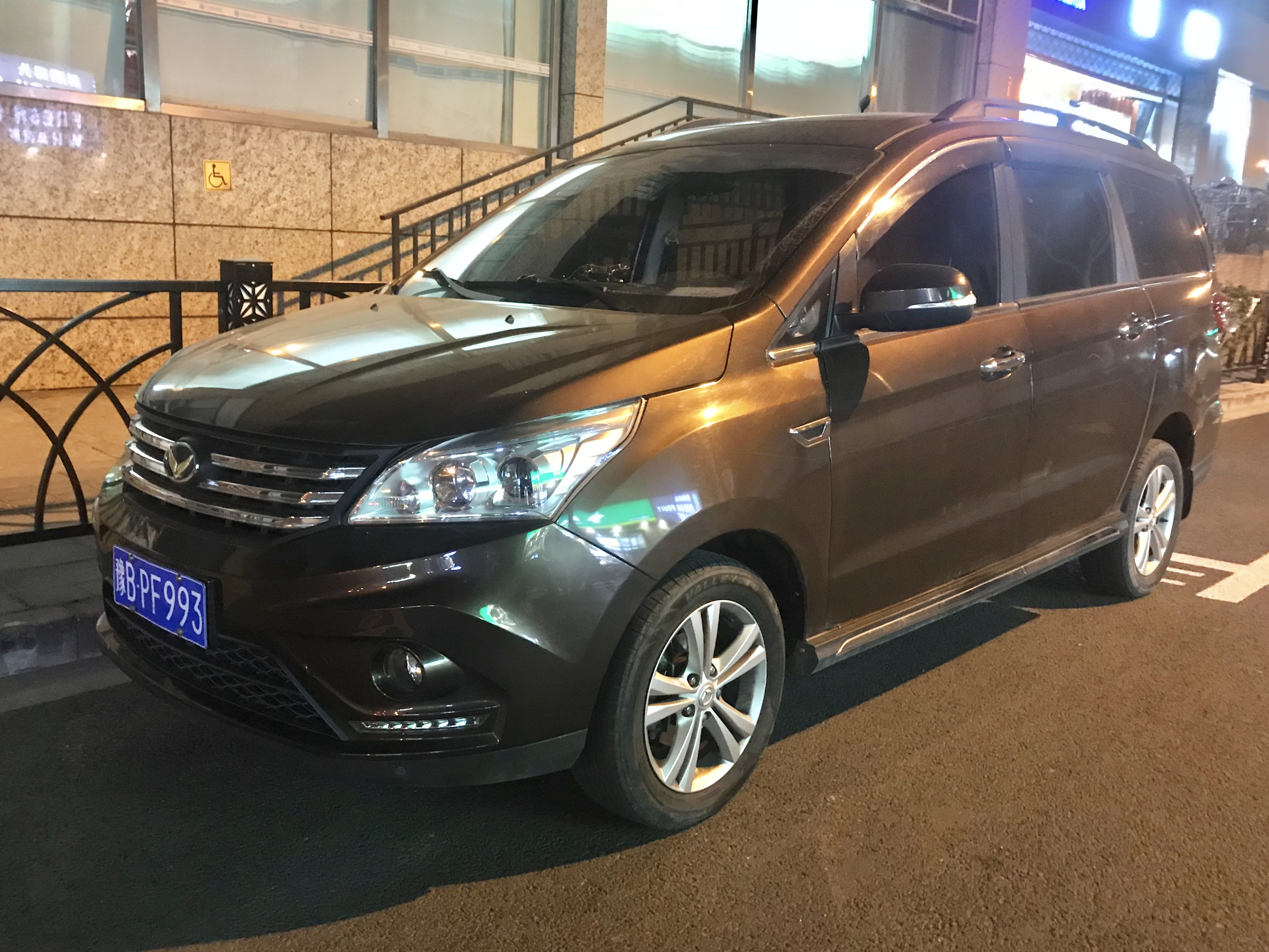
Huansu H3F

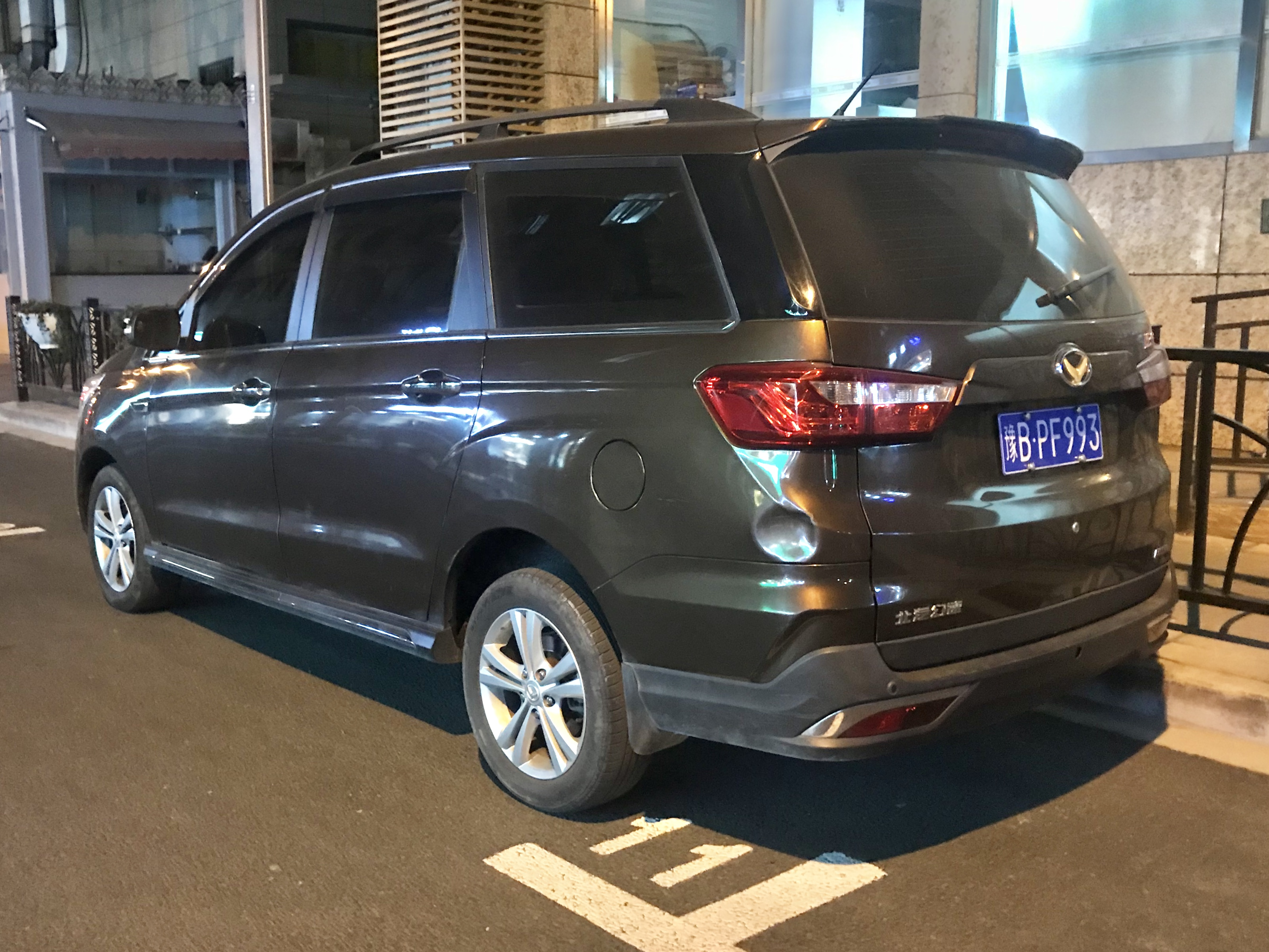
Huansu H3F rear
