= Bisu T5 =

Chinese CUV

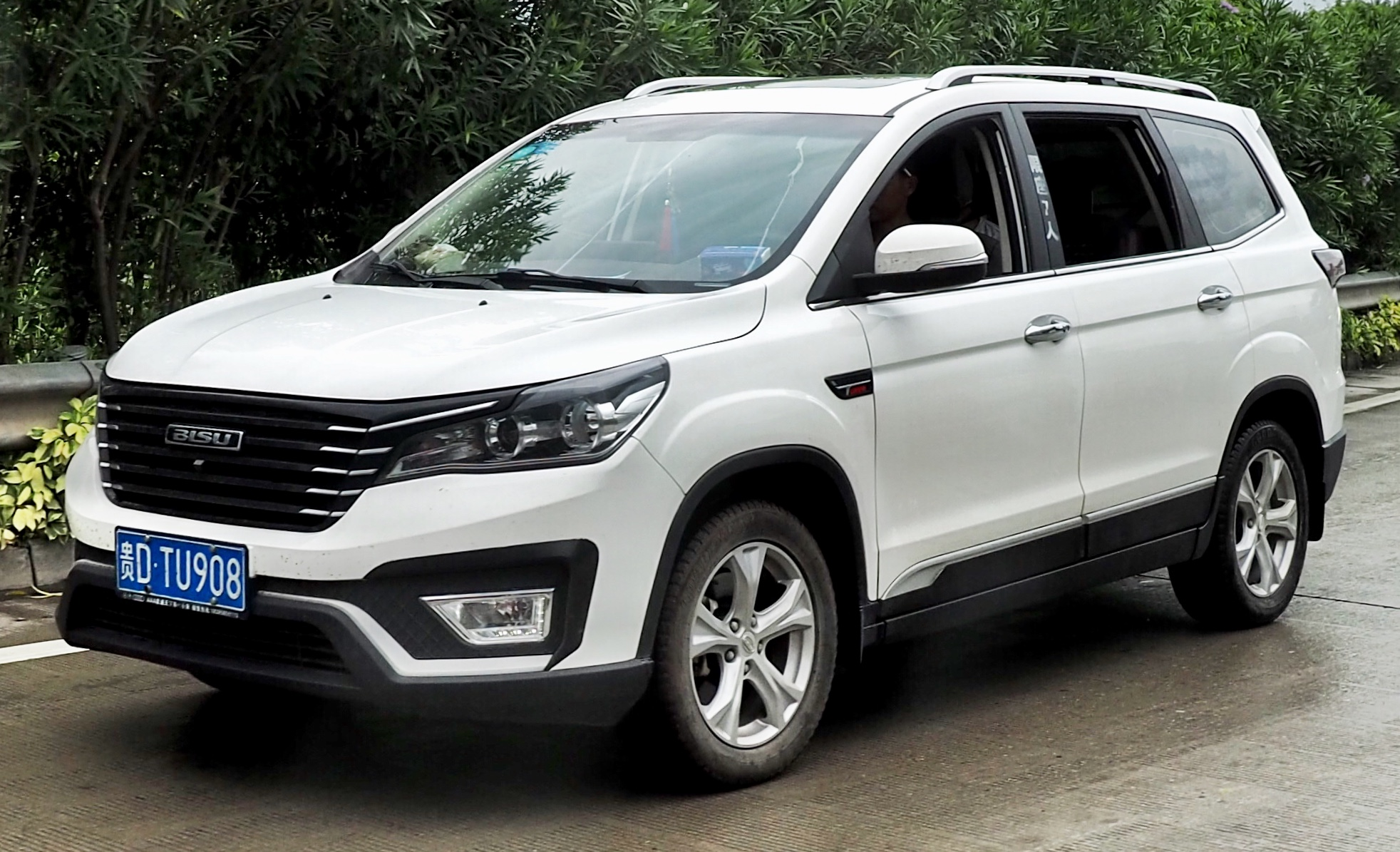
- Bisu T5 front

Overview
- Manufacturer: Bisu Auto
- Production: 2016–2020
- Model years: 2017–2020

Body and chassis
- Class: Mid-size CUV
- Body style: 5-door station wagon
- Layout: FF

Powertrain
- Engine: 1.5L I4 turbo
- Transmission: 6-speed manual; 8-speed semi-automatic

Dimensions
- Wheelbase: 2,760 mm (108.7 in)
- Length: 4,715 mm (185.6 in)
- Width: 1,830 mm (72.0 in)
- Height: 1,780 mm (70.1 in)
- Curb weight: 1,570–1,660 kg (3,461–3,660 lb)

The Bisu T5 is a 7-seat mid-size CUV produced by Bisu Auto, a brand of the Chongqing Bisu Automotive Corporation, which is closely related to Beiqi-Yinxiang, a joint venture between Beijing Auto (Beiqi) and the Yinxiang Group.

== Overview ==
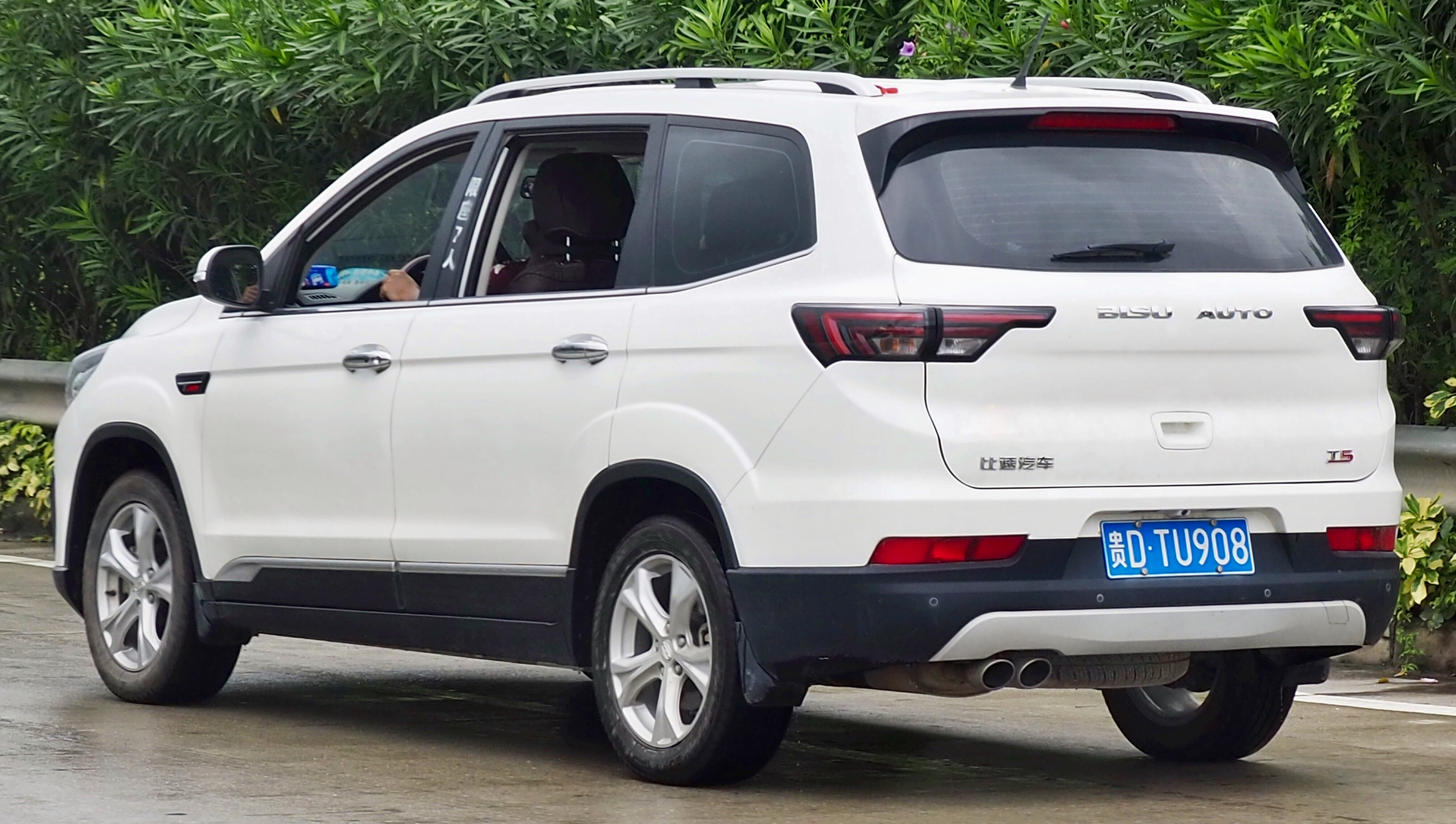
Bisu T5 rear

The Bisu T5 officially debuted during the 2017 Shanghai Auto Show as the third Bisu product following the Bisu M3 and the Bisu T3. The Bisu T5 shares the same platform as the Huansu H5, while the Bisu T5 is a 7-seater crossover MPV, the Huansu H5 is a 6-seater vehicle. Prices of the Bisu T5 ranges from 72,900 to 104,900 yuan at launch.

=== Powertrain ===
The power of the Bisu T5 comes from a turbocharged 1.5-liter engine with 110 kW (147 hp), mated to a six-speed manual transmission or a five-speed automatic transmission.

== Sales ==
Below is a table showing the sales data of the Bisu T5.

Bisu T5 Sales Data
| Year | Sales |
|---|---|
| 2017 | 24,946 |
| 2018 | 22,189 |
| 2019 | 3,622 |
| 2020 | 97 |
