= Bisu T3 =

Chinese Compact CUV

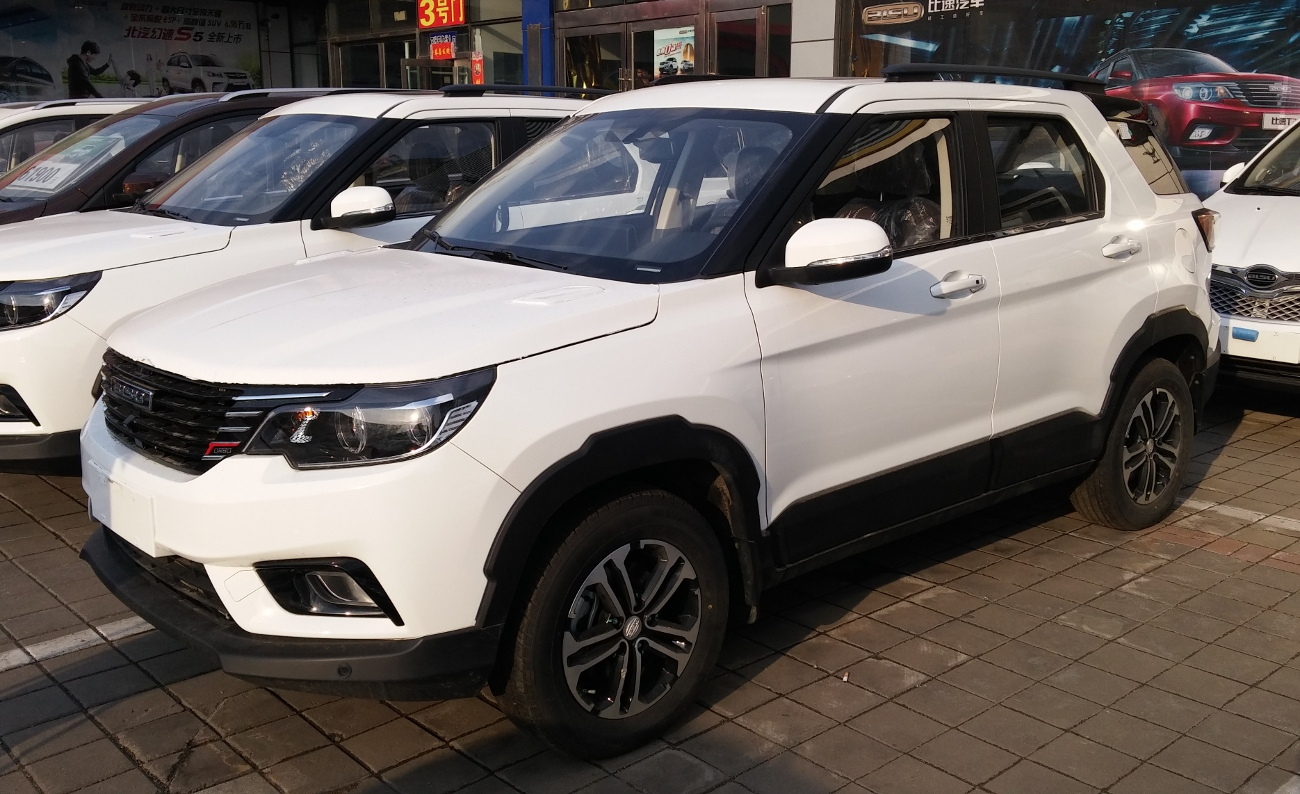

Overview
- Manufacturer: Bisu Auto
- Also called: Bisu S25
- Production: 2016–2020
- Model years: 2017–2020

Body and chassis
- Class: Compact crossover SUV
- Body style: 5-door SUV
- Layout: FF
- Related: Huansu S2; Huansu S3

Powertrain
- Engine: 1.3L I4 turbo
- Transmission: 5-speed manual; CVT

Dimensions
- Wheelbase: 2,565 mm (101.0 in)
- Length: 4,350 mm (171.3 in)
- Width: 1,825 mm (71.9 in)
- Height: 1,685 mm (66.3 in)
- Curb weight: 1,410–1,445 kg (3,109–3,186 lb)

The Bisu T3 is a compact crossover SUV produced by Bisu Auto, a brand of the Chongqing Bisu Automotive Corporation, which is closely related to Beiqi-Yinxiang, a joint venture between Beijing Auto (Beiqi) and the Yinxiang Group.

== Overview ==
The Bisu T3 was officially launched on the Chinese car market in Q1 2017 with prices ranging from 74,900 yuan to 89,900 yuan. The Bisu T3 was formerly known as the Bisu S25 during development phase, with the platform coming from the Beiqi-Yinxiang Huansu S2 and Huansu S3 CUVs.

=== Engine ===
The Bisu T3 has a 1.3L inline-four engine that produces 133 hp (99 kW) at 5500 rpm. Additionally, it produces 185 Nm of torque at 1500-4500 rpm. Its overall top speed is 178 km/h (111 mph).

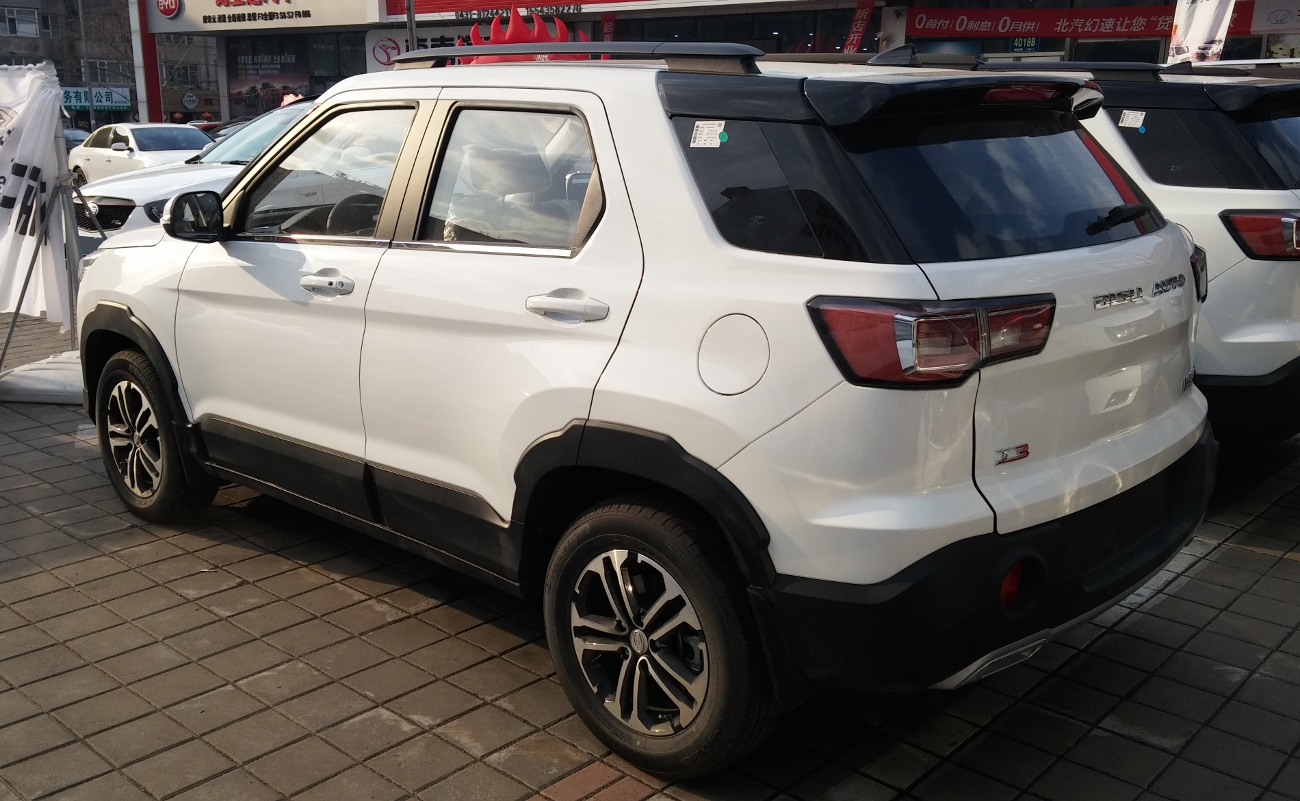
Bisu T3 rear
