= Huansu H5 =

Chinese multi purpose vehicle

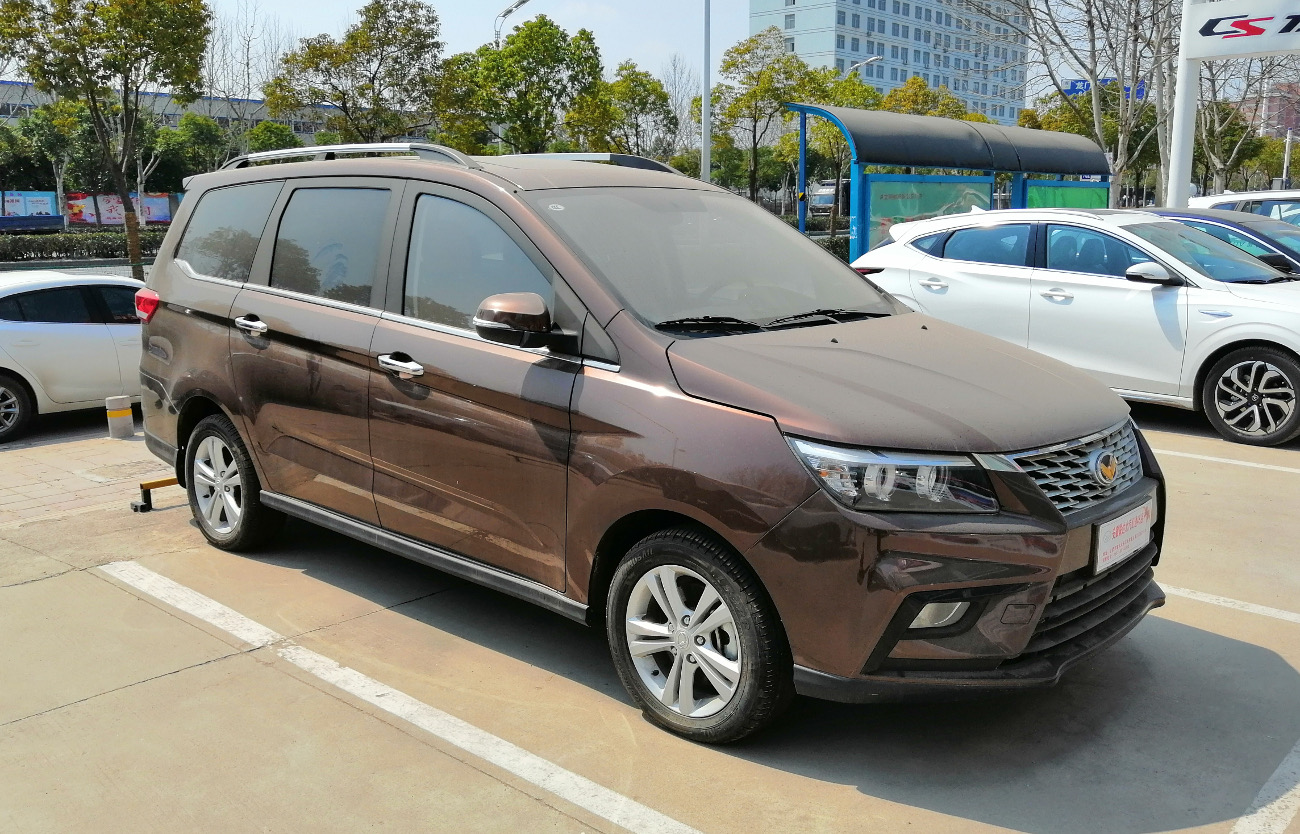

Overview
- Manufacturer: Huansu
- Production: 2017–2019

Body and chassis
- Class: MPV
- Body style: 5-door MPV
- Layout: FF

Powertrain
- Engine: 1.3L I4
- Transmission: 5-speed CVT

Dimensions
- Wheelbase: 2,760 mm (108.7 in)
- Length: 4,750 mm (187.0 in)
- Width: 1,800 mm (70.9 in)
- Height: 1,800 mm (70.9 in)
- Curb weight: 1,620 kg (3,571 lb)

The Huansu H5 is a MPV produced by Huansu, a brand of the Chongqing Bisu Automotive Corporation, which is closely related to Beiqi-Yinxiang, a joint venture between Beijing Auto (Beiqi) and the Yinxiang Group.

== Overview ==
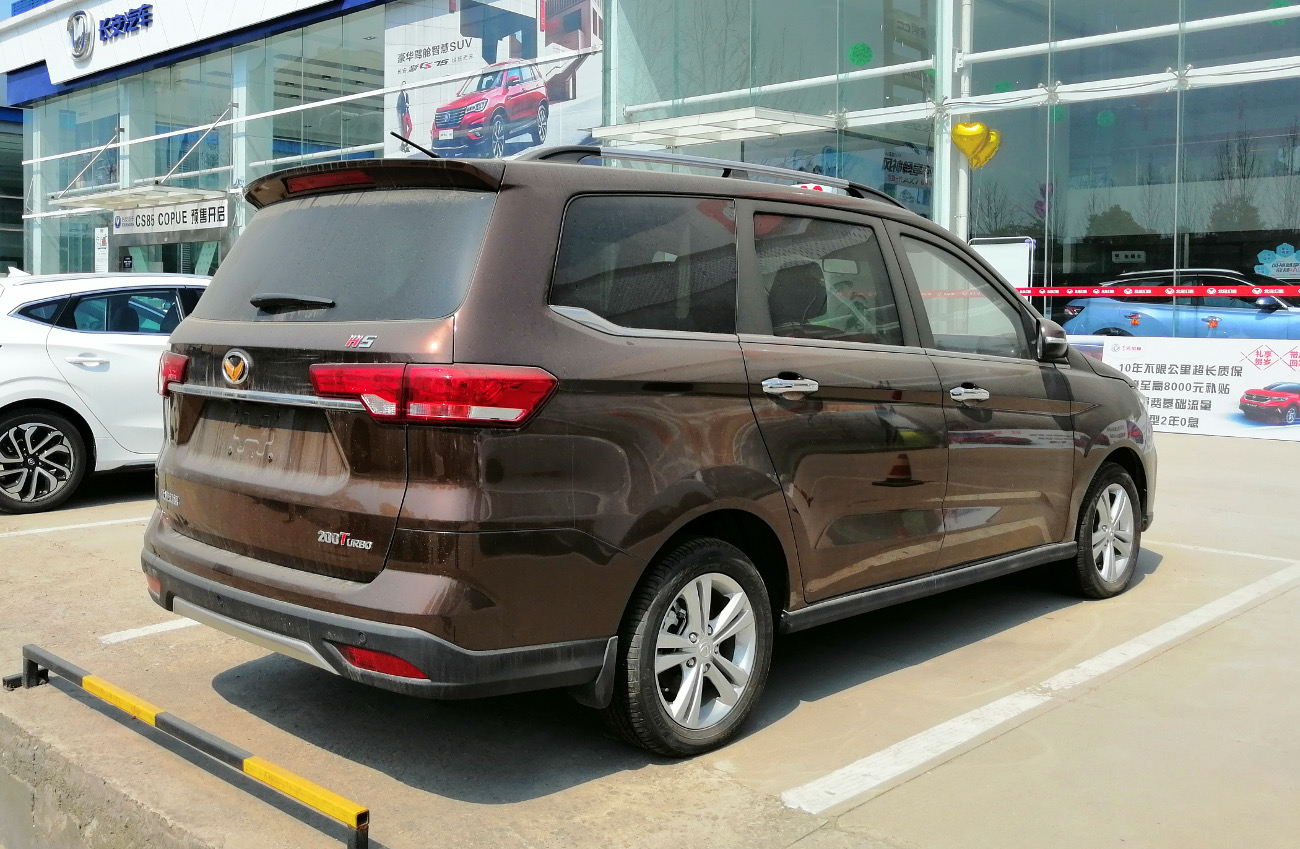
Huansu H5 rear

The Huansu H5 was launched in 2017, and rides on the same platform as the Bisu T5. The Huansu H5 is a 6-seater vehicle with a wheelbase of 2760 mm. The vehicle is 4750 mm long, 1800 mm wide and also 1800 mm high. The curb weight is 1620 kg.

=== Powertrain ===
The Huansu H5 is powered by a four-cylinder gasoline engine with four-valve technology. With the help of a turbocharger, it produces 98 kW from a displacement of 1298 cm^{3}. The engine is mated to a CVT (continuously variable transmission).

== Sales ==
The first Huansu H5 was registered in China in September 2017. In 2017, there were 2132 H5s sold. In the two following years, there were 1382 and 399. The last units were handed down in July 2019.
