= Huansu S3 =

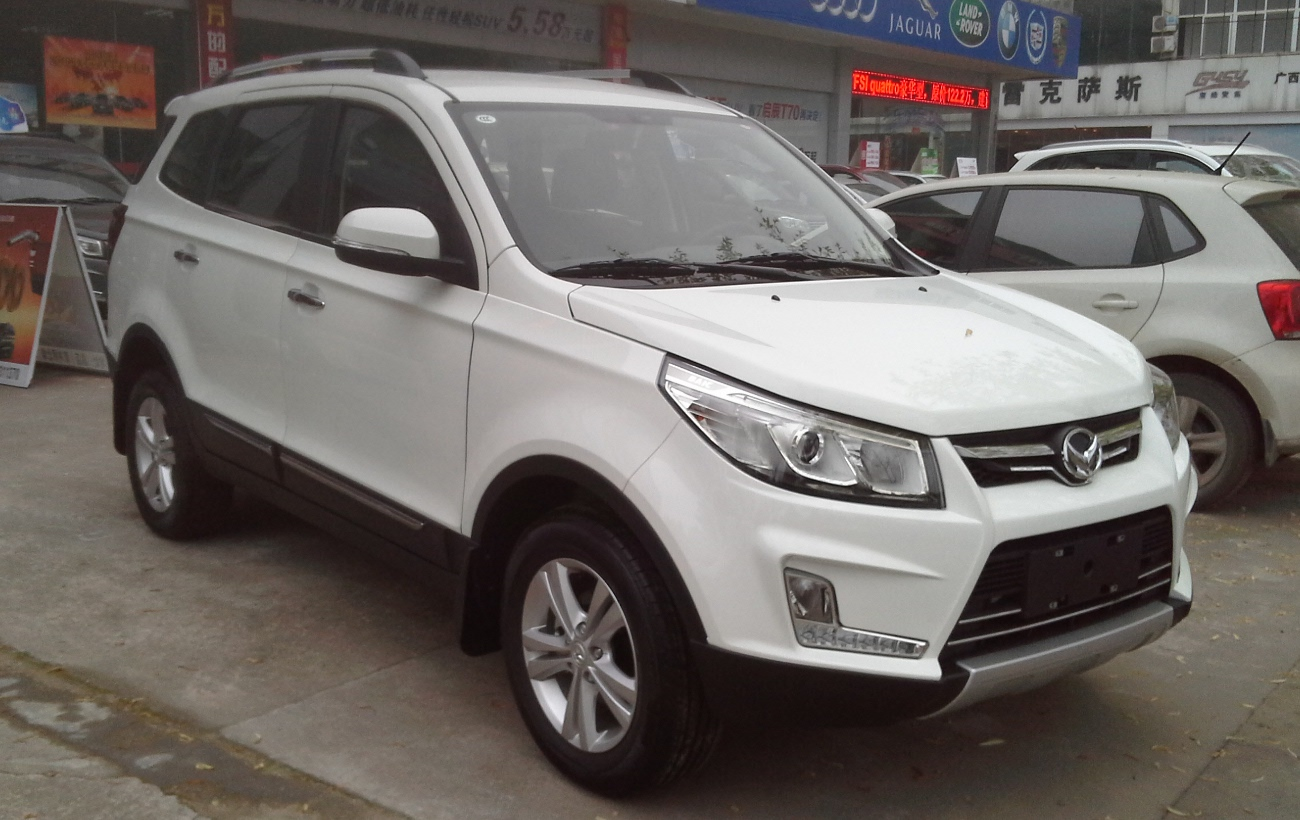

Overview
- Manufacturer: Huansu-BAIC Group
- Also called: Ruixiang X3; Max Motor Tiam (Iran)
- Production: 2014–2020
- Model years: 2014–2020

Body and chassis
- Class: Compact SUV
- Body style: 5-door SUV
- Layout: FR
- Related: Huansu S2

Powertrain
- Engine: 1.5L I4; 1.8L I4
- Transmission: 5-speed manual

Dimensions
- Wheelbase: 2,685 mm (105.7 in); 2,700 mm (106.3 in) (S3L)
- Length: 4,240 mm (166.9 in); 4,380 mm (172.4 in) (S3L)
- Width: 1,730 mm (68.1 in)
- Height: 1,760 mm (69.3 in)
- Curb weight: 1,335–1,435 kg (2,943–3,164 lb)

The Huansu S3 is a 7-seat compact SUV produced by Huansu, a sub-brand of BAIC Motor.

== Overview ==
The Huansu S3 is the 7-seat variant of the Huansu S2 5-seat compact SUV, both manufactured by Beiqi Yinxiang Automobile. It debuted at the 2014 Beijing Auto Show. The Huansu S3 is powered by a 1.5-liter inline-four engine producing 84 kW (113 hp), with the engine mated to a 5-speed manual gearbox.

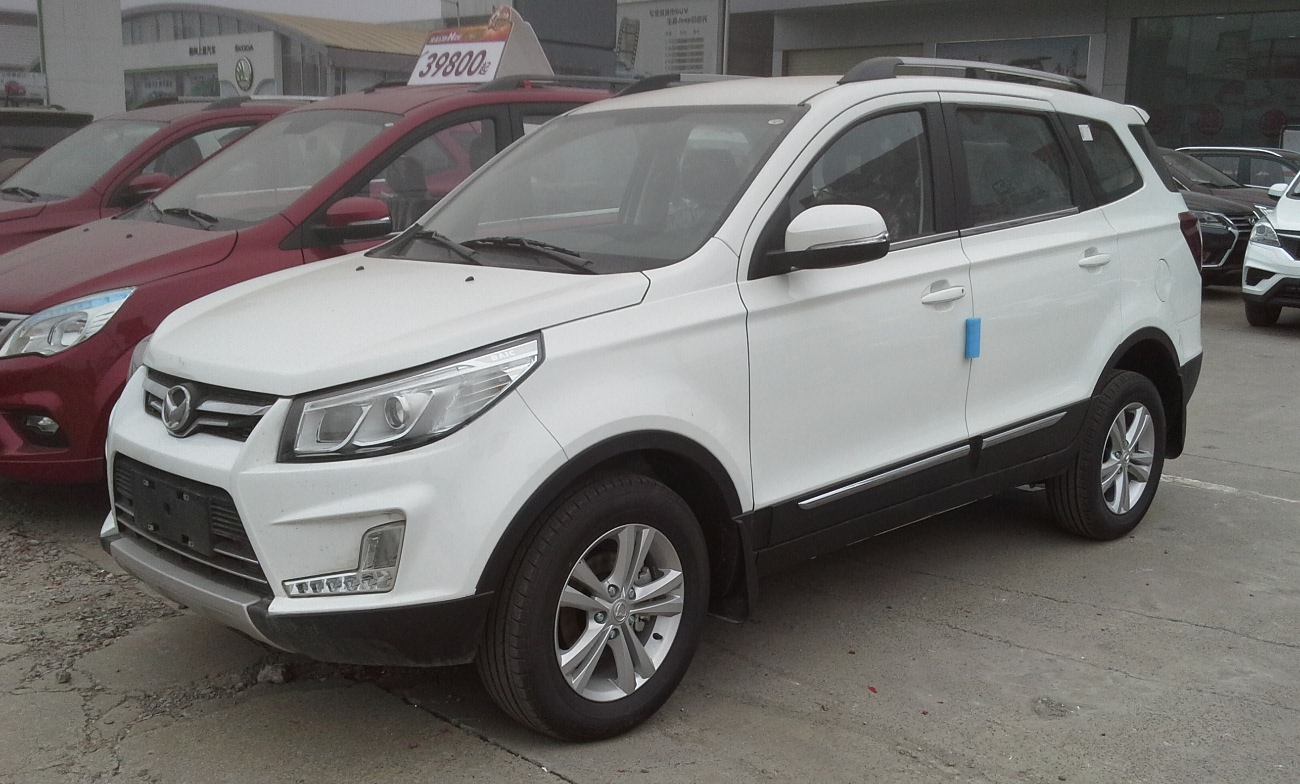
Huansu S3 (front)

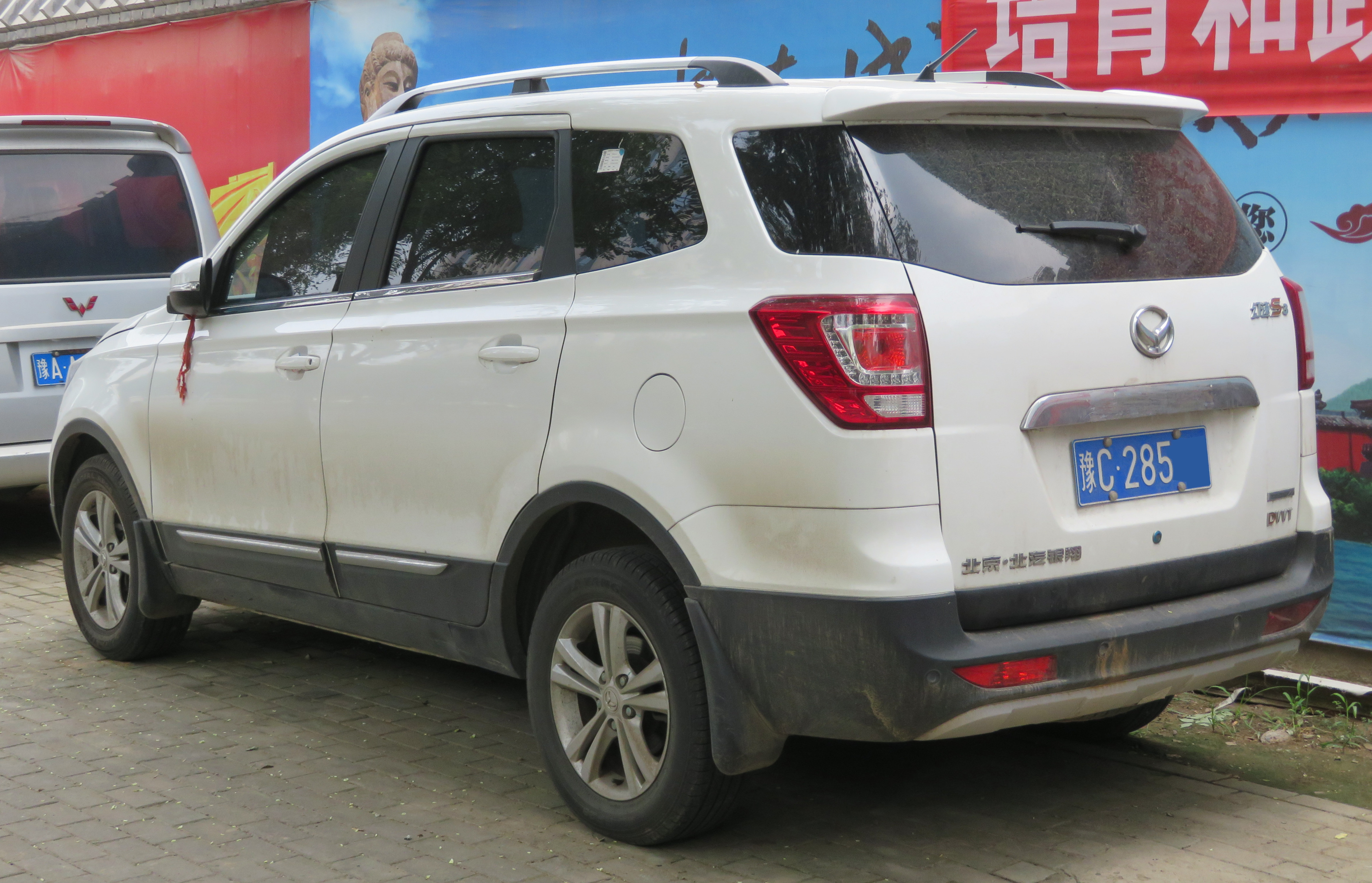
Huansu S3 (rear)

== Huansu S3L ==
The Huansu S3L is essentially the longer version of the regular Huansu S3, featuring a restyled front and rear end and a longer side DLO. The Huansu S3L has a length of 4,380 mm (172 in) and a wheelbase of 2,700 mm (110 in) which is longer than the Huansu S3 by 140 mm (5.5 in) with a wheelbase that is 15 mm (0.59 in) longer than the Huansu S3.

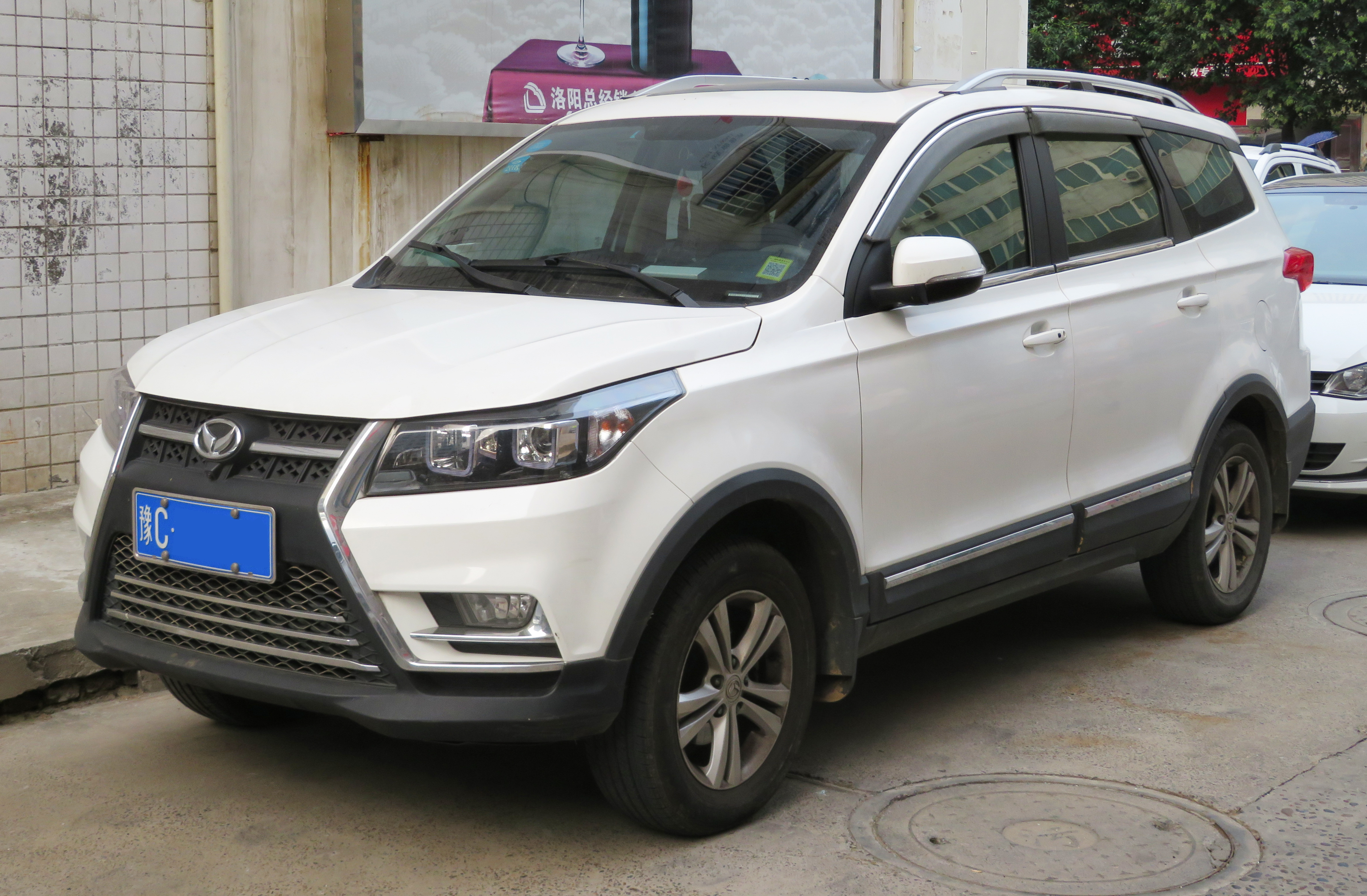
Huansu S3L (front)

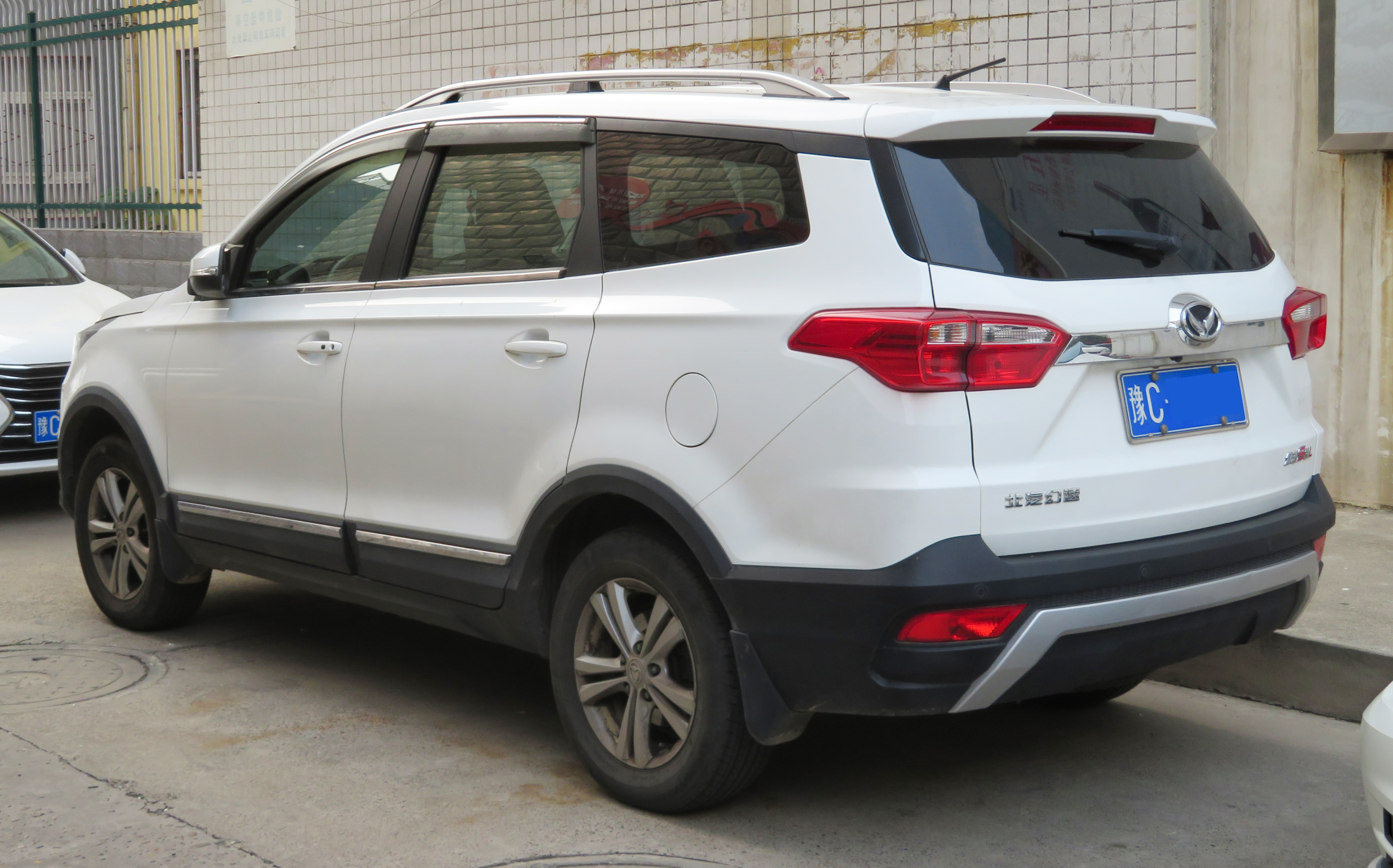
Huansu S3L (rear)

== Ruixiang X3 ==
The Ruixiang X3 is the second vehicle of the Ruixiang brand and it is a rebadge based on the Huansu S3L crossover with a redesigned front end. The Ruixiang X3 is powered by a 1.5-liter naturally aspirated engine producing 77 kW mated to a 5-speed manual transmission.

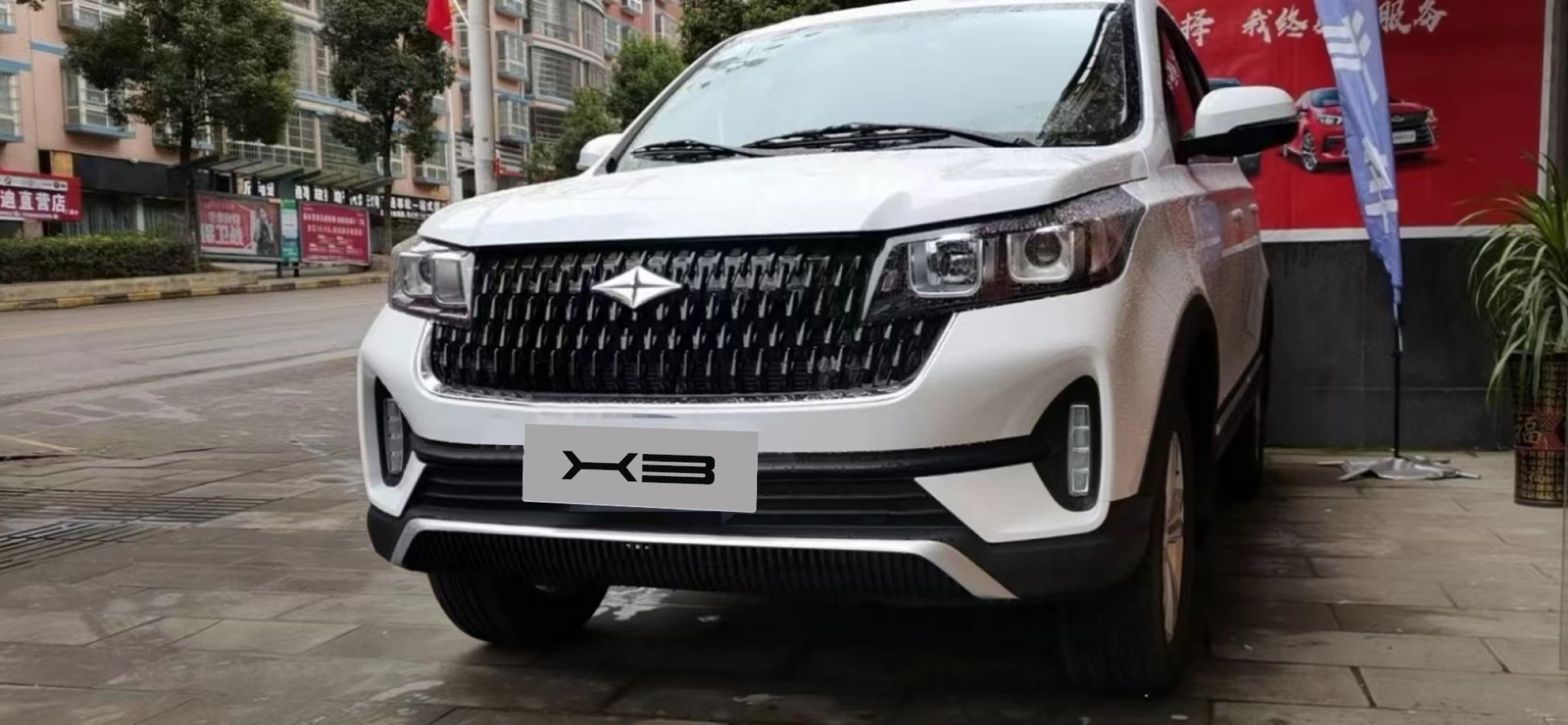
Ruixiang X3
