= Huansu S2 =

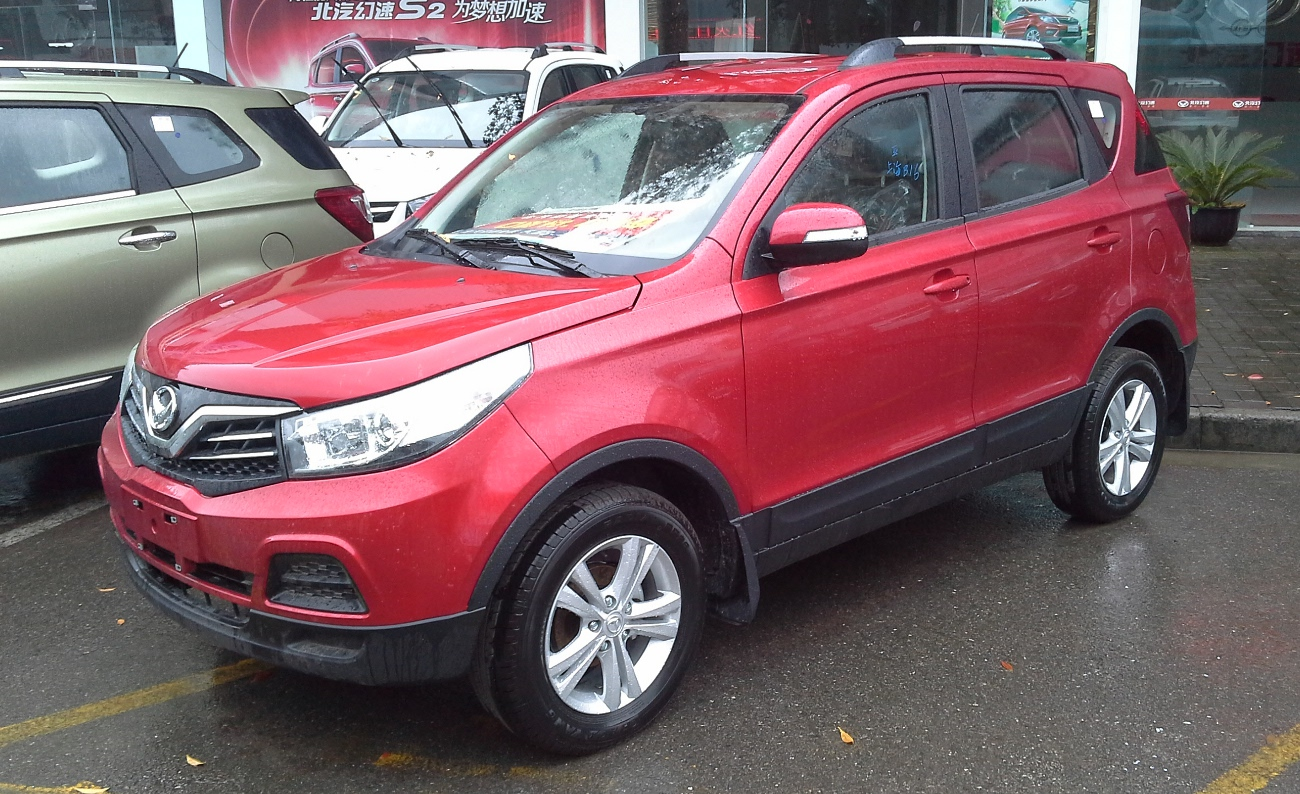

Overview
- Manufacturer: Huansu-BAIC Group
- Production: 2014–2020
- Model years: 2014–2020

Body and chassis
- Class: Compact SUV
- Body style: 5-door hatchback
- Layout: FR
- Related: Huansu S3

Powertrain
- Engine: 1.5 L I4; 1.8 L I4
- Transmission: 5-speed manual

Dimensions
- Wheelbase: 2,560 mm (100.8 in)
- Length: 4,250 mm (167.3 in)
- Width: 1,730 mm (68.1 in)
- Height: 1,735 mm (68.3 in)
- Curb weight: 1,220 kg (2,690 lb)

The Huansu S2 is a 5-seat compact SUV produced by Huansu, a sub-brand of BAIC Motor.

== Overview ==
The Huansu S2 is a 5-seat variant of the Huansu S3 7-seat compact SUV. Both are manufactured by Beiqi Yinxiang Automobile, a joint venture between Beijing Auto (Beiqi) and the Yinxiang Motorcycle Group. It debuted at the 2014 Beijing Auto Show.

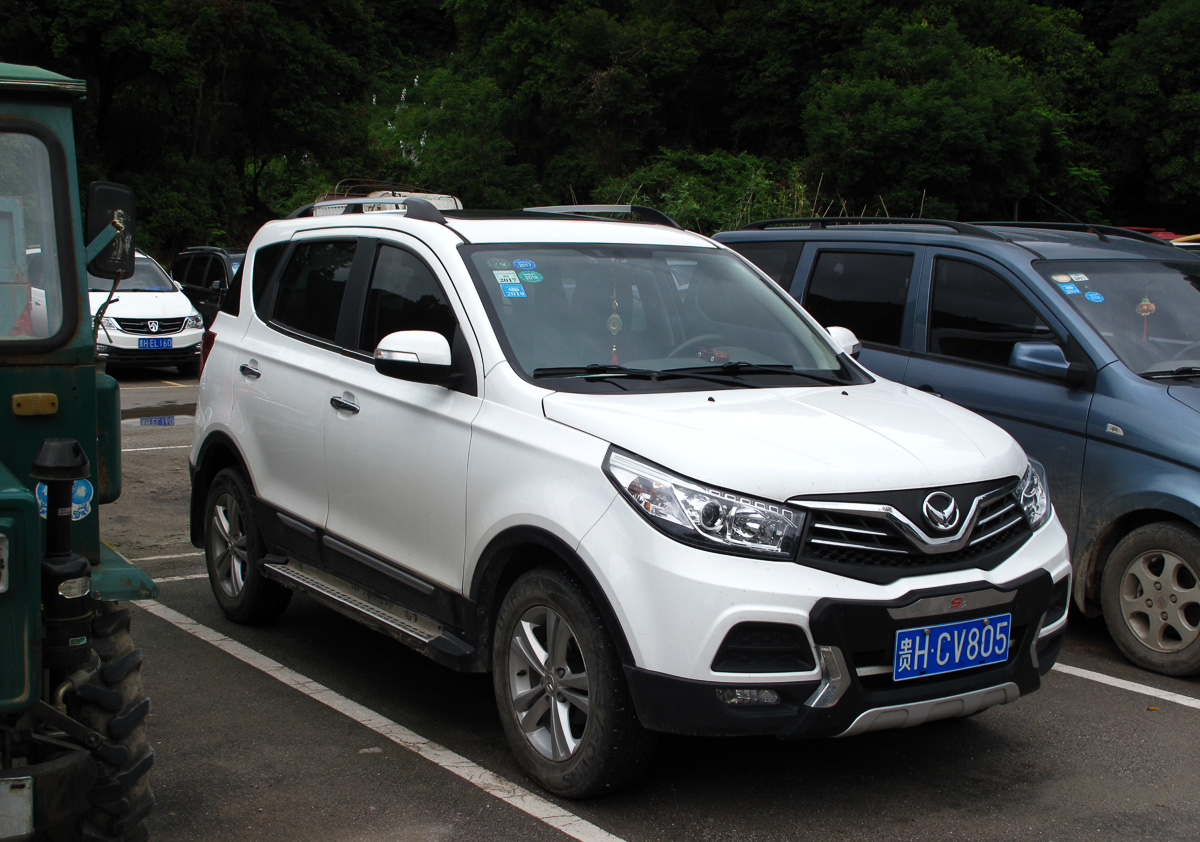
Huansu S2 pre-facelift front

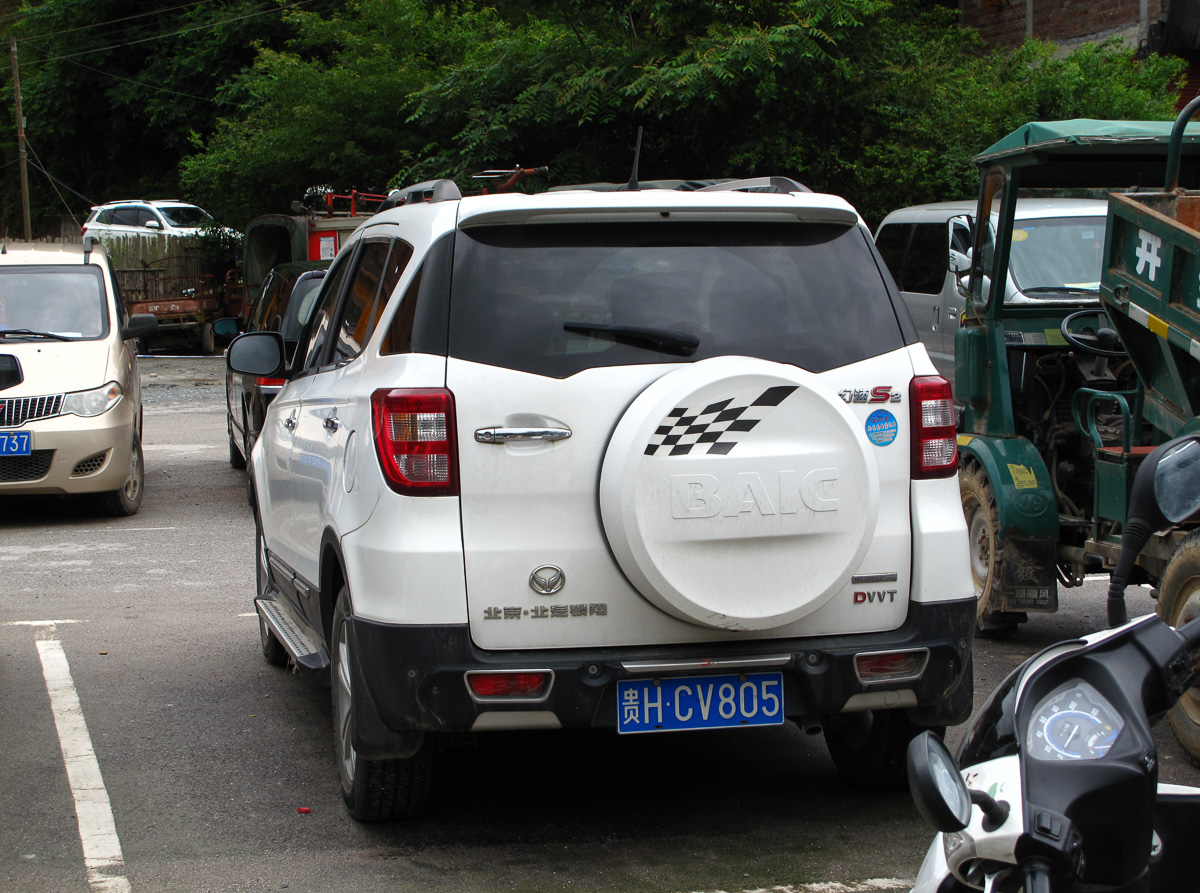
Huansu S2 pre-facelift rear

=== Powertrain ===
The Huansu S2 is powered by a 1.5-liter engine developing 84 kW (113 hp) mated to a 5-speed manual transmission. A 1.8-liter four-cylinder engine with 103 kW (138 hp) and 180 N⋅m (133 lb⋅ft) originally only available for the Huansu S3 was added later.

=== 2015 facelift ===
The Huansu S2 received a facelift for the 2015 model year changing the front fascia design to be more inline with the rest of the Huansu lineup.

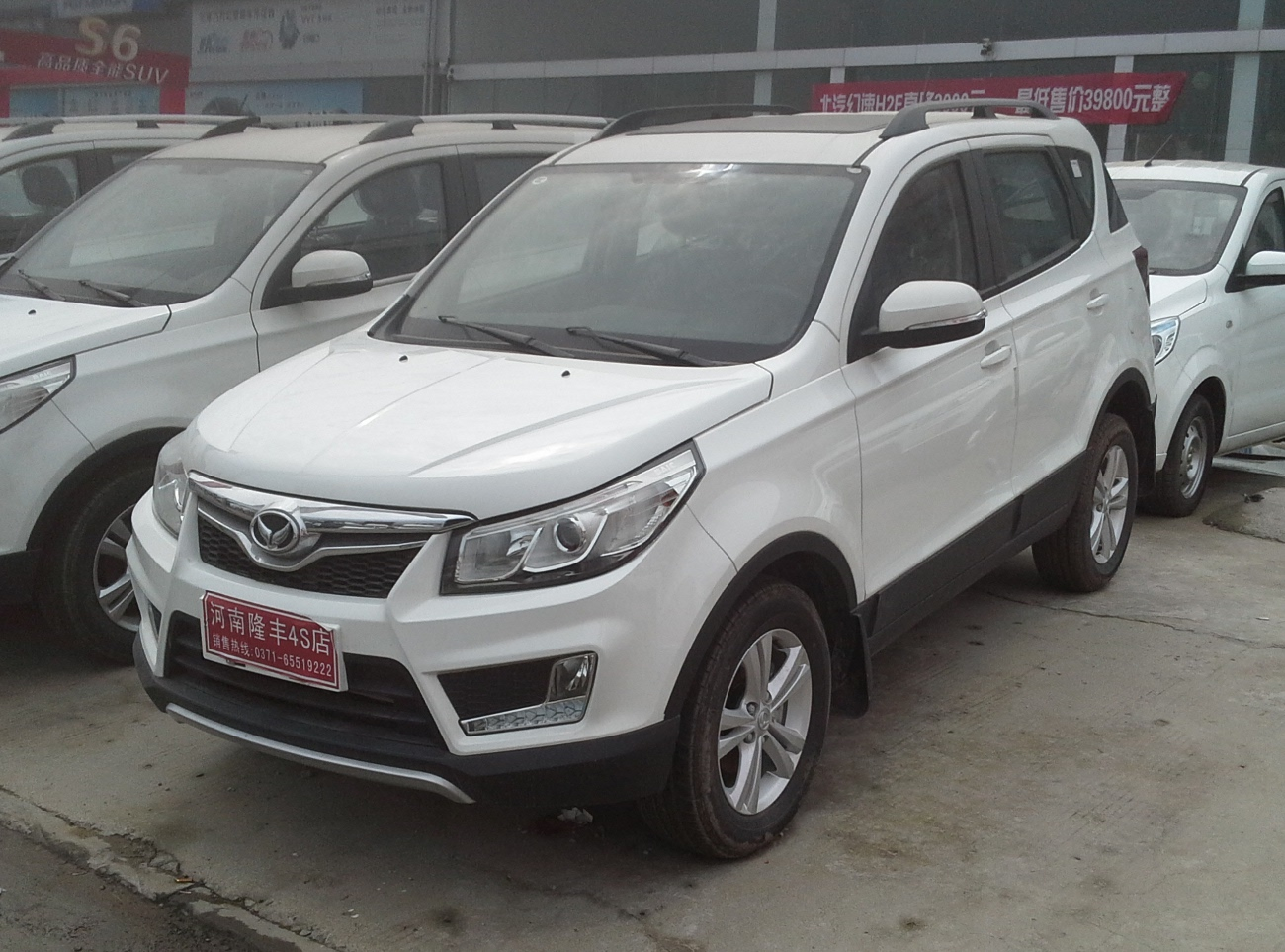
Huansu S2 facelift front
