= Suzuki Cultus =

Supermini car

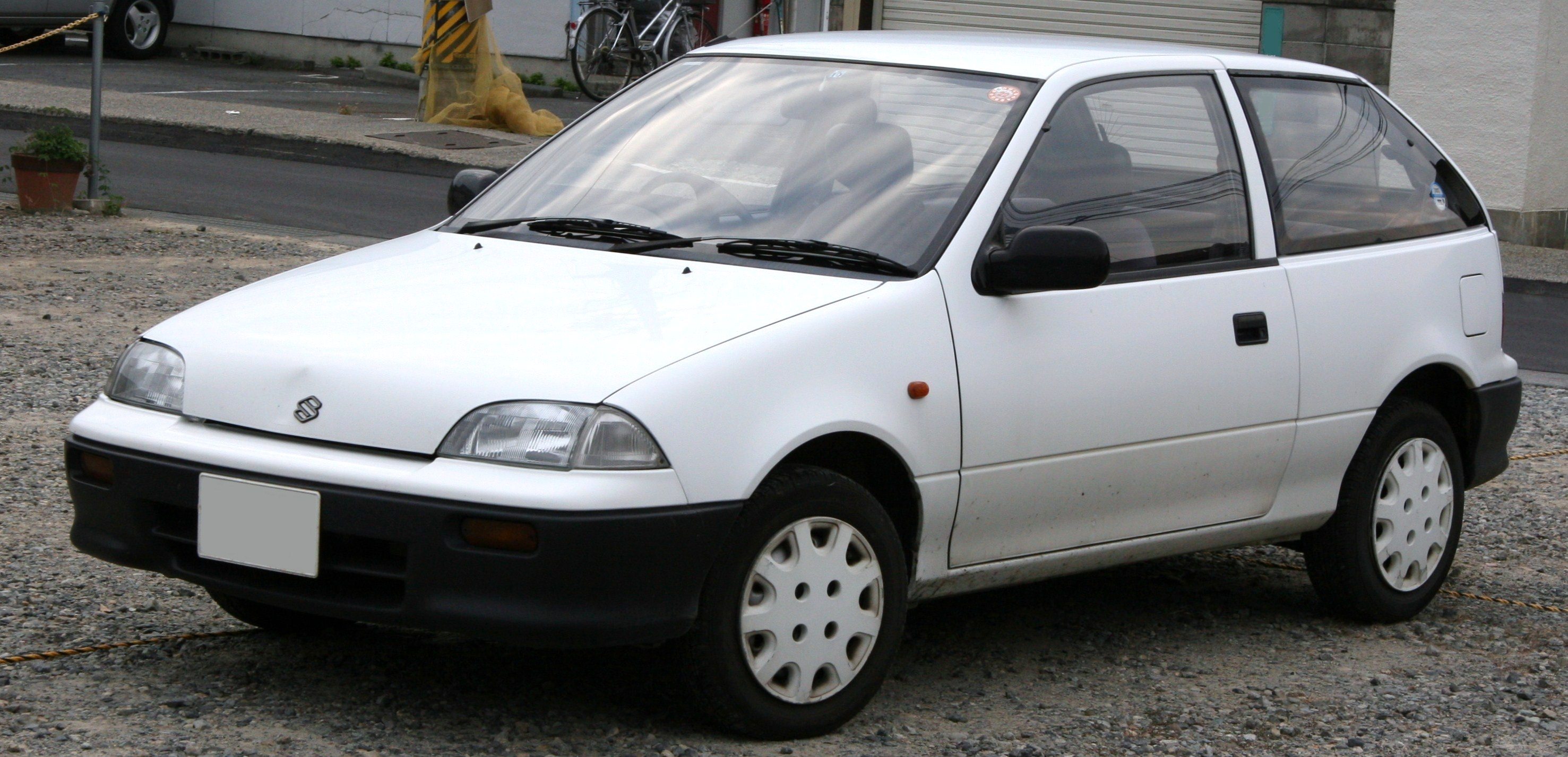
- Suzuki Cultus 1.0 3-door (Japan)

Overview
- Manufacturer: Suzuki
- Production: 1983–2016

Body and chassis
- Class: Supermini
- Platform: GM M platform

Chronology
- Successor: Suzuki Cultus Crescent/Baleno (sedan, Japan/global); Suzuki Swift (global); Suzuki Celerio (Pakistan); Maruti Suzuki Dzire (sedan, India); Geo Metro/Suzuki Swift (Canada and United States); Pontiac Firefly (Canada); Holden Barina (Australia); Subaru Justy (Europe)

The Suzuki Cultus is a supermini car produced by the Japanese manufacturer Suzuki from 1983 to 2016. The nameplate is currently used as a rebadged second-generation Suzuki Celerio in Pakistan since 2017. It was first presented at the 25th Tokyo Motor Show, formally introduced to Japan in 1983 and ultimately sold in seven countries and marketed worldwide as the Suzuki Swift. An alliance formed in 1981 between General Motors, Suzuki and Isuzu allowed GM to market the Cultus as a captive import internationally under more than a dozen nameplates including the Geo Metro, Chevrolet Sprint, Pontiac Firefly, Isuzu Geminett, Margalla and Holden Barina. It was also known as the M-car within GM.

Offered across its lifespan in four body-style variations with engines from the Suzuki G engine family, the second generation Cultus still remained in production in Pakistan until late 2016. The Cultus family of vehicles has been marketed in Asia, Australia, Europe, North America and South America.

The name cultus is Latin, meaning "care" or "adoration".

== First generation (1983) ==
First generation (SA)
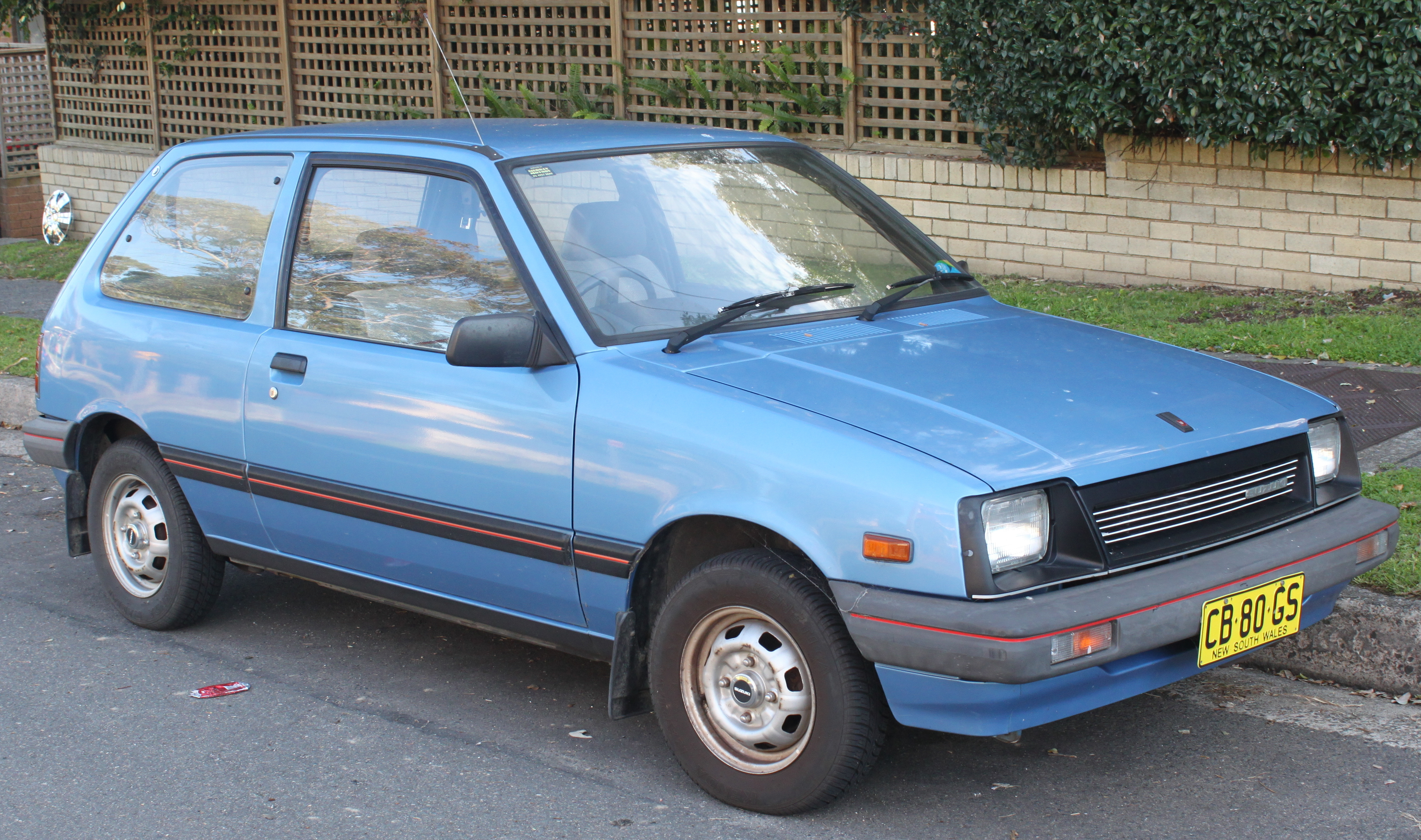
- Suzuki Swift GL three-door (pre-facelift, Australia)

Overview
- Also called: Suzuki SA310/SA413; Suzuki Swift; Suzuki Khyber (Pakistan); Suzuki Forsa (Indonesia, United States, Canada, Ecuador and Chile); Suzuki Extra (Finland); Holden Barina; Chevrolet Sprint/Sprint Metro; Pontiac Firefly (Canada); Isuzu Geminett (Japan)
- Production: 1983–1988 (Japan); 1985–1991 (Canada); 1985–1990 (Indonesia); 1985–1988 (New Zealand); 1986–2004 (Colombia); 1989–2000 (Pakistan)
- Assembly: Japan: Kosai; Colombia: Bogotá (GM Colmotores; Ecuador: Quito (Aymesa); Kenya: Nairobi; Indonesia: Pulo Gadung, East Jakarta (PT. Indomobil Utama); Malaysia: Pekan (DRB-HICOM); New Zealand: Trentham (GMNZ); Pakistan: Karachi (Pak Suzuki Motors)

Body and chassis
- Body style: 3/5-door hatchback
- Layout: Transverse front-engine, front-wheel-drive

Powertrain
- Engine: 970 cc F10A I4 (Indonesia); 993 cc G10 I3; 993 cc G10T turbo I3; 1,298 cc G13B 16V DOHC I4; 1,324 cc G13A I4
- Transmission: 4/5-speed manual; 3-speed automatic

Dimensions
- Wheelbase: 3-door: 2,245 mm (88.4 in); 5-door: 2,345 mm (92.3 in)
- Length: 3-door: *3,585 mm (141.1 in) (pre-facelift); *3,670 mm (144.5 in) (facelift); 5-door: *3,685 mm (145.1 in) (pre-facelift); *3,770 mm (148.4 in) (facelift)
- Width: 1,530–1,545 mm (60.2–60.8 in)
- Height: 1,350 mm (53.1 in)
- Curb weight: 620–750 kg (1,367–1,653 lb)

The first generation was a project begun by General Motors as the M-car. When they realized that the project was not going to be profitable enough, the entire unfinished design was sold to Suzuki in return for a five per cent stake in the company. Suzuki completed the design and development work and put the car on sale from October 1983 in the Japanese market, as the Cultus. This is also why the car's design was such a natural fit in the General Motors lineup, with a clear GM corporate look. The model was also exported worldwide by Suzuki and assembled by a number of General Motors franchises, often undergoing badge engineering. The first-generation Swifts all share the SA model code prefix and was Suzuki's first earnest entry into a class of car with larger dimensions and engines than of the kei class Suzuki Fronte. Three- and four-cylinder versions of the G engine family were available, although some secondary markets installed Suzuki's one-liter four-cylinder F10A engine in a model which carries the SA410 chassis code.

=== Original model (1983) ===
Early export models were sold simply by the model code, SA310. Not long after introduction, the car was given a variety of different names depending on the market, most commonly Swift. In Japan the car was always known as the Cultus. The SA310 initially featured leaf spring rear suspension and was originally marketed with a 1.0-liter (993 cc), three-cylinder engine (G10). The SA310 had its European premier in southern Spain in late 1983. The original model was available as the base GA, the GL, and the more expensive GLX models. Only three-door versions were available for the first few years. Early models were sold in Finland as the Suzuki Extra.

The 1.0-liter turbo (G10T) and a three-speed automatic transmission were introduced in Japan on the last day of May 1984. The turbo raised the power to 80 PS (79 hp; 59 kW) (JIS) and it received 165/70 HR12 tyres. In August 1984, the 10 cm (4 in) longer five-door body was introduced, as was the 1.3-liter (1,324 cc) four-cylinder version (SA413). There was also a sporting European three-door version called Swift GS, fitted with a 1.3-liter engine (G13A), which received two-tone bodywork and a somewhat more powerful engine than the standard 1.3-liter models (67 PS (66 hp; 49 kW) vs 73 PS (72 hp; 54 kW) (DIN)). The GS also featured flush headlights, yellow filtered front foglamps with black removable covers and white wheel trims. The interior was finished in a grey fabric with two broad red strips over the front and rear seats, also new sporty three-spoke steering wheel. The introduction of the 1985 model year versions also marked the introduction of the "Swift" name in the European market, as earlier models had been sold simply as the SA310.

Two headlight variations existed within the earlier models depending on market and level. The lower equipped were fitted with a recessed sealed beam rectangular light while others came with a panel-flush forwards swept glass unit. The drag coefficient value of an early model is Cd=0.38.

Before it entered the Australian market as the Barina in 1985, the local Suzuki importer sold it as a two-seat van with the "Swift" moniker, as they did not have the necessary quota allocation to bring it in as a passenger car. In New Zealand, the Swift was assembled locally in Wanganui by Suzuki beginning in 1985 and developed its own niche in the market, selling about 800 cars per year. The Holden Barina was also assembled in New Zealand, but by GMNZ in their Petone plant. While originally sold as the three-cylinder, three-door "Swift" in Indonesia, a five-door model of the pre-facelift SA310 was briefly offered beginning in late 1985. It was replaced by another five-door model fitted with the locally built (by "Suzuki Engine Manufacturing Indonesia") four-cylinder, 970 cc F10A engine from the popular Suzuki Carry 1.0 and 55 PS (54 hp; 40 kW) (SAE), entered production in Indonesia in early 1986 as the "Forsa". The imported three-door model was discontinued, while the more upscale Forsa also benefitted from the new flush headlamps.

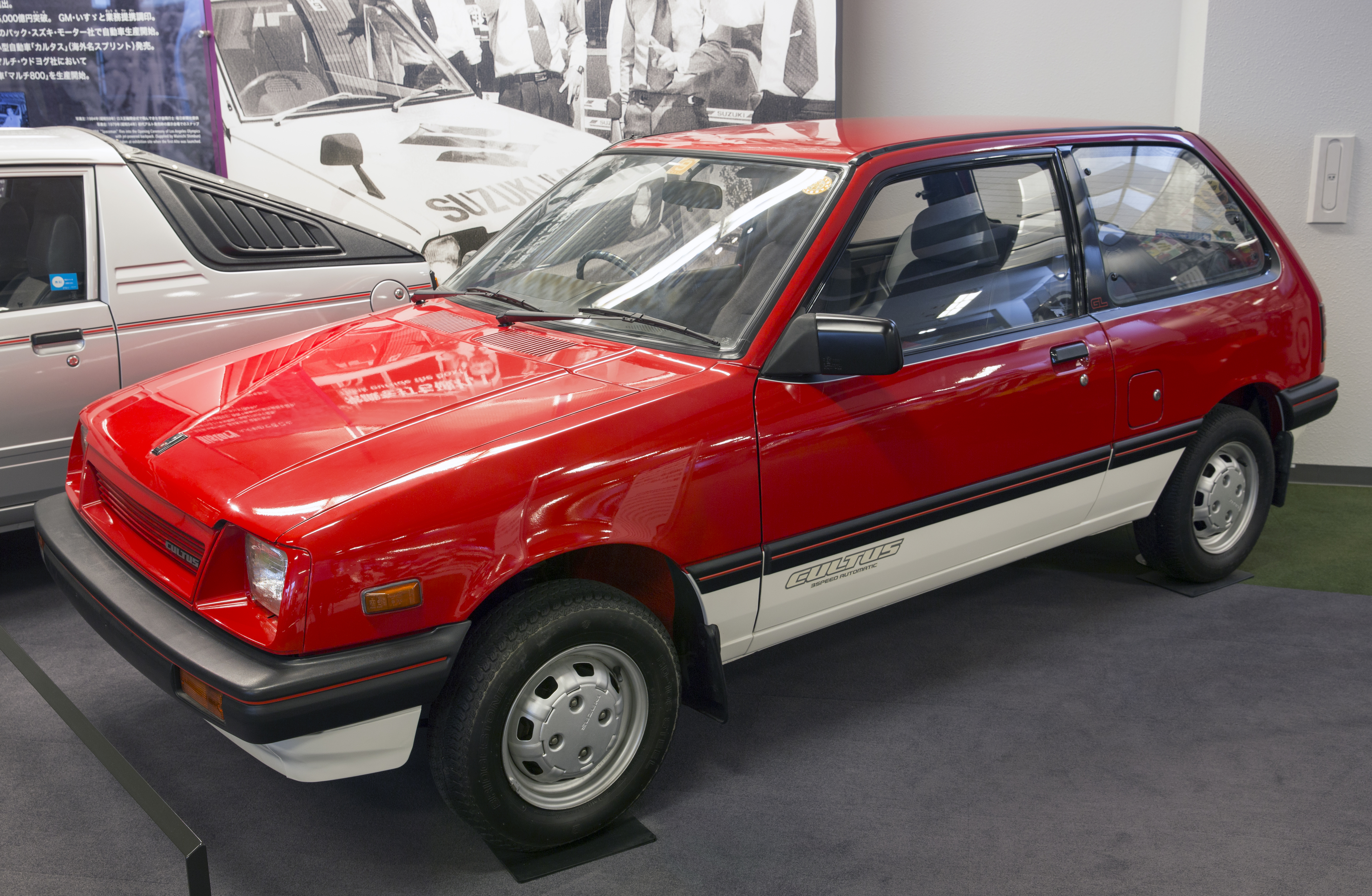
Early Suzuki Cultus with recessed lights (Japan)

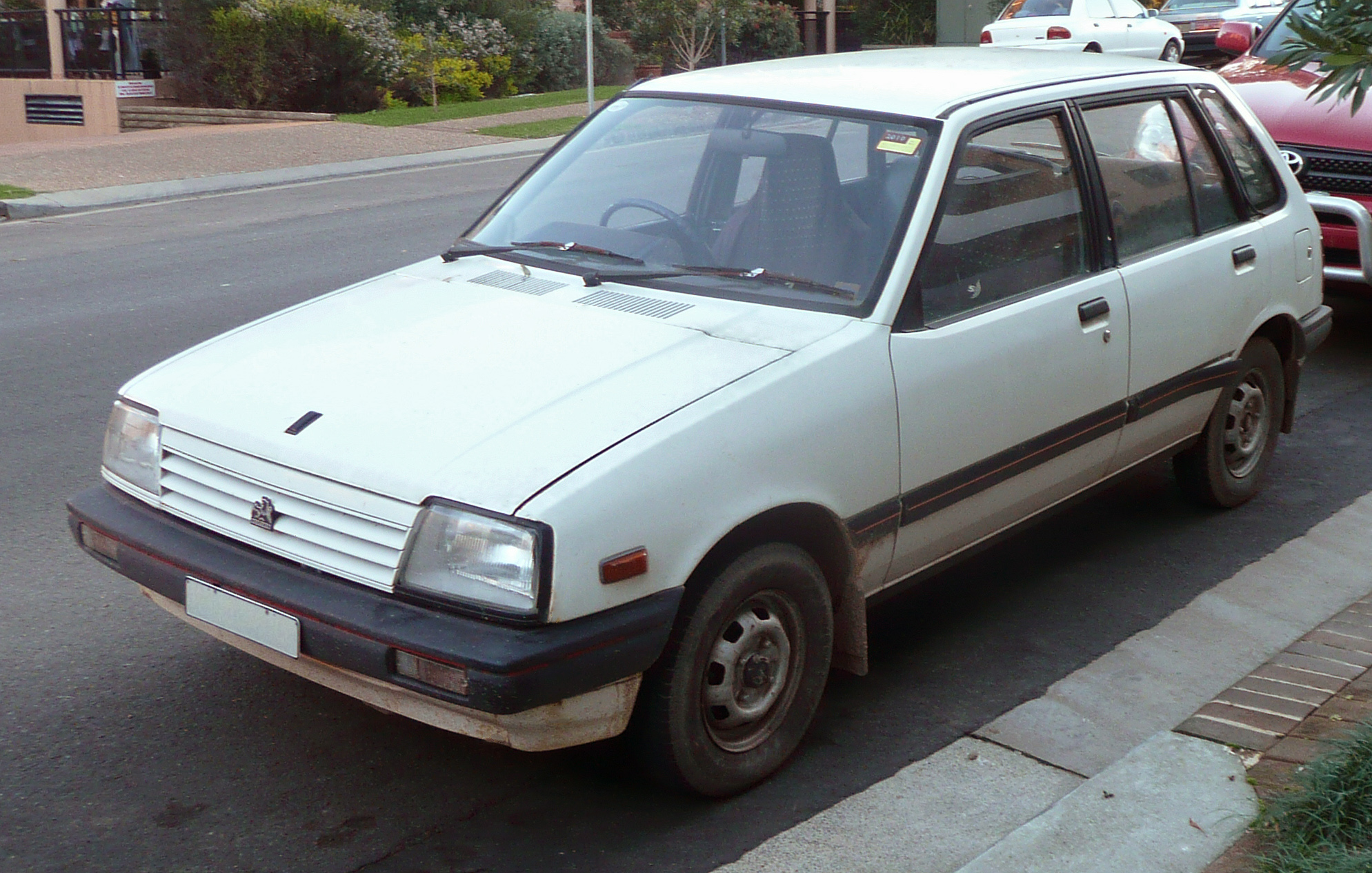
Holden Barina (MB) five-door with flush headlights (Australia)

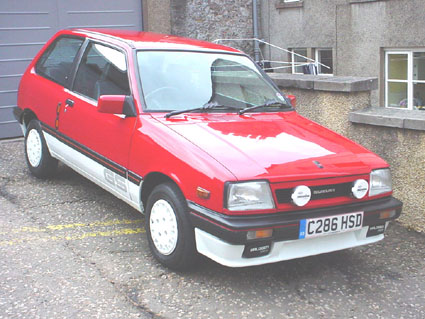
1985 Suzuki Swift 1.3 GS, original model with flush headlamps (UK)

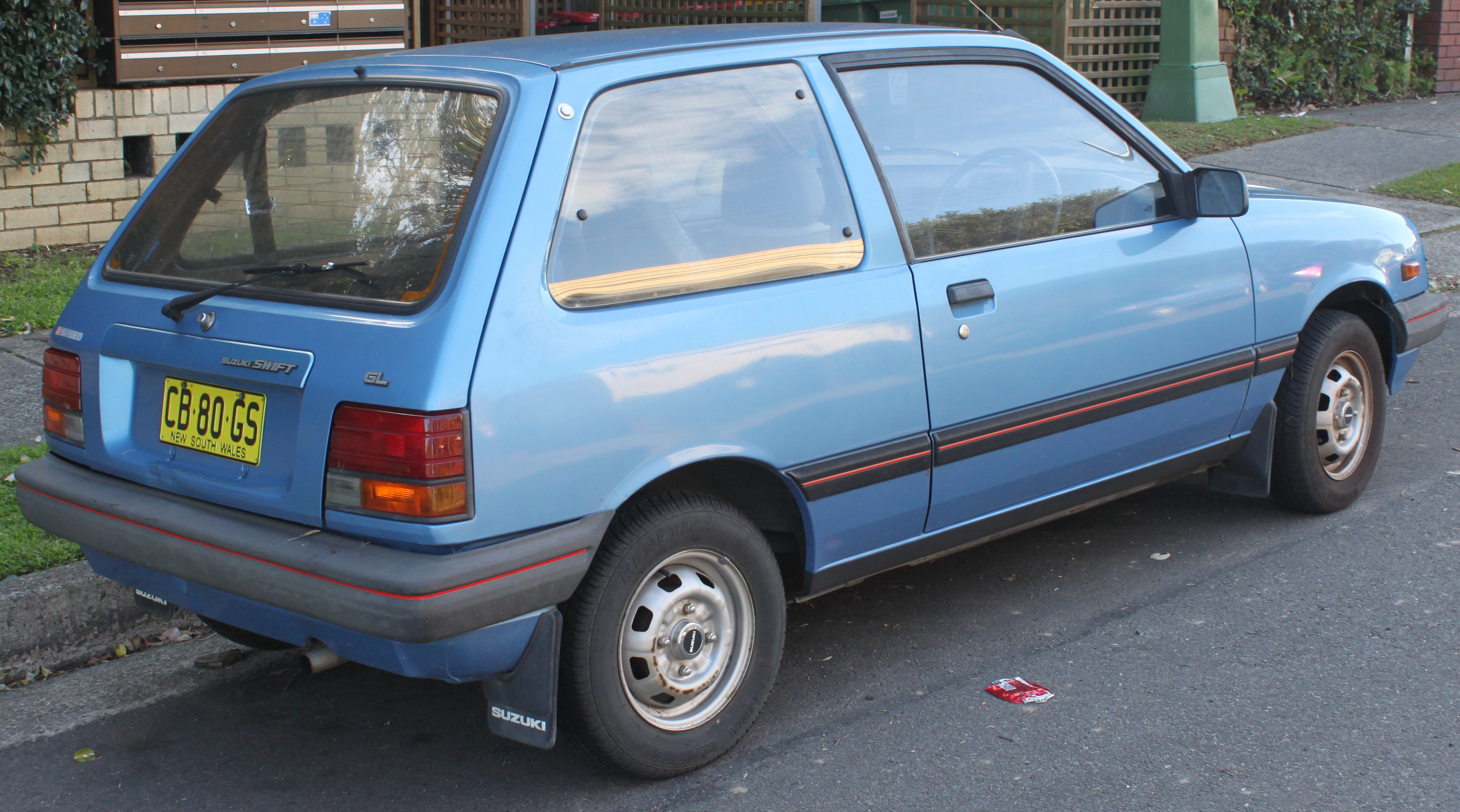
Rear view of early Suzuki Swift three-door (Australia)

=== Facelift version (1986) ===
The model was refreshed and upgraded in June 1986. The leaf springs of the rear end were replaced by coil springs, the front end (forward of the steel body) was remodelled with a more forward swept grille and headlights, the dashboard was remodelled, and the windscreen was now caulked in place (rather than being held with a molded seal as in the earlier model). The 1.0- and 1.3-liter were slightly detuned while the turbo model gained fuel injection and now produces 82 PS (81 hp; 60 kW) (JIS net), while the more powerful twin cam GTi model also arrived. The facelift model entered Indonesian production by early 1987 as the Forsa GL, and now featured some external trim pieces from the sporting GTi. A more luxurious GLX model was also added later.

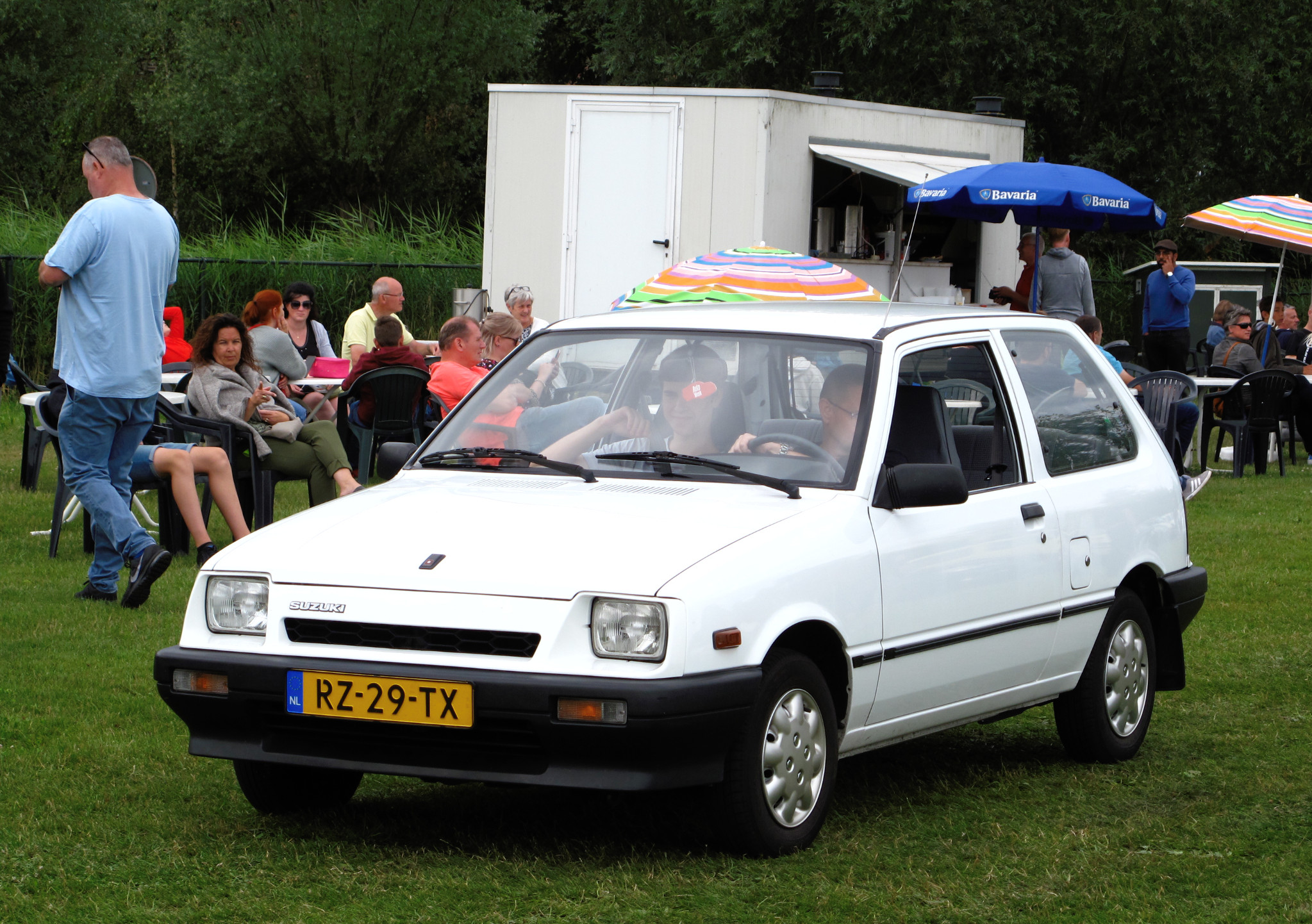
Base model three-door Suzuki Swift with sealed beam headlights (Europe)

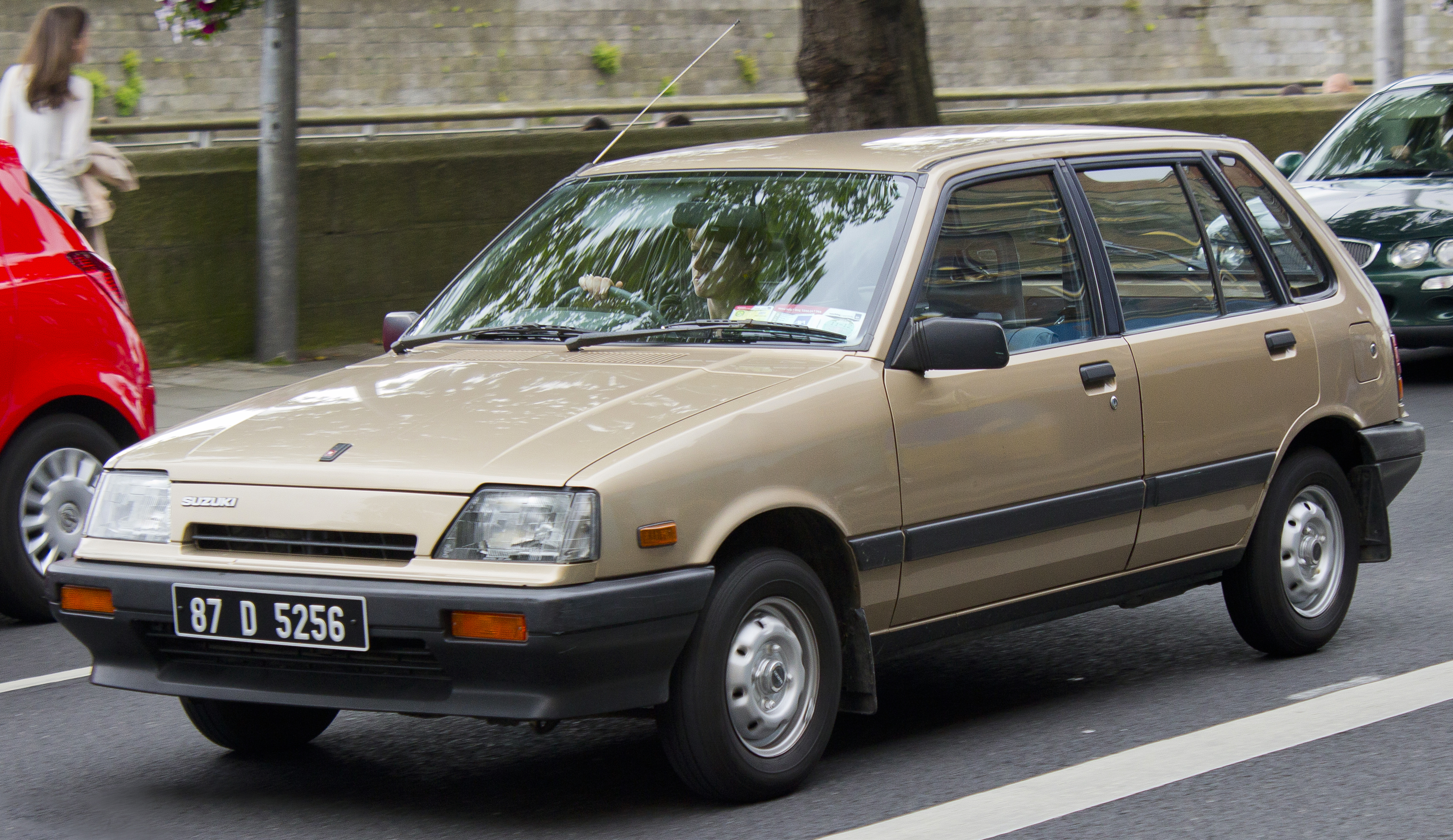
Five-door Swift GL with updated headlights and full plastic bumper (Europe)

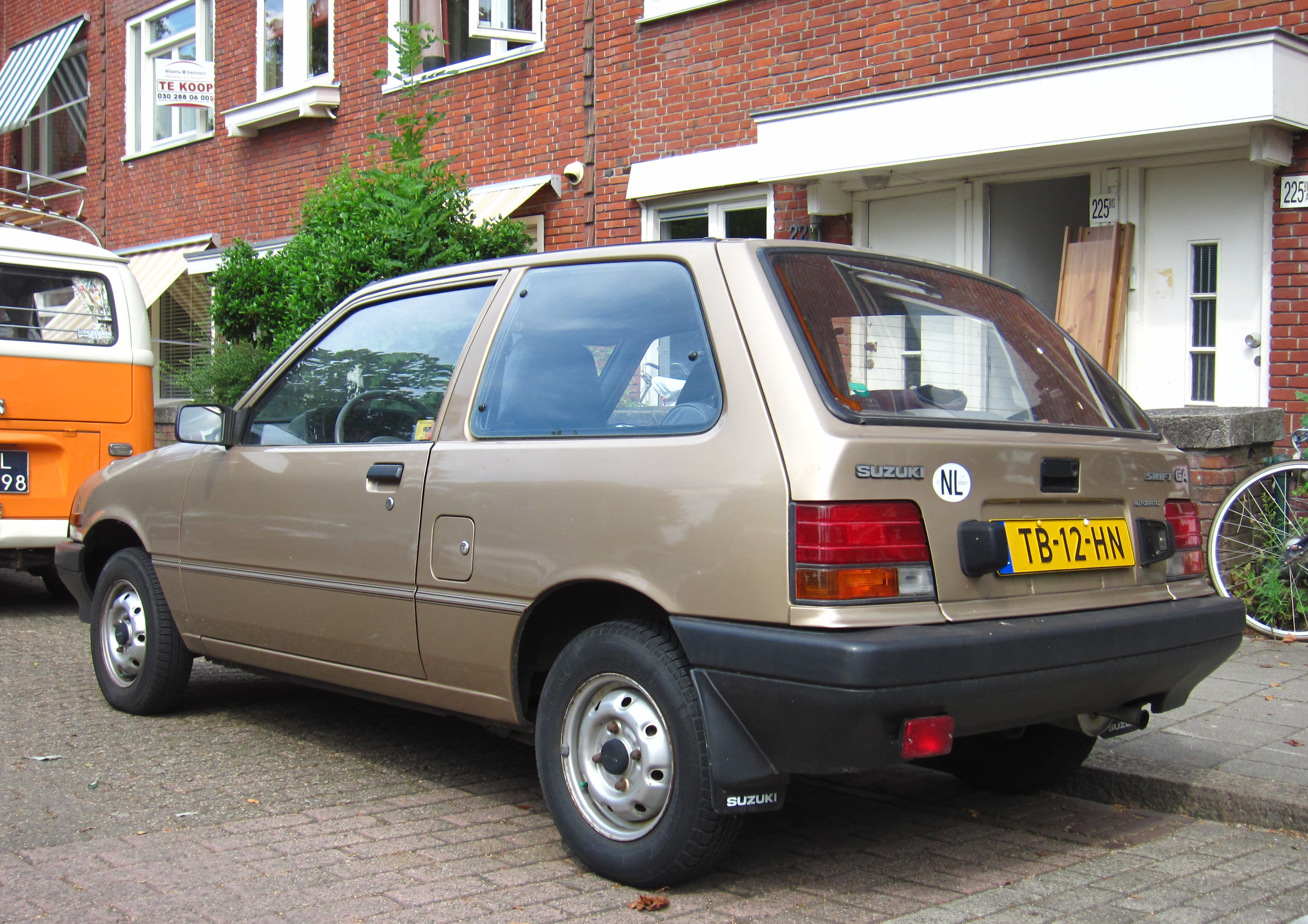
New "ducktail" style tailgate

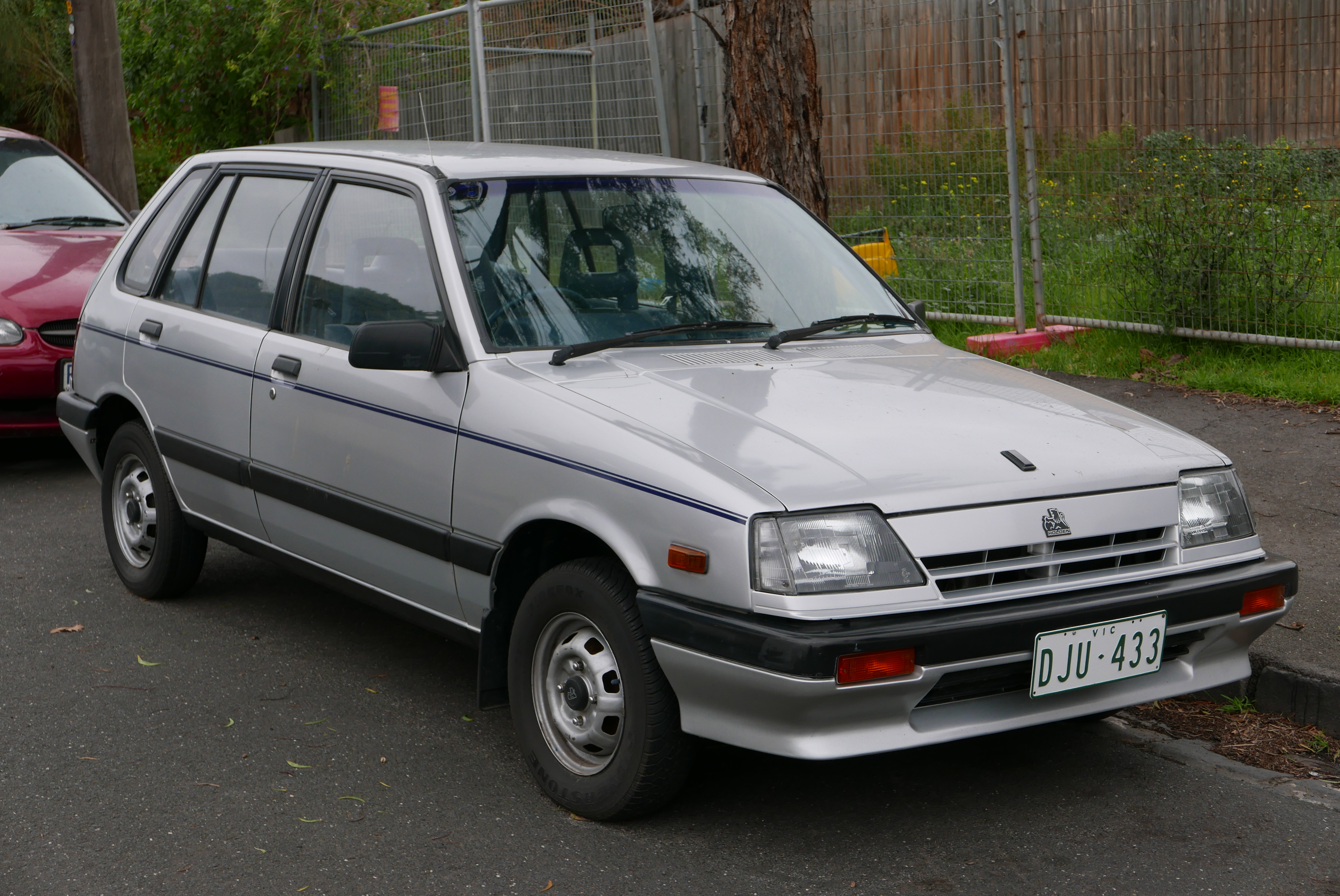
ML series Holden Barina five-door (Australia)

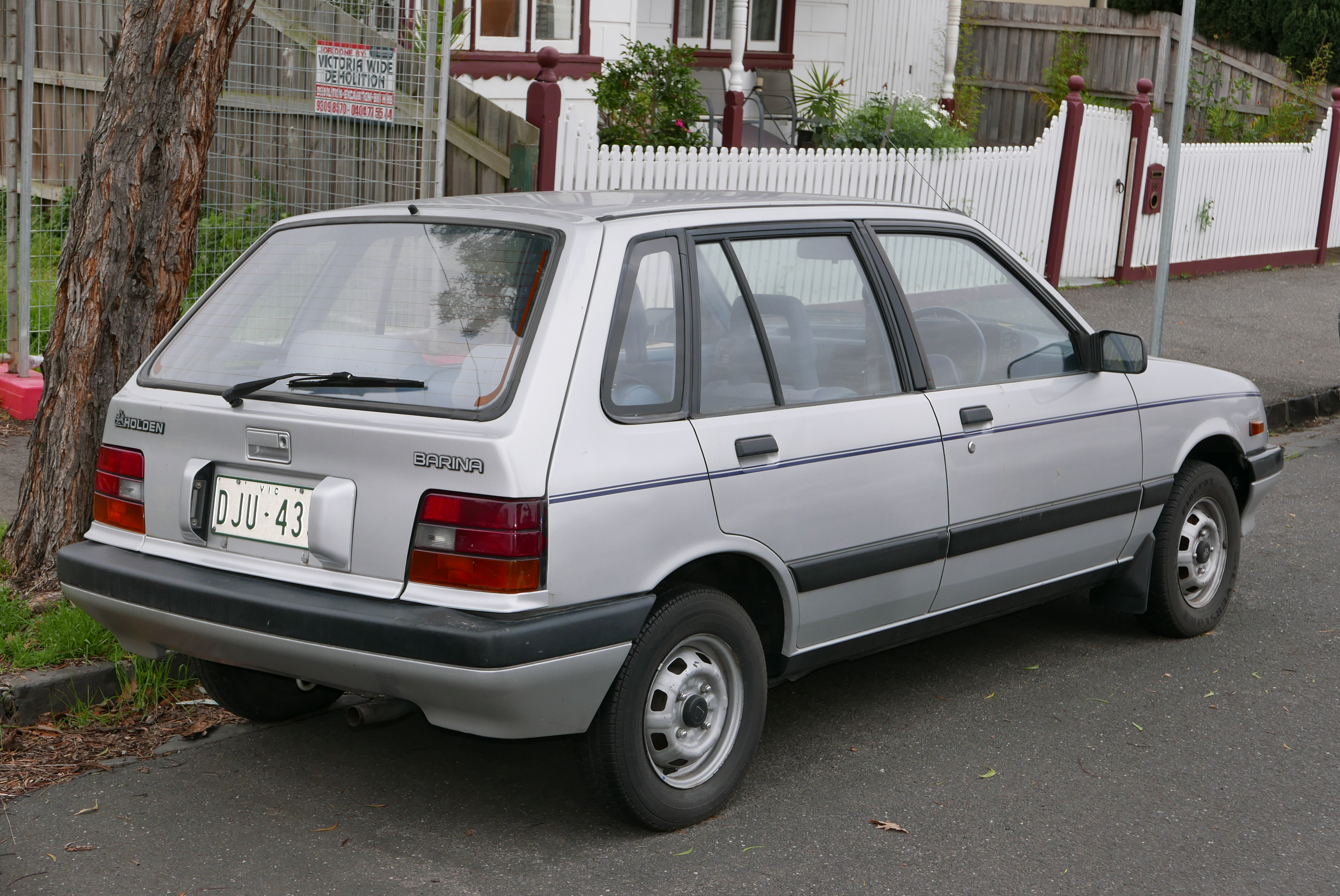
ML series Holden Barina five-door (Australia)

==== GTi ====
In June 1986, Suzuki introduced the flagship GTi (AA33S) model with both styling and performance upgrades over other models. It was originally available as a manual three-door hatch only, although later a five-door version called GXi was added. The GTi was one of the first Suzuki to feature electronic fuel injection on its G13B high performance twin cam engine. This new engine has 1298 cc thanks to a shorter stroke (75.5 mm, down from the previous 77 mm), fuel injection and 97 PS (96 hp; 71 kW) (JIS) in the Japanese market. In foreign markets, the car produced 101 PS (100 hp; 74 kW) at 6450 rpm and 83 lb⋅ft (113 N⋅m) of torque at 4950 rpm, giving the GTi a 0-60 mph (97 km/h) time of between 8.7 and 9.0 seconds, and a quarter mile time of 16.8 seconds at 83 mph (134 km/h) based on period road tests. The front brake system was also upgraded with larger diameter disc brakes.

Interior updates included velour highlighted door cards and seat trimming. A red theme across the dashboard displays, carpet and seat roping was standard as was a centre console. Electric adjustable mirrors were also added.

Exterior styling upgrades included a model-specific molded spoiler, side skirts, and a bumper bar incorporating fog lights. The rear suspension was also entirely different from lesser versions.

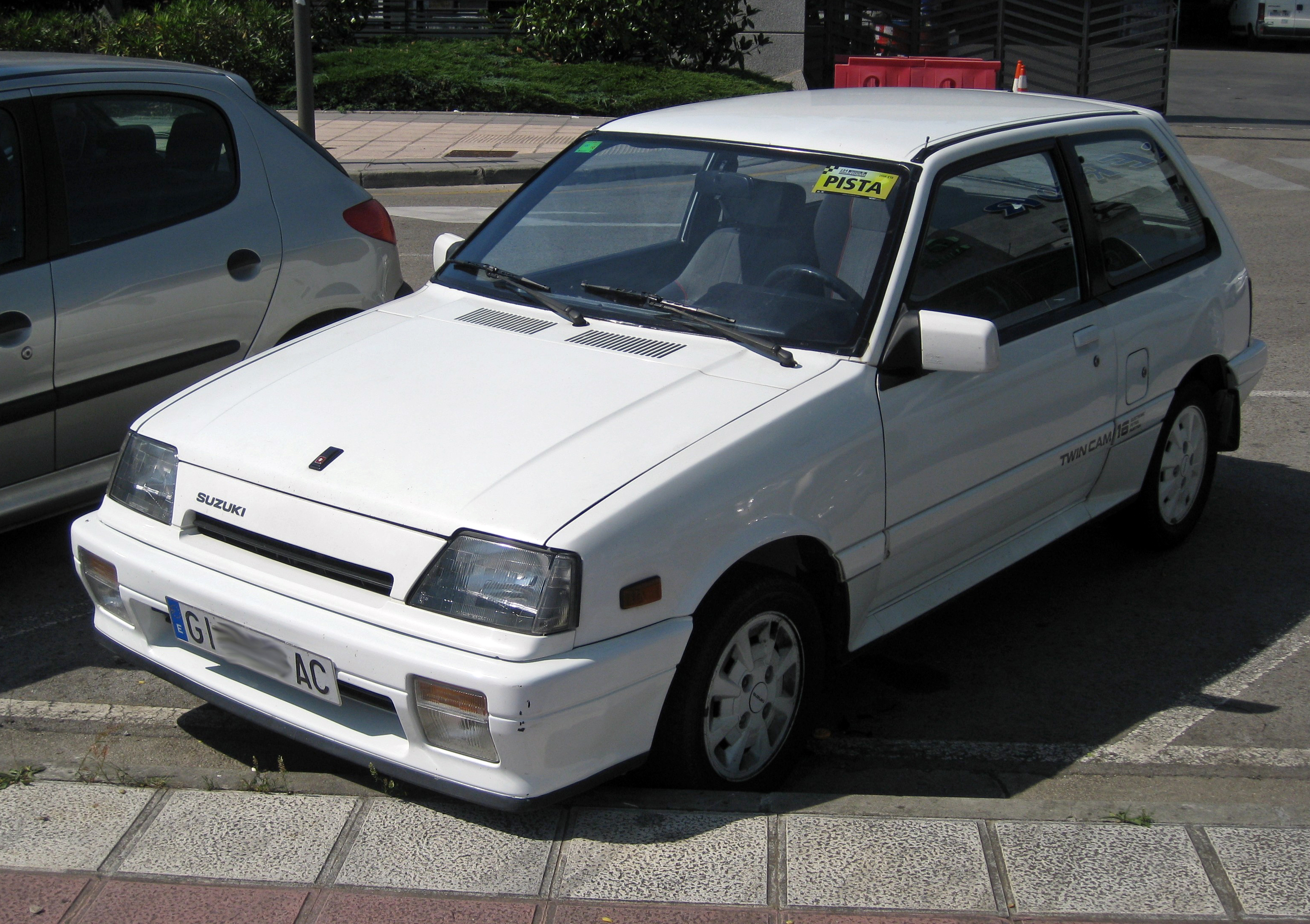
A 1988 Suzuki Swift GTi showing model specific fog lights

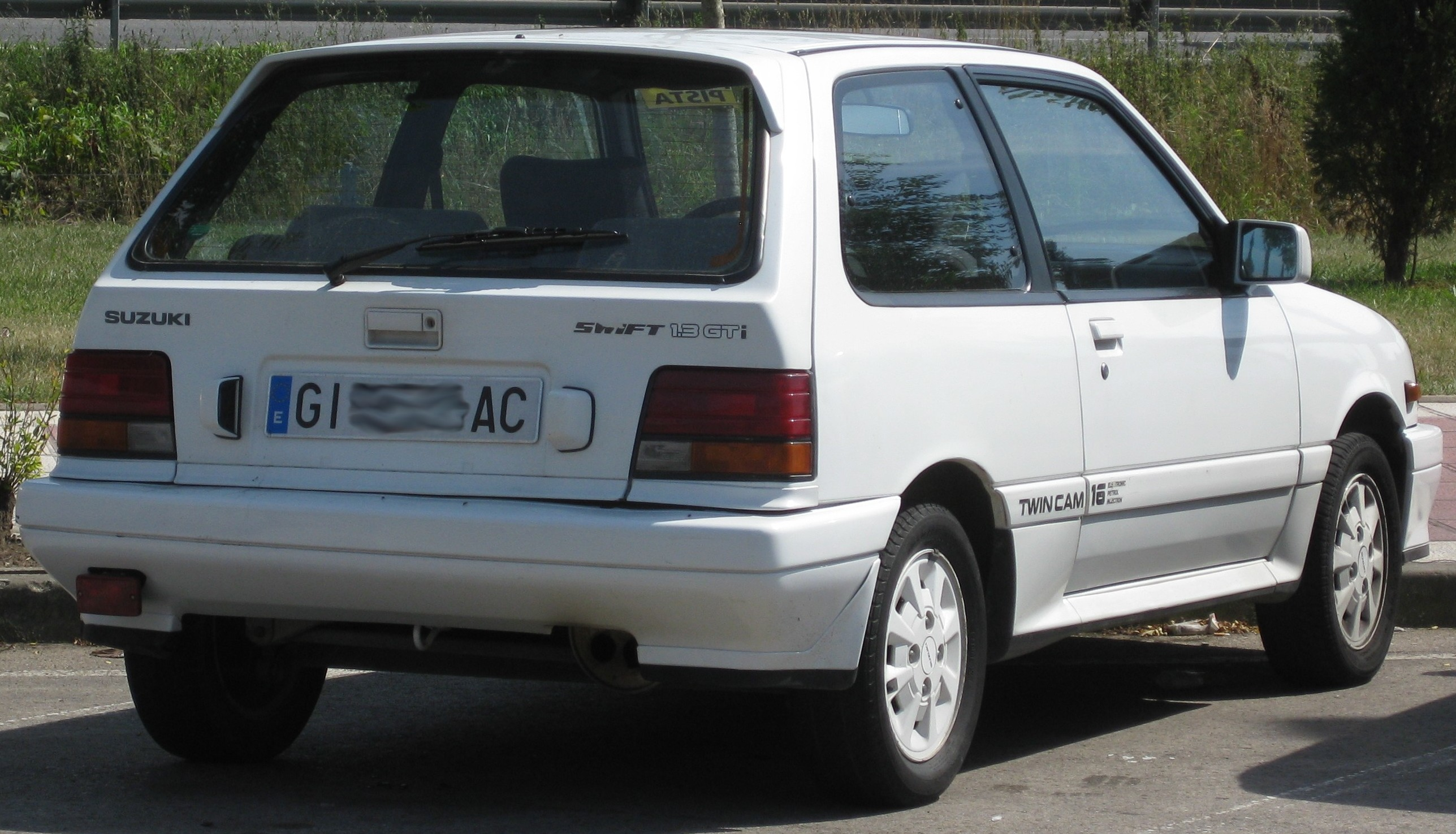
Rear view of a 1988 Suzuki Swift GTi

=== International markets ===
Market	Make & Model	Year	Body (Note: 3=3-door hatchback; 5=5-door hatchback)	Notes
Australia	Holden Barina	1985–1988	5	
Australia	Suzuki Swift	1985–1988	3/5	
Canada	Pontiac Firefly	1985–1988	3/5	
Canada	Chevrolet Sprint	1985–1988	3/5	
Canada	Suzuki Forsa	1985–1988	3/5	
Colombia	Chevrolet Sprint	1986–2004	5	Manufactured at GM Colmotores, Bogotá, Colombia
Indonesia	Suzuki Forsa	1985; 1986–1990	3; 5	SA310 with 970cc F10A four-cylinder (SA410)
Japan	Suzuki Cultus	1983–1988	3/5	Initially marketed as the SA-310
Japan	Isuzu Geminett	1986–1988	3	
N. America (Note: Sales began in Hawaii, Guam, N. Marianas and in western U.S. states.)	Suzuki Forsa	1985–1988	3/5	
New Zealand	Holden Barina	1985–1988	3/5	
New Zealand	Suzuki Swift	1985–1994	3/5	
Pakistan	Suzuki Khyber	1989–2000	5	Only came in GA trim, with the G10 engine.
USA	Chevrolet Sprint	1984–1988	3/5	

Beginning in 1985, Cooper Motor Corporation (CMC) of Nairobi, Kenya, also assembled the SA310.

Japanese market designations

- 1983～1988 AA41S
- 1986～1988 A43S, AB43S, AA53S, AB53S, AA33S, AB33S, AA43V

==== North America ====
===== Suzuki Forsa =====
It was marketed in Ecuador, Chile, Indonesia, Canada and the U.S. from 1985 to 1988 – with Suzuki offering the supermini with either a 48 hp (49 PS; 36 kW) (SAE net) carbureted 1.0-liter (993 cc) inline-three cylinder or 70 hp (71 PS; 52 kW) (SAE net) fuel injected 1.0-liter (993 cc) inline 3 cylinder turbocharged engine. The Indonesian market Forsa has carbureted 1.0-liter (970 cc) four-cylinder engine.

An undetermined number of Forsa superminis were imported to Hawaii and Puerto Rico and some of them have found their way to the U.S. mainland. The EPA lists the 1985 Forsa model as the Suzuki SA310 (the original JDM name for the Cultus, Forsa and Swift), no listing for 1986, and both the Forsa and Forsa Turbo for 1987 and 1988.

In 1984, Suzuki and General Motors announced they would sell rebadged models of the Suzuki Cultus in North America as Chevrolets and Pontiacs, with Suzuki selling their own version as the Forsa. As it turned out, the Pontiac Firefly was only sold in Canada.

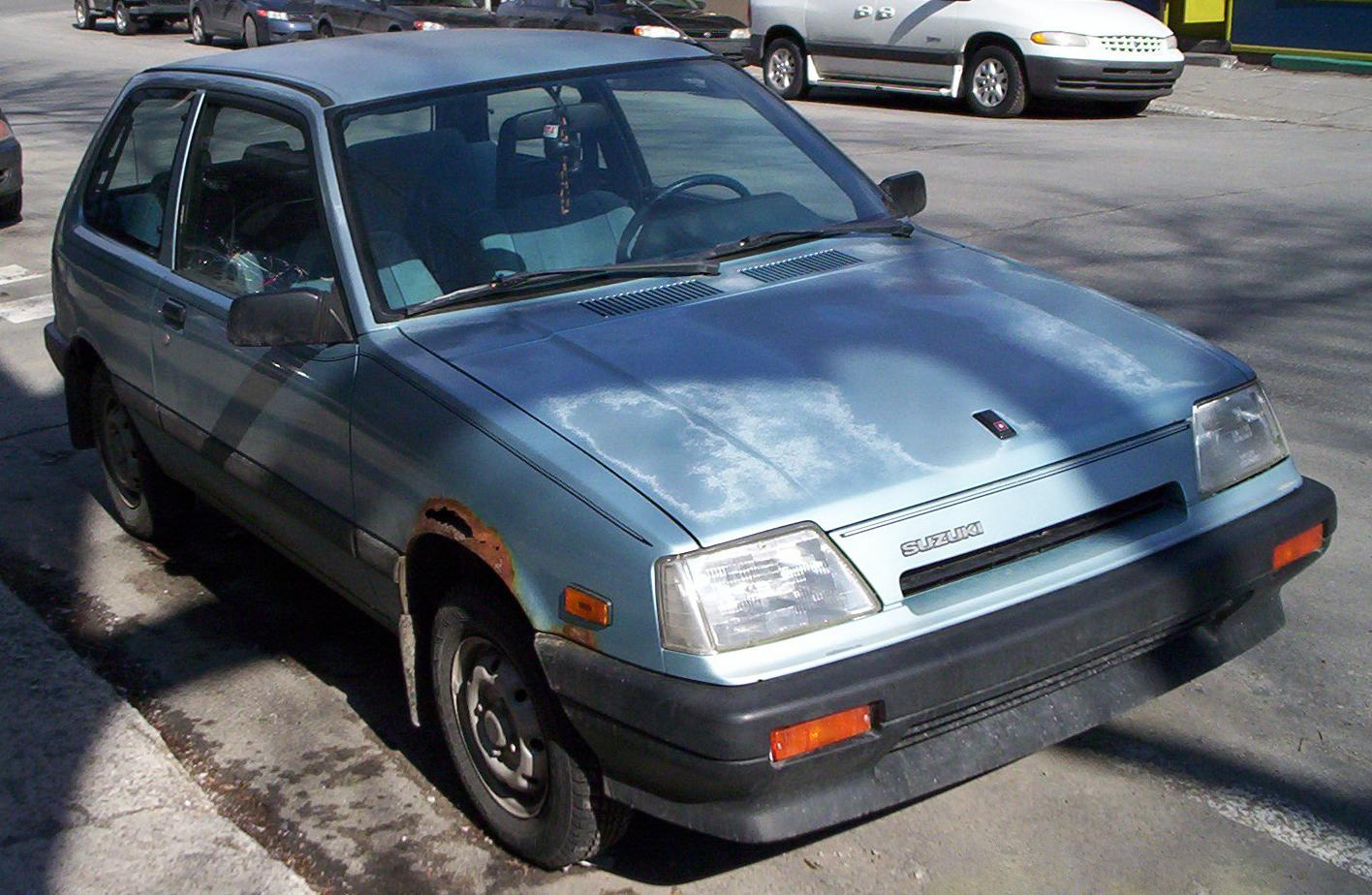
Suzuki Forsa three-door (Canada)

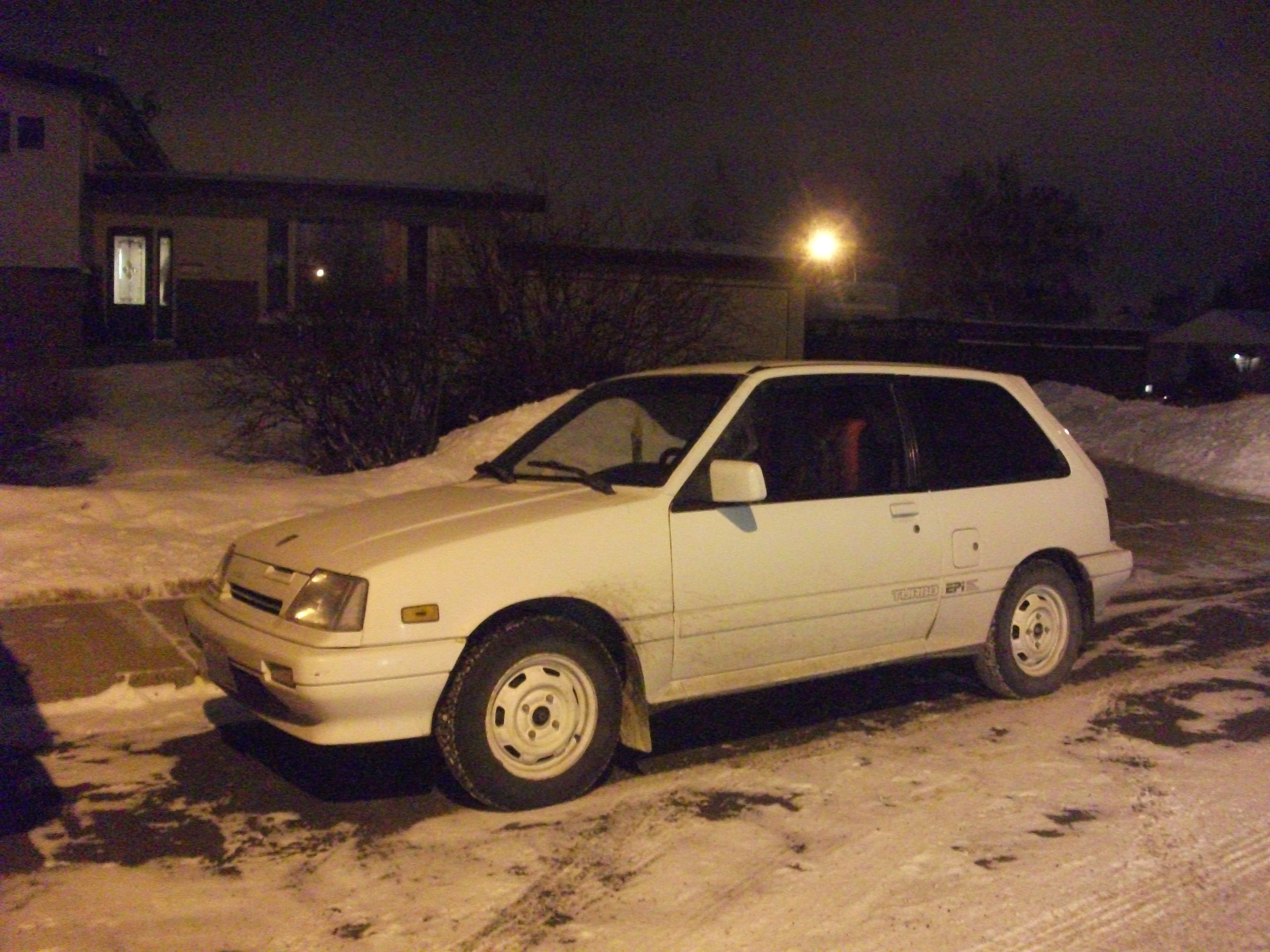
Suzuki Forsa Turbo (Canada)

===== Chevrolet Sprint =====
In 1985, GM began marketing in North America as the Chevrolet Sprint, reusing the name from a previous GMC vehicle. The Chevrolet Sprint was sold only in the Western United States until nationwide sale was begun in 1986. Sprint consumers had a choice of ER, Base, and Turbo models. In Canada, the car was sold as Suzuki Forsa and Pontiac Firefly. Firefly marketed in FE, Turbo, and Base models. GM continued to market the Chevette alongside the Sprint until 1987. In the United States, the Chevrolet Sprint label was supplanted by the Geo Metro for the second-generation Cultus, but it continued to be used for a while longer in Canada.

The "Sprint" and "Sprint Metro" differed in their engines, though both were computer controlled carb systems. From 1985 to 1988, the carbureted 1.0-liter 3-cylinder engine used a hemispherical head design. Later, fuel injection required the cylinder head for 1989 be redesigned to add the additional cooling required, reducing gas mileage. For the 1988 model year, the naturally-aspirated model was named the Chevrolet Sprint Metro.

The Sprint was originally offered in parts of the western US for the 1985 model year; subsequently Chevrolet marketed the Sprint across North America. All models were initially three-door hatchbacks. Starting in 1986, a five-door hatchback version was offered, called the Sprint Plus. That year, another model called the Sprint ER was offered that included a few extra features, such as an "upshift" light to indicate the ideal speed to shift to the next highest gear on manual transmission models. Although air conditioning was offered in all years, the three-speed automatic transmission did not become available until 1986. All models featured front-wheel drive and 12-inch steel wheels. The Turbo Sprint received white hub caps, regardless of body color.

Turbocharged versions of the 1.0-liter three-cylinder engine were available in the Turbo Sprint in both the United States and Canada beginning with the 1987 model year. The fuel injected Turbo Sprint utilized an IHI RHB32 turbocharger. Colors were limited to white and red for the Turbo Sprint. Sales were insignificant in the United States, but somewhat stronger in Canada. 6,360 cars were sold in model year 1987 and an additional 1,544 examples in 1988, for a total of 7,904 examples.

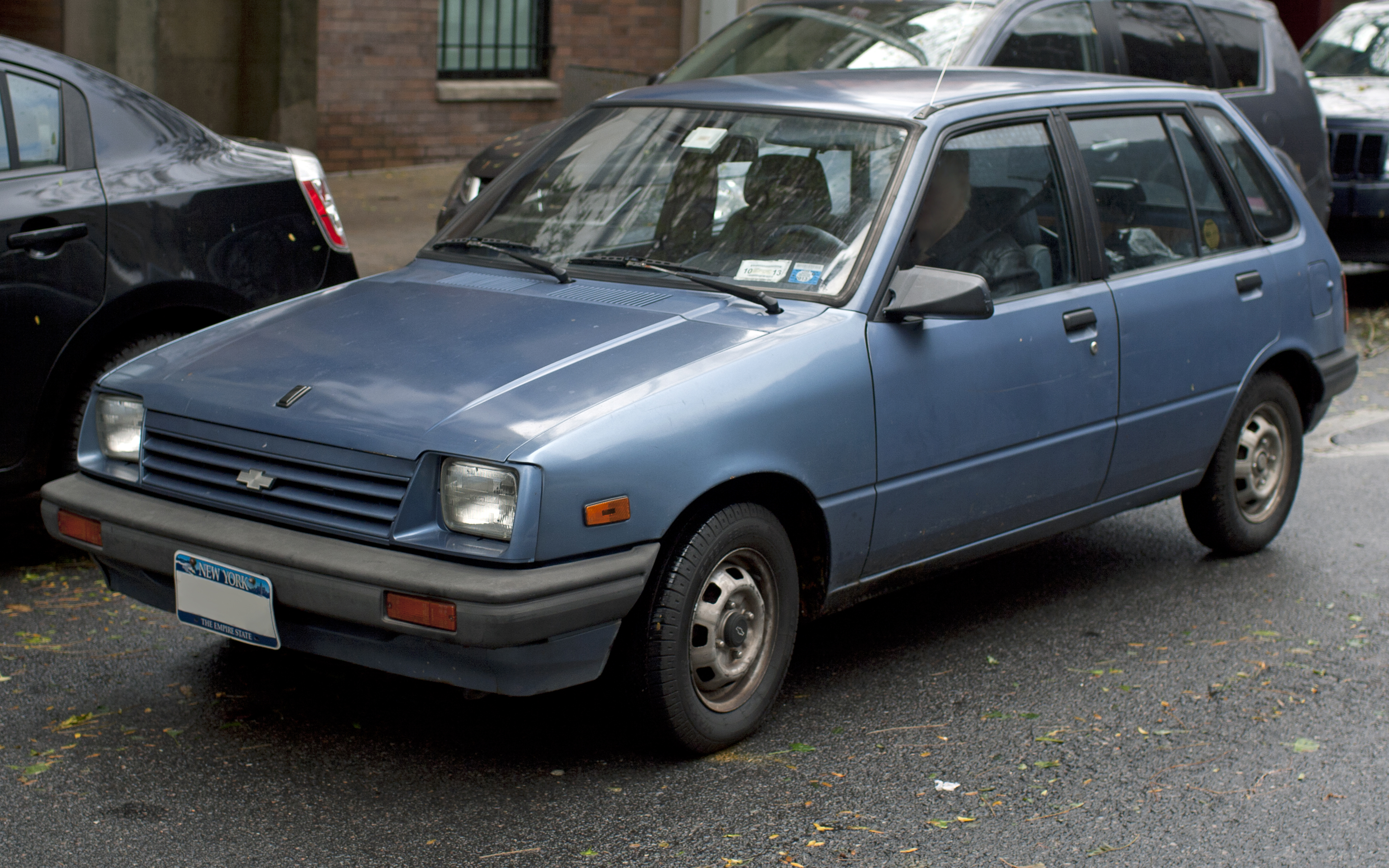
1986 Chevrolet Sprint 5-door, showing older headlight style (US)

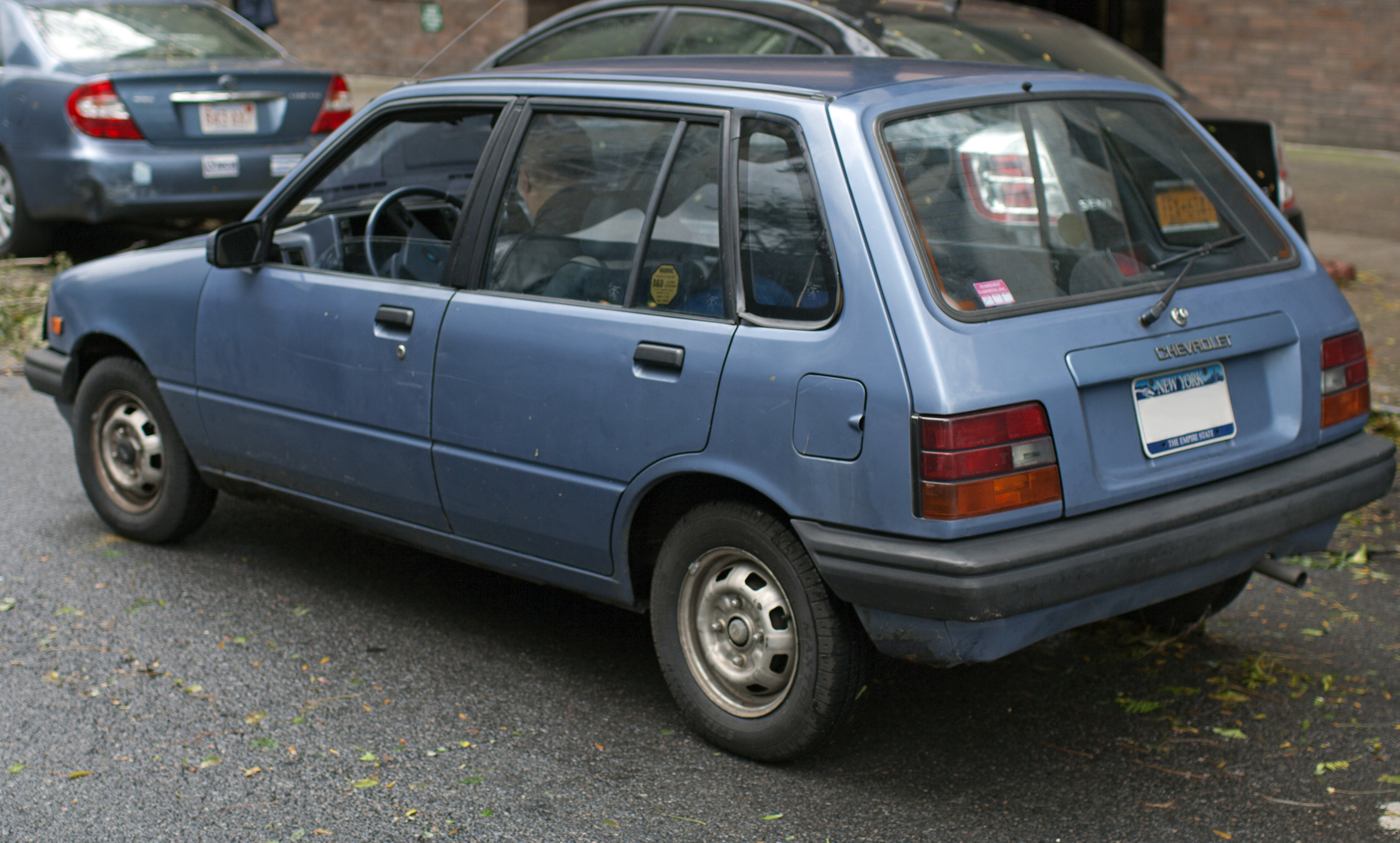
Rear view with different tail lights style. Only applied to Chevrolet Sprint, Canadian Pontiac Firefly and Australian Holden Barina.

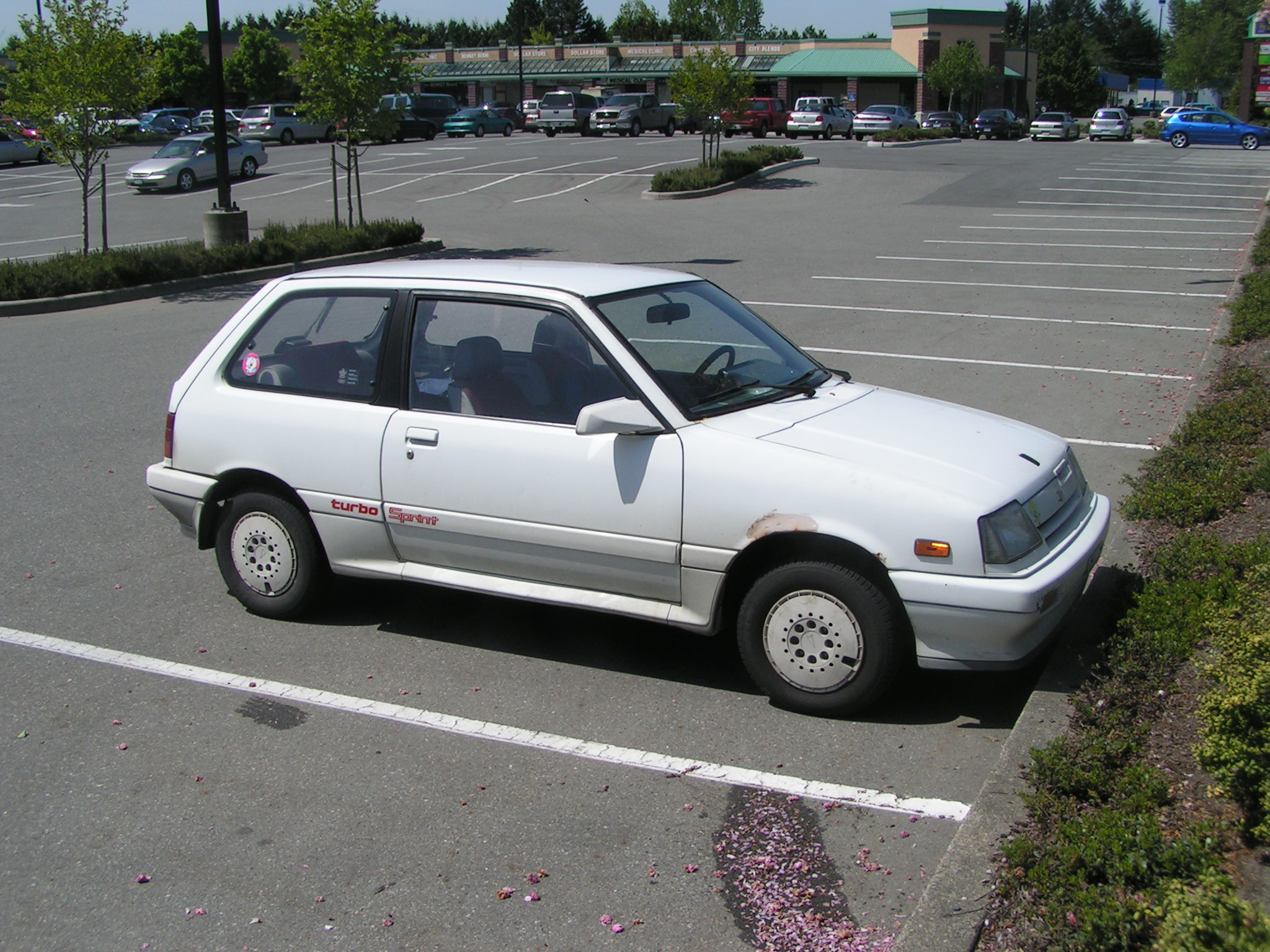
Chevrolet Sprint Turbo (US)

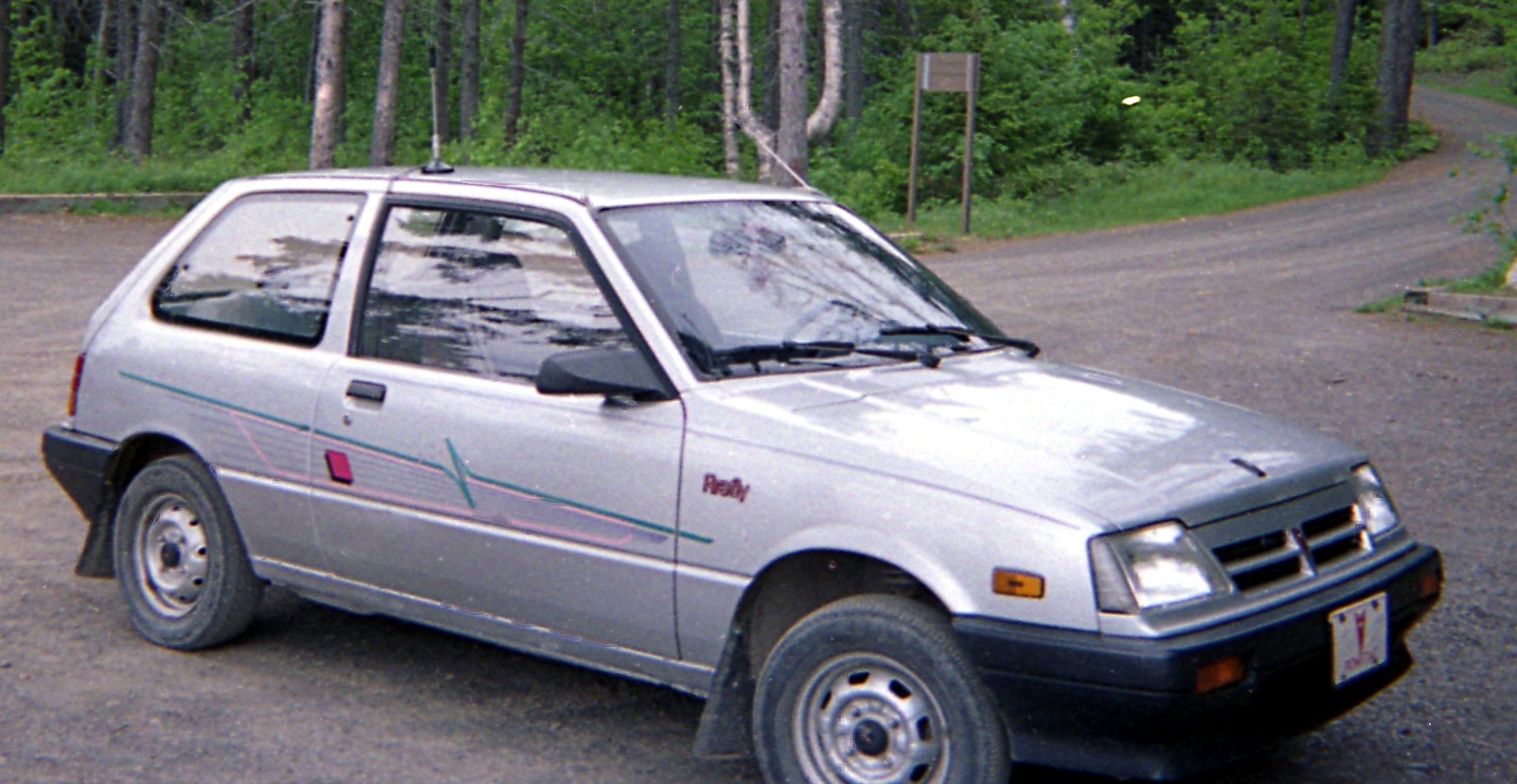
Pontiac Firefly (Canada)

==== Colombia ====
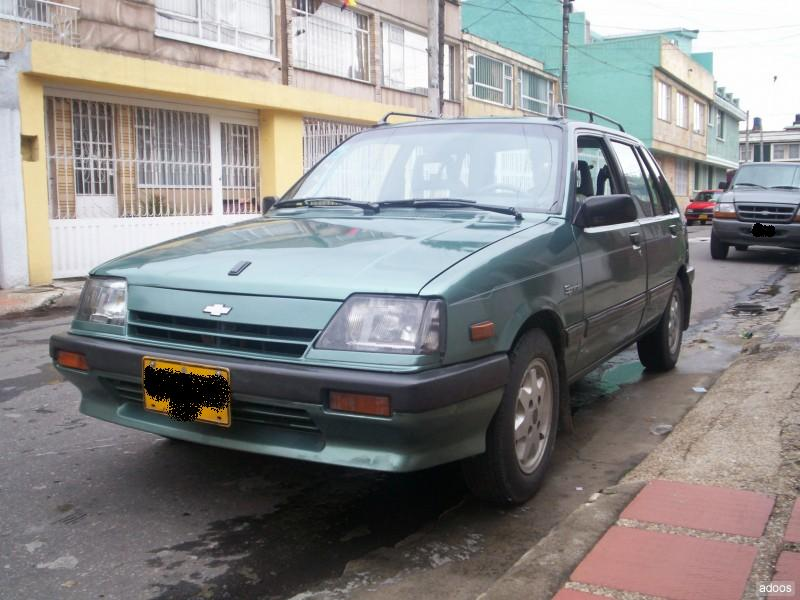
Chevrolet Sprint Gen I (Colombia)

The name "Chevette Sprint" was considered before simply calling the Colombian model (first generation) the "Chevrolet Sprint" — to distinguish it from the originally Opel-designed knock down kits imported from Brazil for assembly in Colombia. When presented on 7 October 1986, the Sprint caused a sensation. Colombian Sprints were all five-door hatchbacks fitted with the 993 cc three-cylinder G10A engine and a five-speed manual transmission. The Sprint remained in production virtually unchanged until 2004, with a total production of 70,848. Slight modifications were made in 1987, including increasing the wheel sizes from 12" to 13" and with modernized bumpers and headlights. Another slight update took place in 1997 bringing with it monopoint fuel injection and an increase in power from 50 to 53 PS (49 to 52 hp; 37 to 39 kW).

==== Pakistan ====
The first generation Cultus was sold in Pakistan as Suzuki Khyber, by Pak Suzuki assembly line, and produced between 1989 and 2000, only in GA trim level. It was equipped with a four-stroke engine based on G10A platform matted to a five-speed manual gearbox. Production was ended in 2000, replaced by second generation Cultus.

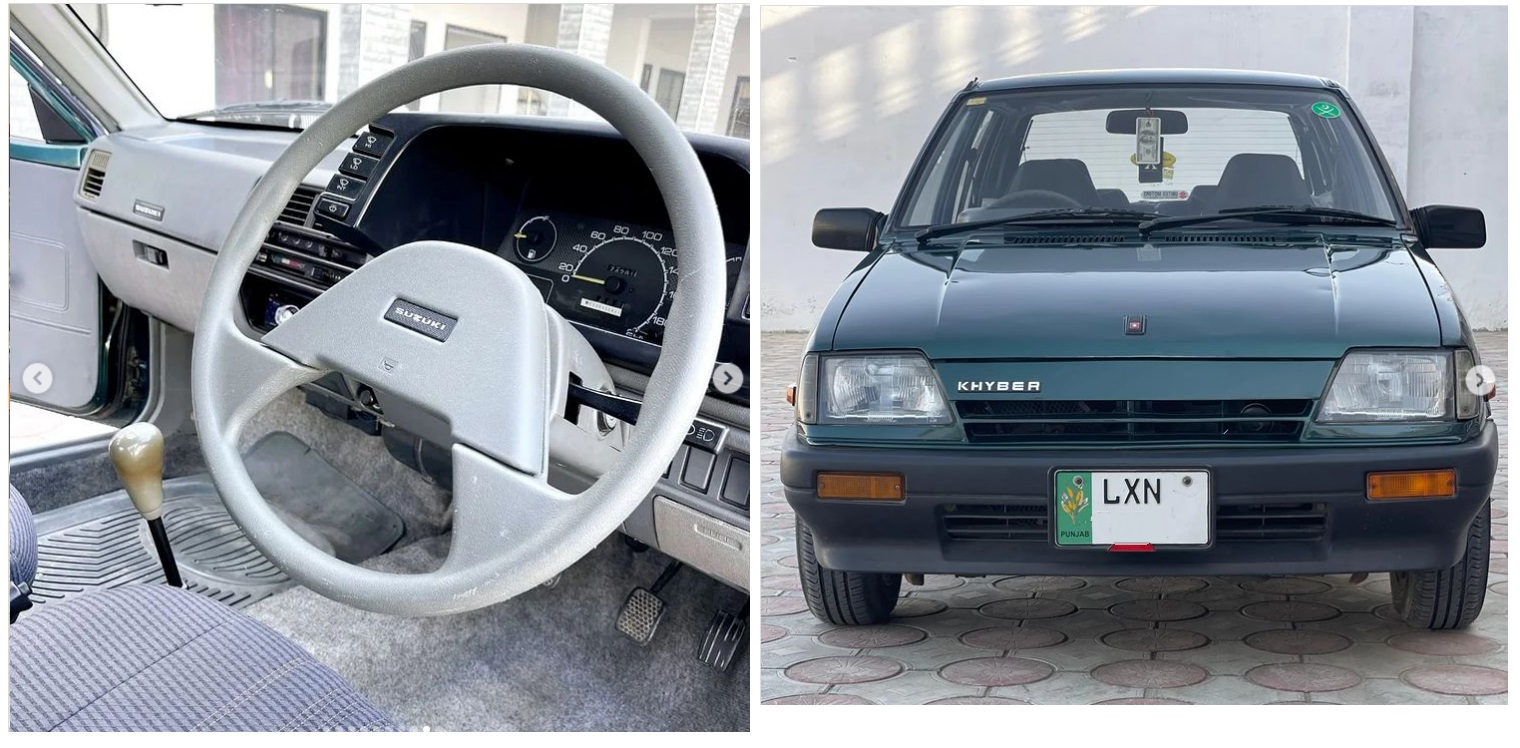
Picture of Suzuki Khyber, produced in Pakistan.

The version that rolled out during its end of life were termed as Limited Editions, featuring unique metallic colors and new audio system by Clarion.

== Second generation (1988) ==
Second generation (SF)
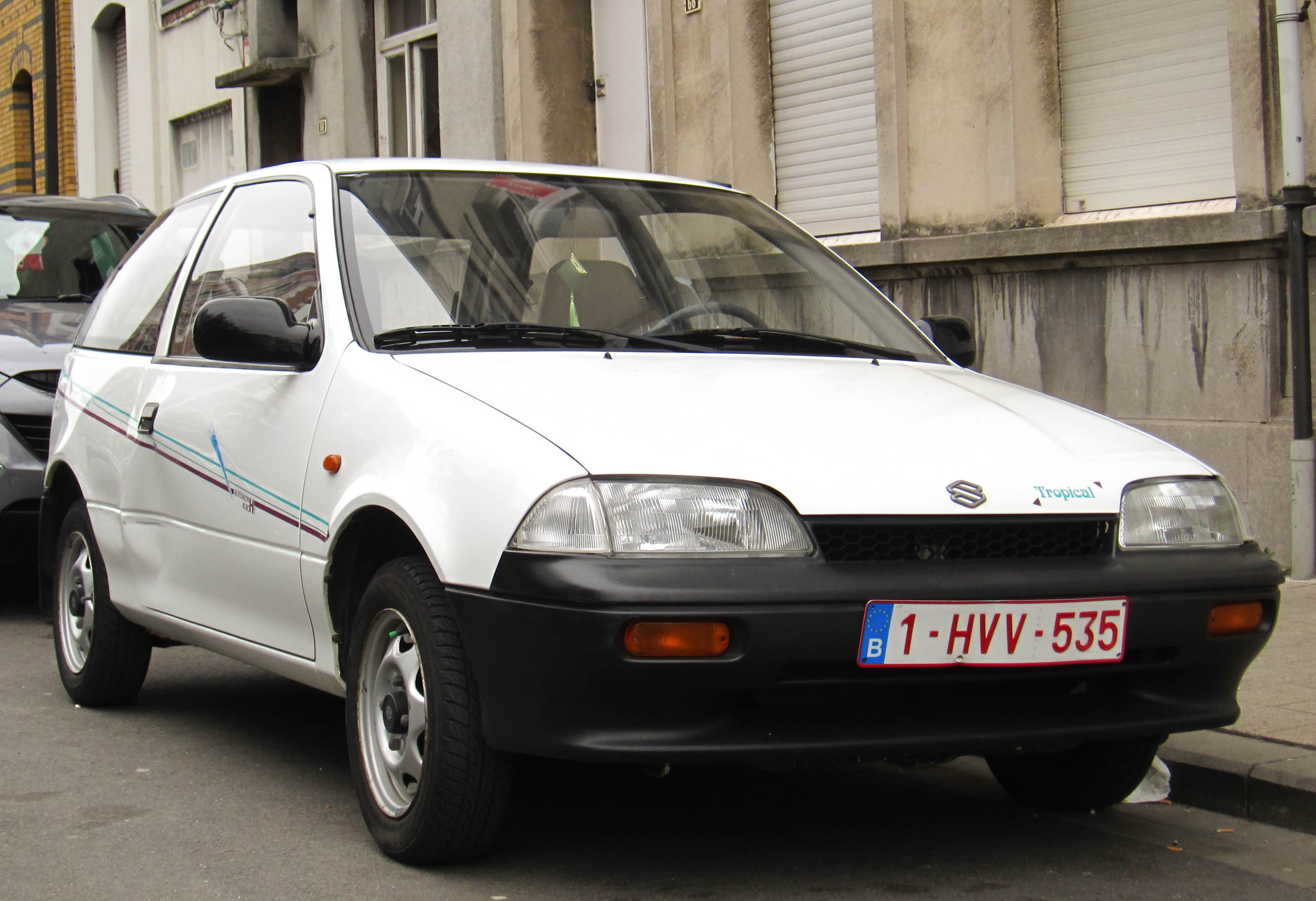
- Suzuki Swift GA 3-door hatchback (pre-facelift, Belgium)

Overview
- Also called: Suzuki Forsa (Ecuador and Indonesia; pre-facelift); Suzuki Esteem (Indonesia; sedan facelift); Suzuki Eleny (Indonesia; hatchback facelift); Suzuki Margalla (Pakistan; sedan); Suzuki Swift (global); Changan Suzuki Lingyang (China; sedan); Chevrolet Sprint (Canada, Chile and Middle East); Chevrolet Swift (Colombia, Ecuador and Venezuela); Chevrolet Forsa (Ecuador); Geo Metro (Canada and US); Holden Barina (Aus/NZ; hatchback); Maruti Suzuki 1000/Esteem (India; sedan); Pontiac Firefly (Canada and Middle East); Subaru Justy (Europe; hatchback)
- Production: 1988–2000 (Japan); 1989–1993 (Canada); 1989–2007 (India); 1990–1996 (Indonesia); 1991–1998 & 2000–2016 (Pakistan); 1991–2004 (Colombia); 1992–1996 (Venezuela); 1992–2003 (Ecuador & Hungary); 1999–2015 (China)
- Assembly: Japan: Kosai (Suzuki Kosai Plant); Canada: Ingersoll, Ontario (CAMI Automotive); China: Chongqing (Changan Suzuki); Colombia: Bogotá (GM Colmotores); Ecuador: Quito (AYMESA/GM de Ecuador); Hungary: Esztergom (Magyar Suzuki); India: Gurgaon (Maruti Suzuki); Indonesia: Bekasi (Suzuki Indomobil Motor); Pakistan: Karachi (Pak Suzuki Motors); Venezuela: Valencia (GM Venezolana)

Body and chassis
- Body style: 2-door convertible; 3/5-door hatchback; 4-door sedan
- Layout: Transverse front-engine, front-wheel-drive / four-wheel-drive

Powertrain
- Engine: 1.0 L G10A SOHC 6V I3; 1.0 L G10BB SOHC 16V I4; 1.0 L G10T SOHC 6V I3 turbo; 1.3 L G13B DOHC 16V I4; 1.3 L G13BA SOHC 8V I4; 1.3 L G13BB SOHC 16V I4; 1.5 L G15A SOHC 16V I4; 1.6 L G16A SOHC 16V I4
- Transmission: 4/5-speed manual; 3/4-speed automatic; CVT (convertible)

Dimensions
- Wheelbase: 2,265 mm (89.2 in) (3-door/convertible); 2,365 mm (93.1 in) (5-door/sedan)
- Length: 3,745 mm (147 in) (3-door/convertible); 3,845 mm (151.4 in) (5-door); 4,095 mm (161.2 in) (sedan)
- Width: 1,575 mm (62.0 in) (3/5-door); 1,590 mm (62.6 in) (sedan/convertible)
- Height: 1,350 mm (53.1 in) (3-door); 1,380 mm (54 in) (5-door/sedan); 1,340 mm (52.8 in) (convertible)
- Curb weight: 680–910 kg (1,499.1–2,006.2 lb)

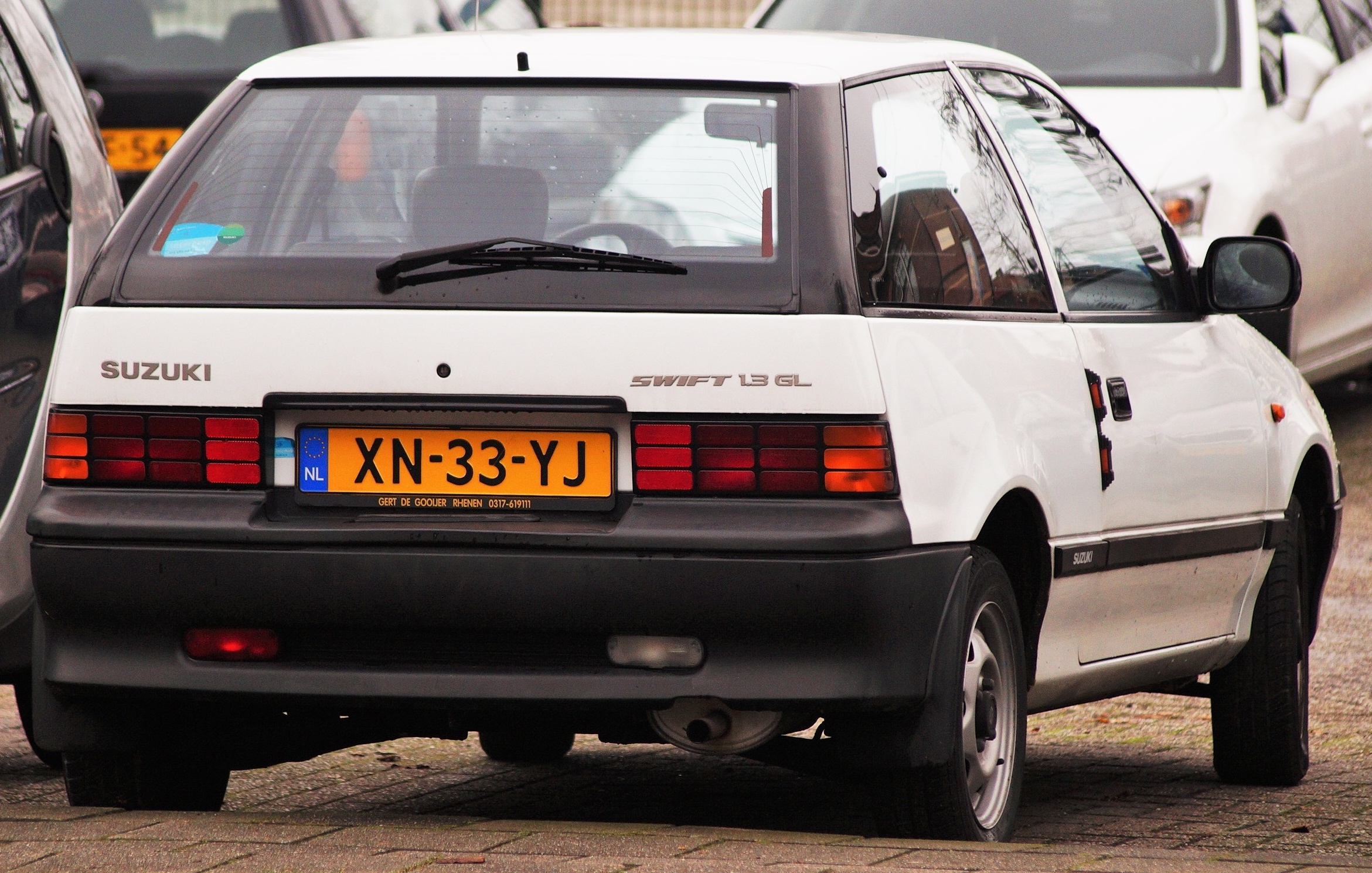
Suzuki Swift GL 3-door hatchback (pre-facelift, Europe)

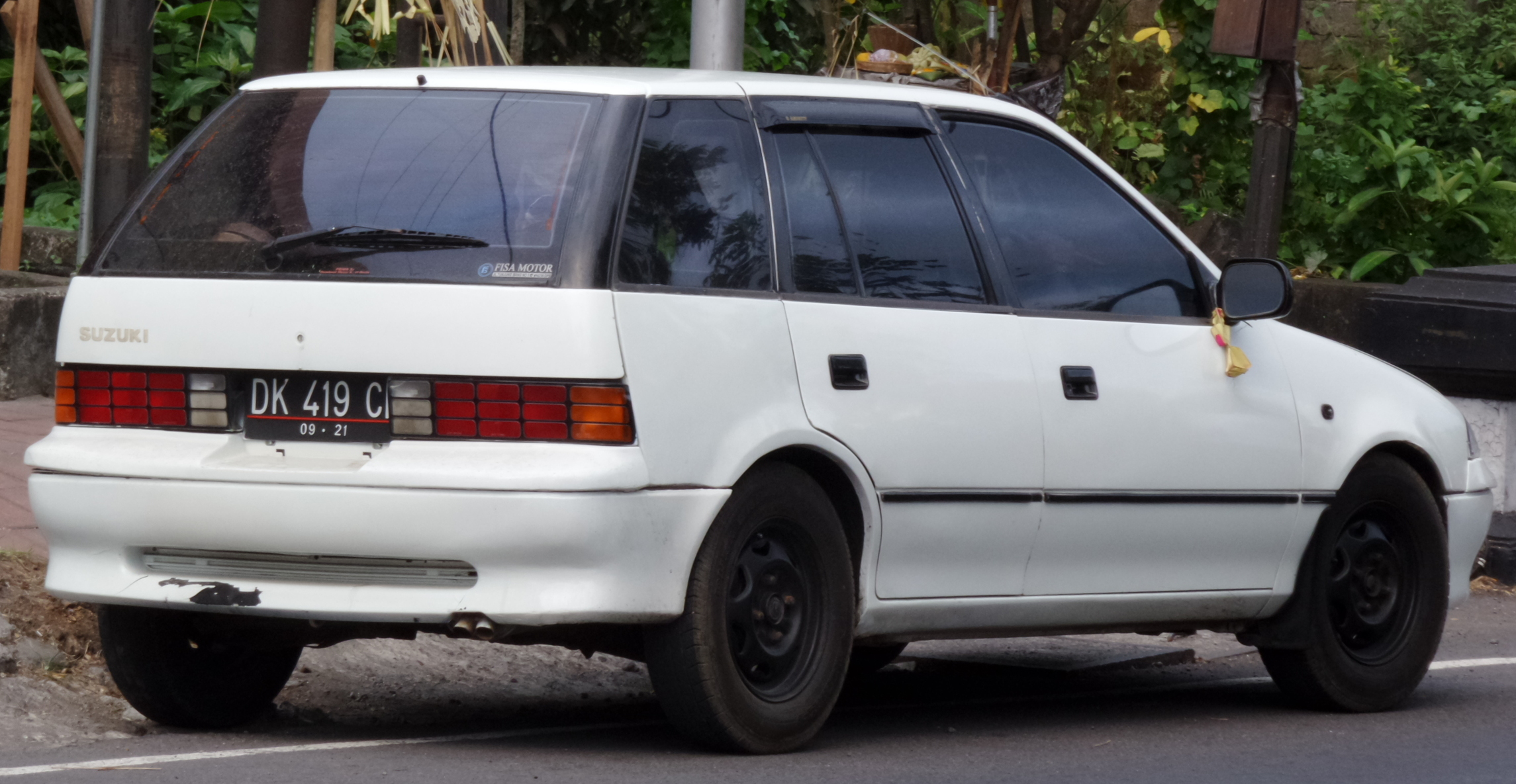
Suzuki Forsa Amenity 5-door hatchback (pre-facelift, Indonesia), with longer tail lights for markets with short rear registration plate.

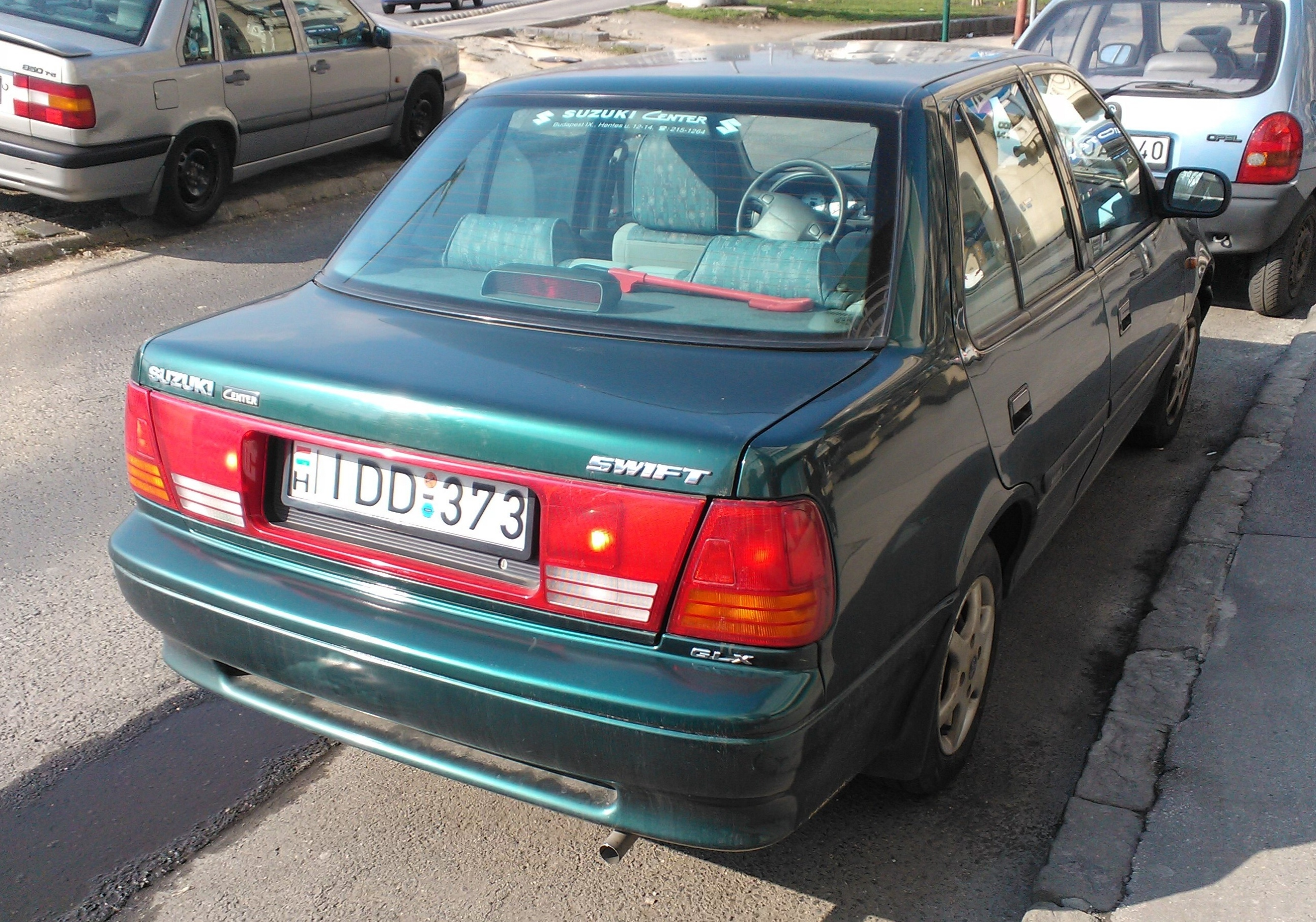
Suzuki Swift GLX sedan (pre-facelift, Europe)

The second generation Cultus first appeared in Japan in September 1988, followed by its European debut as the Swift at the Brussels Auto Salon in October. General Motors, whose Design Center assisted in its development, designated it the GM M platform. The chassis, engines, and drivetrains were developed by Suzuki, being mostly modified variants of the first generation Cultus. The second generation offered new styling and four-wheel independent strut suspension. A turbocharged three-cylinder version remained fairly popular in Canada, which was the only market for the version which was not even available in its homeland Japan.

It was available with a 1.0-liter three-cylinder with a power output of 53 PS (52 hp; 39 kW), a 1.3-liter four-cylinder, and later a 1.6-liter four-cylinder (for the sedan only). The higher powered Cultus/Swift GTi had an improved G13B engine which featured hollow camshafts, stronger web casting on the engine block, a better flowing intake manifold (the prior generation intake manifold had its shape compromised to fit into the engine bay), and its ECU now had electronic control over ignition timing. It now put out 101 PS (100 hp; 74 kW) of power. The GTi also featured all wheel disc brakes. Japanese GTi's have a much higher compression ratio (11.5:1) and accordingly more power at 115 PS (113 hp; 85 kW), and were also offered with permanent four-wheel drive.

In June 1989, Suzuki introduced their first three-box sedan since the discontinuation of the Fronte 800 in 1969. Sold as the "Cultus Esteem" in Japan, it was also available with a larger 1.6-liter engine never offered in the hatchbacks. In the Japanese market, the 1.3-liter single-cam engine was changed to a 16-valve version in July 1990, which increased power to 82 PS (81 hp; 60 kW). Suzuki facelifted the Cultus in July 1991 for the 1992 model year. The update involved the relocation of the rear license plate to the rear bumper from in between the tail lamps. The gap vacated by the license plate was filled in with either a black plastic panel or translucent red perspex panel integrating with the tail lamps. At the front, Suzuki revised the bumper's airdam, and inside, the interior was substantially re-designed. In the Japanese market, the Cultus Esteem's carburetted 1.6-liter engine was replaced by a single-point fuel injection 1.5-liter G15A engine with 91 PS (90 hp; 67 kW), to fit a lower tax category. The single-cam 1.3 was also updated with fuel injection in July 1991, although its power remained 82 PS (81 hp; 60 kW).

All Swifts (export models) got a redesigned front and rear fascia as well as a new dashboard. The 1.0-liter three-cylinder engine received a new cylinder head assembly: the engine of the previous generation used the same block and corresponding components but featured a head with valves in a V-formation straddling a single camshaft with rocker arms on shafts, whereas now the cylinder head assumed a much slimmer profile, owing to the valves now being in a vertical, inline configuration, actuated by inverted buckets also serving as hydraulic valve lash adjusters, all underneath a single overhead camshaft.

The first European-built model was a "Suzuki Swift" manufactured in September 1992 in Esztergom, Hungary. Updates in 1996 followed, and model year 2000 modifications included a version fitted with the same Suzuki four-wheel drive system that had been available in the Japanese market until February 1996 and badged as the "Subaru Justy". The last modifications were made on the European Gen II from model year 2002 but only for the Hungarian market, the 1.3-liter engine was also changed to 16-valve version and produces 85 PS (84 hp; 63 kW). The production of the three-door models ended in September 2002. In the same year, in December, the four-door sedan version was also discontinued. The last variation available was a five-door version, which was offered until March 2003.

In Ecuador, the local Aymesa plant assembled some versions of this vehicle. The three-door version was called Suzuki "Forsa II", while the four-door sedan version was badged "Chevrolet Swift". In 1999, General Motors de Ecuador took over AYMESA's production of General Motors vehicles, including Suzuki-based ones. Production of the sedan ended about 1996, while the hatchback version continued to being produced until 2003 at least and it was badged as "Chevrolet Forsa" in latter years. These were powered by the 67 PS (66 hp; 49 kW) 1.3-liter four. Cultus variants were available in Colombia from 1991 until 2004, where it was called the Chevrolet Swift. They were assembled by GM-Colmotores in Bogotá. A stripped-down version of the 1.3-liter Swift sedan was also marketed as the "Suzuki Taxi".

The hatchback was sold in Indonesia as the "Forsa Amenity" from 1990 until 1992, and, after a facelift, simply as the "Eleny" from 1992 until 1994. The sedan arrived in 1991 and marketed as the "Forsa Esteem", although the "Forsa" portion was eventually dropped just like the hatchback in the facelift. Initially only a carburetted, uncatalyzed version of the 1298 cc G13BA 8-valve engine with 71 PS (70 hp; 52 kW) at 6000 rpm was available. Power claimed later decreased to 67 PS (66 hp; 49 kW) in the facelifted version. The sedan and five-door hatchback were assembled locally with CKD kits in Indonesia, while a small number of three-door hatchbacks were imported fully built-up from Japan. From 1992 there was also a "Marissa Haque Limited Edition" of the sedan with power steering, front fog lamps, body-colored bumpers, a rear spoilers, and a number of stickers. The Esteem sedan was also available with a 92 PS (91 hp; 68 kW) carburetted 1.6-liter G16A 16-valve engine option after the facelift, sold as the Esteem GT. The hatchbacks were discontinued in 1994, followed by the sedan in 1996.

In New Zealand, the second generation Swift and Barina diverged somewhat when it arrived in March 1989. The GM-badged car, being sold mainly on its low price to a different kind of clientele than Suzuki's, often as a second car, received a lower price and equipment levels than its Suzuki sibling. The costlier GTi model was also reserved for Suzuki.

In China, the Cultus was known as the Suzuki Lingyang and was built by Chang'an. Production started in 1999 and ended in early 2015. The only engine choice was the 1.3-liter G13BB engine mated to a 5-speed manual gearbox. The Lingyang was facelifted in 2007, 2010 and 2012.

In Japan, the Cultus was gradually replaced by the slightly larger Cultus Crescent (Baleno or Esteem elsewhere) in 1995. However in May 1998, the hatchback was renamed to "Cultus M" as the Cultus Crescent dropped the "Crescent" suffix. It continued to be available as one of the cheapest non-kei car at that time. The hatchback was available until 2000, replaced by the Ignis based-Swift.

The vehicle entered Pakistani market in 1989 with units imported from Japan, it was only available in sedan form as Swift Sedan and powered by a 1.0-liter engine producing 50 PS (49 hp; 37 kW). In 1991, Pak Suzuki started local production for the domestic market and renamed to "Suzuki Margalla". It gained a bigger 1.3-liter four-cylinder engine and paired with a 5-speed manual transmission. The production continued until 1998 when it was succeeded by Suzuki Baleno sedan. Almost two years later, the production returned in 2000 as a 5-door hatchback and marketed as Suzuki Cultus. It had a three-cylinder 1.0-liter engine from the imported 1989–1991 Swift Sedan. In 2002, factory fitted CNG-powered option was launched along with several improvements, followed by another changes in 2005. Major facelift occurred in 2007 with new fuel injected 1.0-liter four-cylinder engine, new bumpers and seat upholstery with broader head rests. It continued to be produced until late 2016, with sales ended on 1 February 2017.

=== Names in different markets ===
	Nameplate	Market	Body			
	Nameplate	Market	2-dr Cv	3-dr HB	4-dr Sd	5-dr HB
1988–1994	Holden Barina (Note: MF, MH: only generations of 'Cultus-derived' Barina)	Australia; New Zealand		X		X
1988–1999	Suzuki Swift	Australia		X	X	X
1989–1994	Geo Metro/Chevrolet Metro (Note: Geo branded models in US after 1989, in Canada after 1992.)	N. America	X	X	X	X
1989–1994	Pontiac Firefly	Canada	X	X	X	X
1989–1994	Suzuki Swift	N. America		X	X (Note: Suzuki-branded 5 door was offered in 1989 model year only, Suzuki-branded sedan beginning in 1990.)	X
1989–2003	Suzuki Cultus	Japan	X	X	X	X
1989–2004	Suzuki Swift (Note: Manufactured at Magyar Suzuki)	Europe	X	X	X	X
1990–1994	Maruti 1000	India			X	
1991–1996	Suzuki Forsa Amenity/Eleny/Esteem	Indonesia		X	X	X
1991–2004	Chevrolet Swift	Colombia (Note: Imported to Colombia.)		X	X	
1992–2003	Suzuki/Chevrolet Forsa	Ecuador		X		
1992–1996	Chevrolet Swift	Ecuador			X	
1994–2010	Maruti Suzuki Esteem	India			X	
1995–2003	Subaru Justy	Europe		X		X
1999–2015	Changan Suzuki Lingyang	China			X	
1991–1998; 2000–2016	Suzuki Margalla/Cultus (Note: Manufactured at Pak Suzuki Motors.)	Pakistan			X	X

=== Gallery ===
==== Cultus/Swift ====
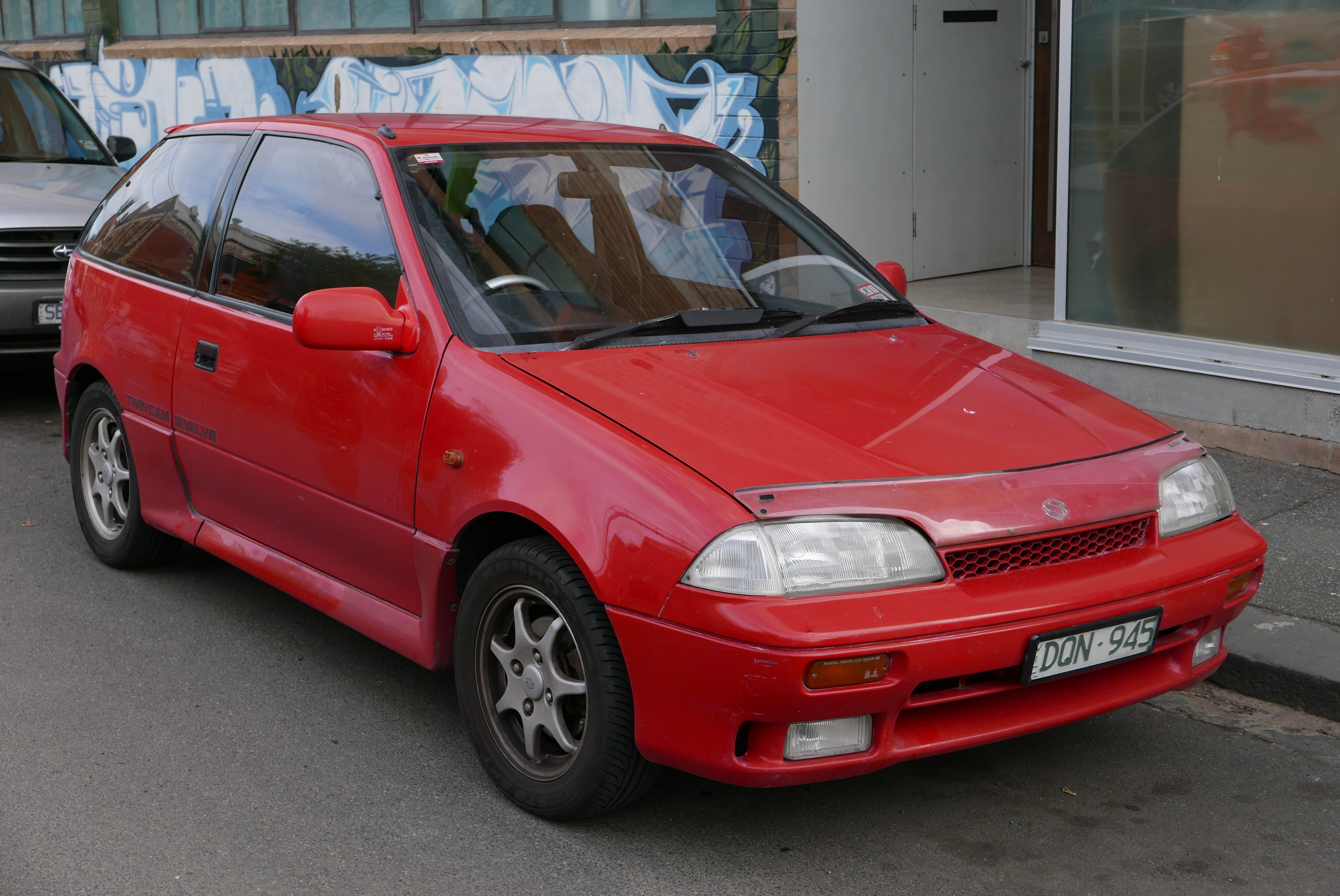
Suzuki Swift GTi (pre-facelift, Australia)

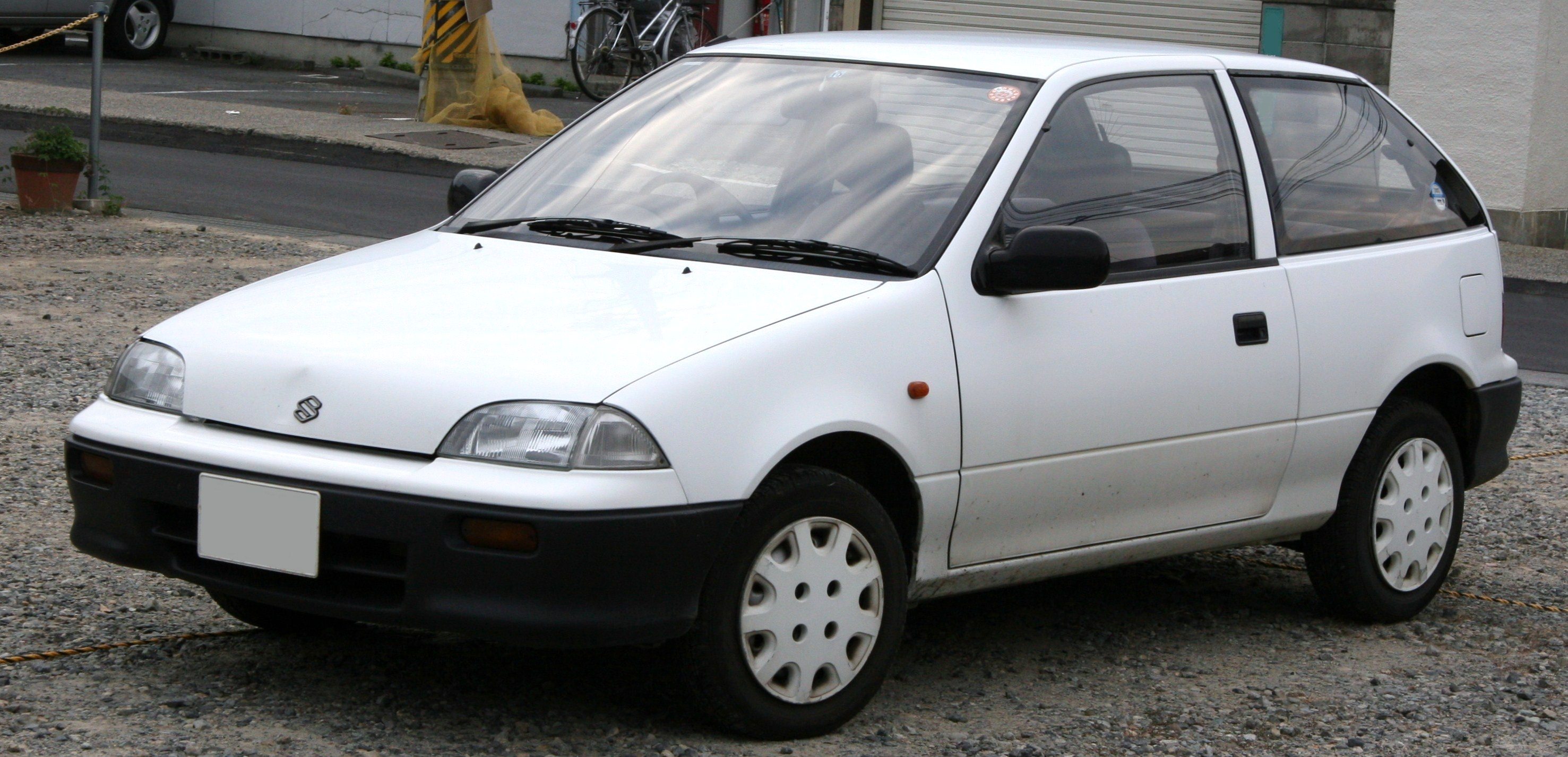
Suzuki Cultus 3-door hatchback (first facelift, Japan)

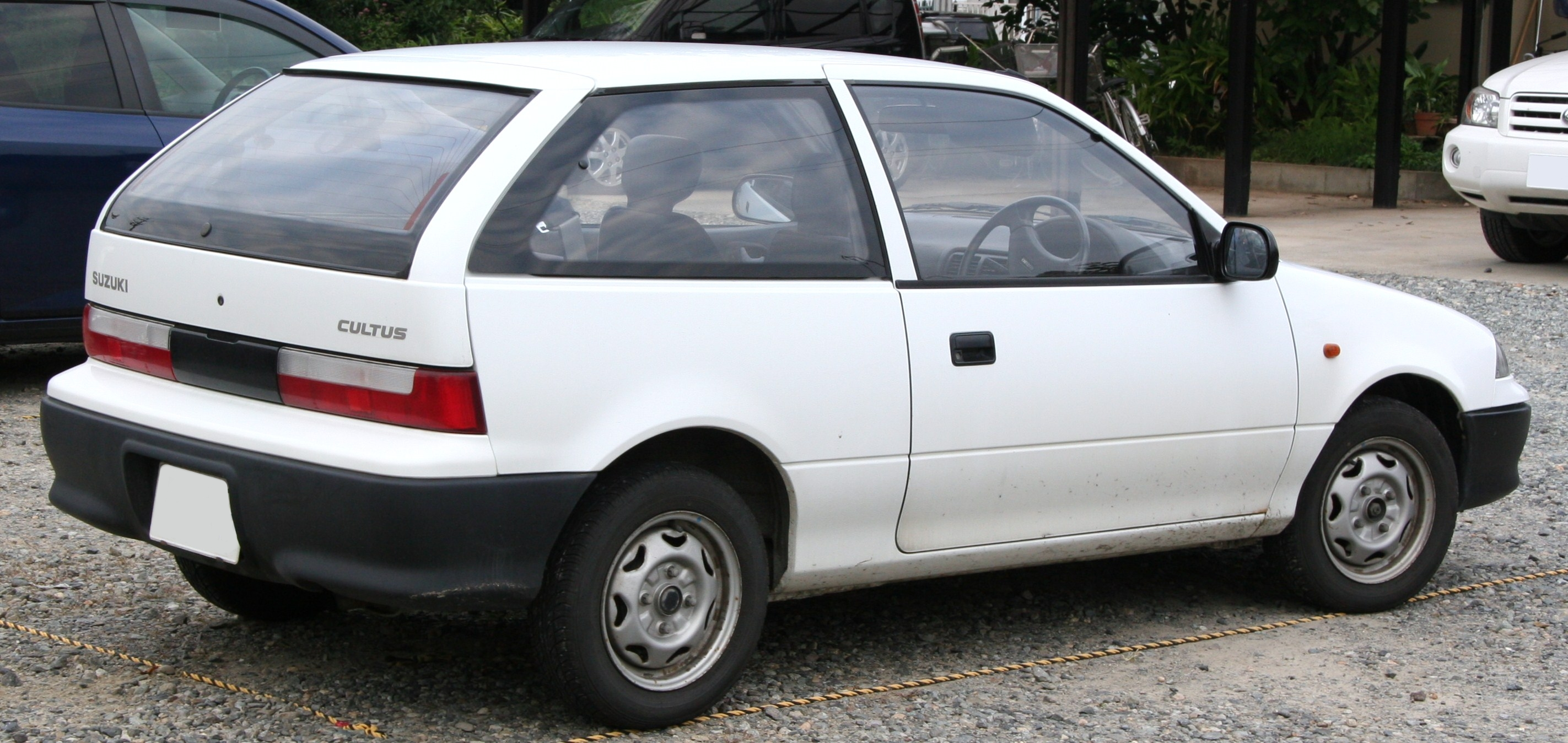
Suzuki Cultus 3-door hatchback (first facelift, Japan)

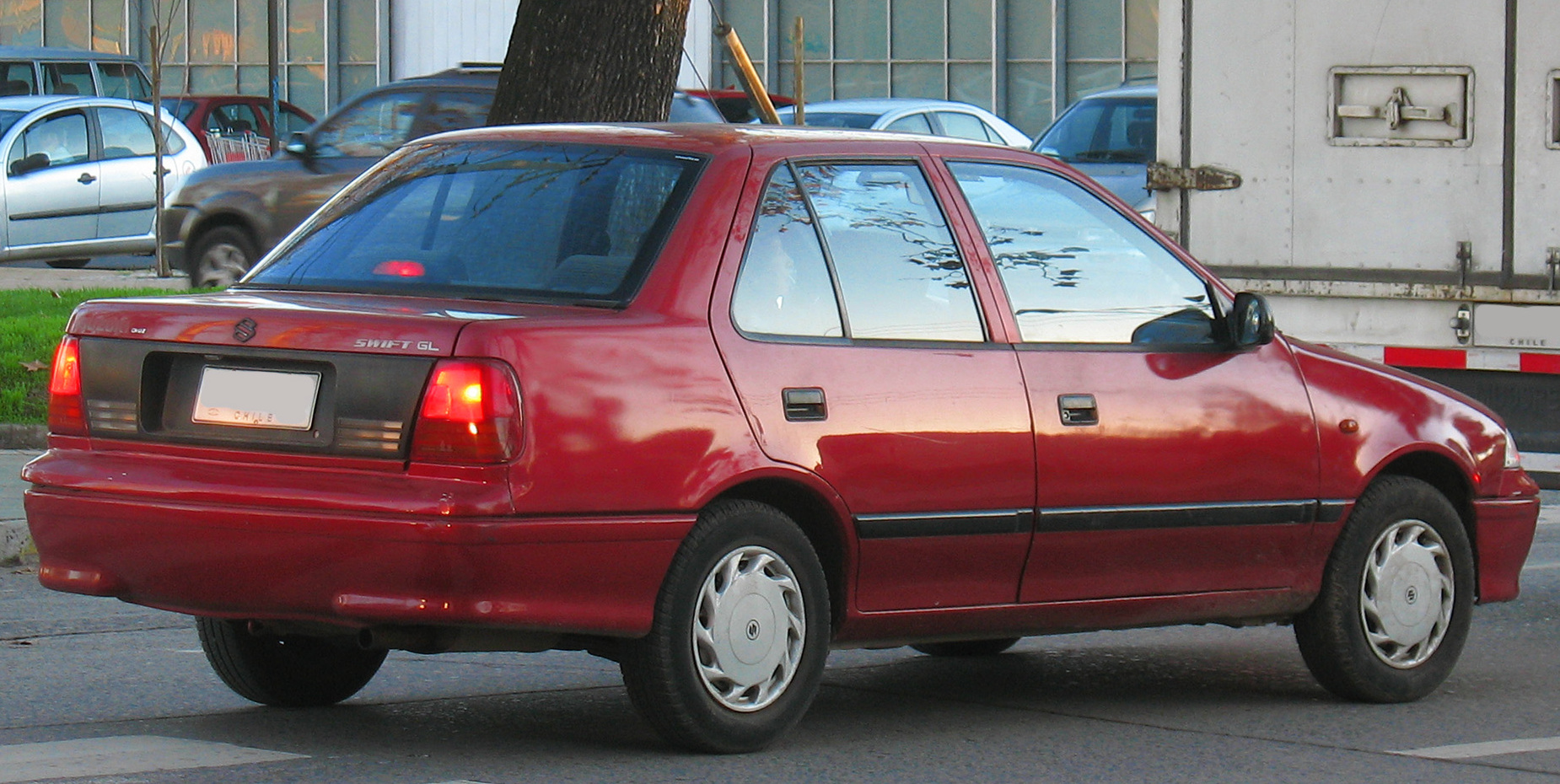
Suzuki Swift 1.3 GL sedan (first facelift, Europe)

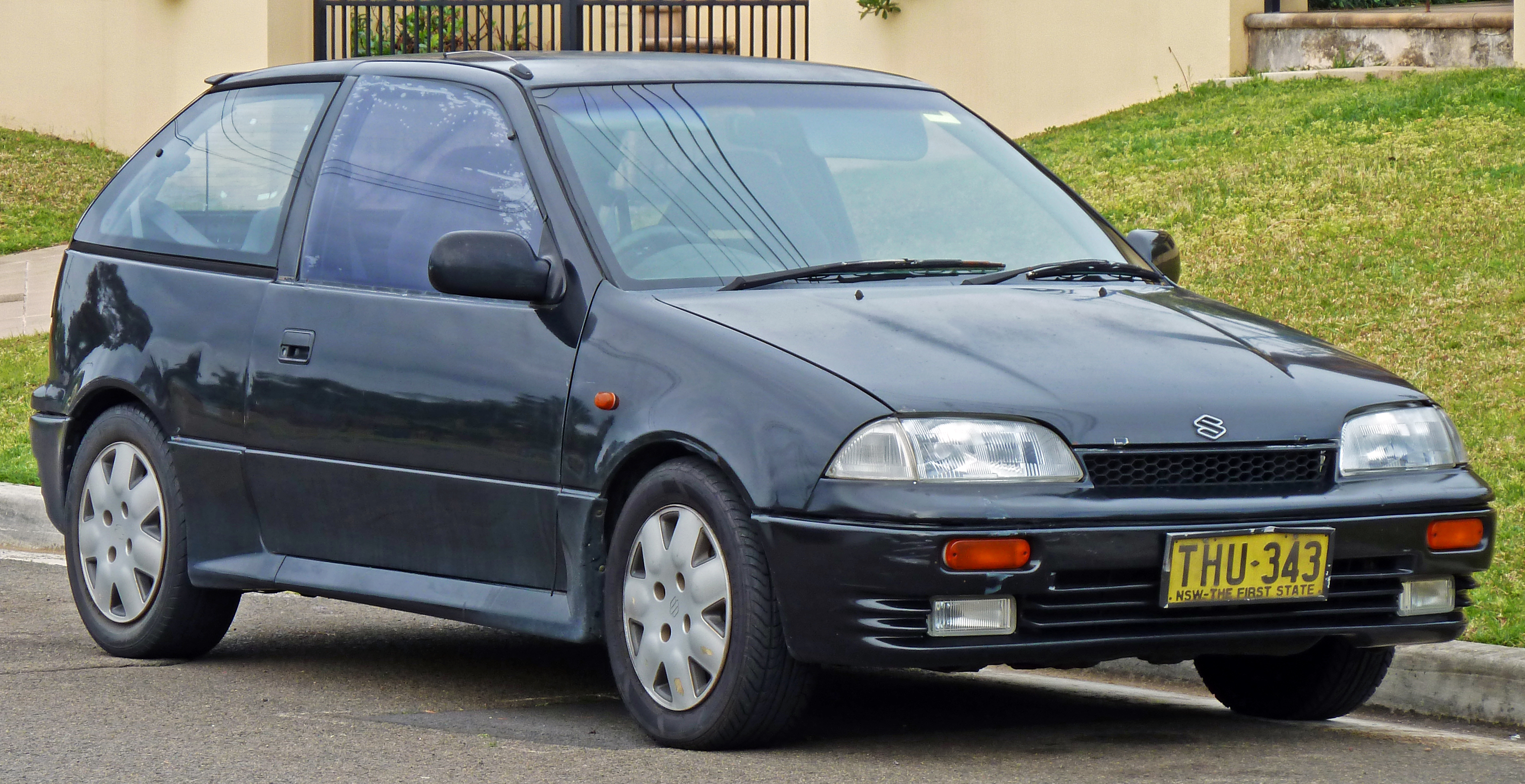
Suzuki Swift GTi 3-door hatchback (facelift, Australia)

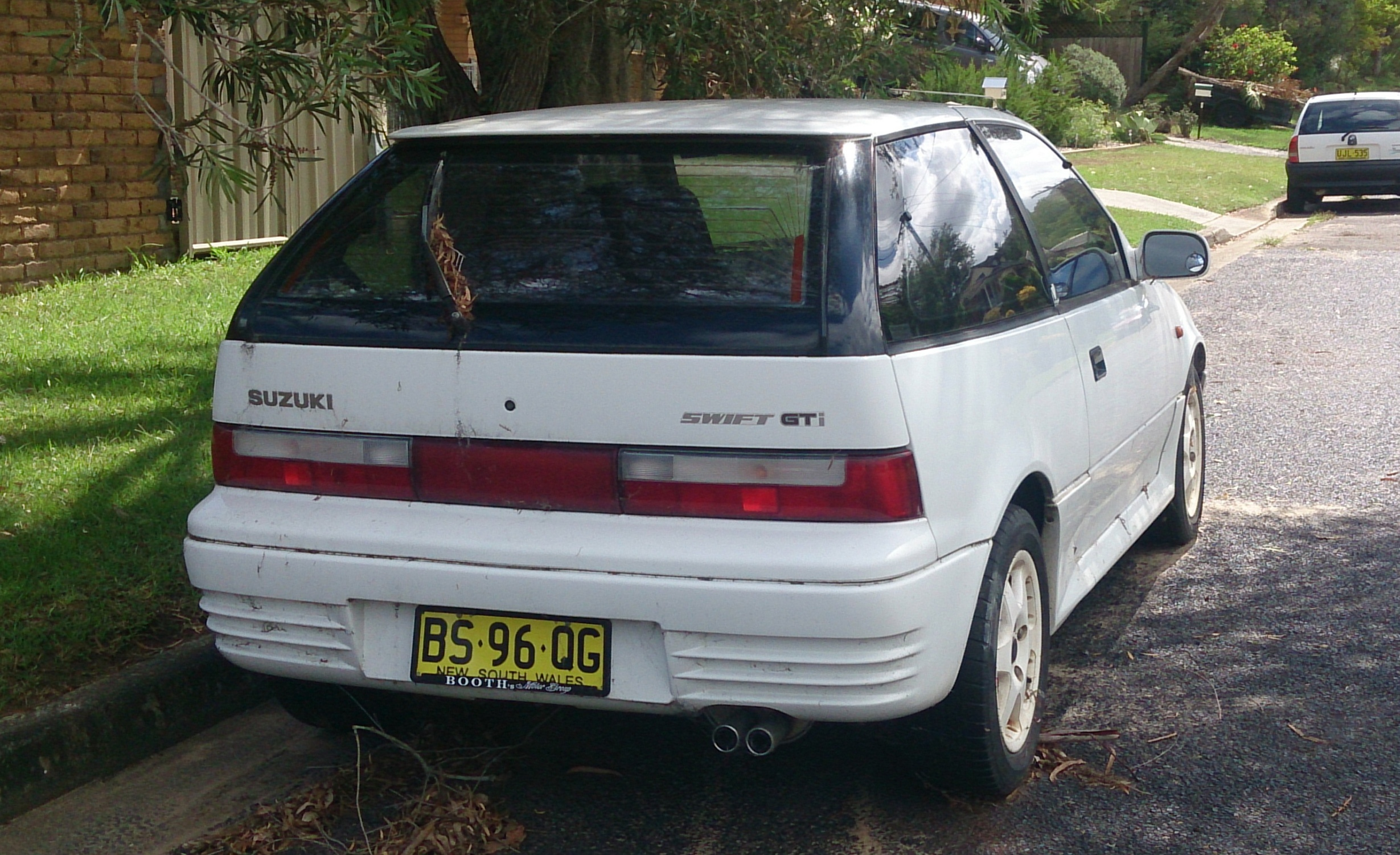
Suzuki Swift GTi 3-door hatchback (facelift, Australia)

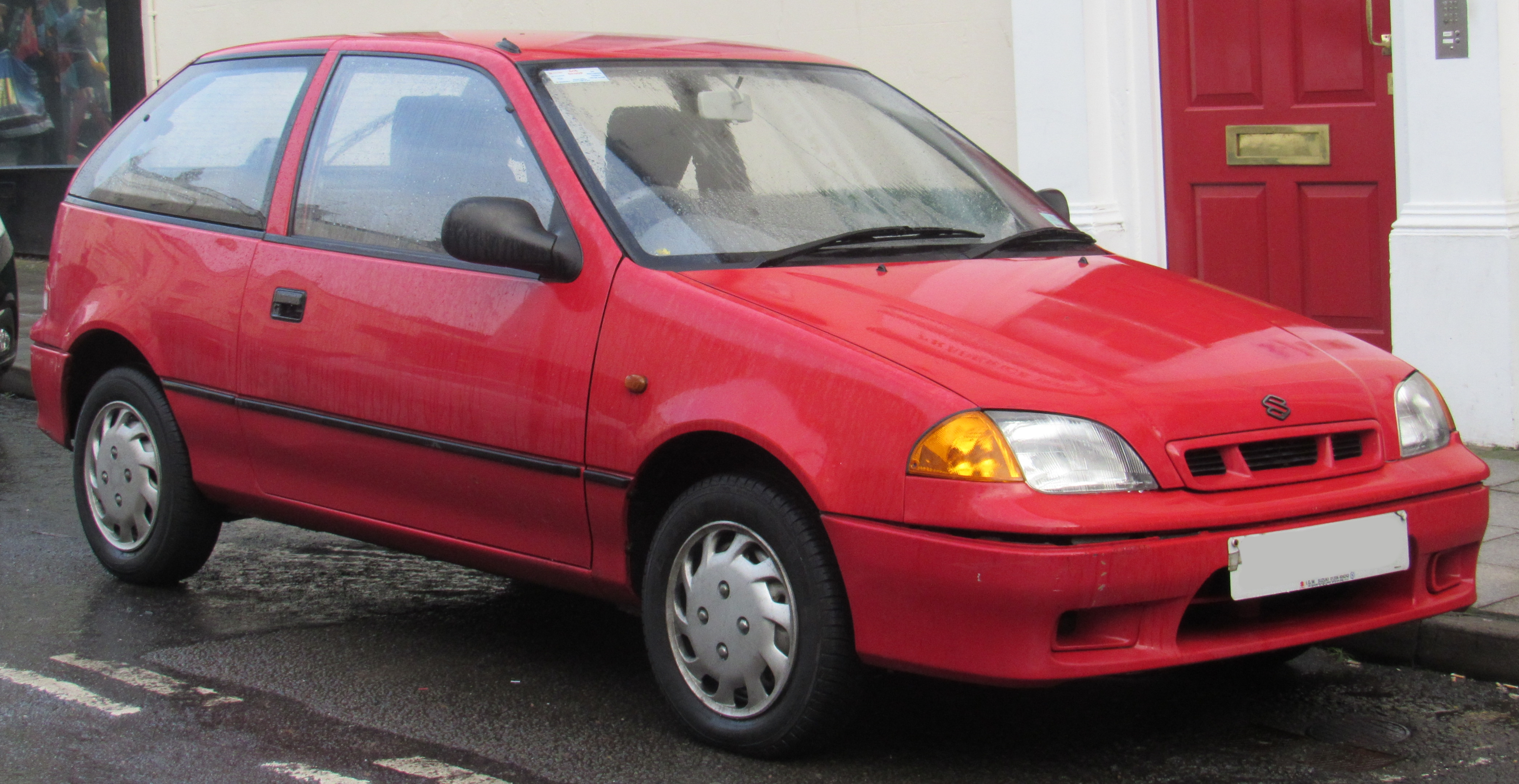
Suzuki Swift GLS 3-door hatchback (second facelift, UK)

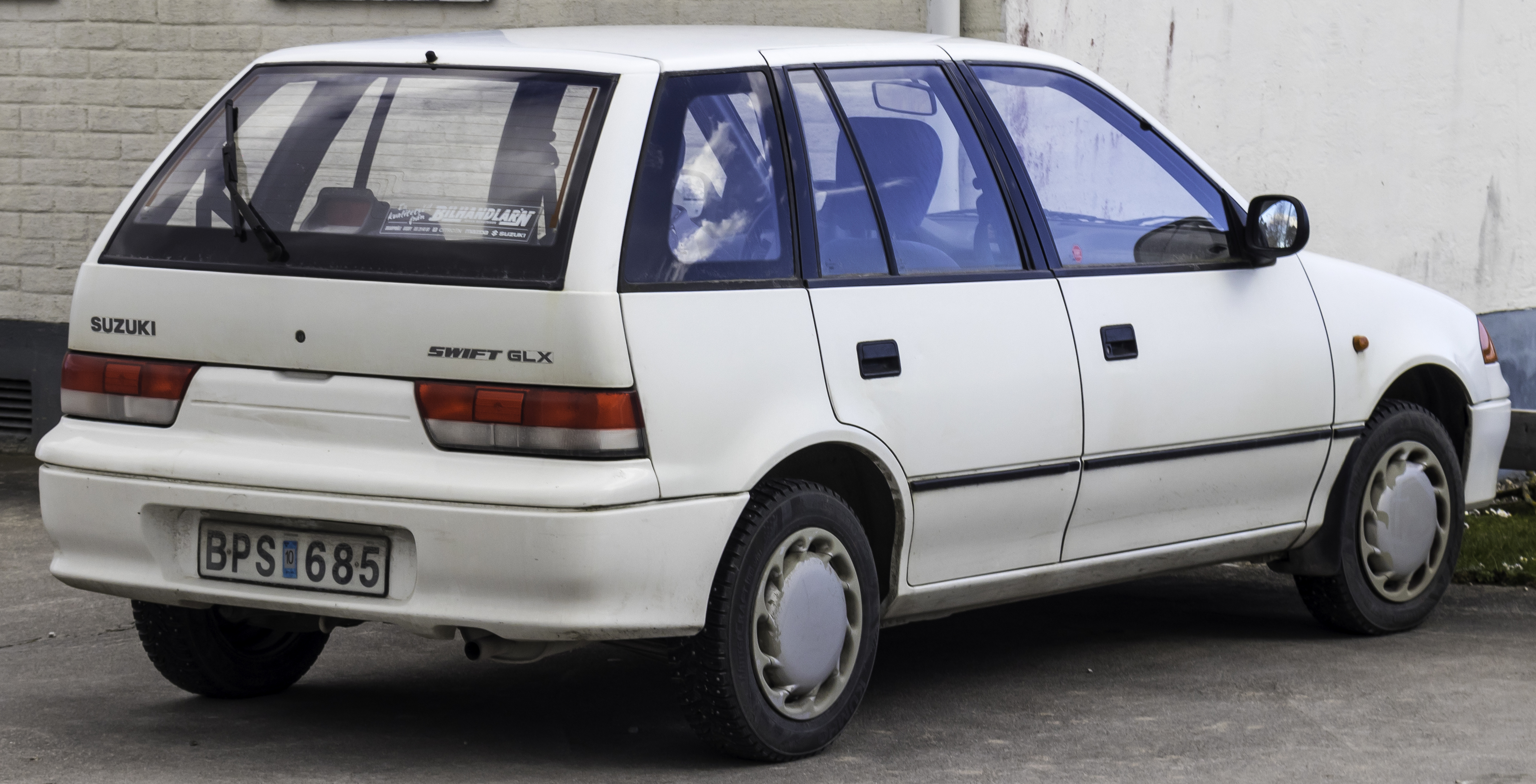
Suzuki Swift GLX 5-door hatchback (second facelift, Europe)

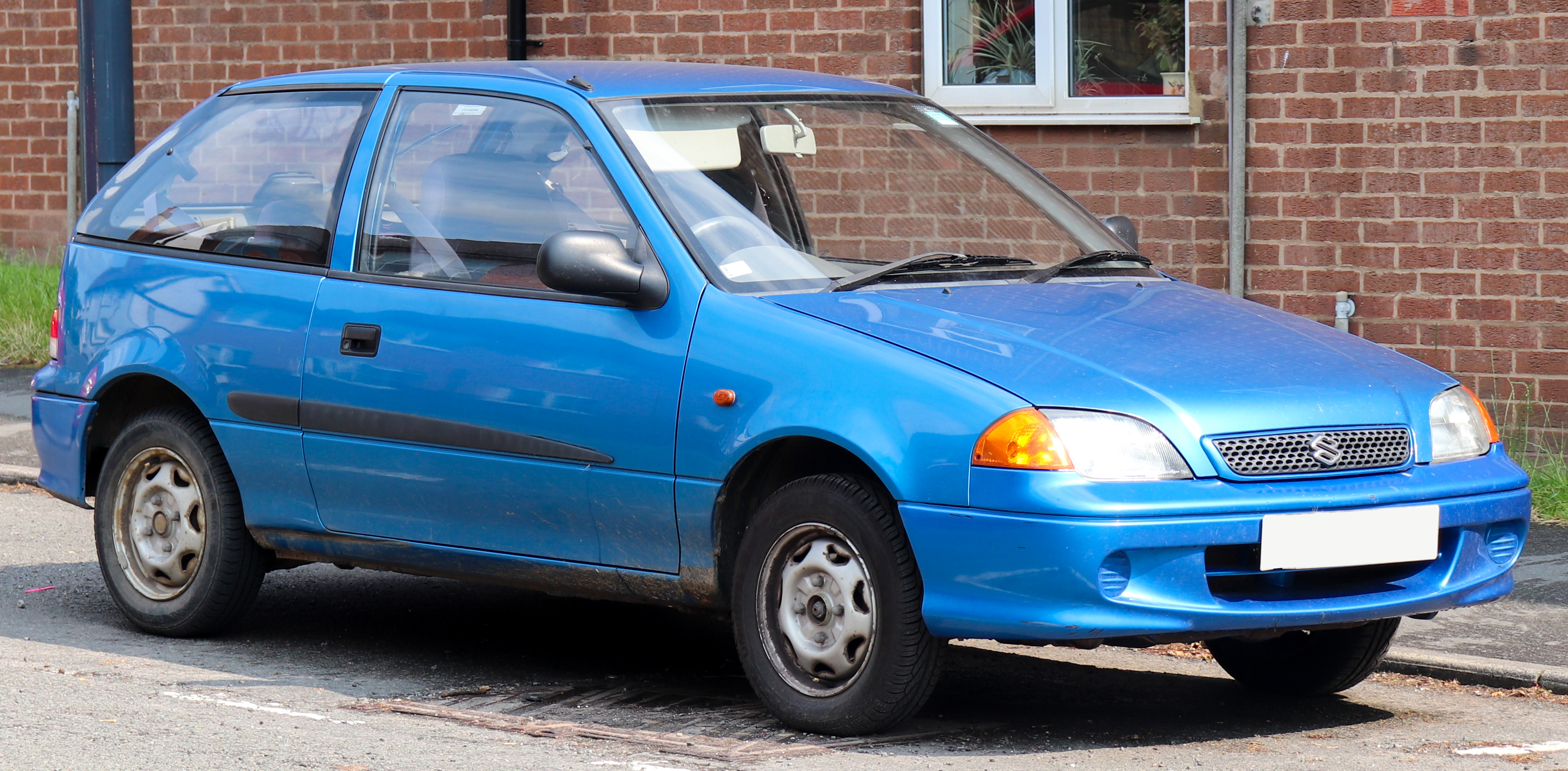
Suzuki Swift GLS 3-door hatchback (third facelift, UK)

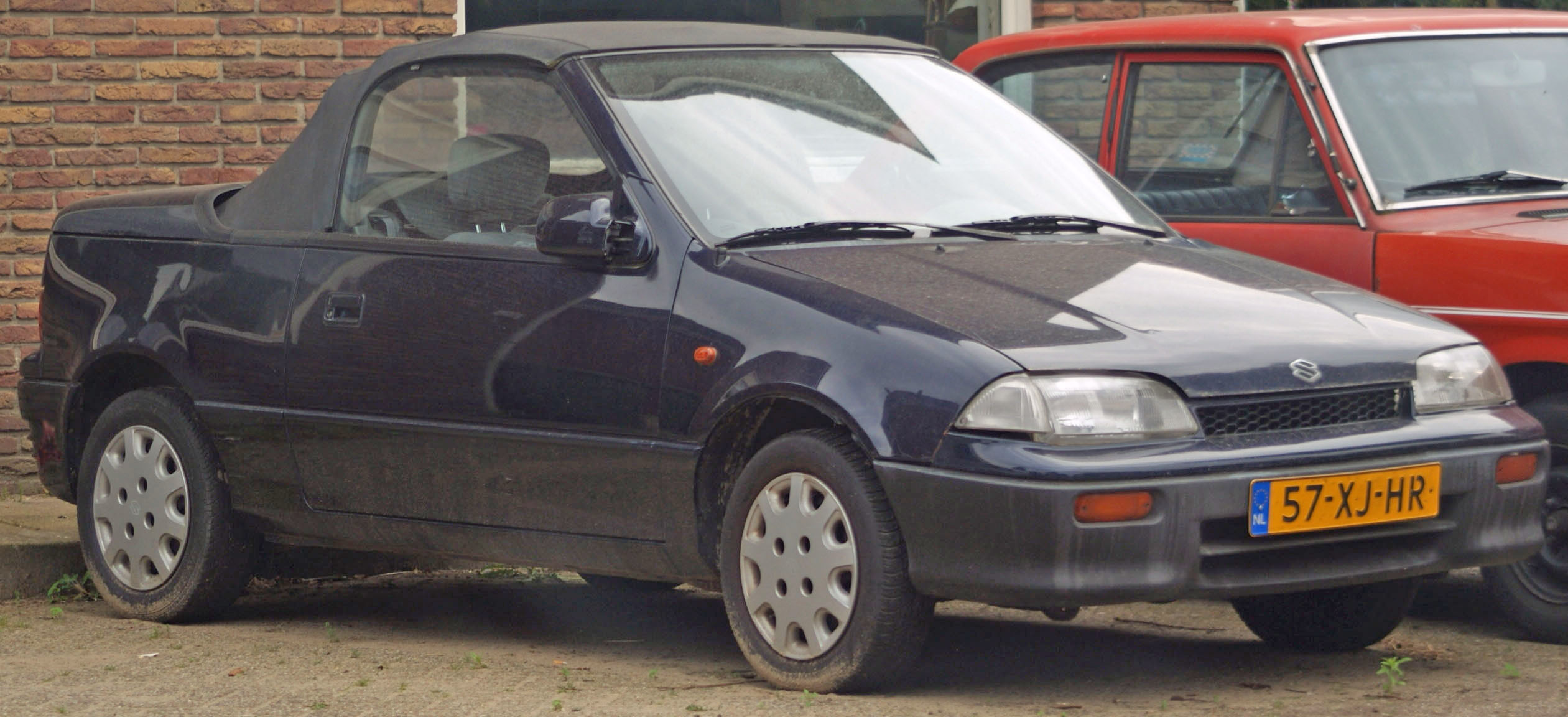
Suzuki Swift cabriolet (Europe)

Lingyang

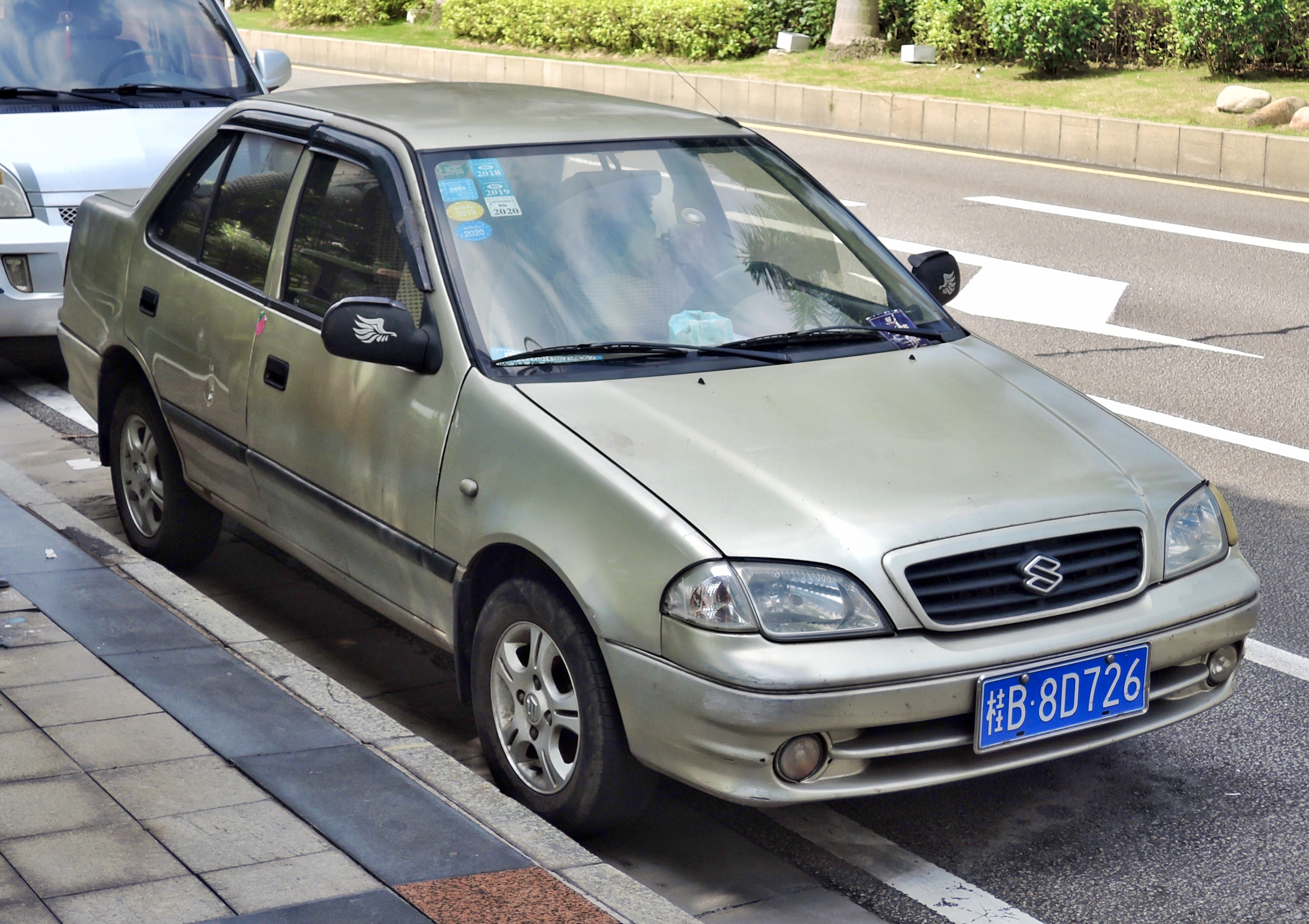
Changan Suzuki Lingyang (pre-facelift, China)

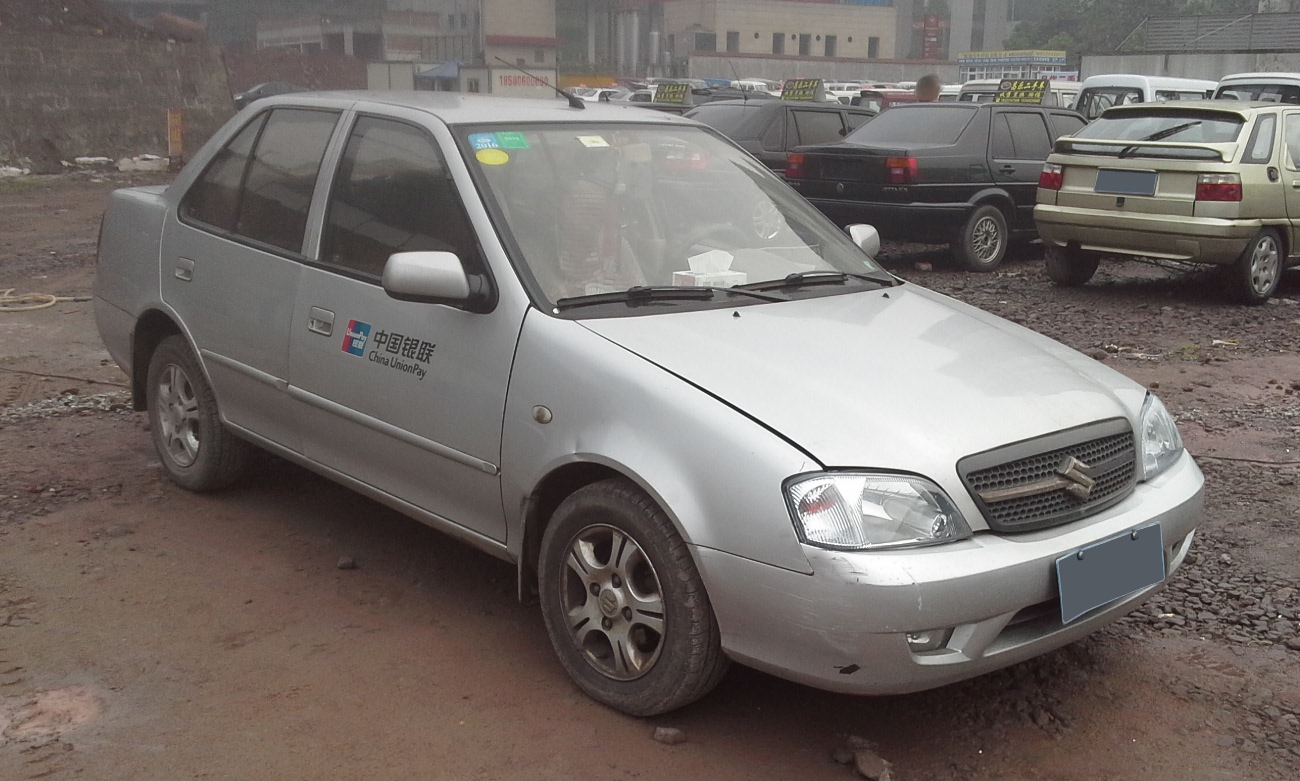
Changan Suzuki Lingyang (first facelift, China)

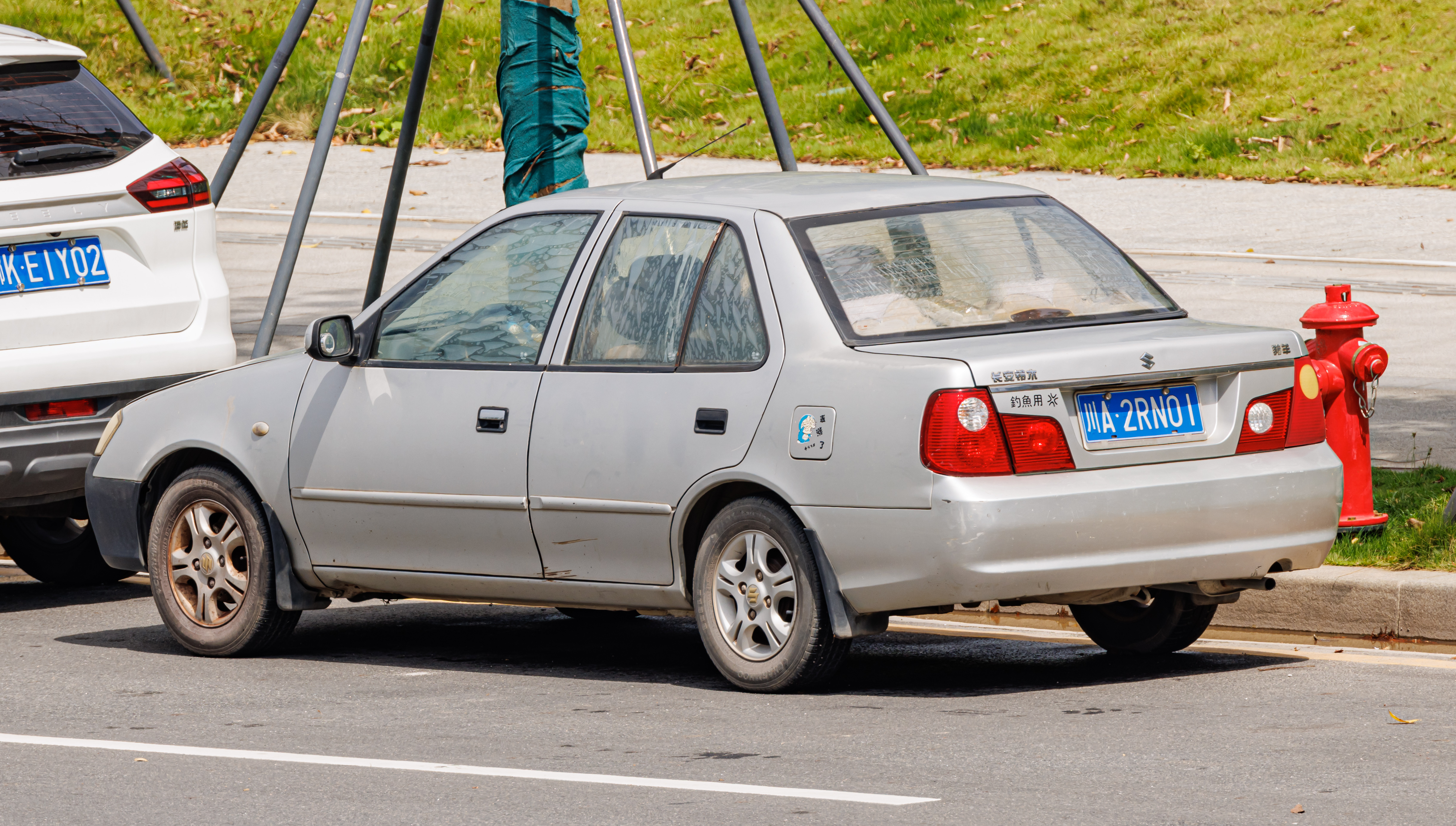
Changan Suzuki Lingyang (first facelift, China

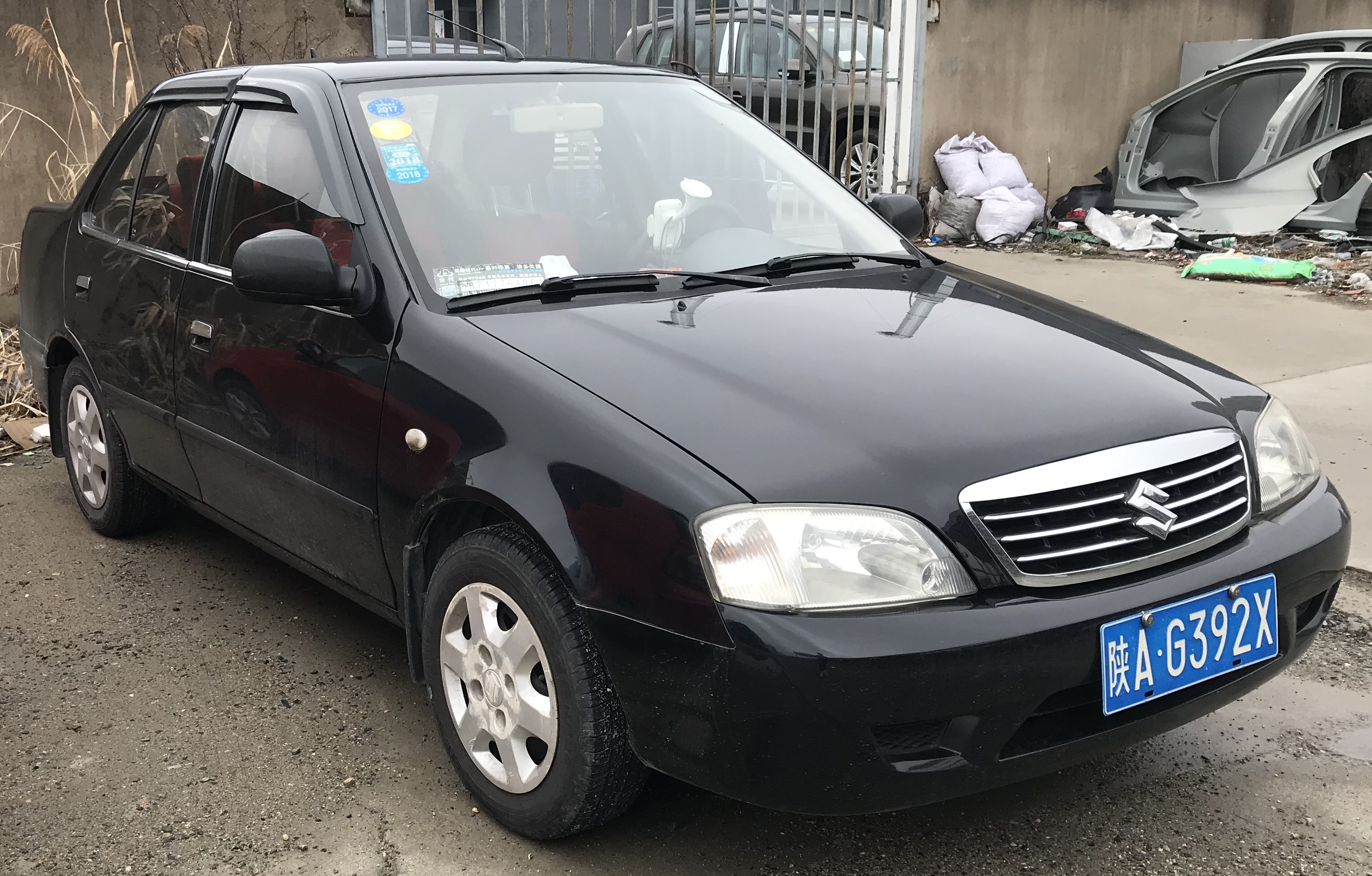
Changan Suzuki Lingyang (second facelift, China)

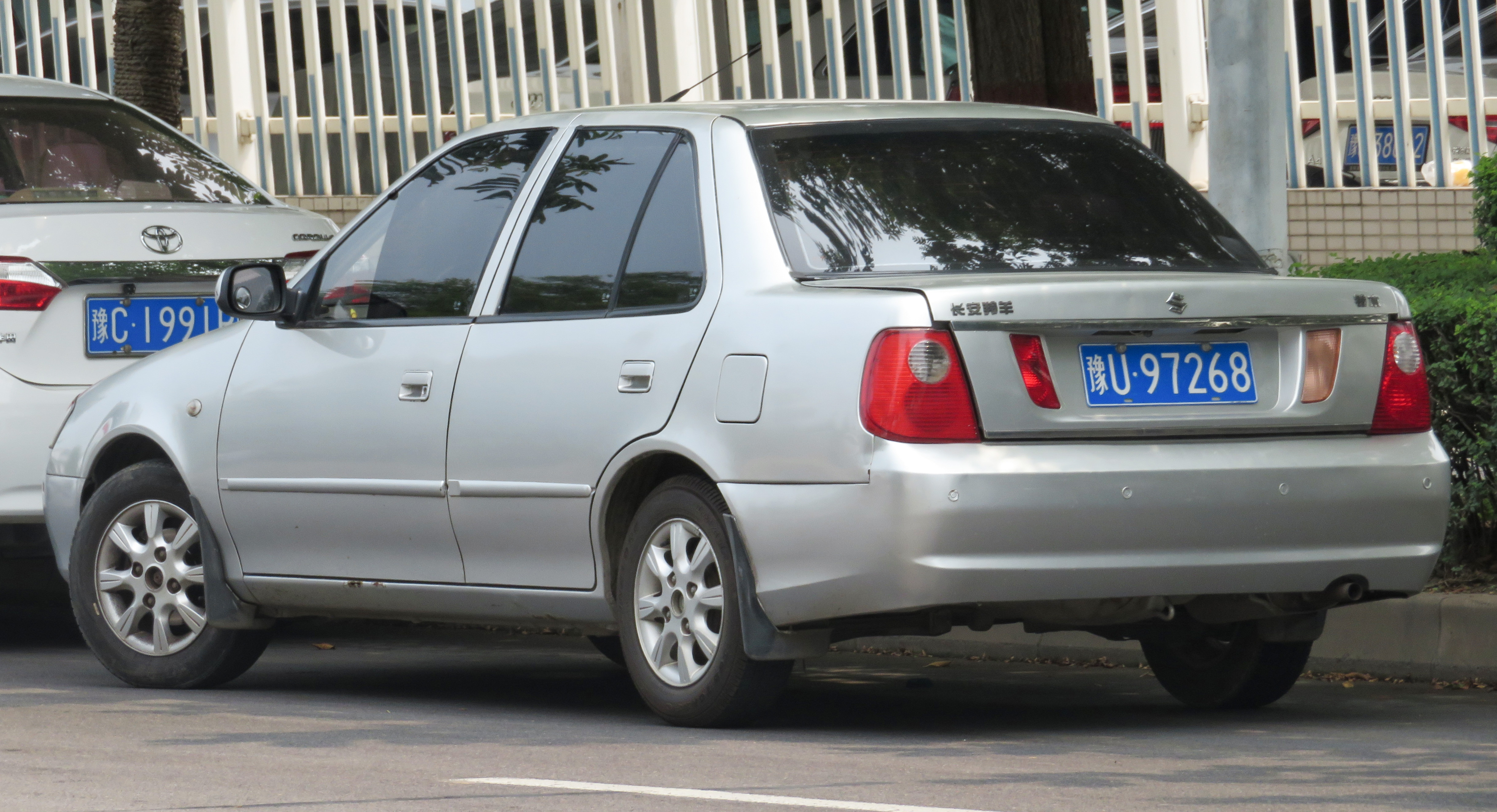
Changan Suzuki Lingyang (second facelift, China)

Rebadge

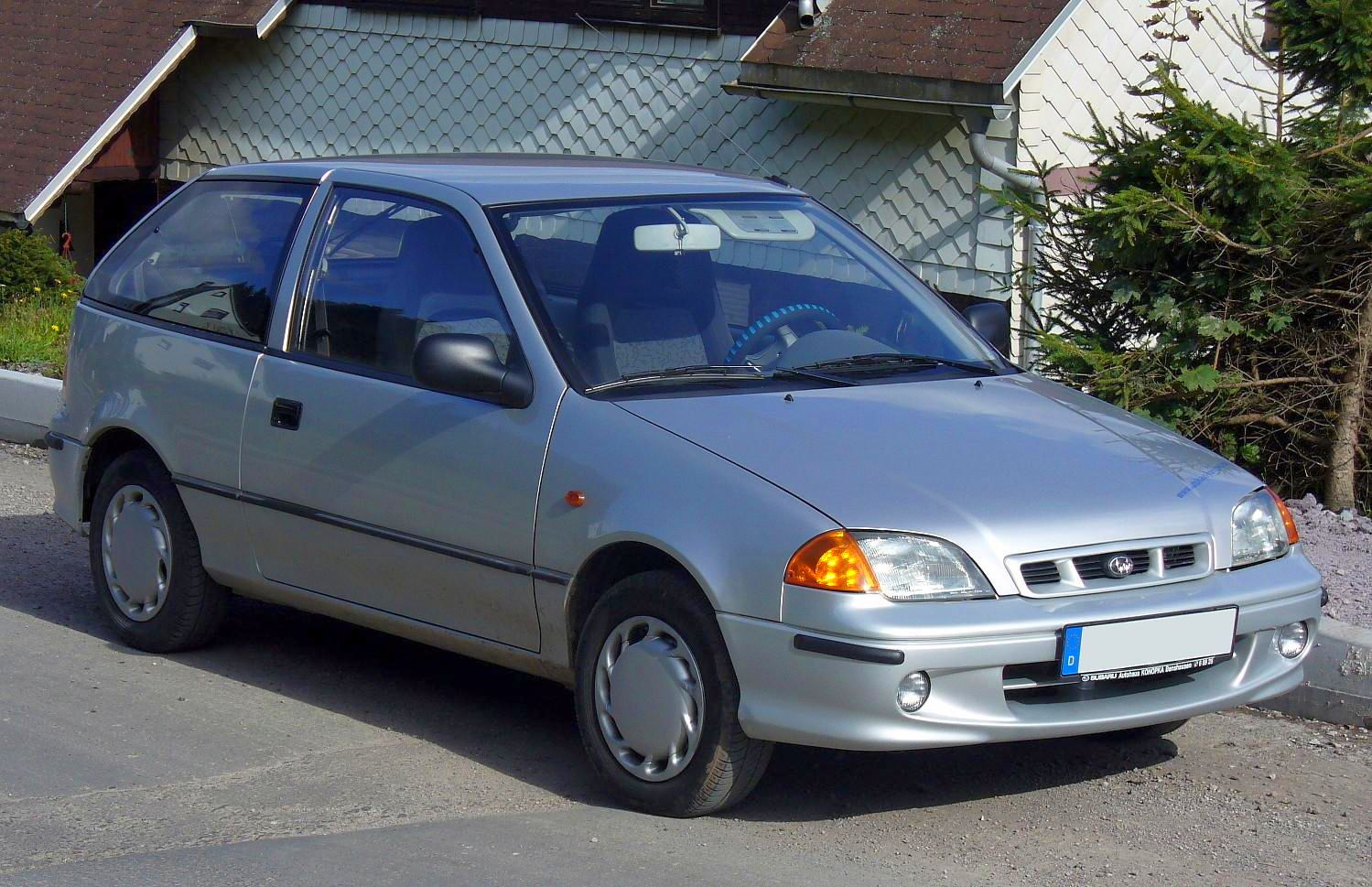
Subaru Justy 3-door hatchback (facelift, Europe)

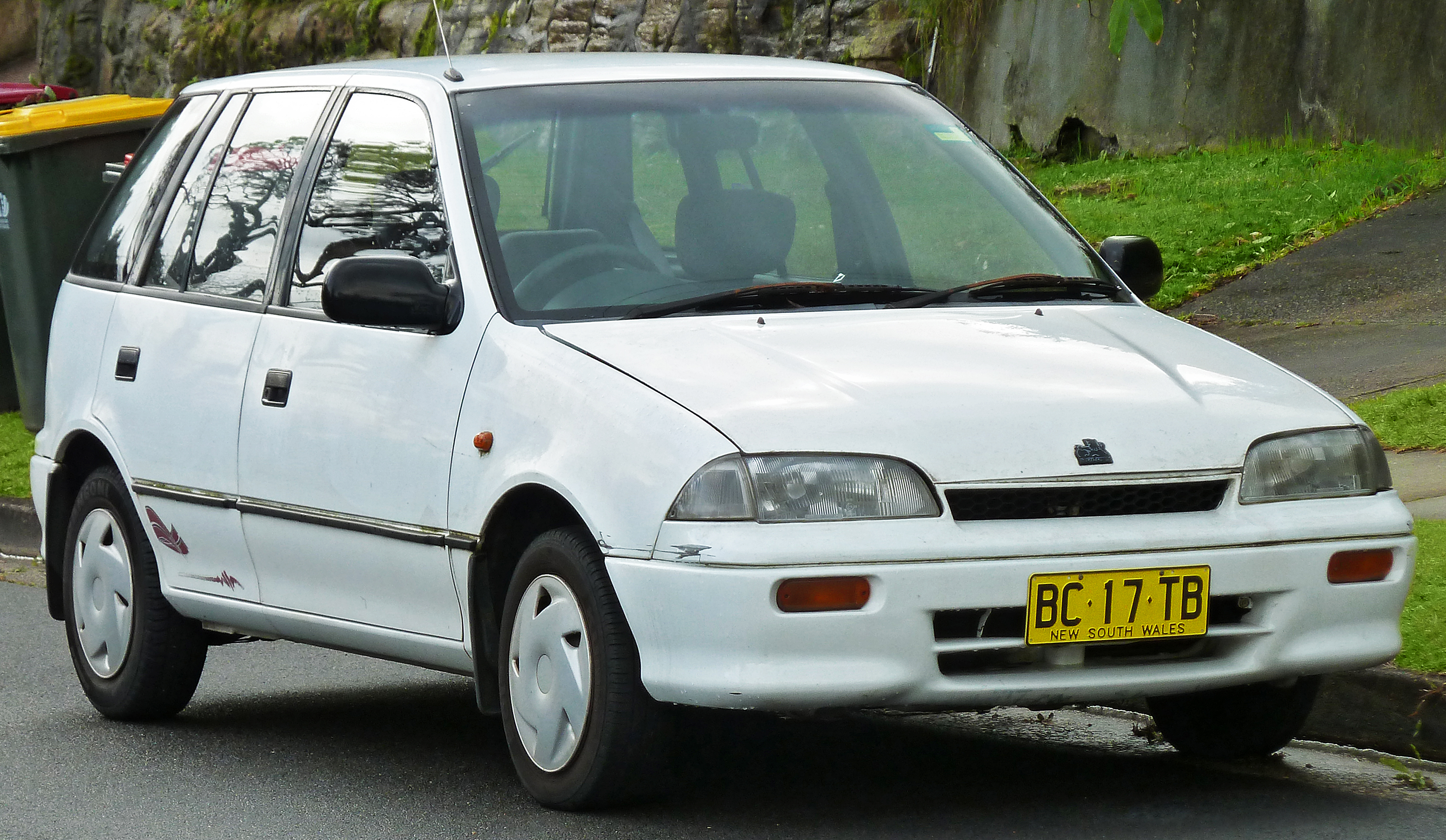
Holden Barina 5-door (facelift, Australia)

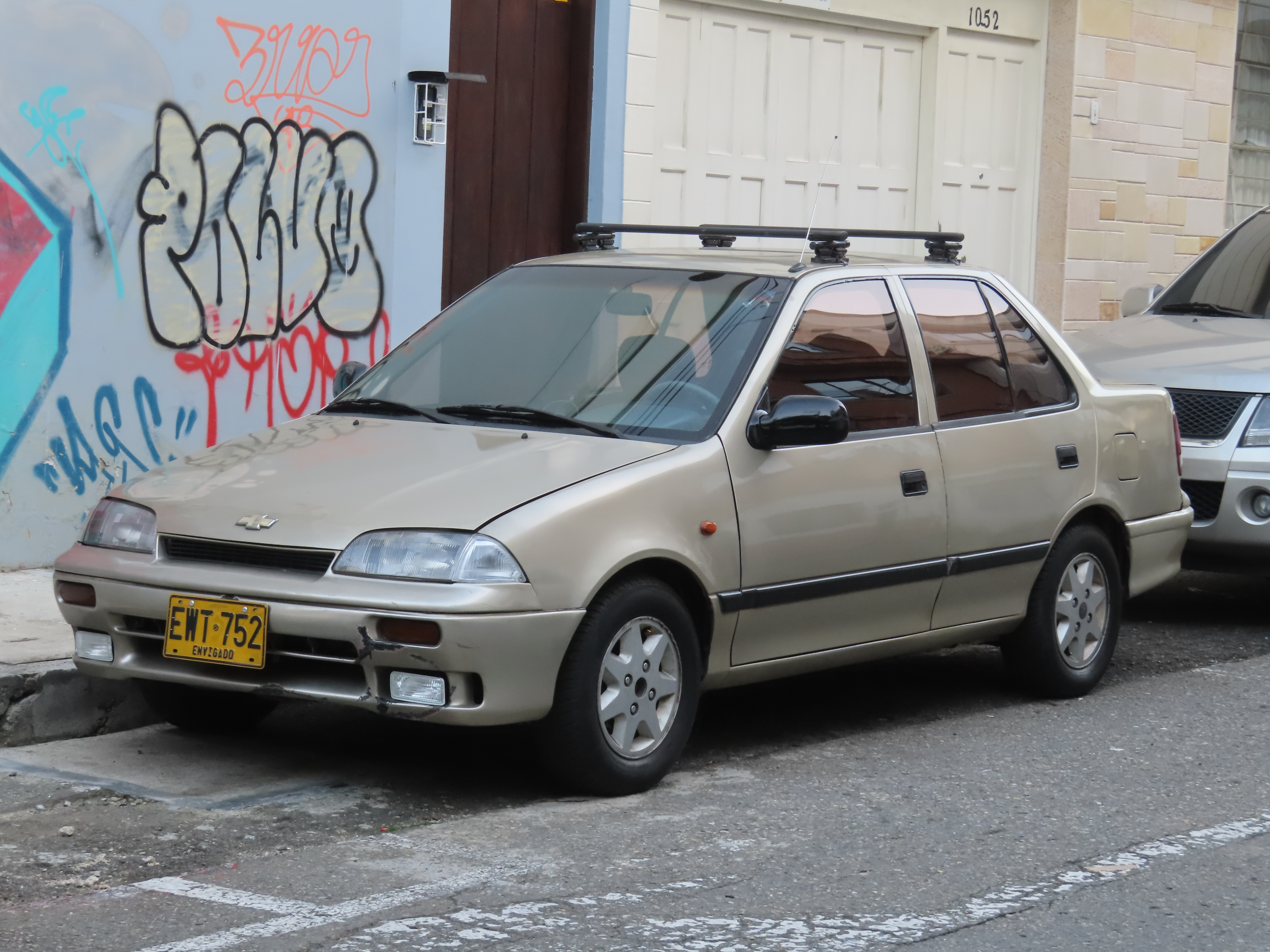
Chevrolet Swift sedan (pre-facelift, Colombia)

=== North America ===
==== Swift ====
Following limited 1985–1988 sales of the Forsa, the nameplate was changed to Suzuki Swift. The Swift was available as a three-door GTi and five-door GLX hatchback. Designed by General Motors, the design echoed that of the contemporary Chevrolet Cavalier and Pontiac Sunfire. A four-door sedan followed in 1990 – imported from Japan. For Swifts in North America, the 1.0-liter three-cylinder was only available in Canada where it was sold from 1992 to 1994. In 1990, the GLX was dropped; an inexpensive GA 3-door was added as were GA, GL and GS four-door sedan. At the same time, the GTi name was changed to GT because of an out-of-court settlement with Volkswagen of America over their similarly named GTI. The Swift nameplate moved on to separate from the Cultus, eventually being placed on the North American "third generation" model.

The Swift featured a 993 cc inline three-cylinder engine producing 56 PS (55 hp; 41 kW). The G10 engine weighed 63 kg (139 lb) and was the same as used in the Geo Metro and other North American iterations. Other engine configurations included a carbureted or fuel injected SOHC eight-valve 1.3-liter G13. Trim levels included the 1.0 GA and the 1.0 GL. The GA model included plastic wheelcovers, four-speed gearbox and cloth trim. The GL model included more equipment such as a five-speed gearbox, alloy wheels, a sunroof, and air conditioning in some markets.

With the first generation, Suzuki marketed the Swift GTi with the G13B engine – a DOHC 16 valve, 1.3-liter, inline four-cylinder engine with an aluminum block and cylinder head, forged steel crankshaft and connecting rods, and cast aluminum high compression pistons (10:1 compression ratio). Its power output is 101 PS (100 hp; 74 kW).

The second generation received a modest restyle and other production changes in 1992, including changes to the bumpers, tail lights and interior. GT/GTi versions were equipped with larger sway-bars, and the camshafts were now solid. Production for the North American market ended in 1994. From 1995 onward, the redesigned North American-exclusive Suzuki Swift was built at CAMI Automotive, receiving all the modifications of its Pontiac and Geo/Chevrolet siblings – only ever available in the three-door body style, however.

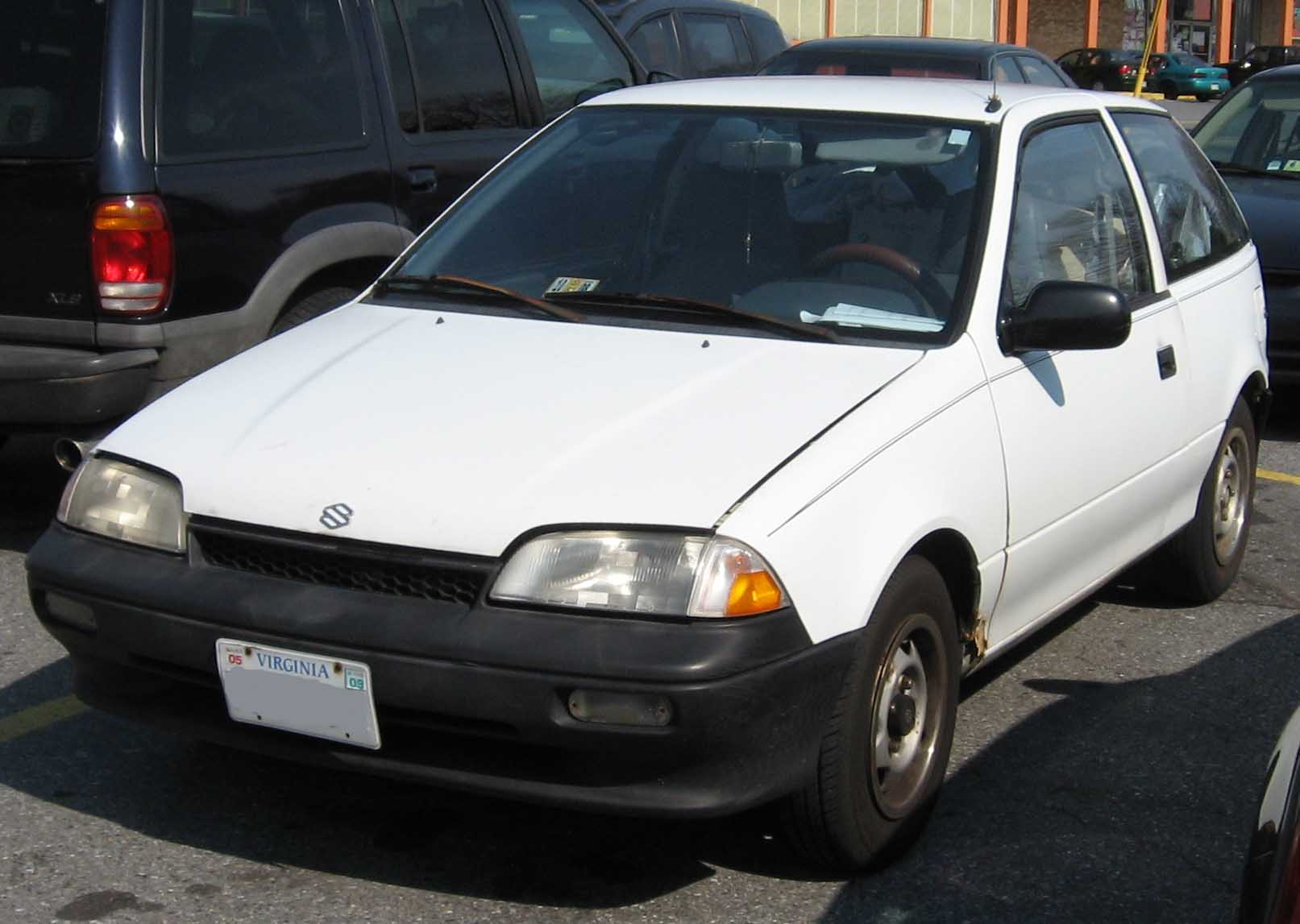
1989–1991 model year Suzuki Swift 3-door hatchback (US)

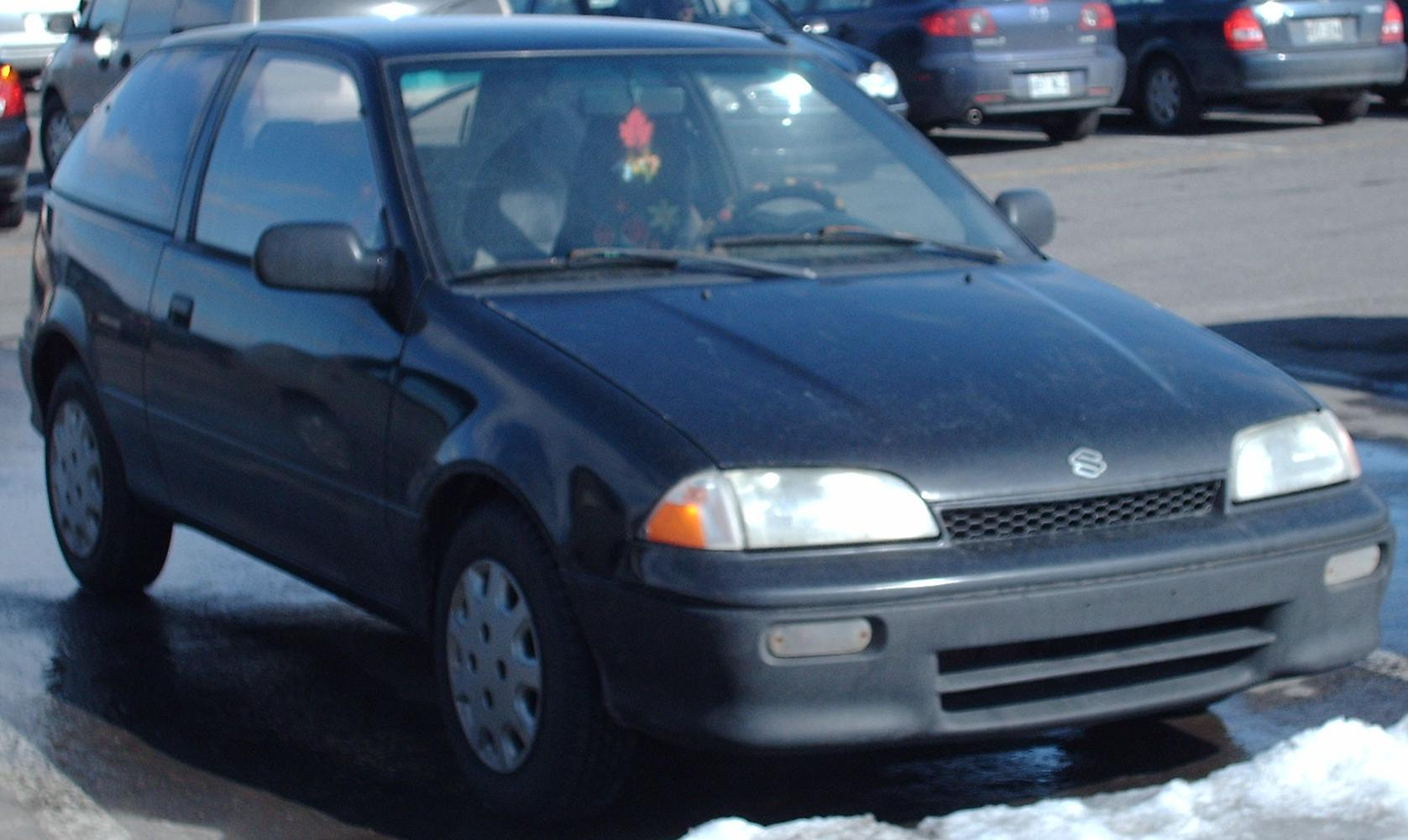
1992–1994 Suzuki Swift 3-door hatchback (Canada)

==== GM-badged ====
The second generation Cultus was sold as the Geo Metro in the US and Canada, and as the Pontiac Firefly in Canada and the Middle East, and as the Chevrolet Sprint in Canada and Chile. Unlike the four-cylinder Swifts, General Motors-badged units usually featured the 1.0-liter G10 three-cylinder engine, with a turbocharged version and a larger 1.3-liter engine available in some Canadian market versions. In late 1989, production began at CAMI Automotive, with a mere 660 cars finished the first year. From here on out, all Metro models with the exception of convertibles would be produced in Canada.

G10: 1.0 L3
In the United States, a single engine was available from 1989 through 1994: a 1.0-liter I3 engine. Rated at 61 PS (60 hp; 45 kW), the engine achieved 38 city, 45 highway mpg per the revised 2007 EPA mileage standards. The detuned 50 PS (49 hp; 37 kW) engine in the XFi, introduced in 1990, is optimized for high mileage. It combines a shorter duration cam, leaner fuel map, two ring pistons, and a higher final drive gear model to achieve 43 city, 51 highway per the revised 2007 EPA mileage standards.

As per the first generation, a turbocharged variant of G10 was also available in the Canadian Pontiac Firefly from 1989 to 1991. It was no longer available in the US market, however.

G13: 1.3 L I4
Canadian market Metros had the 1.3-liter engine available as an option beginning in 1993 in the three-door GSi model, and as standard equipment in the sedan (exclusive to the Canadian market at the time: American market Metros were not available in a sedan body style until 1995).

Geo Metro

Only available as a hatchback (later also a convertible) in the United States, the Canadian market also received Japanese-built four-door sedans. Canadian sales of the Geo Metro only began in 1992, after the demise of the Asüna brand. For 1990, the Metro's second model year, Geo introduced the Metro LSi models, which included an automatic transmission, air conditioning and a stereo with cassette player. Geo also introduced the frugal XFi model, featuring a lower powered economy-tuned version of the three-cylinder engine, a higher final drive gear ratio, and certain deleted interior amenities (e.g., the passenger mirror). It thereby achieved 43 city, 51 highway per the revised 2007 EPA mileage standards. XFi made up less than 10% of Metro sales. A little bit later, the Japanese-built convertible model debuted, available in LSi trim. In 1991, GM increased convertible production and added paint options. In 1992, the Metro received a facelift with new hubcaps, exterior modification and new interior controls.

In 1993, both LSi hatchbacks and the convertible were discontinued. Automatic door locks, which deploy after the car reaches a speed of approximately 8 mph (13 km/h) were introduced this year. In 1994, five-door hatchback production ended. In 1994, Geo dropped the XFi model.

Under its Geo Metro US badging, the American Council for an Energy-Efficient Economy (ACEEE) judged the 1.0-liter Geo Metro/Suzuki Cultus as the leading gasoline-fueled vehicle within their Greenest Vehicles list of 1998 and 1999.

Partially because of the renewed interest in the Metro/Cultus due to rising fuel costs, the July 2009 issue of the US Car and Driver included a 1998 Metro/Cultus 3-door hatchback among vehicles tested for fuel efficiency alongside two hybrid models: the 2010 Honda Insight and 2010 Toyota Prius models. During a 600-mile long, mixed driving conditions, route. While notably lacking in modern conveniences and weighing considerably less, the Cultus/Metro tied in first place with the Prius for best overall fuel economy at 42 mpg_{‑US} (5.6 L/100 km).

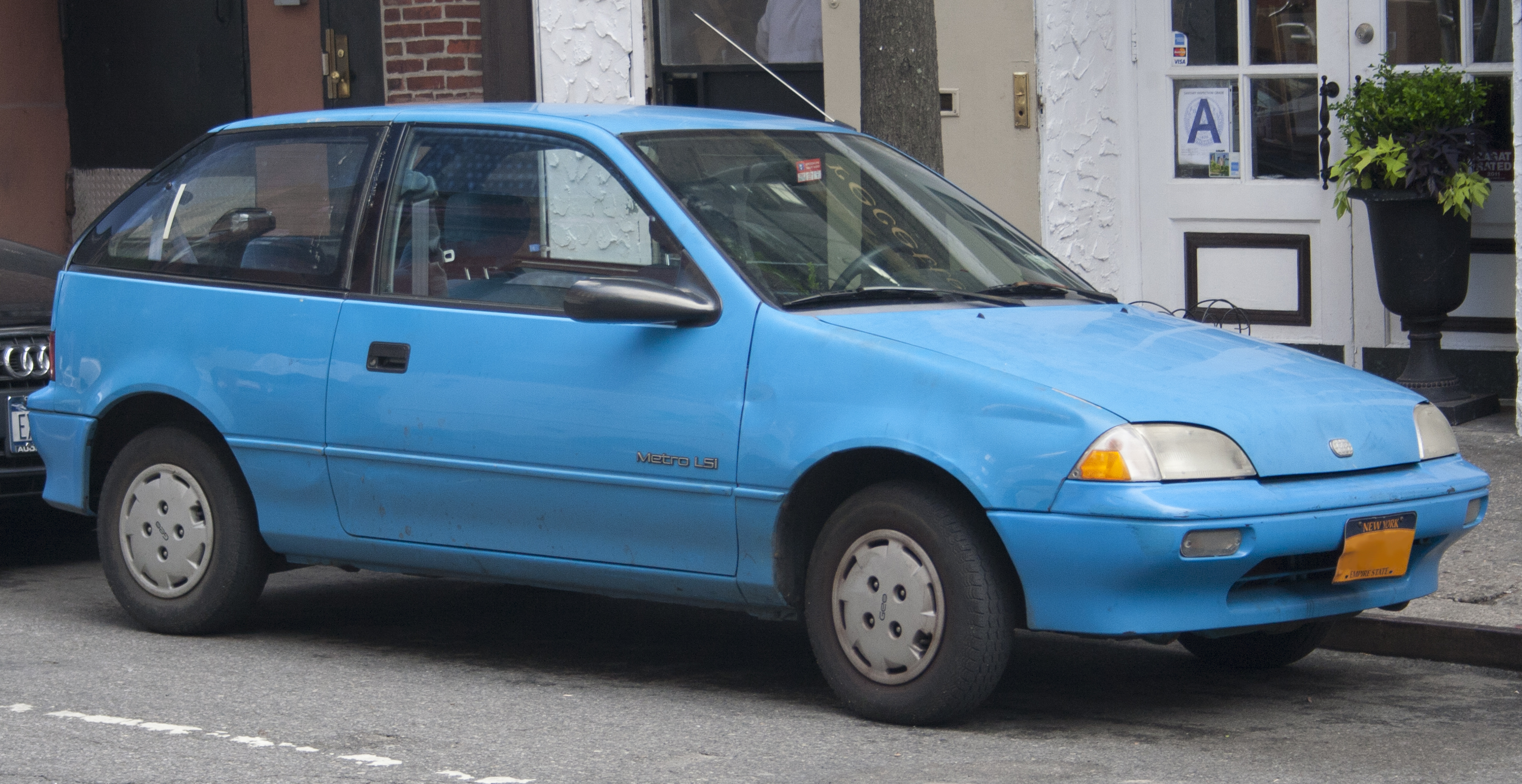
1989–1991 Geo Metro 3-door hatchback (US)

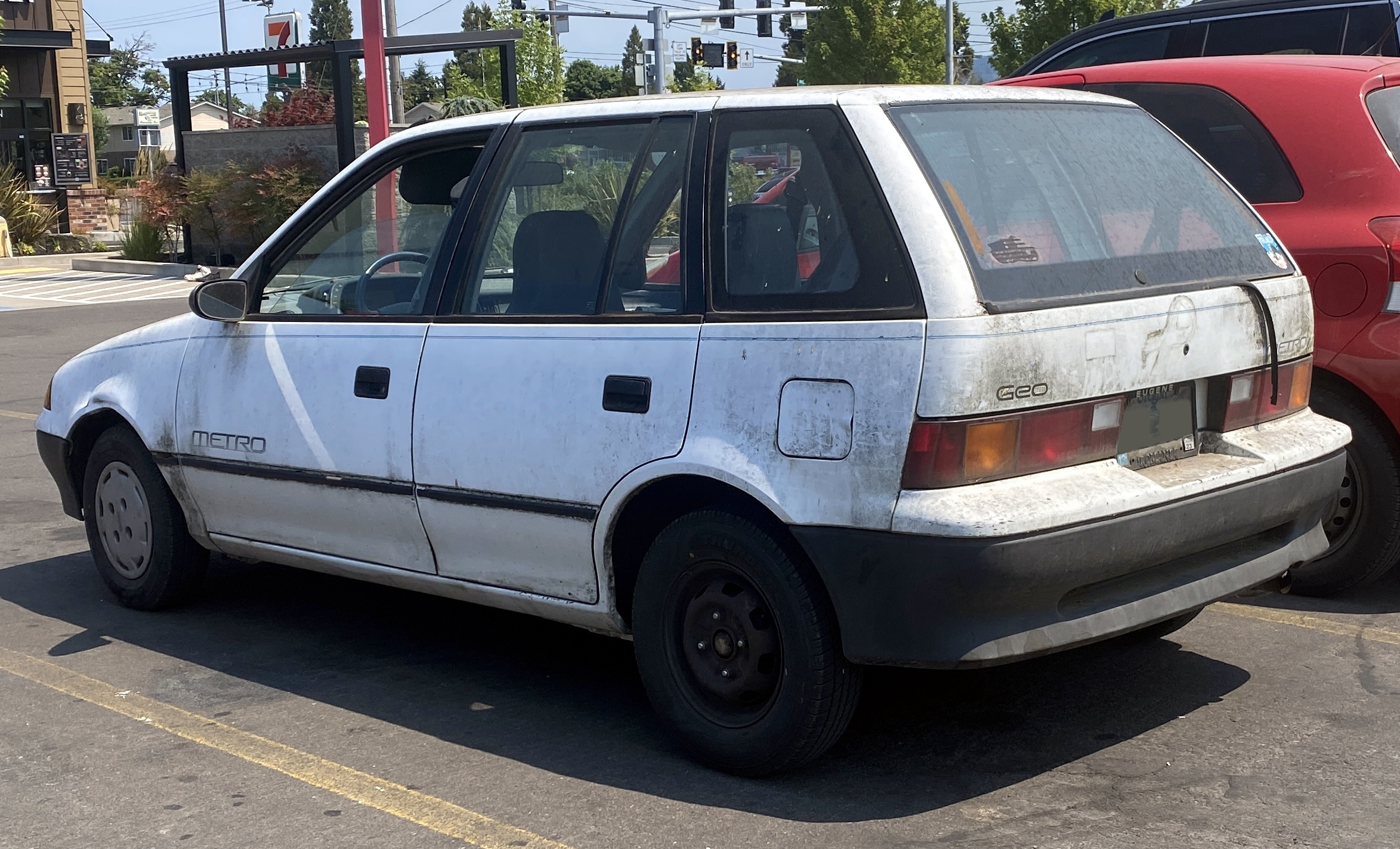
1989–1991 Geo Metro 5-door hatchback (US)

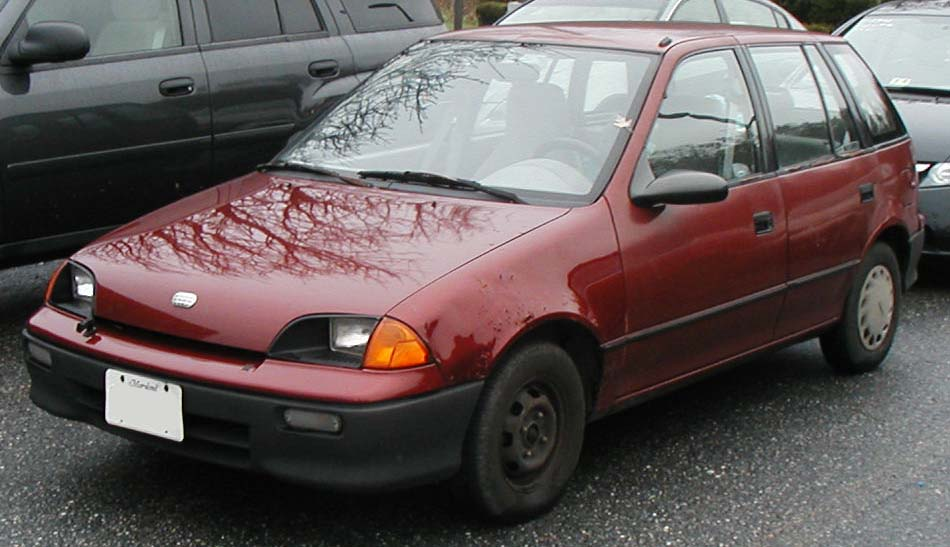
1992–1994 Geo Metro 5-door (US)

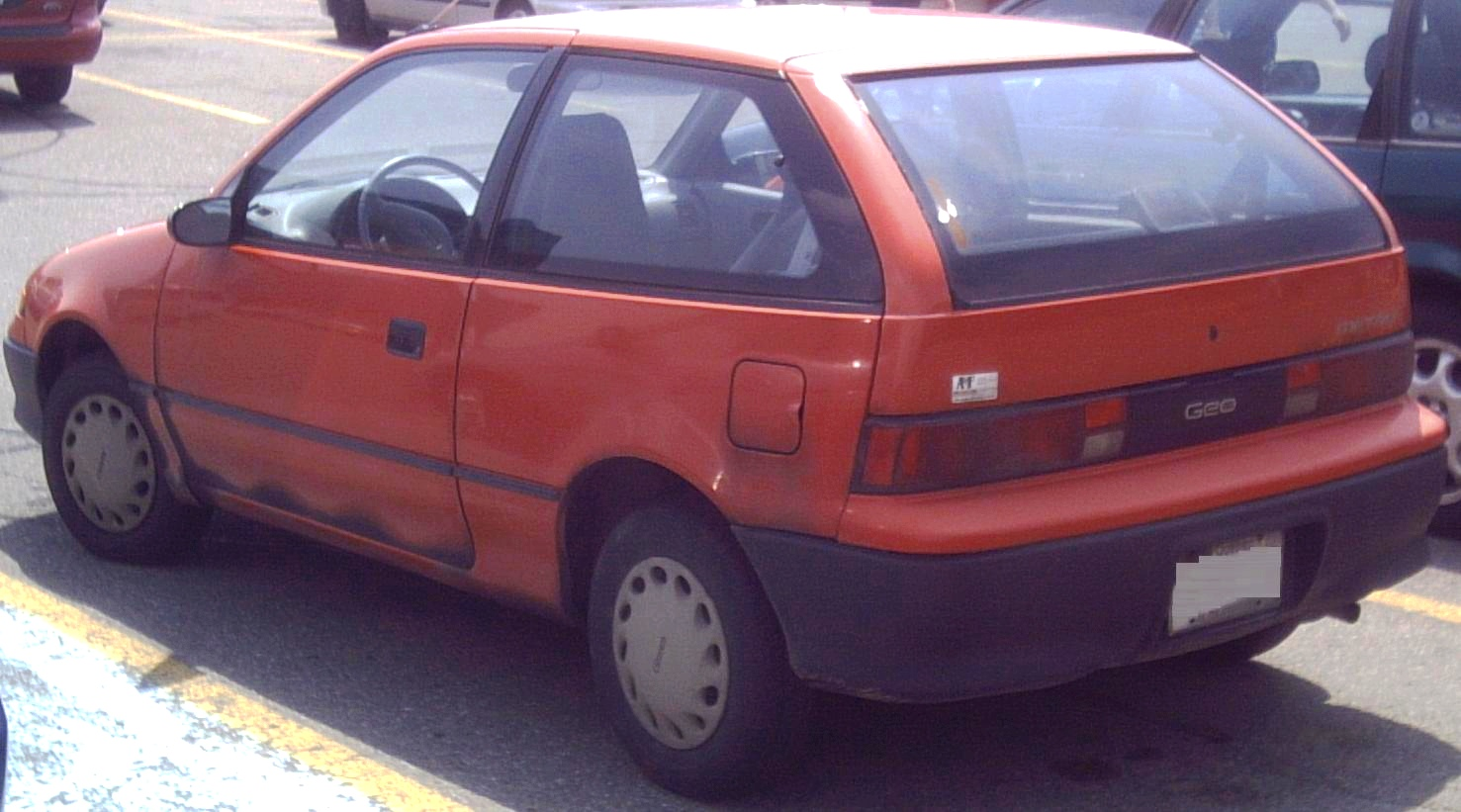
1992–1994 Geo Metro 3-door hatchback (US)

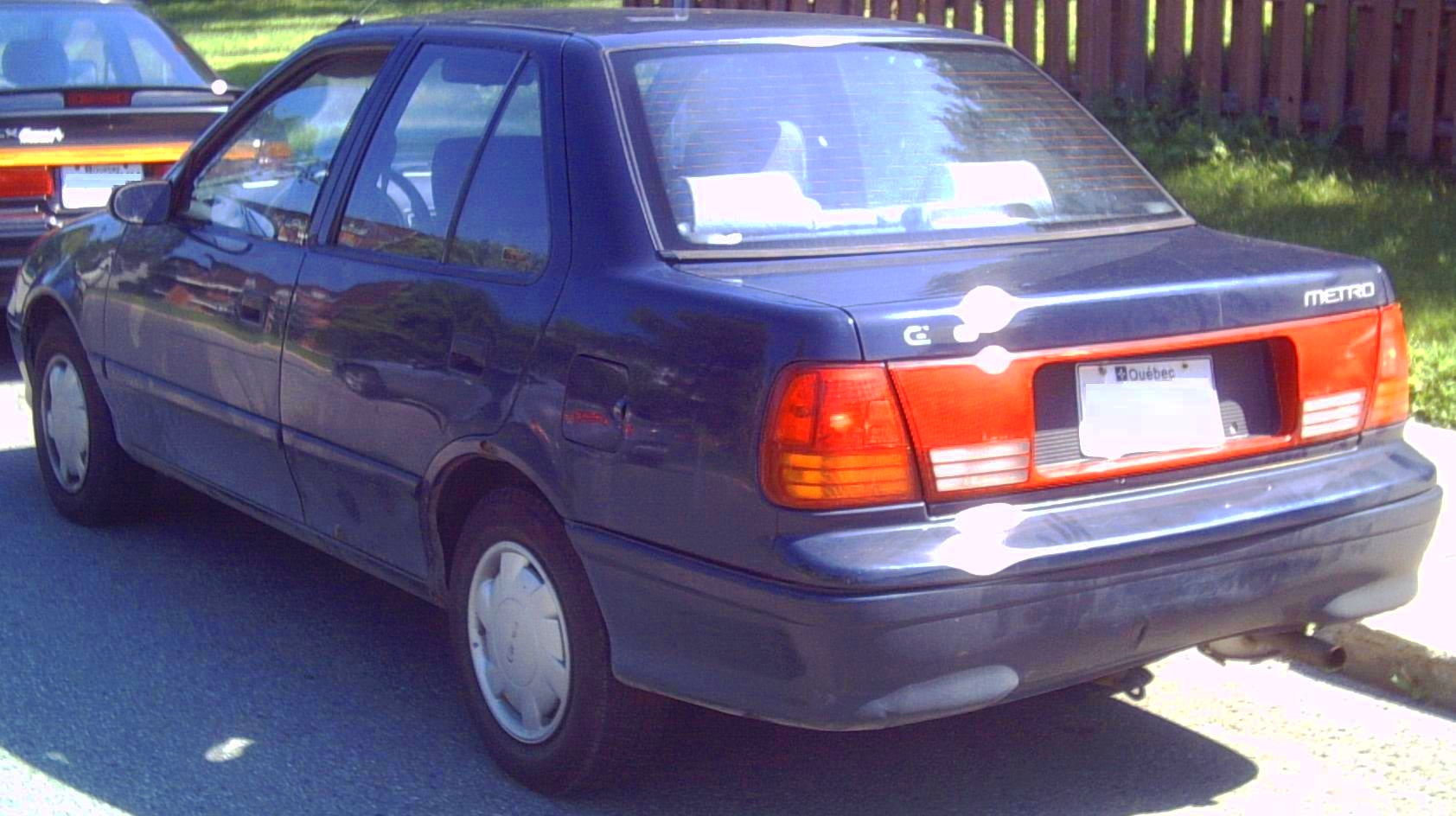
1992–1994 Geo Metro sedan (Canada)

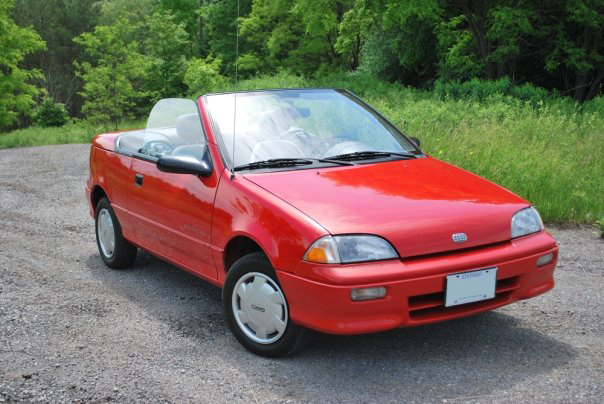
1992 Geo Metro convertible (US)

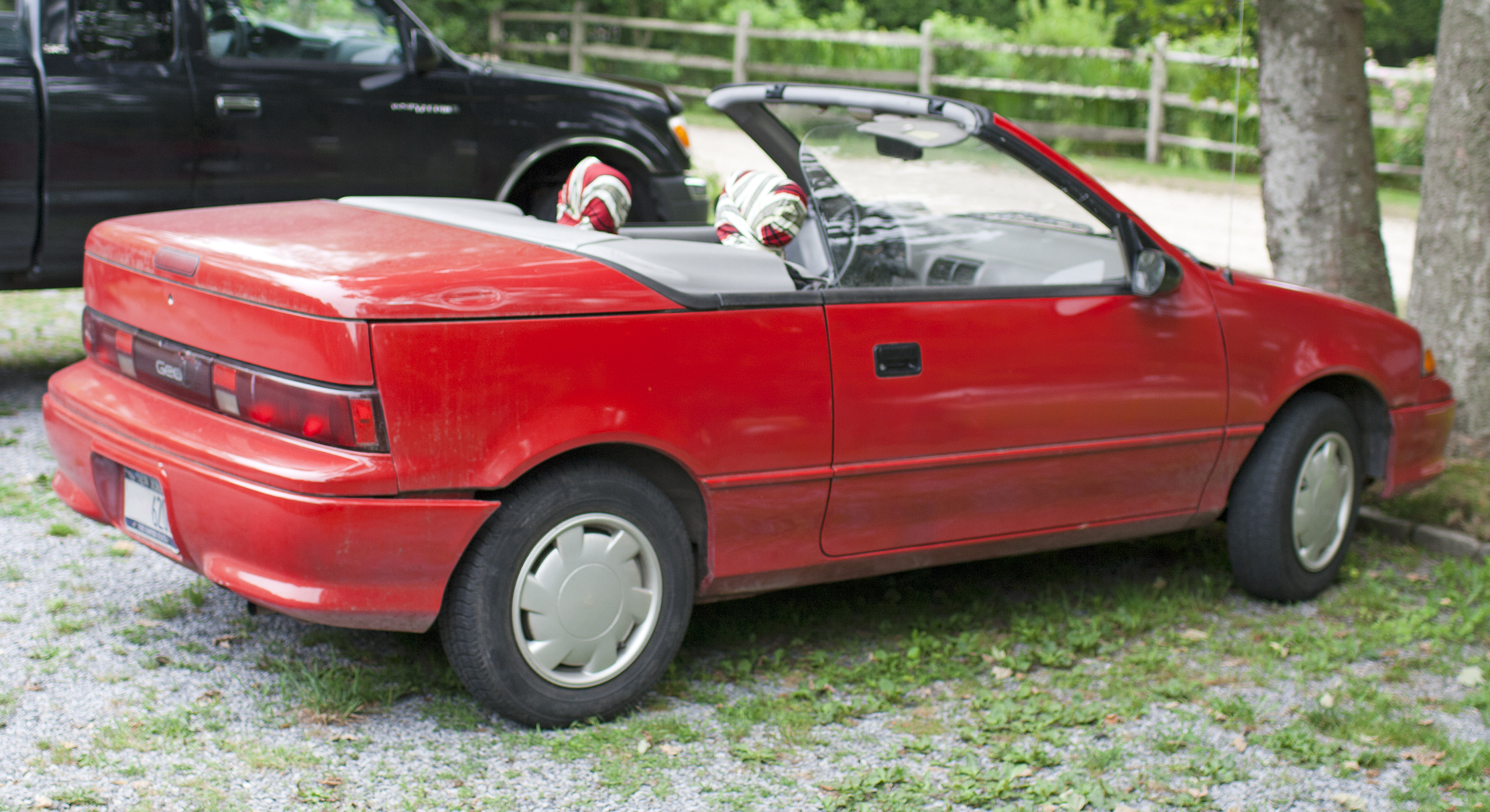
Geo Metro convertible (US)

Chevrolet Sprint

The Sprint badge continued to be used in the Canadian market until the Geo brand was introduced in 1992. Unlike its American counterparts, the Canadian Sprint remained available with the 1.0-liter turbo engine. The Chevrolet Sprint hatchback was also sold in Chile from 1994 to 1996, but adopted the facelifted Suzuki Swift appearance.

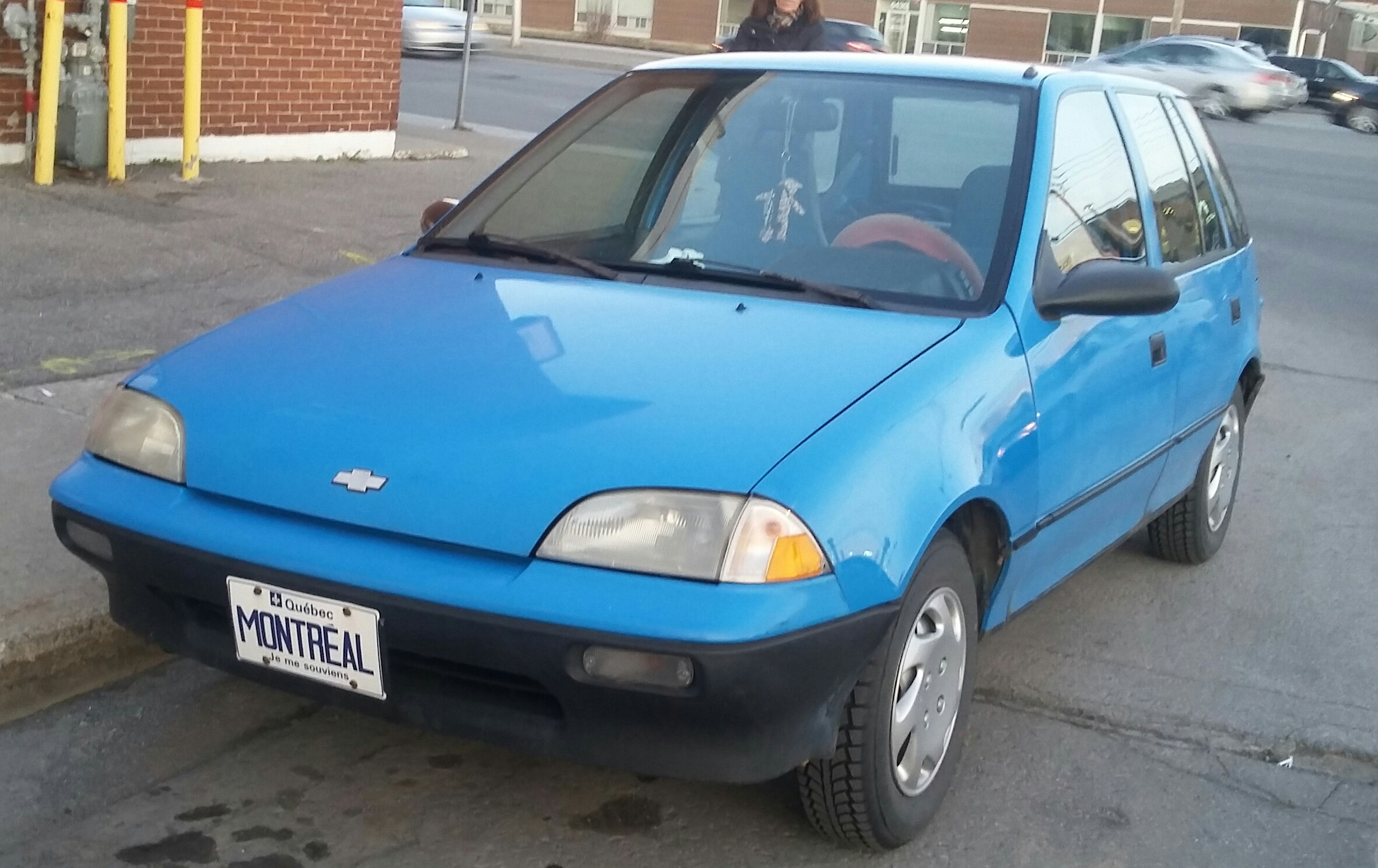
1989–1991 Chevrolet Sprint 5-door hatchback (Canada)

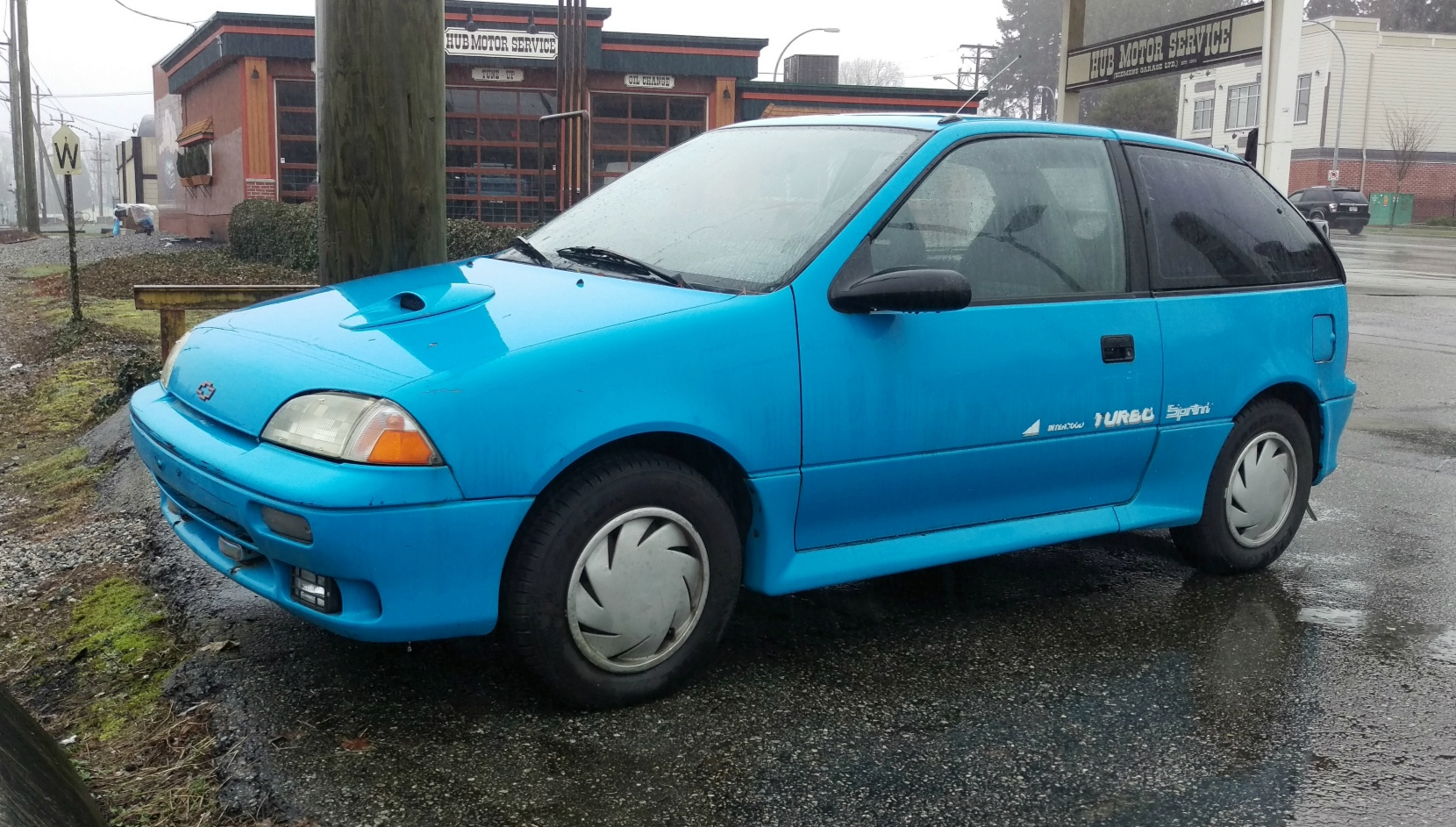
1989–1991 Chevrolet Sprint Turbo 3-door hatchback (Canada)

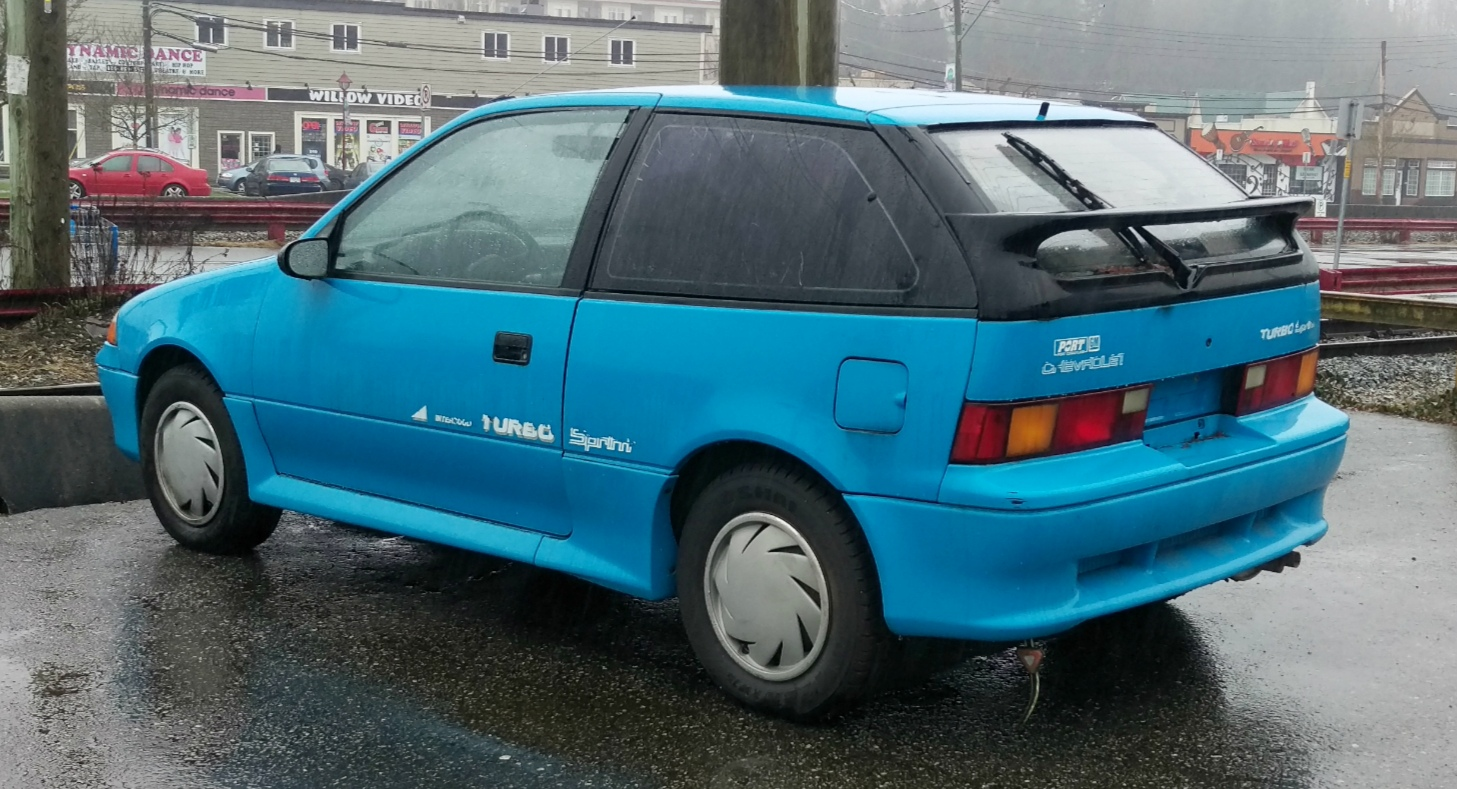
1989–1991 Chevrolet Sprint Turbo 3-door hatchback (Canada)

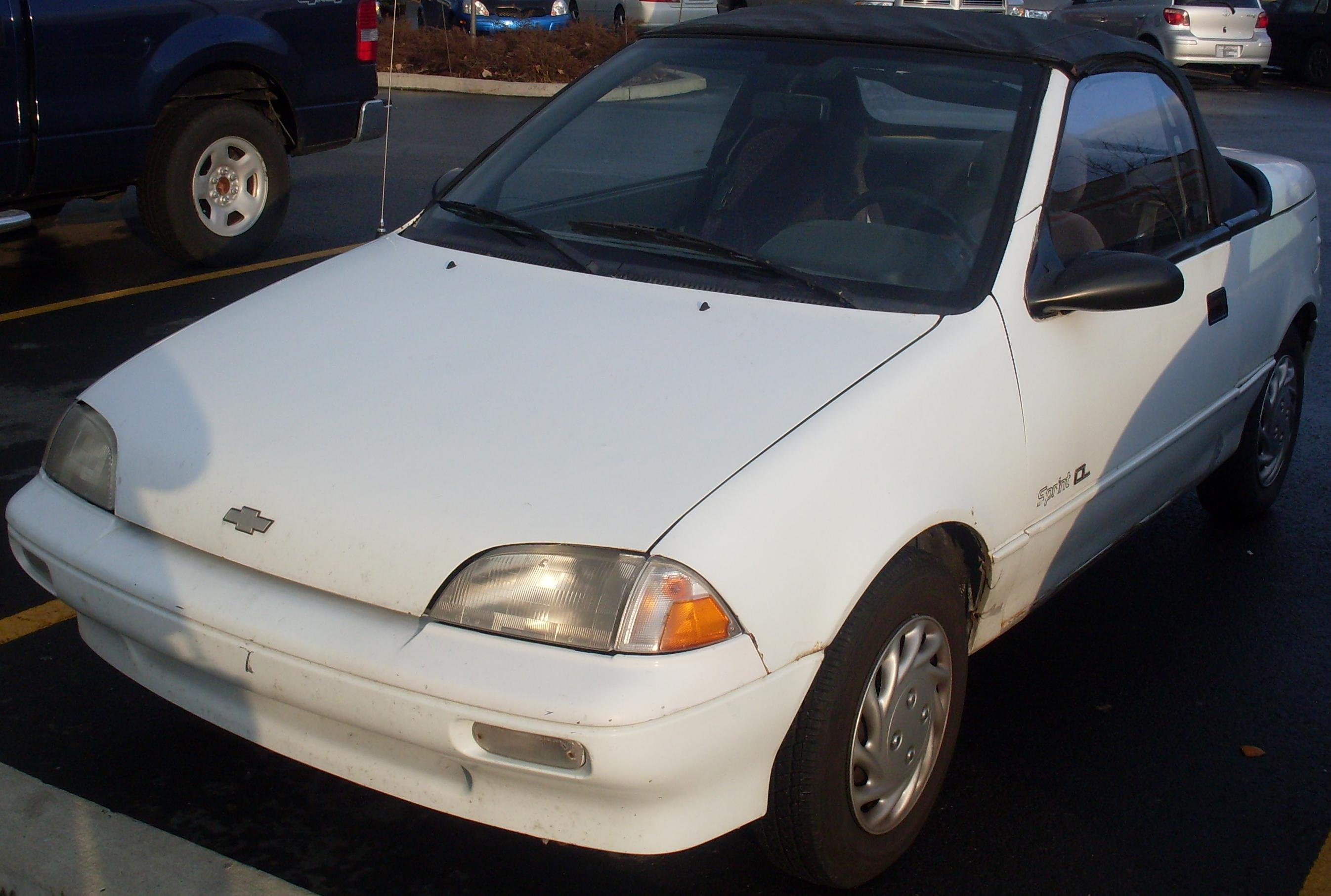
1990–1991 Chevrolet Sprint convertible (Canada)

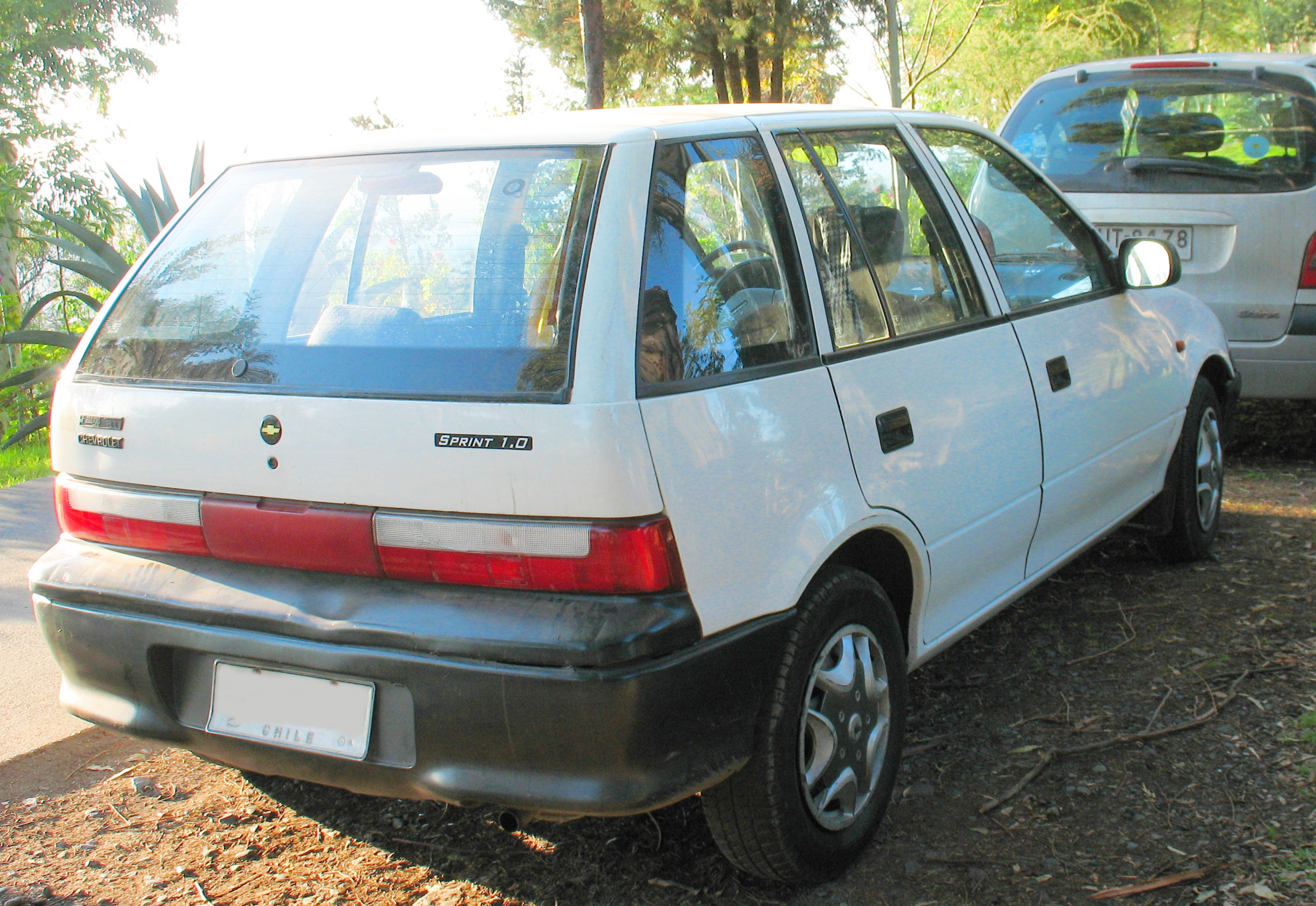
1994–1996 Chevrolet Sprint 5-door hatchback (Chile)

Pontiac Firefly

Introduced for 1989, the Firefly was also available as a convertible and as a four-door sedan from 1990 until 1991. All hatchbacks were manufactured at CAMI, while convertibles and sedans were sourced from Japanese production. Just like the Chevrolet Sprint, the Firefly was also available with a 1.0-liter turbo engine option. The Firefly was not marketed for the 1992 and 1993 model years when the 1993-only "Asüna" brand introduced the larger 1992 GT/SE to replace the Passport Optima and the pre-facelift Firefly.

In 1994, the Firefly returned with a facelift following the demise of the Asüna brand, available as a hatchback and a sedan. It was short-lived, being replaced by the third generation for the next year.

The Firefly was also marketed in the Middle East, but without the convertible option.

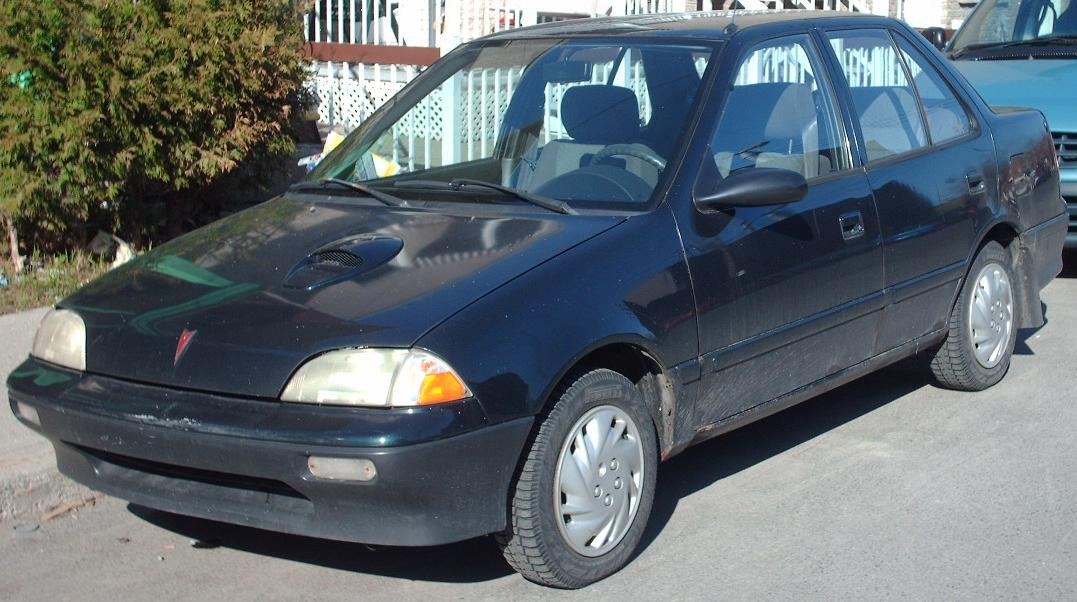
1990–1991 Pontiac Firefly sedan (Canada)

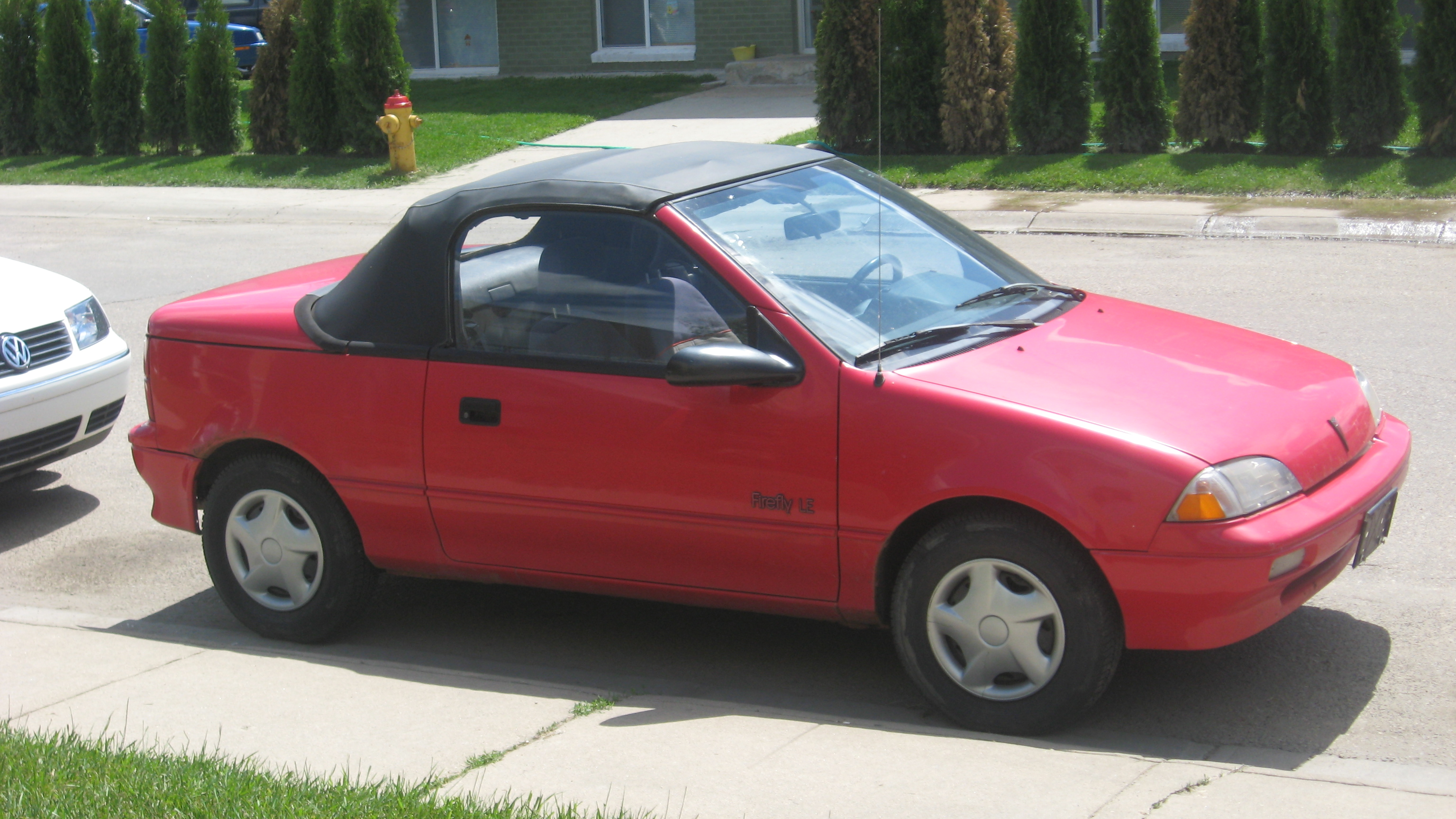
1989–1991 Pontiac Firefly convertible (Canada)

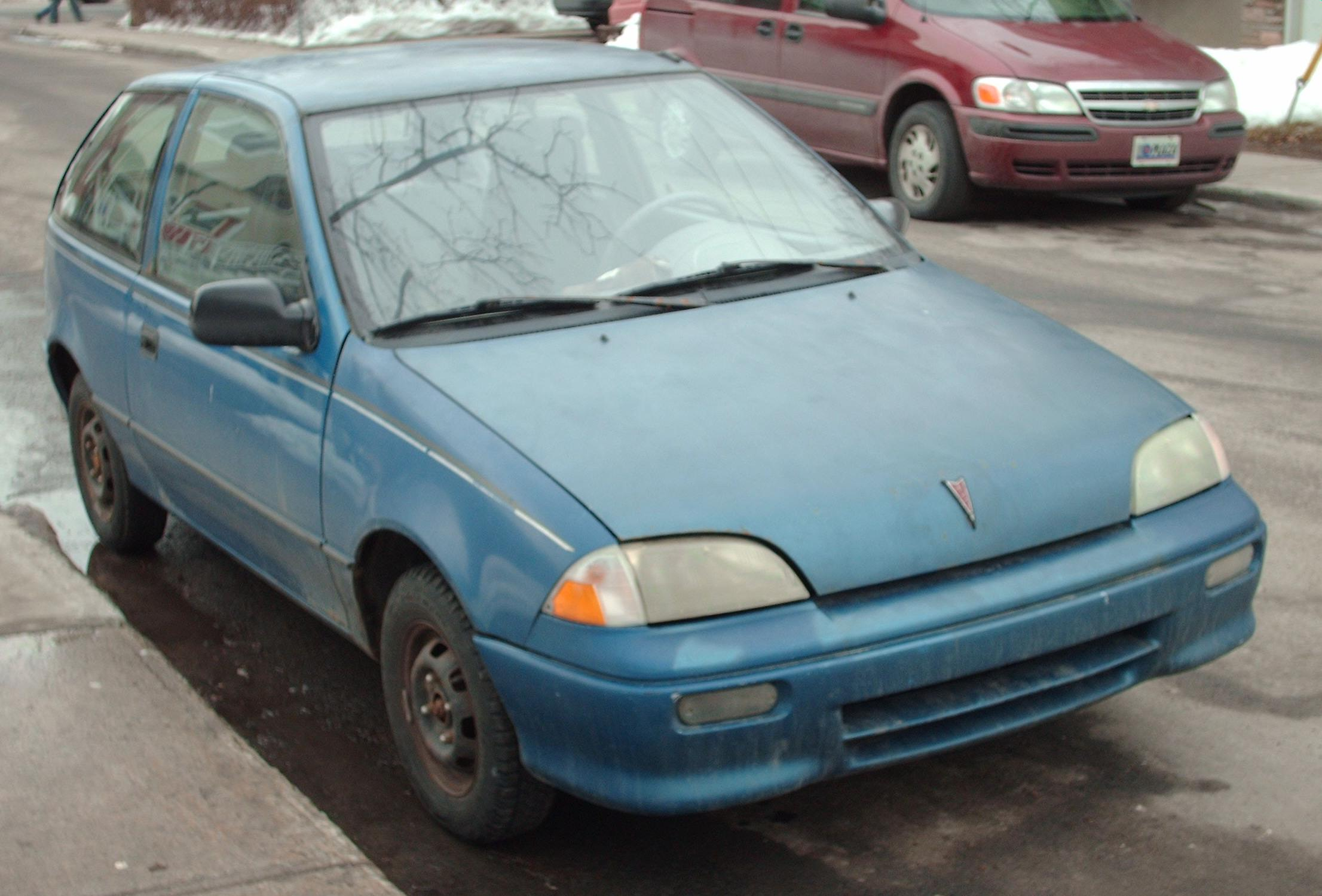
1994 Pontiac Firefly 3-door hatchback (Canada)

==== Safety ====
US second generation models received the following NHTSA's New Car Assessment Program ratings:

- Front Impact, Driver: Safety Concern: High likelihood of thigh injury
- Front Impact, Passenger:

See NHTSA Test Results: 1994 Geo Metro

=== Maruti 1000 ===
Maruti 1000
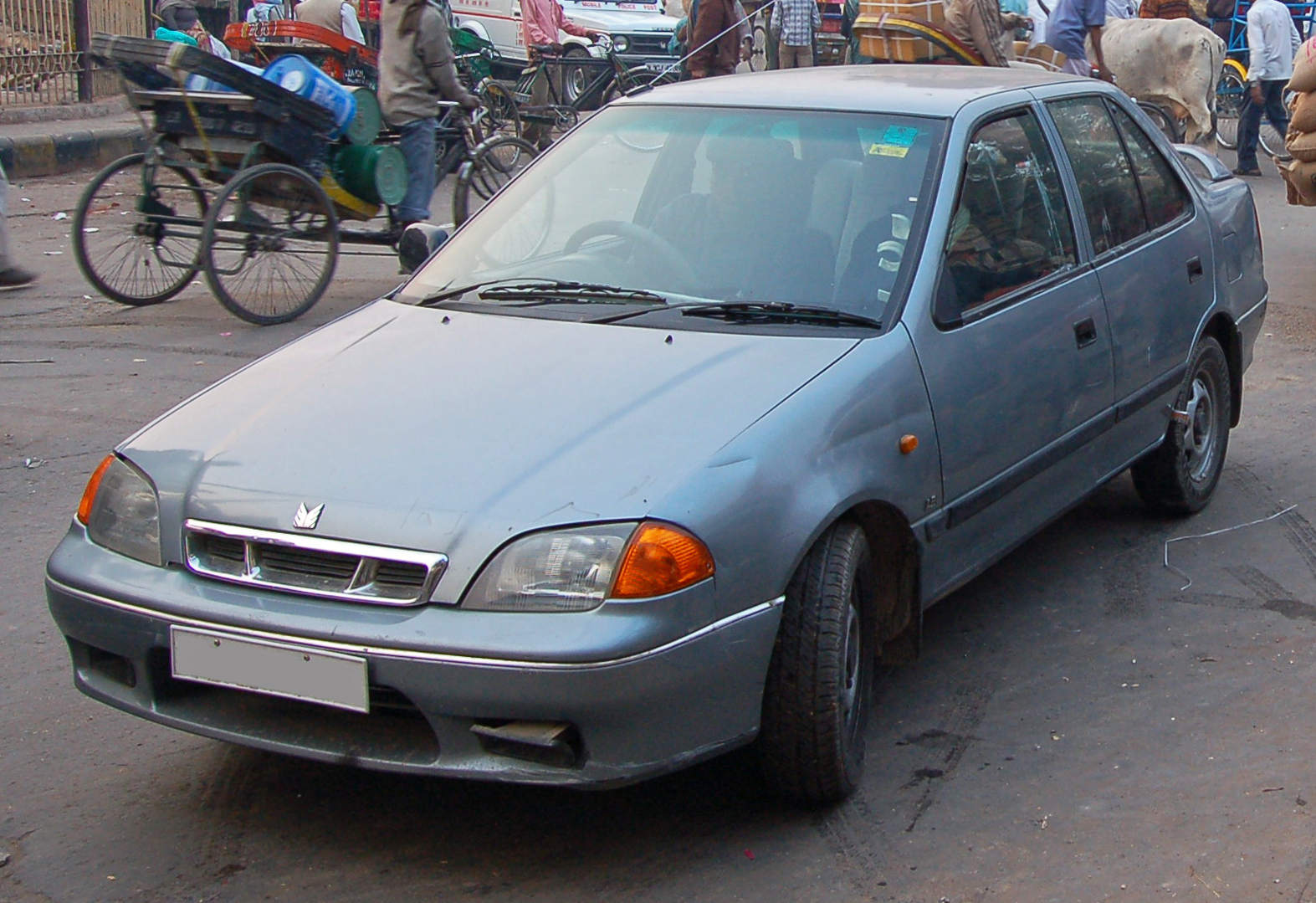
- 1998–2002 Maruti Esteem VXi

Overview
- Manufacturer: Maruti Suzuki
- Also called: Maruti Esteem
- Production: 1990–2008

Body and chassis
- Body style: 4-door sedan

Powertrain
- Engine: Petrol: 970 cc F10A SOHC 8V I4; 1298 cc G13BA SOHC 8V I4; 1298 cc G13BB SOHC 16V I4; Diesel: 1527 cc TUD5 SOHC 8V I4
- Transmission: 5-speed manual; 3-speed automatic

Dimensions
- Wheelbase: 2,365 mm (93.1 in)
- Length: 4,075 mm (160.4 in); 4,095 mm (161.2 in) (Esteem)
- Width: 1,575 mm (62.0 in)
- Height: 1,395 mm (54.9 in)
- Curb weight: 825–935 kg (1,818.8–2,061.3 lb)

Chronology
- Successor: Suzuki Dzire

The Maruti 1000, made by Maruti Udyog is a sedan-type car produced in India between October 1990 and 2000. The car is a rebadged Suzuki Cultus/Swift and was introduced in October 1990 (although Maruti had been showing the car since 1989). With a large waiting list for all Maruti cars, a computerized lottery was used to decide who got a chance to buy a Maruti 1000. This was remarkable as the car was considered a luxury vehicle at the time, hard to conceive of from today's viewpoint – but in 1990, when it was released, its purchase price was high enough that it was out of reach for more than 99.5% of India's population. It sold at Rs. 381,000. A period commentator even accused the 1000 of being a project "by the elite for the elite.

The car came with a 970 cc engine whose output was just 46 hp and proved underpowered for a car that weighed 825 kg (1,819 lb). This outdated engine was also installed by Suzuki in the Cultus/Swift range for a few other developing markets. A 1.0 GLX version, fully equipped with air conditioning, "deluxe carpets," and leather interior, was also available to those able to pay for the car in foreign exchange.

==== Maruti Esteem ====
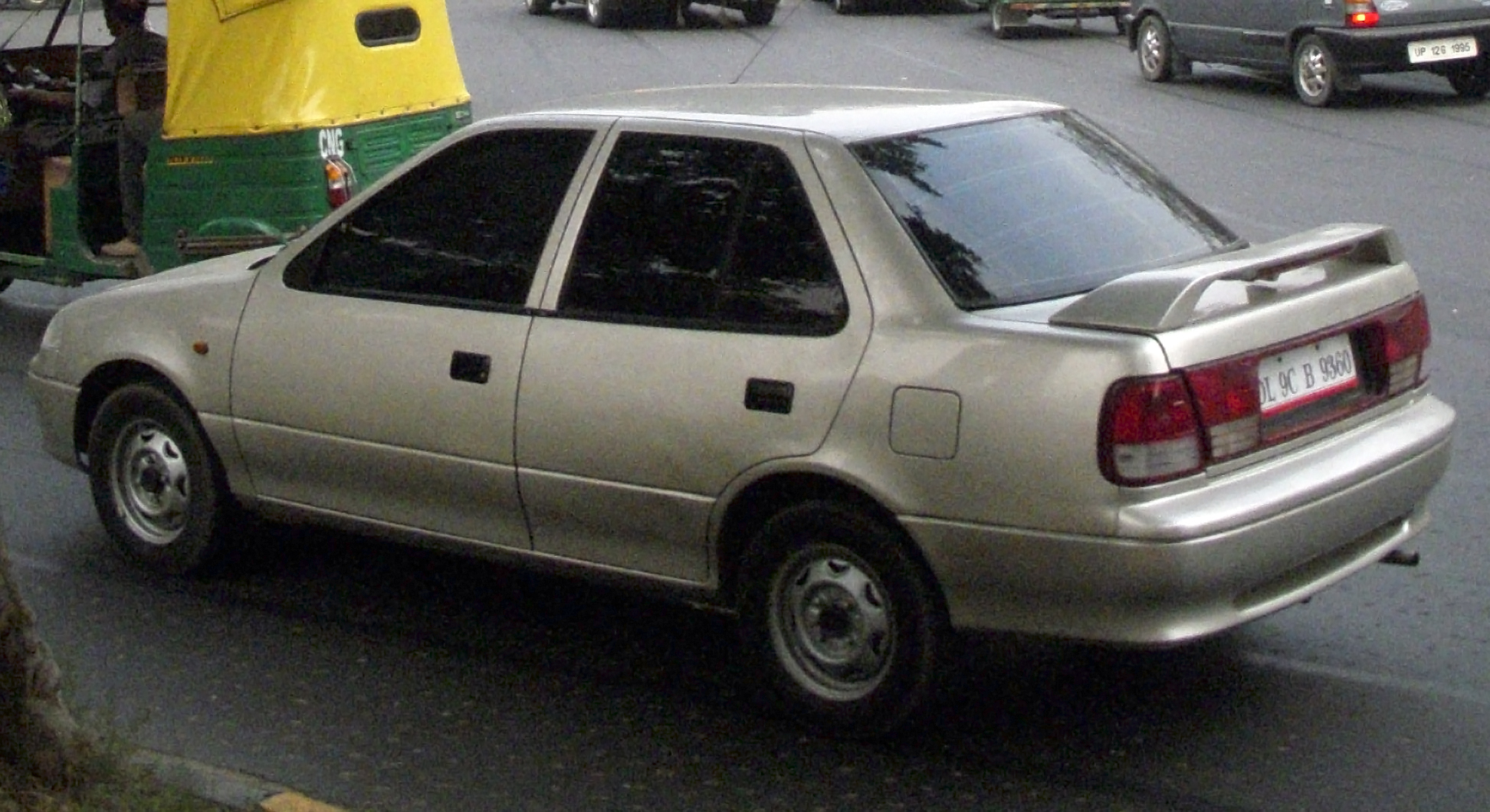
1998–2002 Maruti Esteem

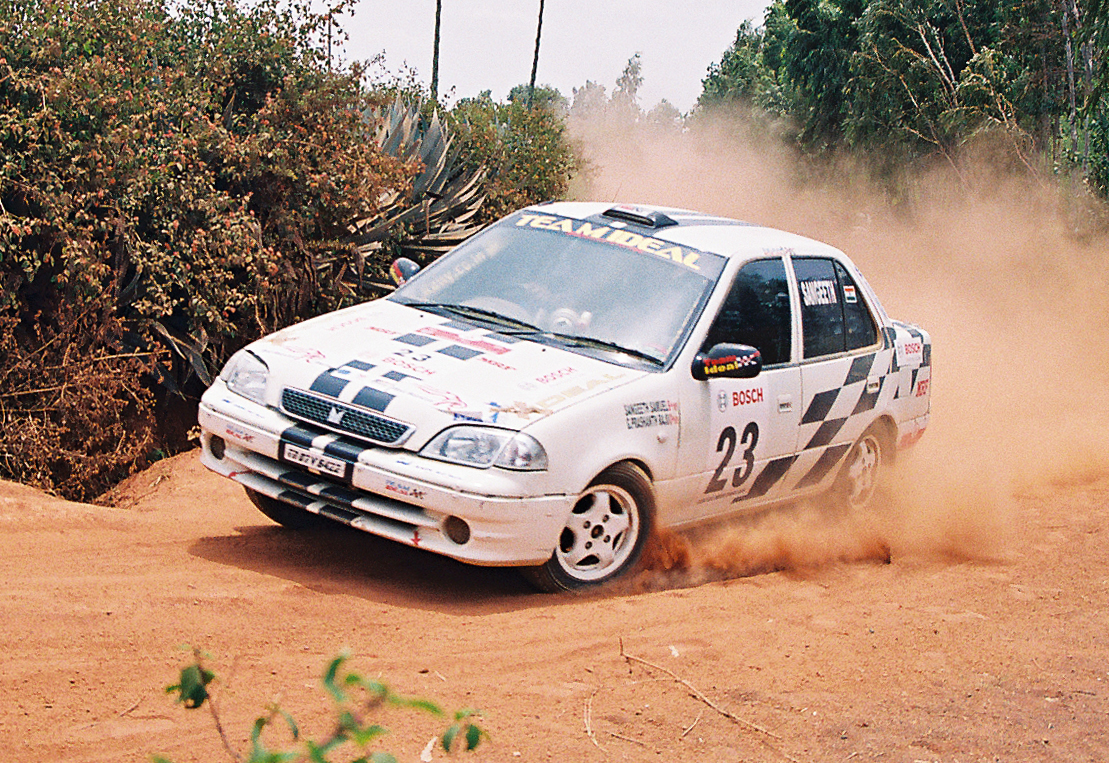
Maruti Esteem being rallied

In November 1994, an upgraded version of this car, with a more powerful 1.3-liter engine, was released with similar looks and the new name Maruti Esteem. Initially, the car looked very similar to the Maruti 1000, except for different fabric in seats and door trims and 'ESTEEM' badging at the rear. The first model had a 65 PS (64 hp; 48 kW) carburetted engine but this was replaced by an 85 PS (84 hp; 63 kW) fuel injected 16-valve unit in 2000. The engine was found to have one of the highest power-to-weight ratios in the under two-liter class, and helped the Esteem reach considerable success in Indian auto racing, where it is still popular in rallying. Soon in end-1995, two trims were launched, base LX and the higher VX. The latter boasted of contemporary features like power steering, power locking and 4 door power windows. An automatic AX variant also was released in June 1996 with a torque-converter type automatic transmission. Air conditioning and remote fuel lid opener was standard in Esteem unlike the 1000. The Maruti 1000 was kept below the Esteem and remained in production until March 2000 and was eventually discontinued due to low sales.

In October 1998, the Esteem received a full facelift which included a new grille, new tail lights and new head lights much inspired by the Holden cousins. The rear also gained an extra cluster of lights as standard replacing the previous black panel.

In January 2000, when Maruti launched Esteem with MPFI system, the LX variant got equipped with front power windows and central locking. Chrome radiator grille, rear armrest and driver seat height adjuster also became a part of Esteem's equipment list. Several new colour options also were added.

In August 2002, another minor change was made when the chrome grille was replaced by a mesh grille and a rear spoiler was added in the top VXi trim. Special edition models such as Limited and Velocity also were released in 2002.

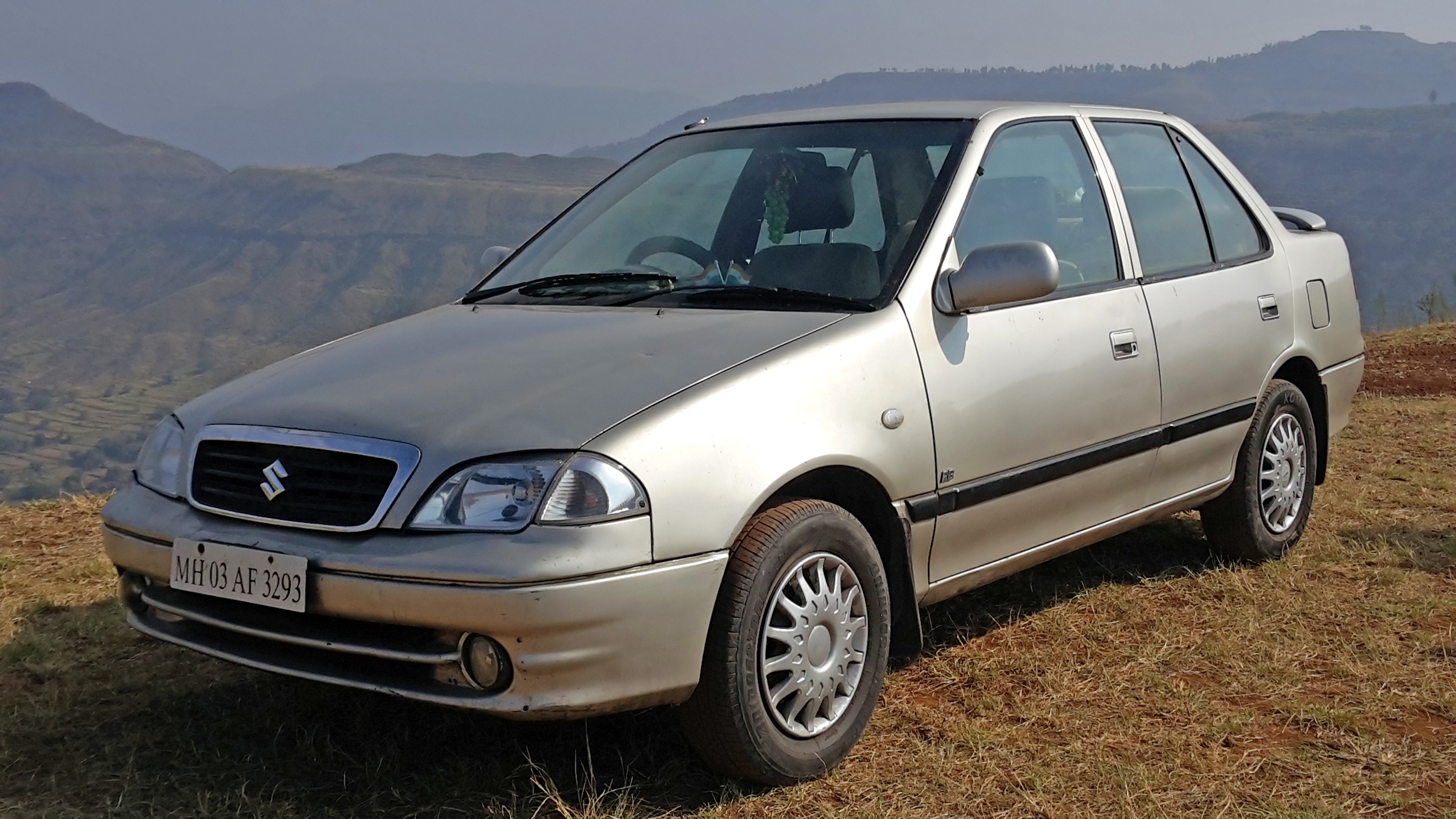

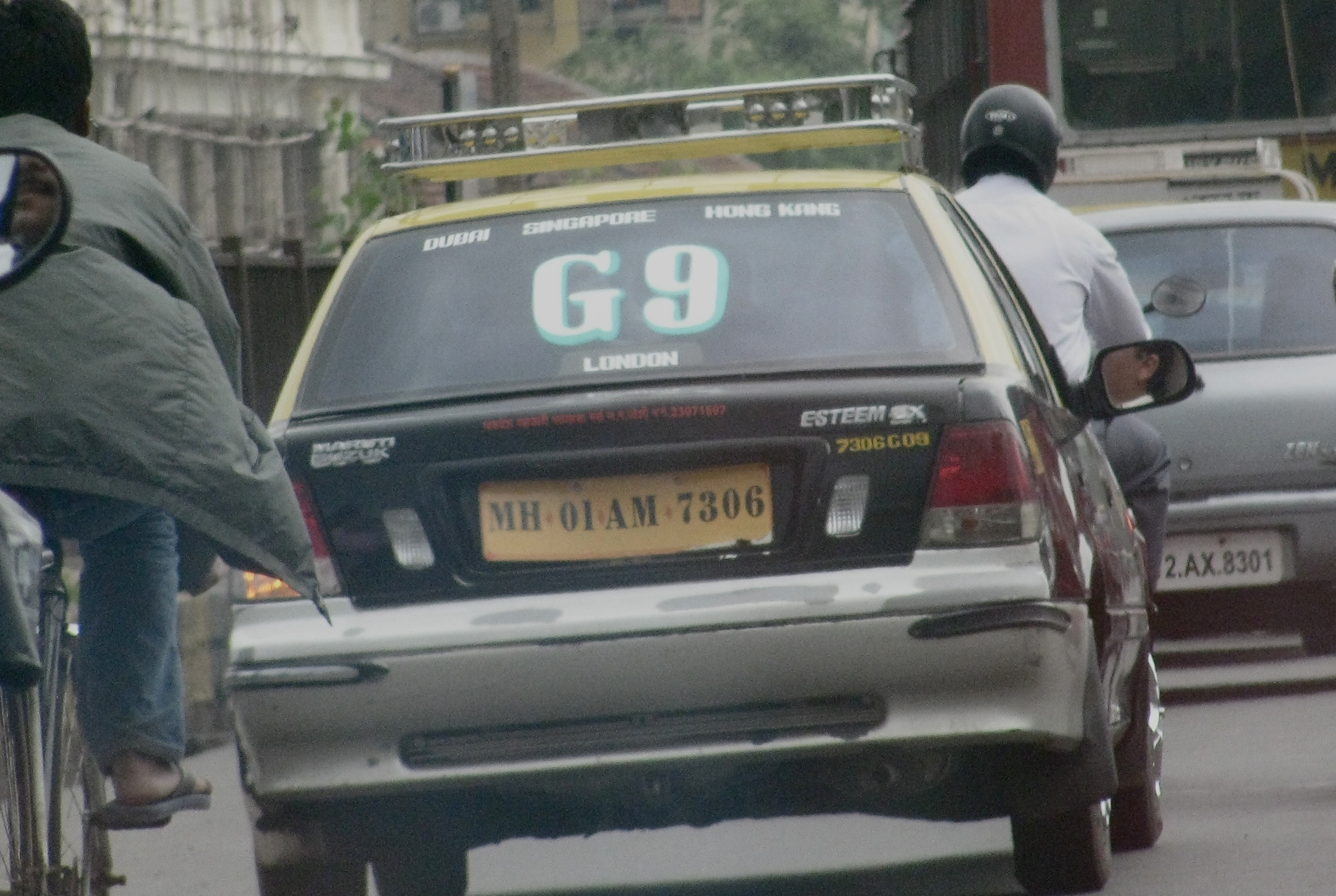
2004–2008 Maruti Esteem

Another facelift took place in July 2004, consisting of new lights and bumpers, which were borrowed from the Chinese "Changan Suzuki Lingyang" (Antelope) version of the Swift sedan. The new version also received clear lens tail lights and new hubcaps, while new colours were introduced again.

The Esteem was also available with a 1527 cc Peugeot TUD5 diesel engine as well, at a slightly higher price. When Bharat Stage 3 emission rules were made stricter, Maruti phased out this diesel variant sometime in 2005. The models offered in the mid-2000s were:

- LX (base model/manual-steering/AC)
- LXi (power steering, front power windows)
- VXi (4 door power windows, central locking, rear demister, power antenna, rear spoiler)
- AX 3 speed (automatic transmission), equivalent to VXi
- D (diesel base model, equivalent to LX)
- Di (diesel, equivalent to LXi)

The 1.3-liter (74 mm (2.9 in) bore by 75.5 mm (3 in) stroke) 16-valve SOHC engine has a compression ratio of 9.0:1 and makes 85 PS (84 hp; 63 kW) at 6000 rpm and 105 N⋅m (77 lb⋅ft; 10.7 kg⋅m) of torque at 3000 rpm, this was later increased to 110 N⋅m (81 lb⋅ft; 11 kg⋅m). The same engine was later used by the then upgraded Maruti Gypsy King, Maruti Versa and the Maruti Suzuki Swift. The Peugeot-sourced TUD5 1.5-liter (77 mm (3 in) bore by 82 mm (3.2 in) stroke) eight-valve engine had a compression ratio of 23.0:1 and made 57 PS (56 hp; 42 kW) at 5000 rpm and 96 N⋅m (71 lb⋅ft; 9.8 kg⋅m) of torque at 2500 rpm. The Esteem received a major facelift in 2004 and production ended in December 2008, with the car being replaced by the new Suzuki Swift DZire.

== Marketing ==
=== Japan ===
The Suzuki Cultus developed through generation two in Japan, and was superseded by the Cultus Crescent – a larger offspring of the Cultus.

==== Cultus ====
The second generation was introduced in 1988 with similar dimensions and but redesigned to make better use of the cargo area and cabin space. Like its predecessor, the new Cultus was available as a 3- or 5-door hatchback, and was powered by G-series engines from 1.0 to 1.3 liters. However, this last one had adopted an SOHC 16-valve arrangement, with standard fuel injection. Power was 58 PS (43 kW) and 82 PS (60 kW), respectively. For the first time, 4WD was optional on the larger engine.

The Cultus GTi was now much more powerful, reaching 115 PS JIS (85 kW) with updated version of the previous GTi engine: the G13B engine that had higher compression pistons (11.5:1 compression ratio), tubular exhaust headers, a tubular intake manifold, larger camshafts and a reprogrammed ECU. Some models of the Cultus GTi were also available with all-wheel drive.

More well outfitted versions were the Cultus Ellesse (which included automatic air conditioning, central locking, power windows and adjustable steering wheel) and the Esteem, a sedan version. The Esteem featured a larger 1.5-liter engine, capable of reaching 91 PS (67 kW), and it was available with optional 4WD. The equipment was the same as the Cultus Ellesse.

In 1992, Suzuki introduced a two-seat convertible, based on the hatchback body – and dropped it again shortly thereafter.

- 1988–1998 – AA34S, AA44S, AB34S, AB44S
- 1992–1993 – AK34S (Cultus Convertible)

==== Cultus Crescent ====
The Suzuki Cultus and Cultus Crescent were two distinct but related models sold in Japan by Suzuki – with the Cultus Crescent eventually superseding the Cultus. The Cultus Crescent was introduced in the Japanese market in January 1995 sharing the same platform and many components from the Cultus – although with a chassis stretched by 10 cm (4 in) and featuring completely different styling.

The Cultus Crescent was available initially in two body variants, a three-door hatchback and a four-door saloon. In February 1996, Suzuki introduced the Cultus Crescent Wagon, Suzuki's first station wagon (excluding kei cars). In May 1998, the base Cultus/Swift was renamed "Cultus M Series" in Japan, and Suzuki consequently dropped the "Crescent" name on the larger model, which was now simply called Cultus, and received new front end styling. The 1.6-liter 4WD variant was extended to the rest of the lineup, but not the 1.8-liter engine, which was only available in the other body styles other than the wagon in export markets. The Cultus remained in production in Japan until August 2002, after a year of overlapping with its replacement, the larger and entirely new Aerio.

Production of the Cultus began in other countries and was available in developing markets such as India as the Maruti Suzuki Baleno until production ceased in 2007 to make way for the Suzuki SX4. Elsewhere internationally, the larger Cultus Crescent was marketed as the Suzuki Baleno and Esteem. In the Philippines, it was marketed as the Chevrolet Cassia.

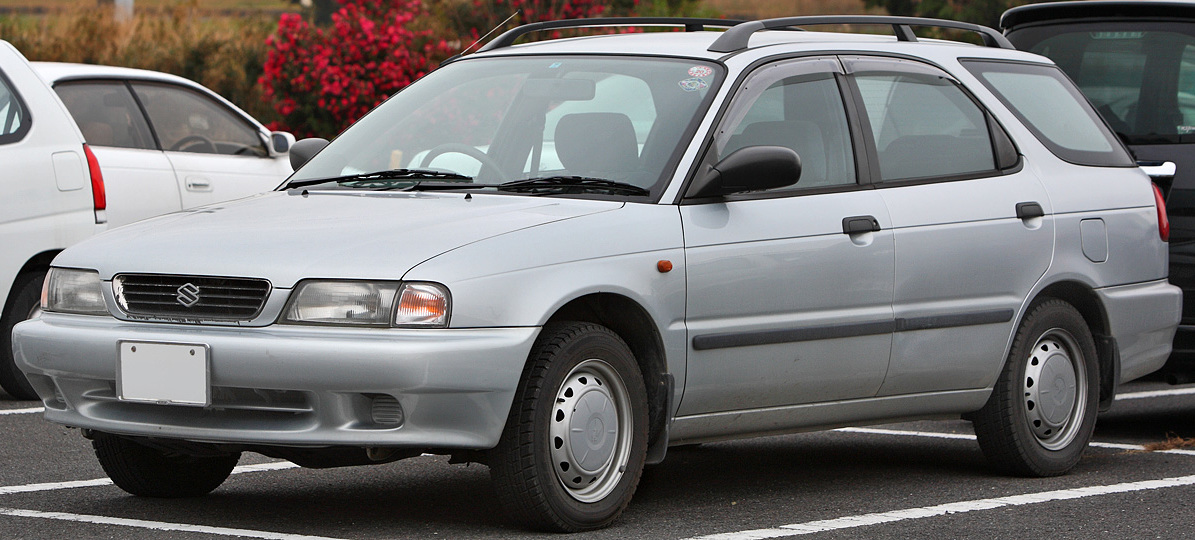
1996–1998 Suzuki Cultus Crescent Wagon (Japan)

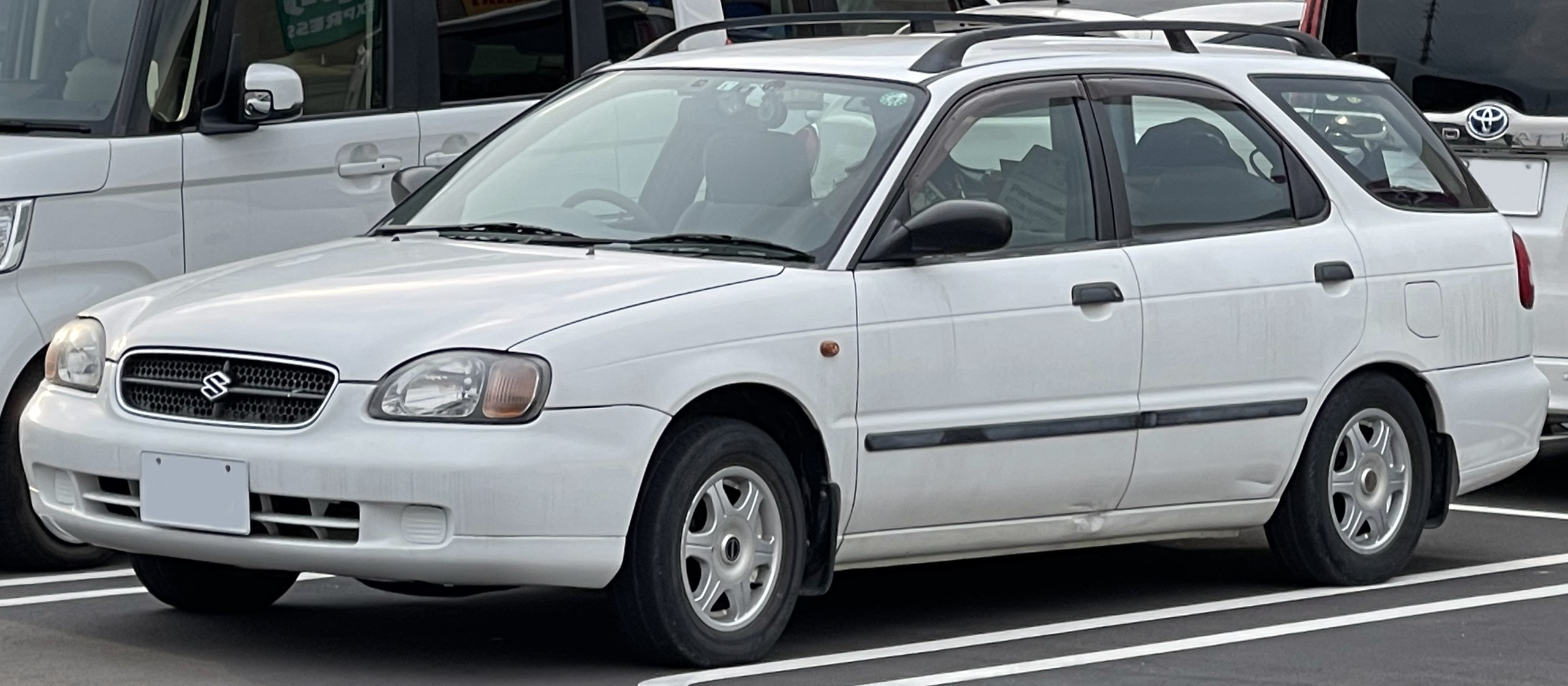
1998–2002 Suzuki Cultus Wagon (Japan)

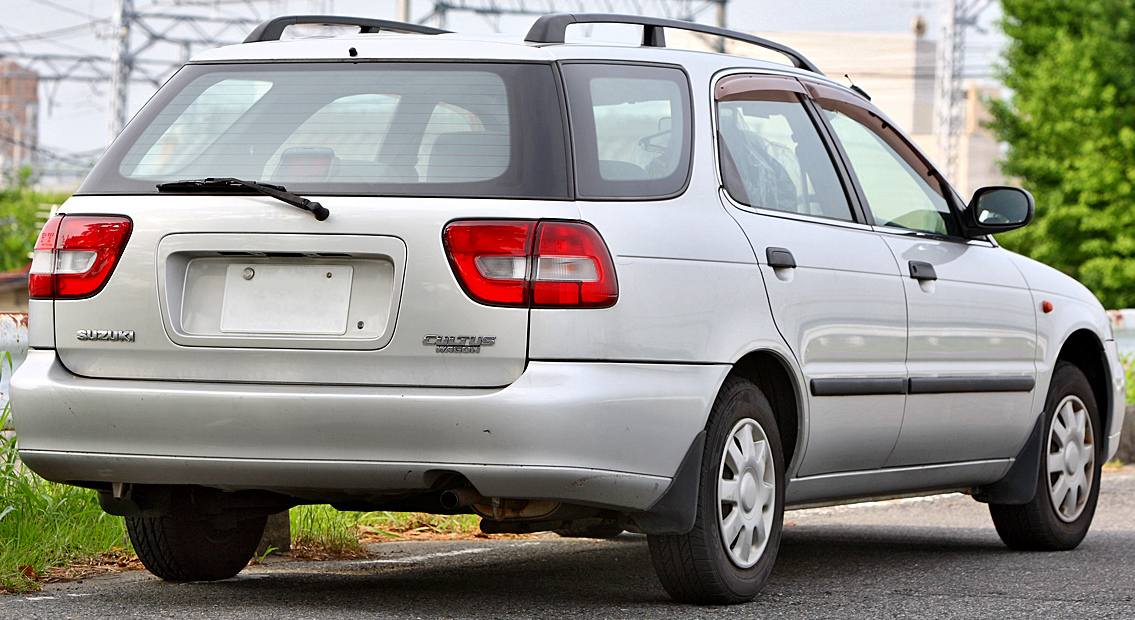
1998–2002 Suzuki Cultus Wagon (Japan)

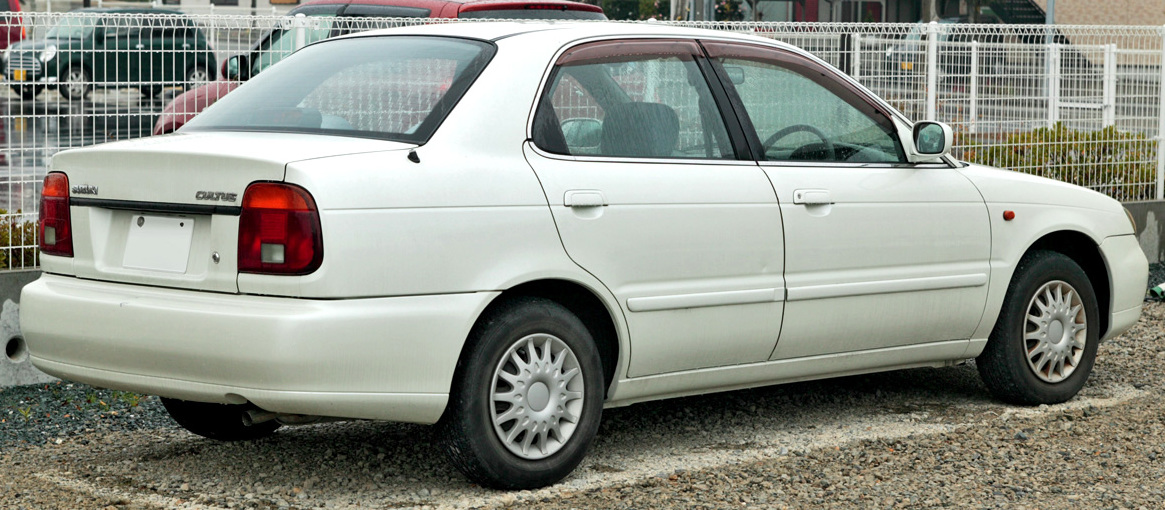
1998–2001 Suzuki Cultus sedan (Japan)

=== Australia ===
Mark 1 – SA310 / SA413 (1984–86).

Mark 2 – SF310 / SF413 / SF416 (1989–92).

Mark 3 – SF310 / SF413 / SF416 (1993–99). Corresponds to Second generation (first restyle)

Mark 1 Introduced March 1984, the SA Swift was front-wheel drive, with a solid axle and drum brakes on the rear, with front disc brakes.

- Models: GA, GL, GC, GLS and GTI.

Mark 2 New rounder body shape with mechanicals similar to the SA model and the solid rear axle replaced by a trailing arm setup.

- Models: GA, GL, GTi 3-door hatchbacks; GL and GLX Sedans, with 4WD available between 1990 and 1991.

Mark 3 Remodeled interior, revised front and rear bumper fascias. New rounded dashboard.

- Models: GA, (later replaced with the City Car), the Cino, GL and GLX Sedans, and the GTi

== Production ==
Assembly also commenced in India (Maruti Suzuki), Hungary (Magyar Suzuki), Pakistan (Pak Suzuki Motors), Indonesia (Suzuki Indomobil Motor), China (Changan Suzuki) and by General Motors in Canada and several South American countries. When production of the Swift began at Magyar Suzuki in 1992, Suzuki invested $230 million in capital for the new company and flew each of its Hungarian workers to Japan for training in its production methods. Production of the second generation cabriolet stopped in 1995, followed by three-door models in 2002. The four-door sedans were continued to be manufactured in China until 2015, while the five-door models of the second generation (under the nameplate Cultus) were manufactured in Pakistan until late 2016.

== Nameplate use with other vehicles ==
The second-generation Celerio is currently sold in Pakistan under the "Cultus" nameplate, which was launched there on 22 April 2017.

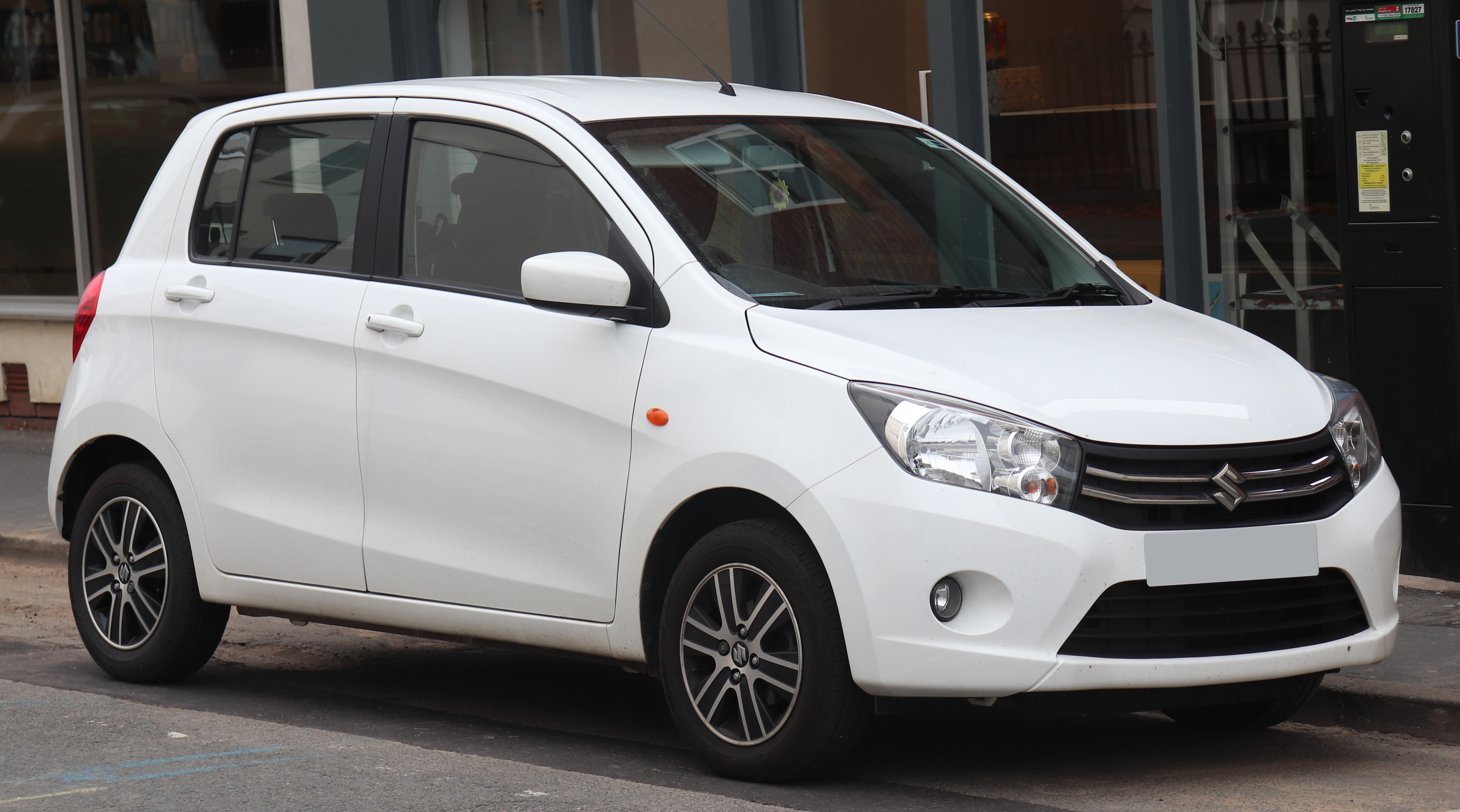
Suzuki Celerio, which is marketed as the Cultus in Pakistan

== Motorsport ==
In 1992, Nobuhiro Tajima used a heavily modified twin engined Cultus in the Pikes Peak International Hill Climb.

A Suzuki Swift GTi driven by Mark Brame and Henry Draper won the 1992 Yokohama 6-Hour for Production Cars at the Winton circuit in Victoria, Australia on 29 November 1992.
