= Q35 =

Q35 may refer to:

- Q35 (New York City bus)
- Changhe Q35, a Chinese crossover
- Fatir, the 35th surah of the Quran
- French submarine X (Q35)
- London Underground Q35 Stock
- Samsung Sens Q35, a laptop computer
- Intel Q35, an Intel chipset
