= Changhe M70 =

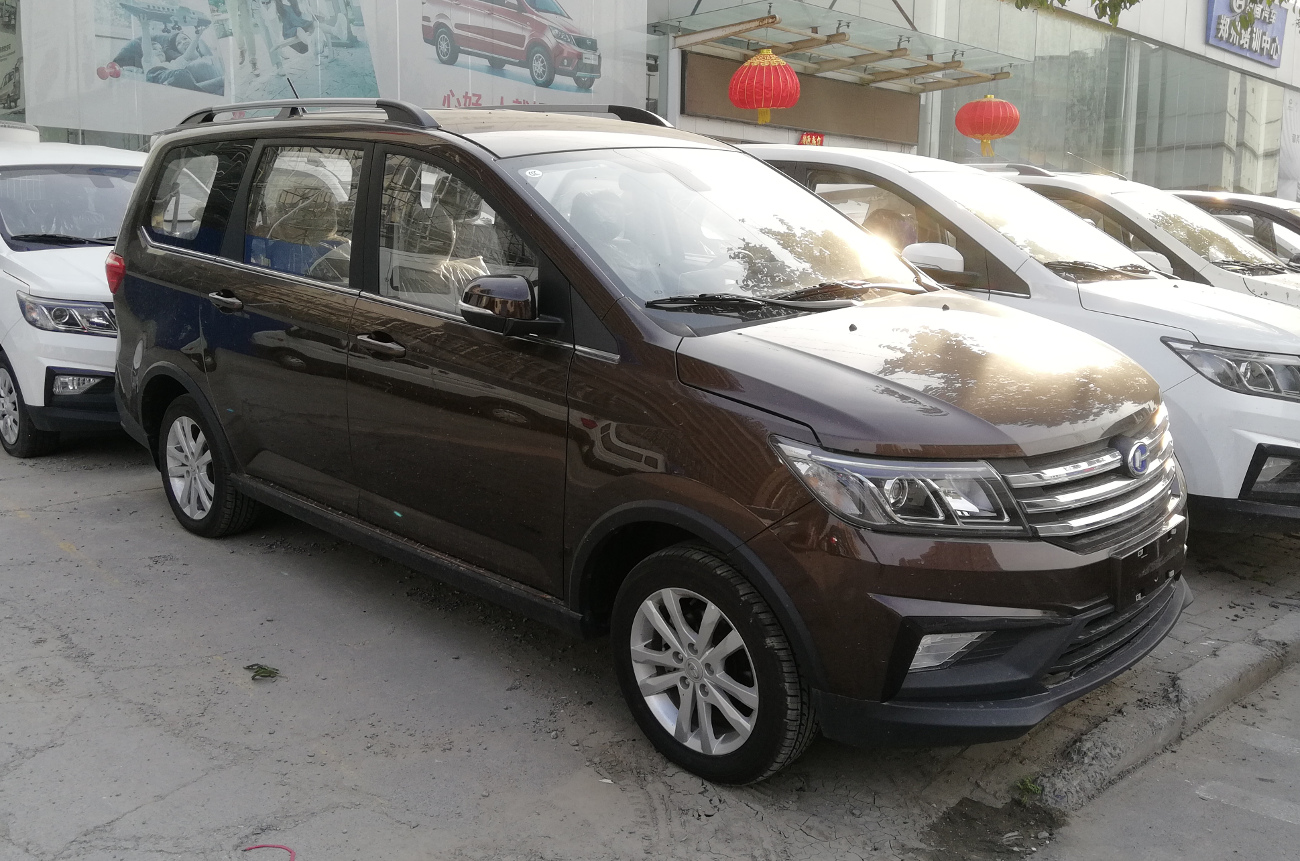

Overview
- Manufacturer: Changhe
- Production: 2016–2019

Body and chassis
- Class: MPV
- Body style: 5-door multi purpose vehicle (MPV)

Powertrain
- Engine: 1.5 L I4 gasoline
- Transmission: 5-speed manual

Dimensions
- Wheelbase: 2,810 mm (110.6 in)
- Length: 4,720 mm (185.8 in)
- Width: 1,770 mm (69.7 in)
- Height: 1,828 mm (72.0 in)

The Changhe M70 is an MPV produced by Changhe.

Since December 2016, the vehicle is being built in Jiujiang. In China, the M70, which seats up to eight, has been sold since March 2017. It competes in particular with the successful Baojun 730.
