= Changan Suzuki =

Chinese automobile manufacturer

Changan Suzuki Automobile Co., Ltd.
- Company type: joint venture
- Industry: Automotive
- Founded: June 1993 (Chongqing)
- Defunct: September 2018
- Fate: Suzuki returned its stake to Changan, but later continued manufacturing the vehicles under license.
- Headquarters: Chongqing, China
- Products: Automobiles
- Number of employees: Approximately 4,200
- Parent: Chang'an Automobile Group; Suzuki
- Website: www.changansuzuki.com (in Chinese)

Changan Suzuki (officially Changan Suzuki Automobile Co., Ltd.) was an automobile manufacturing company headquartered in Chongqing, China and a joint-venture between Chang'an Automobile Group and Suzuki. Chang'an began assembling subcompact commercial Carry ST90 trucks and microbuses under license from Suzuki in early 1980s, and in 1993 the two companies formed Chang'an Suzuki to build licensed versions of the Suzuki Alto and Suzuki Cultus. Changan Suzuki became defunct in 2018.

== History ==
Changan Suzuki was formed in June 1993 with a registered capital of US$190 million. It was the first automobile manufacturing joint venture to be established by a Japanese company in China (although Isuzu, Mazda and Nissan had already established joint-ventures for truck assembly). The first SC7080 Alto, based on the Suzuki Alto/Fronte SB308 which was originally presented in 1986, rolled off the production line in November 1995. The car had already been produced by the Changan mother concern since 1991, and continued to be built by them until 1997.

In 2010, Changan was supposed to merge its Suzuki joint venture with that of Changhe, another automaker participating in a Suzuki joint venture. An effort to sell the entire Suzuki model range at unified dealerships fell through in 2008.

By the end of 2010 Changan Suzuki had over 1,000 car dealerships across China. In July 2011, it was announced that Changan Suzuki would build a second assembly plant in Chongqing, in a two-phase project. The first phase will involve a total investment of five billion yuan (US$777 million) and expand production capacity of vehicles and engines by 150,000 units each. Construction of the plant began in April 2012.

On 4 September 2018, Suzuki transferred its 50 percent stake in Changan Suzuki to Chang'an Automobile Group, ending 25 years of joint venture. Chang'an would continue to make and sell Suzuki-branded cars in China under a license.

In 2021, Changan Suzuki was renamed to Chongqing Lingyao Automobile.

== Models ==
- Suzuki Alivio (2014–2018)
- Suzuki Alto (1995–2018)
- Suzuki Swift (2005–2018)
- Suzuki SX4 Hatch (2007–2018)
- Suzuki SX4 Sedan (2006–2015)
- Suzuki S-Cross (2013–2018)
- Suzuki Vitara (2015–2018)
- Suzuki Lingyang (1999–2015)
- Suzuki SC7081C Happy Prince (2001–2008)
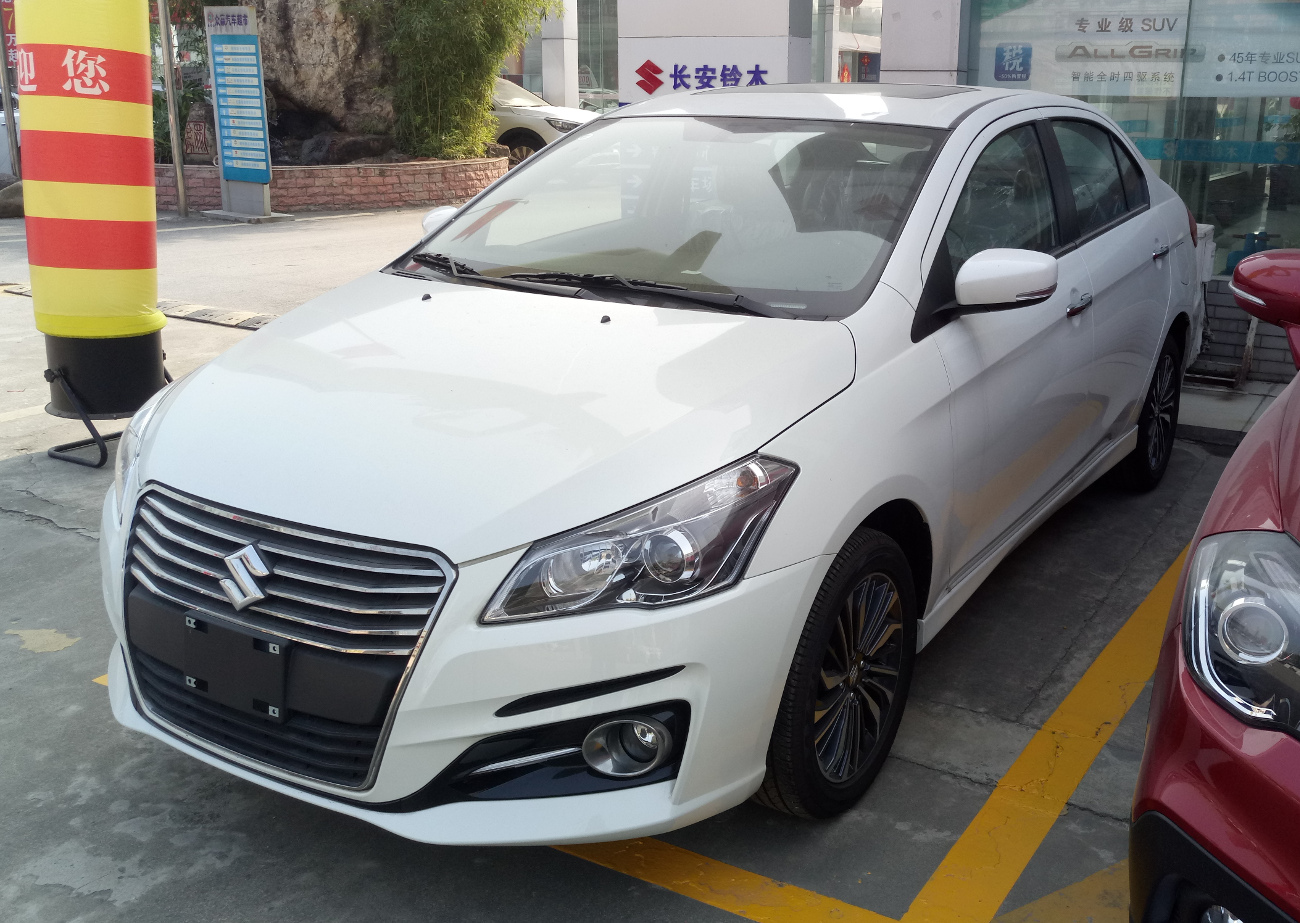
Suzuki Alivio

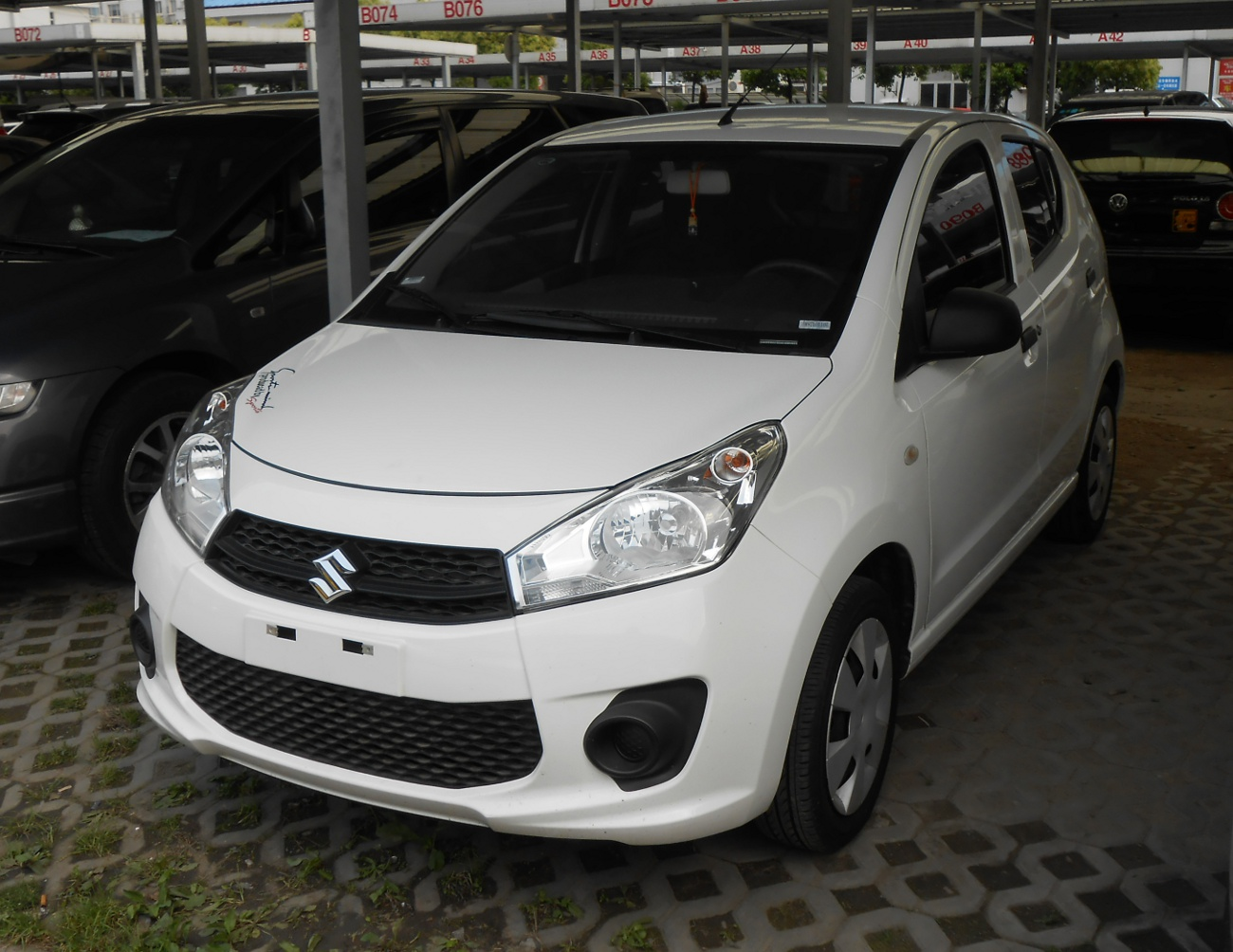
Suzuki Alto

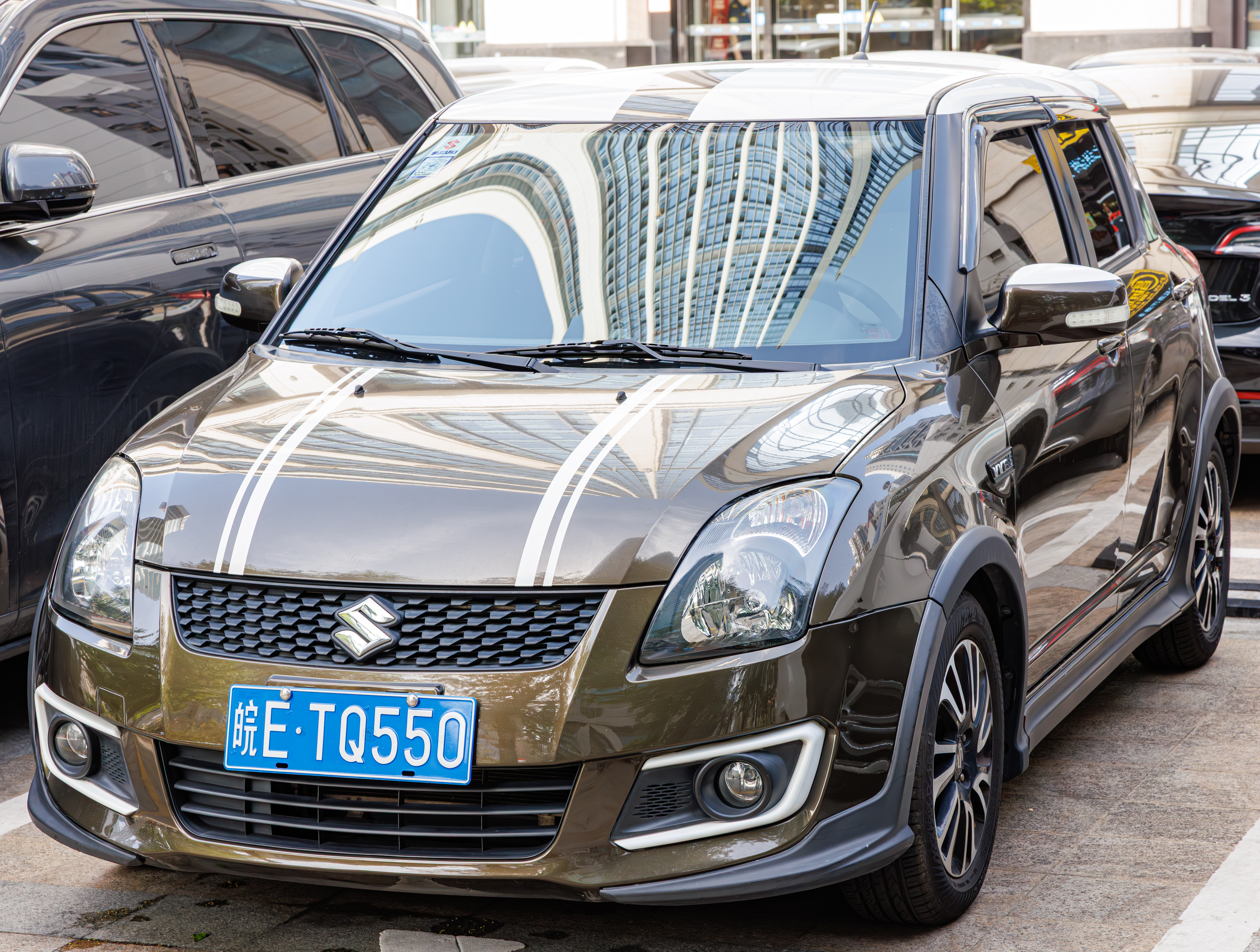
Suzuki Swift

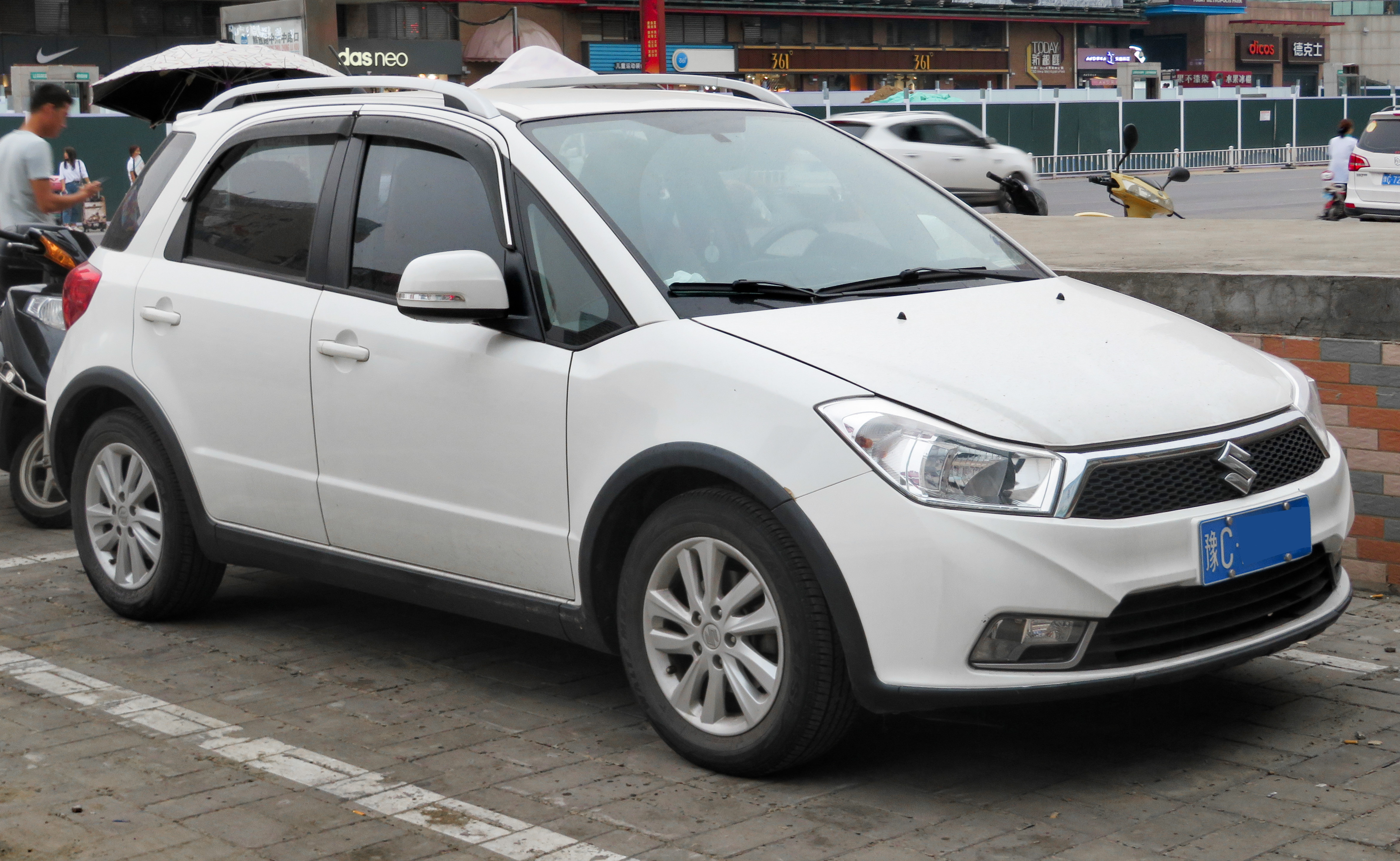
Suzuki SX4 Hatch

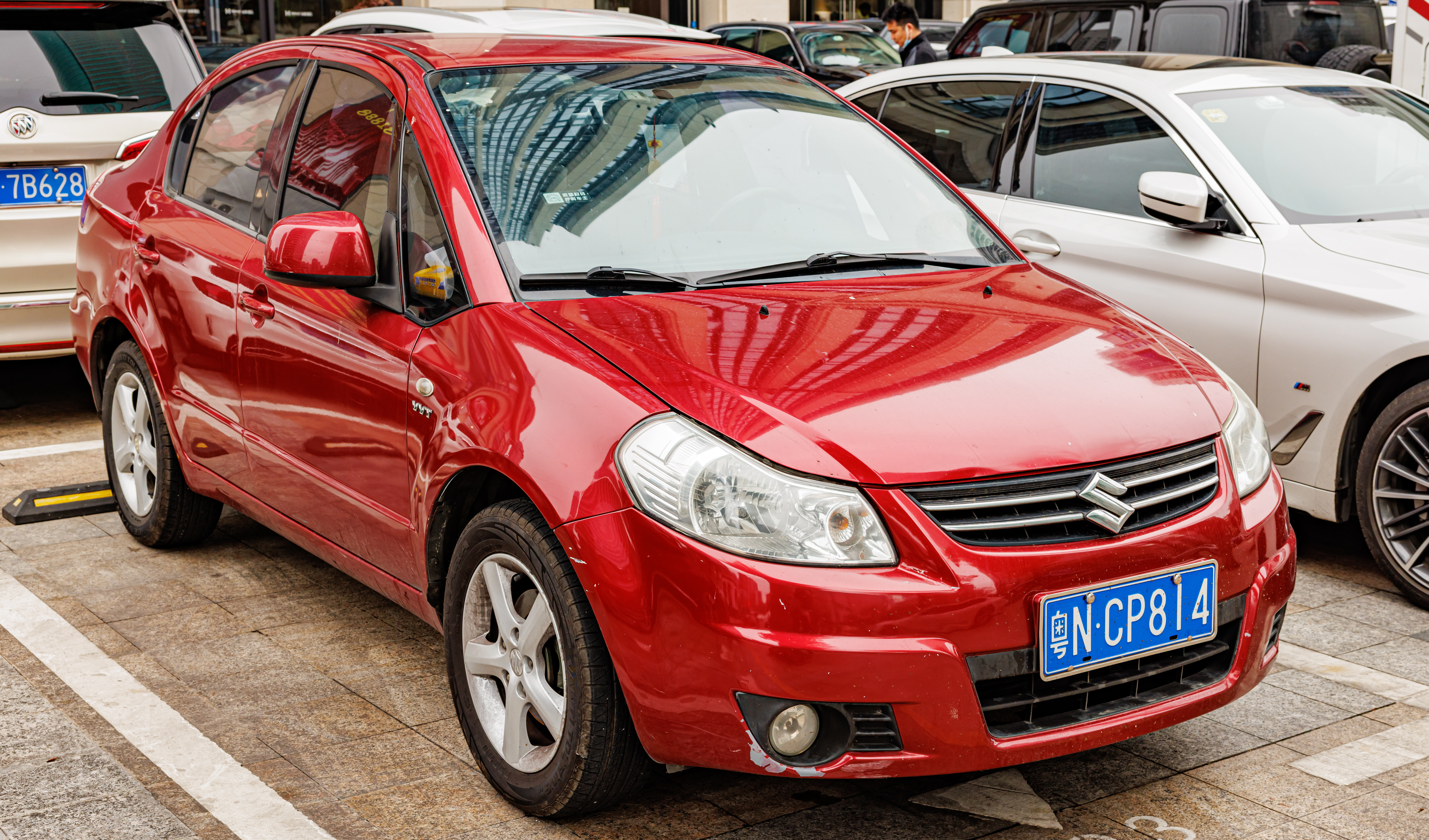
Suzuki SX4 Sedan

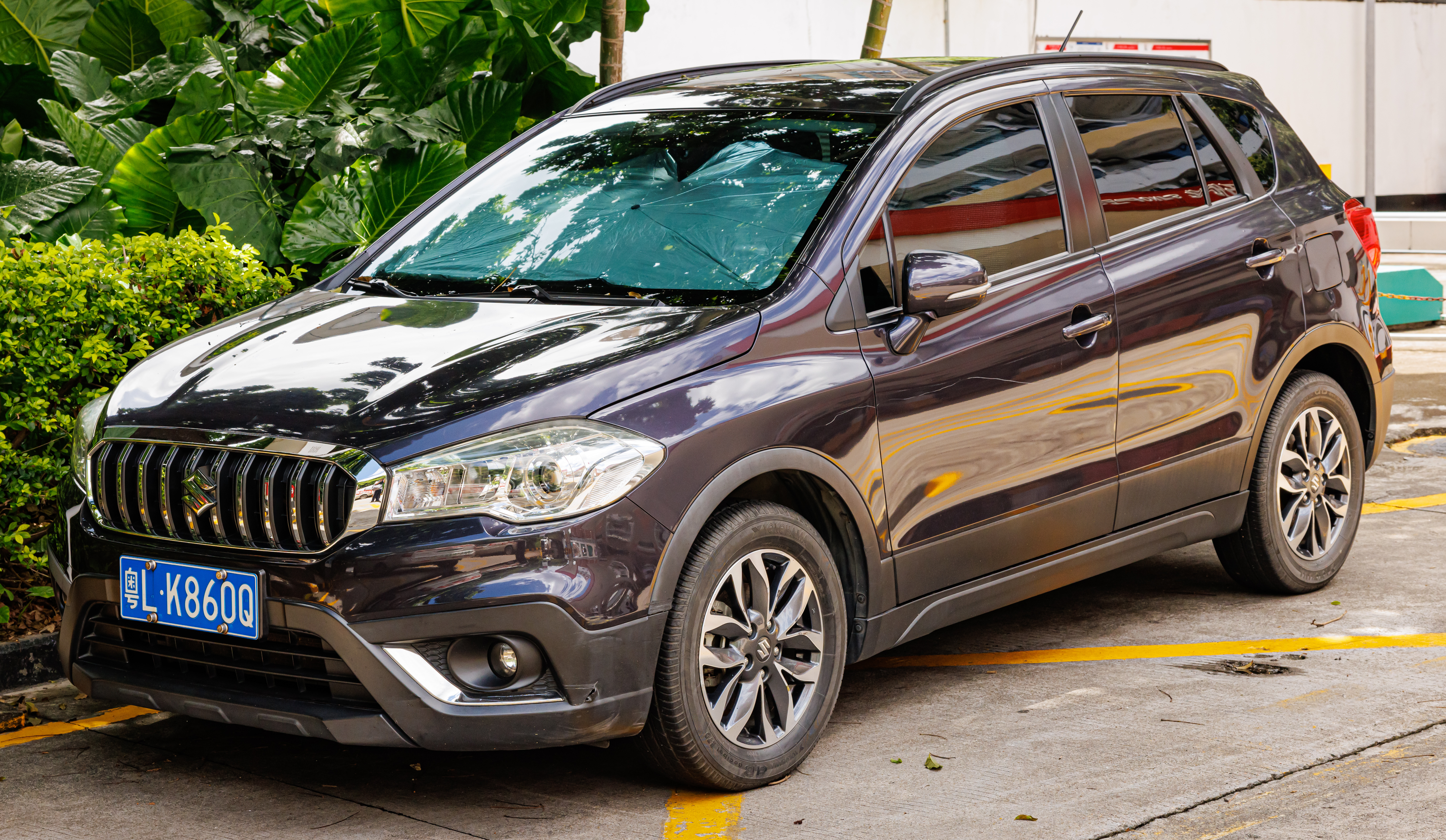
Suzuki S-Cross

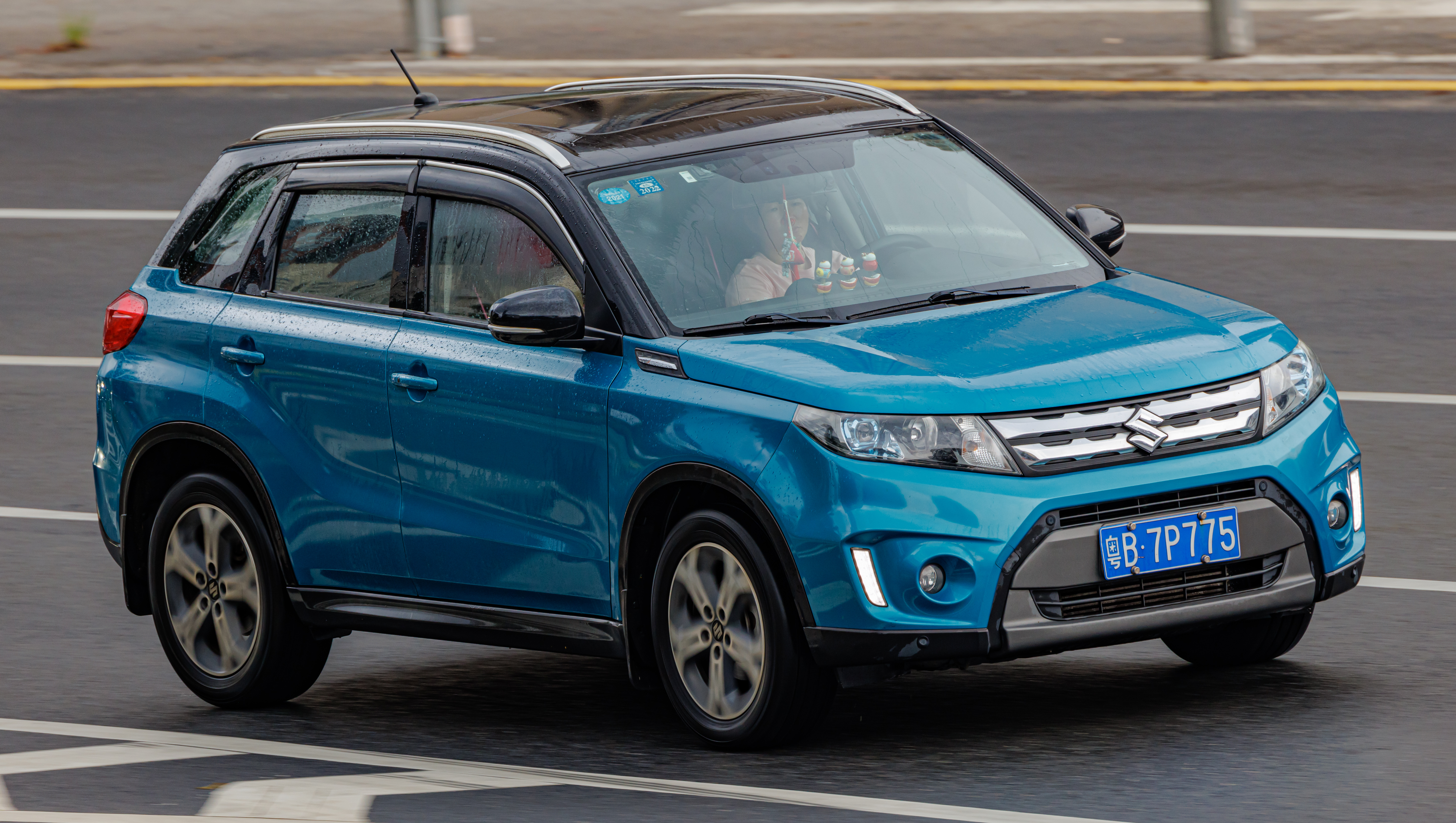
Suzuki Vitara

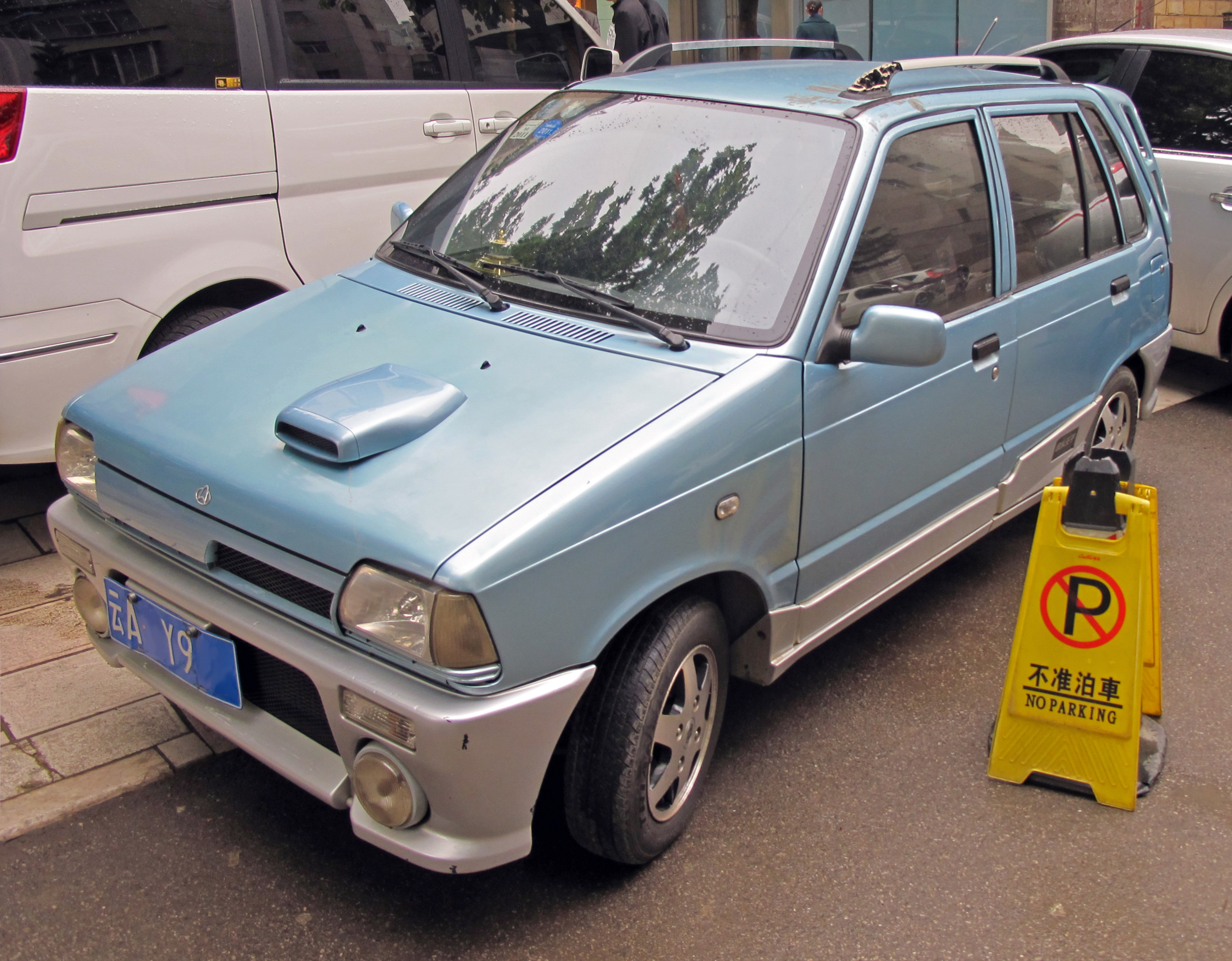
Chang'an Suzuki SC7081C Happy Prince (Suzuki Alto-based)

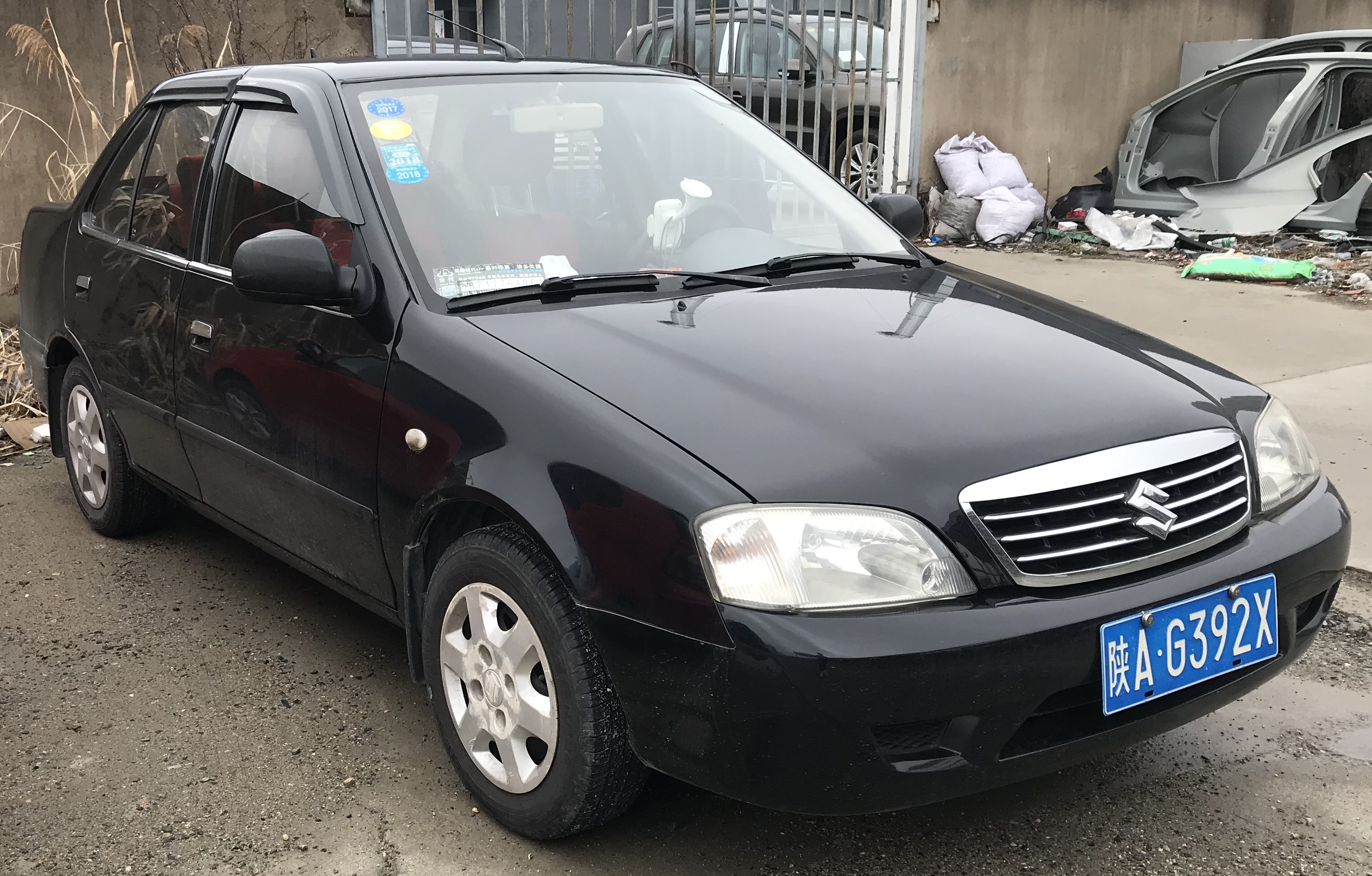
Chang'an Suzuki SC7130 Lingyang (Gazelle, Antelope) (Suzuki Cultus-based)

== Sales ==
Changan Suzuki built a total of 107,337 cars in 2004.

In 2009 sales were up to 150,069 vehicles.
