= Chana Star S460 =

Chinese automobile

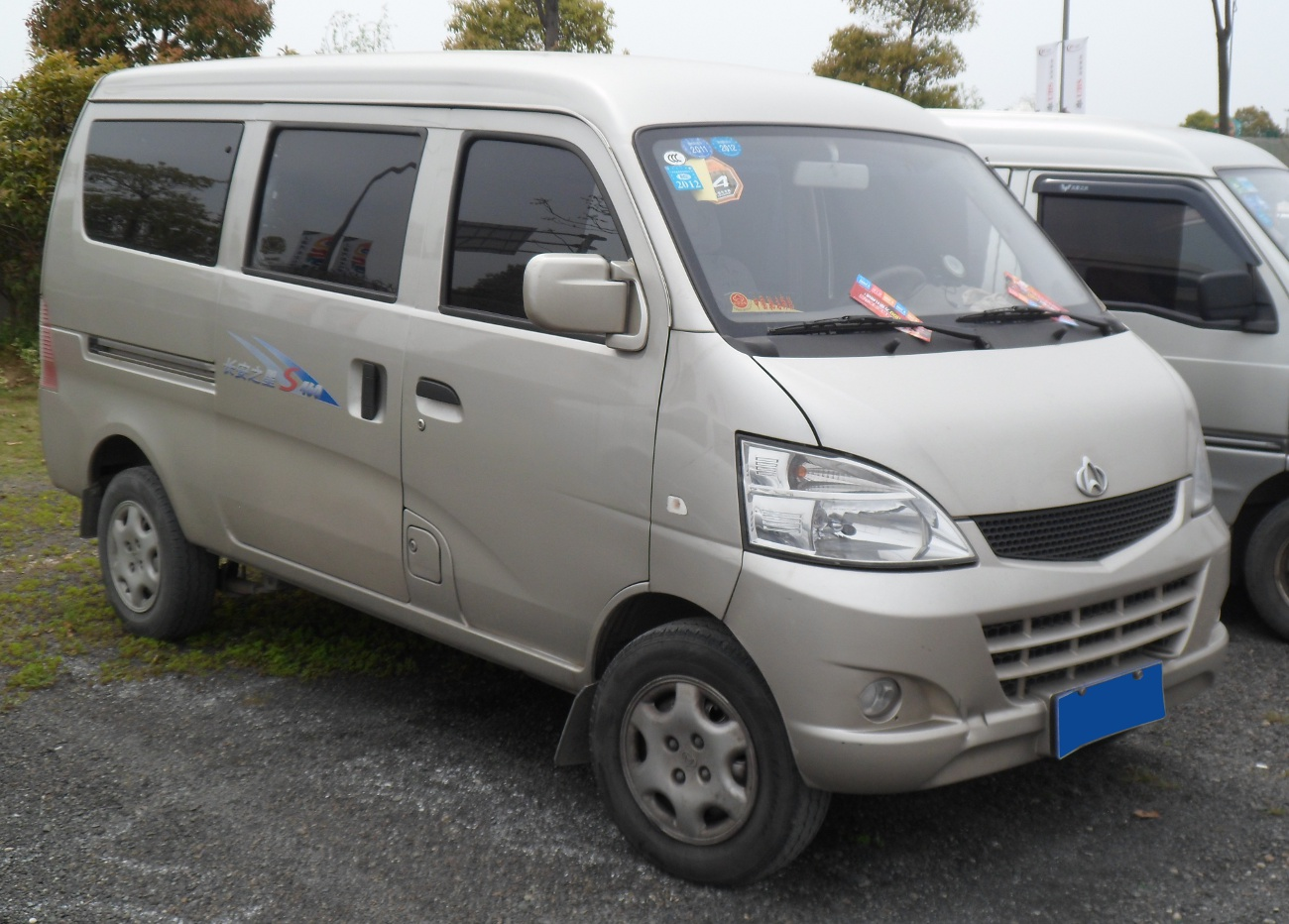
- Chana Star S460

Overview
- Manufacturer: Changan Automobile
- Also called: Kuayue Chana V3; Changhe Fuyun; Hafei Junyi
- Production: 2008–2015
- Model years: 2009–2015

Body and chassis
- Class: Microvan
- Body style: 5-door wagon
- Layout: Mid-engine, rear-wheel-drive
- Related: CMC Veryca

Powertrain
- Engine: 1.0 L I4 (petrol); 1.3 L I4 (petrol)
- Transmission: 5-speed manual

Dimensions
- Wheelbase: 2,605 mm (102.6 in)
- Length: 3,995 mm (157.3 in)
- Width: 1,645 mm (64.8 in)
- Height: 1,910 mm (75.2 in)

The Chana Star S460 (Chinese: 长安之星S460) is a microvan produced by Changan Automobile under the Chana sub-brand.

== Overview ==
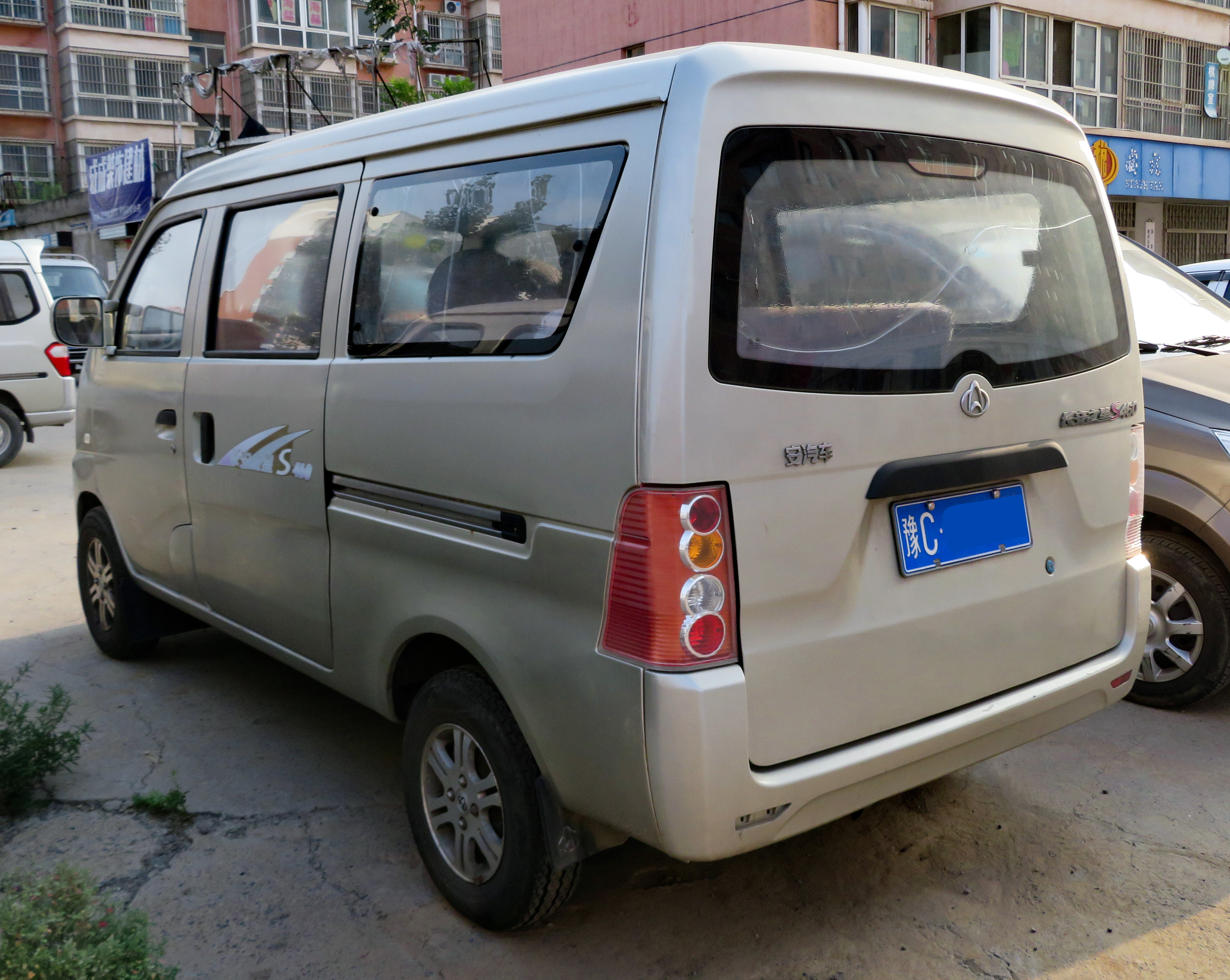
Chana Star S460 (rear)

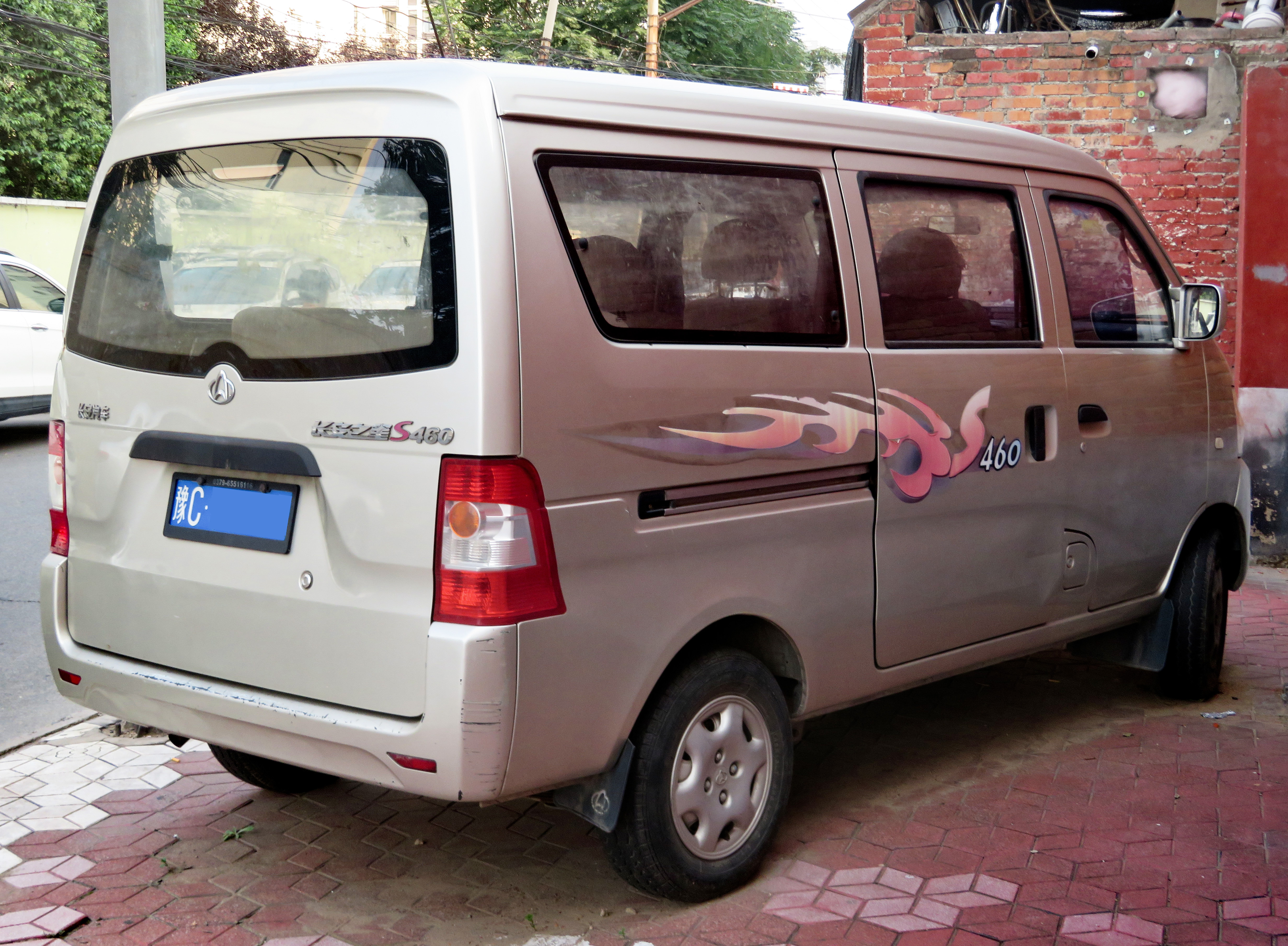
Chana Star S460 (facelift)

The Chana Star S460 was released by Changan Automobile in 2008. The Chana Star S460 microvan is powered by two engines, including an 82 kW 1.3-liter engine and a 1.0-liter engine. Prices for the Star S460 ranges from 35,500 yuan to 47,900 yuan.

== Kuayue Chana V3 ==
After the discontinuation of the Chana Star S460, an extended production of the rebadged version was produced by Chongqing Kuayue Automobile Co., Ltd and sold under the Changan Kuayue sub-brand as the Kuayue Chana V3. The Kuayue Chana V3 is essentially the same vehicle as the pre-facelift Star S460 minus the redesigned front end.

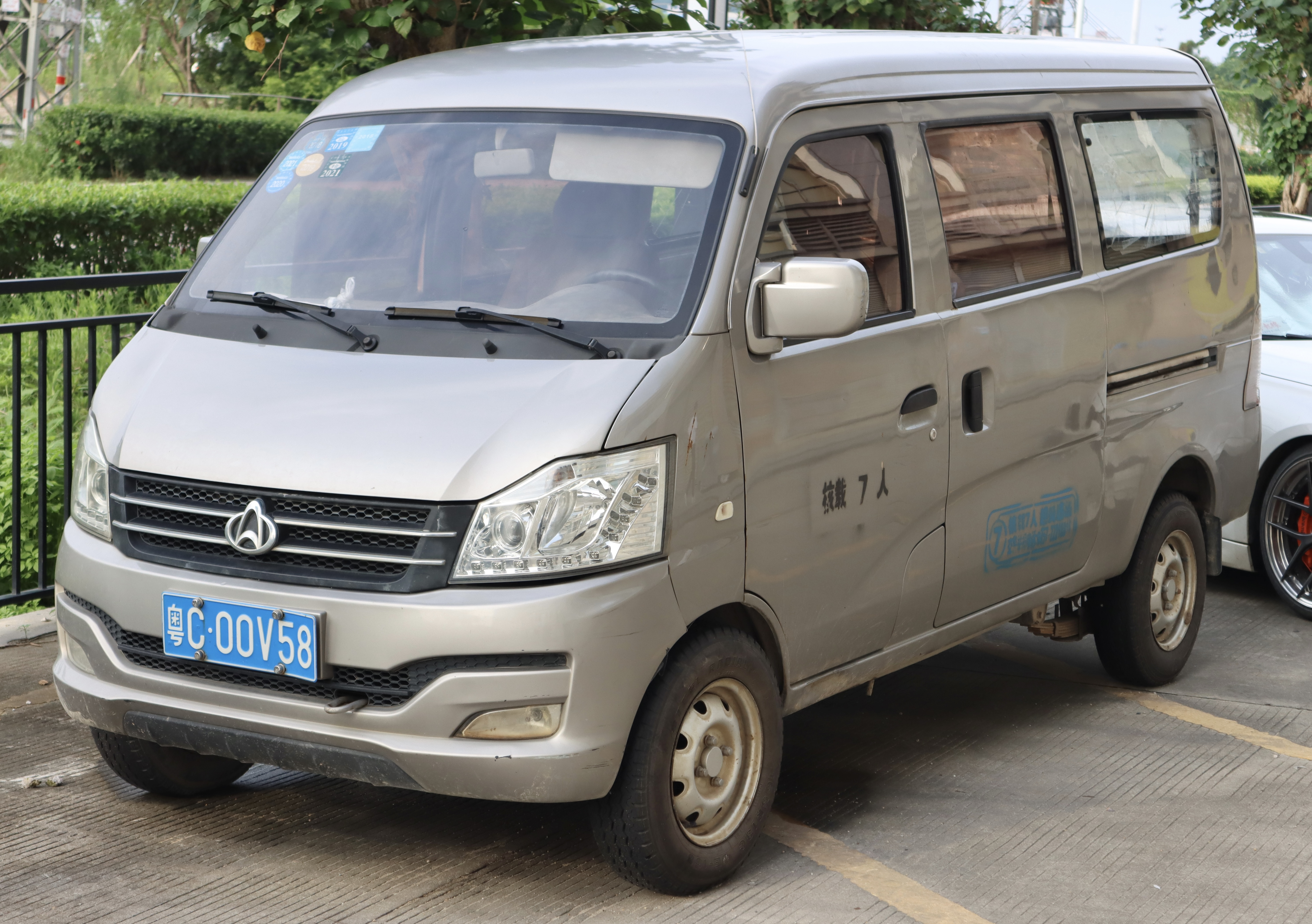
Kuayue Chana V3 (front view)

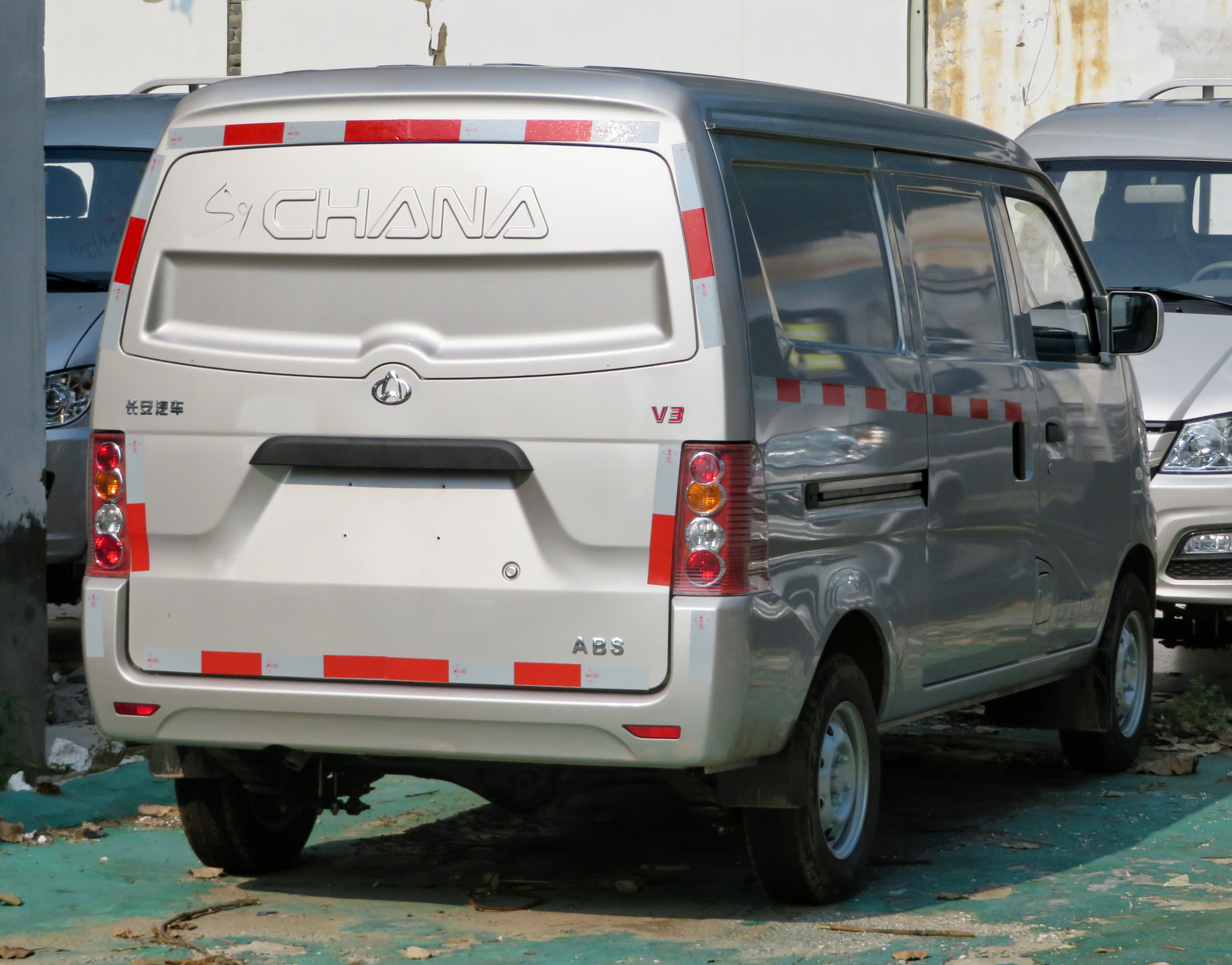
Kuayue Chana V3 panel van (rear view)

== Changhe Fuyun ==
The Changhe Fuyun (Chinese: 昌河福运) is a rebadged version of the Chana Star S460 by Changhe sold from 39,800 to 41,800 yuan.

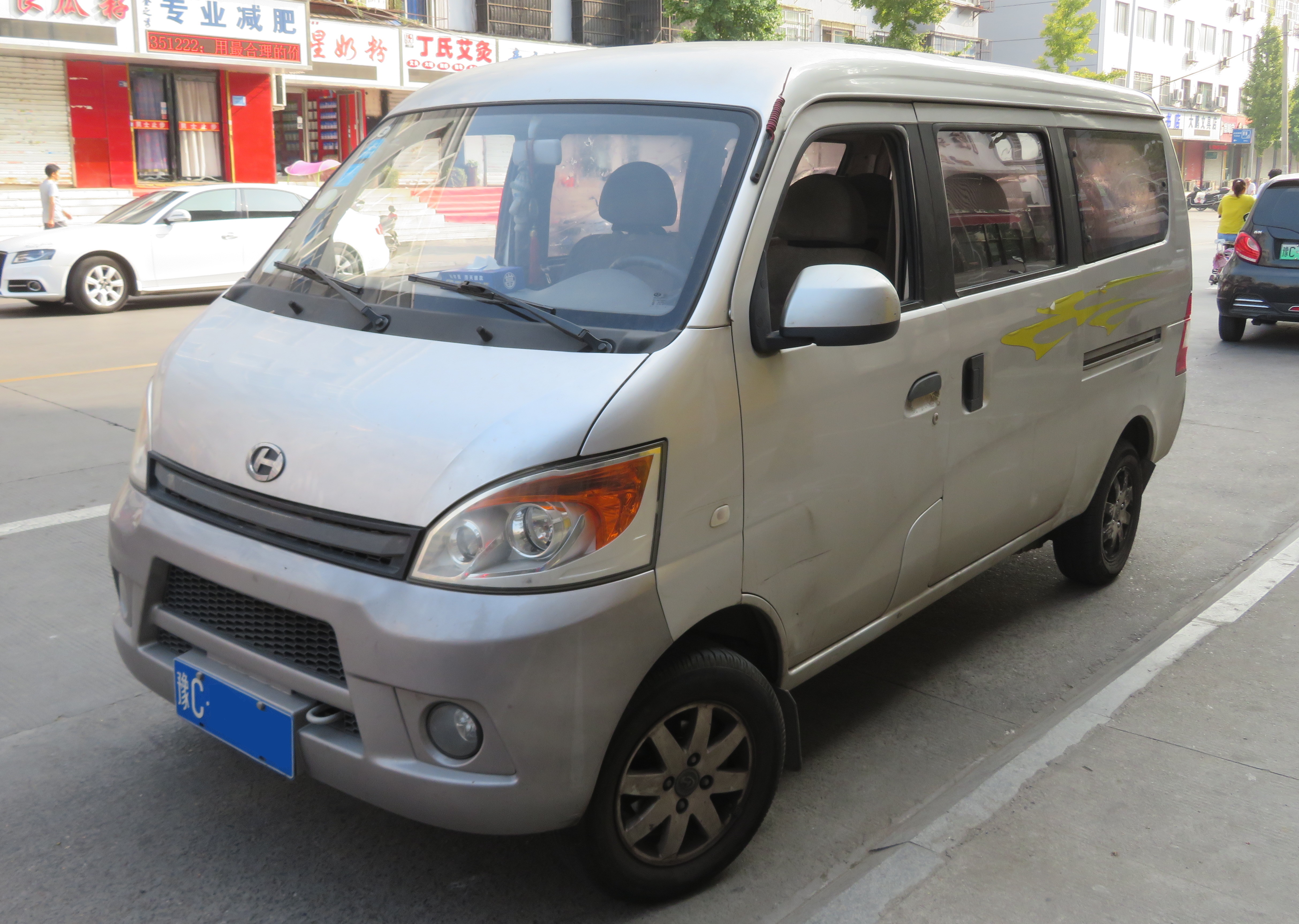
Changhe Fuyun front

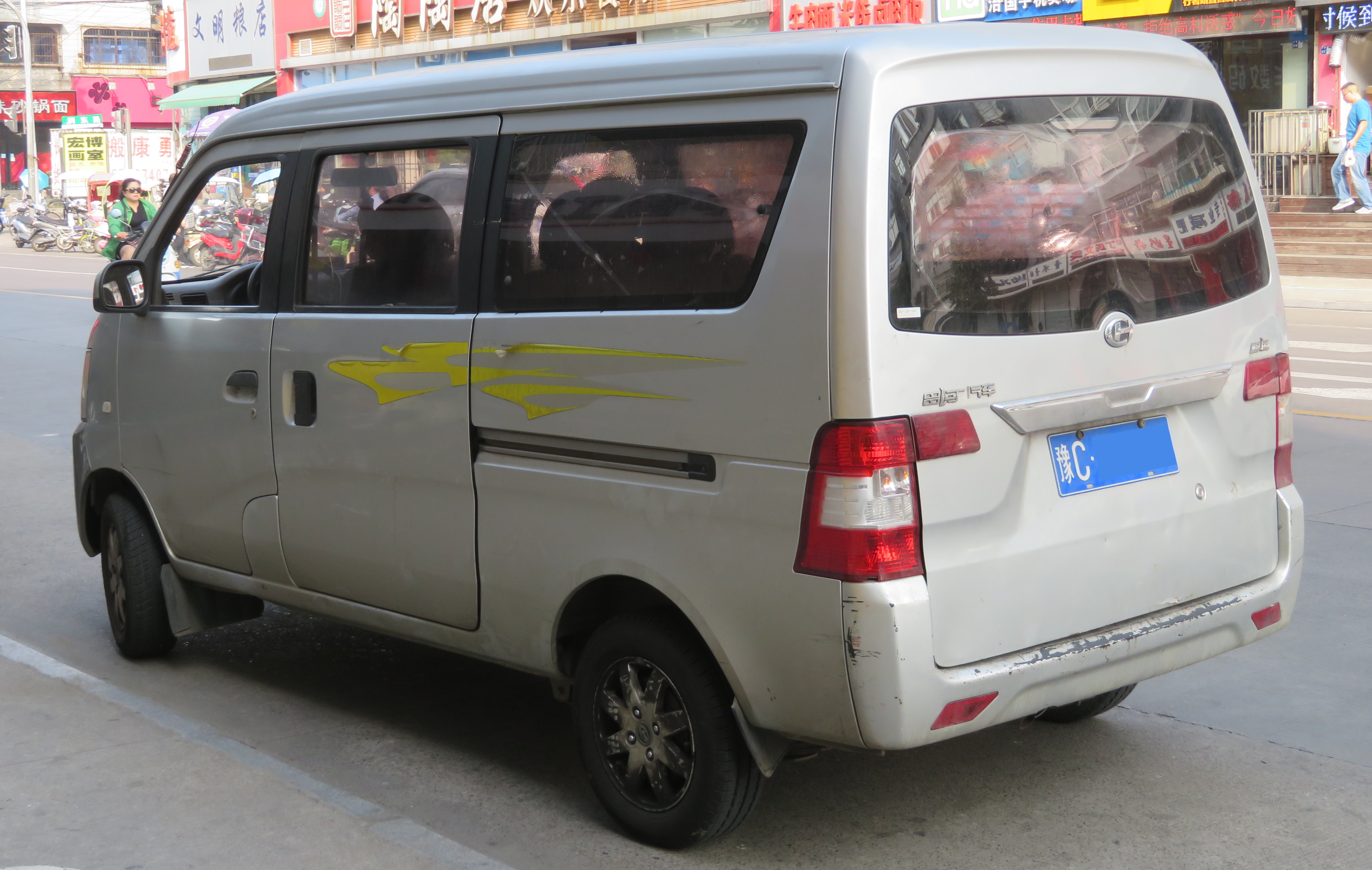
Changhe Fuyun rear

== Hafei Junyi ==
A badge engineered model called the Hafei Junyi (Chinese: 哈飞骏意) was launched in 2011, a year after Changan became the owner of Hafei. The Junyi features a redesigned front end and slightly revised rear, with the wheelbase unchanged, the revised length was shortened to 4025mm, width narrowed down to 1645mm, and height lowered to 1910mm. The Junyi is available with a 1.3 liter engine producing 99 hp and 120Nm of torque.

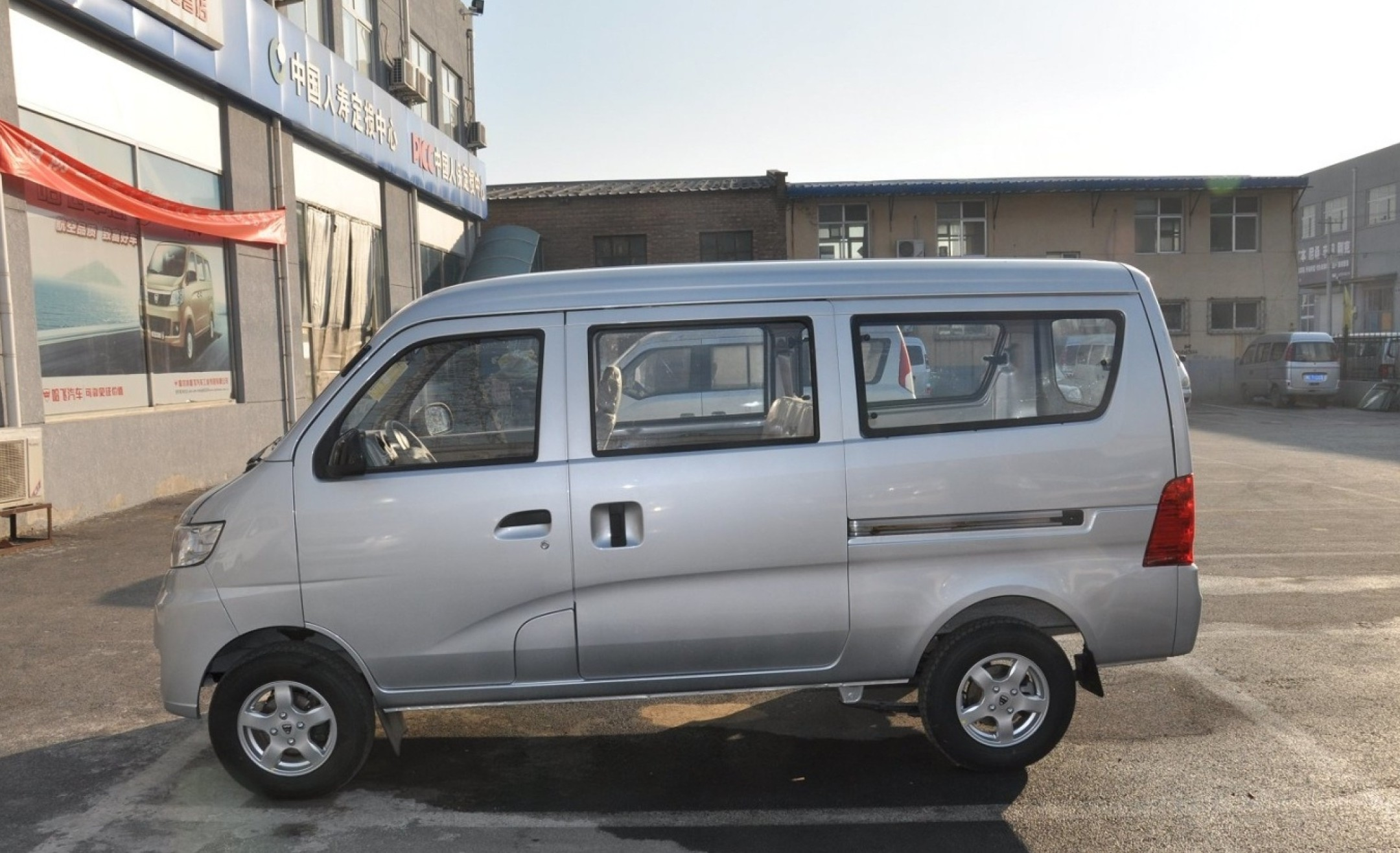
Hafei Junyi side
