= Changhe Freedom M70 =

Chinese MPV

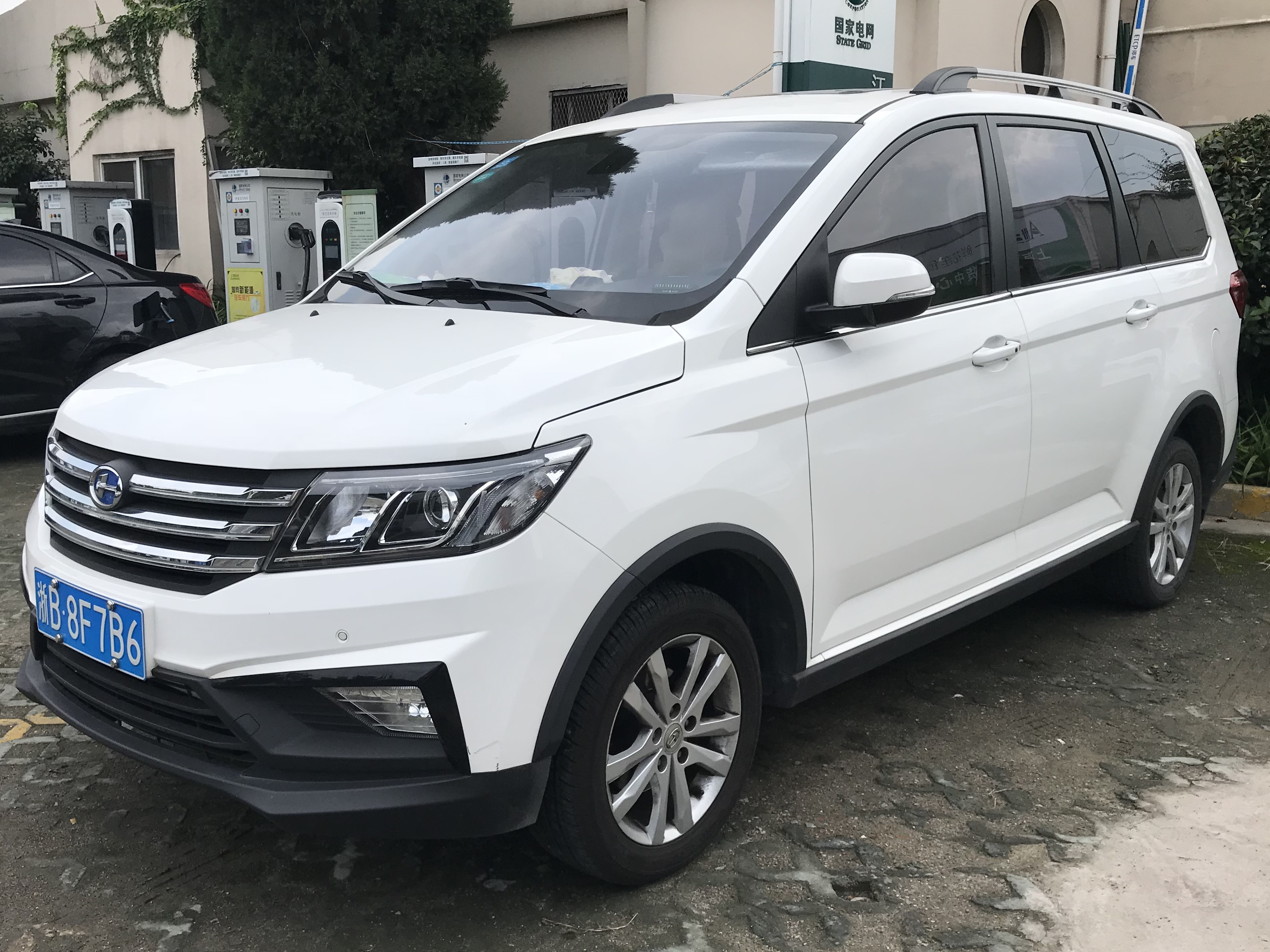

Overview
- Manufacturer: BAIC Group
- Also called: Changhe M70
- Production: 2016–2019

Body and chassis
- Class: Multi-purpose vehicle (M)
- Body style: 5-door van
- Layout: Mid-engine, rear-wheel drive

Powertrain
- Engine: 1.5L I4
- Transmission: 5 speed manual

Dimensions
- Wheelbase: 2,810 mm (110.6 in) (M50F)
- Length: 4,720 mm (185.8 in)
- Width: 1,770 mm (69.7 in)
- Height: 1,800–1,828 mm (70.9–72.0 in)
- Curb weight: 1,435 kg (3,164 lb)

The Changhe Freedom M70 is an MPV manufactured by Changhe, a sub-brand of BAIC.

== Overview ==
The Changhe Freedom M70 was revealed in 2016 with prices ranging from 54,900 yuan to 64,900 yuan, while the Changhe Freedom M70 was available on the market from March 2017.

=== Specifications ===
The Changhe Freedom M70 is powered by a 1.5-litre engine mated to a 5-speed manual transmission. It is available with 5-, 7- and 8-seater configurations.

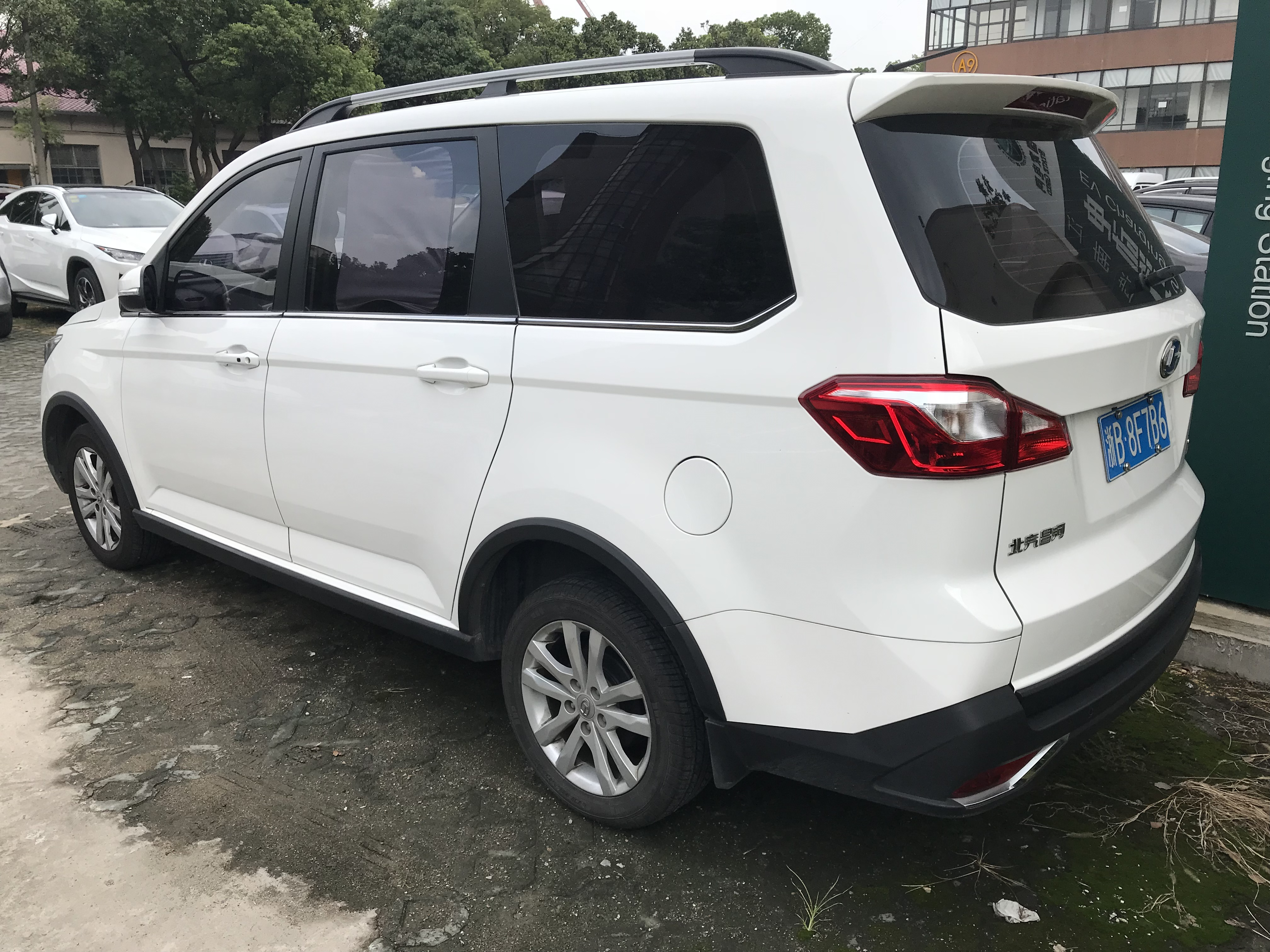
Changhe Freedom M70 rear
