= Changhe =

Chinese automobile manufacturer

Jiangxi Changhe Automobile Co Ltd
- Type: Subsidiary
- Founded: 1970
- Defunct: 2022
- Headquarters: Jingdezhen, Jiangxi, China
- Area served: China
- Parent: BAIC (70%), Jiangxi Provincial State-owned Enterprise Assets Operation (Holdings) Co. (30%)
- Website: changheauto.com

Jiangxi Changhe Automobile Co Ltd
- Simplified Chinese: 江西昌河汽车有限责任公司
- Traditional Chinese: 江西昌河汽車有限責任公司
Transcriptions
Standard Mandarin
- Hanyu Pinyin: Jiāngxī Chānghé Qìchē Yǒuxiàn Zérèn Gōngsī

Changhe, officially Jiangxi Changhe Automobile Co Ltd, was a Chinese automobile manufacturer based in Jingdezhen, Jiangxi province, China.

Making cars and microvans, small trucks and vans for commercial purposes, Changhe had an estimated 200,000 (227,000 to 260,000) units/year production capacity as of 2010. Production capacity figures considered engines and vehicles as discrete. In the last period of company's existence, it was a majority-owned subsidiary of a large, state-owned automaker, BAIC, Changhe was previously engaged in a joint venture with Suzuki Motor Corporation of Japan. In 2022 all products have been discontinued and the company's website ceased to be available after May.

== History ==
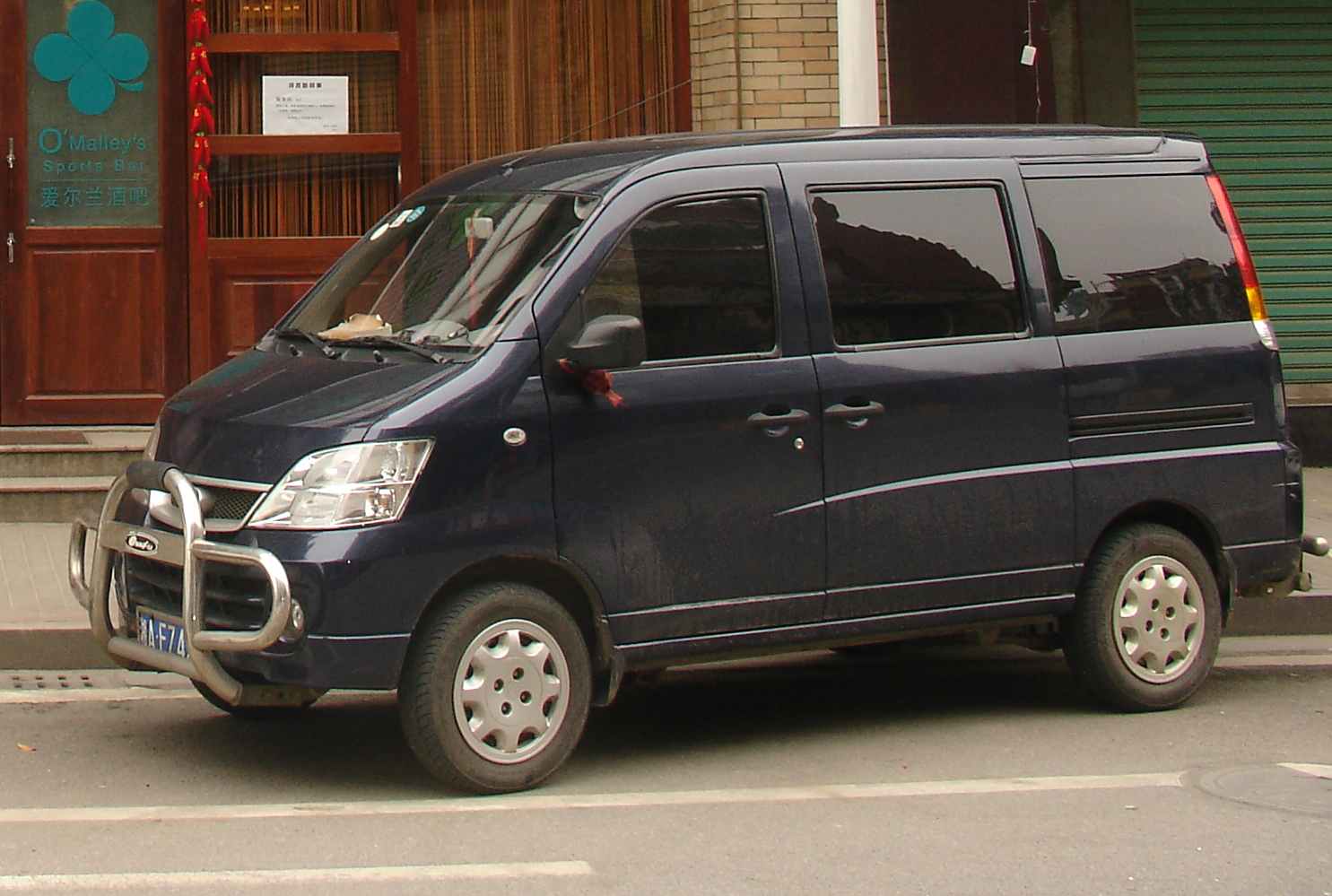
Changhe CH6390 "Freedom" (aka Friend) microvan

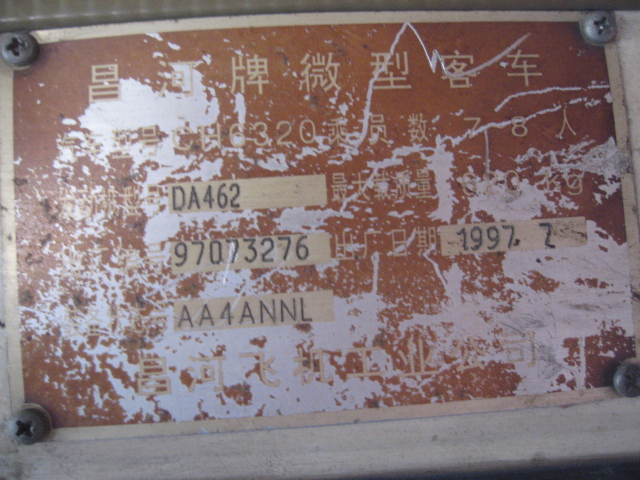
The nameplate of a 1997-built Changhe CH6320 microvan, with the manufacturer labeled as "Changhe Aircraft Industries Corporation".

A subsidiary of the Aviation Industry Corporation of China (AVIC) until 2010, perhaps it was the dictate of the Chinese government that prompted a large, state-owned automaker to take Changhe under its wing in a 2009 merger. Between that year and 2013, Chang'an held ownership of the company but was unable to boost growth prompting another merger with a more competent, state-owned partner, BAIC.

Having always been a smaller, dynamic vehicle manufacturer, Changhe was well established by 1973, the year trial production of buses began. Originally only making buses, the introduction of a small passenger vehicle (the Suzuki Carry ST90V) began in 1982 and sparked a long relationship with this Japanese automaker. Currently, Changhe companies make both Suzuki and Changhe-branded vehicles. In 1995, it entered a legal partnership with Suzuki forming a joint venture, Jiangxi Changhe-Suzuki Automobile Co Ltd. This JV does not make all the Suzuki-branded automobiles sold on the Chinese market as some are produced by another Chinese joint venture, Changan Suzuki. Imported models are marketed by Suzuki Motor (China) Investment Co Ltd.

Suzuki may currently be unhappy with its Chinese partners. Despite being an early entrant in the Chinese auto market, this Japanese company has lackluster sales in the country. Suzuki's efforts to change the situation by merging its two joint ventures—since Chinese business law does not allow any foreign company more than two—have so far been stymied by its Chinese partners, who instead hope Suzuki will improve their situation. The Chinese state may also not want new foreign-Chinese joint auto-making ventures at this time. An effort to sell the entire Suzuki model range at unified dealerships fell through in 2008. (This may have been tried again in 2010.)

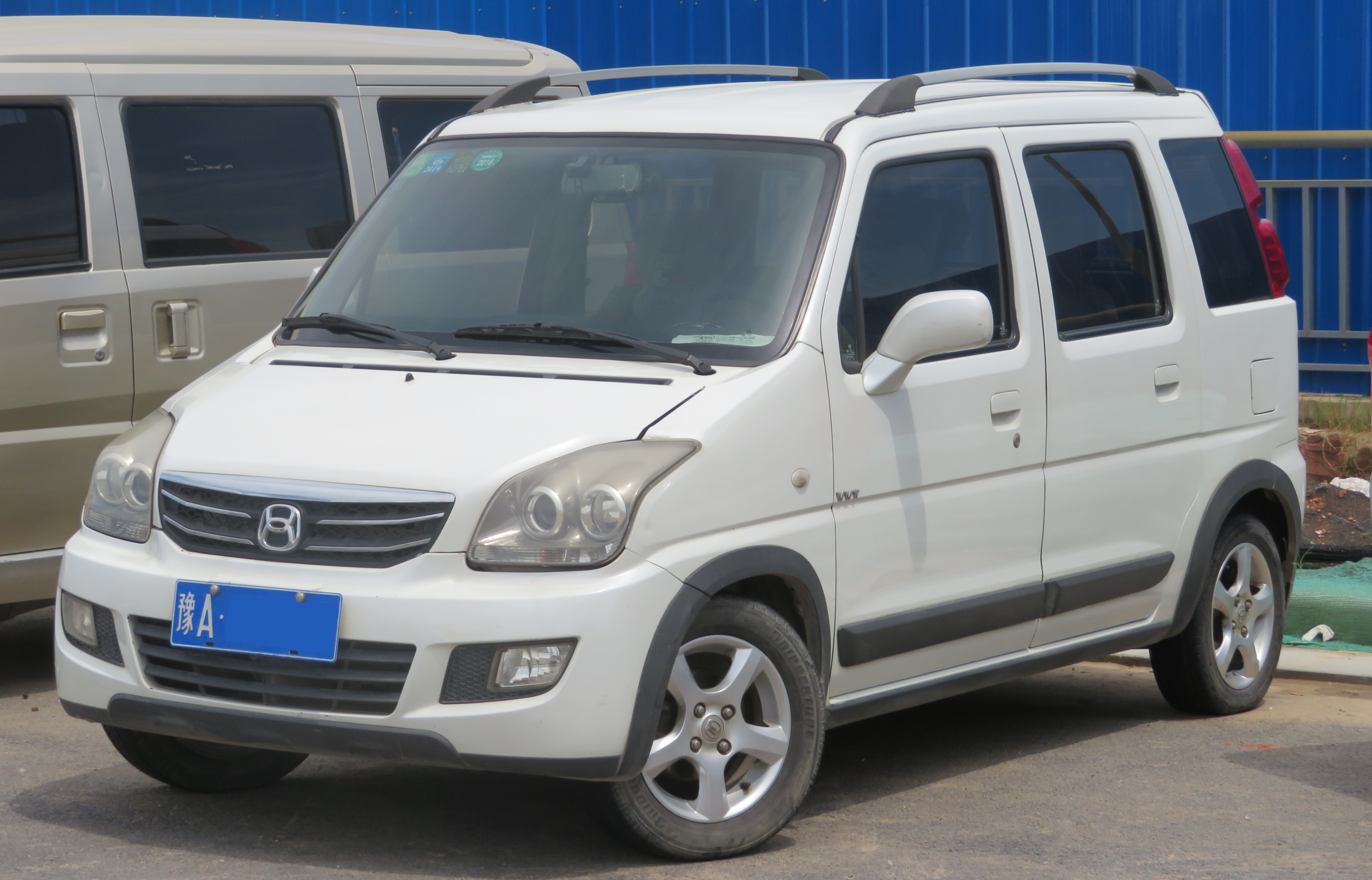
Changhe-Suzuki Beidouxing X5

Changhe-Suzuki's first products were versions of the Suzuki Carry microvans and trucks. As of 2010, microvan products include the Suzuki Wagon R (called the Big Dipper and in Chinese: 北斗星) and the newer Suzuki Landy (Chinese: 浪迪; pinyin: Làngdí). In 2006, Changhe themselves introduced the new microvan CH6390 Freedom (also called Friend), which has Suzuki underpinnings but a Changhe-designed body.

While microvans continue to be a core product, several recently introduced small cars have expanded the company's offerings. These include the subcompact Changhe Ideal (first seen in October 2003), a self-developed car albeit with styling by Bertone and some Suzuki technology. The Suzuki Liana (Chinese: 利亚纳; pinyin: Lìyǎnà) is also offered. While lower-end Changhes depend on common, Chinese-built engines also used by a variety of other local brands, Changhe builds the Suzuki K12B and K14B engines for use in higher-end versions. These have seen use in a variety of Changhe products, including the Suzuki Wagon R, Liana, and Landy, as well as the Freedom and Ideal. The brand was completely discontinued in 2022.

=== Export ===
Changhe has exported to some European and South American nations. These exports may be in the form of complete knock-down kits and are likely fitful and sporadic.

==== Latin America ====
Some Changhe models are sold in Brazil and Uruguay under the brand name Effa, and here the Ideal has been renamed the M100. Total Brazilian sales of the Ideal in 2010 were a reported 426 units. In Venezuela, the first Latin American country to receive a Changhe product (2007), the official dealer of the Changhe Ideal was Cinascar, but this model is no longer listed on Cinascar's website. In Peru and/or Colombia, Faga Motors sells various Changhe microvans.

==== Europe ====
Italian importer Martin Motors rebadges and sells the Changhe Landy as a Martin Motors Coolcar. The Ideal is known in Italy as the Martin Ideal 1000.

The Ideal is also marketed in Ukraine.

=== IPO ===
Listed on the Shanghai Stock Exchange or Shenzhen Stock Exchange in 2001, Changhe was delisted in 2008 prior to its 2009 sale.

== All models ==
=== Former models ===
- Changhe Ideal
- Changhe Freedom
- Changhe Freedom M50
- Changhe Freedom M60
- Changhe Freedom M70
- Changhe Fuyun
- Changhe Haitun
- Changhe Q25
- Changhe Q35
- Changhe Q7
- Changhe Changlingwang (CH6353)/ Changhe CH6321B
- Changhe A6
- Changhe Beidouxing
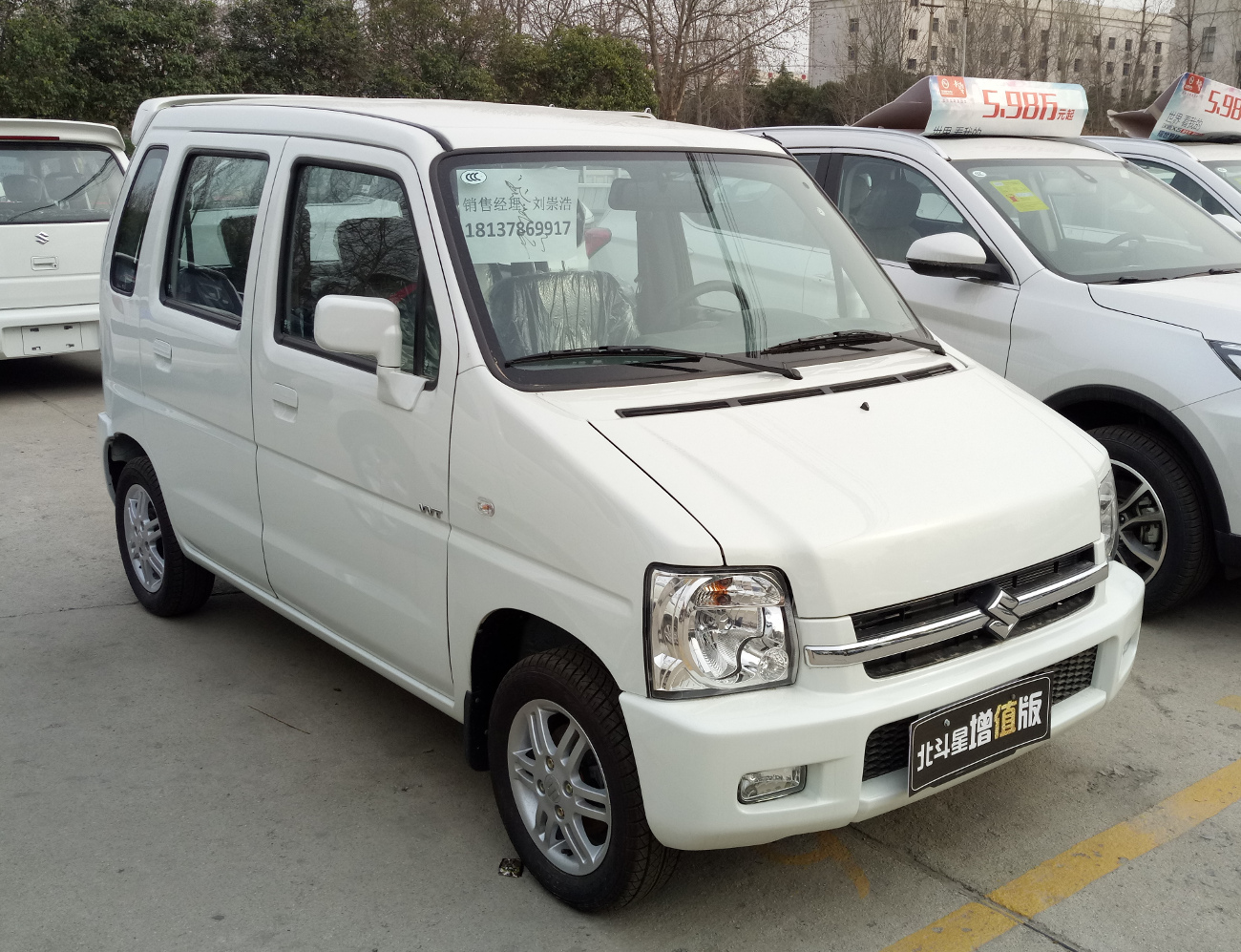
Changhe Beidouxing I

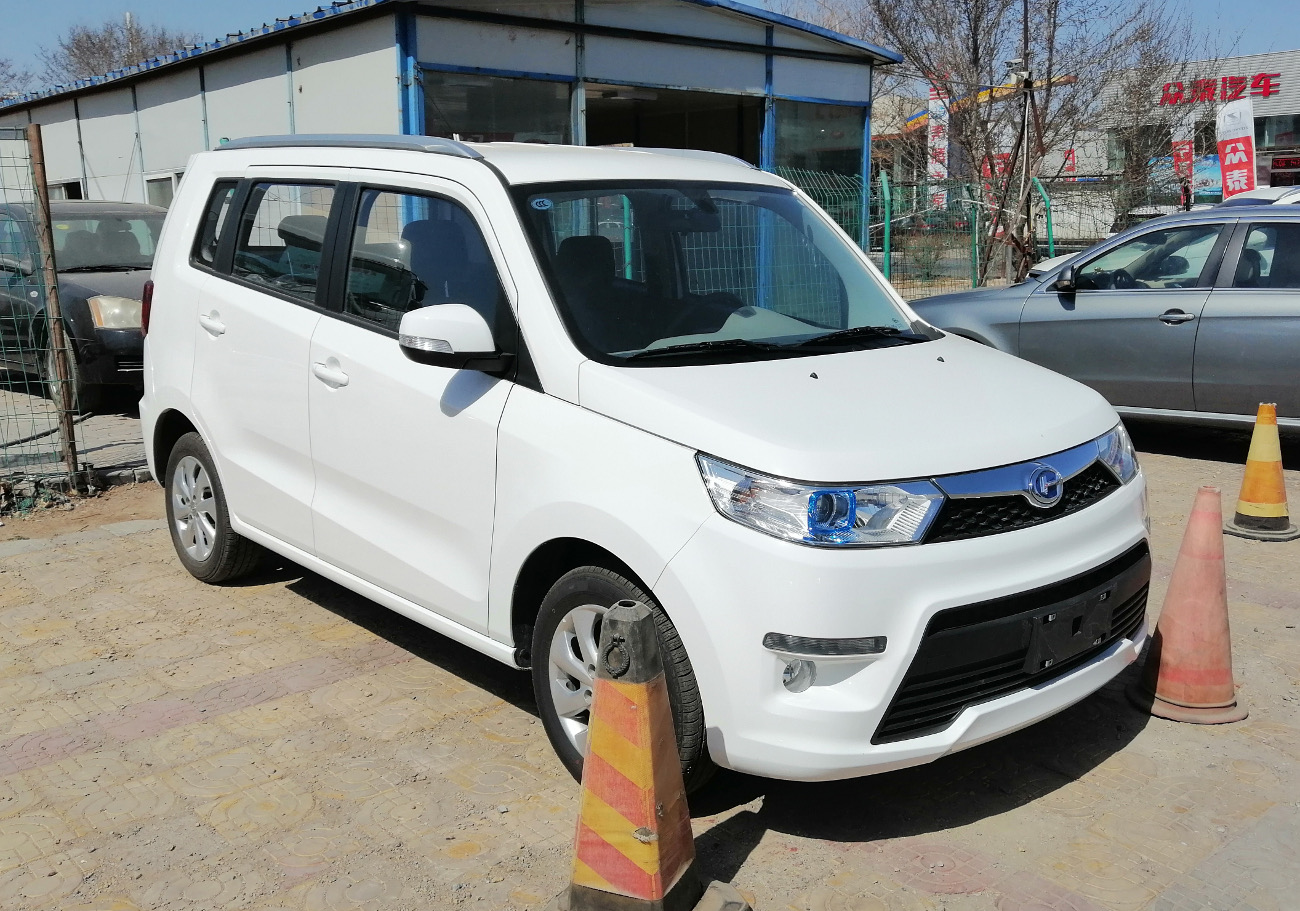
Changhe Beidouxing II

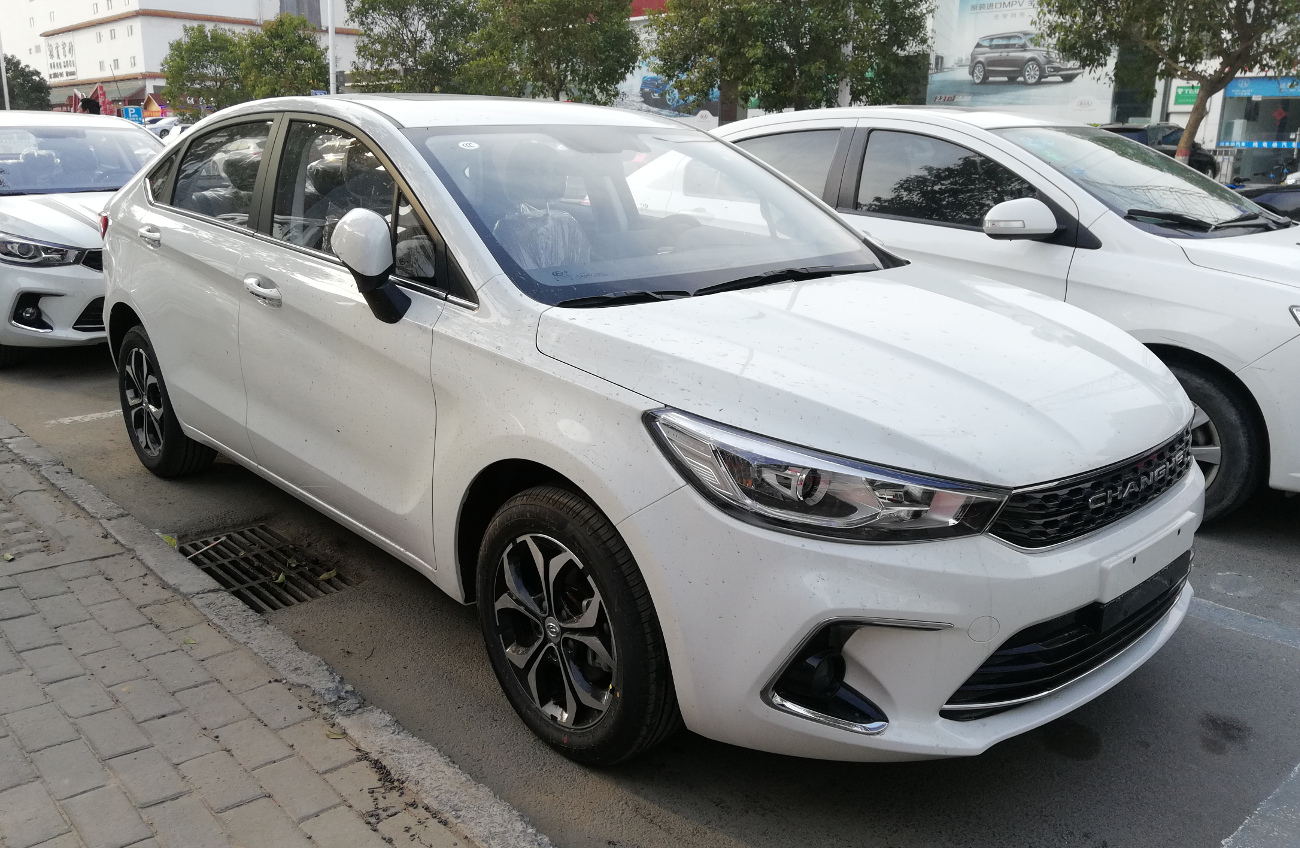
Changhe A6

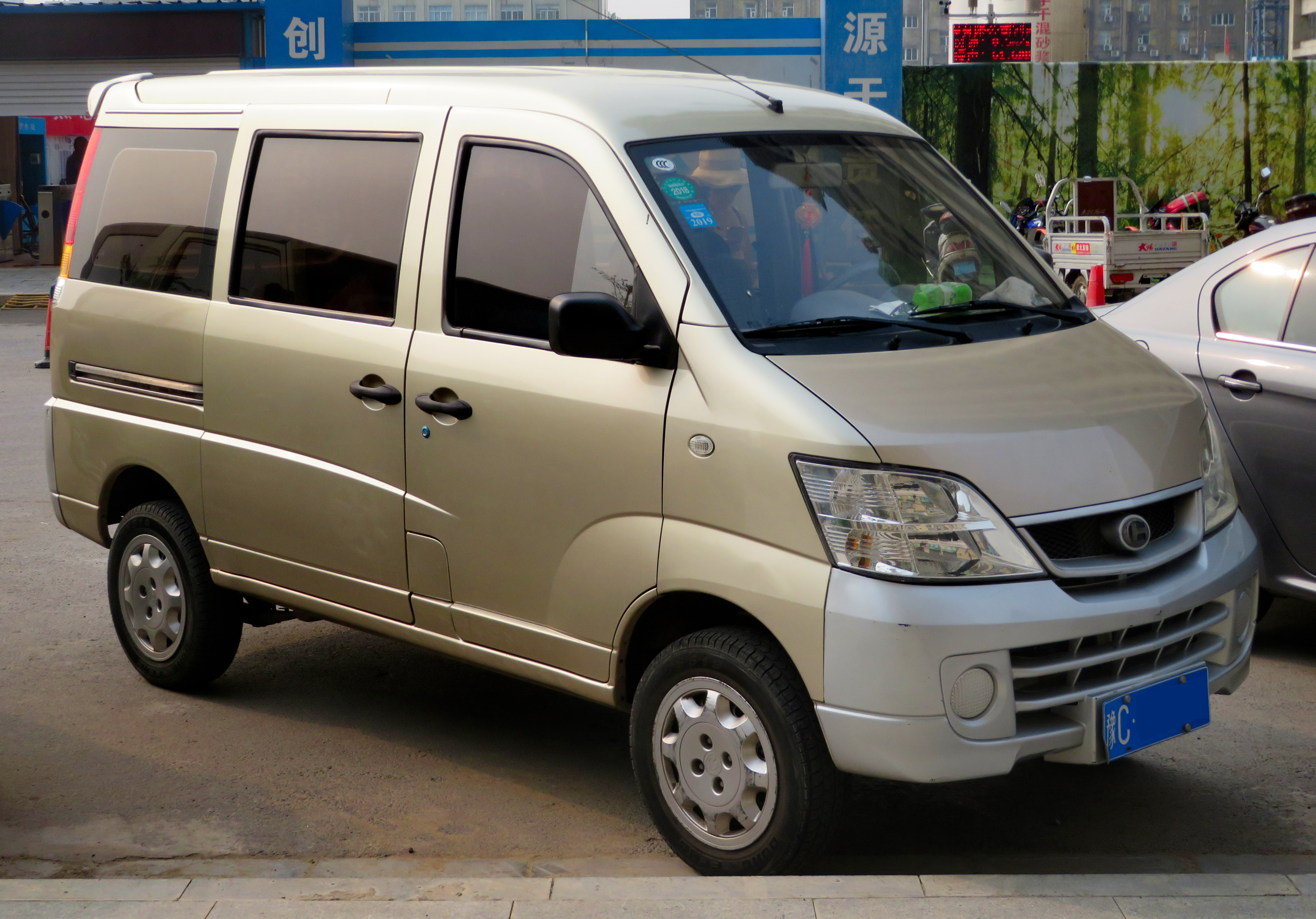
Changhe Freedom

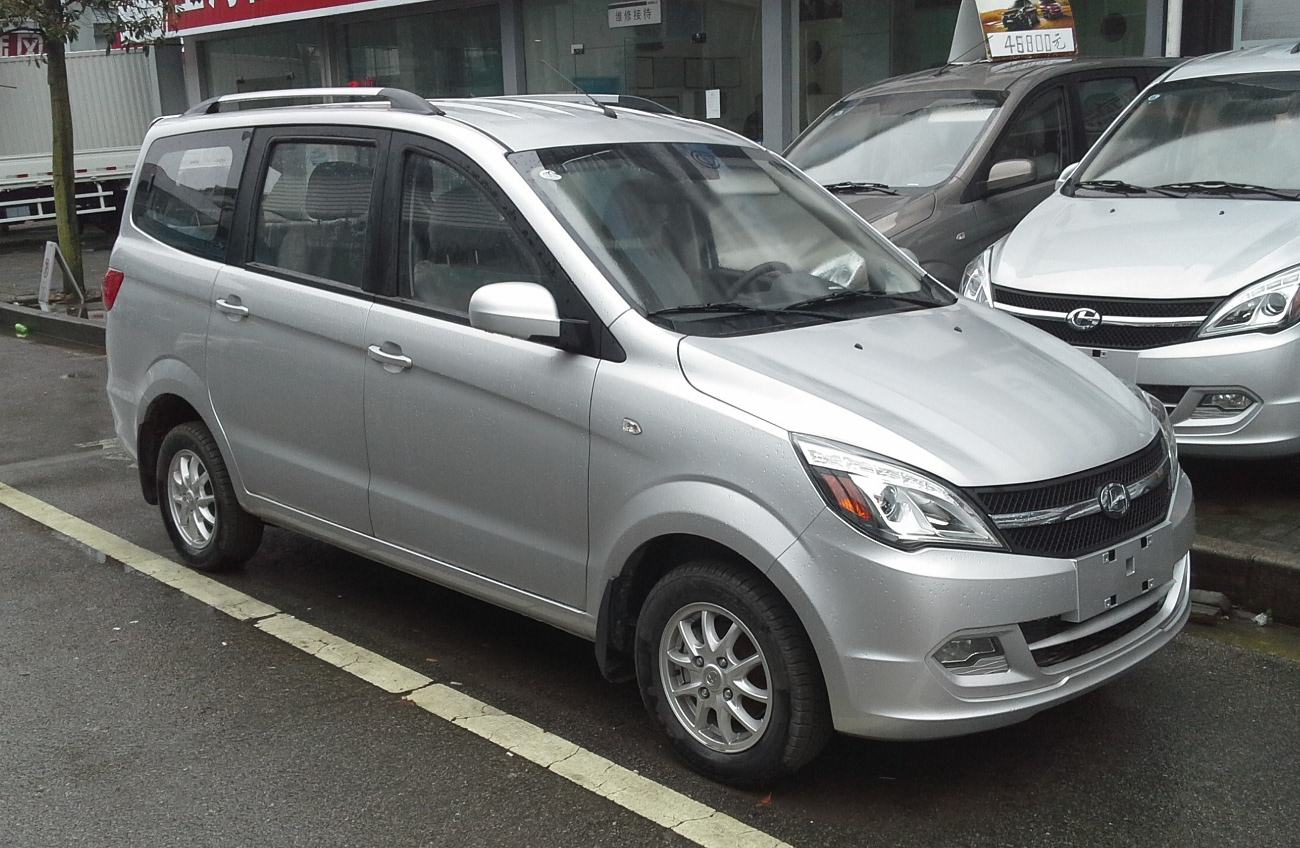
Changhe Freedom M50

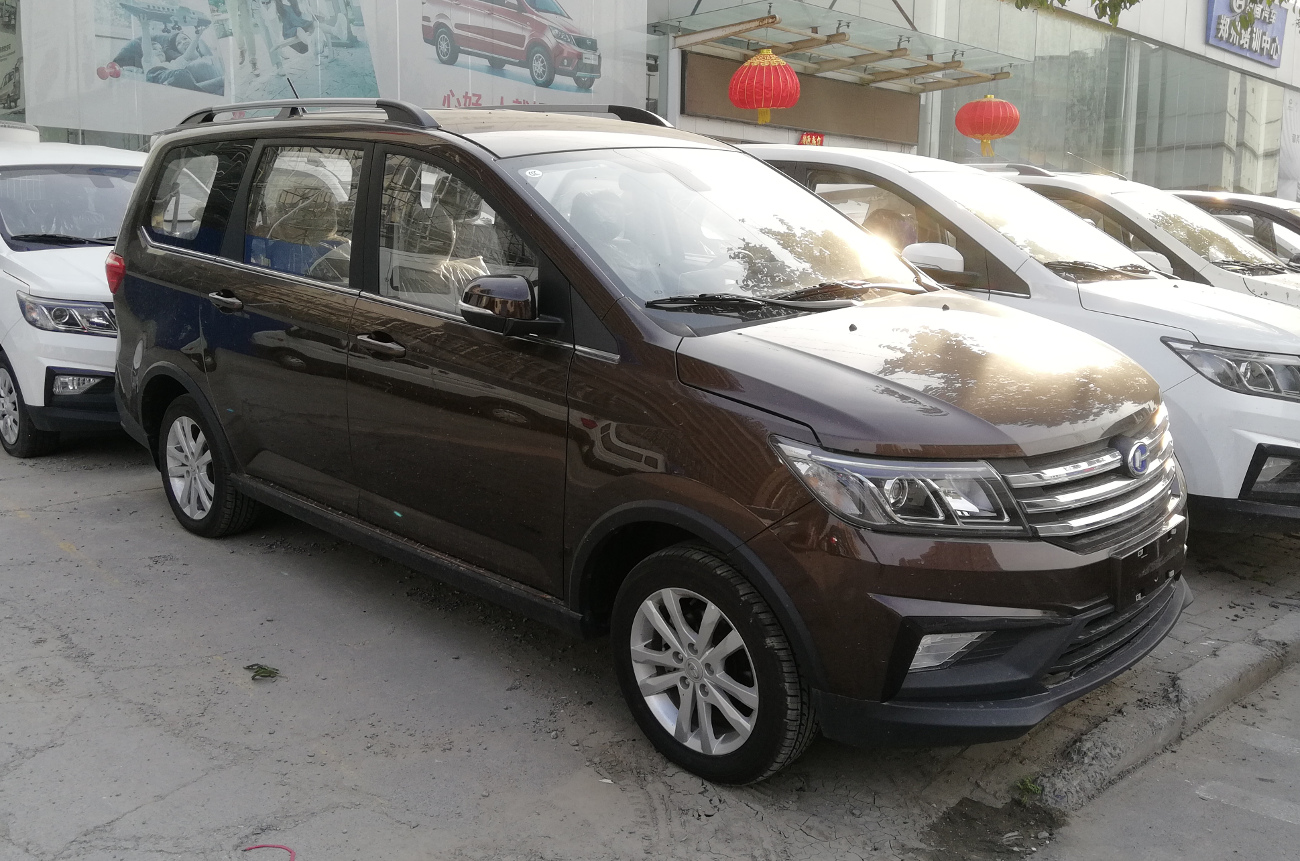
Changhe Freedom M70

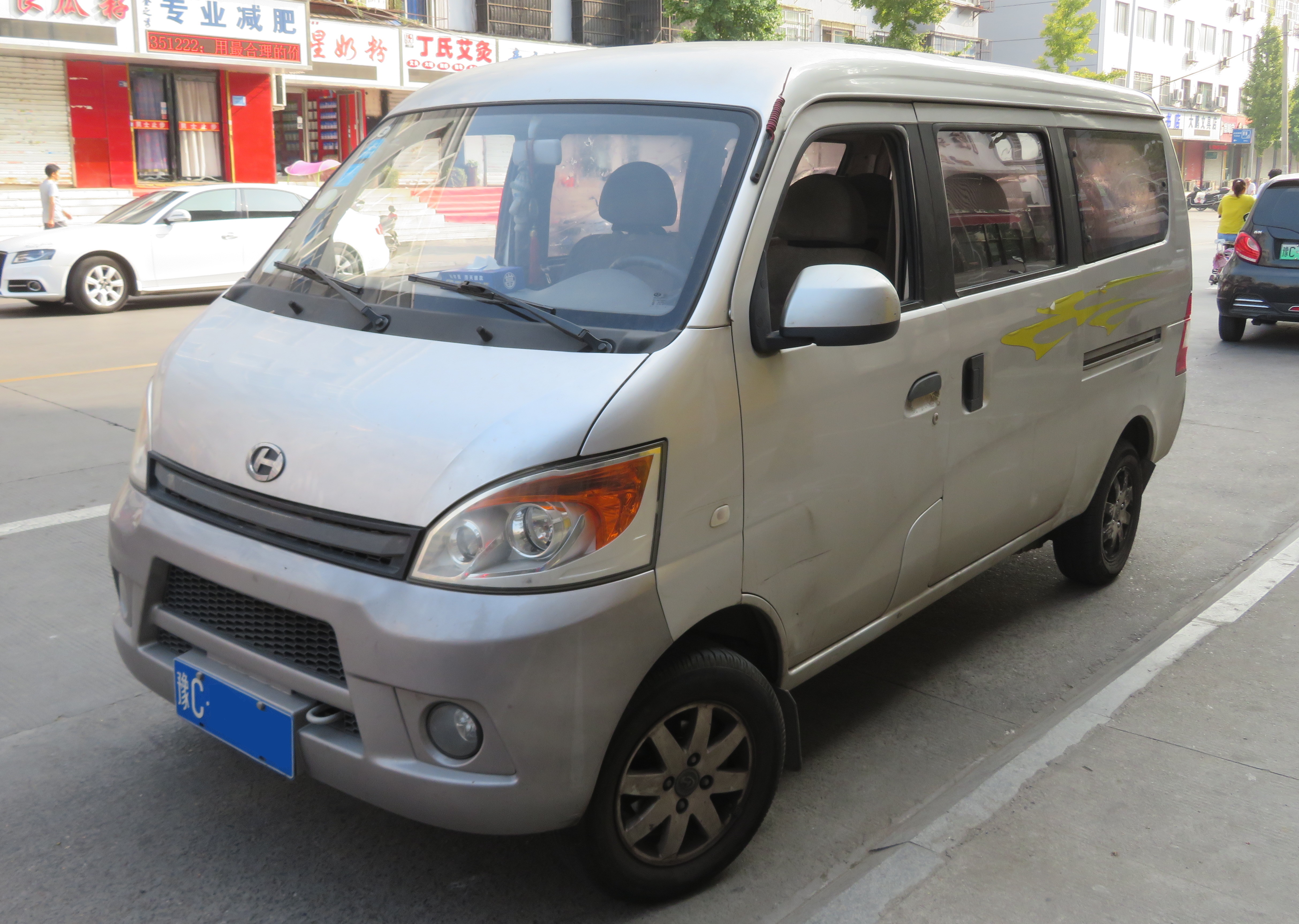
Changhe Fuyun

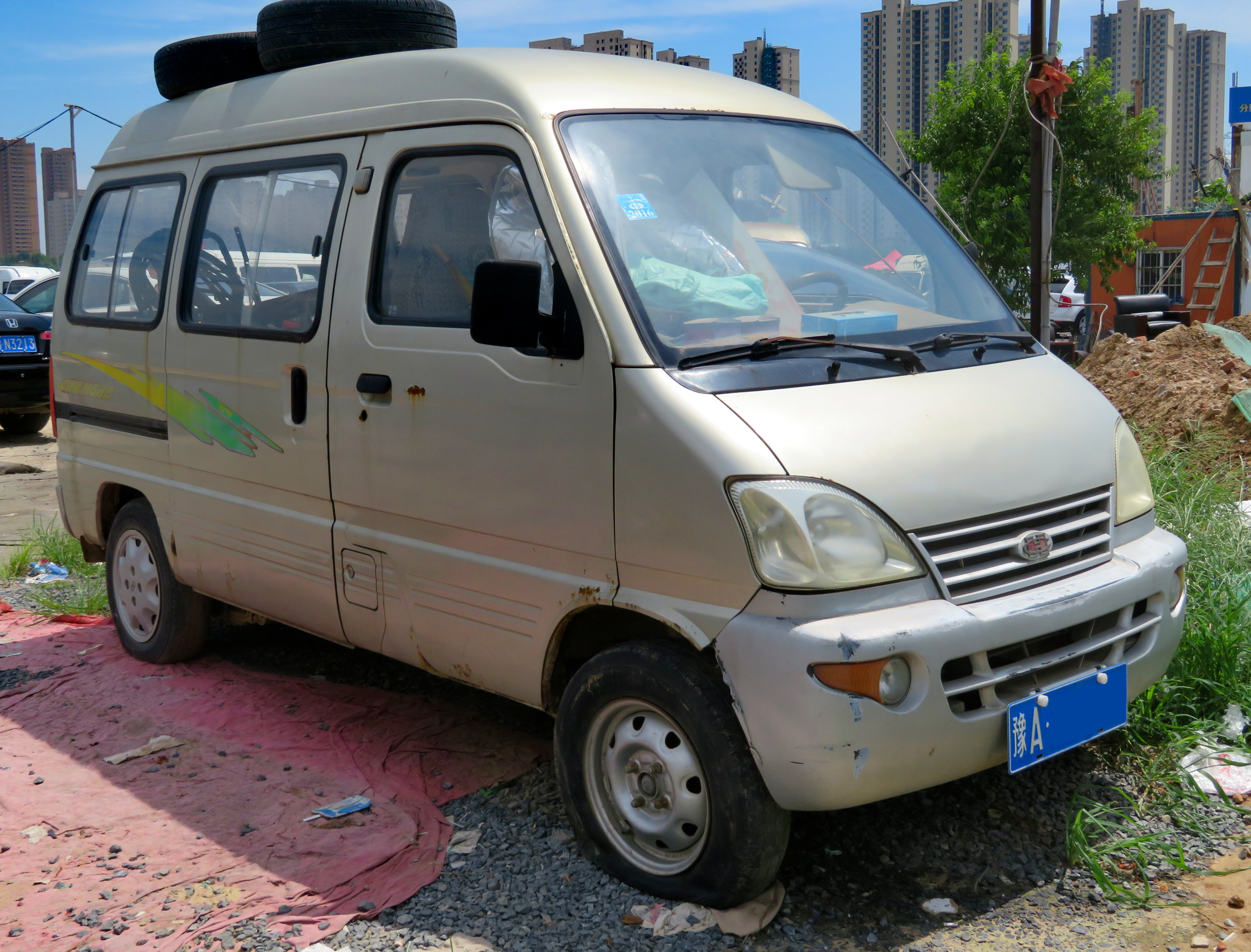
Changhe Haitun

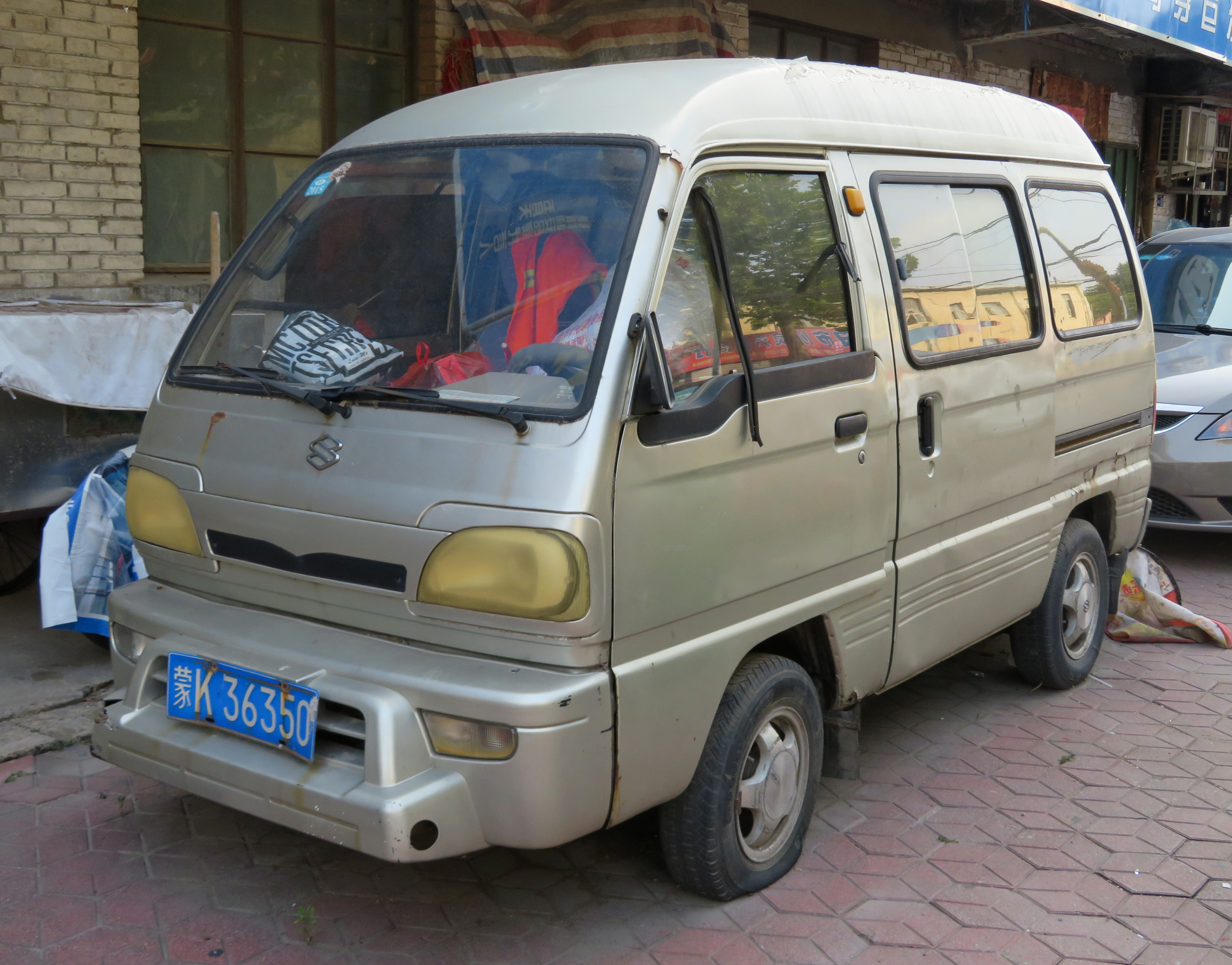
Changhe Changlingwang

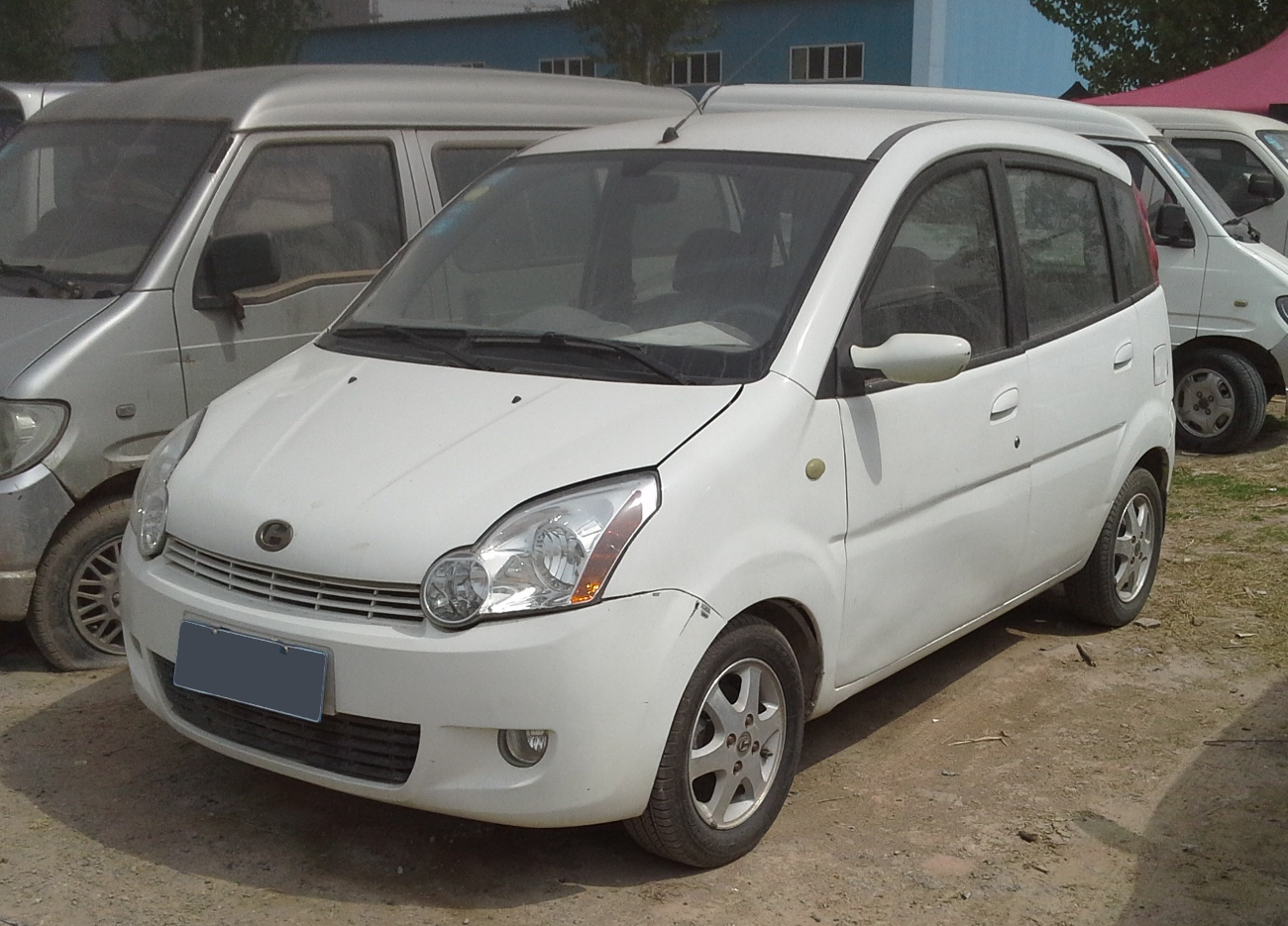
Changhe Ideal

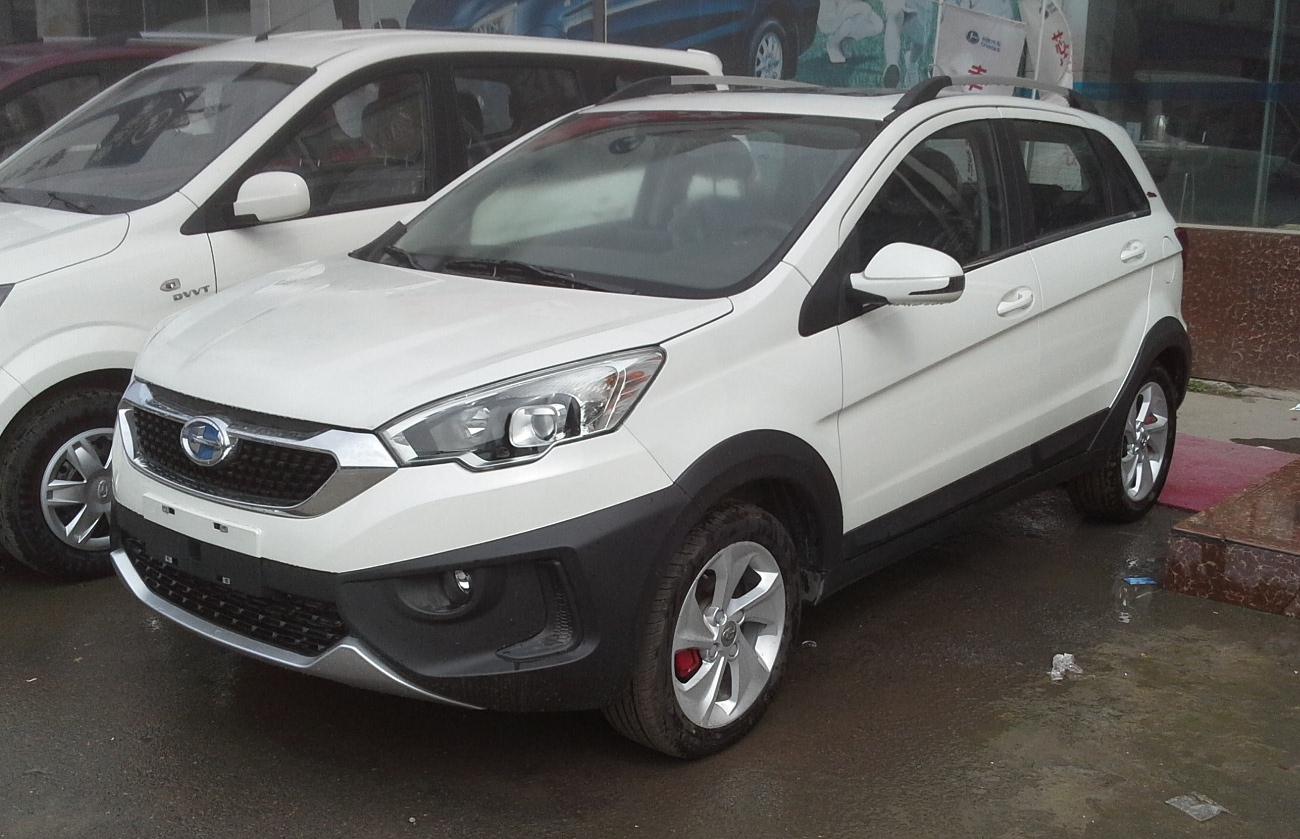
Changhe Q25

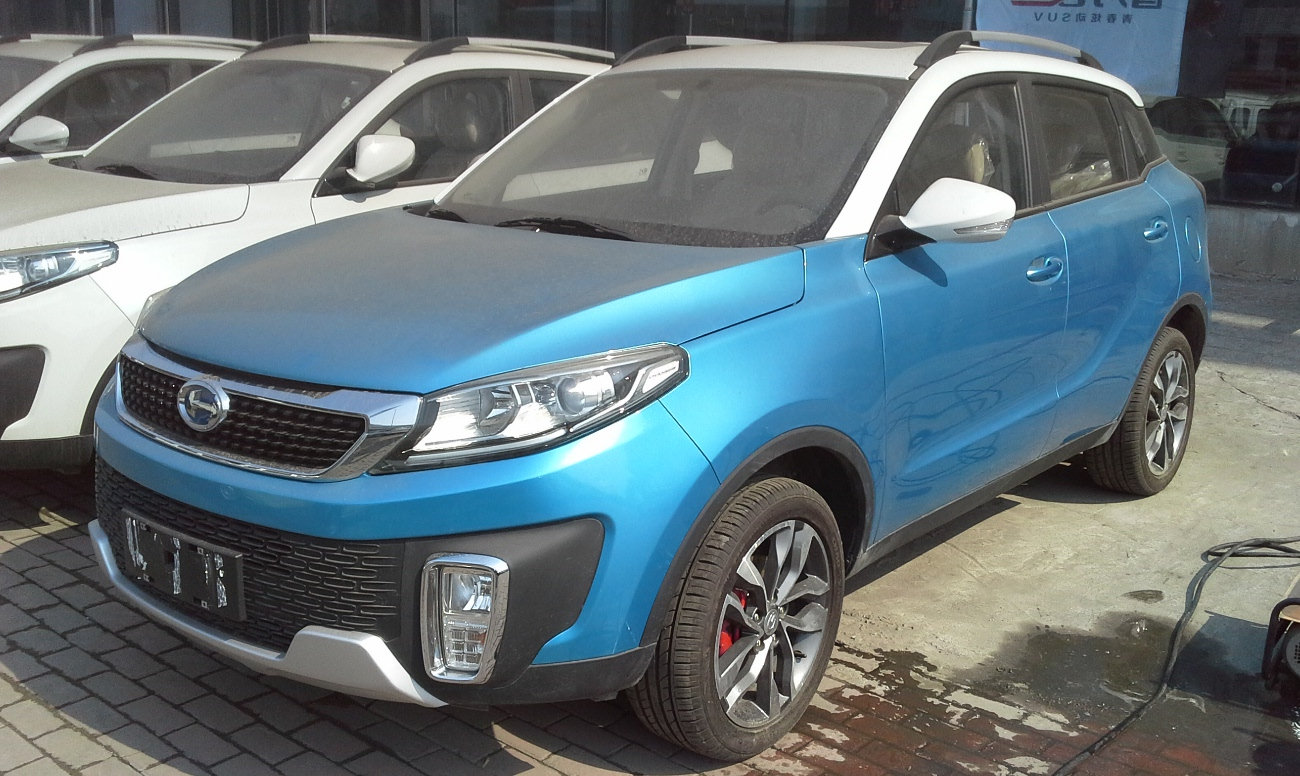
Changhe Q35

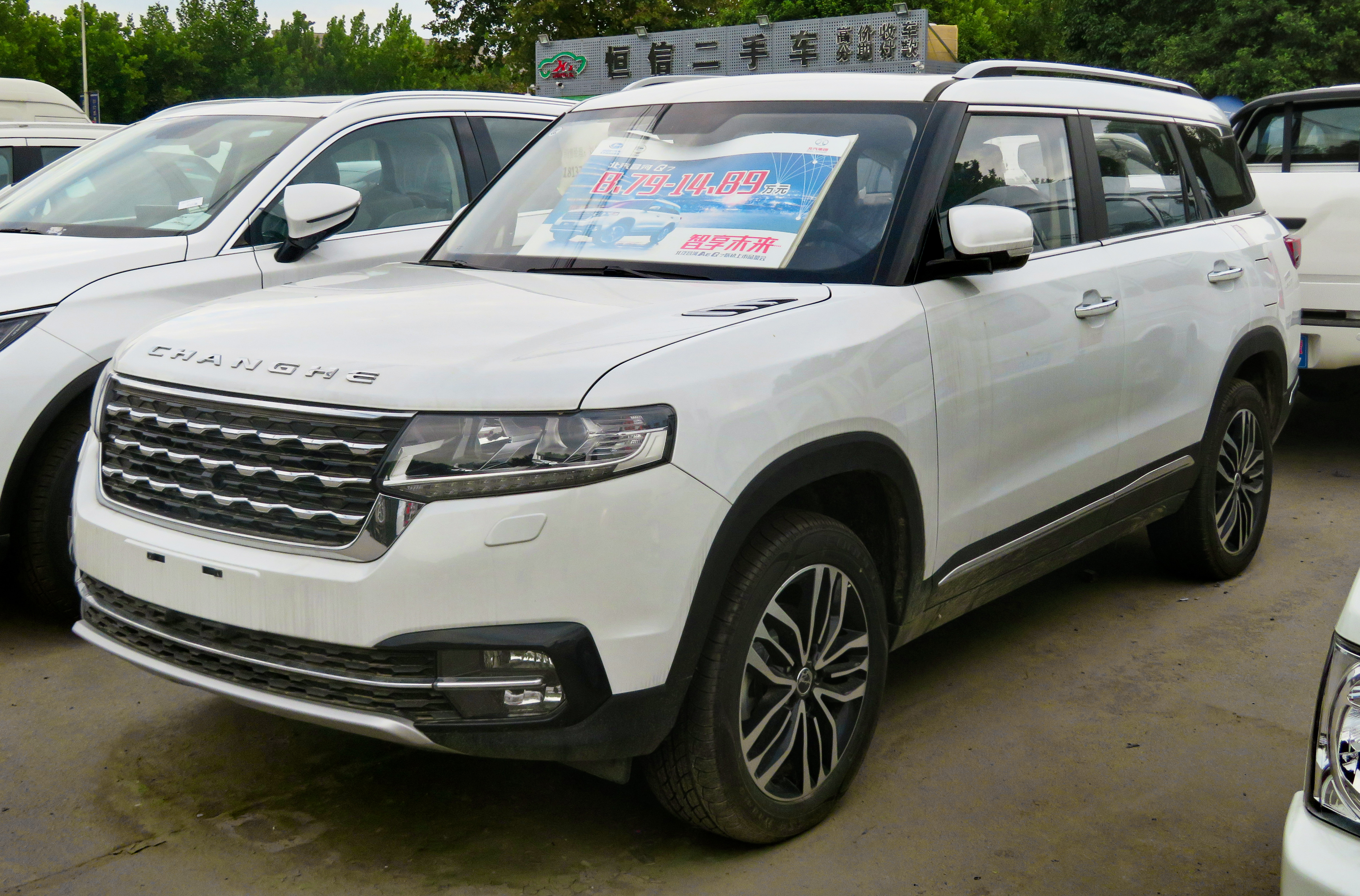
Changhe Q7

== Production bases ==
Changhe locates its production in Jiangxi Province, at Jingdezhen City and Jiujiang City, and in the capital of Anhui province, Hefei. Engines are made at the Jiujiang location, and all three production bases assemble cars.

== See also ==
- BAIC Group
