= Changhe Q35 =

Chinese compact CUV

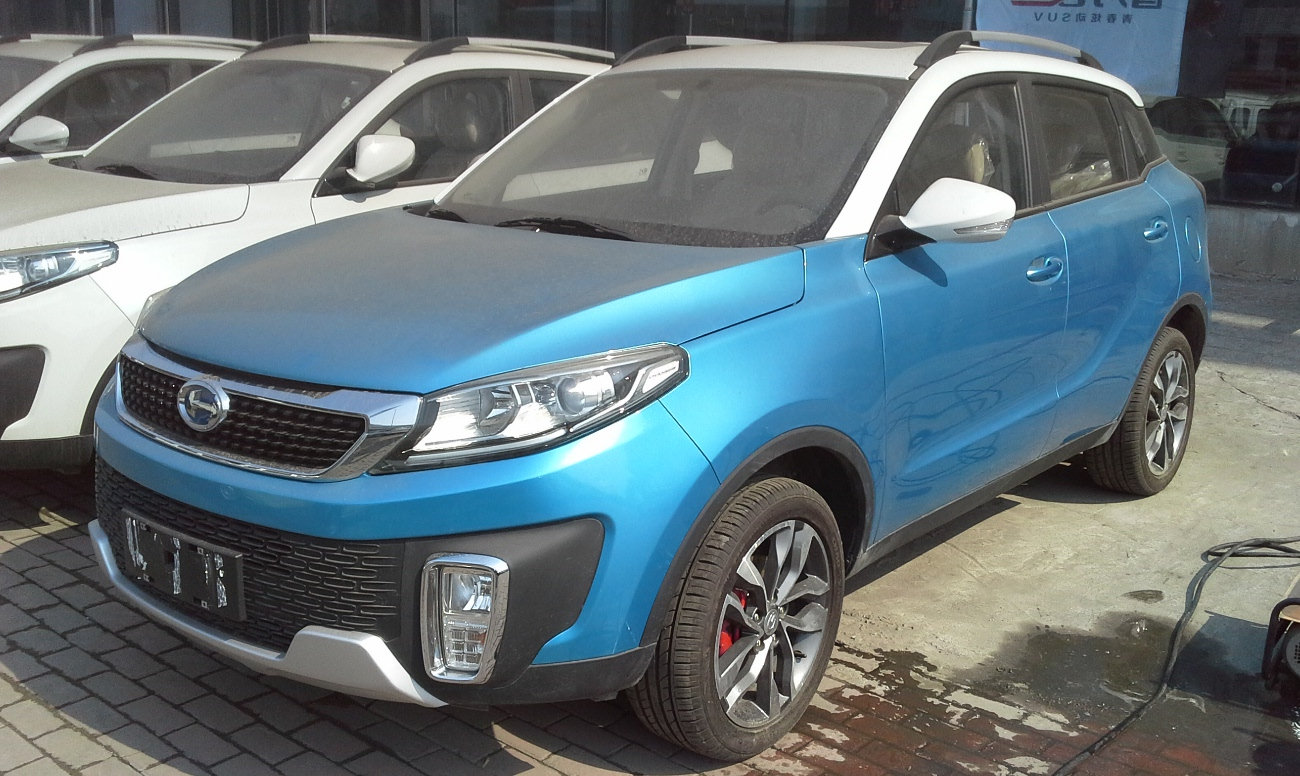

Overview
- Manufacturer: Changhe
- Production: 2015–2020
- Model years: 2016–2020

Body and chassis
- Class: Compact SUV
- Body style: 5-door hatchback
- Layout: FF
- Related: Senova X35

Powertrain
- Engine: 1.5L I4
- Transmission: 5-speed manual; 4-speed automatic

Dimensions
- Wheelbase: 2,519 mm (99.2 in)
- Length: 4,286 mm (168.7 in)
- Width: 1,815 mm (71.5 in)
- Height: 1,665 mm (65.6 in)
- Curb weight: 1,250–1,270 kg (2,756–2,800 lb)

The Changhe Q35 is a compact crossover produced by Changhe, unveiled during the 2016 Chengdu Auto Show in China.

== Overview ==
The Changhe Q35 is powered by a 1.5-liter inline-four engine producing 85 kW and 148 Nm. The pricing of the Changhe Q35 starts at 65,900 yuan and ends at 89,900 yuan.

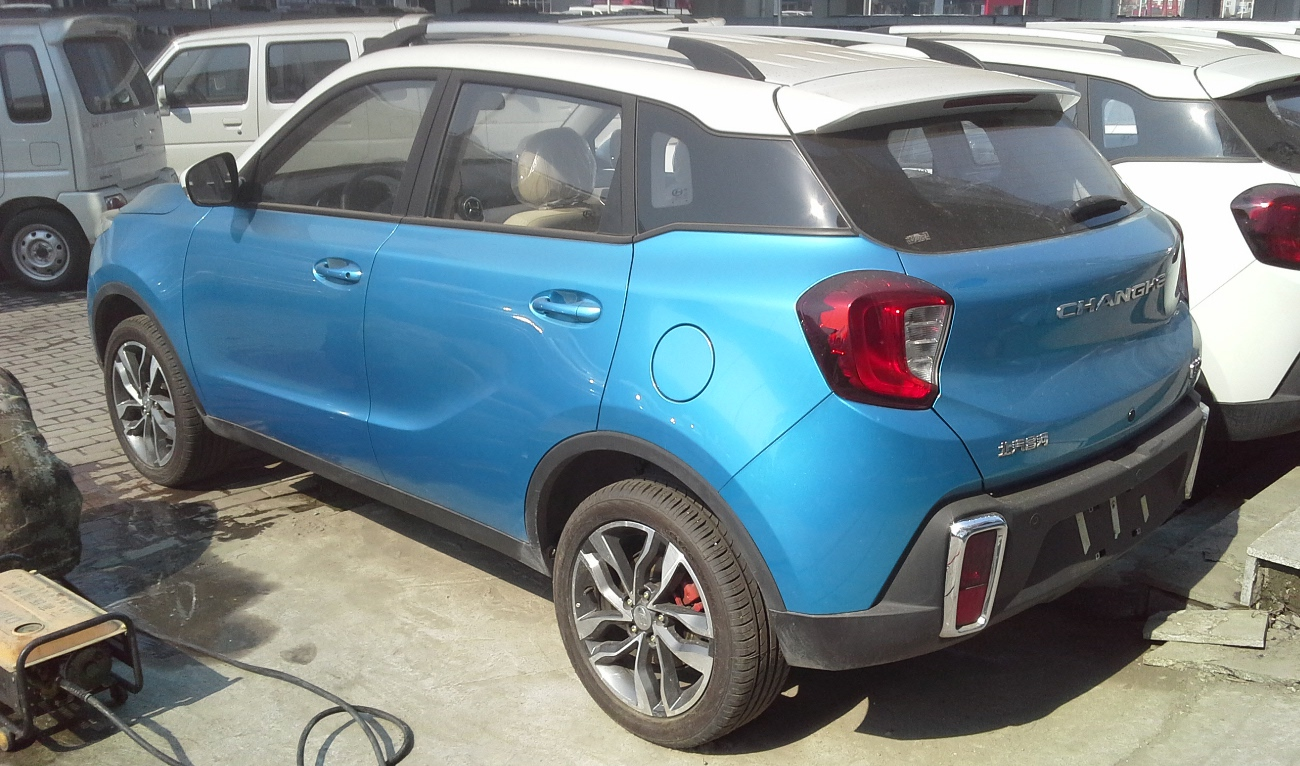
Changhe Q35 rear
