= BC-3 =

BC-3, BC.3, BC 3, BC3 or variant may refer to:

- Vultee BT-13 Valiant
- 3 BC, the year
- BC3, the IAU Minor Planet Center nomenclature for small solar system bodies
  - 1982 BC3, a.k.a. 2674 Pandarus
  - 1997 BC3, a.k.a. 22467 Koharumi
- BC3, boccia classification
- Butler County Community College (Pennsylvania)
- Brilliance BC3
- BC-3, 3-pin bayonet mount for light bulbs in the UK
- British Columbia Highway 3-the road in the Canadian National Highway System
