= Brilliance Tun =

Chinese city car

Brilliance Tun/Dolphin
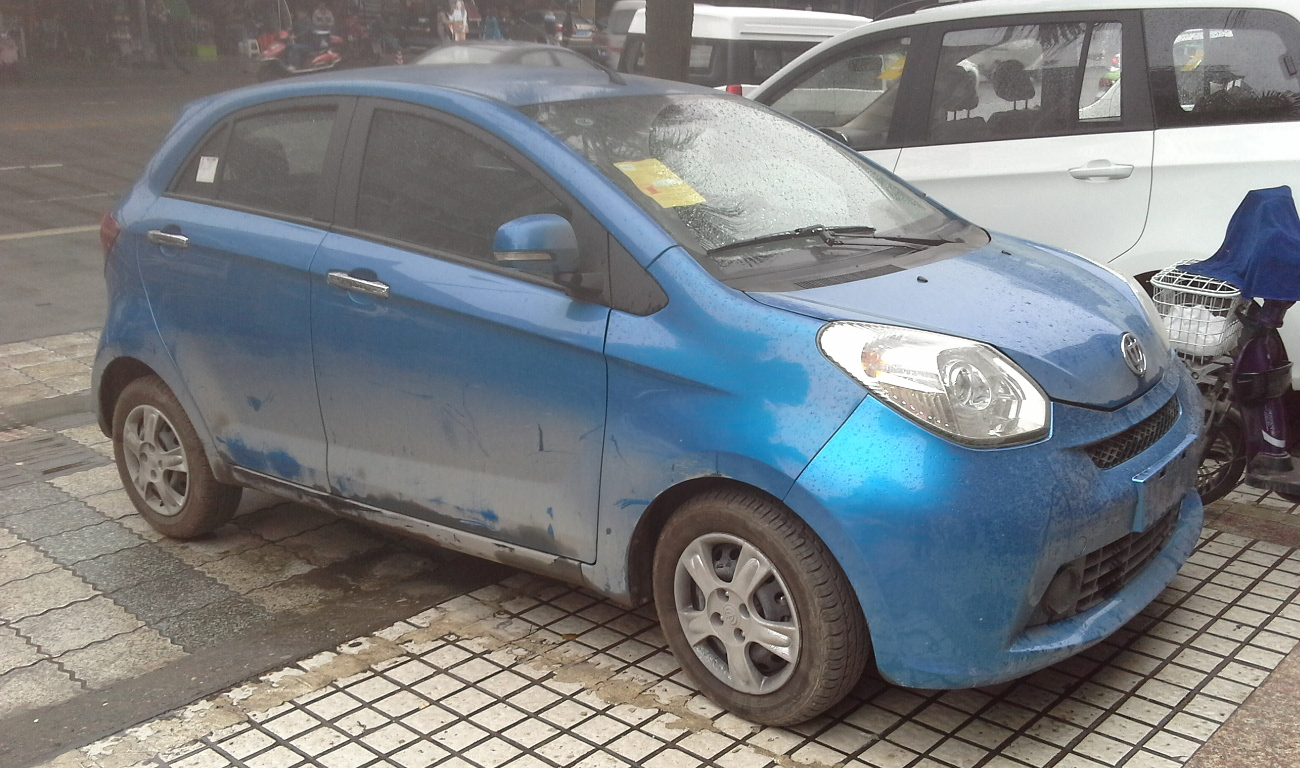
- Brilliance Tun/Dolphin front view

Overview
- Also called: Brilliance Dolphin; Brilliance H120 (name during development); Brilliance CaCa (pre-production name)
- Production: 2014–2015
- Model years: 2015

Body and chassis
- Class: City car (A)
- Body style: 5-door hatchback
- Layout: FF layout

Powertrain
- Engine: 1.3 L 4A13 I4
- Transmission: Manual

Dimensions
- Wheelbase: 2,400 mm (94.5 in)
- Length: 3,653 mm (143.8 in)
- Width: 1,663 mm (65.5 in)
- Height: 1,532 mm (60.3 in)
- Curb weight: Approximately 1,000 kg (2,204.6 lb)

The Brilliance Tun (Chinese: 中华豚; pinyin: Zhongua Tun), is a 5-door city car produced by Chinese automobile manufacturer Brilliance Auto, sold briefly from 2014 to 2015 for the 2015 model year. Tun is derived from haitun (海豚), the Chinese word for dolphin. A dolphin badge is featured on the rear hatch and the car is alternatively referred to as the Brilliance Dolphin.

== Overview ==
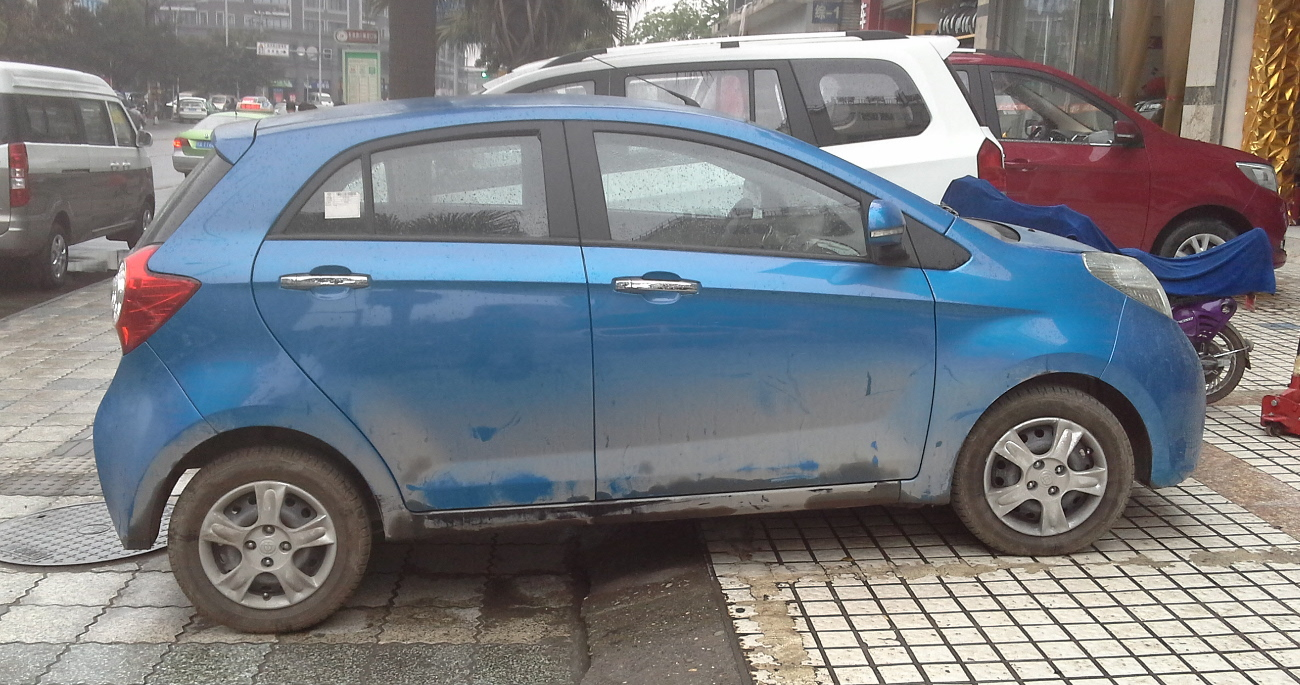
Brilliance Tun/Dolphin side view

Development of the Brilliance Tun began in mid-2012 as the H120, then in November 2013 at Auto Guangzhou it was revealed as the CaCa. The car went on sale nearly a year later in September 2014 as the Tun, and was generally cheap, sold at a starting price of CN¥29.800 (US$4,616) maxing at CN¥45.800 (US$7,095). The Tun was intended to compete with other well-selling Chinese city cars, such as the Chery QQ3, Changan BenBen, and JAC Yueyue and foreign models like the Toyota Yaris, however sales were poor and it was discontinued a year after launch.

== Specifications ==
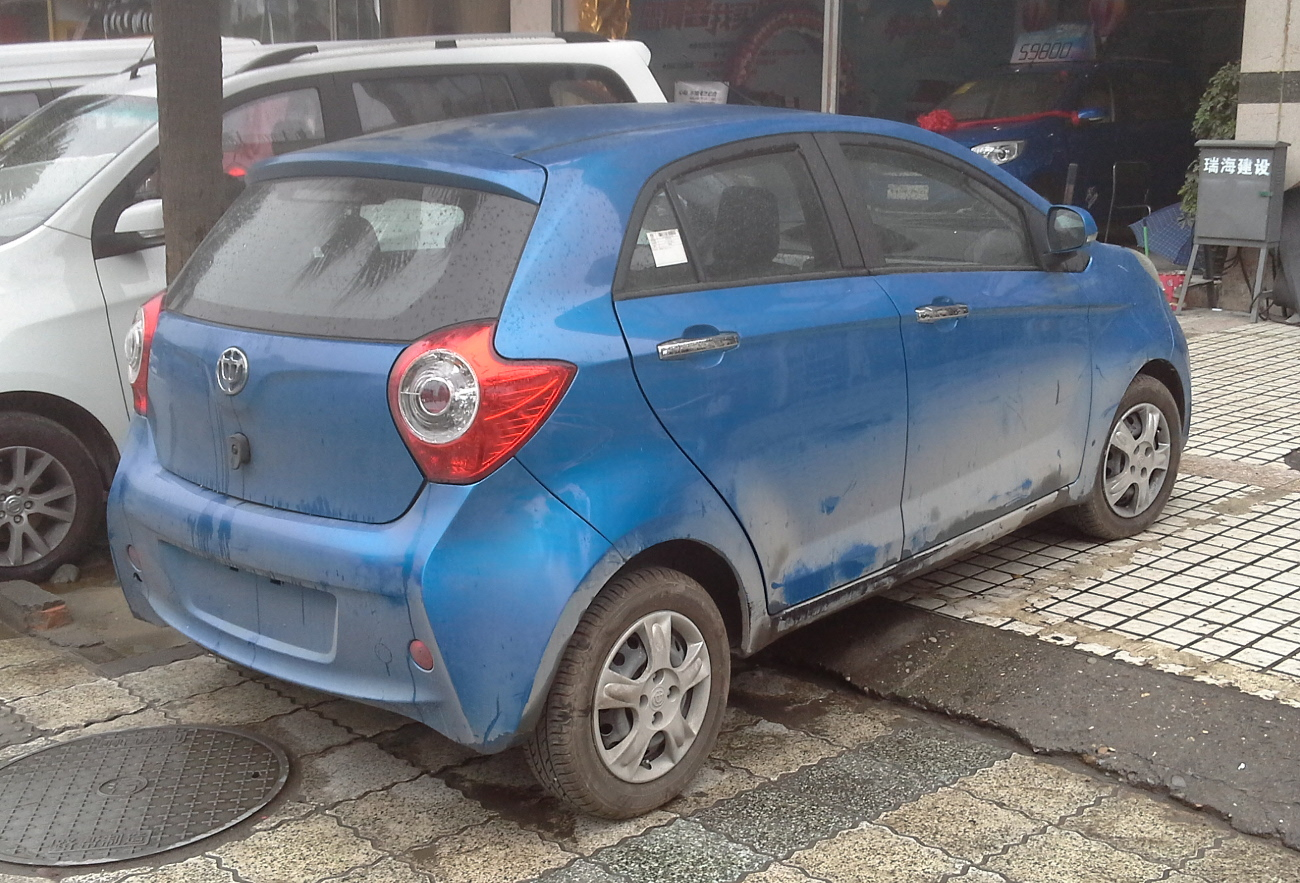
Brilliance Tun/Dolphin rear view

The Brilliance Tun was available in three variant and had only one engine option, a Brilliance 4A13 1.3L engine with 65kW of maximum engine power, 88PS of maximum horsepower, and 120Nm of maximum torque. The only transmission available was a 5-speed manual.
