= Brilliance Auto Group =

Chinese state-owned automotive manufacturing company

Huachen Automotive Group Holdings Co. Ltd.
- Trade name: Brilliance Auto Group
- Type: State-owned enterprise
- Industry: Automotive
- Founded: 1992; 34 years ago (Brilliance Auto); 2002 (current incorporation of Huachen Automotive Group)
- Founder: Chinese government; Yang Rong
- Headquarters: Shenyang, Liaoning Province, China
- Area served: Exported worldwide
Key people
Yan Bingzhe	(Chairman and Party Committee Secretary of the Group;
	Zhang Yue (Chairman and CEO of Brilliance Auto Holdings)
- Products: Automobiles; Automotive components
- Brands: Brilliance; Huasong; Jinbei; Zhonghua
- Revenue: ▲CNY181130 million (2019)
- Net income: ▼CNY279 million (2019)
- Total assets: ▲CNY195348 million (2019)
- Total equity: CNY4992 million (2019)
Owner
Liaoning Provincial Government	(80%)
Liaoning Social Security Fund	(20%)
- Number of employees: ▼5,610 (Brilliance Auto only) (2019)
- Parent: Liaoning Provincial Government's SASAC
- Subsidiaries: Brilliance Auto (SEHK: 1114; 42.32%)

Chinese name
- Simplified Chinese: 华晨汽车集团控股有限公司
- Traditional Chinese: 華晨汽車集團控股有限公司
- Hanyu Pinyin: Huáchén qìchē jítuán kònggǔ yǒuxiàn gōngsī
- Literal meaning: "China morning" automotive group holdings limited company
Transcriptions
Standard Mandarin
- Hanyu Pinyin: Huáchén qìchē jítuán kònggǔ yǒuxiàn gōngsī

Brilliance Auto Group
- Simplified Chinese: 华晨汽车集团
- Traditional Chinese: 華晨汽車集團
- Hanyu Pinyin: Huáchén qìchē jítuán
Transcriptions
Standard Mandarin
- Hanyu Pinyin: Huáchén qìchē jítuán

Brilliance Auto
- Simplified Chinese: 华晨汽车
- Traditional Chinese: 華晨汽車
- Hanyu Pinyin: Huáchén qìchē
Transcriptions
Standard Mandarin
- Hanyu Pinyin: Huáchén qìchē
Yue: Cantonese
- Yale Romanization: wàh sàhn hei chē
- Jyutping: waa4 san4 hei3 ce1
- Website: www.brilliance-auto.com
- Footnotes financial figures are from consolidated financial statements; profit and equity have excluded minority interest.

Huachen Automotive Group Holdings Co. Ltd., known by its brand name Brilliance Auto Group, is a Chinese multinational automobile manufacturer holding company headquartered in Shenyang. Its products include automobiles, microvans, and automotive components. Its principal activity is the design, development, manufacture, and sale of passenger cars sold under the Brilliance brand. It was established by founding chairman Yang Rong.

Brilliance Auto Group holds a 42.32% shareholding in the Bermuda-incorporated Brilliance China Automotive Holdings Limited (commonly known as Brilliance Auto or Brilliance China), which is listed on the Frankfurt and Hong Kong stock exchanges.

Brilliance China Automotive Holdings (Brilliance Auto) previously produced "Brilliance" branded cars under manufacturing unit Brilliance Motor, which has since been sold to BMW. Brilliance Auto also holds 25% of BMW Brilliance, a joint venture with BMW which produces, distributes, and sells BMW passenger cars in mainland China. It also holds a 51% stake of Renault Brilliance Jinbei, a joint venture with Renault which designs, develops, manufactures, and sells light commercial vehicles under the Jinbei, Huasong and Renault brands. As of 2022, BMW held 100% of the shares in Brilliance Motor, and 75% of BMW-Brilliance, controlling the majority of production capacity under Brilliance.

In 2010, Brilliance Auto Group and its subsidiaries had an annual production capacity of 800,000 vehicles although capacity has come online since. In 2012, the company manufactured almost 650,000 vehicles, the eighth-largest production of any Chinese vehicle maker that year. Roughly 70% of production was consumer sedans.

== History ==
=== Origins ===
The origins of Brilliance Auto Group (officially Huachen Automotive Group Holdings Company Limited) can be traced to a Chinese-government-owned automobile factory, which under founding chairman Yang Rong became one of the leading Chinese makers of minibuses between 1991 and 2002.

=== 1990s ===
In the 1990s under Yang Rong, Brilliance rose to become China’s largest automaker.

On 9 June 1992, a subsidiary, Brilliance China Automotive Holding Limited was incorporated in Bermuda. In the same year, the company was registered as a foreign company in the Hong Kong Companies Registry. Initially, the subsidiary owned 40% stake of Shenyang Jinbei Coach Manufacturing Co. Ltd. (Chinese: 沈阳金杯客车制造有限公司), while the rest of the stake was owned by another company, Shenyang Jinbei Automotive Company Limited (Chinese: 金杯汽车股份有限公司; SSE: 600609). The ratio was later changed to 51% owned by Brilliance China Auto and 49% owned by Shenyang Jinbei Automotive. The American depositary shares of Brilliance China Auto were floated on the New York Stock Exchange beginning in 1992 as NYSE:CBA. The company intended to delist from NYSE in 2007 and completed in 2009.

In 1999, the Group injected most of the group assets into the subsidiary, and the shares began to be traded on the Stock Exchange of Hong Kong (now part of Hong Kong Exchanges and Clearing) as SEHK:1114. As of 31 December 2019, Huachen Automotive Group (Brilliance Auto Group) owned 42.32% shares of the listed company as the largest and controlling shareholder.

The Group has another listed associate company that is listing in the Shanghai Stock Exchange: Shenyang Jinbei Automotive Company Limited. As of 31 December 2019, the Brilliance Auto Group, via an intermediate company Shenyang Automobile Industry Asset Management Company Limited (Chinese: 沈阳市汽车工业资产经营有限公司), owned 24.38% of the shares of that company as the largest and controlling shareholder. It planned to inject the stake into the major listed company of the group, Brilliance Auto, in 2003. However, the deal collapsed. Nevertheless, Shenyang Jinbei Automotive has not had the controlling interest of Shenyang Jinbei Coach Manufacturing since 1992, which is the predecessor of Brilliance Jinbei (now Renault Brilliance Jinbei).

Shenyang Jinbei Automotive has been listed on the stock exchange since 1992. Shenyang Jinbei Automotive and Brilliance Auto Group were separate conglomerates, and a controlling stake in Shenyang Jinbei Automotive was acquired by FAW Group in 1995. Shenyang Automobile Industry AMC agreed to acquire a 29.91% stake from FAW Group in 2000.

=== 2000s ===
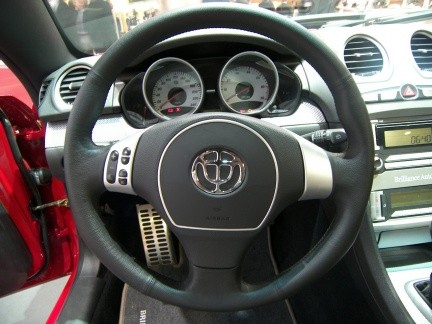
Brilliance steering wheel in the Brilliance BC3

In 2001, Shenhua Holdings agreed to acquire the shares of Shenyang Jinbei Automotive that were held by Shenyang Automobile Industry AMC, allowing the Jinbei marque integrated into the Group. However, the deal revised into Brilliance Auto agreed to acquire the stake from Shenyang Automobile Industry AMC in 2003. Despite the final deal became Brilliance Auto Group acquired Shenyang Automobile Industry AMC directly in April 2018 from the Shenyang Municipal People's Government, which in turn has the full control of the stake of Shenyang Jinbei Automotive that was held by the AMC.

In 2001, Forbes reported that Chairman Yang Rong was China's third-richest businessman. Yang made a failed bid to locate a Brilliance factory in Ningbo, China. Ningbo is near the rich coastal city of Shanghai. In his attempt, Yang incurred the wrath of the governor of the province of Liaoning, Bo Xilai (Bo was later convicted on bribery, corruption, abuse of power, and embezzlement, and sentenced to life imprisonment), as Bo demanded that Yang locate the factory in Liaoning and Yang refused. In 2002, Bo seized Yang's stake of $700 million in Brilliance. Bo also accused Yang of embezzlement, and had an arrest warrant issued against him, precipitating Yang's flight from China in July 2002; since then Yang has been living in exile in the United States.

In 2003, BMW and Brilliance Auto signed a deal for the production of BMW-branded sedans in China.

In 2005, Brilliance planned an entry into the newly formed FIA World Touring Car Championship. However, the Brilliance WTCC program did not make the grid.

From 2009 to 2011, the group was the eighth-largest automaker in China.

=== 2010s to present ===
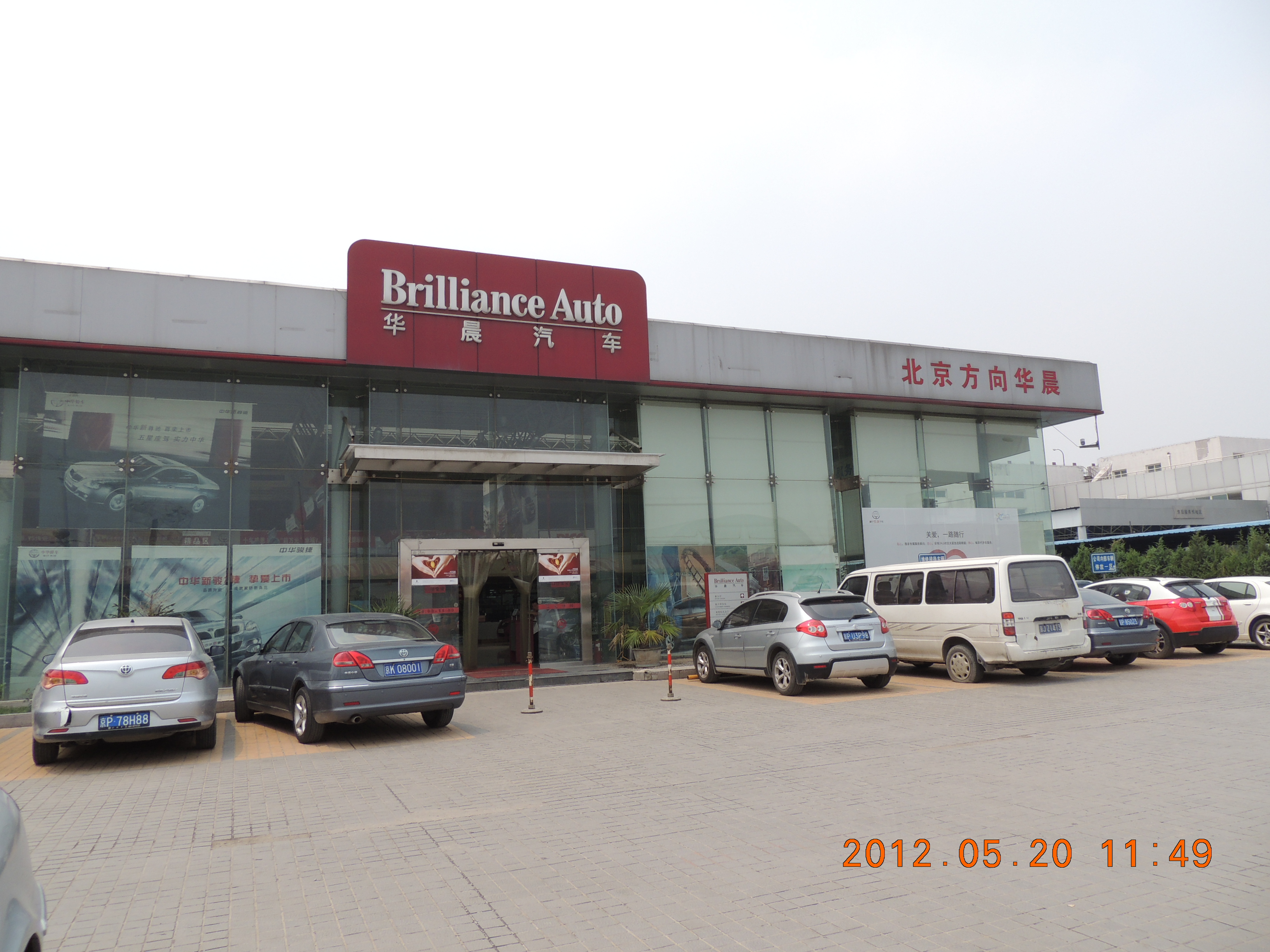
Brilliance Auto dealership in Beijing, China

In 2012, Brilliance Auto Group formed a joint venture Brilliance Shineray (Chinese: 华晨鑫源) in Chongqing with Shineray Group to produce SWM and Jinbei brand automobiles. As of 2019, Shineray Group owned 80% stake of that joint venture. The rest is owned by 沈阳华益新汽车销售有限公司. The latter is not part of the Brilliance Auto Group, but the Group provides a guarantee for some debt of that company.

In 2013, Brilliance Auto formed a spin-off, Xinchen China Power Holdings Limited.

In 2017, Brilliance Auto also formed another joint venture Renault Brilliance Jinbei with Renault. Brilliance Auto acquired the remaining 39.1% stake of Brilliance Jinbei from sister company Shenyang Jinbei Automotive, and then Brilliance Auto re-sold a 49% stake to Renault.

In October 2018, BMW Brilliance, a 50:50 joint venture between BMW and Brilliance, was taken over by BMW by the latter acquiring an additional 25% of the available shares.

In recent years, Brilliance Group has suffered from long-term poor management, and its own brands have been in a state of loss. The majority of profits come from BMW Brilliance and the debt ratio remains high. In 2019, Brilliance Auto's net profit was RMB 7.626 billion. If the profits of BMW Brilliance were subtracted, the figure would be a loss of RMB 1.334 billion. In the first half of 2020, Brilliance Auto's net profit was RMB 4.045 billion, of which BMW Brilliance contributed RMB 4.338 billion. Two credit rating agencies in mainland China, Dagong International and Oriental Jincheng, began to put Brilliance bonds on their watch list in late August 2020. By late September, Brilliance's credit rating began to be downgraded. By late October, Brilliance's credit rating had been reduced from AAA to A+.

In November 2020, Brilliance Auto's parent went into bankruptcy administration and announced the default of corporate bonds worth more than CNY6.5 billion. The bankruptcy administration does not affect the subsidiaries Brilliance Auto, Xinchen China Power, Shenhua Holdings, Shenyang Jinbei Automotive, or any of the joint ventures operated by the organization.

On January 12, 2021, the Shanghai Stock Exchange issued a disciplinary decision to publicly condemn Brilliance Automotive Group Holding Co., Ltd., its chairman, and the official in charge of information disclosure affairs.

On December 30, 2021, Brilliance Renault Jinbei Automobile Co., Ltd. filed a new bankruptcy review case, and the handling court was the Shenyang Intermediate People's Court of Liaoning Province.

In June 2023, Brilliance Group stated that it had identified Shenyang Automobile Co., Ltd. as a potential investor in the reorganization. Shenyang Automobile is a wholly owned subsidiary of Shenyang Cairui Investment Co., Ltd. Caisheng Investment, a subsidiary of Shenyang Cairui Shengjing Financial Holdings, and Shenyang Metro Operation, a subsidiary of Shenyang Metro, each hold 50% of the shares. The actual controller is Shenyang State-owned Assets Supervision and Administration Commission. After the relevant procedures for reorganization are passed, the actual controller of Brilliance Auto will be changed from the Liaoning Provincial State-owned Assets Supervision and Administration Commission to the Shenyang Municipal State-owned Assets Supervision and Administration Commission.

On September 15, 2023, FAW Car Vice President Liu Xuemin and former Vice President Liu Tongfu were suspected of serious violations of discipline and law, and were both subject to disciplinary review and supervision investigation by the Liaoning Provincial Commission for Discipline Inspection and Supervision.

== Corporate leadership ==
=== Chairmens ===
- Yang Rong (1992–2002)
- Wu Xiao-an (2002–2023)
- Zhang Yue (2024–present)

=== CEOs ===
- Qi Yumin (2006–2019)
- Yan Bingzhe (2019–2024)
- Zhang Yue (2024–present)

== Products ==
Brilliance Auto logo until 2002

Brilliance Auto Group and its subsidiaries sell passenger cars under the Brilliance marque.

=== Brilliance products (produced under Brilliance Motor) ===
==== Earlier discontinued models ====
- Brilliance BS2
  - Brilliance FRV
  - Brilliance FRV Cross
  - Brilliance FSV
- Brilliance BS4
- Brilliance BS6
- Brilliance BC3
- Brilliance H220 / H230
- Brilliance H320 / H330
- Brilliance H530
- Brilliance H3
- Brilliance M1 (Zunchi)
- Brilliance M2 (Junjie)
- Brilliance M3 (Kubao)
- Brilliance Tun (Dolphin)
- Brilliance V3
- Brilliance V5
- Brilliance V6
- Brilliance V7
- Brilliance B8
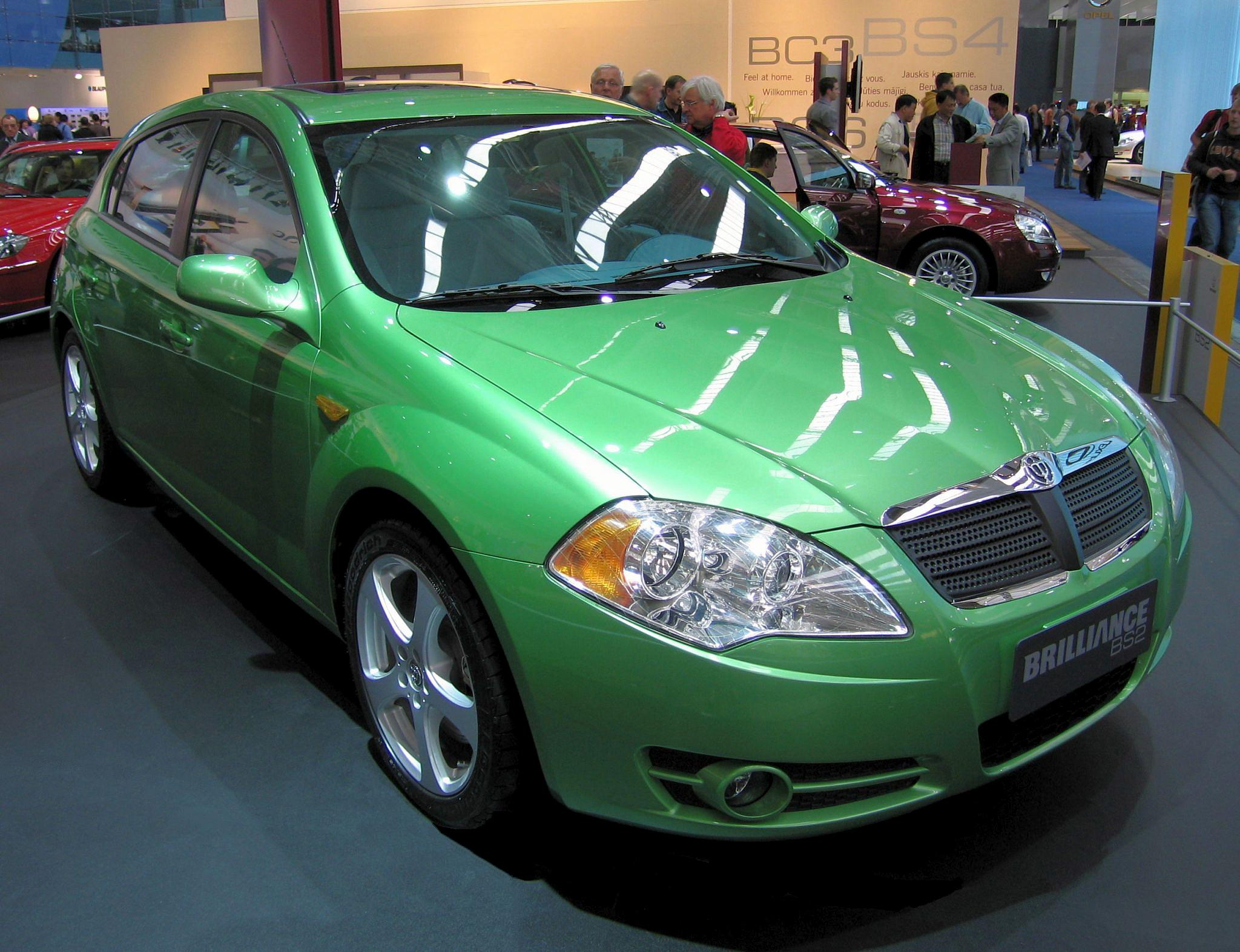
Brilliance BS2

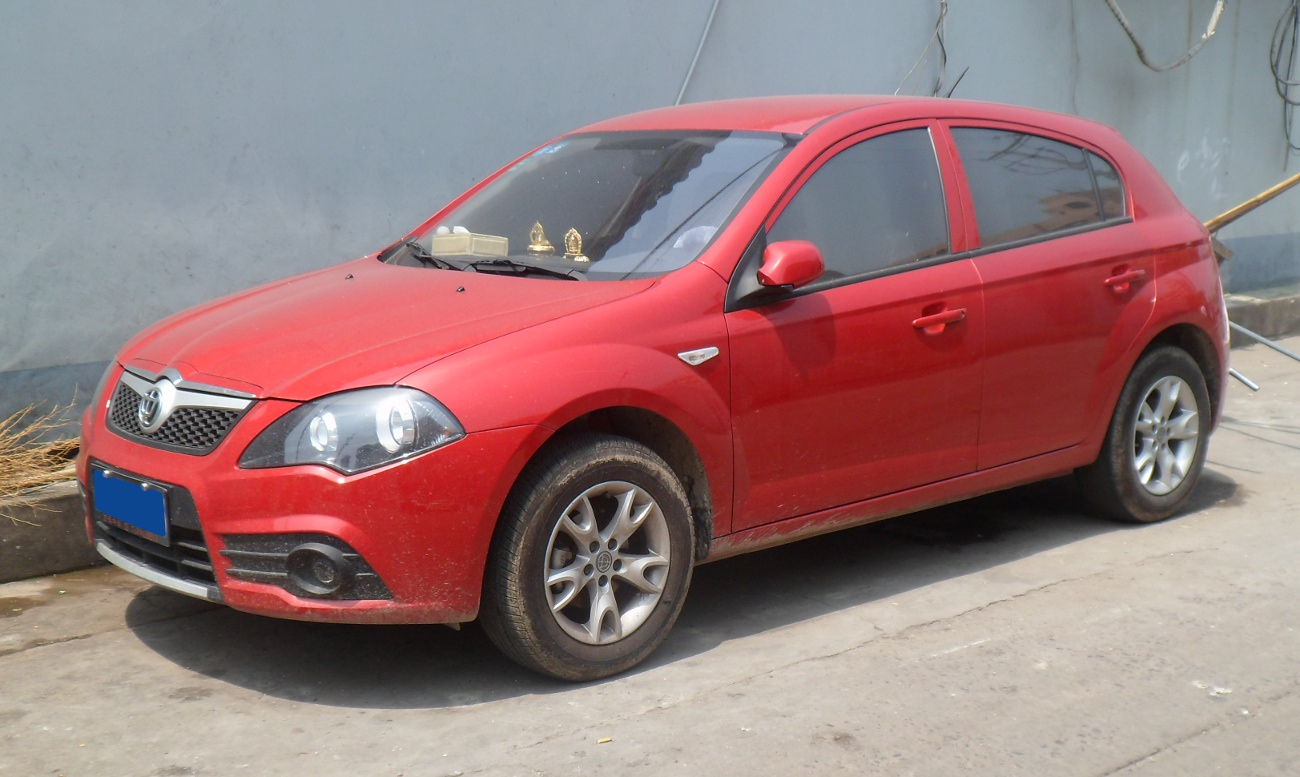
Brilliance FRV

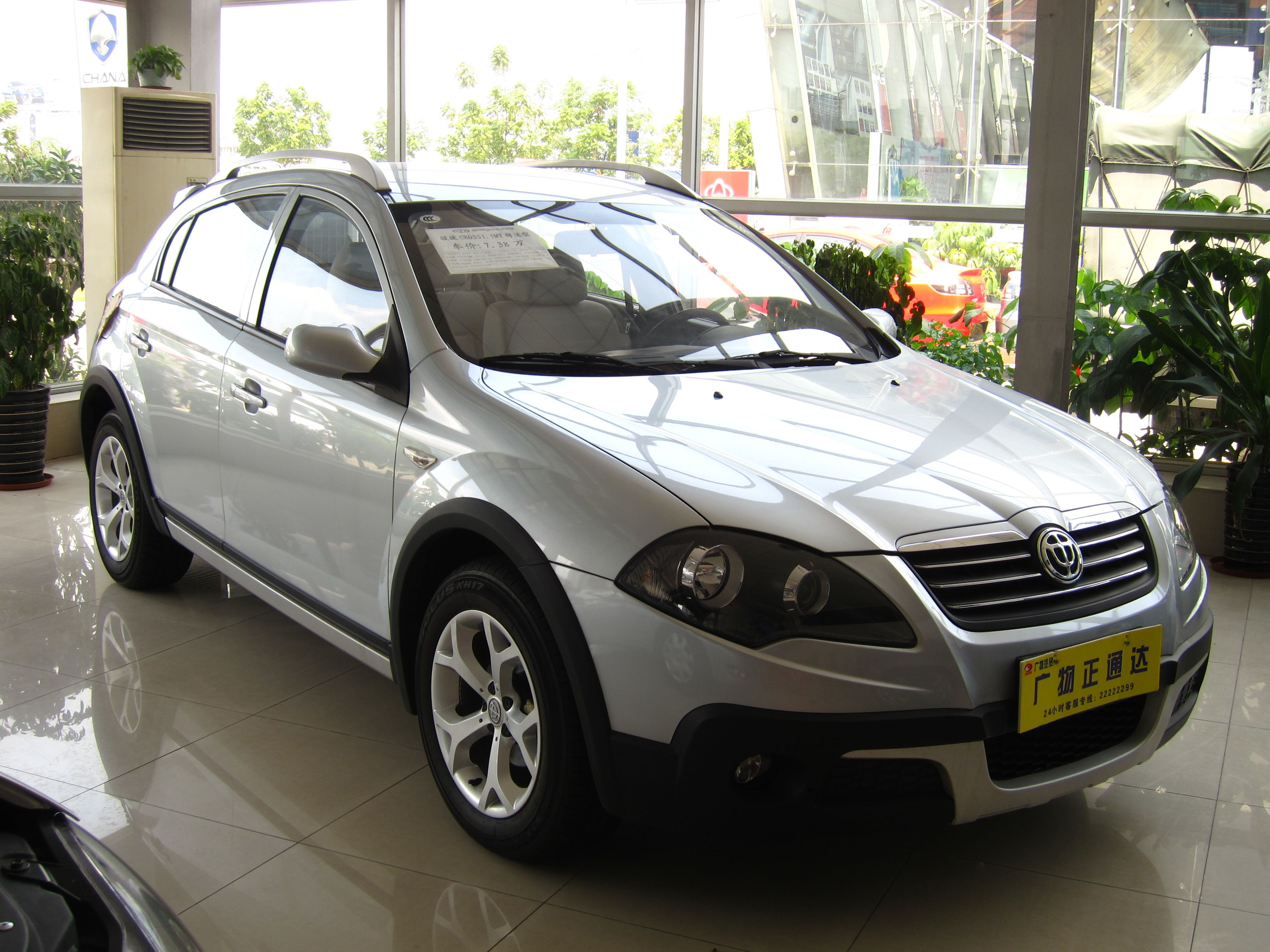
Brilliance FRV Cross

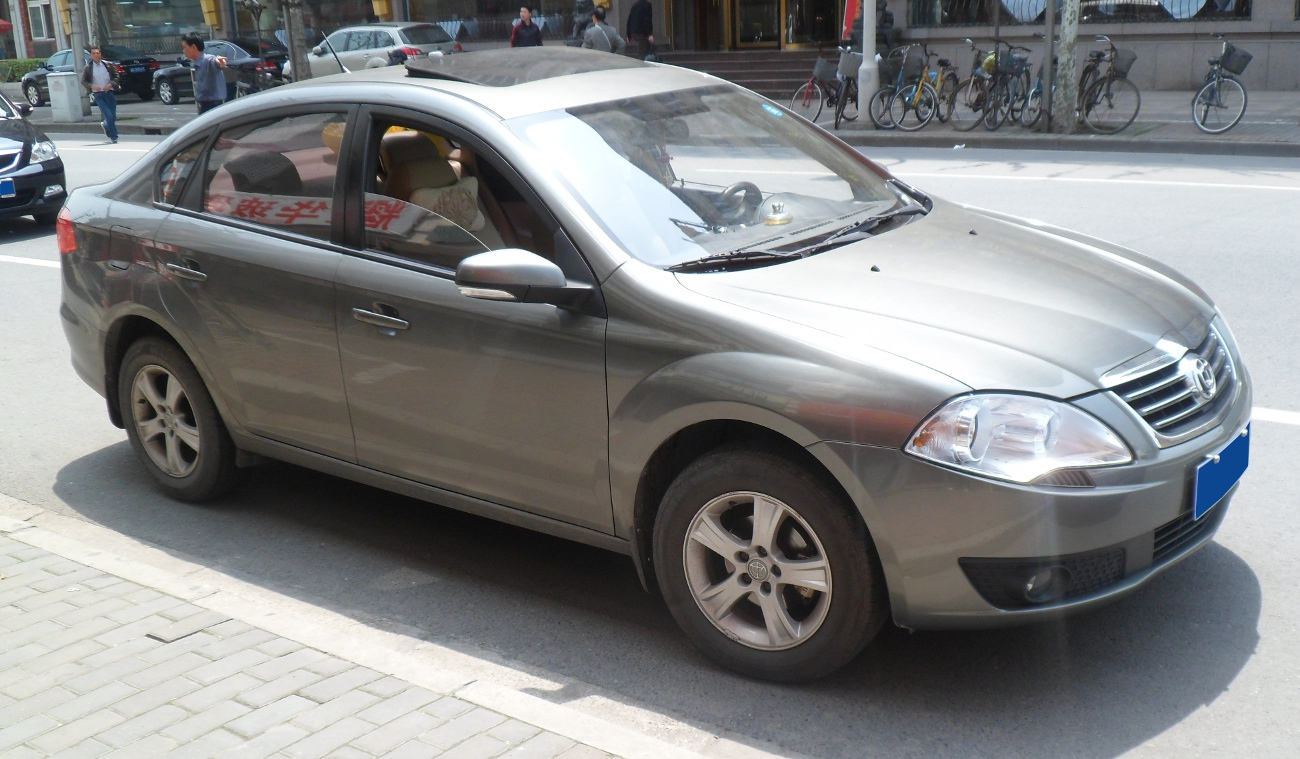
Brilliance FSV

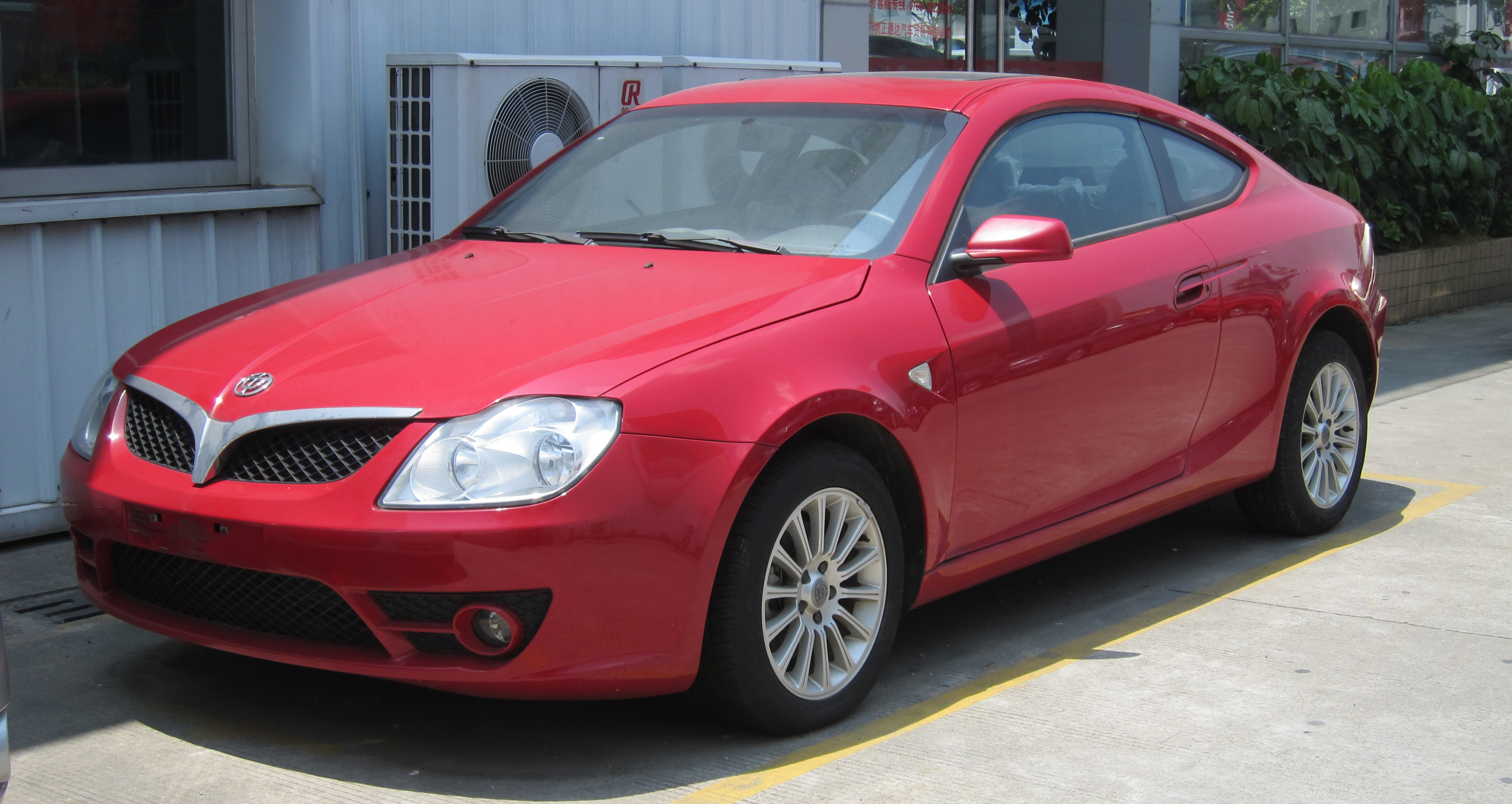
Brilliance BC3

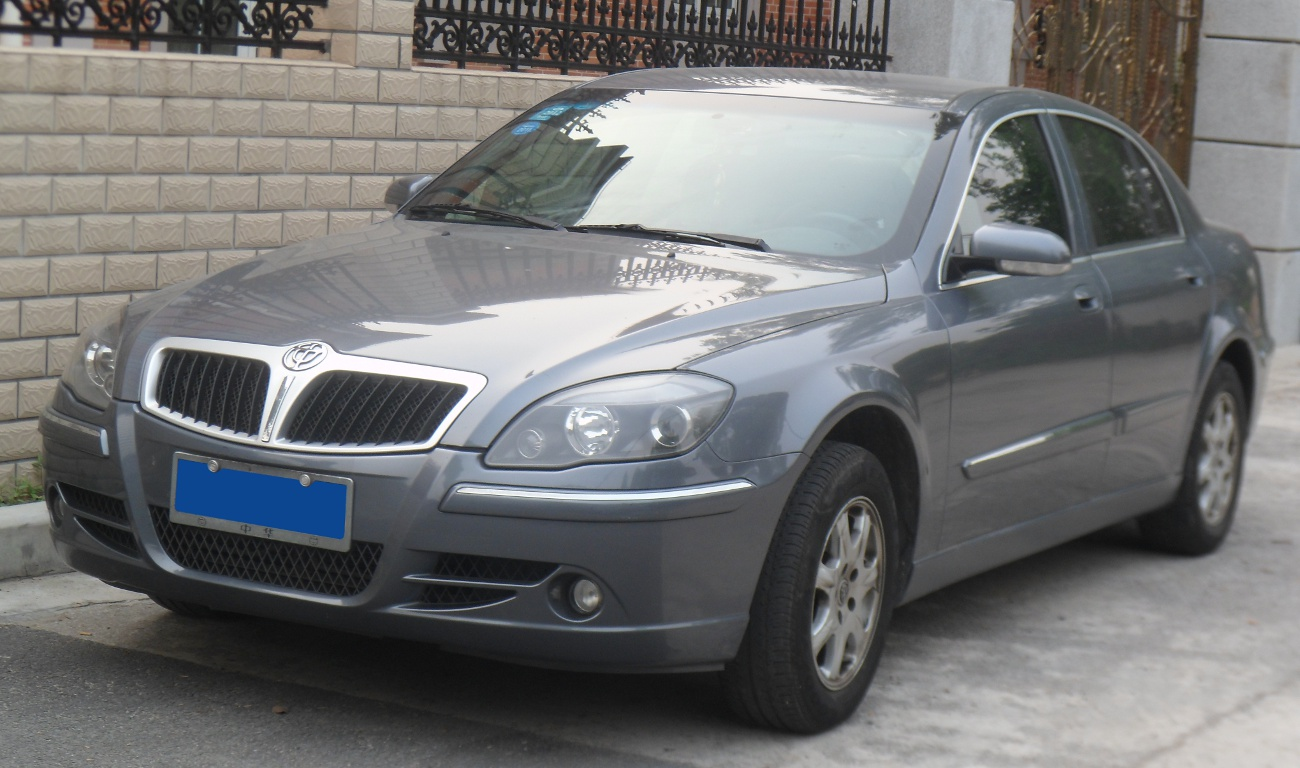
Brilliance BS4

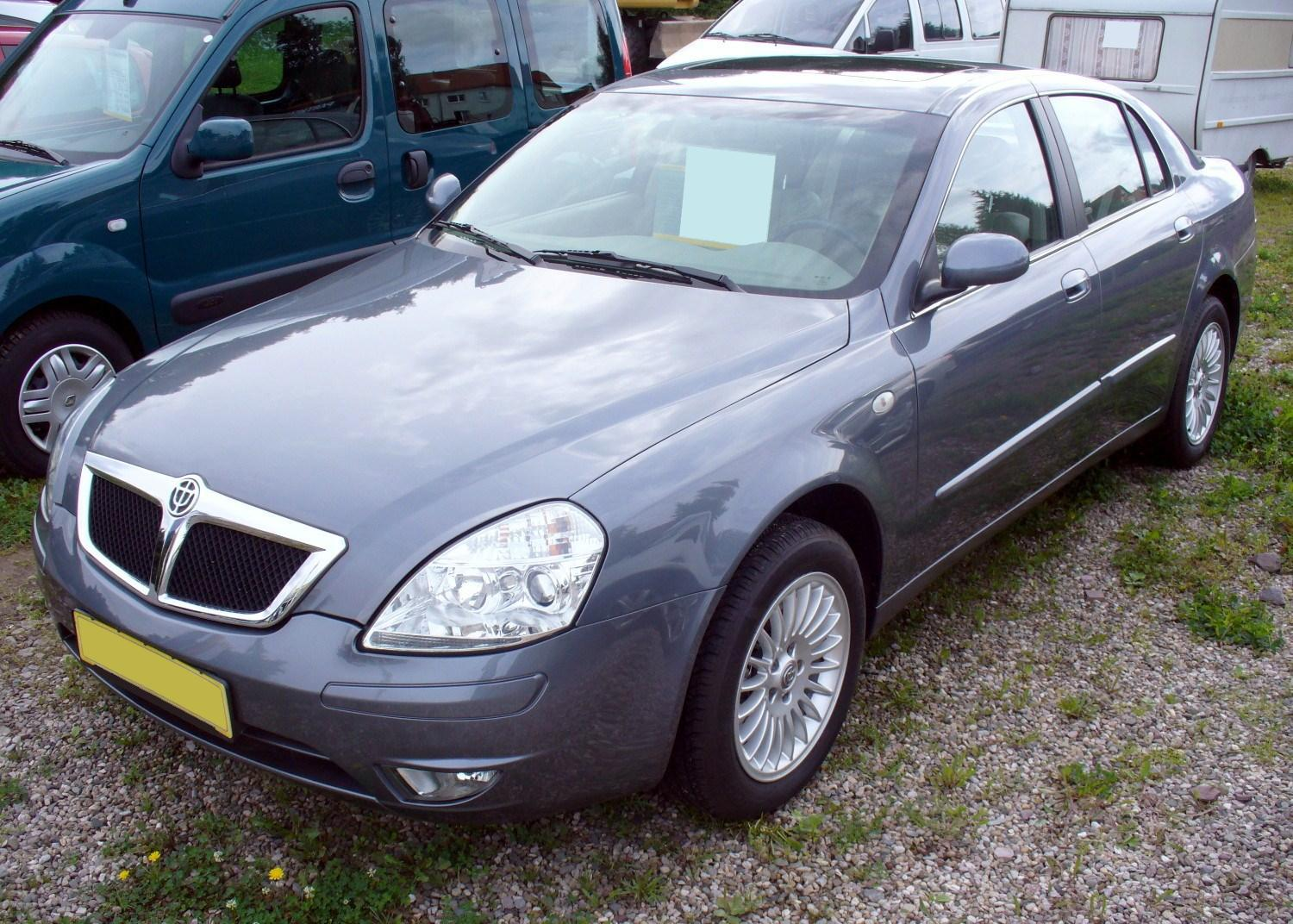
Brilliance BS6

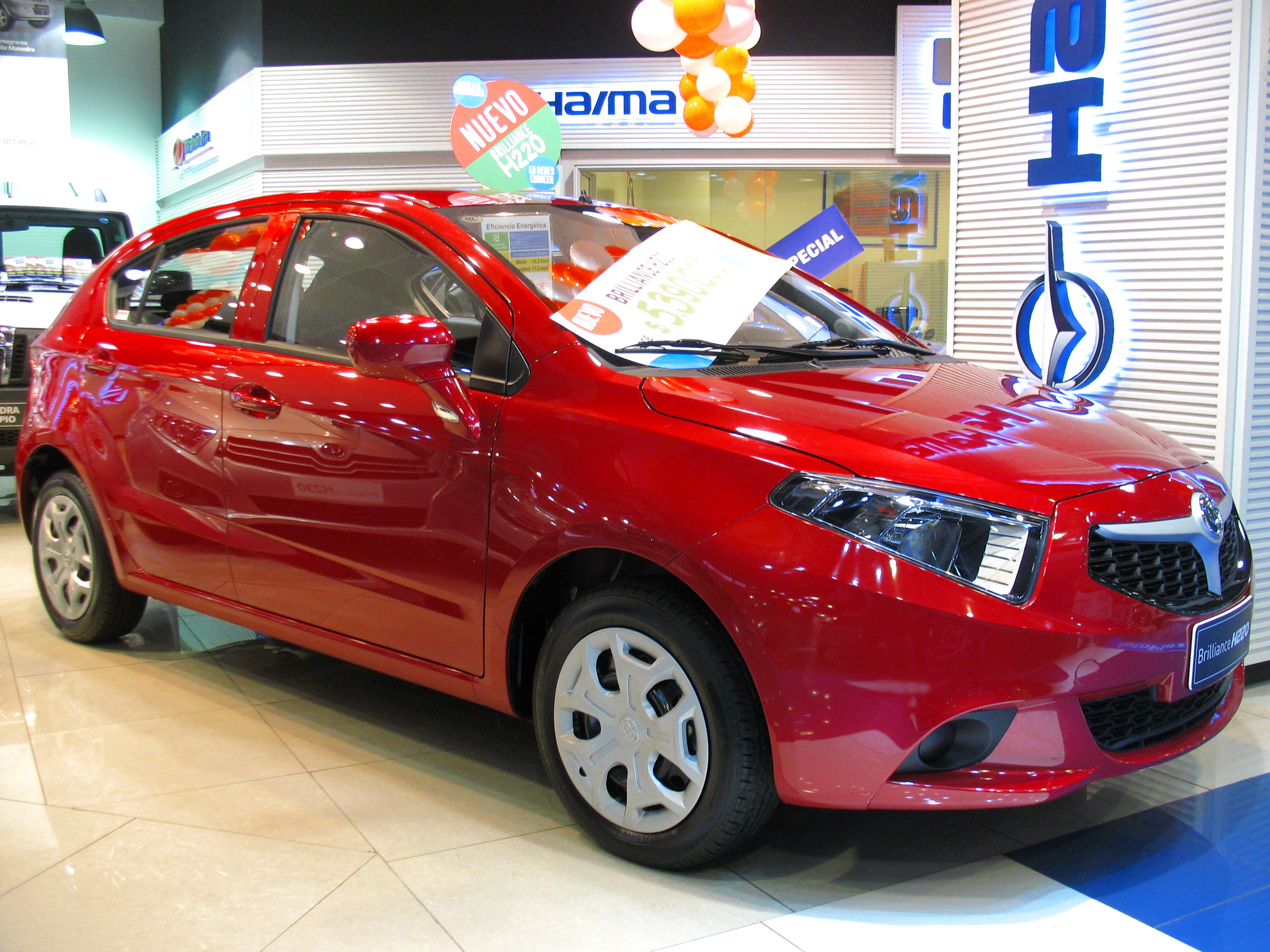
Brilliance H220

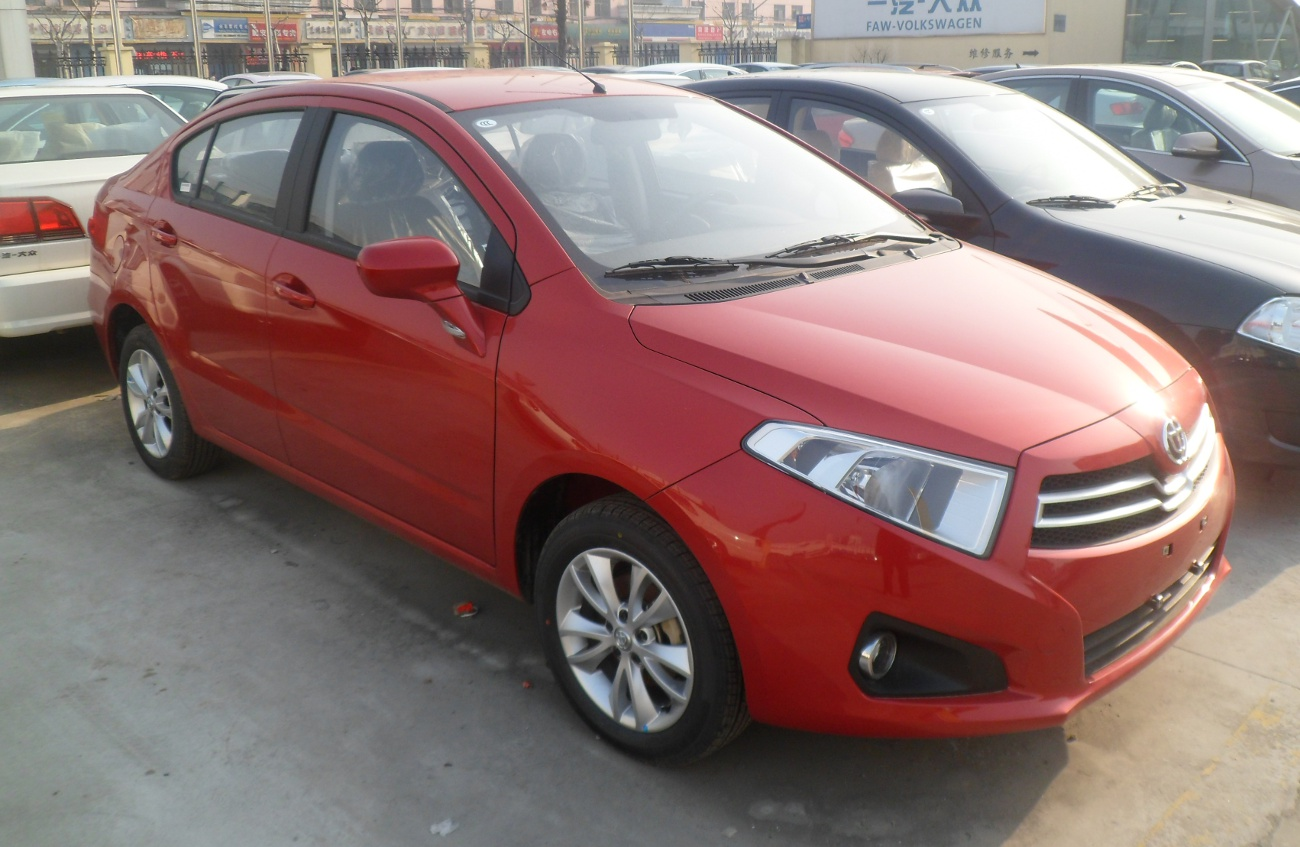
Brilliance H230

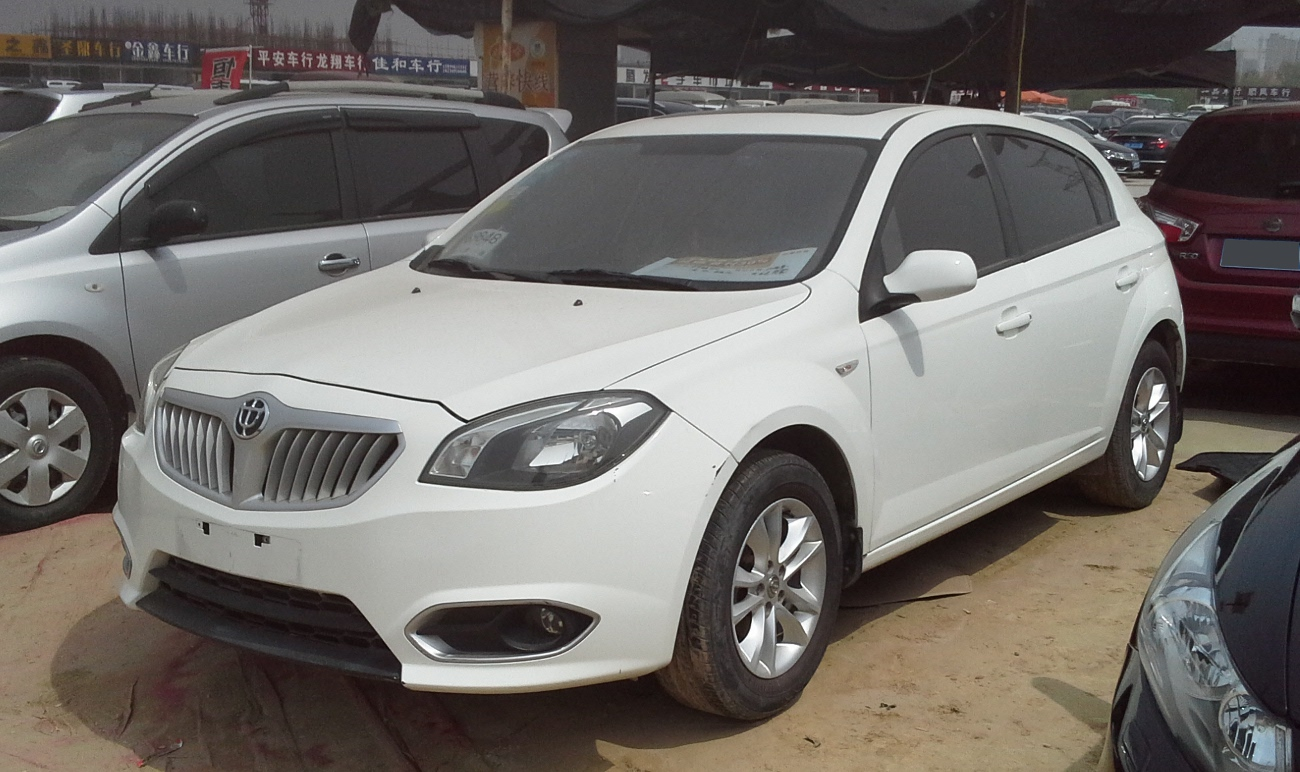
Brilliance H320

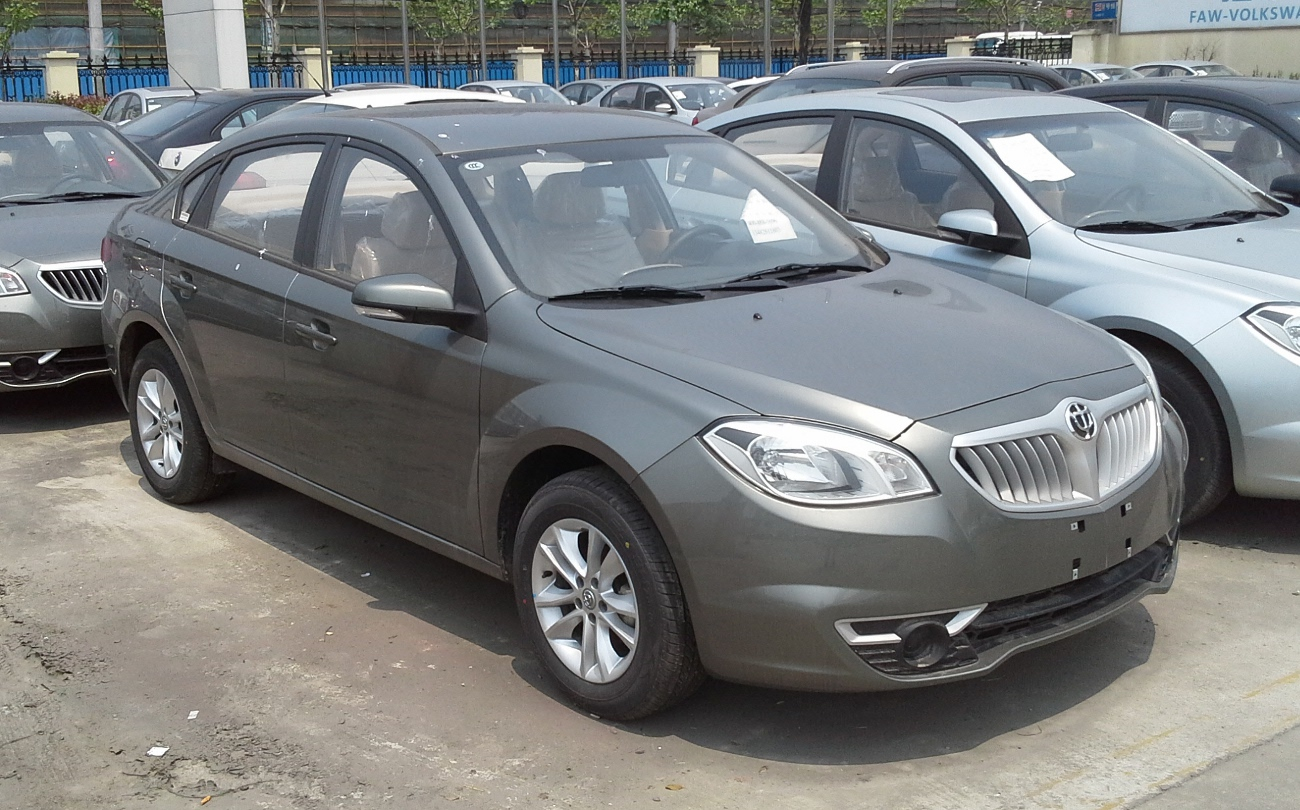
Brilliance H330

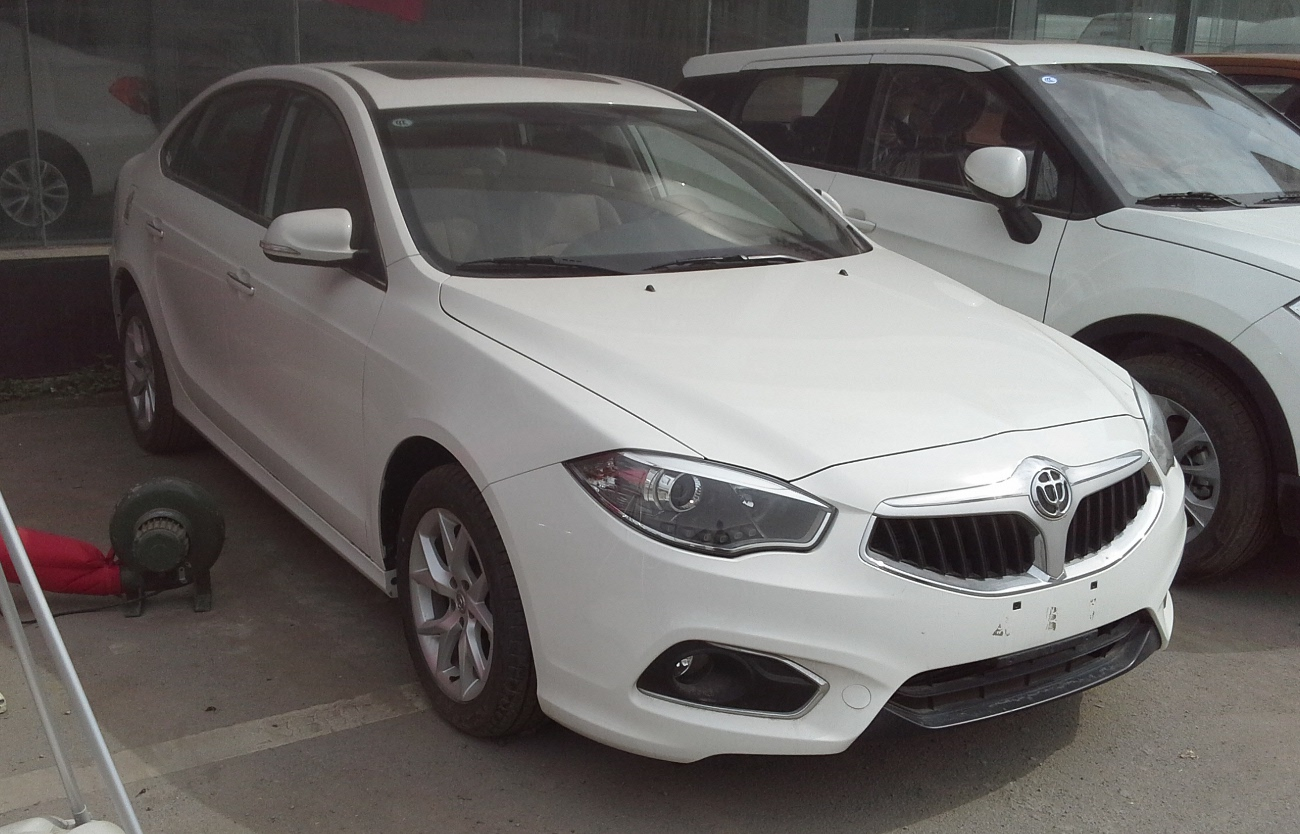
Brilliance H530

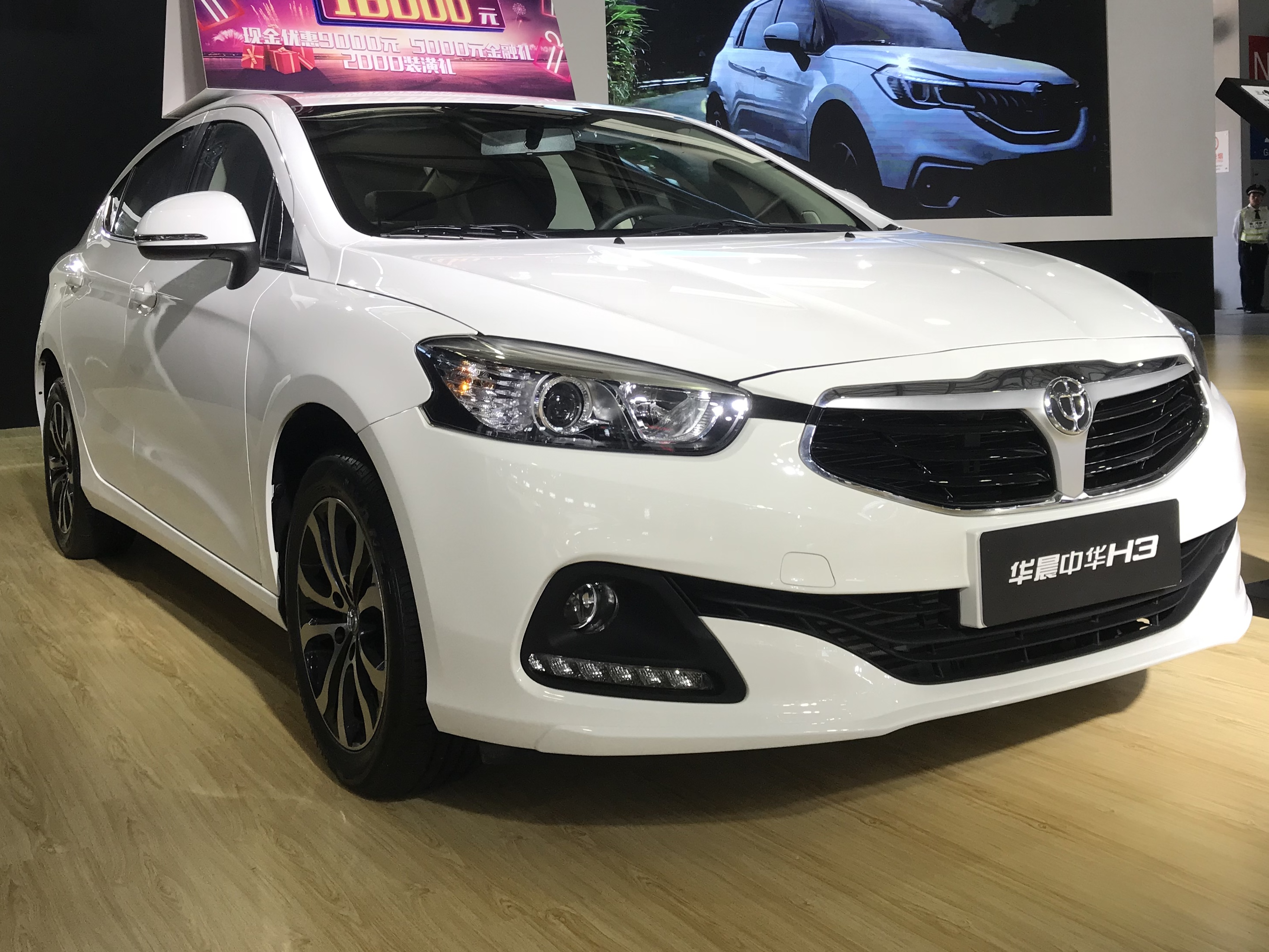
Brilliance H3

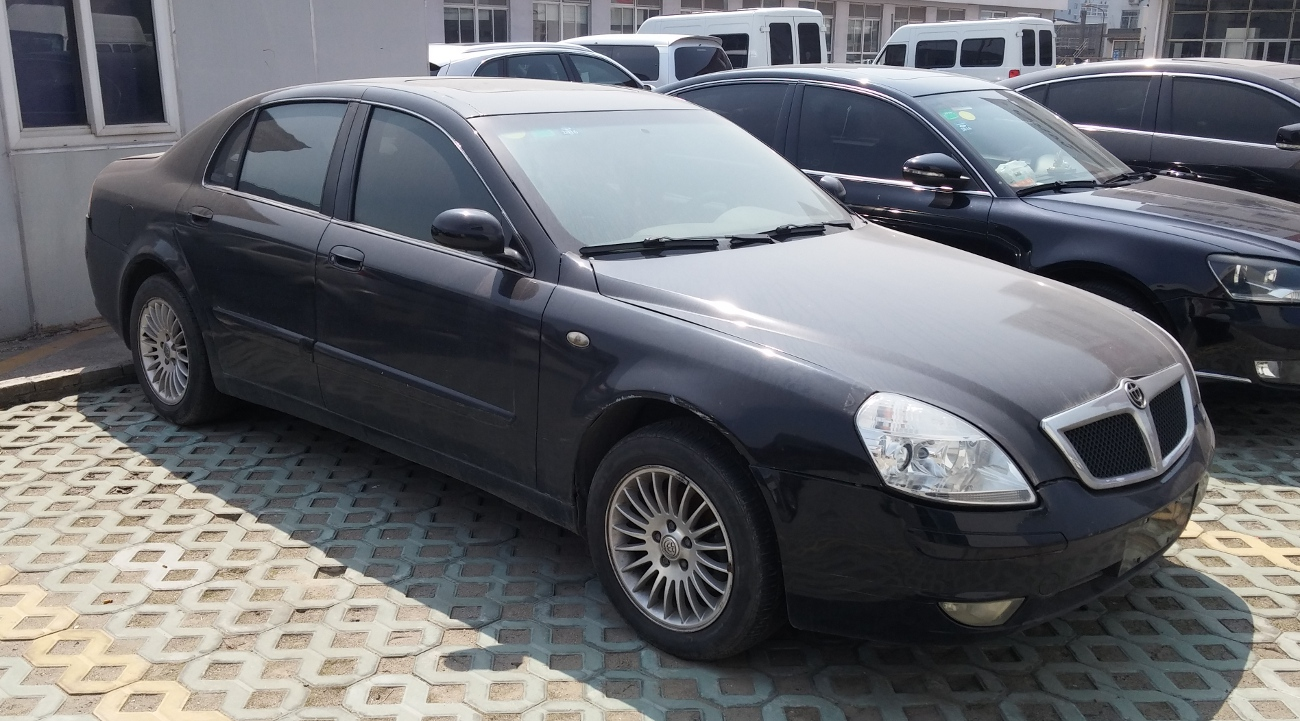
Brilliance M1

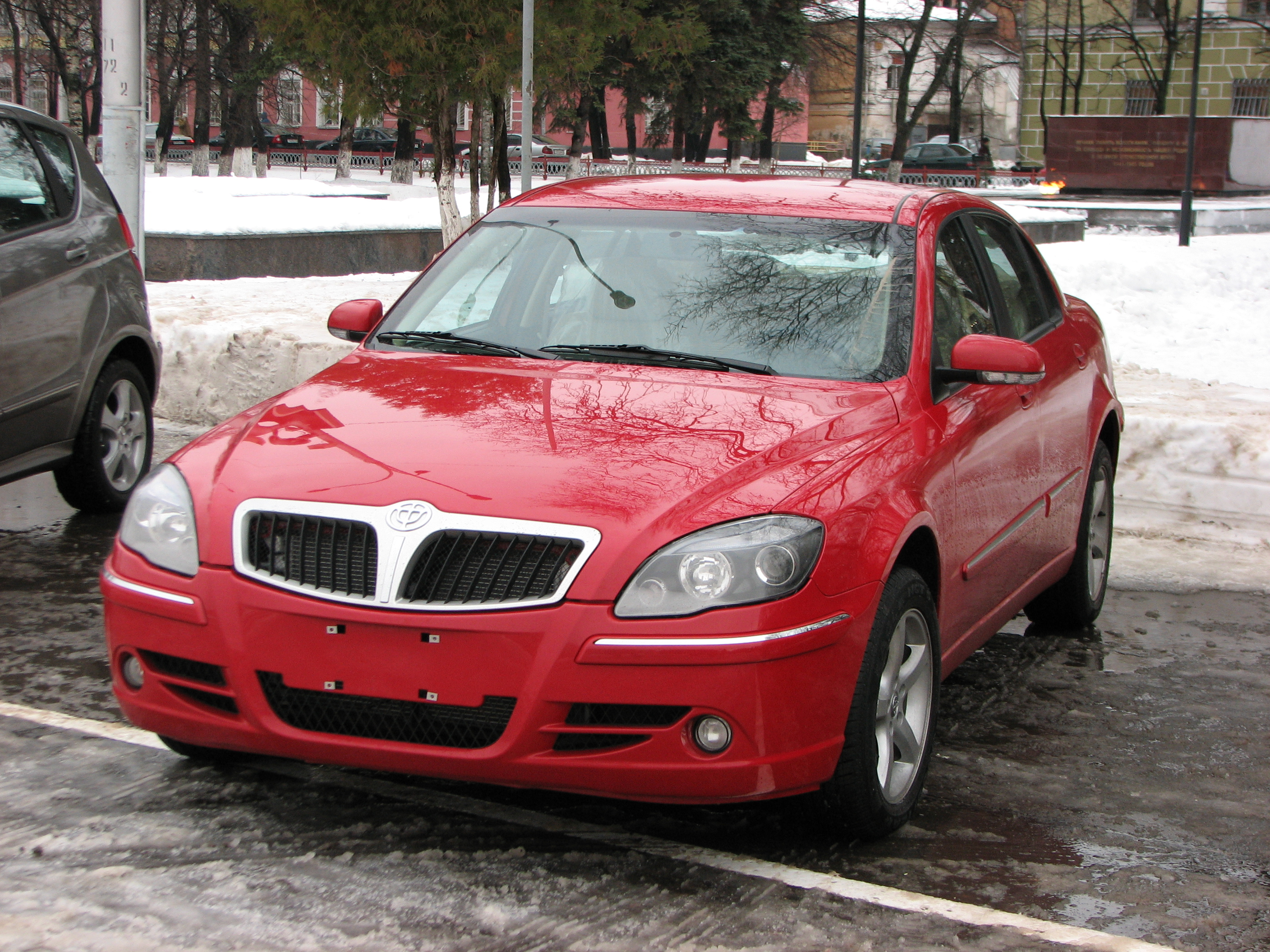
Brilliance M2

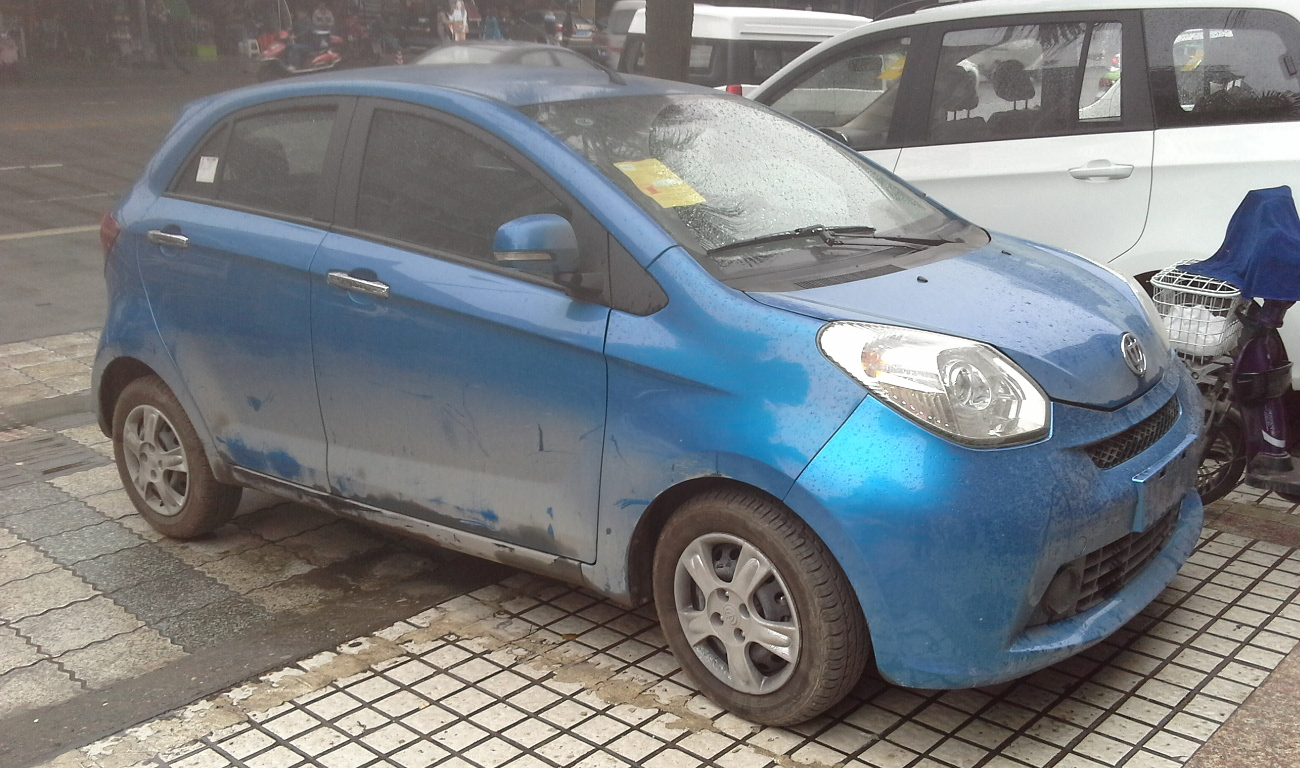
Brilliance Tun

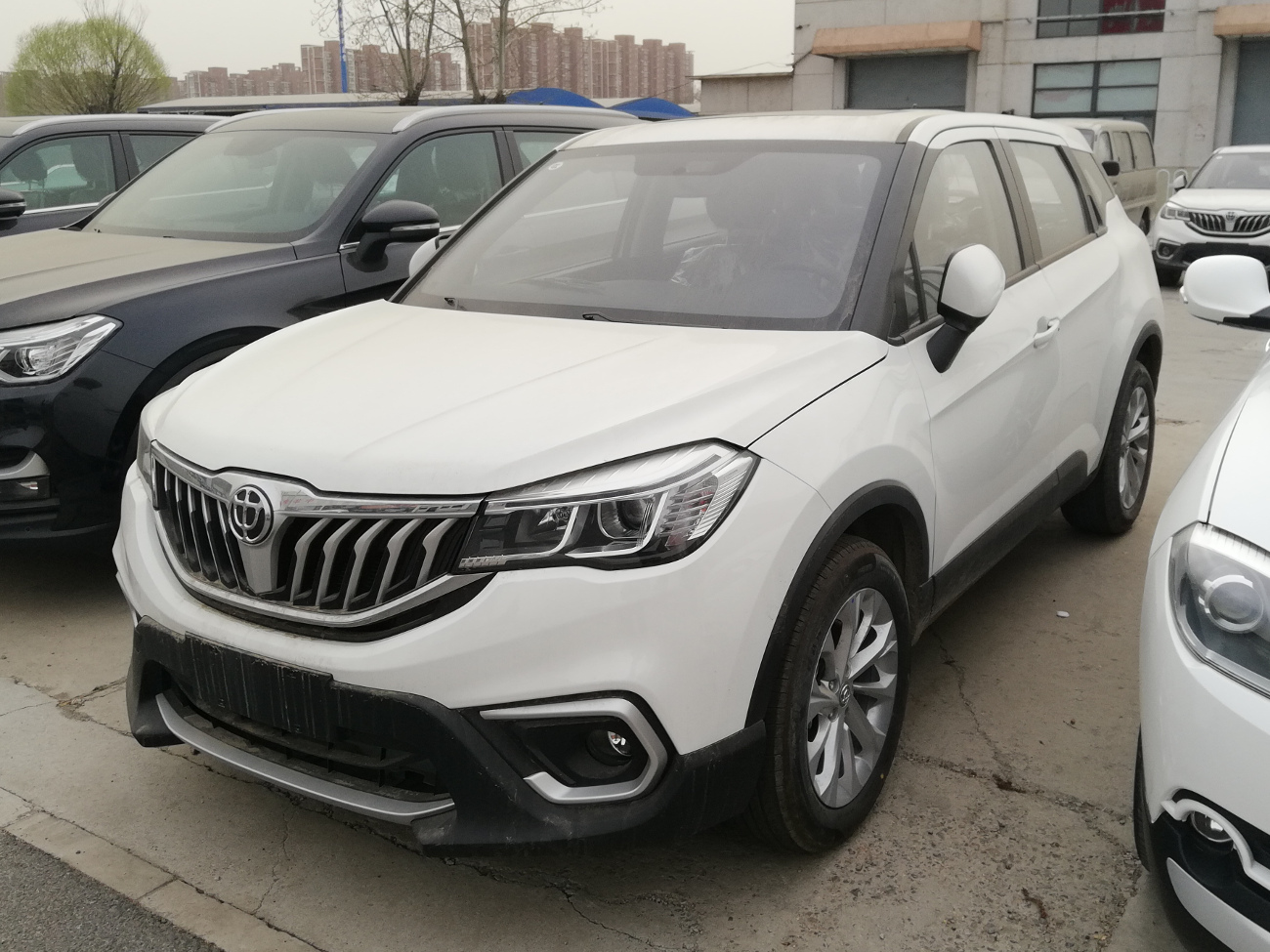
Brilliance V3

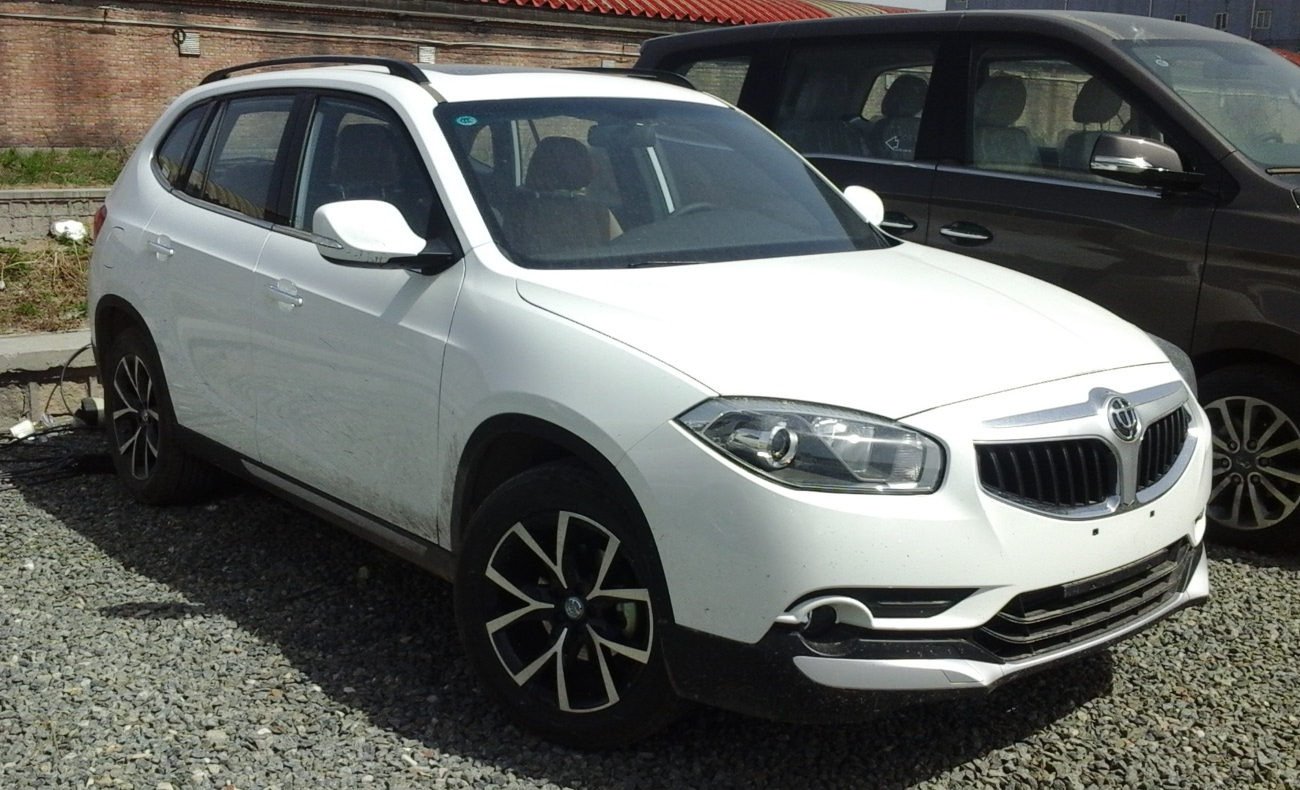
Brilliance V5

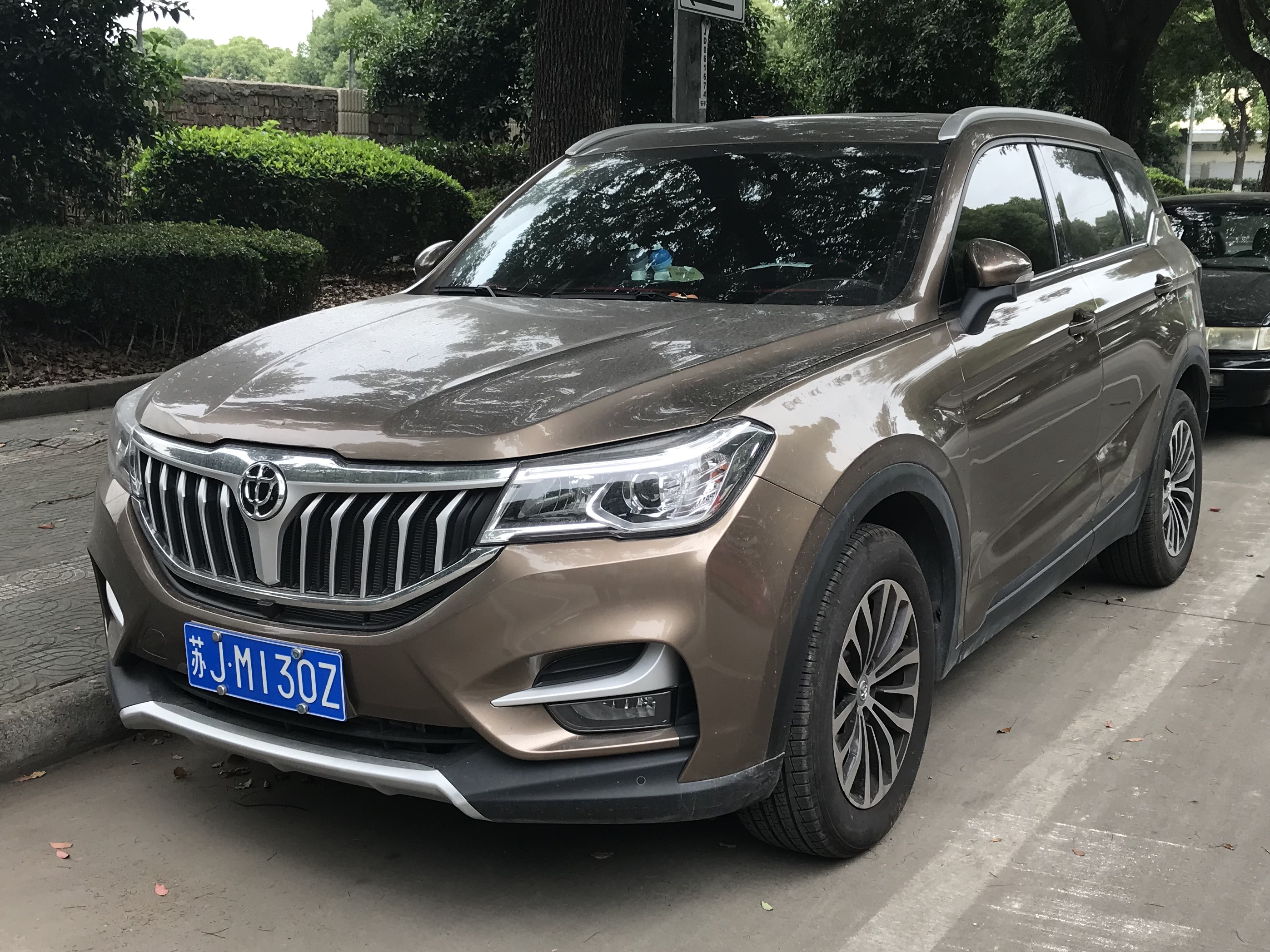
Brilliance V6

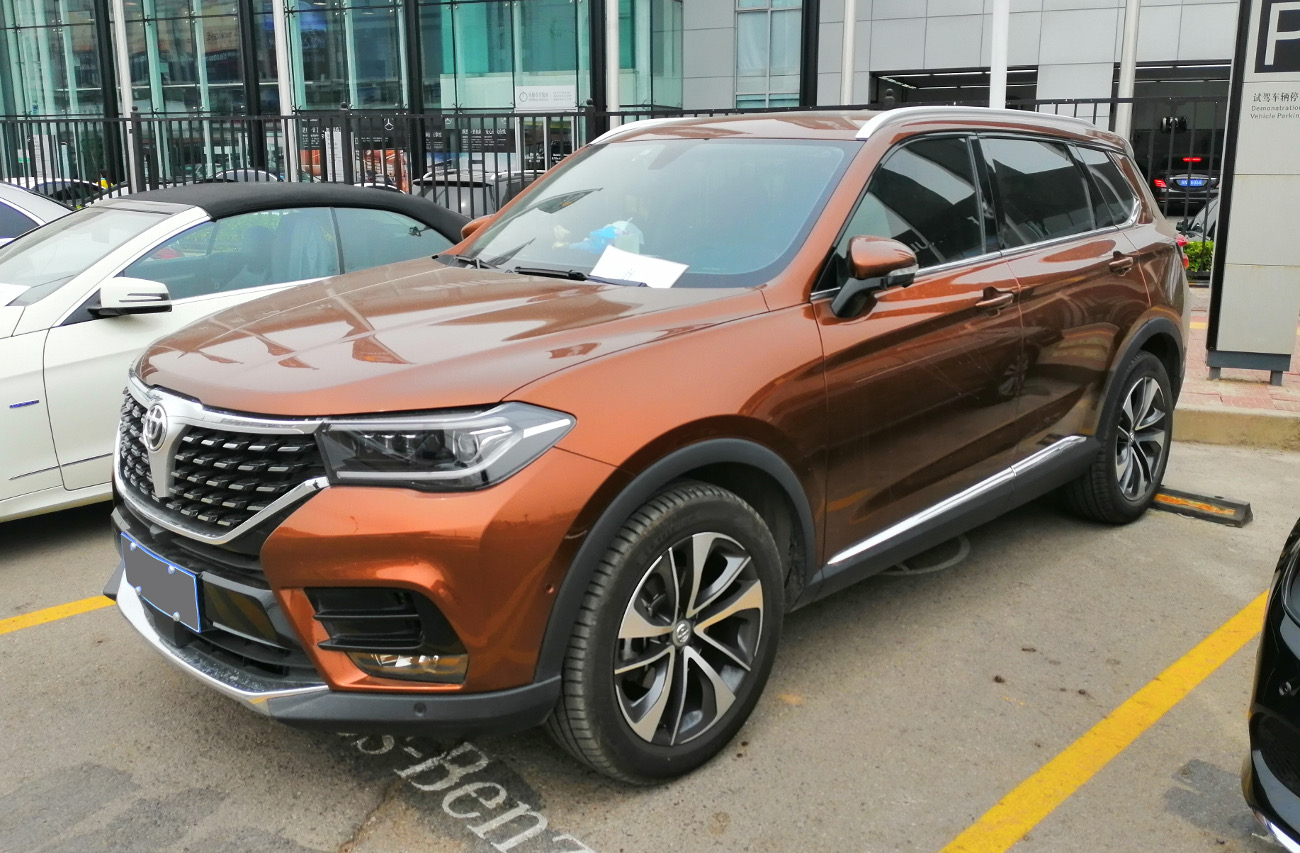
Brilliance V7

=== Huasong ===
Huasong is an automobile brand specializing in vans created in 2014 to 2020 by Brilliance Auto.

- Huasong 7
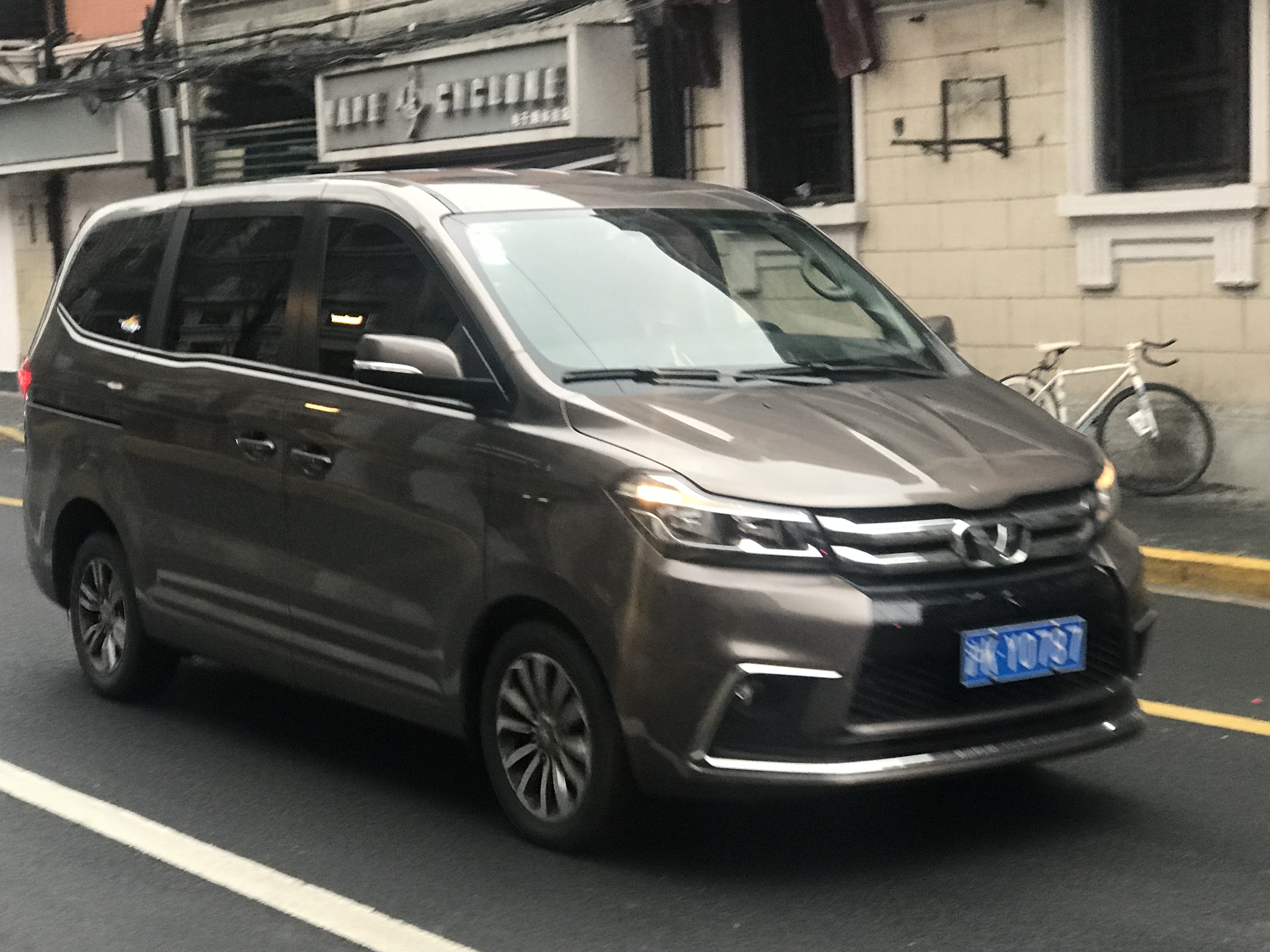
Brilliance Huasong 7

=== Xinri ===
Brilliance Xinri New Energy Automotive Co., Ltd was founded in October 2018, and the first stage plant was completed and put into operation in December 2020.

- Brilliance Xinri i03
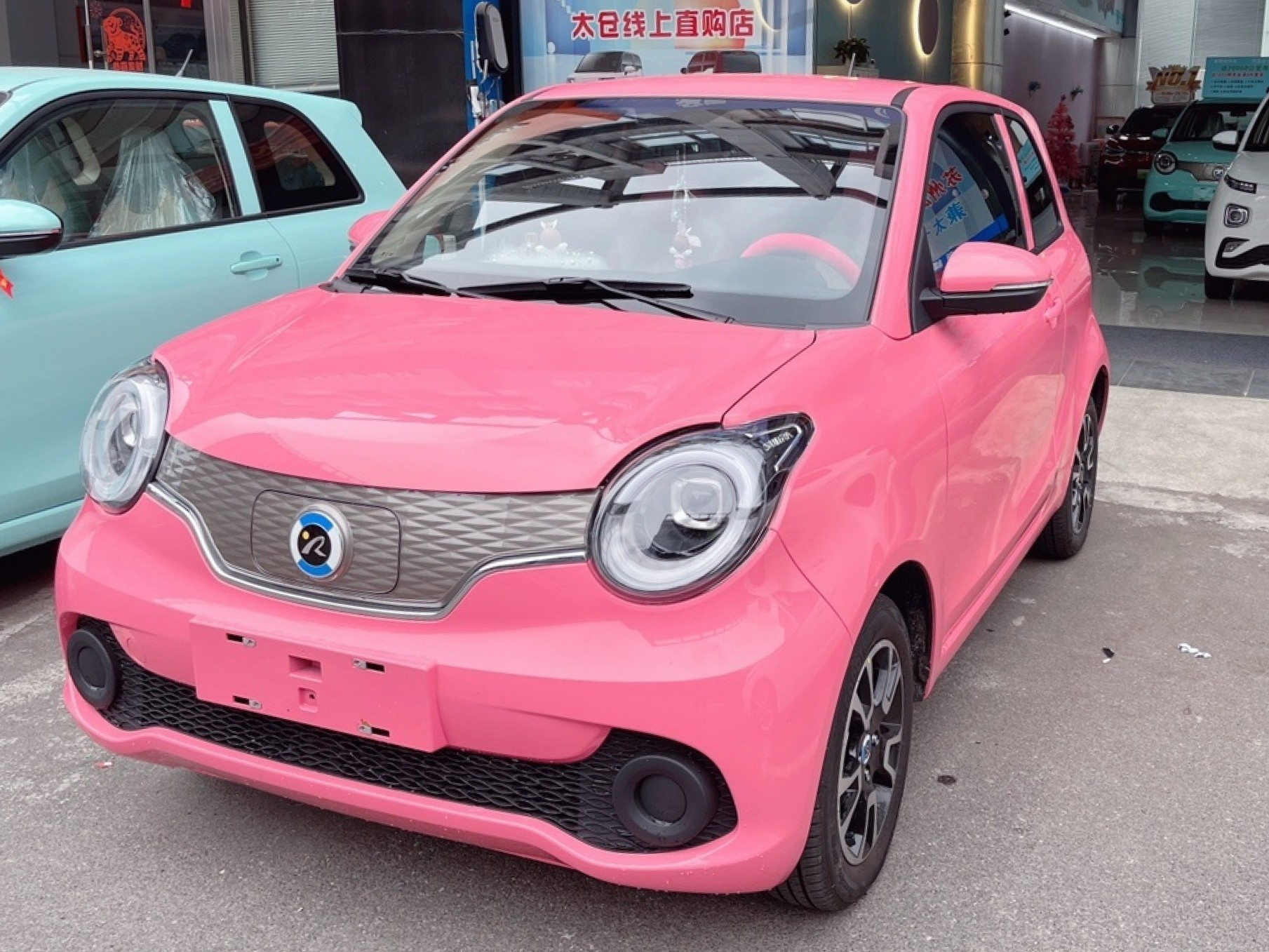
Brilliance Xinri i03

== Joint ventures and alliances ==
=== BMW Brilliance ===
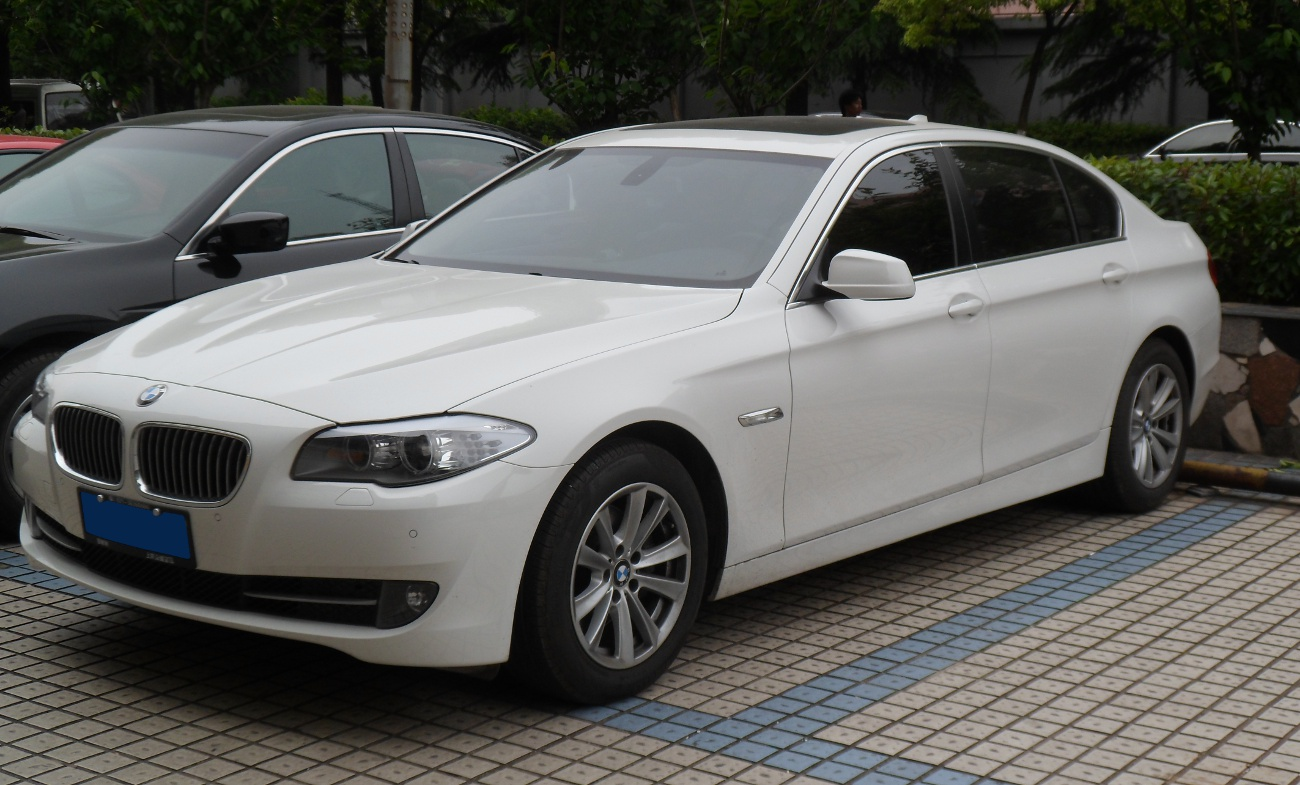
A BMW 5-Series LWB produced by BMW Brilliance

In 2003, BMW and Brilliance agreed to make select products of this German luxury carmaker in China. As of 2010, the joint venture made the BMW 3 Series and BMW 5 Series and had plans to introduce the BMW X1 by 2012. As of 2011, locally produced engines were slated to appear in some offerings soon, and the company had plans to bring up total production capacity to 300,000 by 2013.

These vehicles may differ slightly from those sold in other markets under the same names. As of mid-2010 almost 60% of the components used to manufacture the China-built BMWs were imported to China.

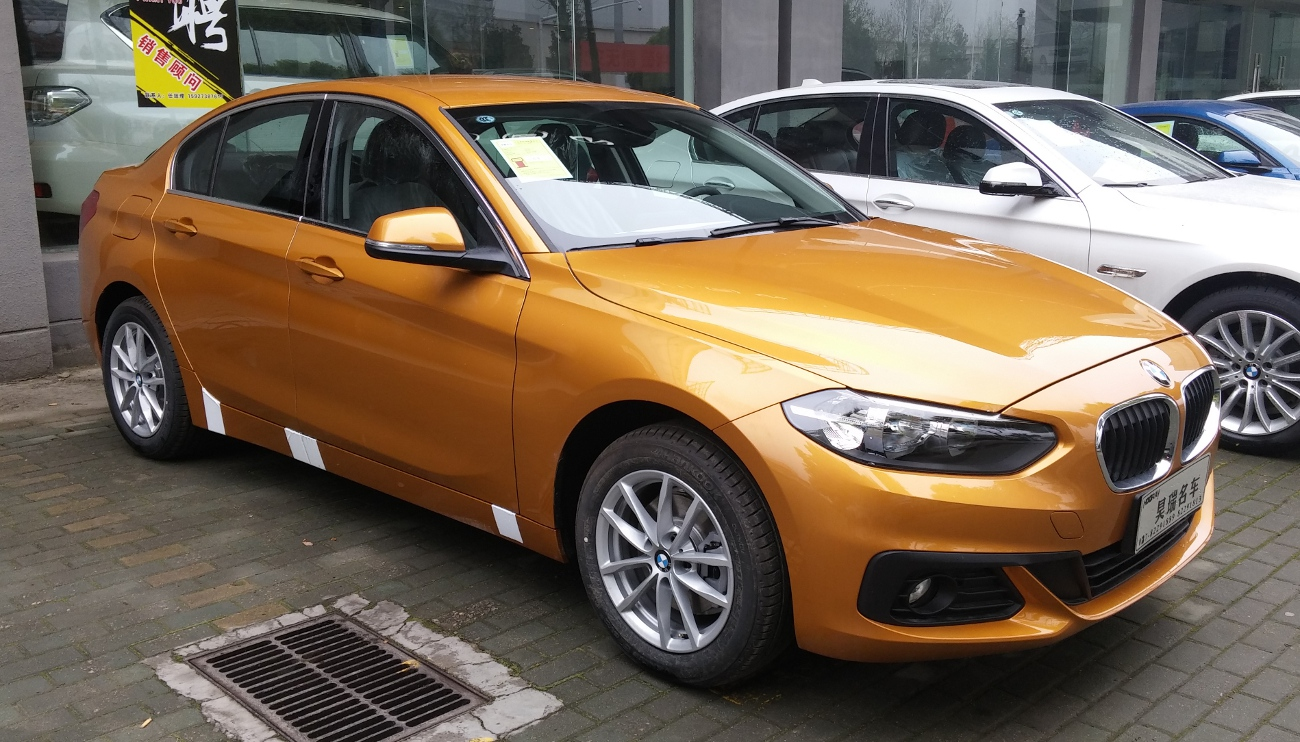
BMW Brilliance 1-Series F52

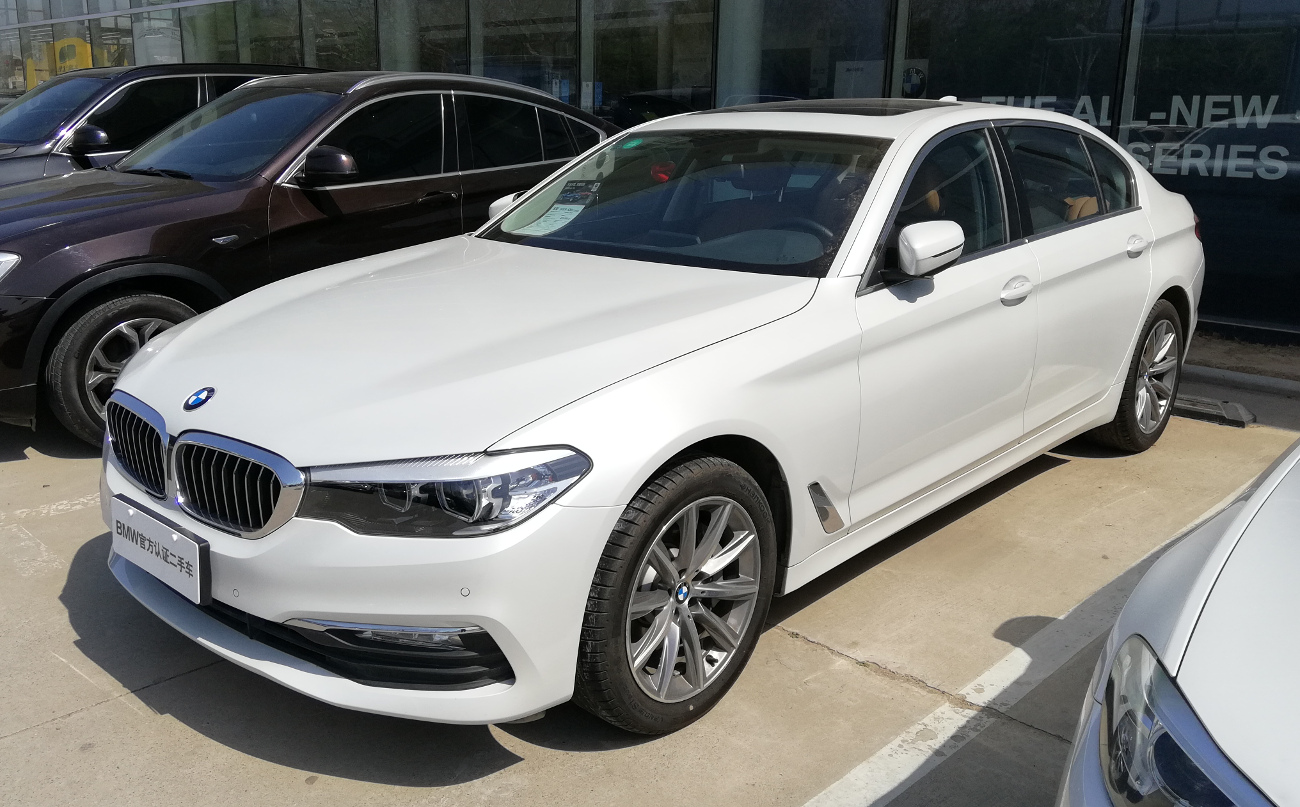
BMW Brilliance 5-Series G38 Li

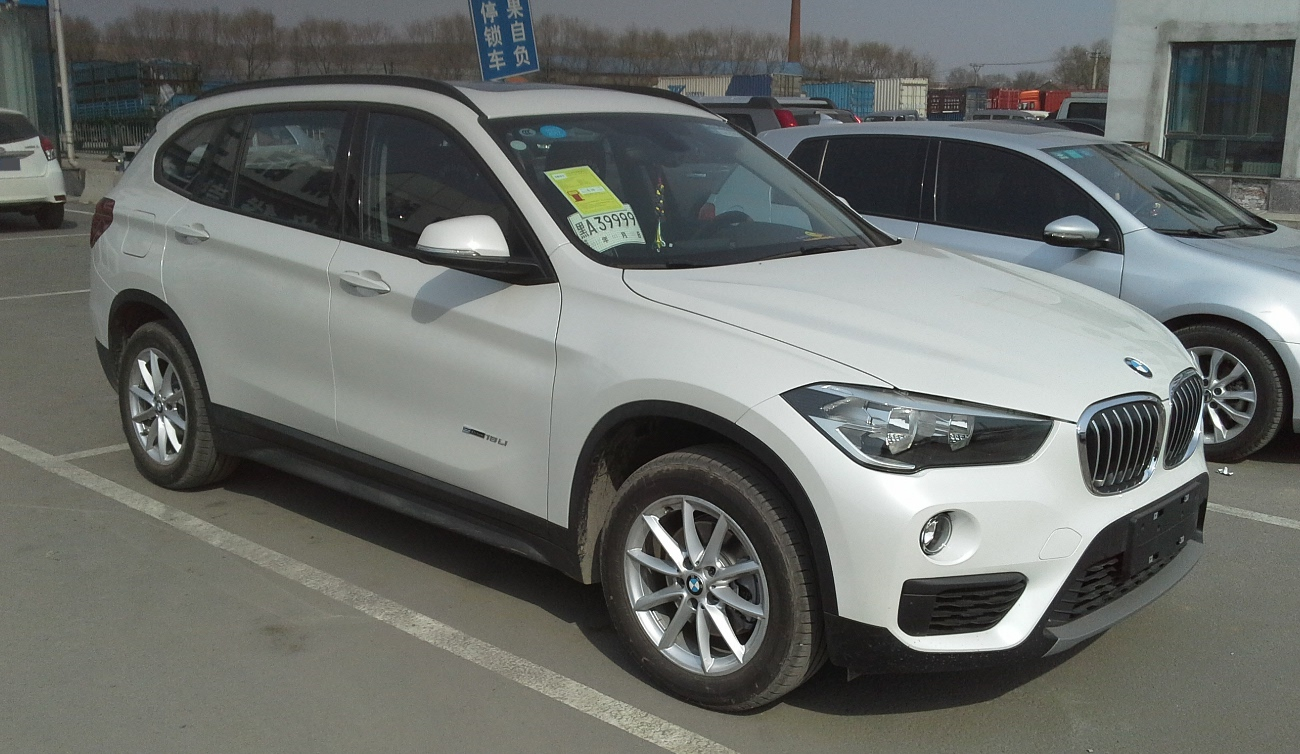
BMW Brilliance X1-Series F49 Li

=== Brilliance Shineray ===
Brilliance Shineray is a joint venture between Brilliance Auto Group and Shineray Motorcycle Company (Shineray Group), one of China's largest motorcycle producers. Shineray Group bought the Italian motorcycle brand, SWM (motorcycles), and started an automotive brand with the SWM nameplate. SWM now makes a range of crossovers and compact MPVs.

Key models include:

- SWM G01
- SWM X7
- SWM X3
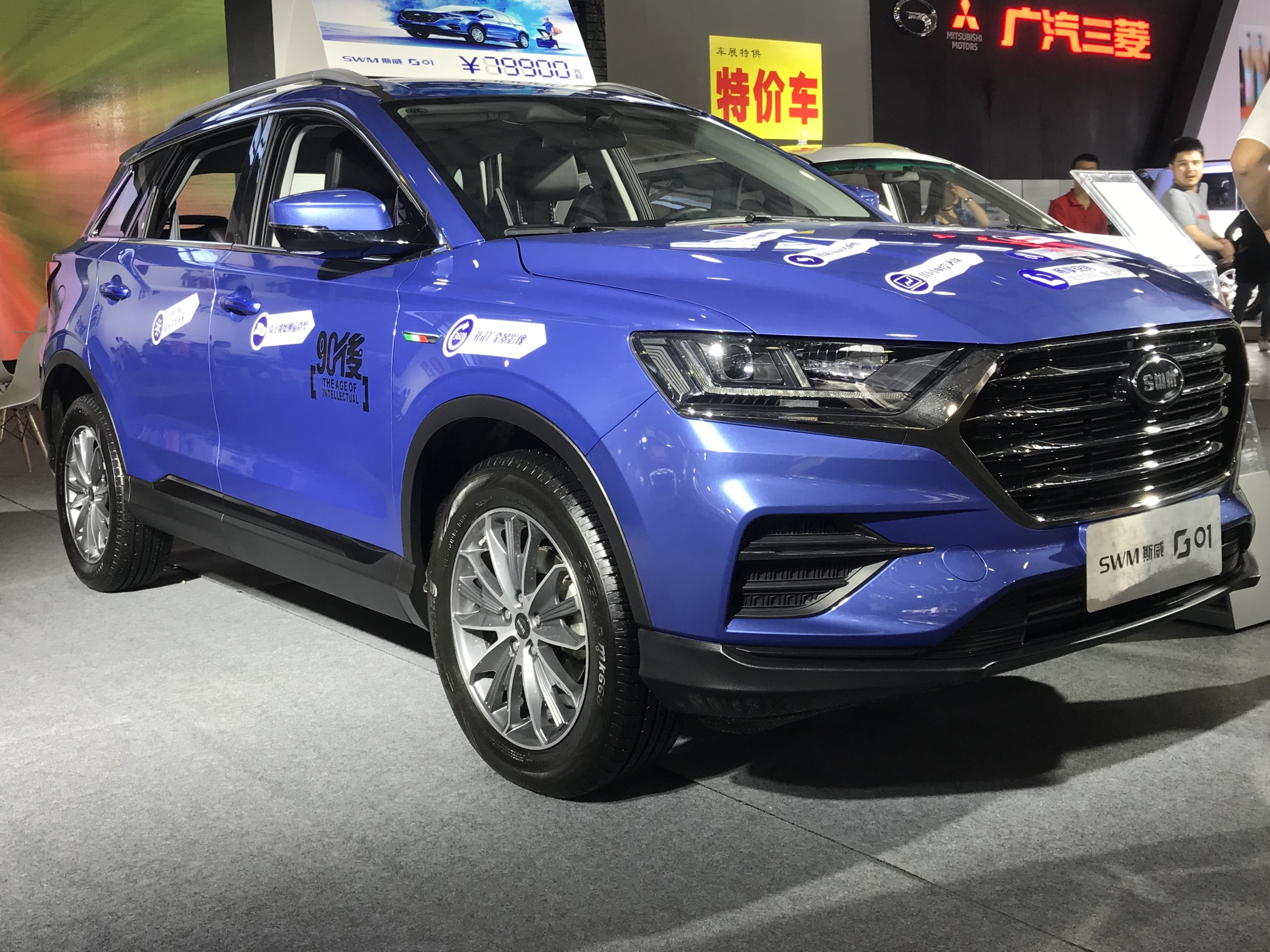
SWM G01

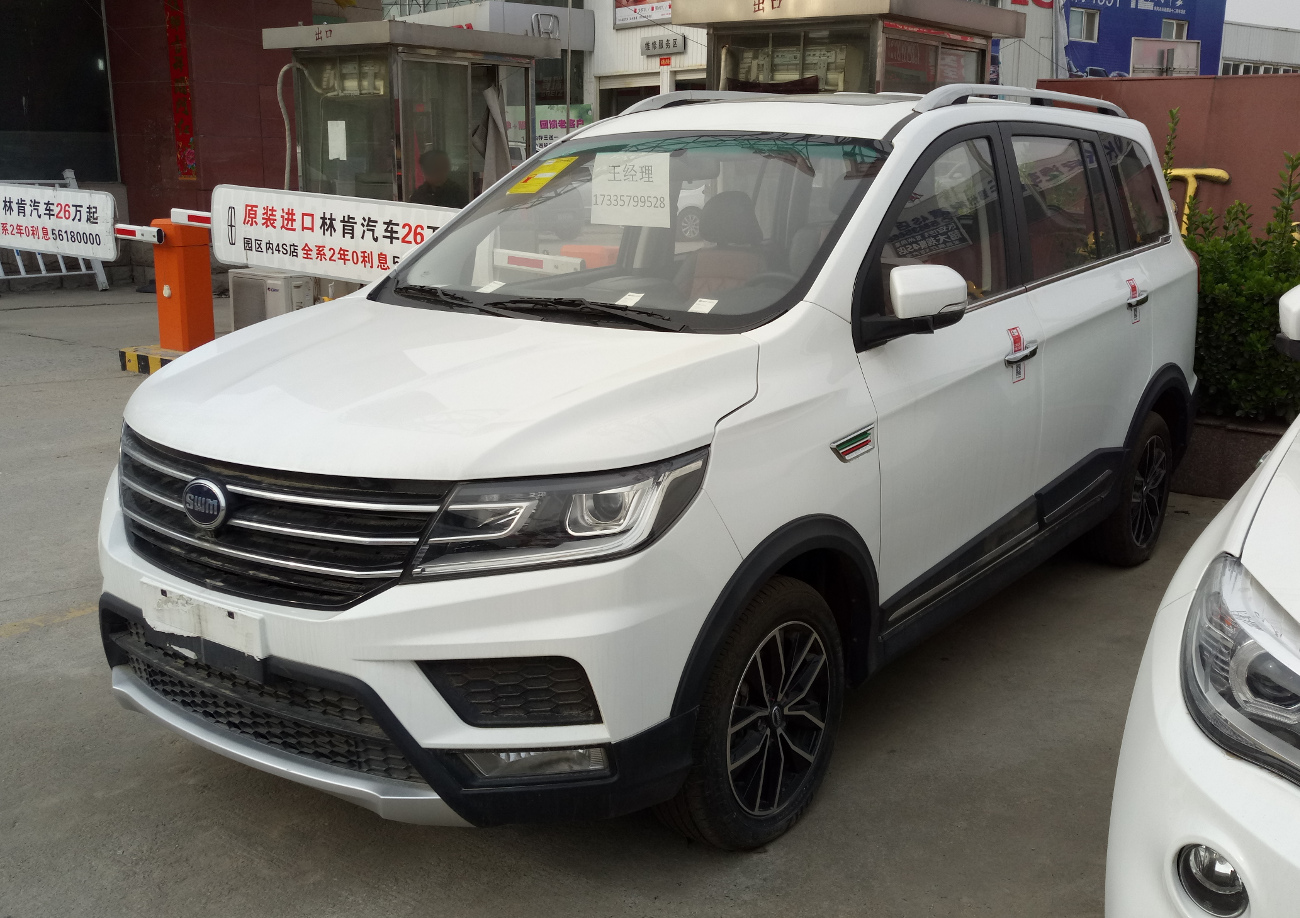
SWM X3

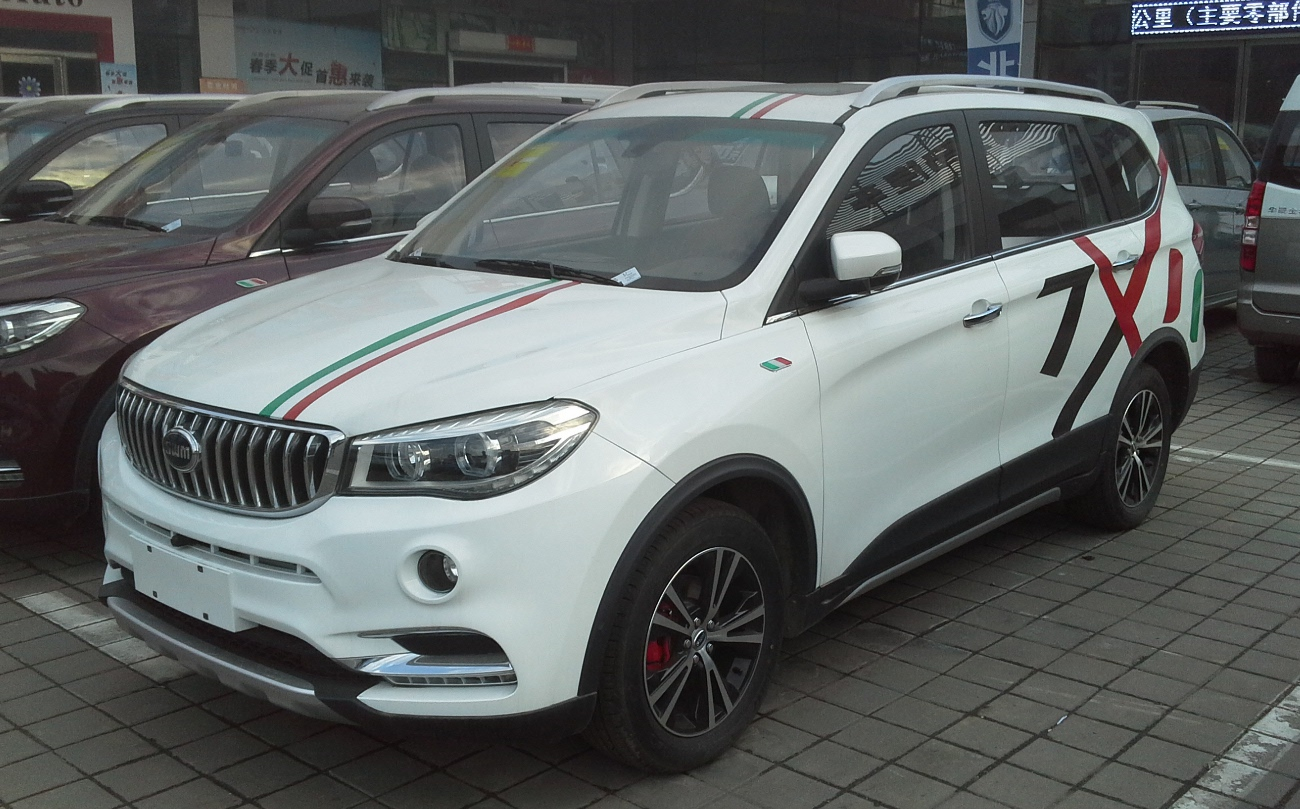
SWM X7

=== Renault Brilliance Jinbei (Jinbei) ===
Formerly a wholly owned subsidiary (Shenyang Brilliance Jinbei Automotive) which sold licensed Toyota and General Motors designs, Jinbei was re-formed with Renault in 2017 with plans to launch light commercial vehicles and SUVs with Renault technology, under the Jinbei and Renault marques.

Key models include:

- Jinbei Konect (Guanjing)
- Jinbei New Haise
- Jinbei F50
- Jinbei S70
- Jinbei Haishiwang
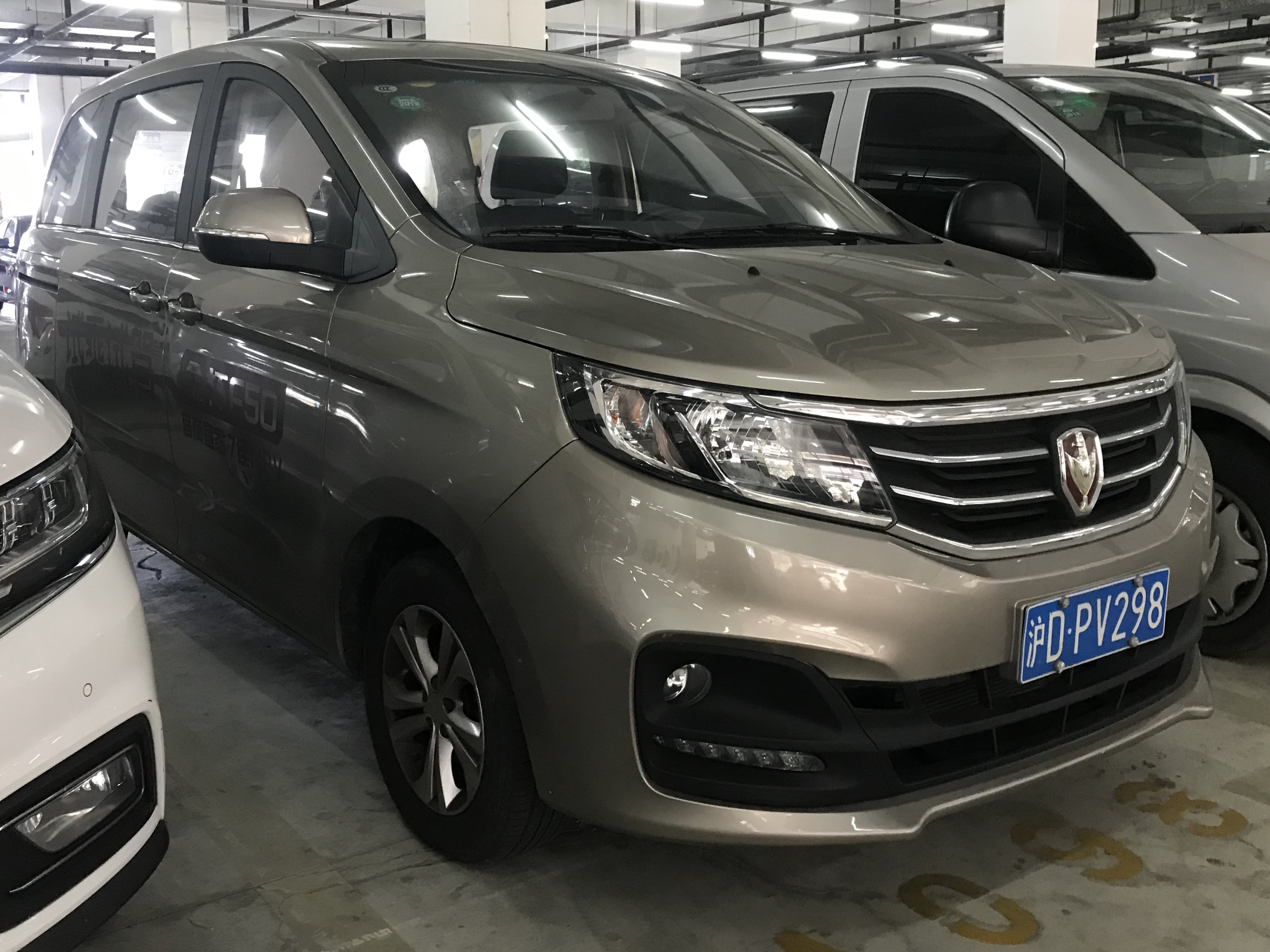
Jinbei F50

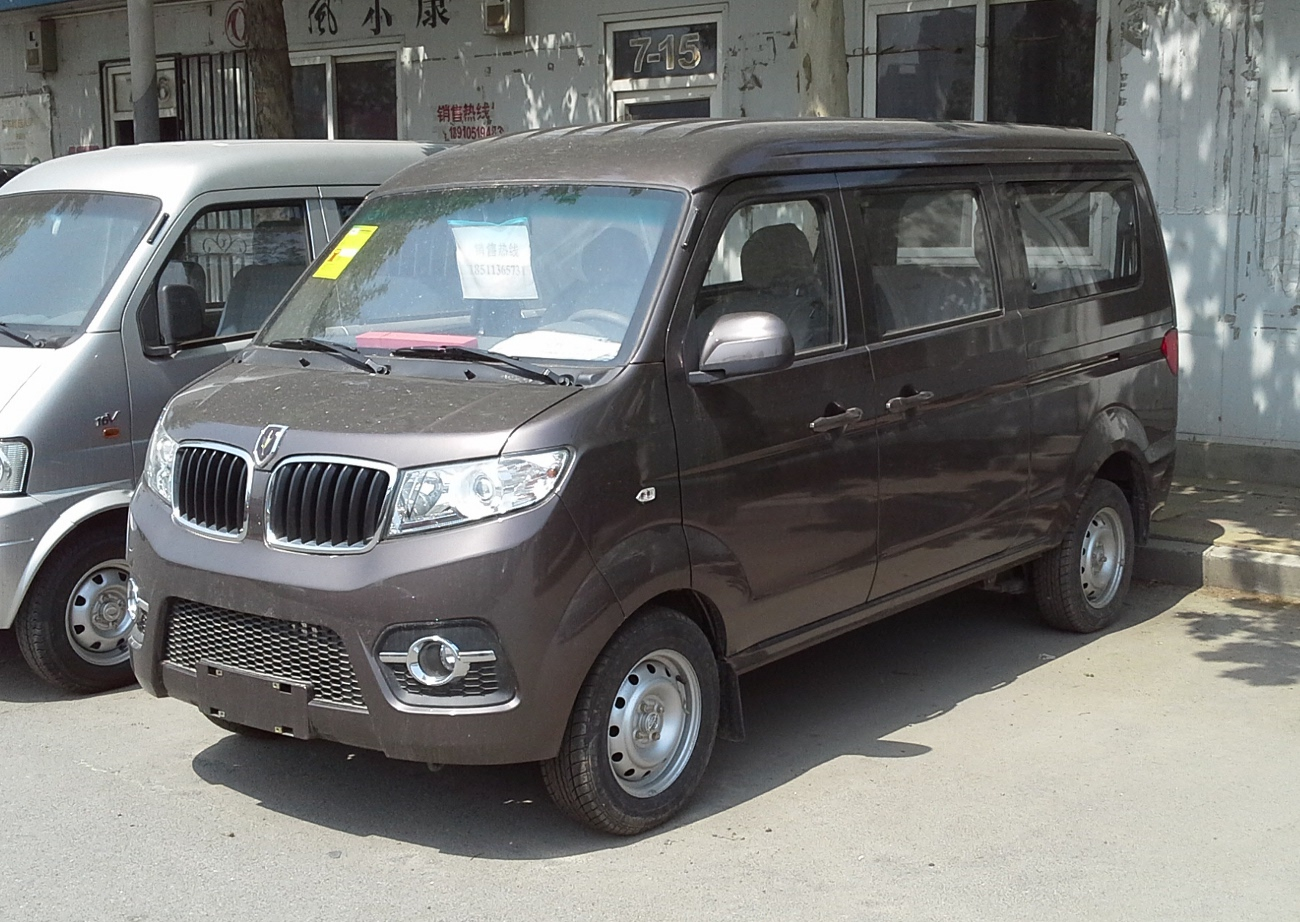
Jinbei Haixing X30

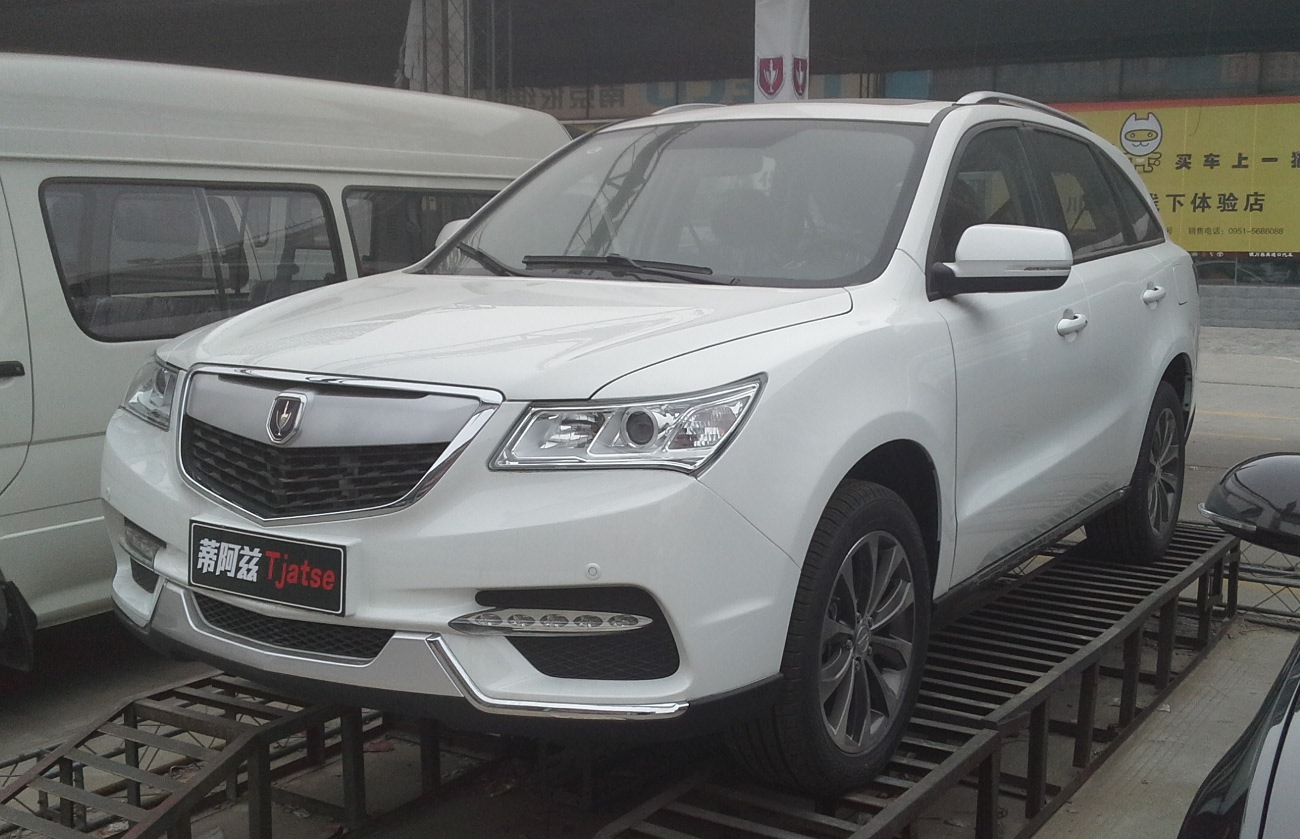
Jinbei Tjatse S70

== Operations ==
BMW-branded autos are made at a production base in the Northeastern Chinese city of Shenyang completed in 2004, and ongoing construction saw this base increase its production capacity to 200,000 units/year by 2012.

An engine-making production base is located in Mianyang, Sichuan province.

== Sales ==
A total of 188,143 Brilliance marque vehicles were sold in China in 2013, making it the 25th largest-selling car brand in the country in that year (and the 10th largest-selling Chinese brand).

=== European exports ===
In 2007, Brilliance's BS6 sedan performed poorly in a crash test conducted by Germany's ADAC, receiving only one out of five possible stars in the Euro NCAP rating. Brilliance then redesigned the car, changing at least sixty components, and it saw a three-star performance in a crash test performed by Spain's Idiada. However, the price also rose considerably, and the importer (HSO Motors) went bankrupt in November 2009. Brilliance then tried to go it alone, but with high pricing and considerable market reluctance after the well-publicized crash test failures, exports to Europe were ended in April 2010 with no immediate plans for resumption.

=== SAIPA ===
In 2015, Brilliance announced it had started joint production with SAIPA of Iran, to produce the H300 and H200 models, under the local brand name of Saipa.
