= Brilliance BC3 =

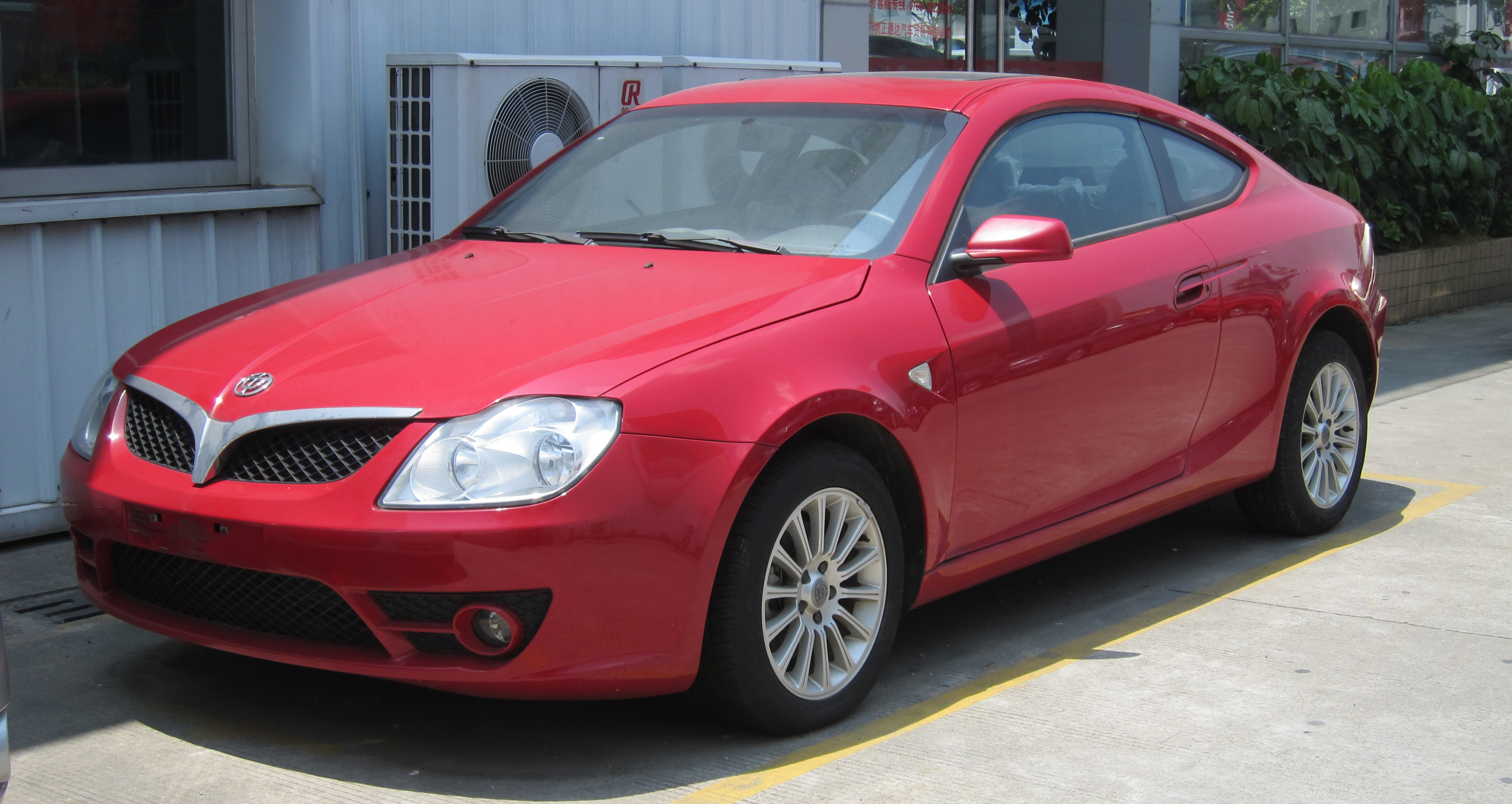

Overview
- Manufacturer: Brilliance Auto
- Also called: Brilliance M3; Brilliance Kouper; Zhonghua Coupe; Brilliance BC3 GT (Prototype)
- Production: 2007–2011
- Assembly: Shenyang, Liaoning, China; 6th of October City, Egypt (BAG), Stuttgart, Germany.
- Designer: Pininfarina

Body and chassis
- Class: Sports car (S)
- Body style: 3-door coupé
- Layout: Front-engine, front-wheel-drive

Powertrain
- Engine: 1.8 L BL18T turbo I4; 1.8 L 4G93 I4
- Transmission: 6 speed manual 5 speed manual 4 speed automatic

Dimensions
- Wheelbase: 2,600 mm (102.4 in)
- Length: 4,488 mm (176.7 in)
- Width: 1,812 mm (71.3 in)
- Height: 1,385 mm (54.5 in)
- Curb weight: 1,131 kg (2,493 lb)

Chronology
- Predecessor: Brilliance Coupe Concept
- Successor: None

The Brilliance BC3 is a sports car produced by the joint venture of Brilliance Auto, Mitsubishi Motors, Porsche AG and BMW Group.

== Overview ==
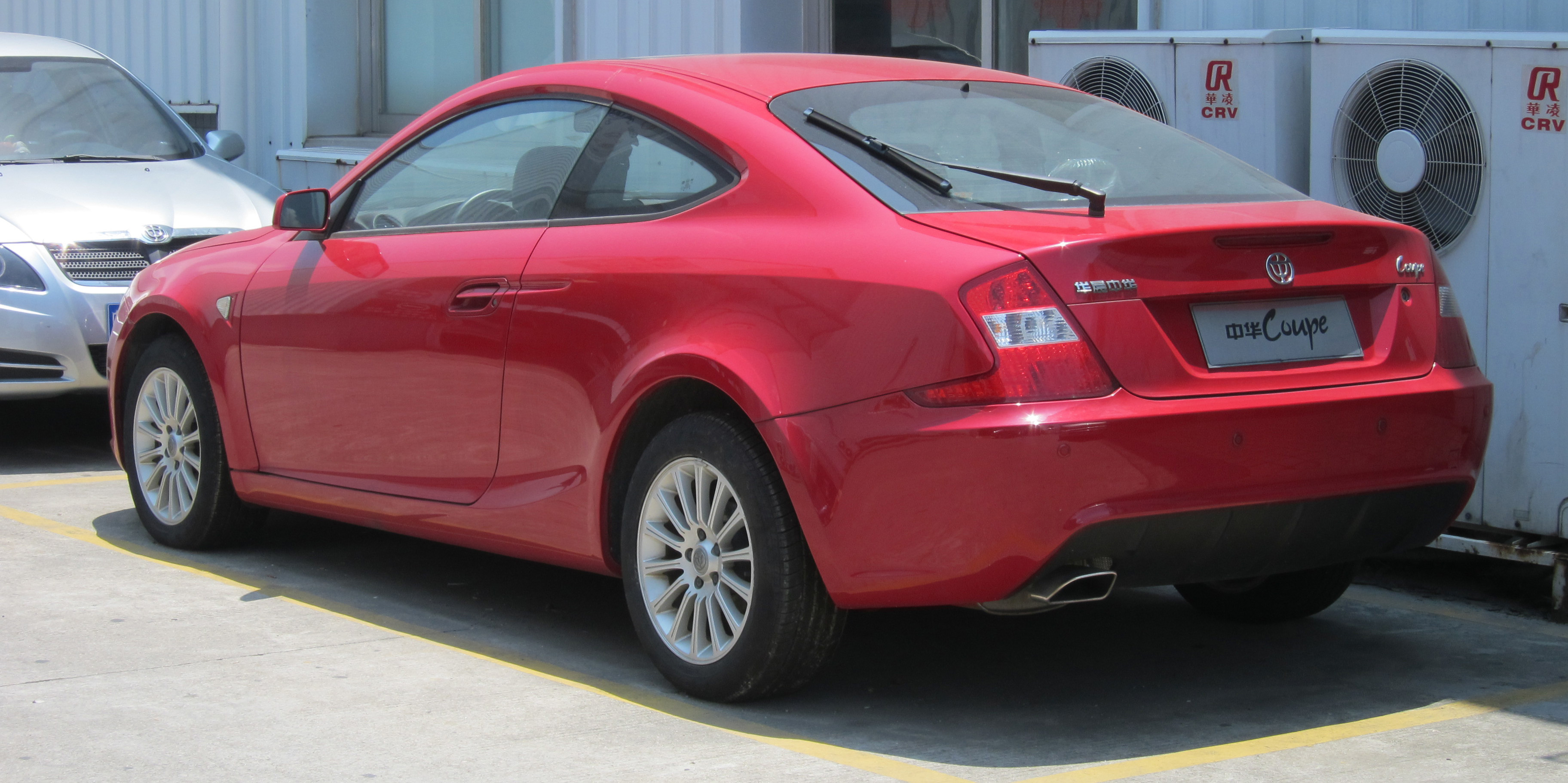
Brilliance Auto Coupe rear

It was originally announced at the Beijing Auto Show in 2006 as the Brilliance Zhonghua M3 then at the Geneva Motor Show in 2007 as the BC3 prototype, the Paris Motor Show in 2008 as the Zhonghua Coupe and at the 2009 Detroit Auto Show as the Brilliance M3.

The BC3 was designed by Pininfarina, the chassis was developed with assistance from Porsche Engineering and the engine developed with FEV Inc.

Despite the BC3 touring around international motor shows including Geneva, Paris and Detroit, the car was not widely exported. It was sold in Egypt as the Brilliance Kouper, in China as the Brilliance M3 and Germany as the "BC3 GT".

== Specifications ==
The BC3 is powered by a Mitsubishi designed 1.8L Turbocharged 4-cylinder petrol engine, producing 126 kW (171 PS; 169 bhp) and torque of 238 N⋅m (176 lb⋅ft), resulting in a top speed of 212 km/h (131.7 mph).
