= H320 =

H320 can refer to:

- H.320, a suite of video conferencing protocols
- H.320 - America's Affordable Health Choices Act of 2009
- IRiver H320, a member of the H300 series of media players
- Brilliance H320, compact car produced by Brilliance Auto
