= Brilliance H3 =

Chinese automobile

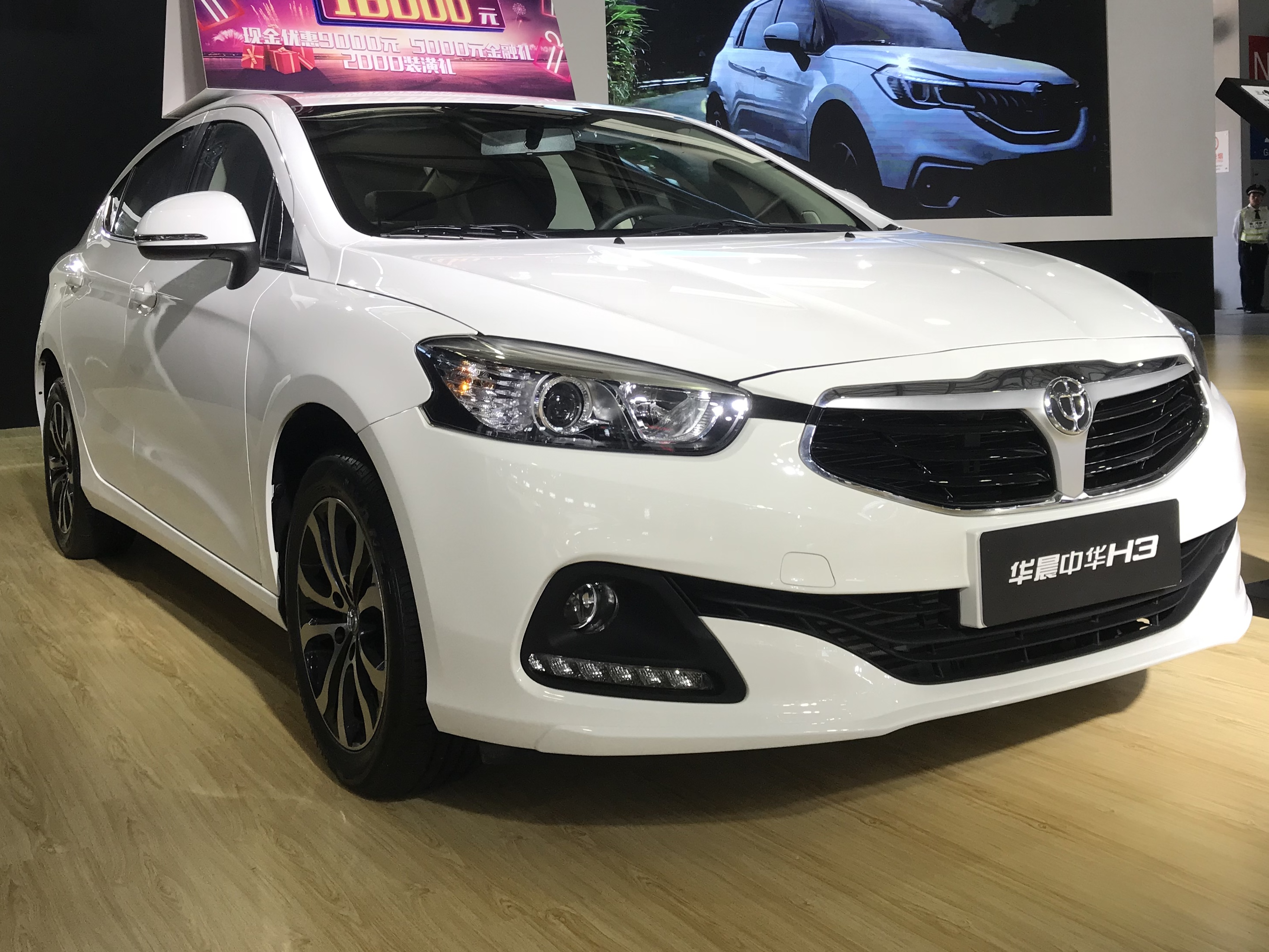

Overview
- Manufacturer: Brilliance Auto
- Also called: Brilliance F20
- Production: 2016–2020
- Assembly: Shenyang, Liaoning, China; 6th of October City, Egypt (BAG)

Body and chassis
- Class: Compact (C)
- Body style: 4 door sedan
- Layout: Front-engine, front-wheel-drive

Powertrain
- Engine: 1.5 L BM15L I4 (petrol); 1.5 L turbo I4 (petrol)
- Transmission: 5-speed manual; 4 speed automatic

Dimensions
- Wheelbase: 2,660 mm (104.7 in)
- Length: 4,640 mm (182.7 in)
- Width: 1,790 mm (70.5 in)
- Height: 1,445 mm (56.9 in)

Chronology
- Predecessor: Brilliance H330; Brilliance H320

The Brilliance H3 sedan is a compact car produced by Brilliance Auto aimed to replace the Brilliance H330 series.

== Overview ==
The engine options for the Brilliance H3 includes a 1.5-liter engine producing 112 horsepower (84 kW) and a 1.5-liter turbo producing 150 horsepower (110 kW) and 220 N·m. The engines are mated to either a 5-speed manual or 5-speed automatic gearbox. The 0–100 km/h (0–62 mph) acceleration time is 10.11 seconds.

Prices of the Brilliance H3 compact sedan ranges from 63,900 to 88,900 yuan.

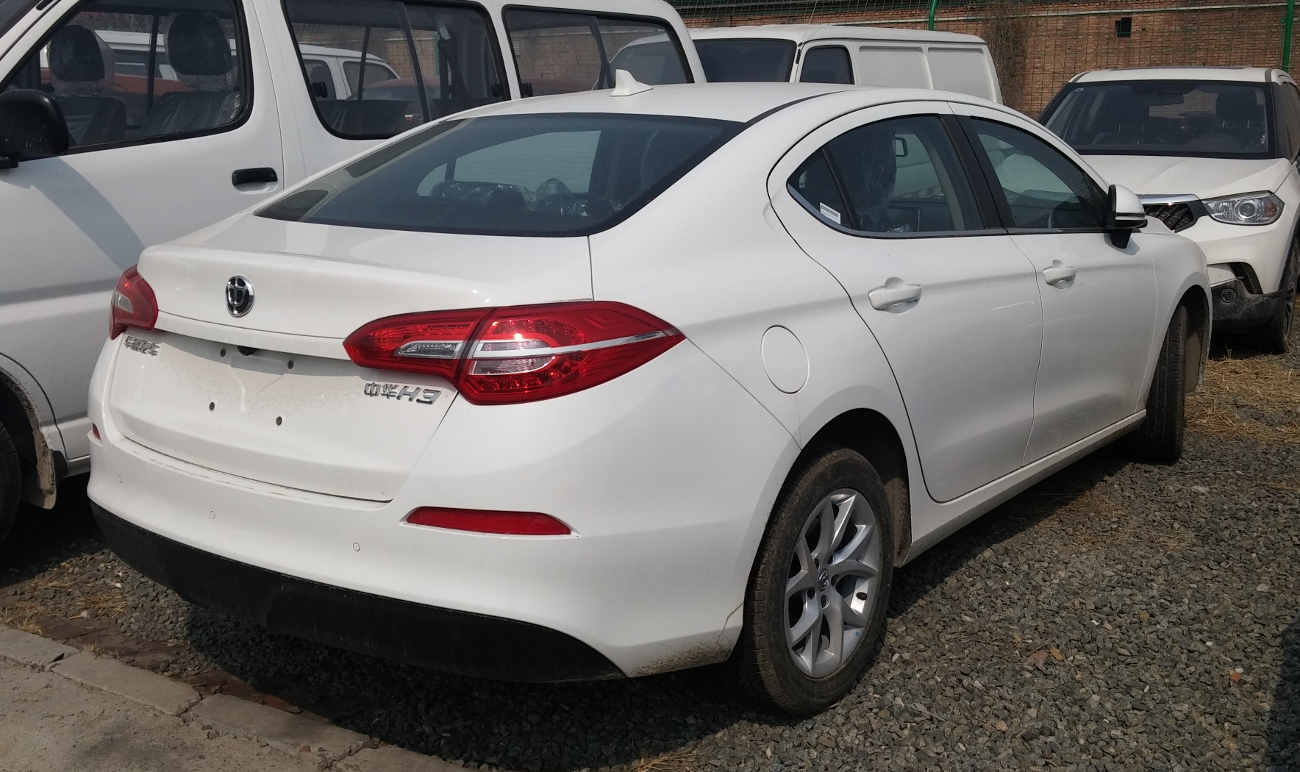
Brilliance H3 rear
