= Brilliance H330 =

Chinese automobile

Brilliance H320/H330
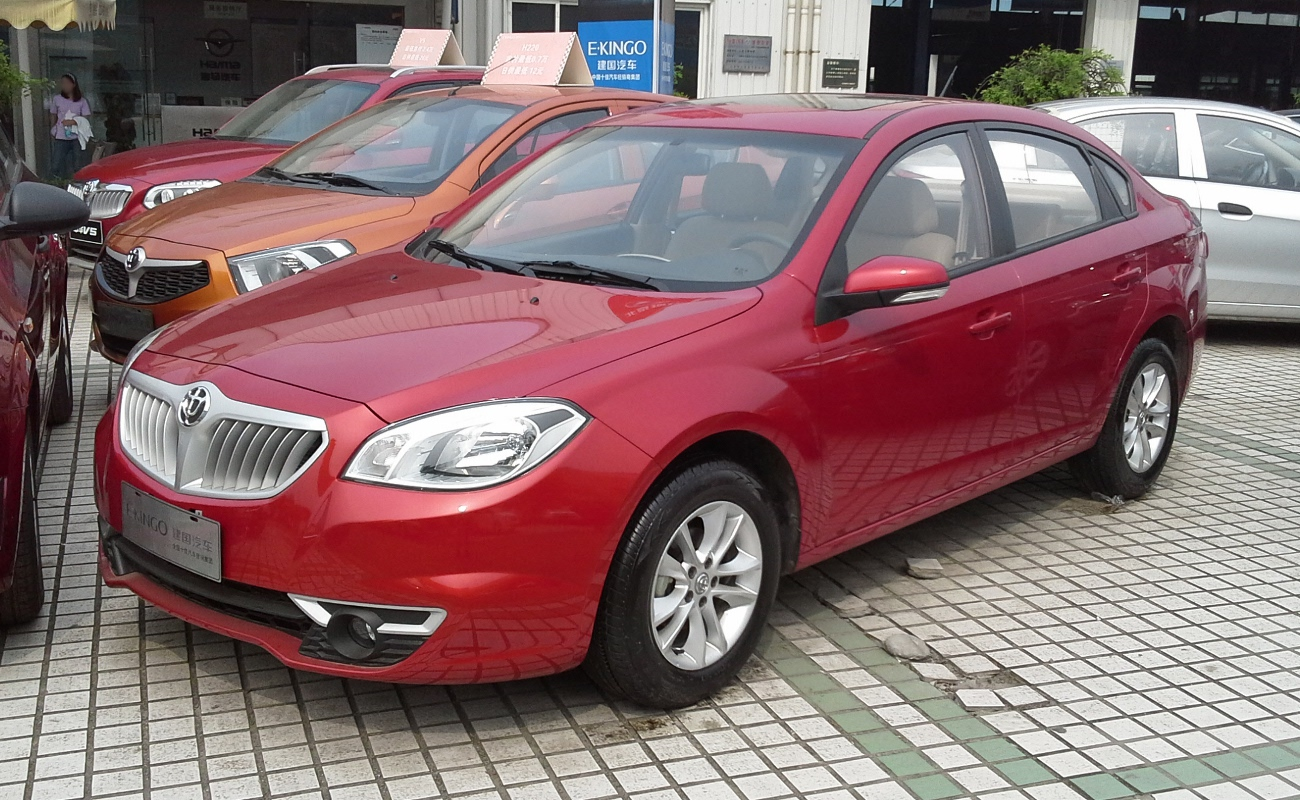

Overview
- Manufacturer: Brilliance Auto
- Also called: Brilliance H320 (hatchback); Brilliance C3 Cross (Crossover); Pars Khodro H330 (Iran); Pyeonghwa Hwiparam 1518 (North Korea)
- Production: 2013–2016; 2015–2020 (Iran); 2018–2020 (C3 Cross)
- Assembly: Shenyang, Liaoning, China; 6th of October City, Egypt (BAG)

Body and chassis
- Class: Compact (C)
- Body style: 4 door sedan 5-door hatchback
- Layout: Front-engine, front-wheel-drive
- Related: Brilliance FSV (sedan); Brilliance FRV (hatchback)

Powertrain
- Engine: 1.5 L BM15L I4 (petrol); 1.65 L BM16BL I4 (petrol)
- Transmission: 5-speed manual 4 speed automatic

Dimensions
- Wheelbase: 2,580 mm (101.6 in)
- Length: 4,510 mm (177.6 in) (sedan); 4,210 mm (165.7 in) (hatchback)
- Width: 1,755 mm (69.1 in) (sedan); 1,755 mm (69.1 in) (hatchback)
- Height: 1,460 mm (57.5 in)

Chronology
- Predecessor: Brilliance BS2 (FSV/FRV)
- Successor: Brilliance H3

The Brilliance H330 sedan and Brilliance H320 hatchback duo are compact cars (C) produced by Brilliance Auto aimed to replace the Brilliance BS2 series.

== Brilliance H330 ==
The Brilliance H330 sedan was launched on the Chinese car market in April 2013. Pricing ranges from 65,800 yuan to 75,800 yuan. The Brilliance H330 sedan is the successor of the Brilliance Junjie FSV sedan, and it is actually a heavy facelift based on the FSV sedan.

== Brilliance H320 ==
The Brilliance H320 hatchback debuted at the 2012 Chengdu Auto Show. Pricing starts from 63,800 yuan to 78,800 yuan. The Brilliance H320 hatchback is the successor of the Brilliance Junjie FRV.

== Gallery ==
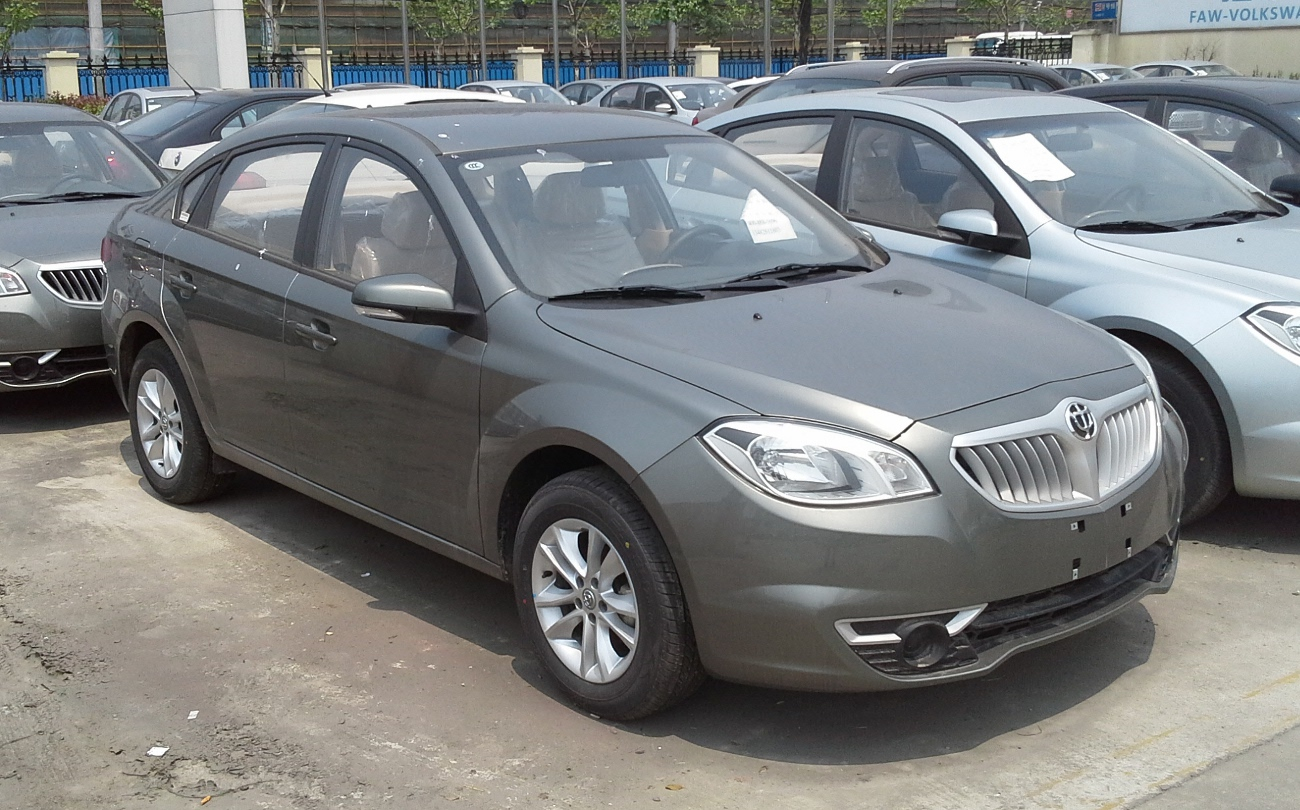
Brilliance H330 front

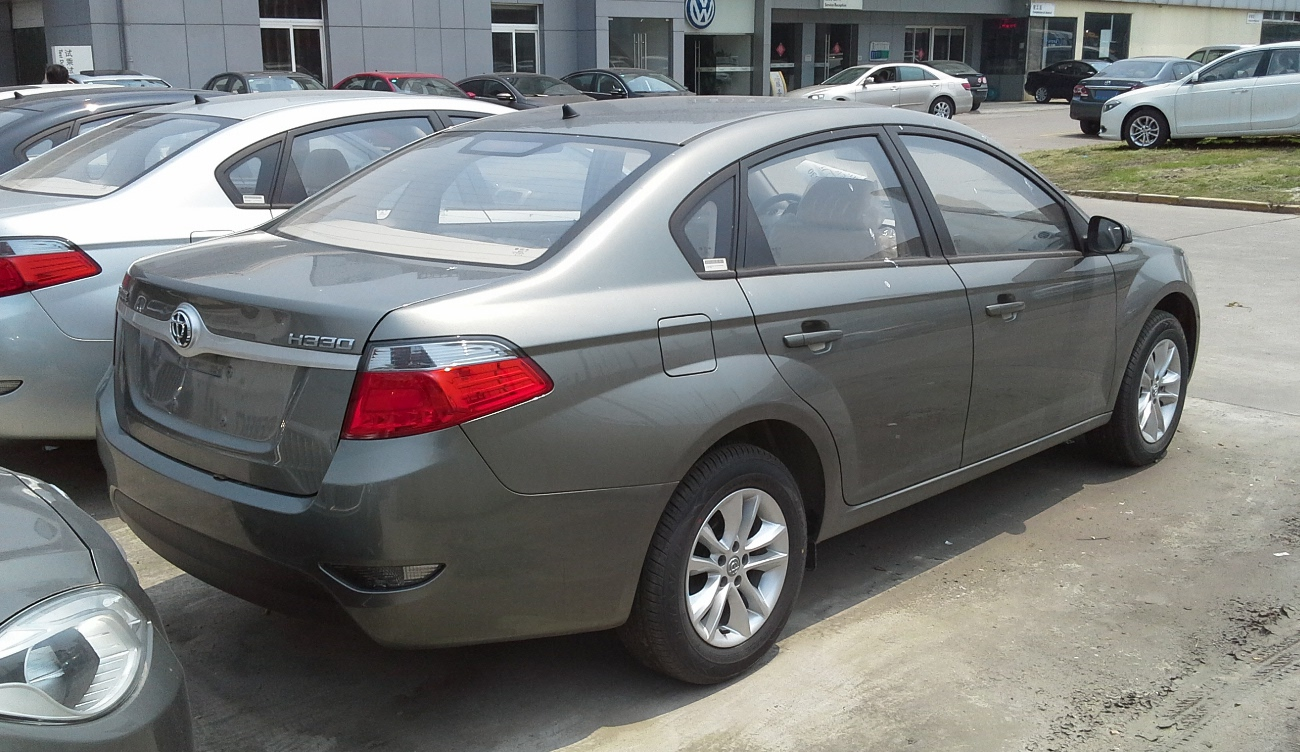
Brilliance H330 rear

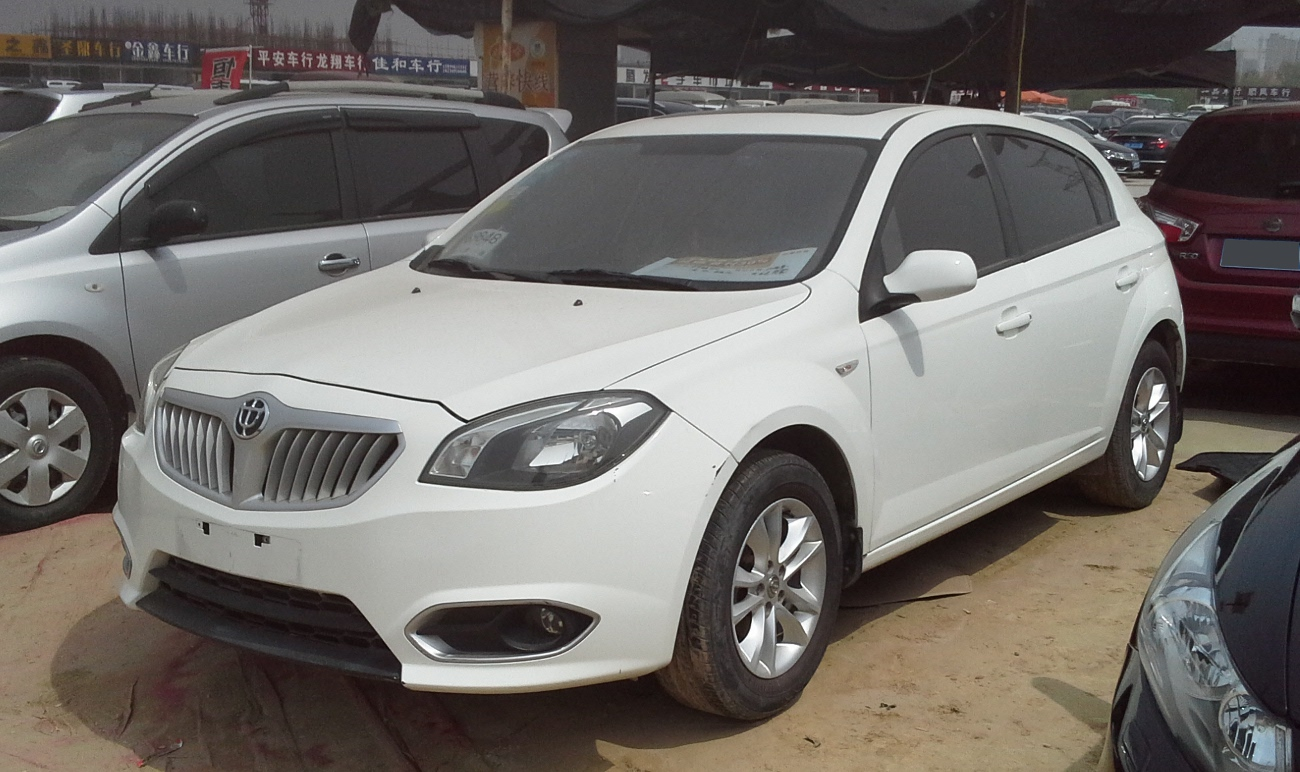
Brilliance H320 front
