= Brilliance BS2 =

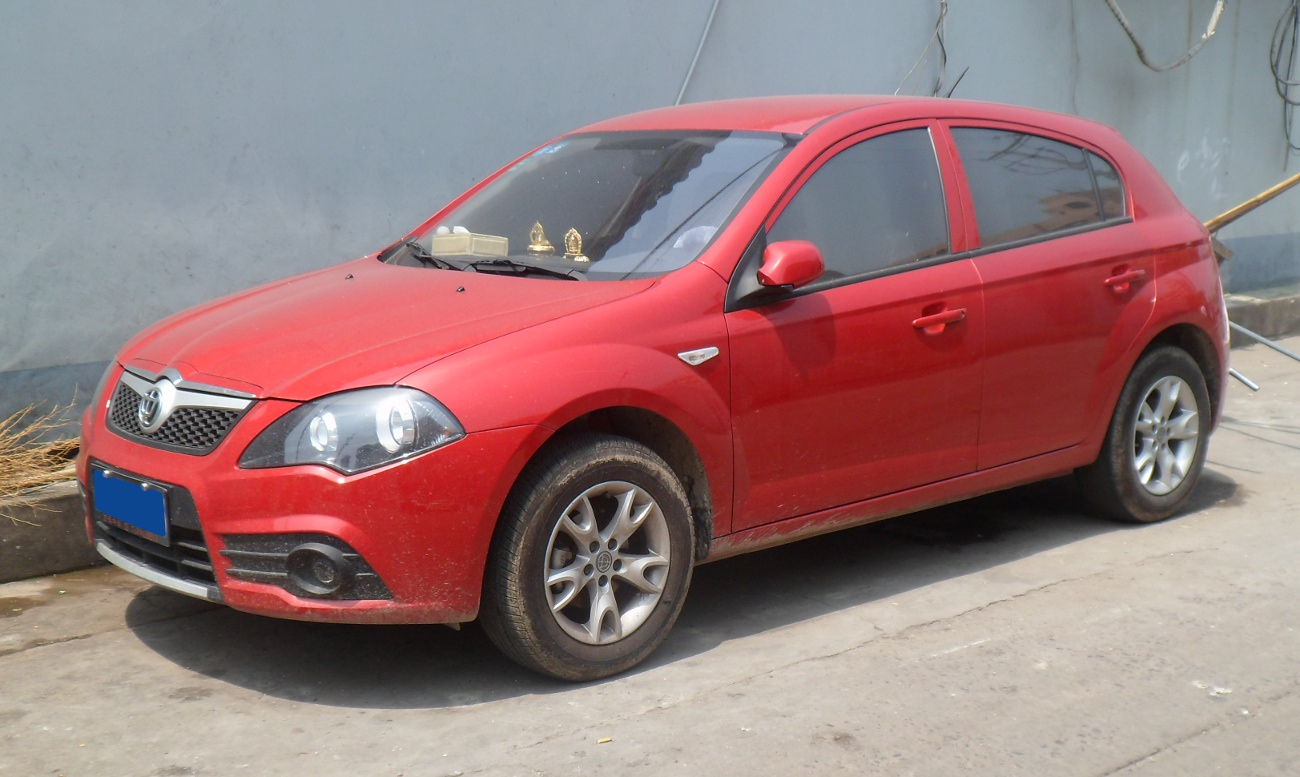

Overview
- Manufacturer: Brilliance Auto
- Also called: Brilliance FRV; Brilliance FSV (sedan); Brilliance Junjie FRV (China); Pyeonghwa Hwiparam 1504/Pyeonghwa Hwiparam III (North Korea) 中华骏捷 (Chinese translation)
- Production: 2008–2013
- Assembly: Shenyang, Liaoning, China; 6th of October City, Egypt (BAG)
- Designer: Italdesign Giugiaro

Body and chassis
- Class: compact car
- Body style: 4 door sedan 5-door hatchback
- Layout: Front-engine, front-wheel-drive

Powertrain
- Engine: 1.3 L 4G13 I4 (petrol) (hatchback only); 1.5 L 4A15 I4 (petrol); 1.5 L 4A91 I4 (petrol); 1.6 L 4G18 I4 (petrol)
- Transmission: 5-speed manual 4 speed automatic

Dimensions
- Wheelbase: 2,580 mm (101.6 in)
- Length: 4,510 mm (177.6 in) (sedan); 4,210 mm (165.7 in) (hatchback)
- Width: 1,758 mm (69.2 in) (sedan); 1,755 mm (69.1 in) (hatchback)
- Height: 1,460 mm (57.5 in)

Chronology
- Successor: Brilliance H320 Hatchback; Brilliance H330 Sedan

The Brilliance BS2, or FRV/FSV, is a car produced by the Brilliance Auto in the People's Republic of China.

== Overview ==
It was originally announced at the Frankfurt Motor Show in 2007 as a pre-production car and then at the Beijing Auto Show in 2008, and was given its European premiere at the 2009 Geneva Motor Show. Prior to its public launch, it was named Brilliance A1.

It was designed by Italdesign Giugiaro and developed in China as a 5-door small family hatchback to complement the larger Brilliance BS4 and BS6. A 4-door saloon version was also developed and is sold as the Brilliance FSV.

The FRV Cross is a crossover style variant with different trim but sharing the same mechanicals as the FRV and FSV.

The BS2 is not widely exported, and despite its display at Frankfurt and Geneva, the car was never launched in Europe due to the bad press received by the crash test results of the larger BS6 and Brilliance withdrew from European markets.

The BS2 received a facelift in 2010 with alterations to the front bumper and grille.

== Specifications ==
The BS2 was originally powered by a Mitsubishi 1.6 L 4-cylinder 16-valve petrol engine (Euro III), producing 101 bhp (75 kW; 102 PS). This engine was later replaced with a Euro IV rated 1.5 L engine of Brilliance's own design.

== Gallery ==
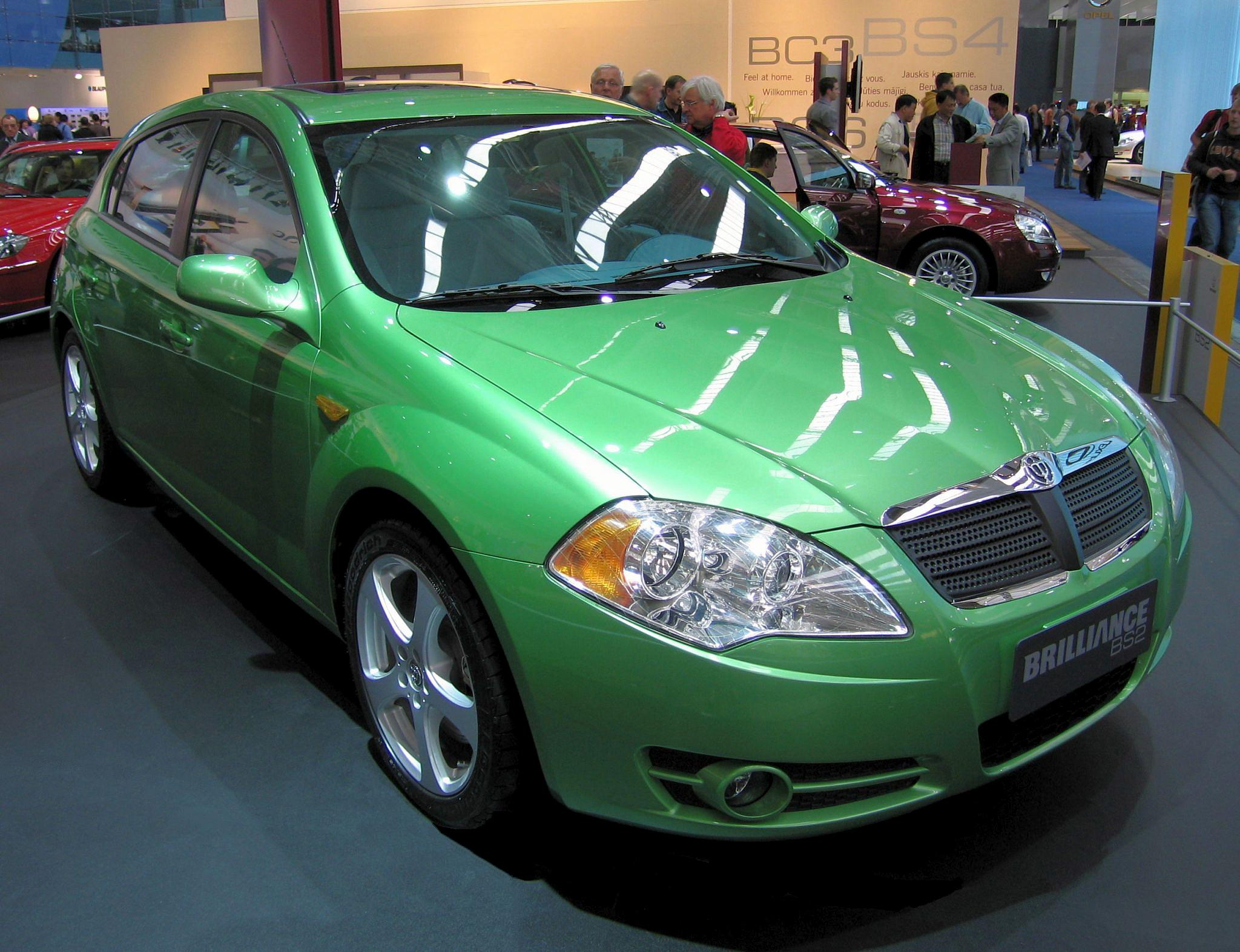
Brilliance BS2

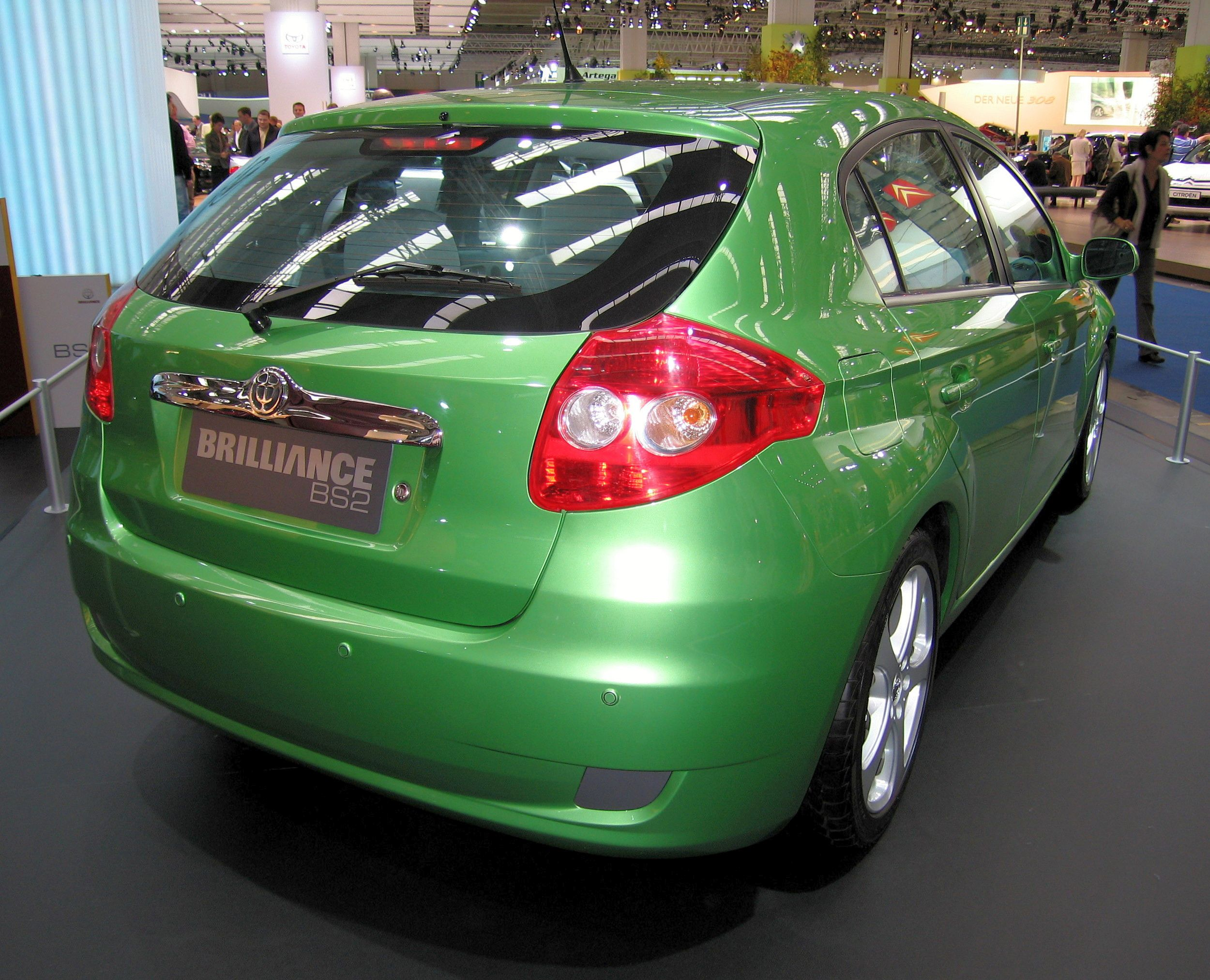
Brilliance BS2 rear

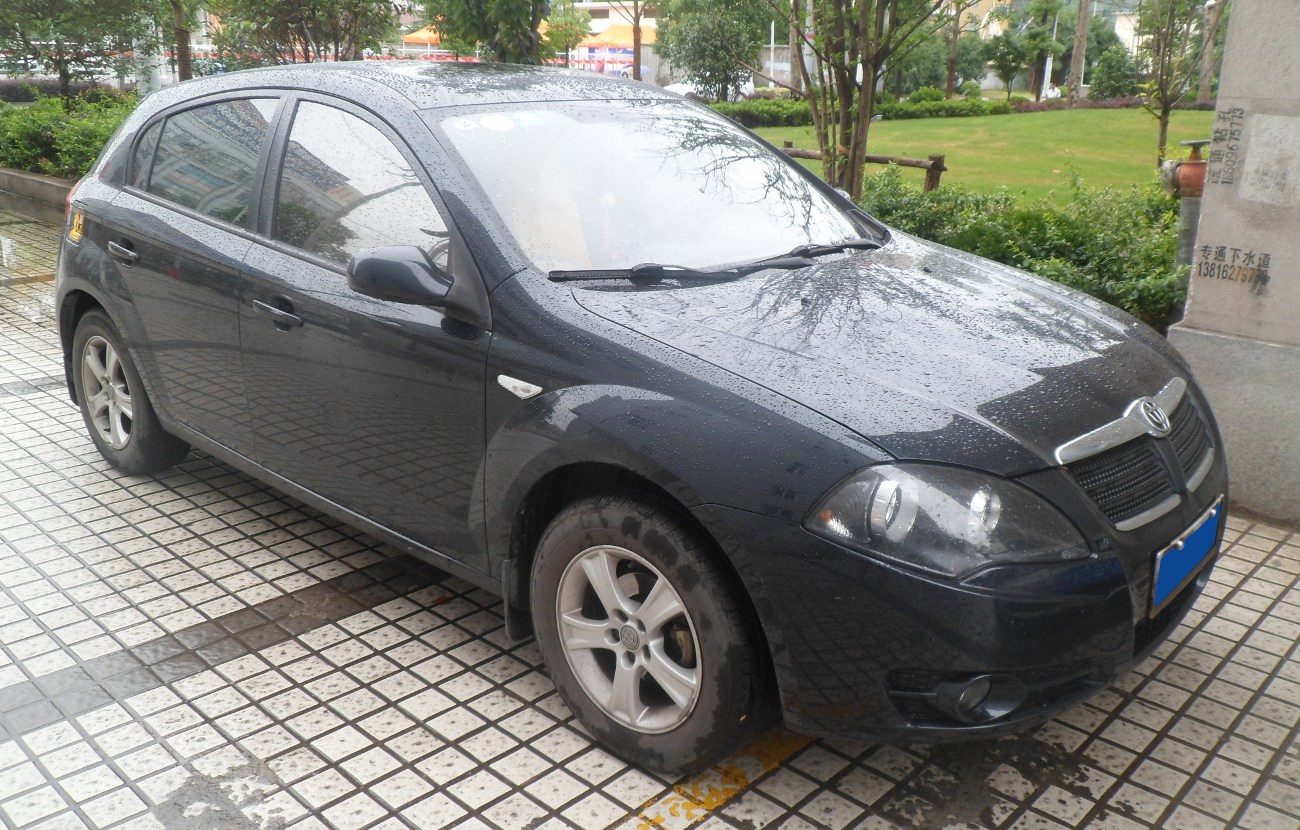
Brilliance Junjie FRV front

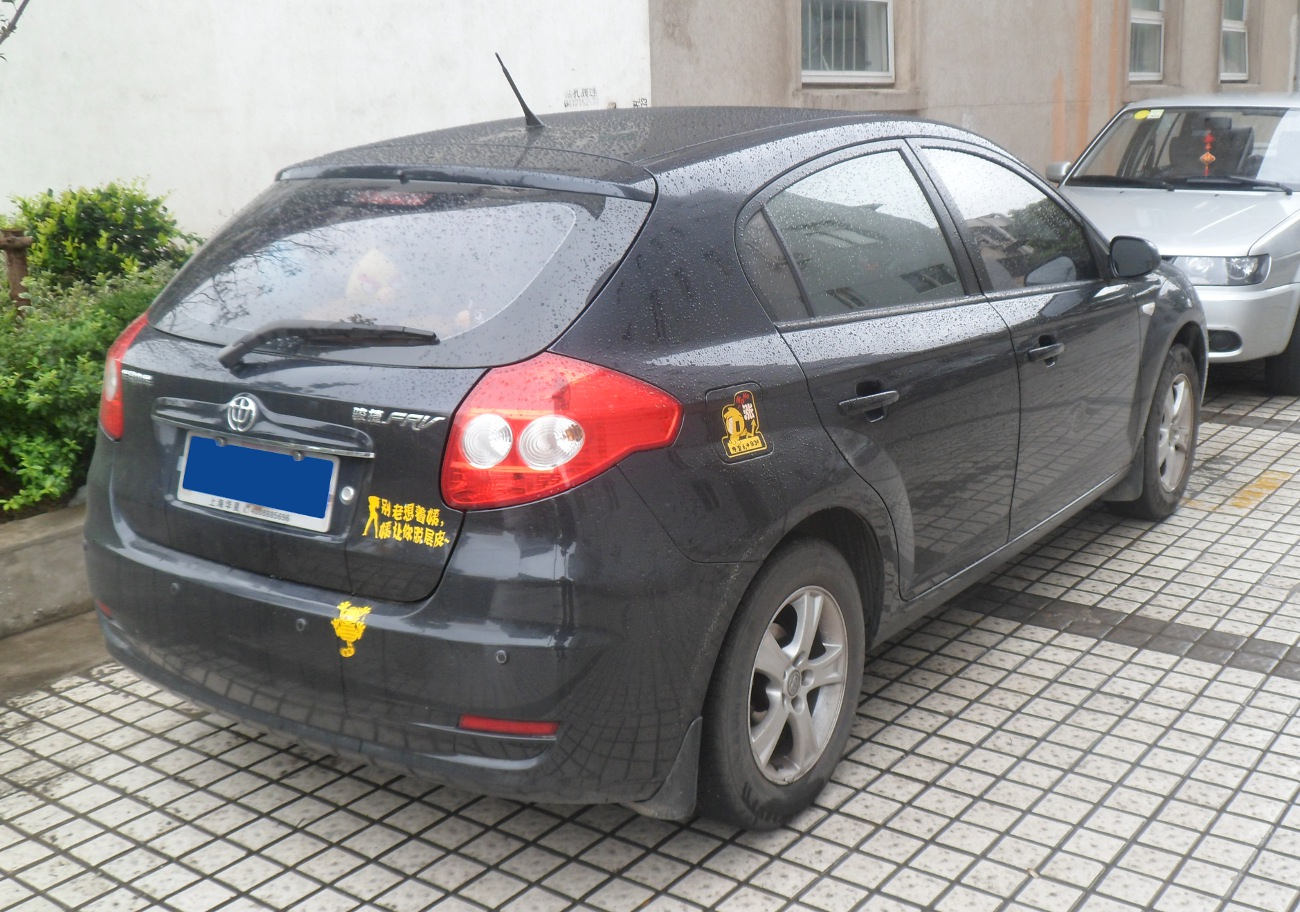
Brilliance Junjie FRV rear

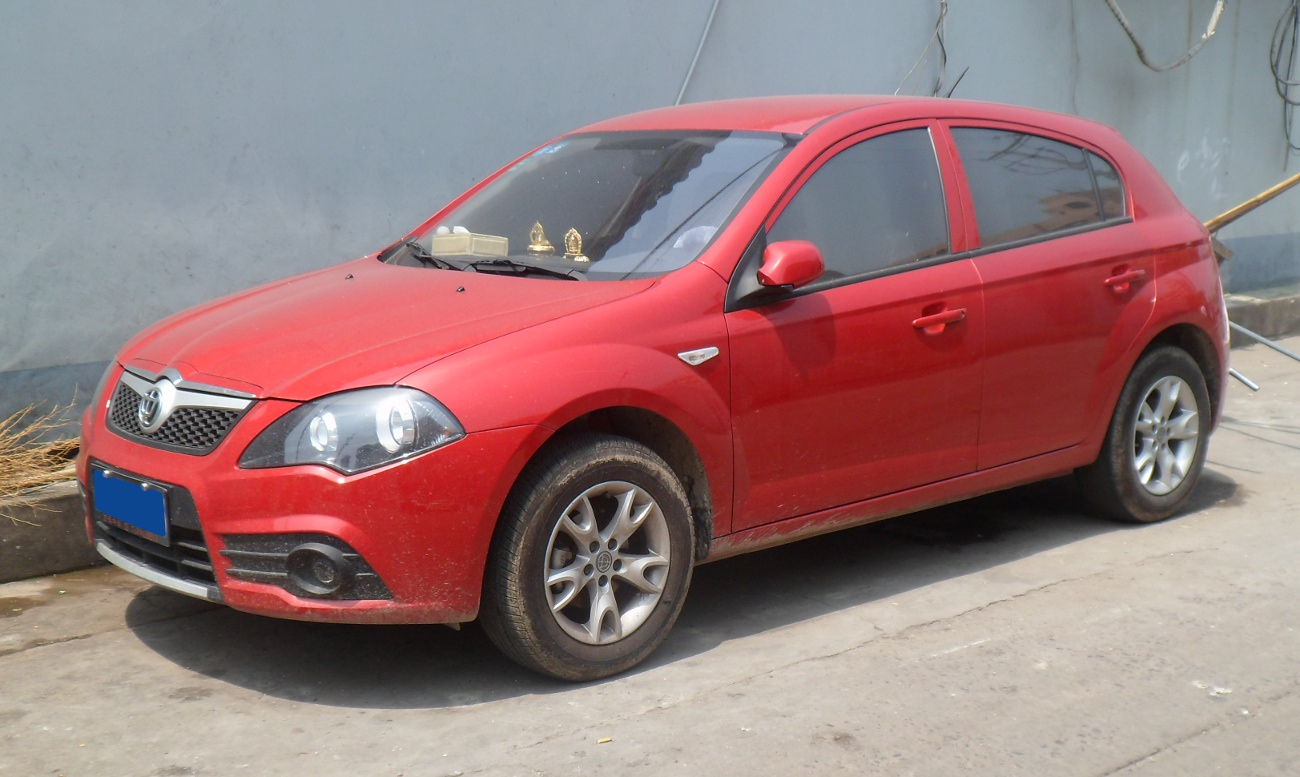
Brilliance Junjie FRV facelift front

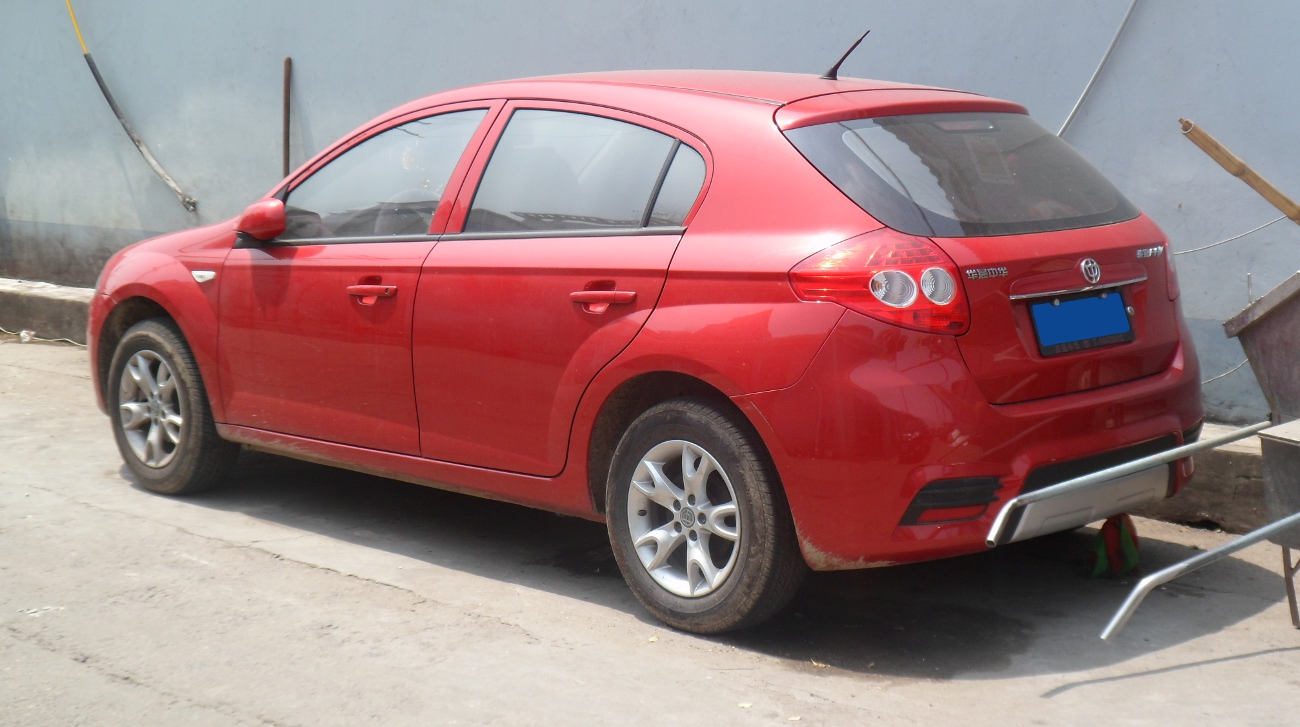
Brilliance Junjie FRV facelift rear

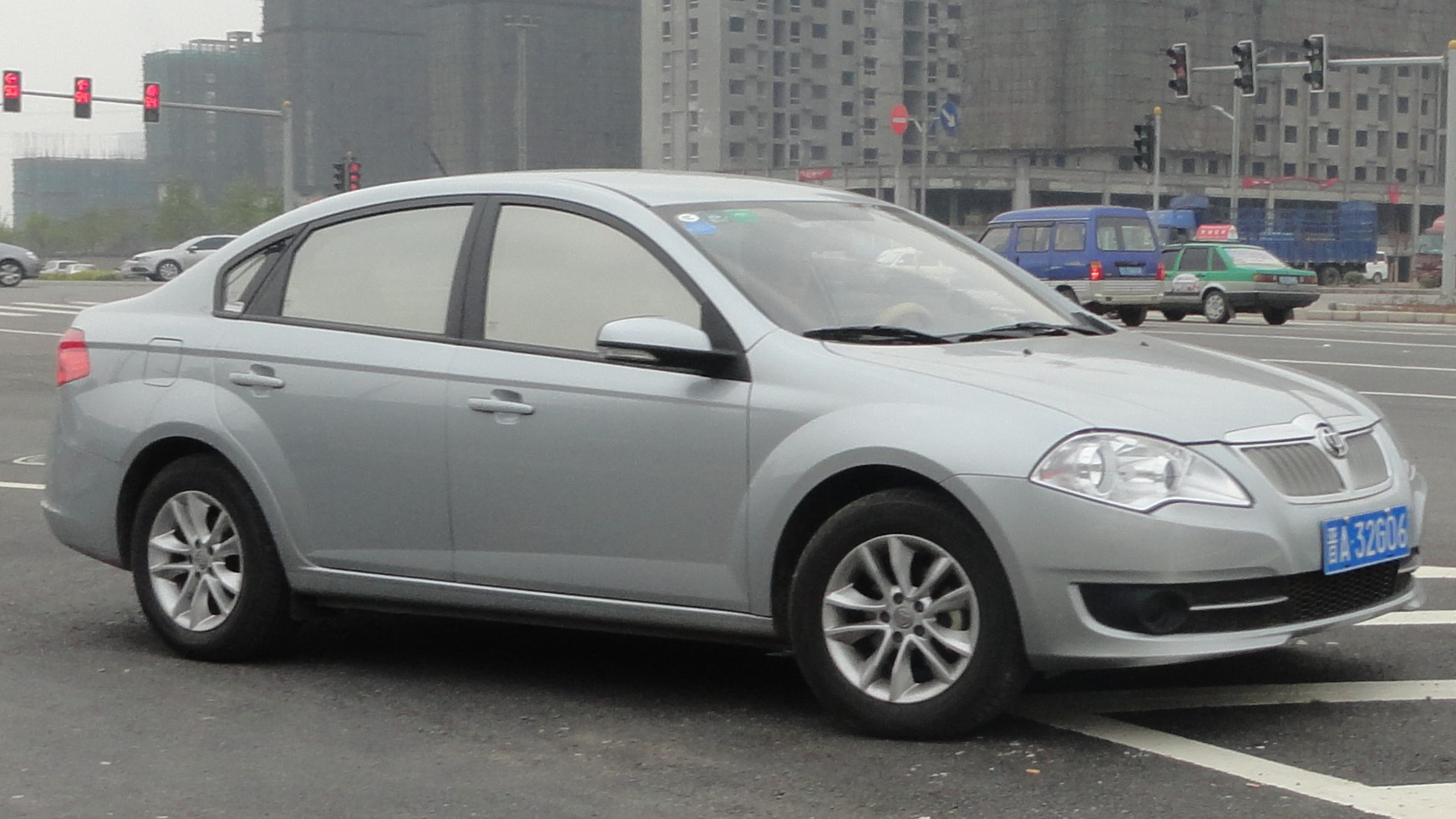
Brilliance FSV front

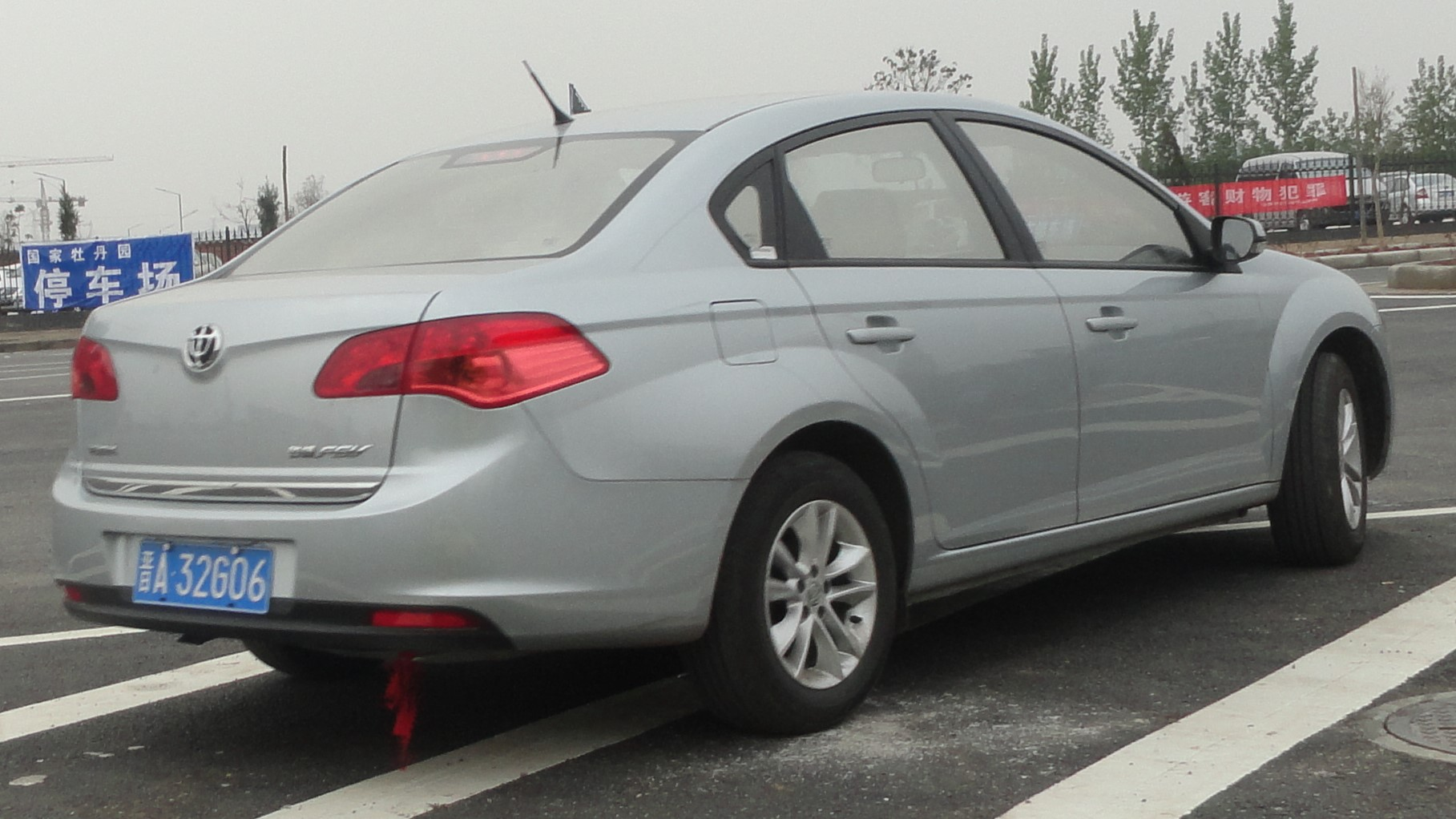
Brilliance FSV rear

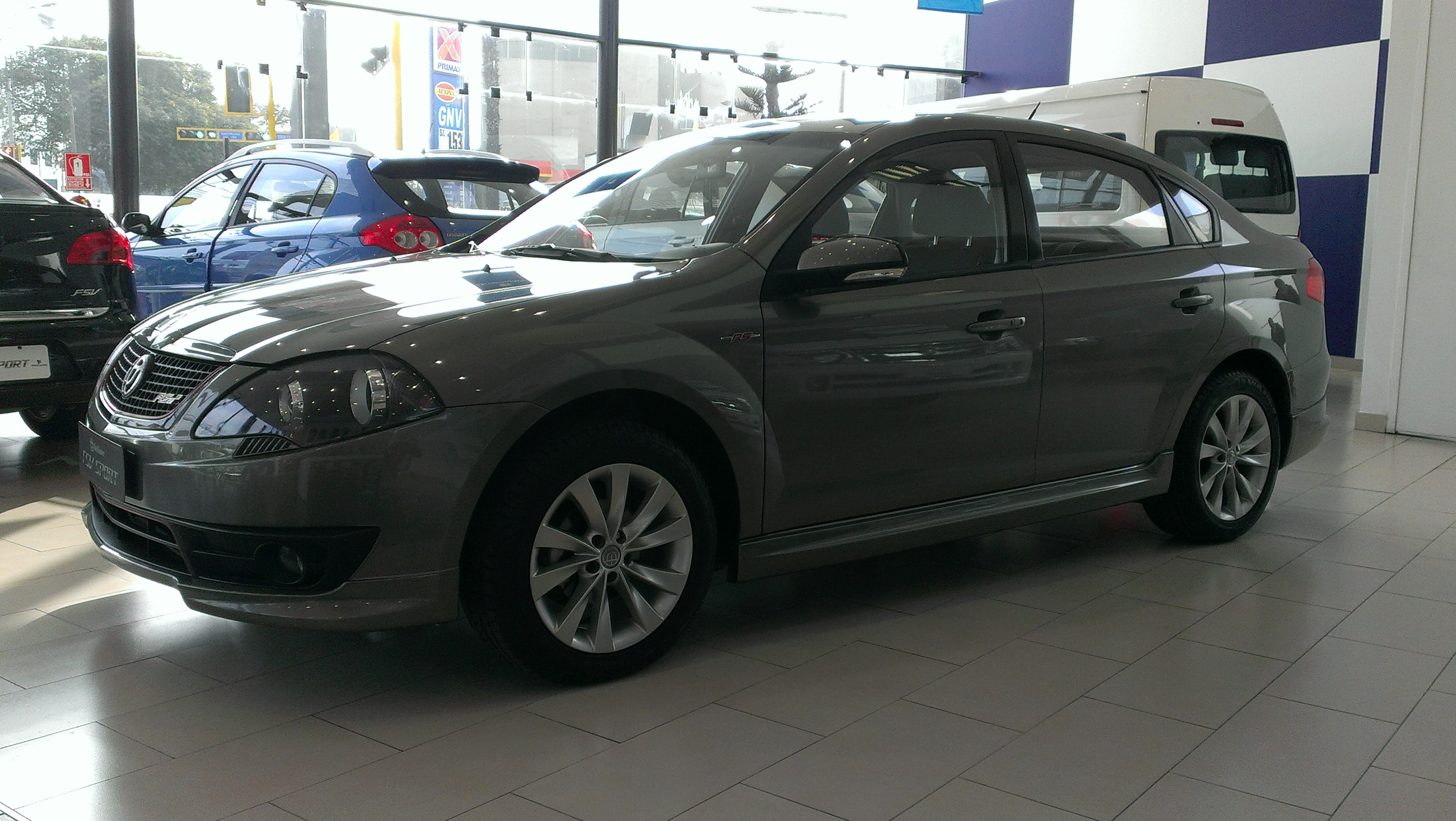
Brilliance FSV Sport front

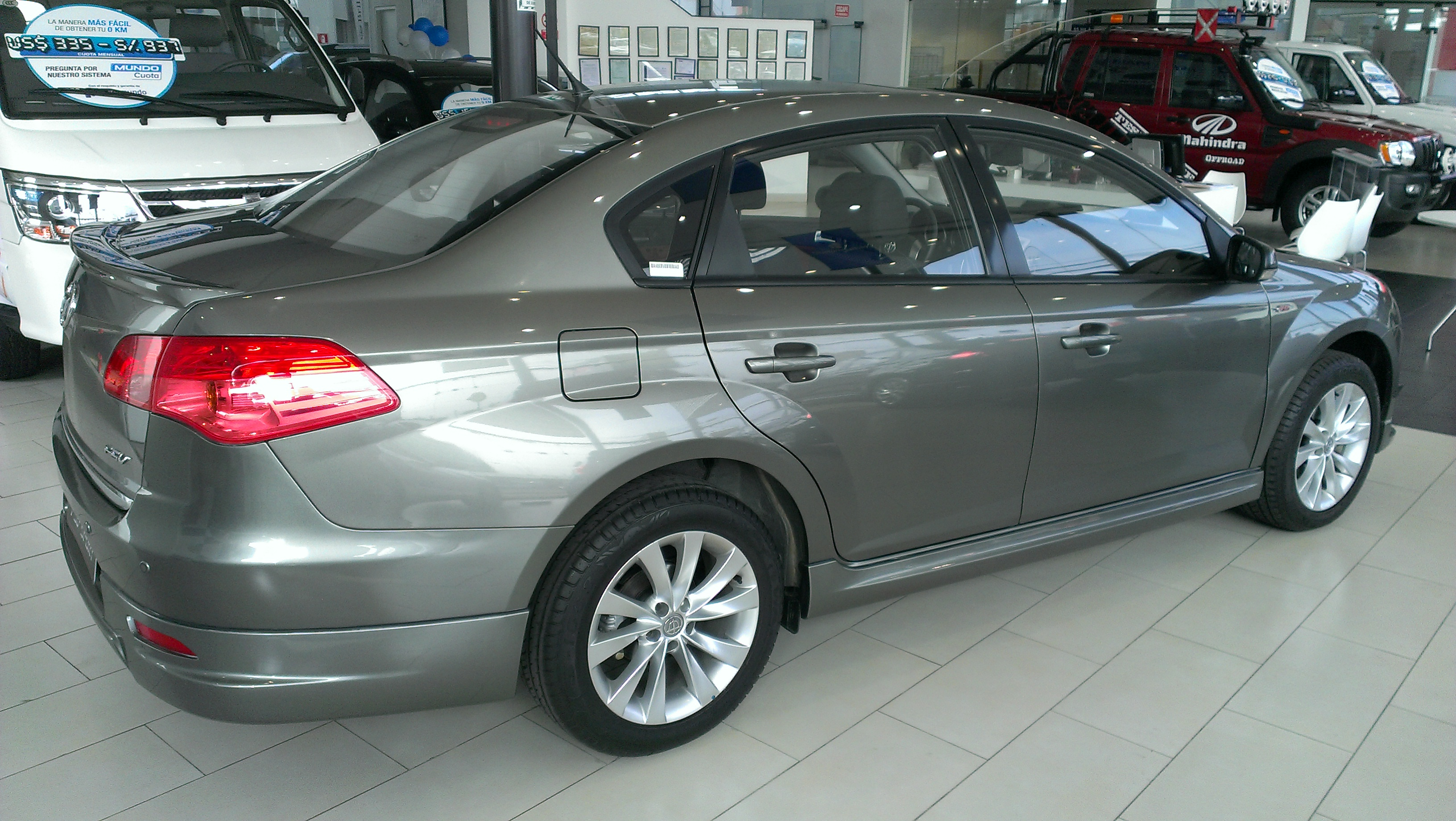
Brilliance FSV Sport rear

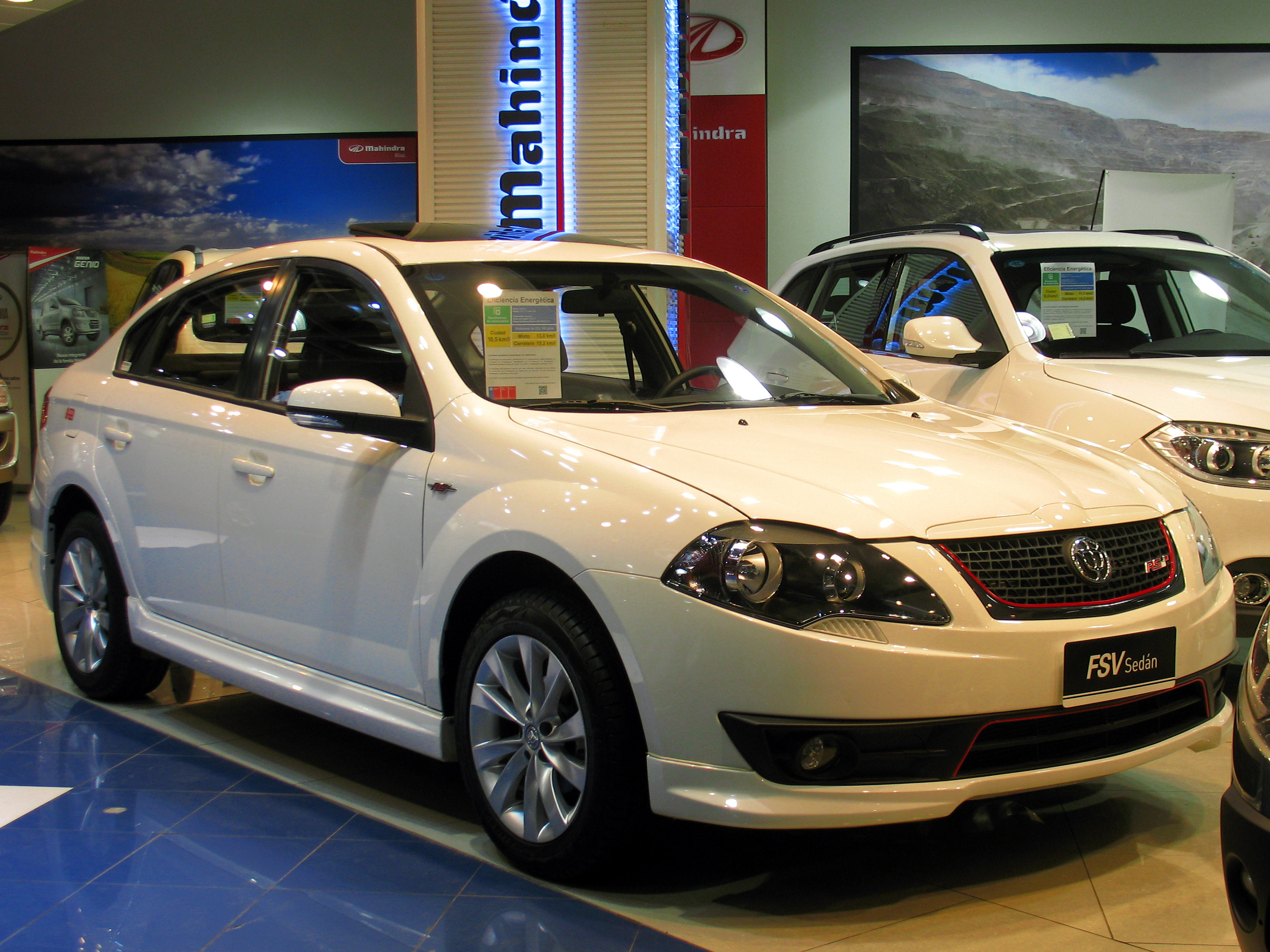
Brilliance FSV RS front

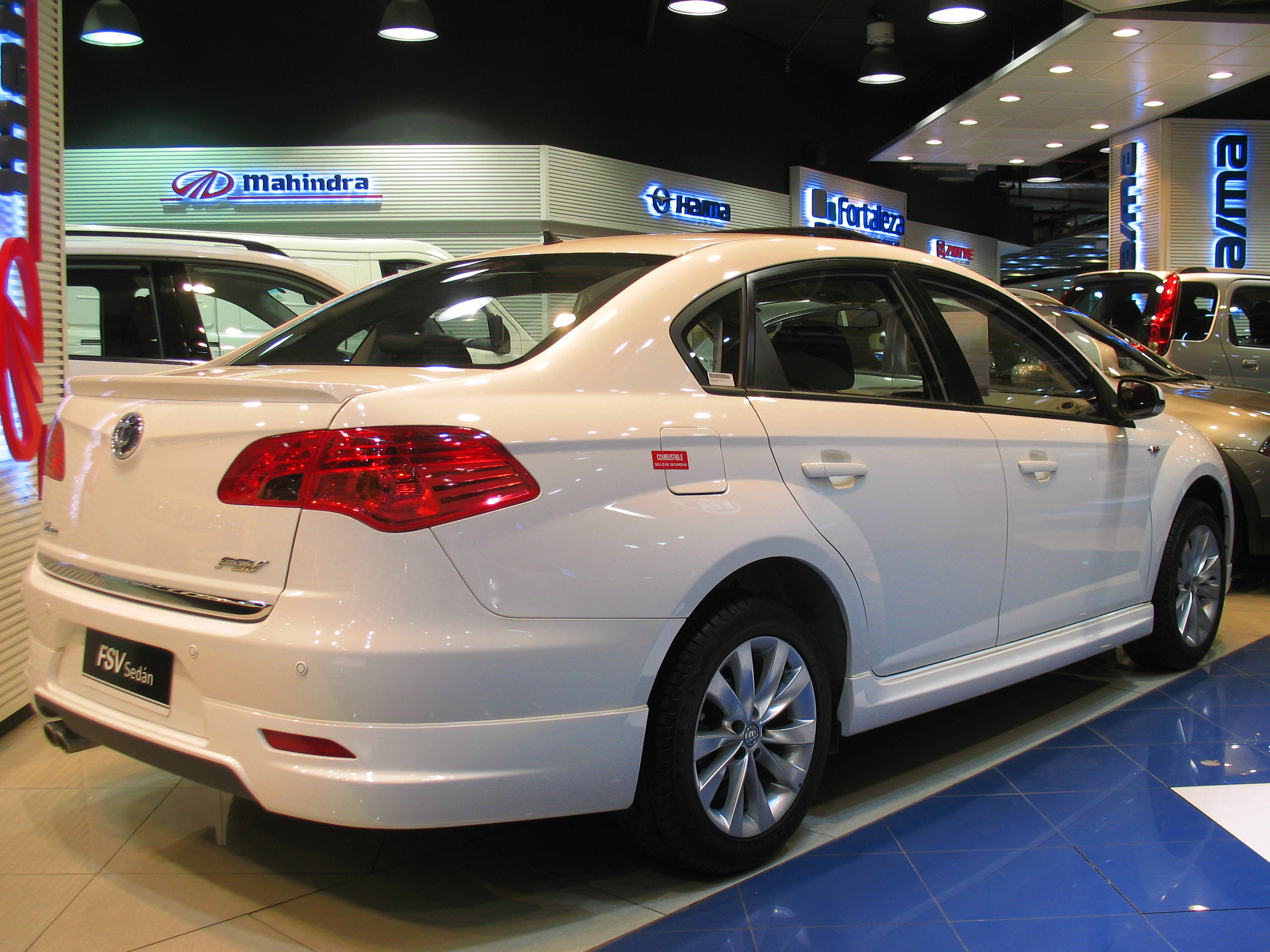
Brilliance FSV RS rear

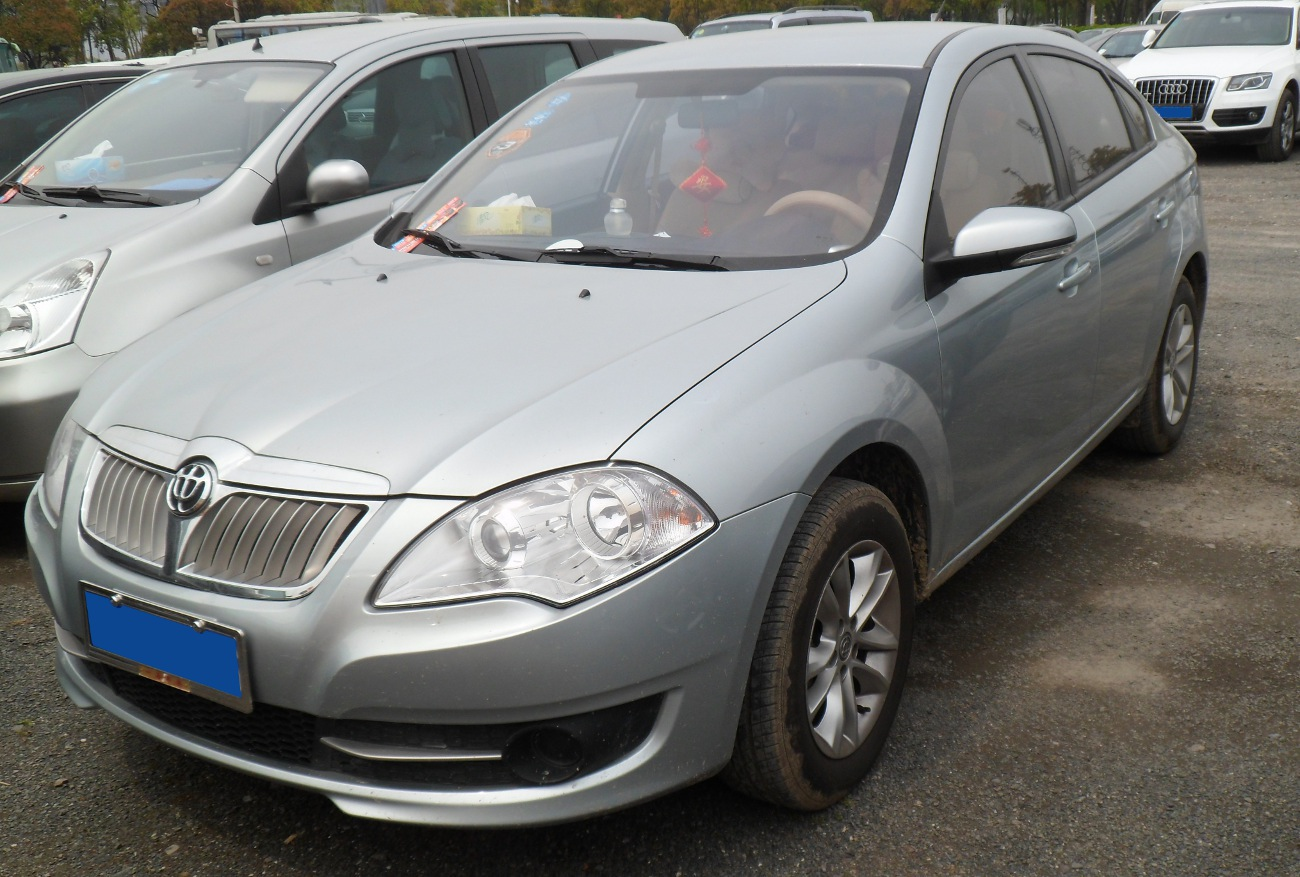
Brilliance Junjie FSV facelift front

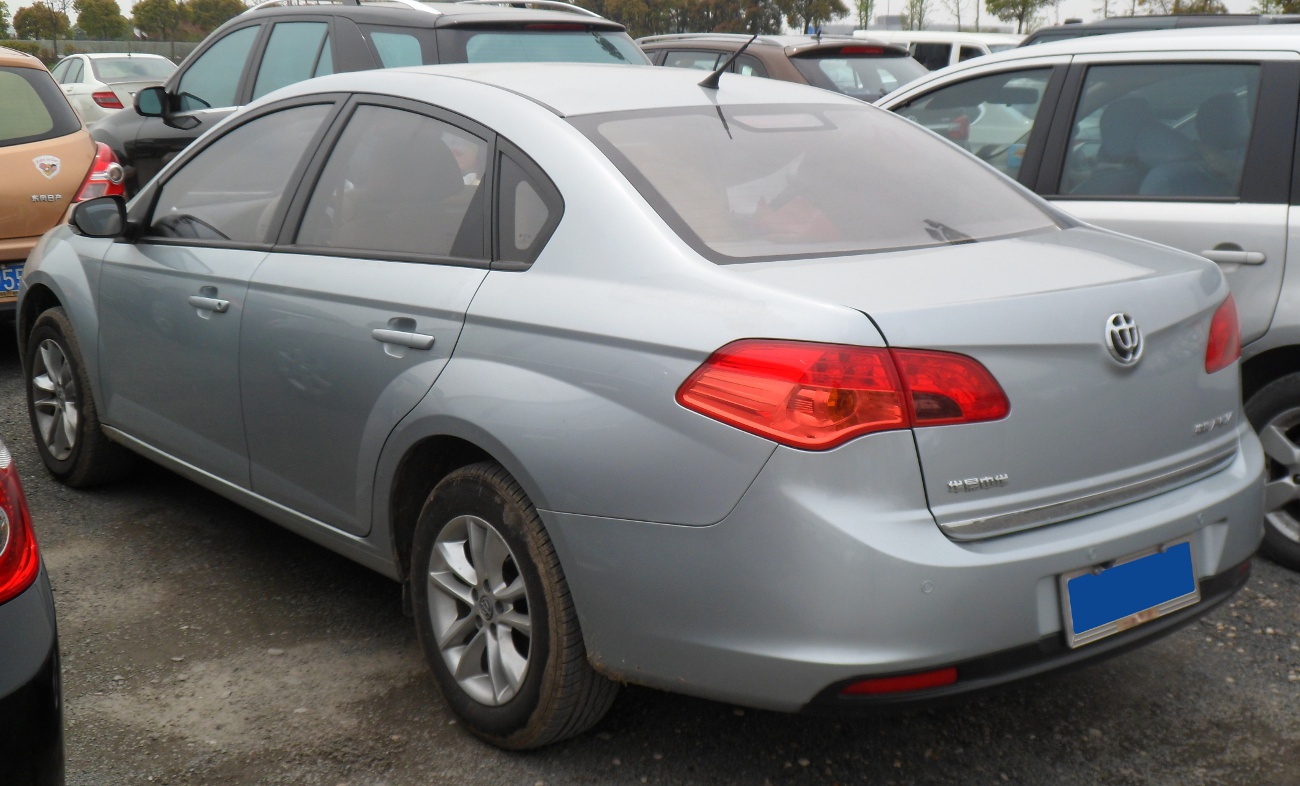
Brilliance Junjie FSV facelift rear

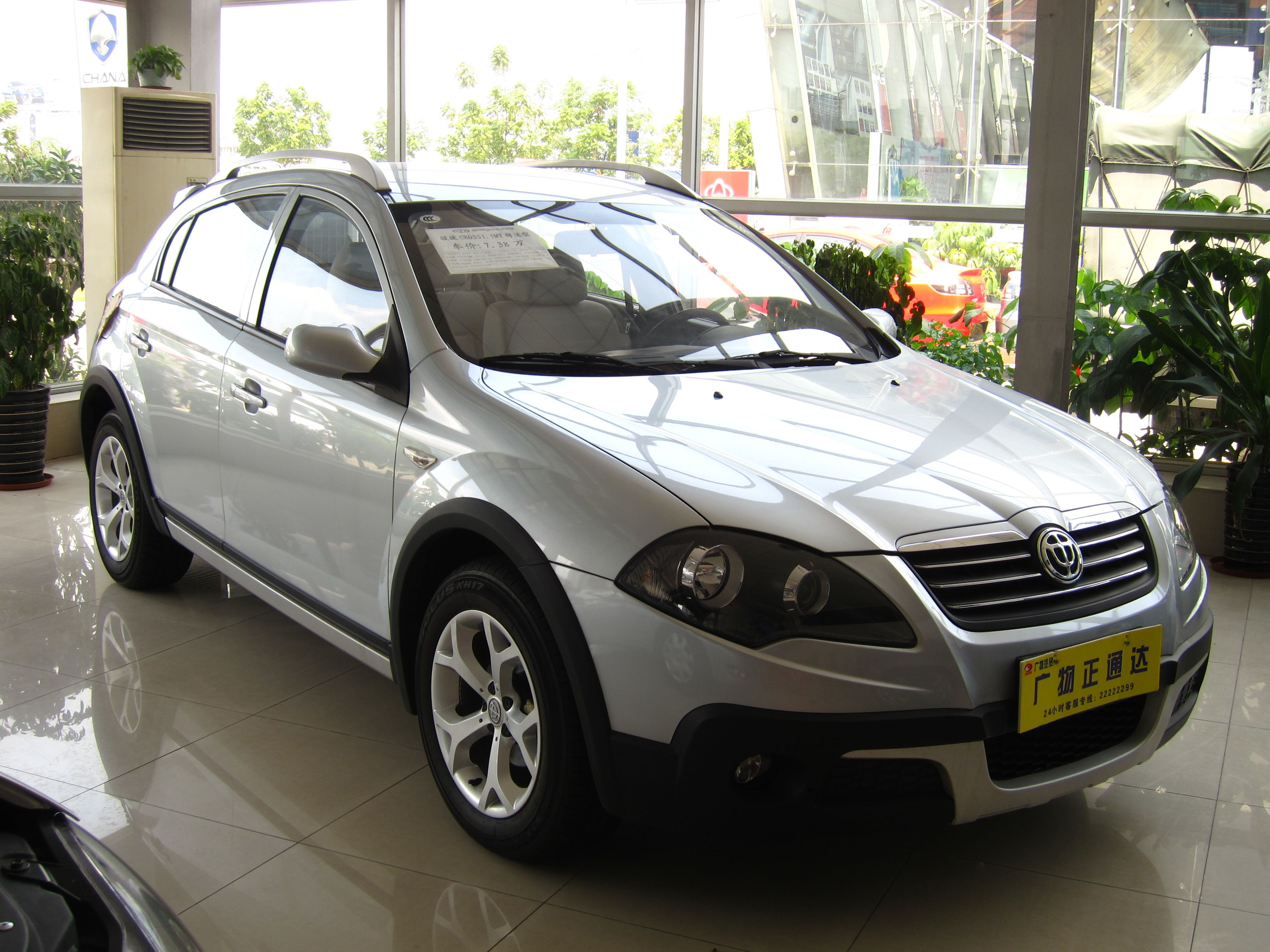
BS2 FRV Cross

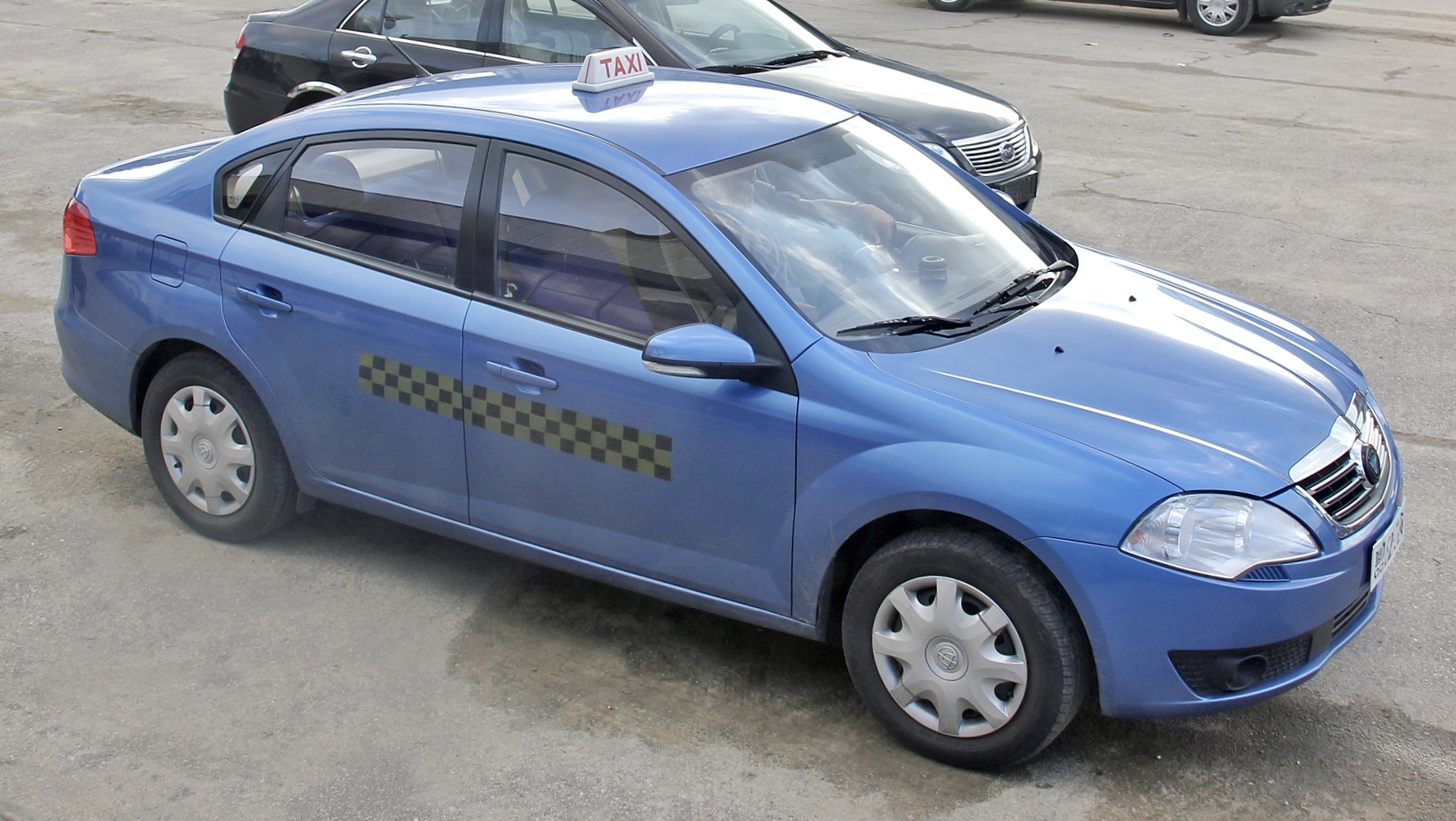
Pyonghwa Hwiparam III taxi in North Korea
