= Bavarian Auto Group =

Egyptian automotive company

- Native name: المجموعة البافارية للسيارات
- Industry: Automotive industry
- Founded: March 2003
- Founder: H.E. Dr. Issa Al Kawari
- Defunct: November 2022
- Fate: Bought out and renamed Global Auto Group
- Headquarters: Cairo, Egypt
- Area served: Egypt
- Key people: Farid El Tobgui
- Products: Automobiles
- Number of employees: 1700
- Website: www.bag-eg.com

The Bavarian Auto Group (BAG) was an assembler and distributor of motor vehicles in Egypt. It was founded in 2003, by the Issa Al-Kawari, the financial manager of the Qatari royal family (99%), and Egyptian investor Farid al-Tobgui (1%), who was appointed as BAG's CEO. BAG was known for assembling complete knockdown kits (CKD) of a selection of BMW vehicles for the local market in its assembly plant in 6th of October City, Giza from 2004, in addition to importing other fully built BMW models as well as MINI vehicles. BAG had assembly and distribution partnerships with other manufacturers including Mahindra & Mahindra, Brilliance, Jinbei, and Great Wall. In 2022, BAG investors were bought out by a consortium comprising BMW importers and distributors in Kuwait, Ali Alghanim & Sons Automotive, and Saudi Arabia, Mohamed Yousuf Naghi Motors, and local investors in Egypt, Al-Organi Group and Al-Safi Group. BAG was renamed as the Global Auto Group, and a new BMW and MINI assembly, import and distribution agreement was signed with BMW Group in November 2022. The group has announced the start of assembling luxury models of the BMW brand locally.

== Al Fotouh Company for Vehicle Assembly ==
The Al Fotouh Company for Vehicle Assembly or short ACVA, was the first step from BMW to manufacturing its vehicles in Egypt alone. It was founded in November 1999 in a small provisional assembling plant near to the current BAG plant. The production line were adopted from the former Egyptian BMW manufacturer Modern Motors in Cairo.

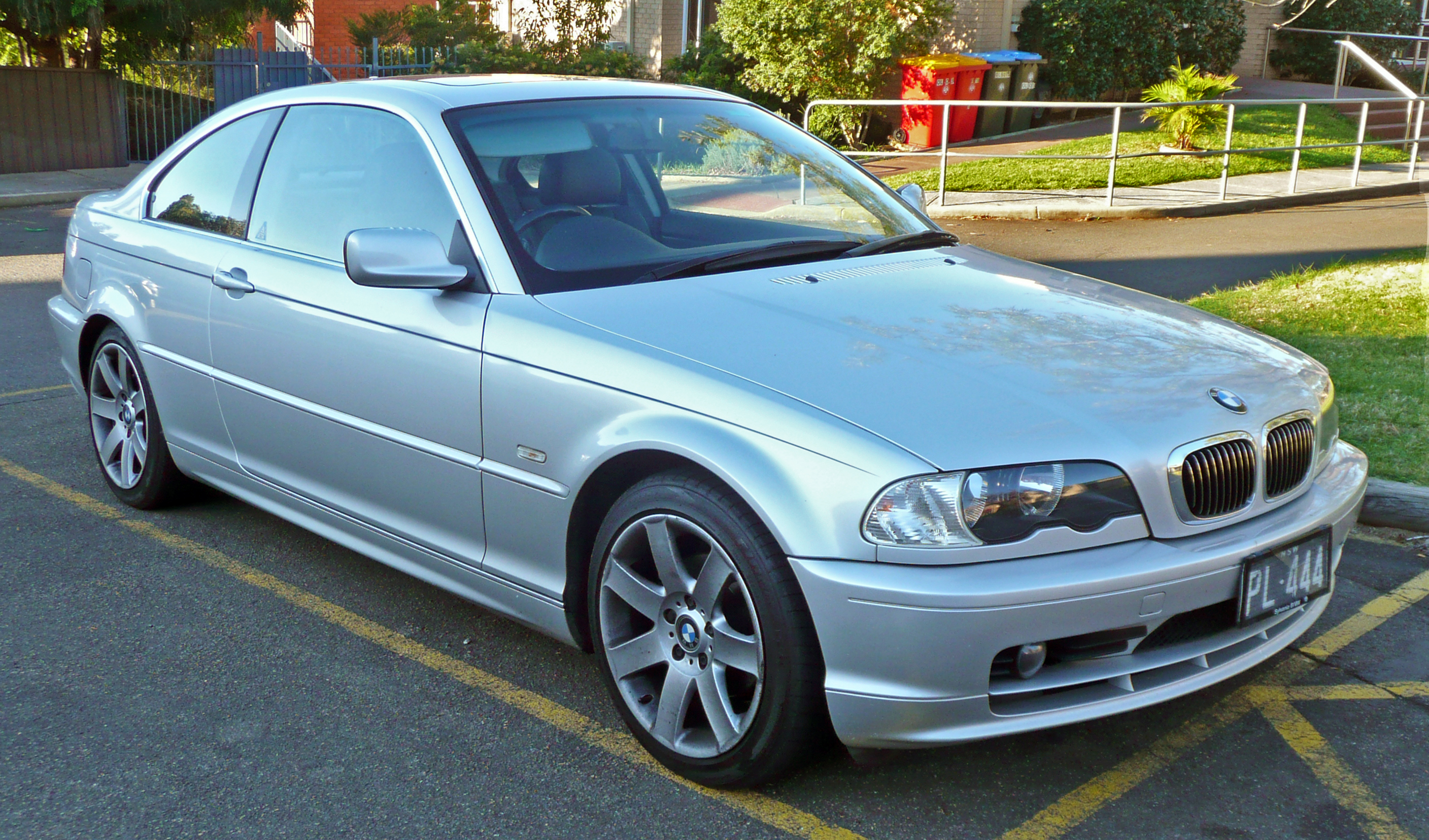
BMW 3 Series
2000–2003

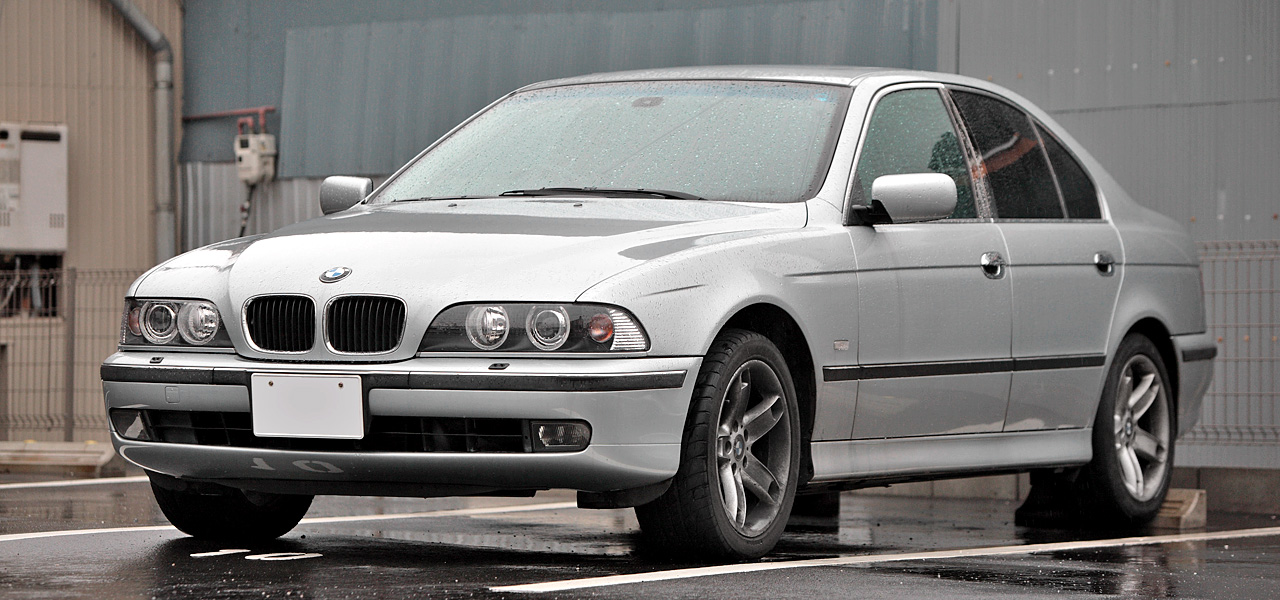
BMW 5 Series
2000–2003

== BAG products ==
=== Former Models ===
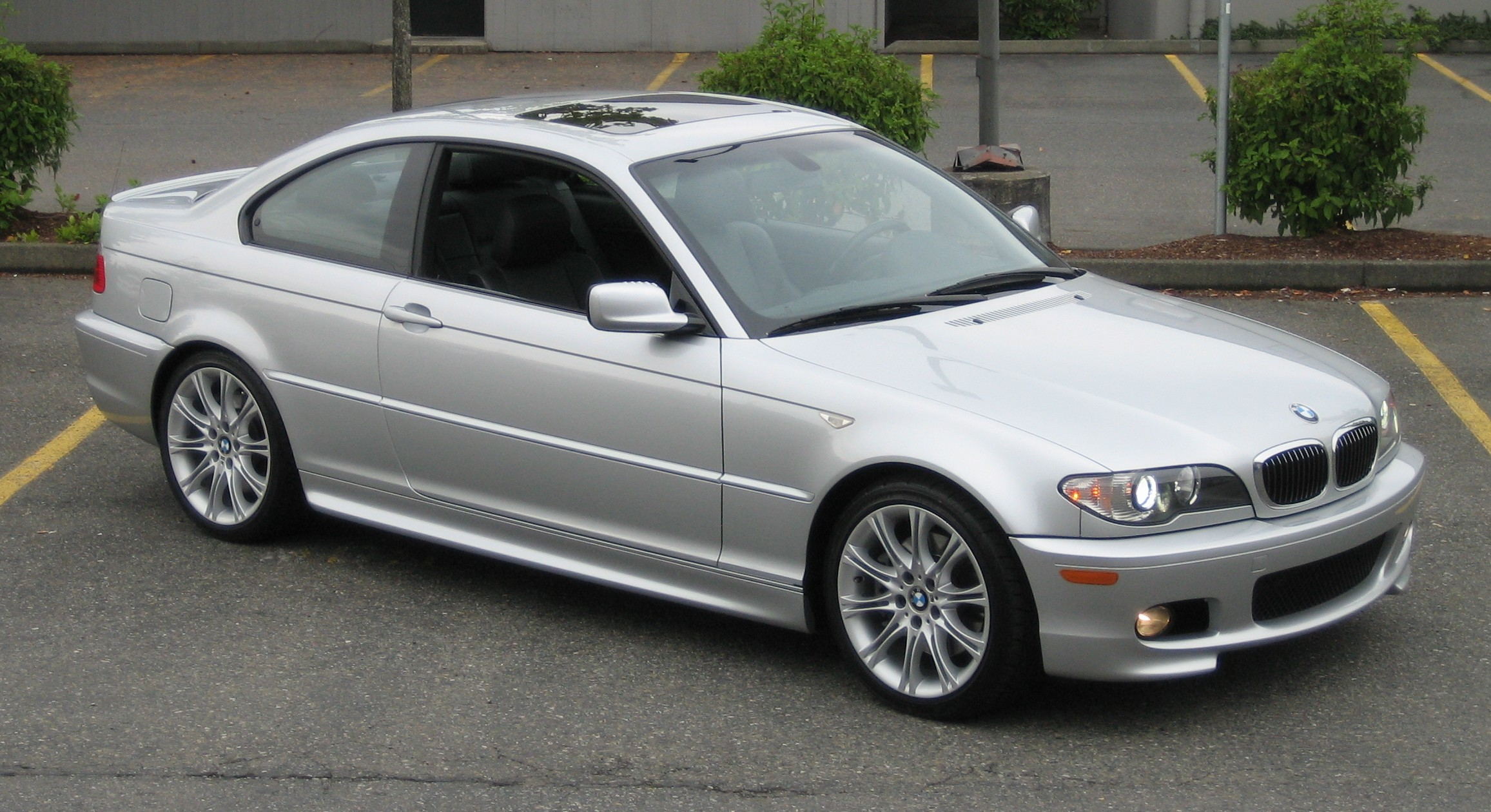
BMW 3 Series
2004–2007

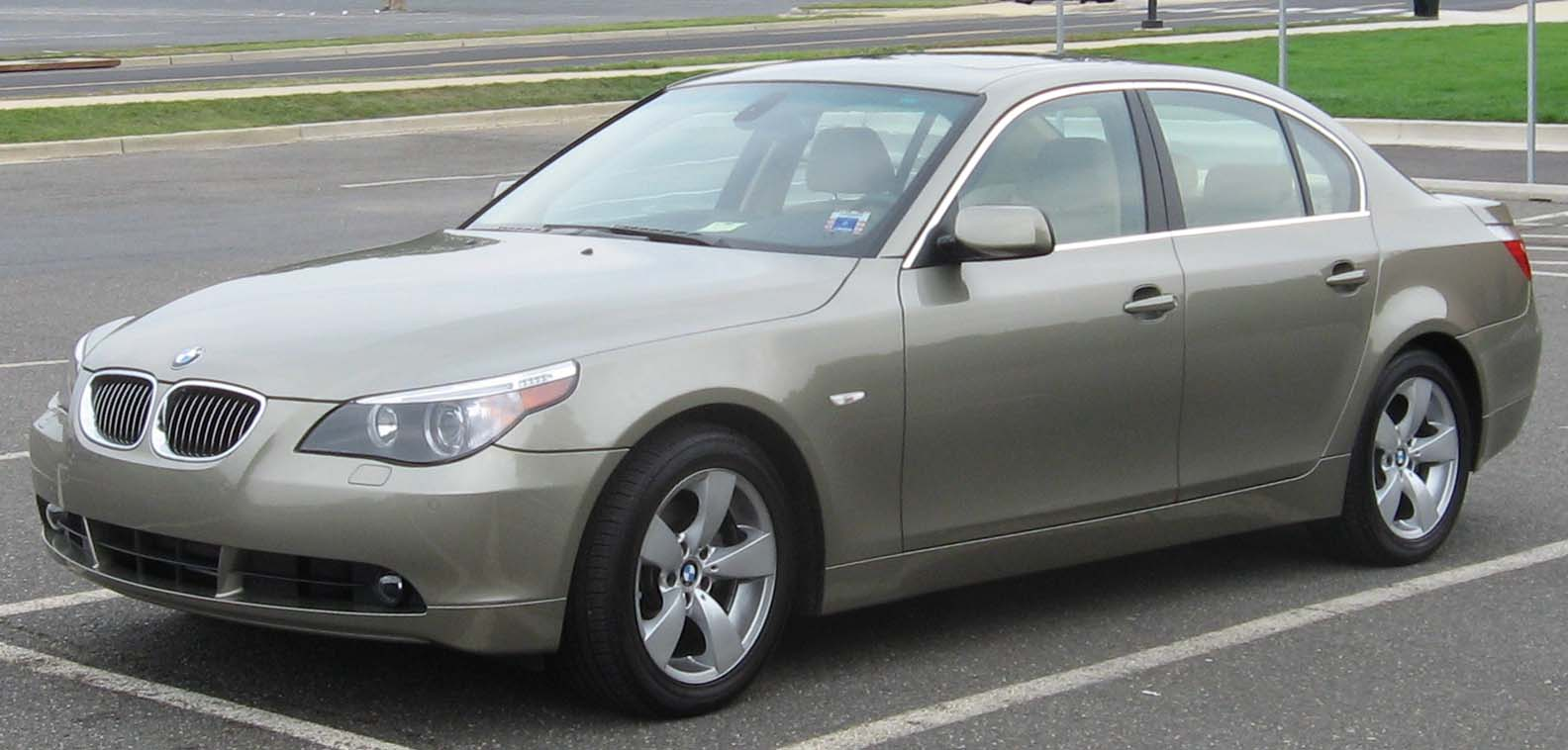
BMW 5 Series
2004–2010

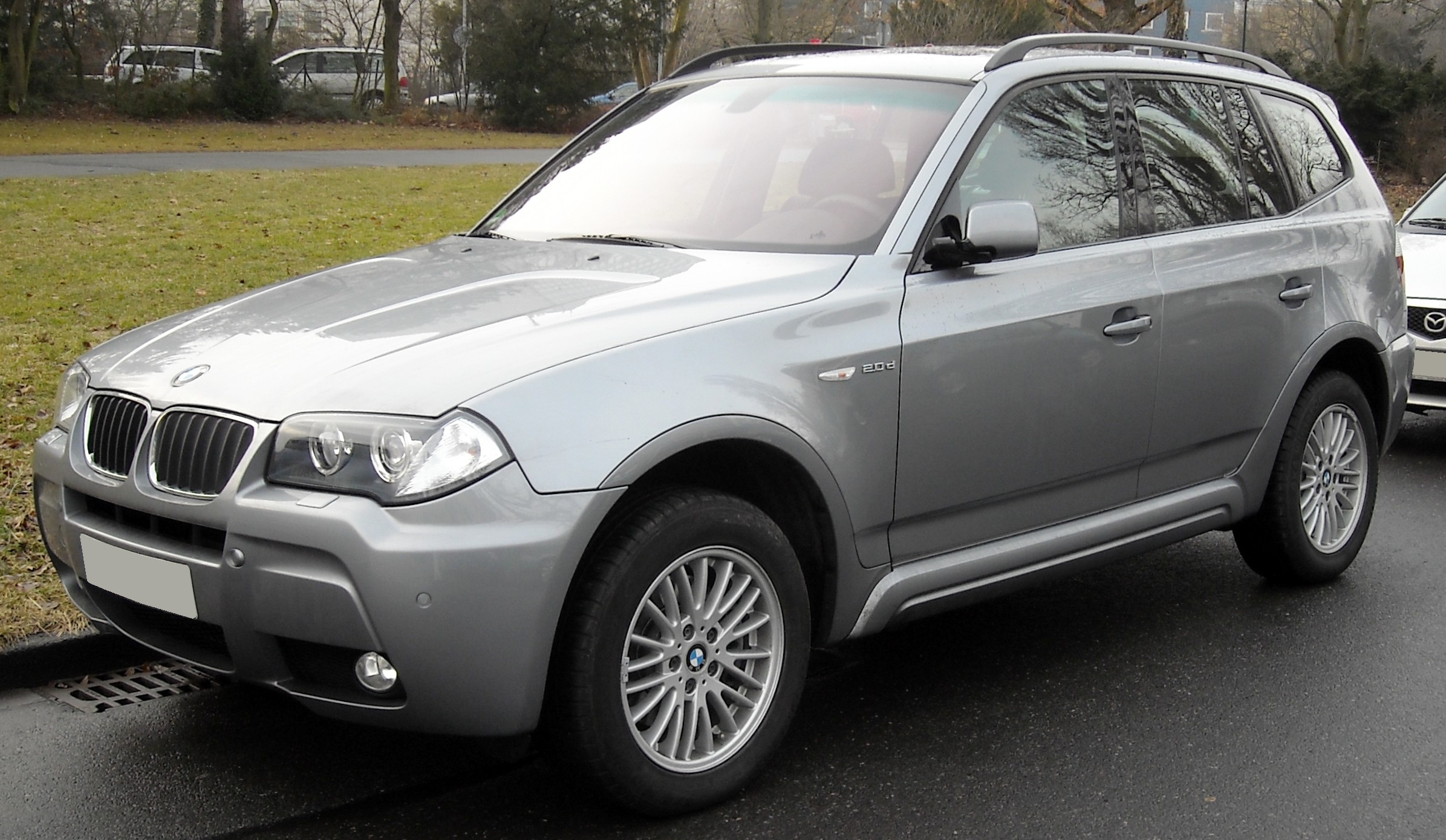
BMW X3
2004–2010

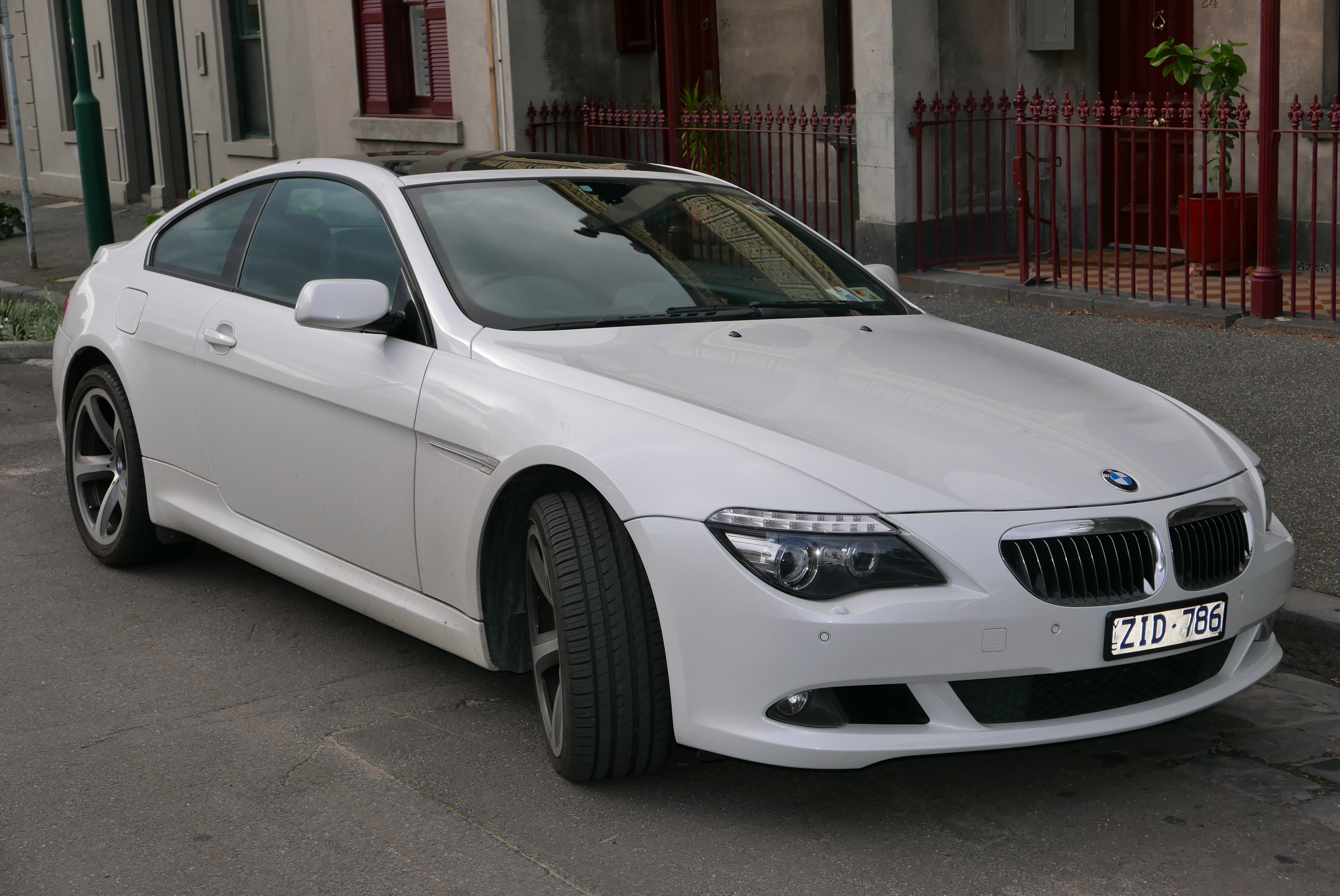
BMW Individual 6 Series
2008–2010

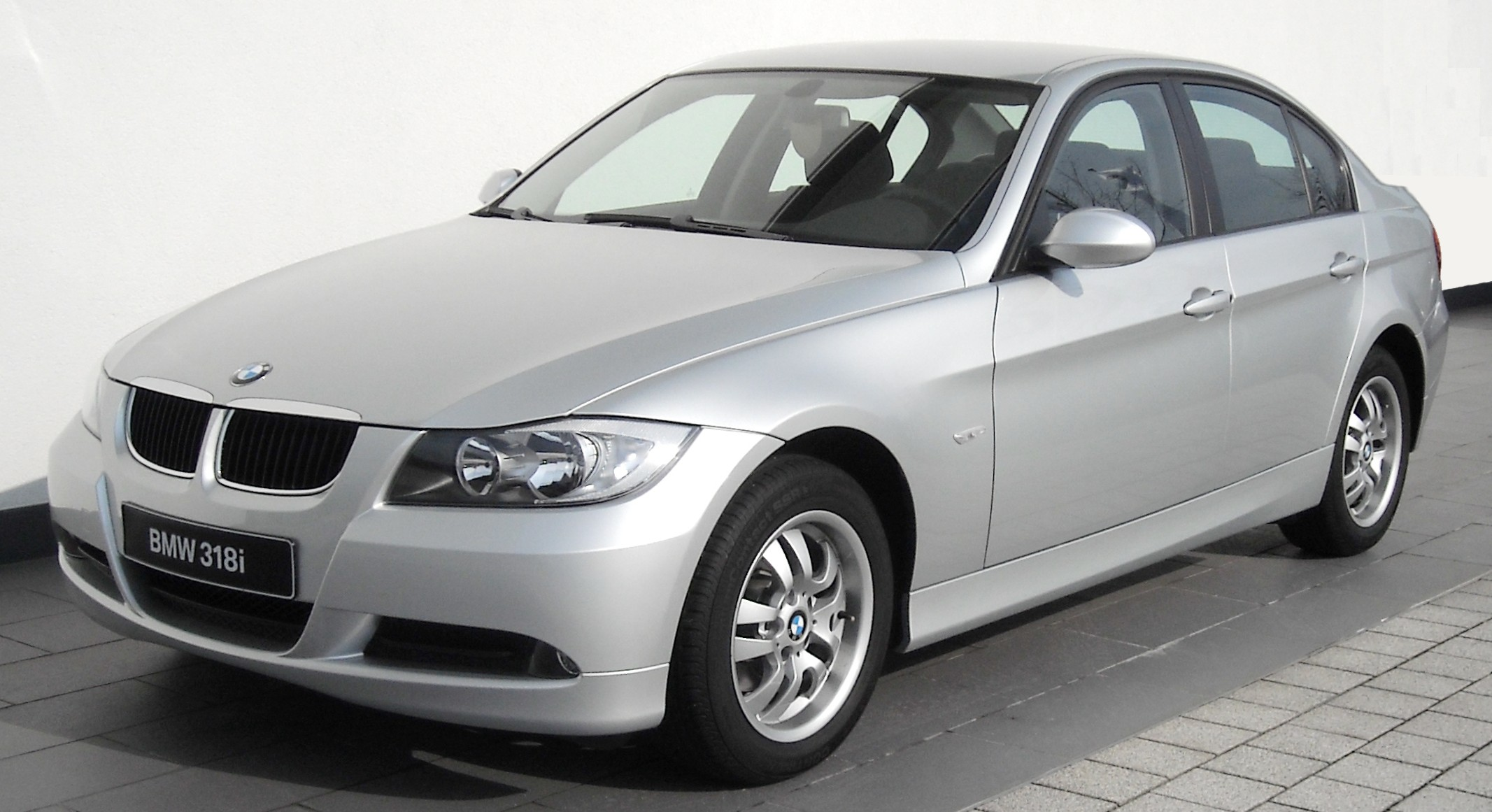
BMW 3 Series
2007–2013

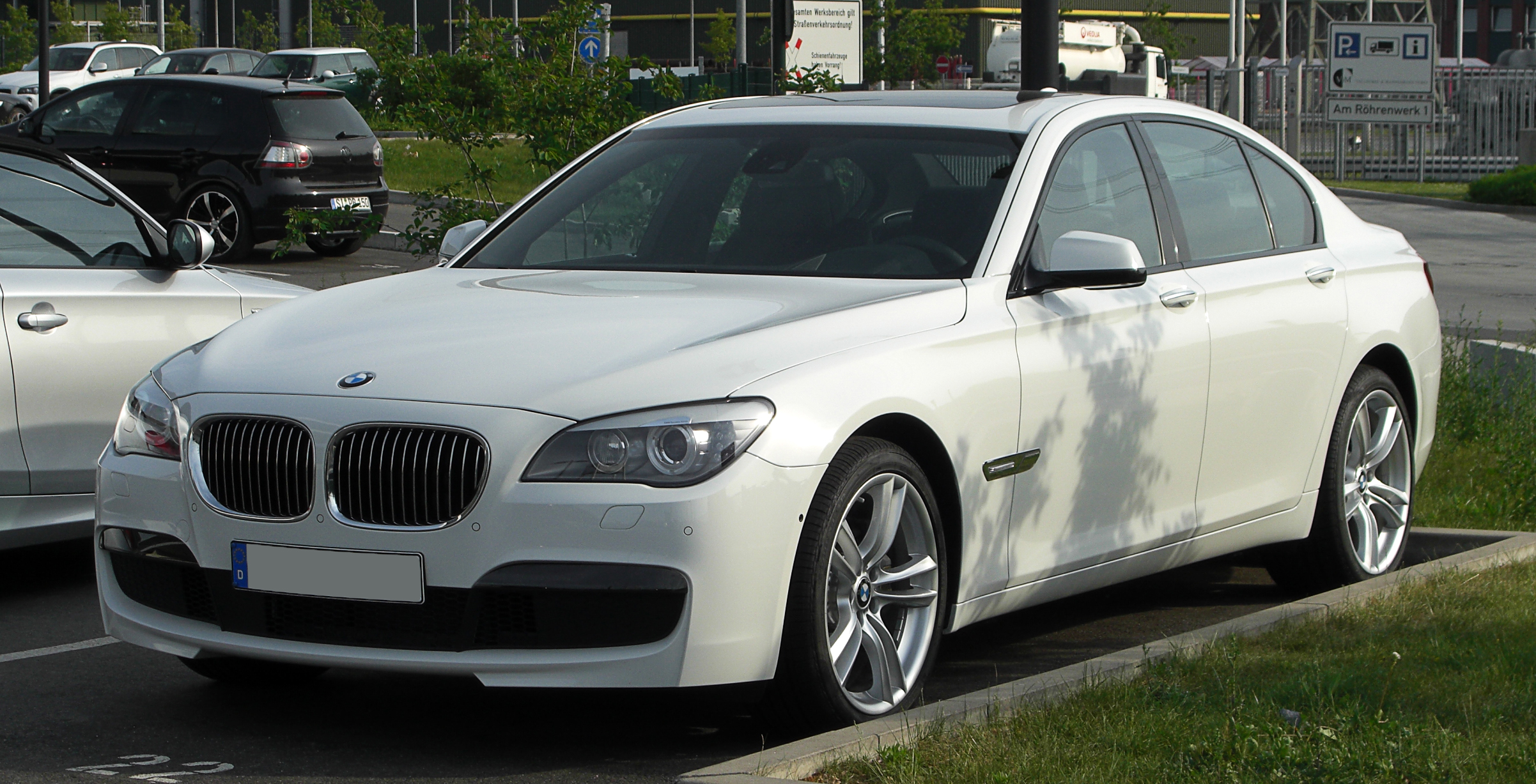
BMW Individual 7 Series
2009–2015

=== Current models ===
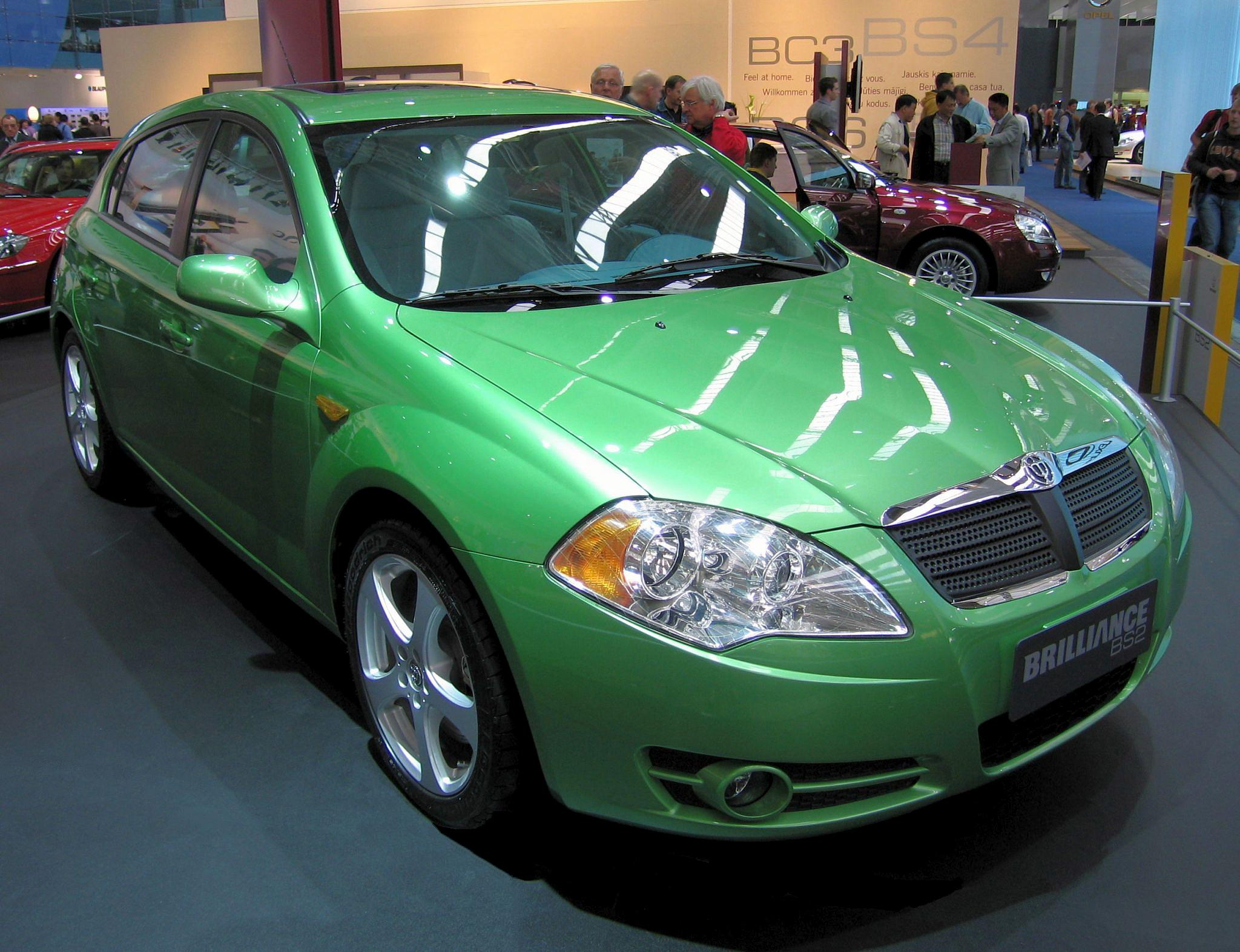
Brilliance Splendor FRV
Brilliance Splendor FSV
2009–present

=== Former models ===
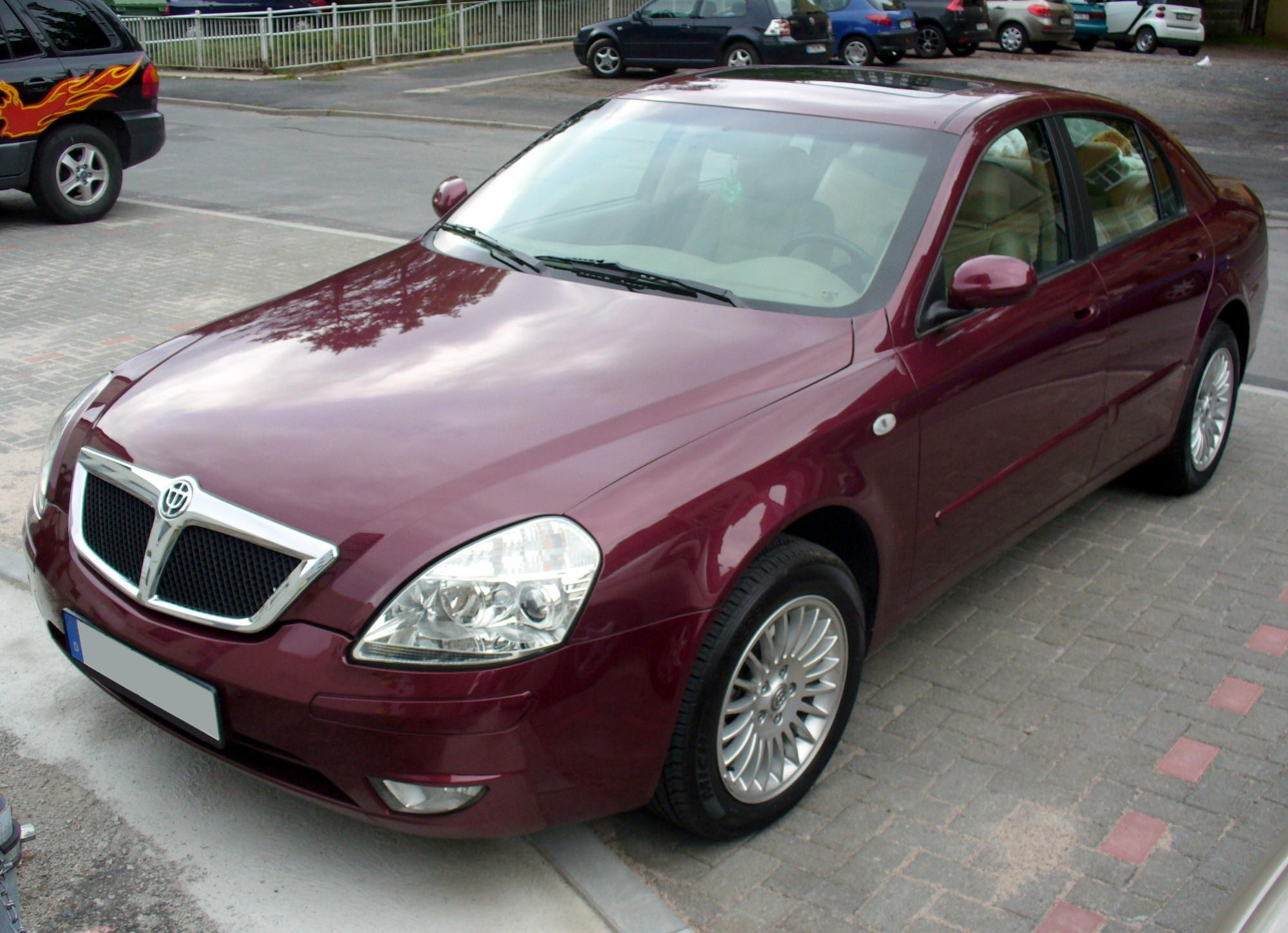
Brilliance Galena
2005–2010

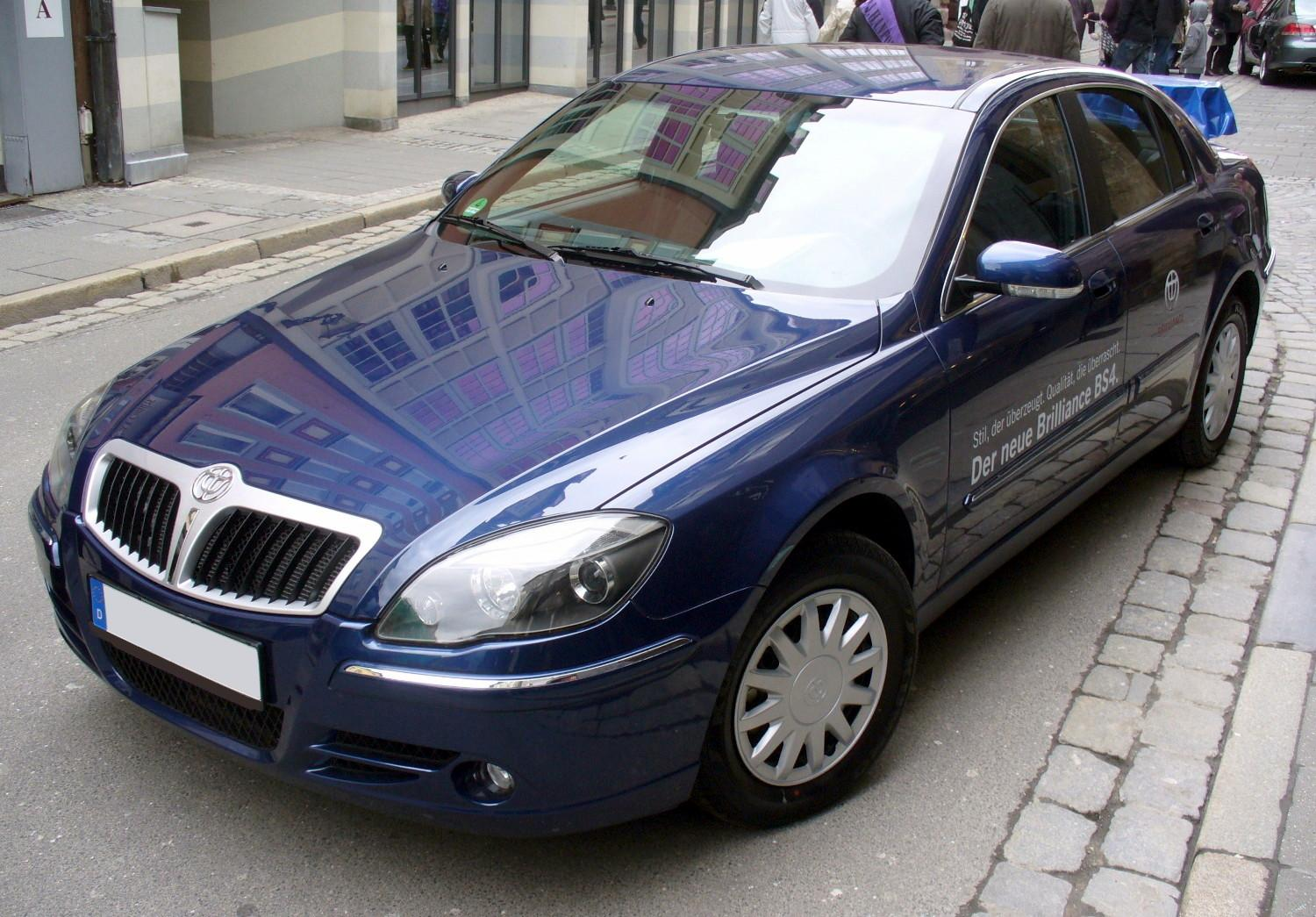
Brilliance Splendor
2006–2014

=== Jinbei ===
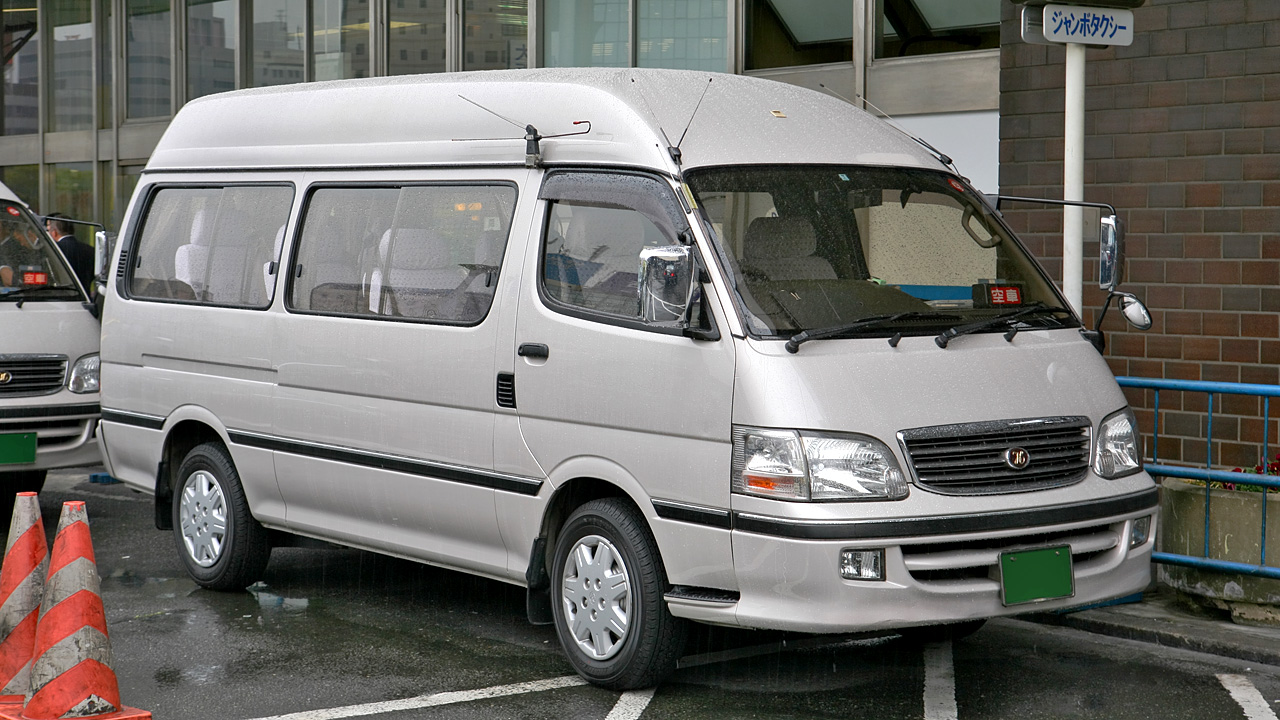
Jinbei Cargo Van 99 Model
2005

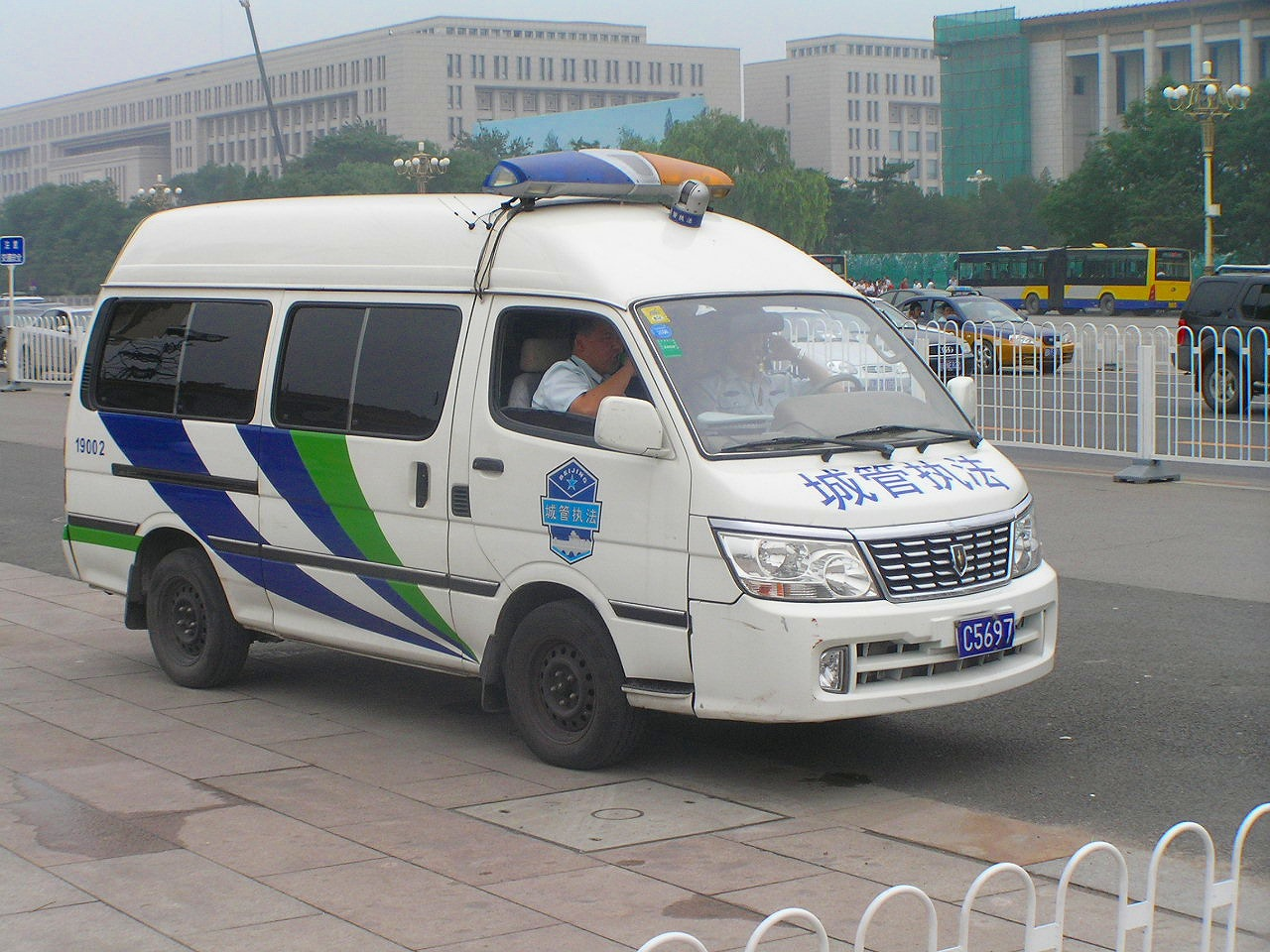
Jinbei Cargo Van 2003 Model
2005

=== Mahindra ===
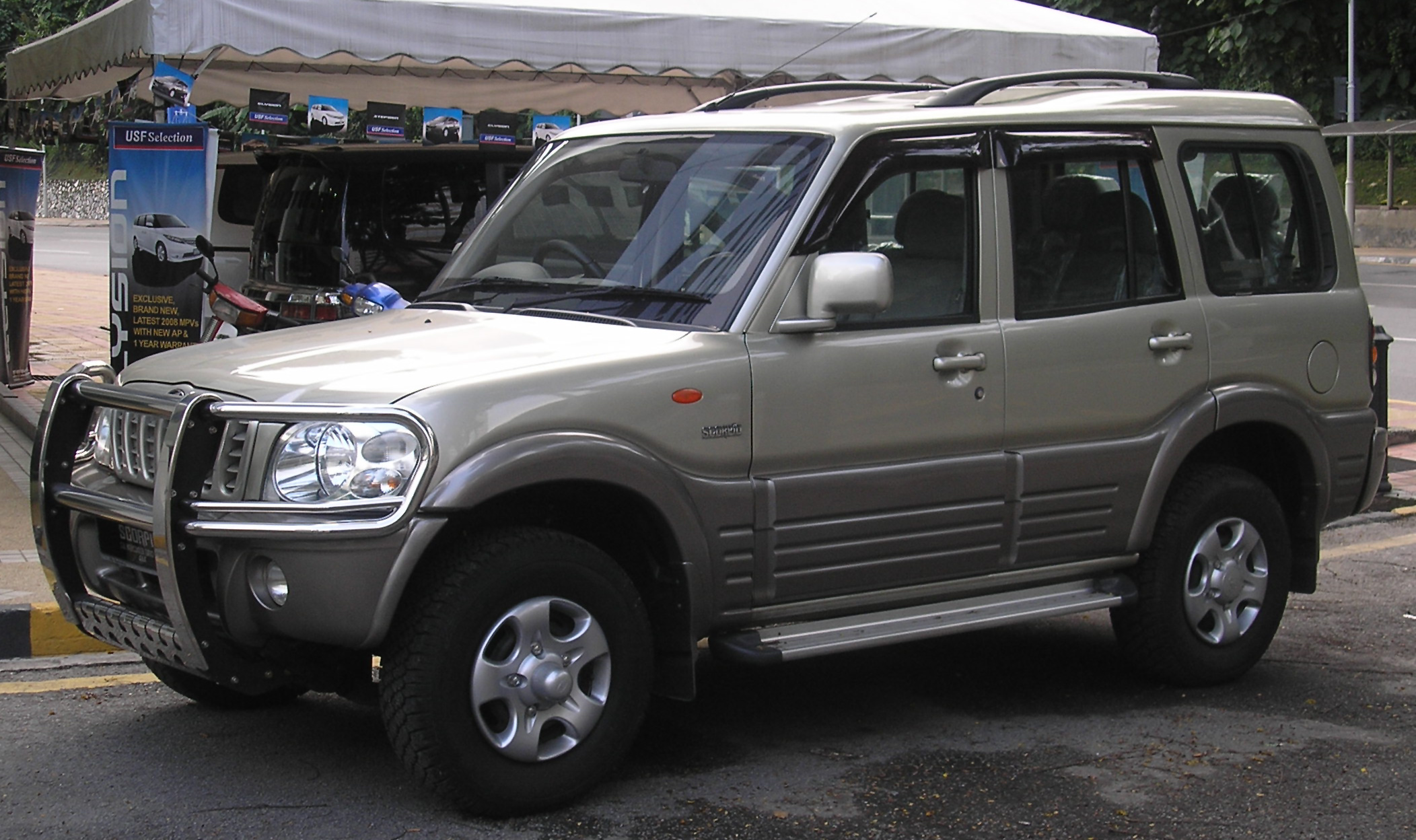
Mahindra Scorpio
2010
