= SWM Tiger =

Chinese compact crossover SUV

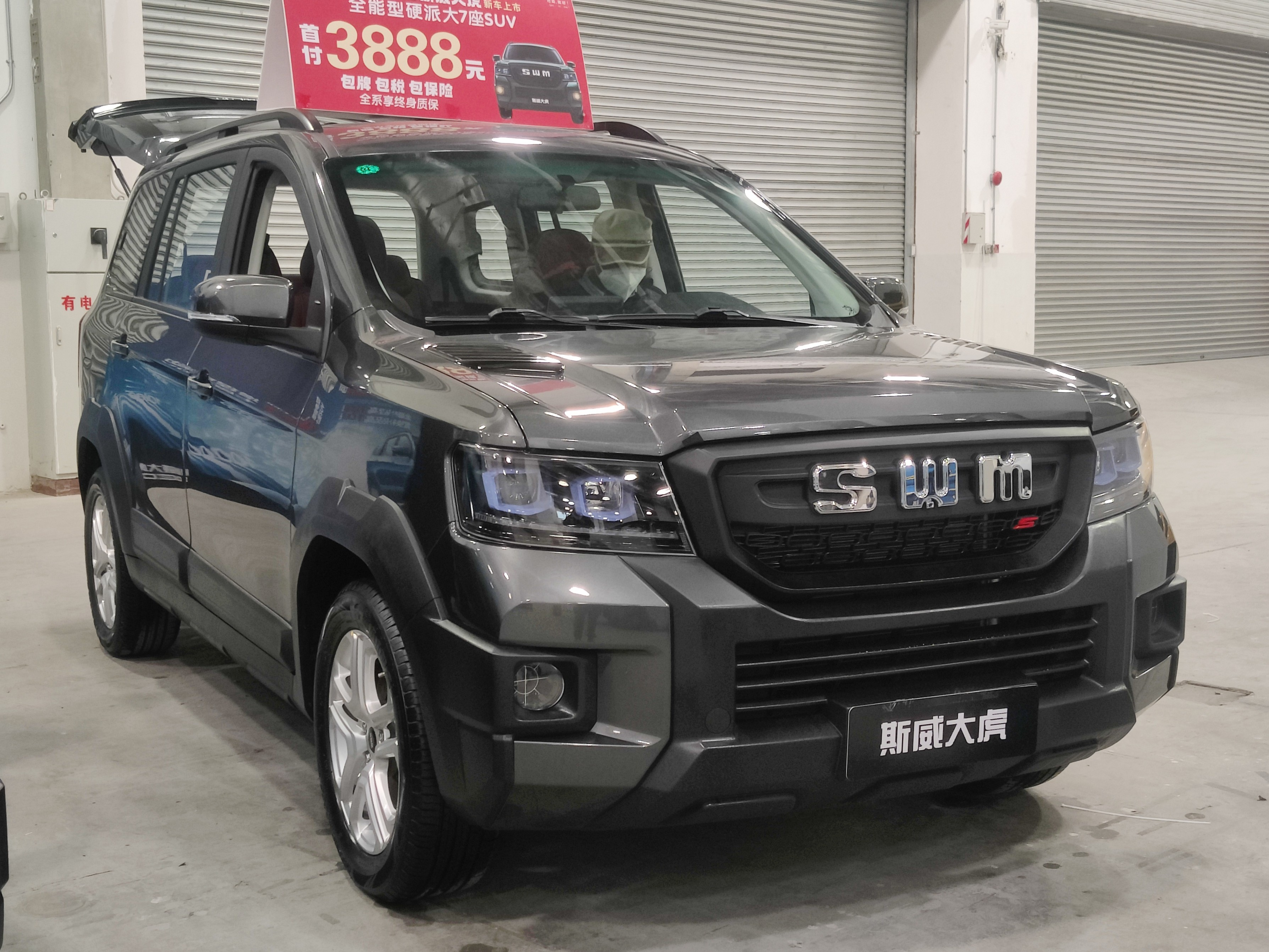

Overview
- Manufacturer: SWM Motors
- Also called: SWM G03F (Europe); Cirelli 1 (Italy)
- Production: 2022–present
- Assembly: Chongqing, China

Body and chassis
- Class: Mid-size crossover SUV
- Body style: 5-door station wagon
- Related: Jinbei 750

Powertrain
- Engine: 1.5 L I4 (petrol)
- Transmission: 5-speed manual

Dimensions
- Wheelbase: 2,780 mm (109.4 in)
- Length: 4,605 mm (181.3 in)
- Width: 1,815 mm (71.5 in)
- Height: 1,810–1,825 mm (71.3–71.9 in)

Chronology
- Predecessor: SWM X2; SWM X3

The SWM Tiger (Chinese: 大虎) is a 7-seater mid-size crossover SUV that is manufactured by the Chinese manufacturer SWM (automobiles) of Brilliance Shineray. The SWM Tiger was launched in August 2022 in China as a more rugged model compared to the SWM X3 riding on the same platform. In October 2024, is announced for sale in Italy under the name SWM G03F, and the SWM Tiger EDi version will be marketed under the name XL30 EV.

== Overview ==
The SWM Tiger is a 7-seater vehicle with a 7-seat layout of 2+2+3. The power of the SWM Tiger comes from 3 engine options including the 1.5 liter DG15 engine with a maximum power of 85 kW (116 horsepower), and the fuel consumption of the engine declared by the Ministry of Industry and Information Technology is 6.90L/100km. Prices of the SWM Tiger range from 59,900 yuan to 78,900 yuan.

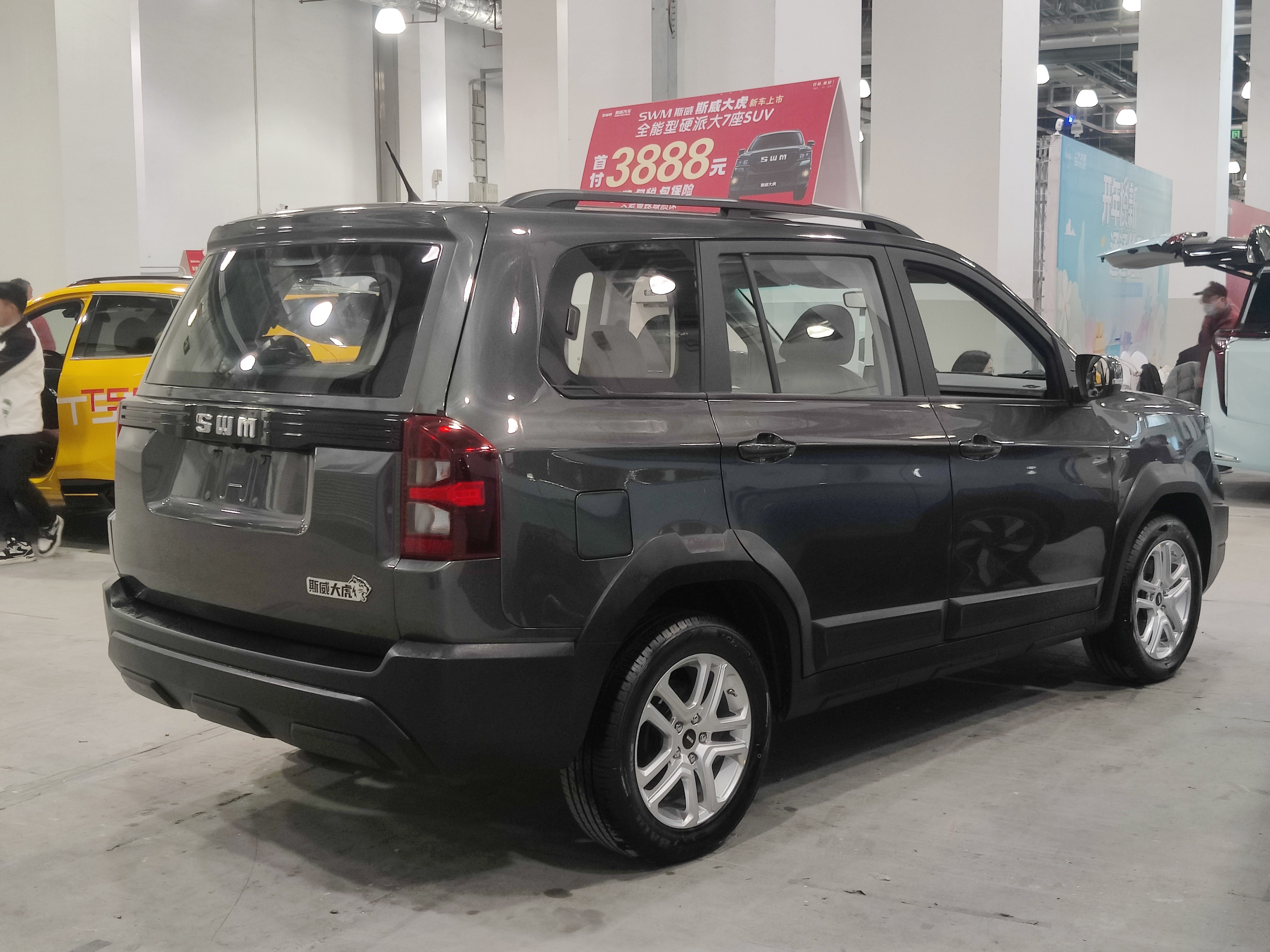
SWM Tiger rear

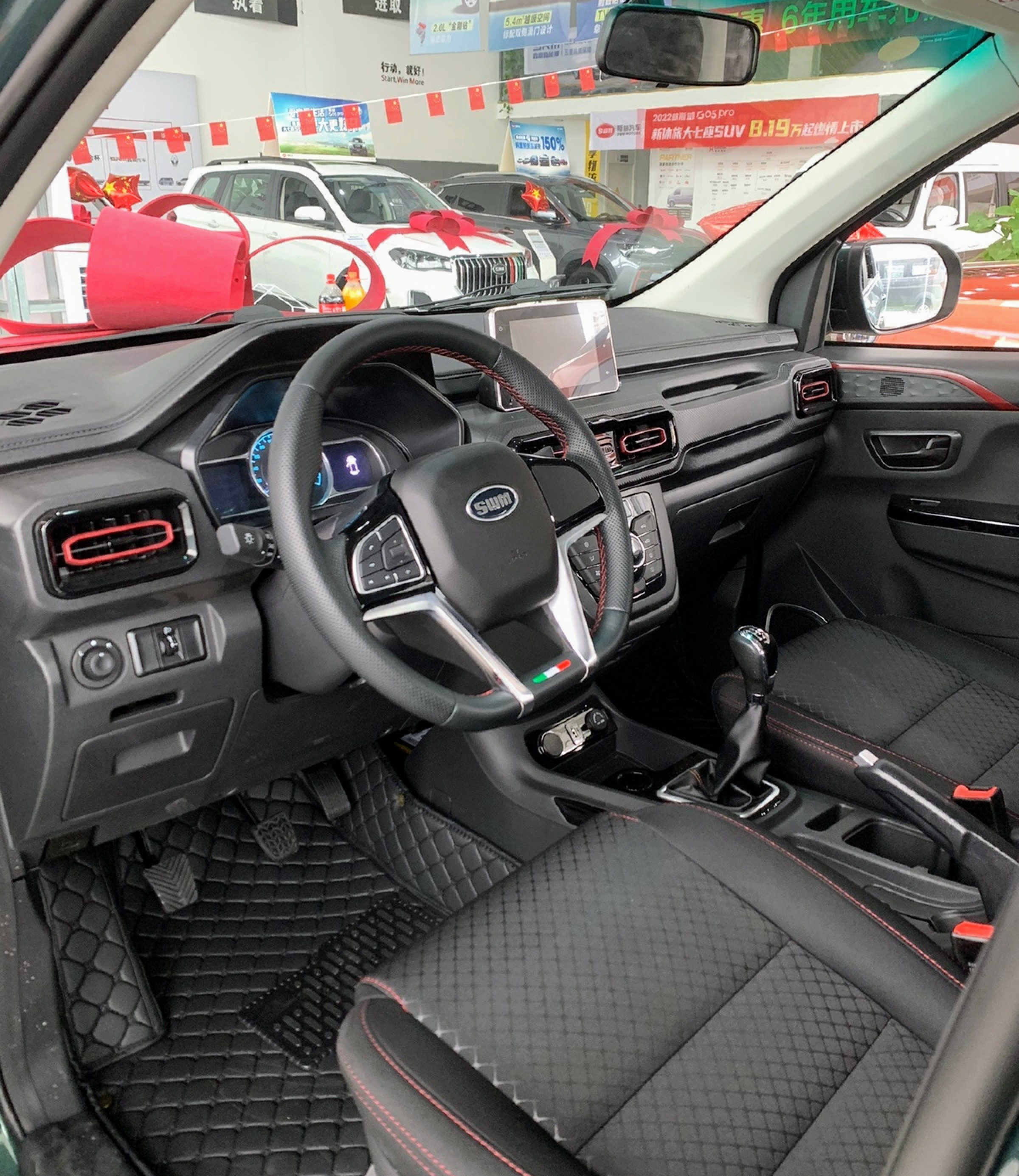
SWM Tiger interior

== SWM Tiger EDi ==
The SWM Tiger EDi is the extended-range electric vehicle version of the regular SWM Tiger. The powertrain of the SWM Tiger EDi was jointly developed by SWM and FinDreams, a company under BYD. The Tiger EDi is equipped with a 1.5-liter four-cylinder petrol engine that only powers the battery. The actual power that drives the front wheel comes from an electric motor with 105 kW (143 hp) and 210 N⋅m (155 lb⋅ft). The battery of the SWM Tiger EDi is LFP supporting an all-electric range of 51 km (32 mi). The combined range of the Tiger EDi with the range-extender exceeds 1,000 km (620 mi).

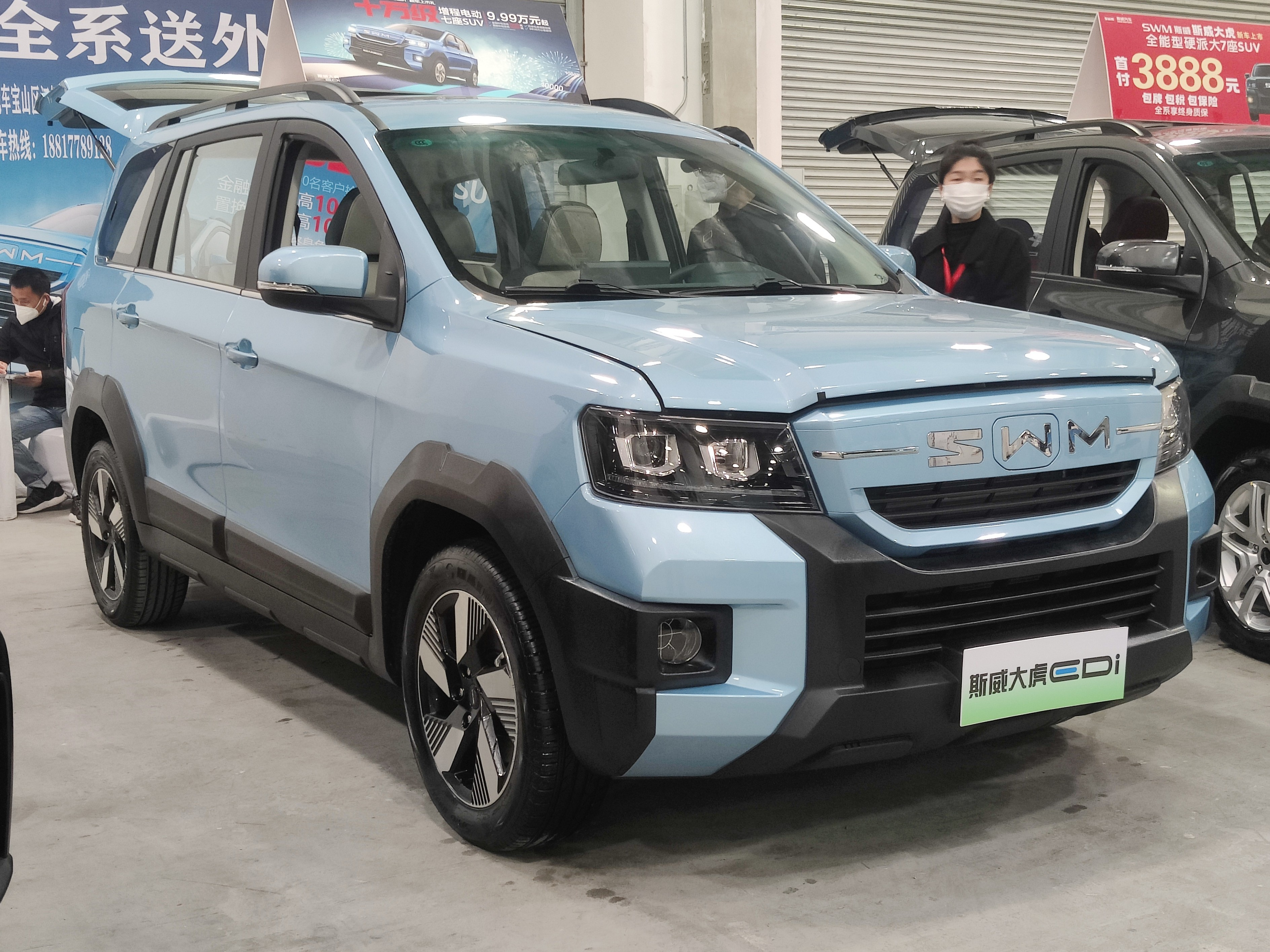
SWM Tiger EDi front

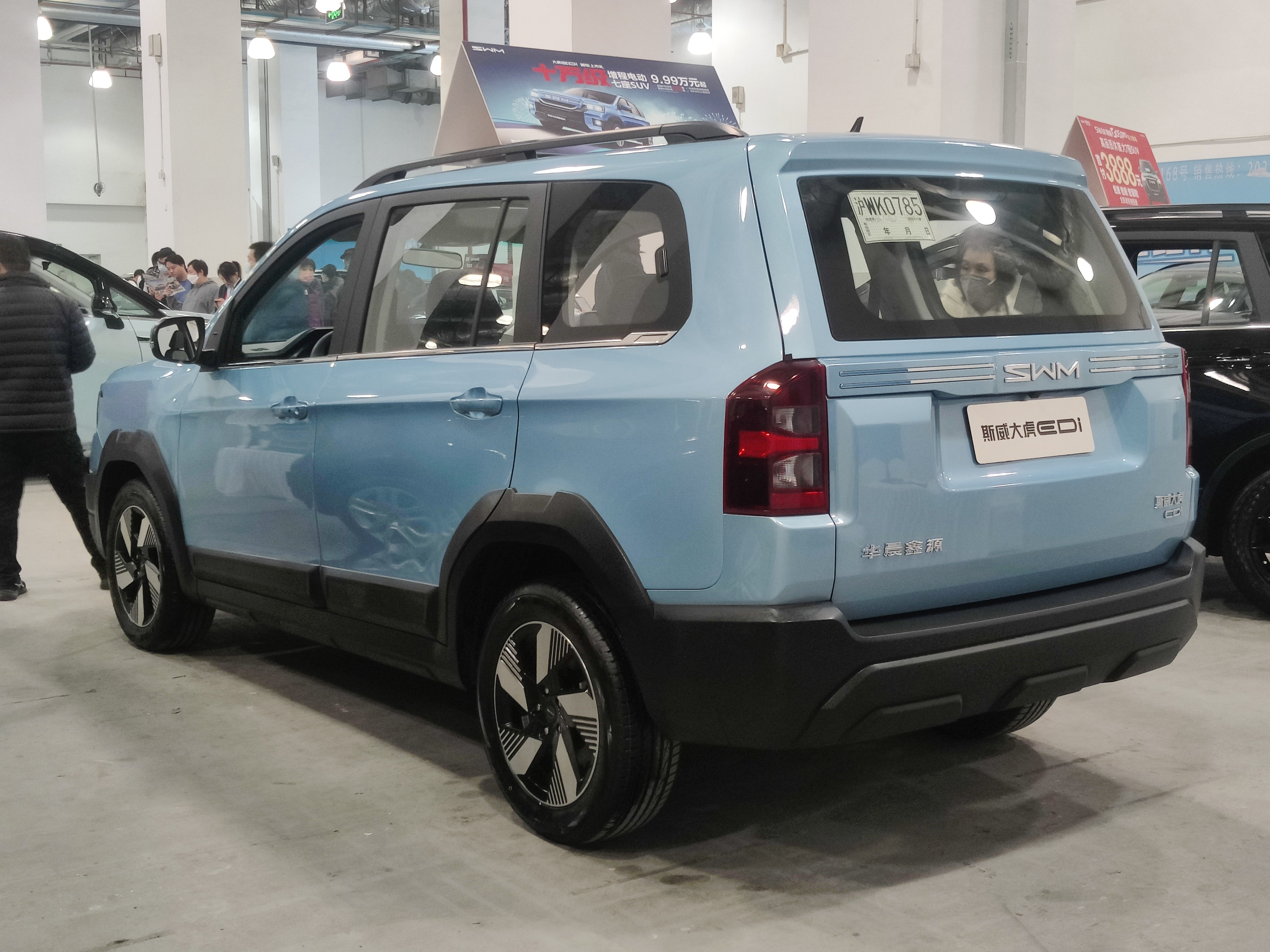
SWM Tiger EDi rear

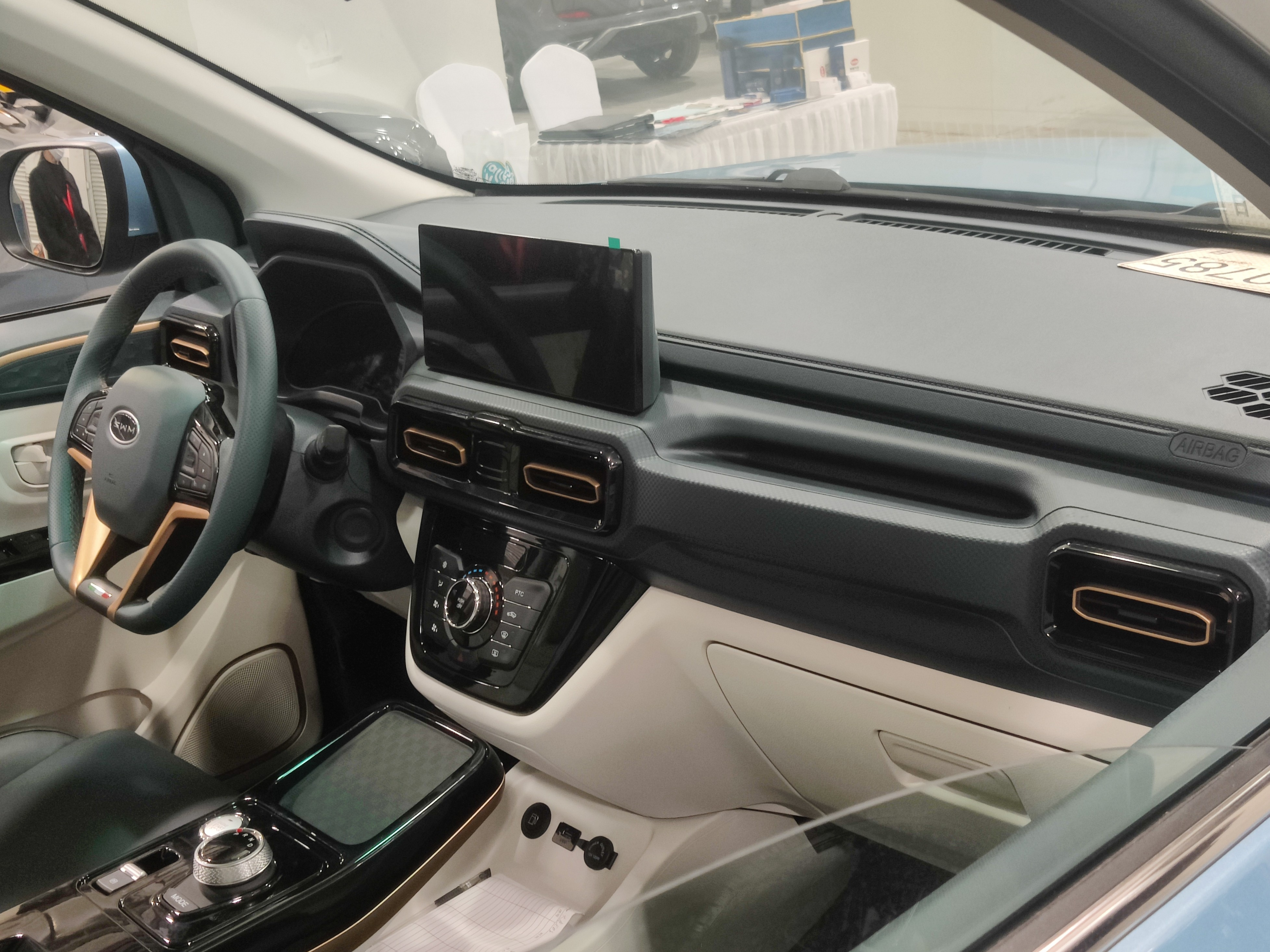
SWM Tiger EDi interior

== Sales ==
Year	China		
Year	Tiger	EDi	Total
2023	638	429	1,067
2024	677	374	1,051
2025	135	14	149
