= SWM Motors =

Chinese automotive brand

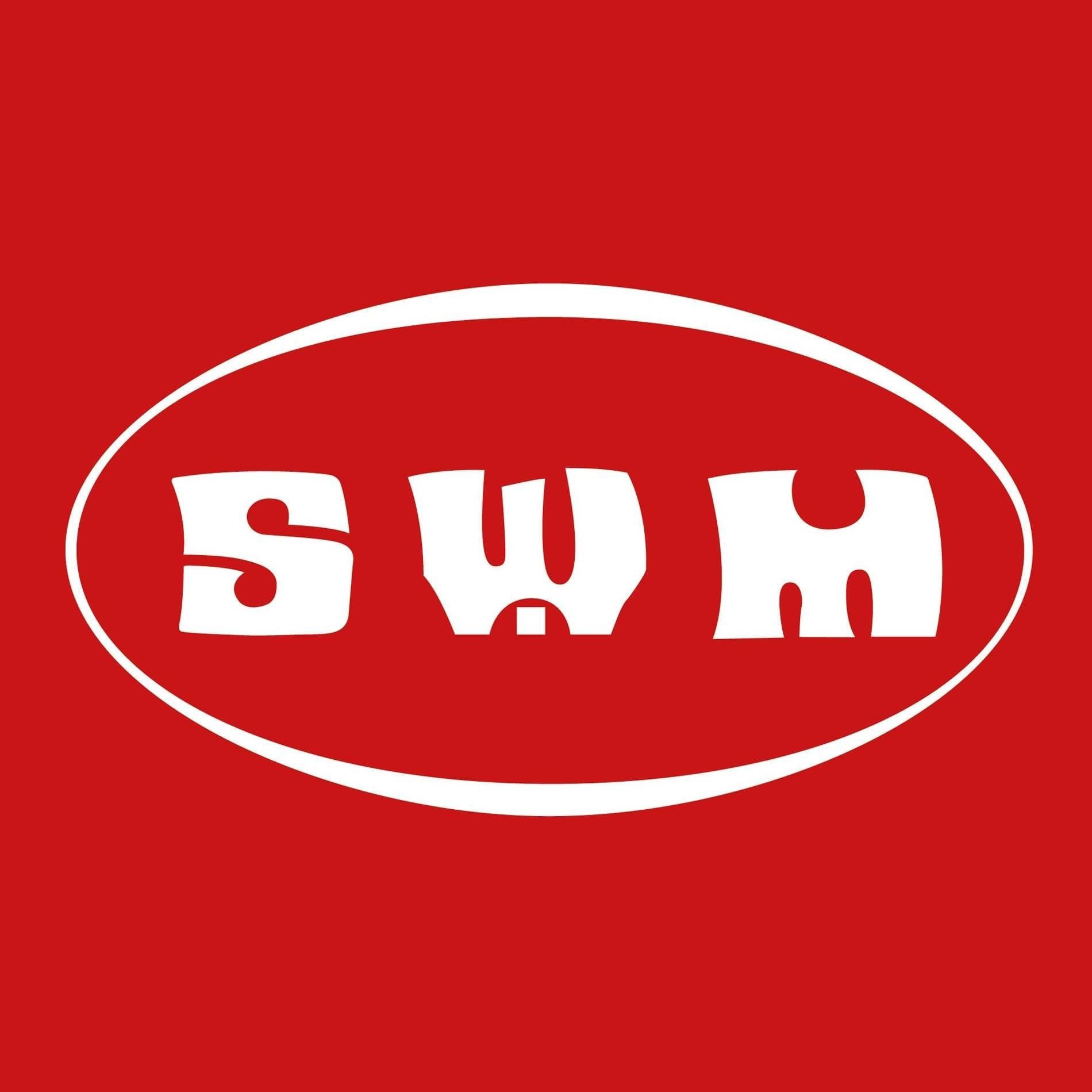
- Type: Private
- Industry: Automotive manufacturing
- Founded: 2016; 10 years ago
- Founder: Daxing Gong
- Headquarters: Chongqing, China
- Area served: China
- Products: Automobiles
- Website: www.swmmotors.com.cn

SWM Motors is a Chinese automobile brand launched in 2016.

Originally, the SWM brand was founded in Milan, Italy in 1971, as a motorcycle manufacturer. In 2014 it was acquired by Xinyuan Holdings Co., Ltd. in Chongqing, China. On July 27, 2016, the SWM brand was launched in Beijing and officially entered the passenger car market. SWM Motors has its design center in Milan, and its manufacturing base in Chongqing. From 2016 to 2022, SWM Automobile has launched a number of SUV models. With the rise of new energy technologies, SWM Automobile has begun to transform into new energy vehicles, including hybrid and purely electric models.

== History ==
The SWM brand was founded in Milan in 1971 with the launch of the Six Days off-road motorcycle. It also produces off-road, enduro and motocross motorcycles equipped with Sachs and Rotax engines.

In October 2014, Xinyuan Group acquired the Italian brand SWM and established an automotive design center in Milan, Italy.

On July 27, 2016, SWM Motors launched its new brand at Beijing 751D•PARK Fashion Design Plaza.

In September 2016, SWM Motors launched the large 7-seater SUV named SWM X7.

In 2017, SWM Motors' first pure electric SUV concept car EROE was unveiled at the Shanghai International Auto Show. In the same year, Xinyuan Automobile became the official partner of Inter Milan Football Club. At the same time, Italian star Roberto Gagliardini became the spokesperson for SWM.

In 2017, SWM launched the SWM X3 at the Shanghai Auto Show in China. It was reported that the SWM X3 would be positioned as a compact SUV.

On March 29, 2018, SWM G01, a large five-seater SUV built on the new G platform, was officially launched in Milan.

In 2019, the SWM brand entered the Spanish market with two models, the G01 and G01F.

On October 16, 2020, the upgraded version of SWM G05 (SWM G05pro) was launched.

On May 31, 2020, the SWM's versatile large 7-seat SUV (X7) was launched.

In 2022, SWM G01 was listed as the best-selling SUV of the year in Ecuador.

On May 20, 2022, SWM Motors and Fudi Power signed a "Cooperation Intention Agreement" to reach a strategic cooperation intention on powertrain systems and new energy technologies.

On August 18, 2022, SWM Motors released the SWM Dahu mid-size 7-seater SUV.

In November 2022, SWM entered the German market, launching the G01F model.

In 2023, SWM entered the Turkish market. The G01, G01F, G03F and X30L EV light commercial vehicles and the D-SUV model G05 were introduced to Turkish consumers.

On February 3, 2023, SWM Tiger EDi was launched in two configurations: 5-seater and 7-seater.

In April 2023, the SWM series passenger cars will be launched in Russia.

In March 2024, the SWM brand was officially launched in Russia and became the official partner of F.C. Lokomotiv Moscow.

The resurgence of the SWM brand started with six new models displayed at EICMA 2014 with funding for the company coming from China via the entity Shineray Group. SWM will keep manufacturing motorcycles in Italy with some of its engines acquired from the old Husqvarna (engines replaced by KTM units following the acquisition by Peirer). Shineray Group later revealed the SWM Automotive brand in 2016 in Beijing, China and launched the first product, the 7-seater SWM X7 midsize crossover shortly after.

== R&D and Manufacturing ==
SWM Automobile has production and R&D institutions in Milan and a SWM Automobile Factory in Chongqing Fuling. The park covers an area of 1,704 acres, with a total investment of 4.5 billion yuan, and produces more than 300,000 passenger cars and 300,000 engines each year. It has formed an independent development system in vehicle design, engine development, performance matching, etc., and currently has key design capabilities such as data analysis, CAE simulation design, NVH analysis, reliability verification, chassis matching, and vehicle electrical matching. It has built advanced laboratories such as multi-functional environmental warehouses and emission warehouses, and has high-end testing equipment such as NVH.

=== Operations and Product Lines ===
SWM Automobiles focuses on designing, engineering, and selling passenger vehicles, mainly SUVs.

•Design and R&D: The company maintains design and research and development centers in Milan, Italy, and Chongqing, China, aiming to blend Italian stylistic elements with its engineering and manufacturing processes.

•Manufacturing: Primary production takes place at a manufacturing base in the Fuling District of Chongqing, which has a reported annual capacity of 300,000 vehicles and 300,000 engines.

•Product Portfolio: The brand's vehicle lineup encompasses SUVs and MPVs. Models include the G01 (including a G01 FF variant), G05, X3, and G03F EDi/Big Tiger (大虎) SUVs. These vehicles typically feature turbocharged gasoline engines and are positioned in the competitive affordable segment of the Chinese market.

•Global Sales: SWM Automobiles markets its vehicles in numerous countries outside China, including export markets in Europe, South America, and Southeast Asia.

=== Notable Vehicles ===
•SWM X7: The first production vehicle launched by the brand in 2016.

•SWM G05: A midsize SUV. In May 2025, it reported sales of 209 units in China, representing a significant year-over-year increase.

•SWM G01 FF: A compact SUV offering various trim levels with features like panoramic sunroofs, leather seats, and driver assistance systems.

•SWM G03F EDi/Big Tiger (大虎): An SUV available in configurations like a 1.5L 7-seater.

== Sponsorship ==
In February 2018, SWM Motors became the title sponsor of Chongqing Football Team, and the team adopted the new team name "Chongqing SWM Football Team", abbreviated as "Chongqing SWM". At the same time, the customized version of the SWM X7 for Chongqing SWM Football Team was launched.

In February 2019, SWM Motors sponsored the "China Football Association Member Association Champions League" (abbreviated as "China Champions League").

In November 2019, SWM Motors sponsored the Chongqing International Women's Half Marathon, and its G01 F served as the lead vehicle for this event.

== Models ==
=== Current ===
- SWM Tiger
- SWM G01
- SWM G05

=== Discontinued ===
- SWM X2
- SWM X3
- SWM X7

== Gallery ==
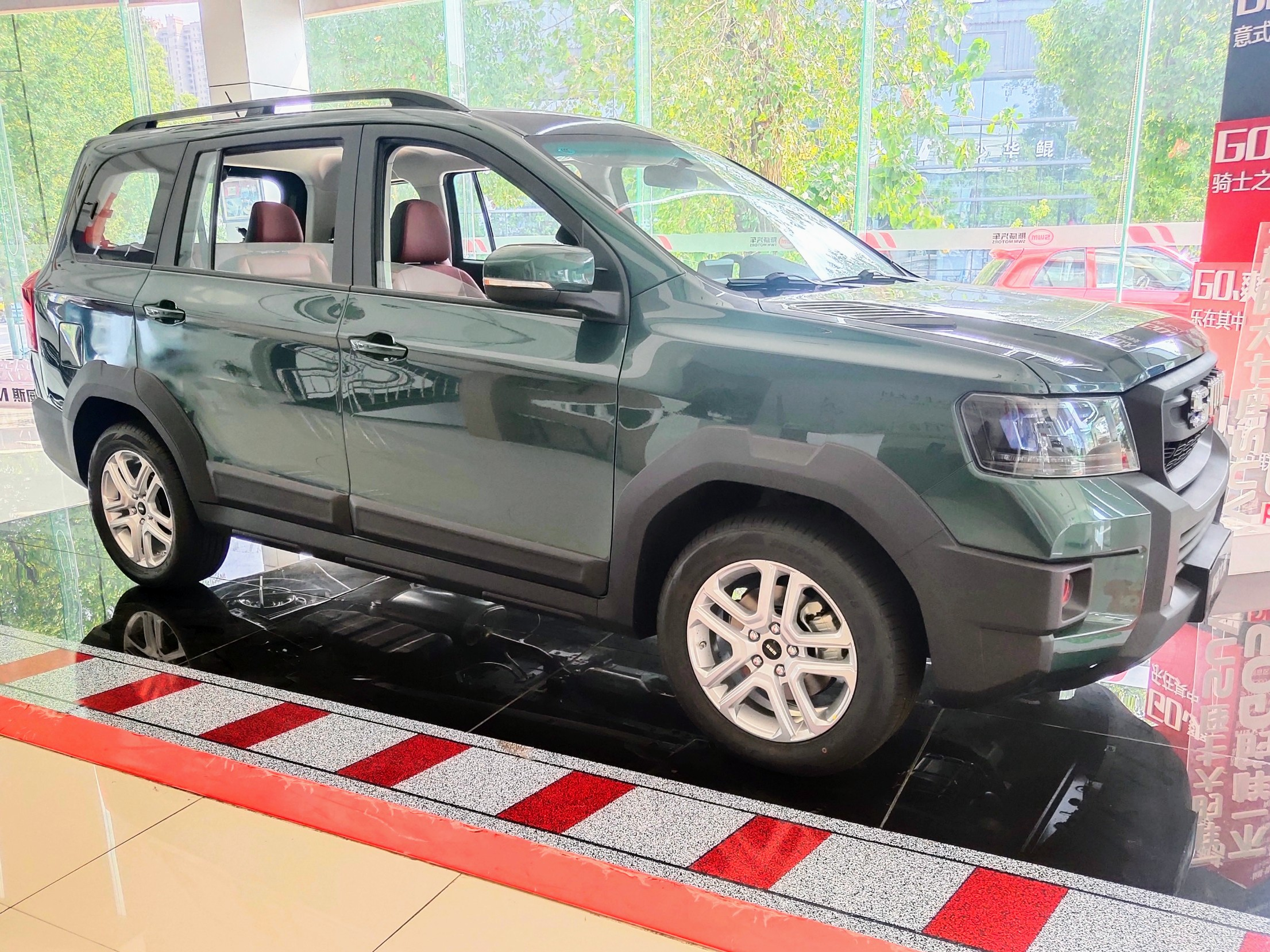
SWM Tiger

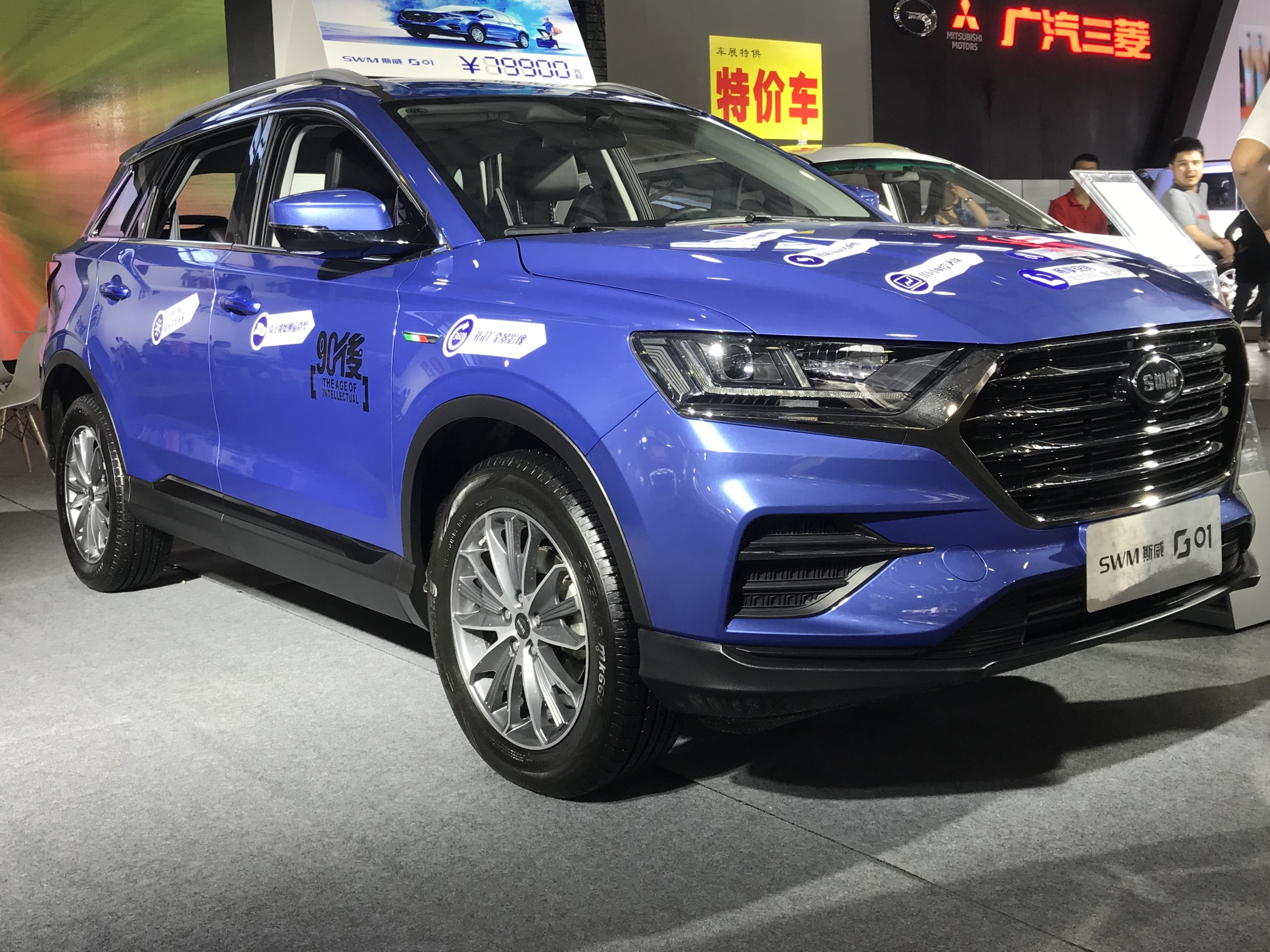
SWM G01

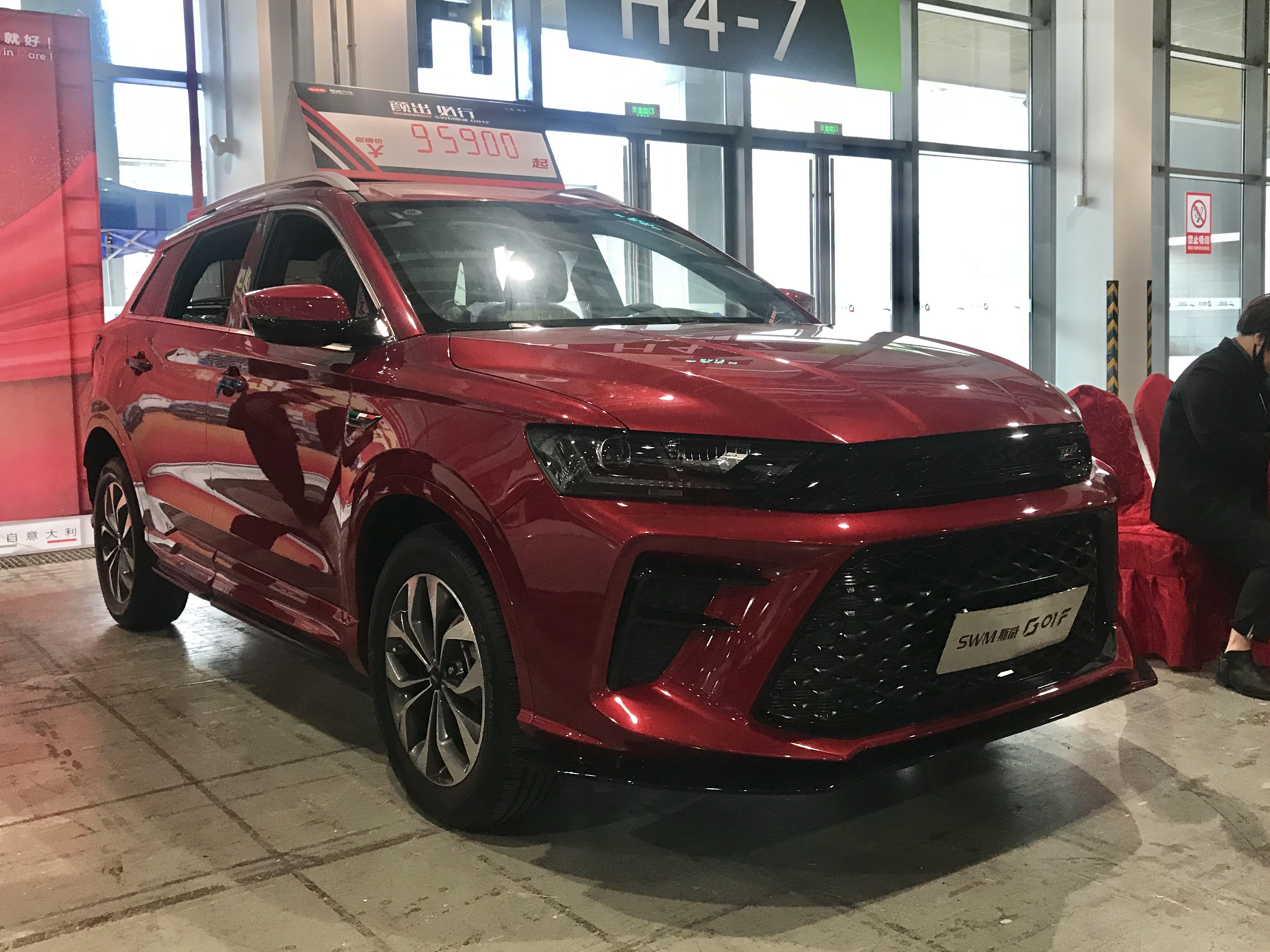
SWM G01 F-edition

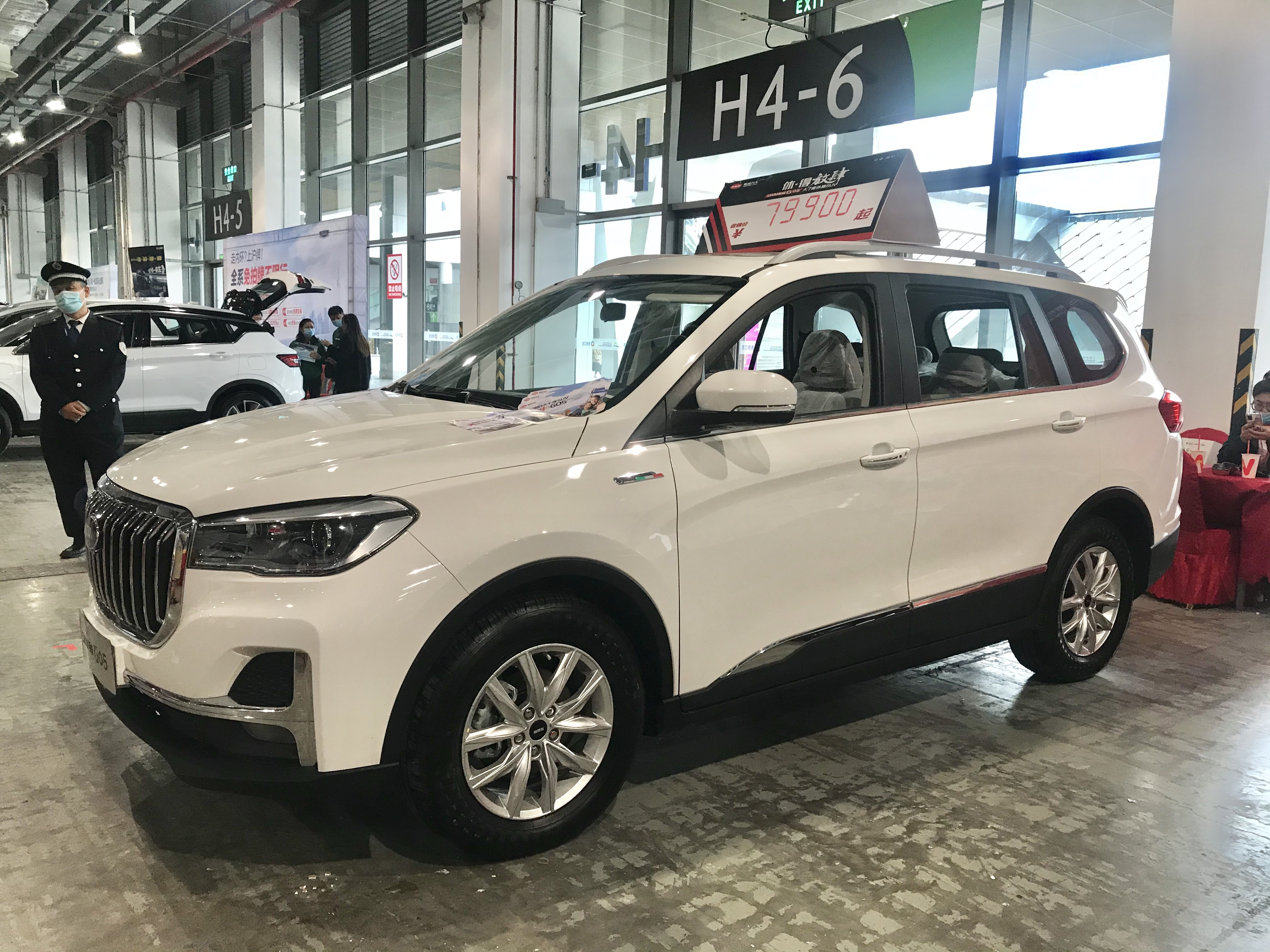
SWM G05

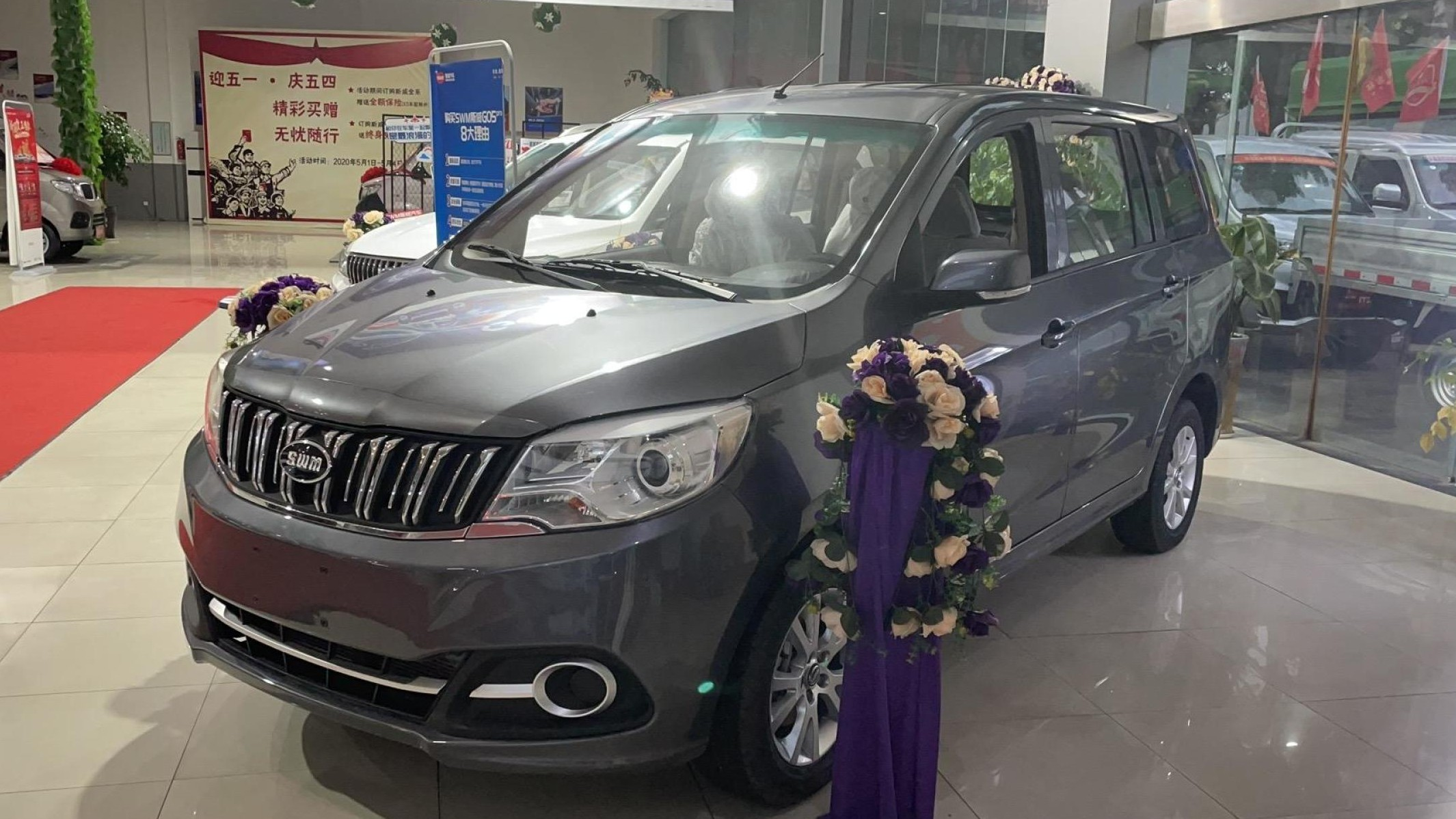
SWM X2

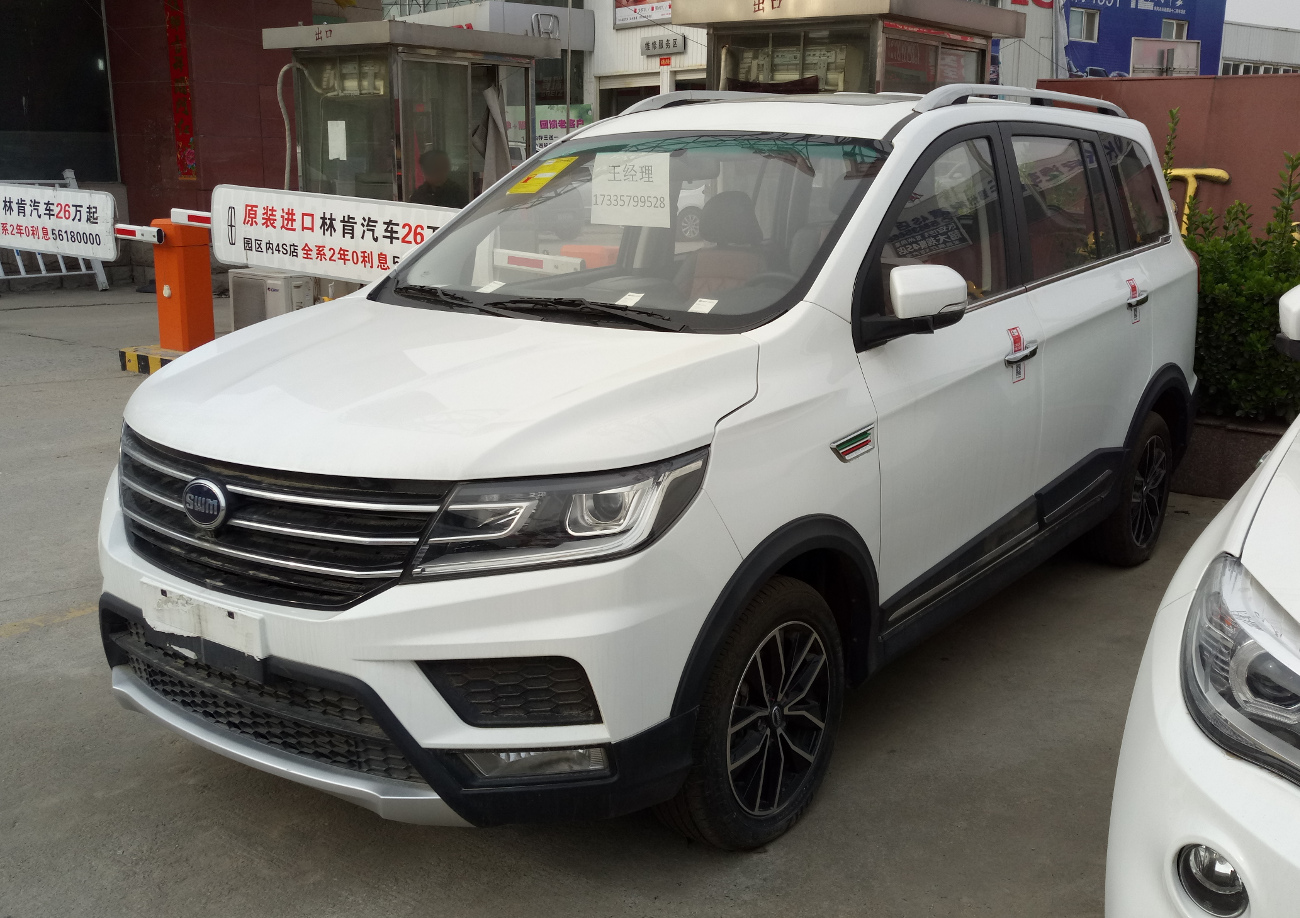
SWM X3

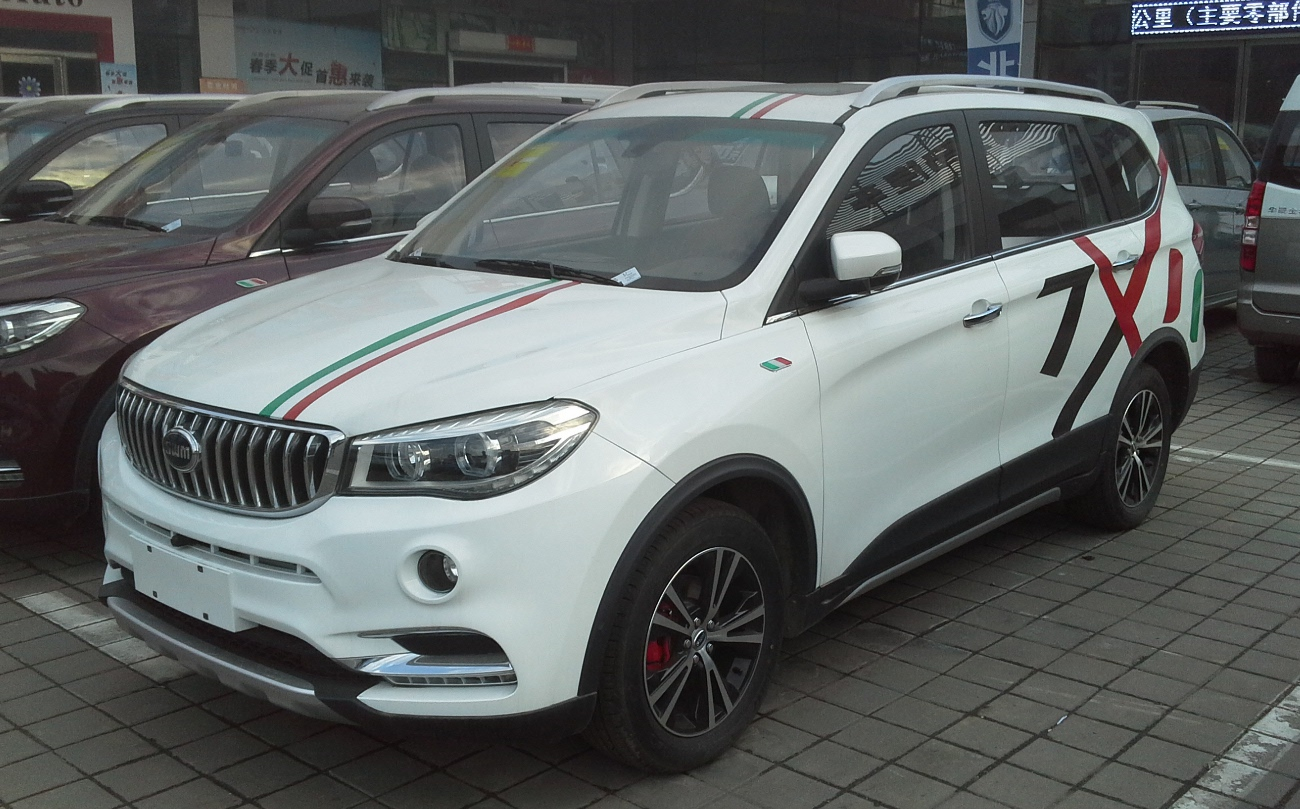
SWM X7
