= SWM X7 =

7-seater crossover manufactured by SWM

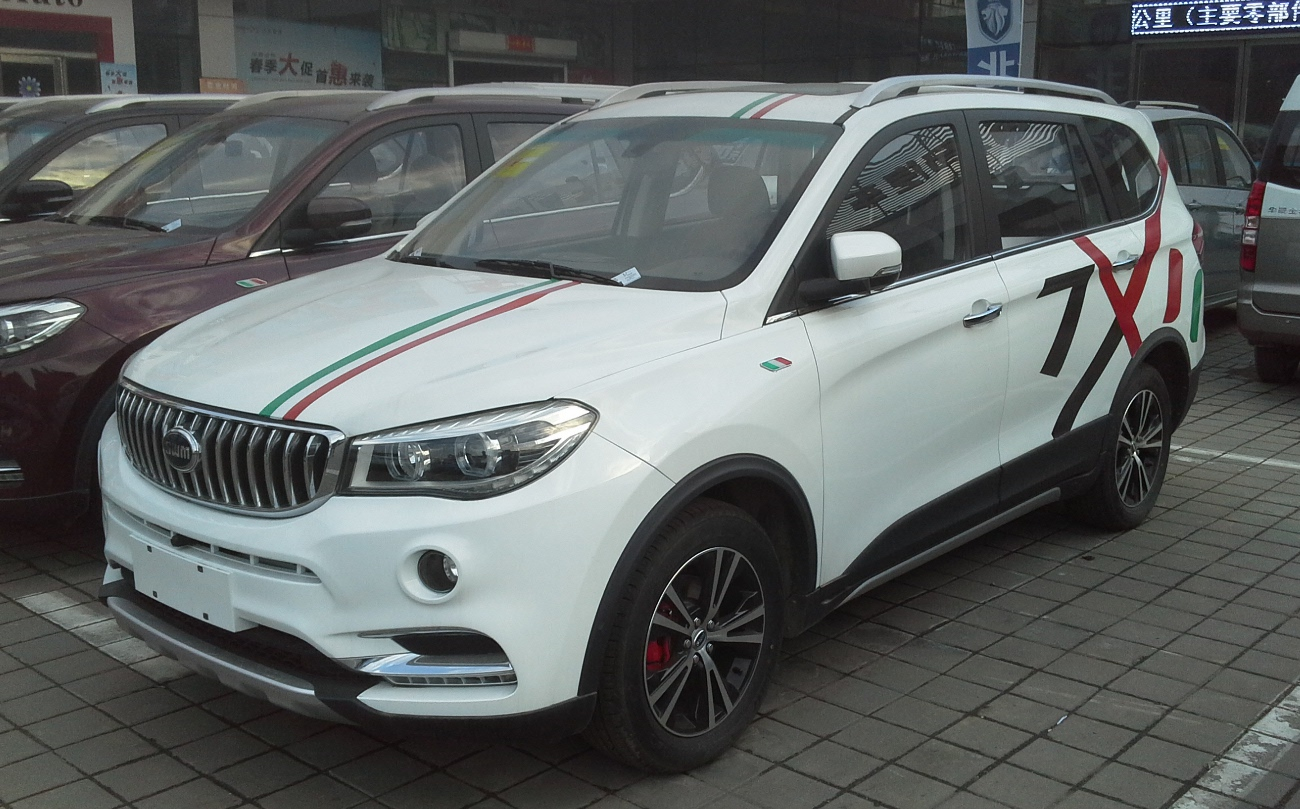

Overview
- Manufacturer: SWM (automobiles)
- Production: 2016–2021
- Assembly: Chongqing, China

Body and chassis
- Class: Mid-size crossover SUV
- Body style: 5-door SUV

Powertrain
- Engine: 1.8 L I4 (petrol); 1.5 L I4 turbo (petrol)
- Transmission: 5-speed manual 6-speed automatic

Dimensions
- Wheelbase: 2,750 mm (108.3 in)
- Length: 4,710 mm (185.4 in)
- Width: 1,855 mm (73.0 in)
- Height: 1,770 mm (69.7 in)

Chronology
- Successor: SWM G05

The SWM X7 is a mid-size crossover SUV that is manufactured by the Chinese manufacturer SWM (automobiles) of Brilliance Shineray. The SWM X7 was launched in December 2016 in China.

== Overview ==
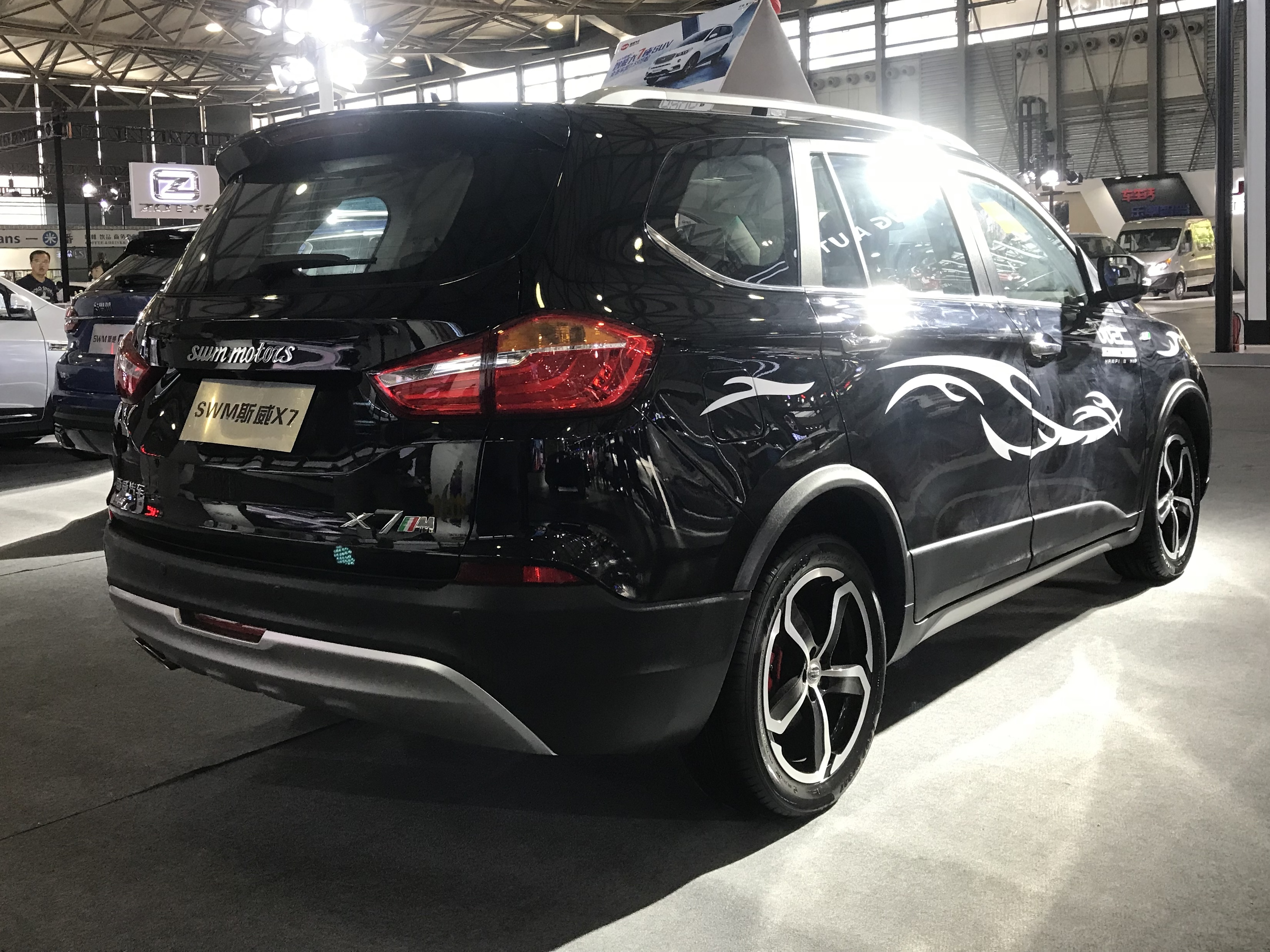
SWM X7 rear

Formerly known as the SWM X5 during development phase, there are two engines available for the SWM X7, including a 1.5-liter turbo producing 156 hp and 230 Nm, and a 1.8-liter producing 137 hp and 258 Nm, both mated to either a five-speed manual gearbox or a CVT. Prices of the SWM X7 ranges from 85,900 to 118,900 yuan.
