= SWM X3 =

Chinese mid-size crossover SUV

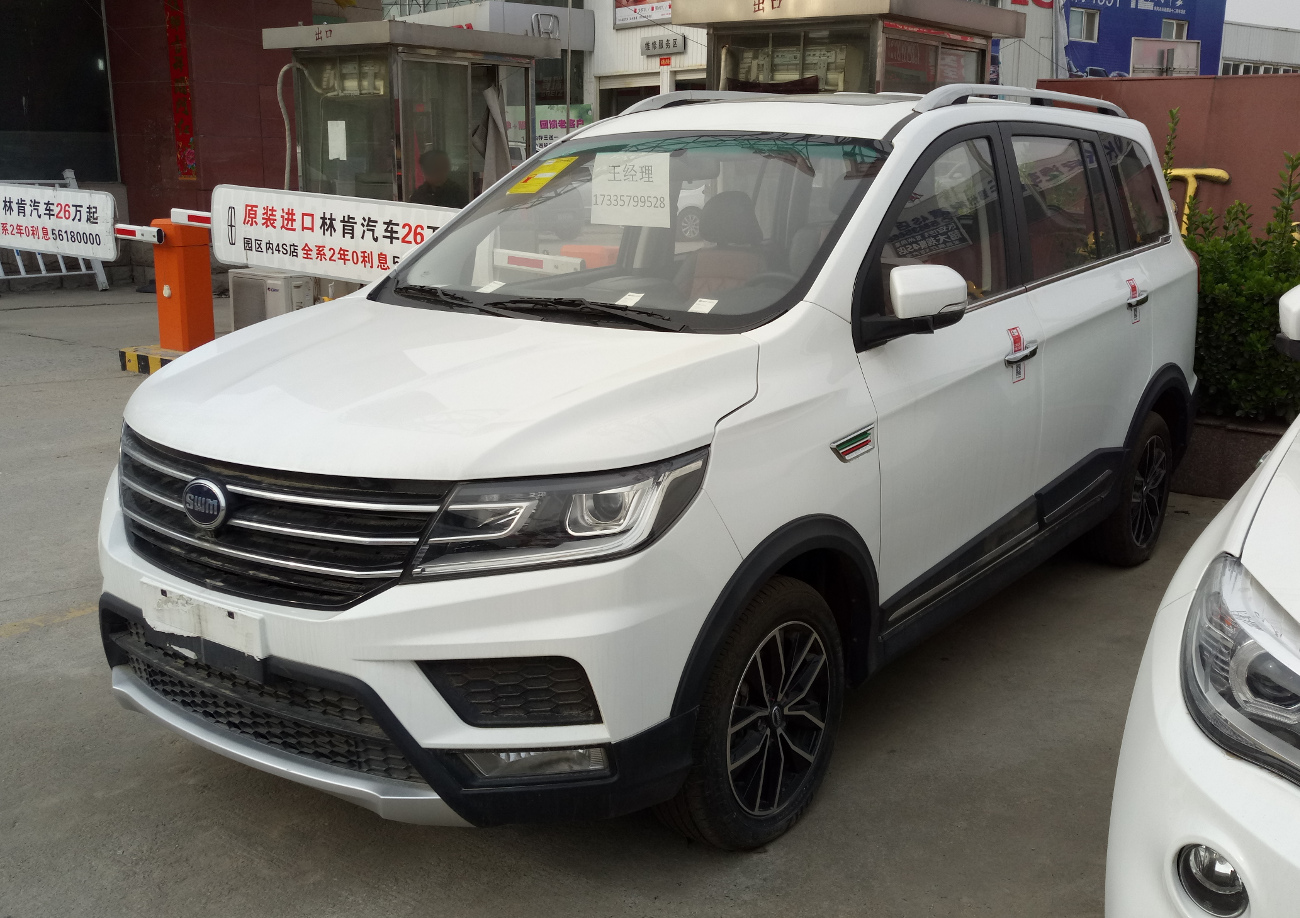

Overview
- Manufacturer: SWM (automobiles)
- Production: 2018–2023
- Assembly: Chongqing, China

Body and chassis
- Class: Mid-size crossover SUV
- Body style: 5-door SUV
- Related: Jinbei 750; SWM X2

Powertrain
- Engine: 1.5 L I4 (petrol); 1.5 L I4 turbo (petrol)
- Transmission: 5-speed manual

Dimensions
- Wheelbase: 2,725 mm (107.3 in)
- Length: 4,615 mm (181.7 in)
- Width: 1,790 mm (70.5 in)
- Height: 1,790 mm (70.5 in)

Chronology
- Successor: SWM Tiger

The SWM X3 is a mid-size crossover SUV that is manufactured by the Chinese manufacturer SWM (automobiles) of Brilliance Shineray. The SWM X3 was launched on the 2017 Shanghai Auto Show in China.

== Overview ==
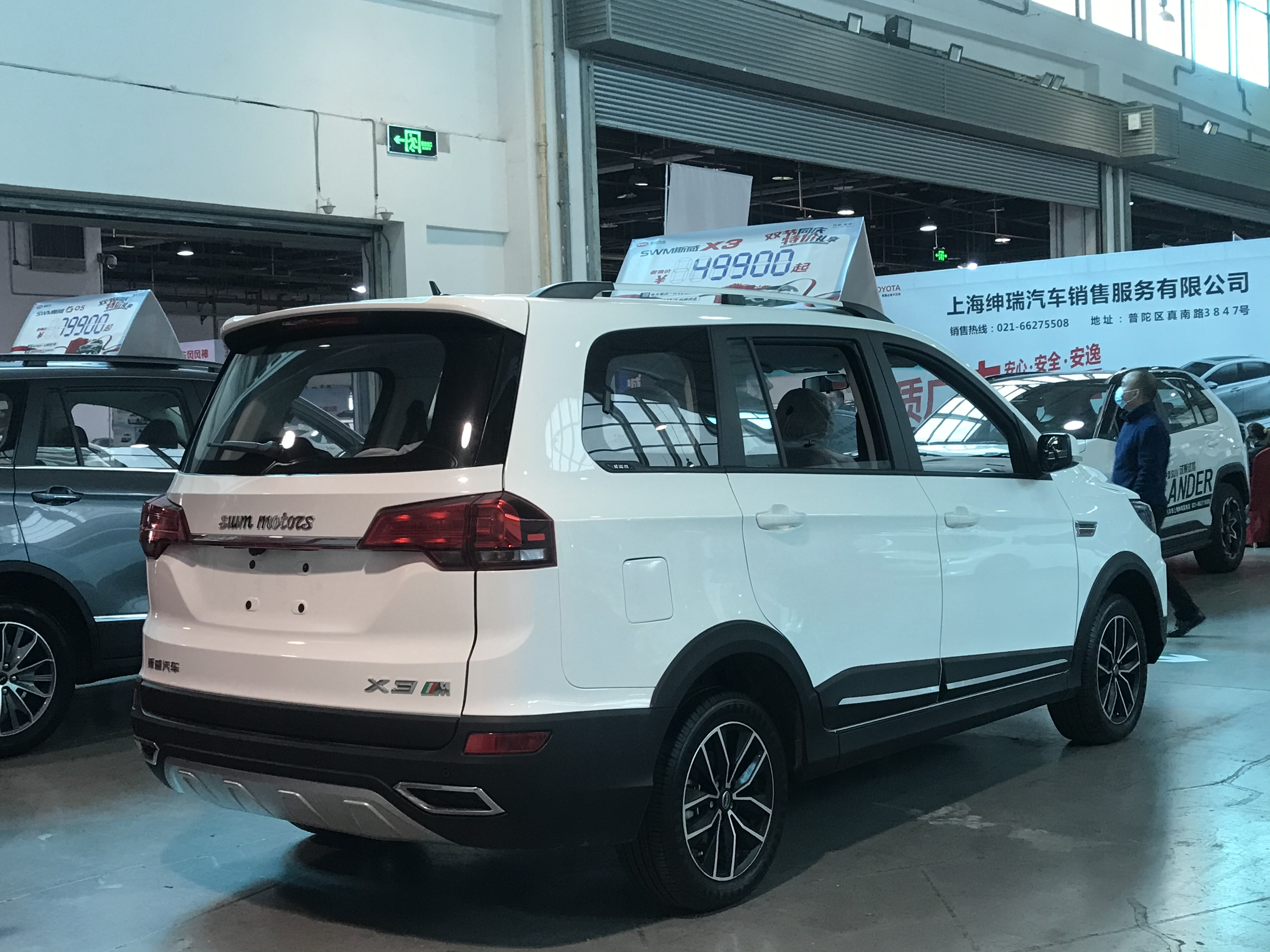
SWM X3 rear

Developed based on the same platform as the SWM X2, which is a rebadged Jinbei 750, the power of the SWM X3 comes from 3 engine options including the 1.5 liter DG15 engine, DG16 engines and the turbo DG15T engine developed by Brilliance. Prices of the SWM X3 ranges from 55,000 yuan to 82,900 yuan.
