= SWM G01 =

Chinese compact crossover SUV

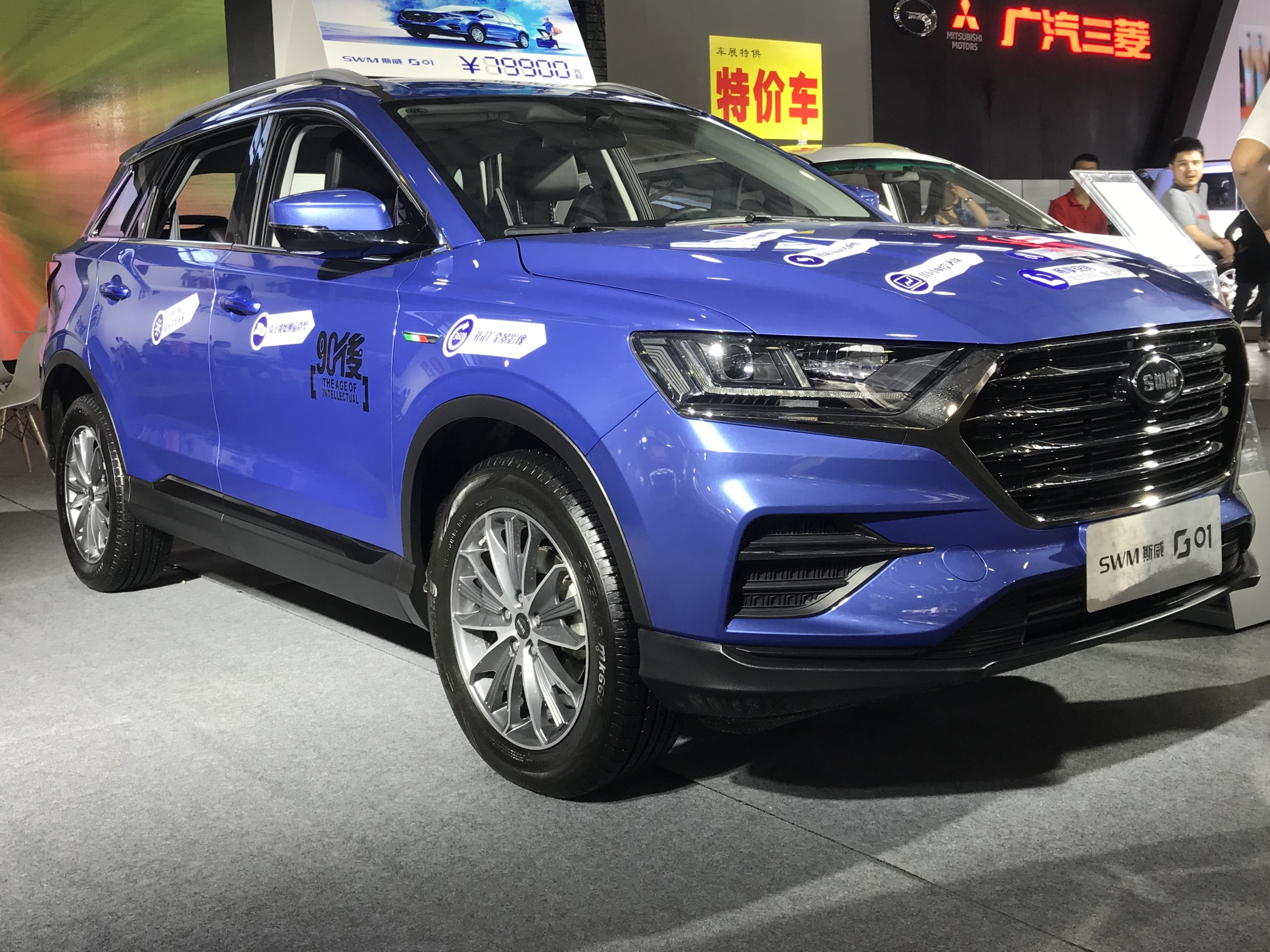
- SWM G01

Overview
- Manufacturer: Shineray Group
- Also called: {{ubl
- Production: 2018–present
- Assembly: Chongqing, China; Tehran, Iran (Safe Khodro, 2020–2021); Bam, Kerman, Iran (KMC, since 2023); Kaliningrad, Russia (Avtotor)
- Designer: Sotiris Kovos

Body and chassis
- Class: Compact crossover SUV
- Body style: 5-door SUV

Powertrain
- Engine: 1.5 L I4 turbo (petrol)
- Transmission: 6-speed manual; 6-speed automatic

Dimensions
- Wheelbase: 2,750 mm (108.3 in)
- Length: 4,610 mm (181.5 in)
- Width: 1,855 mm (73.0 in)
- Height: 1,725 mm (67.9 in)
- Kerb weight: 1,560 kg (3,440 lb)

The SWM G01 is a compact crossover SUV that is manufactured by the Chinese manufacturer SWM Motors of Shineray Group. The SWM G01 debuted in April 2018 in Italy, and was launched on the 2018 Beijing Auto Show in China.

In Italy, Cirelli Motor Company sells the G01F under the name Cirelli 3 Sport.

== Overview ==
The power of the SWM G01 comes from a 1.5-litre turbocharged engine developed by Brilliance, capable of producing 156 hp (116 kW; 158 PS) and a top speed of 180 km/h (112 mph). In terms of the chassis, the G01 features front and rear independent suspension. Prices of the G01 ranges from 79,900 yuan to 147,900 yuan.

The model name is an obvious reference to BMW X3 (G01), which, for the Chinese market, is made by SWM's joint venture partner, Brilliance, through another of its joint venture, BMW Brilliance.

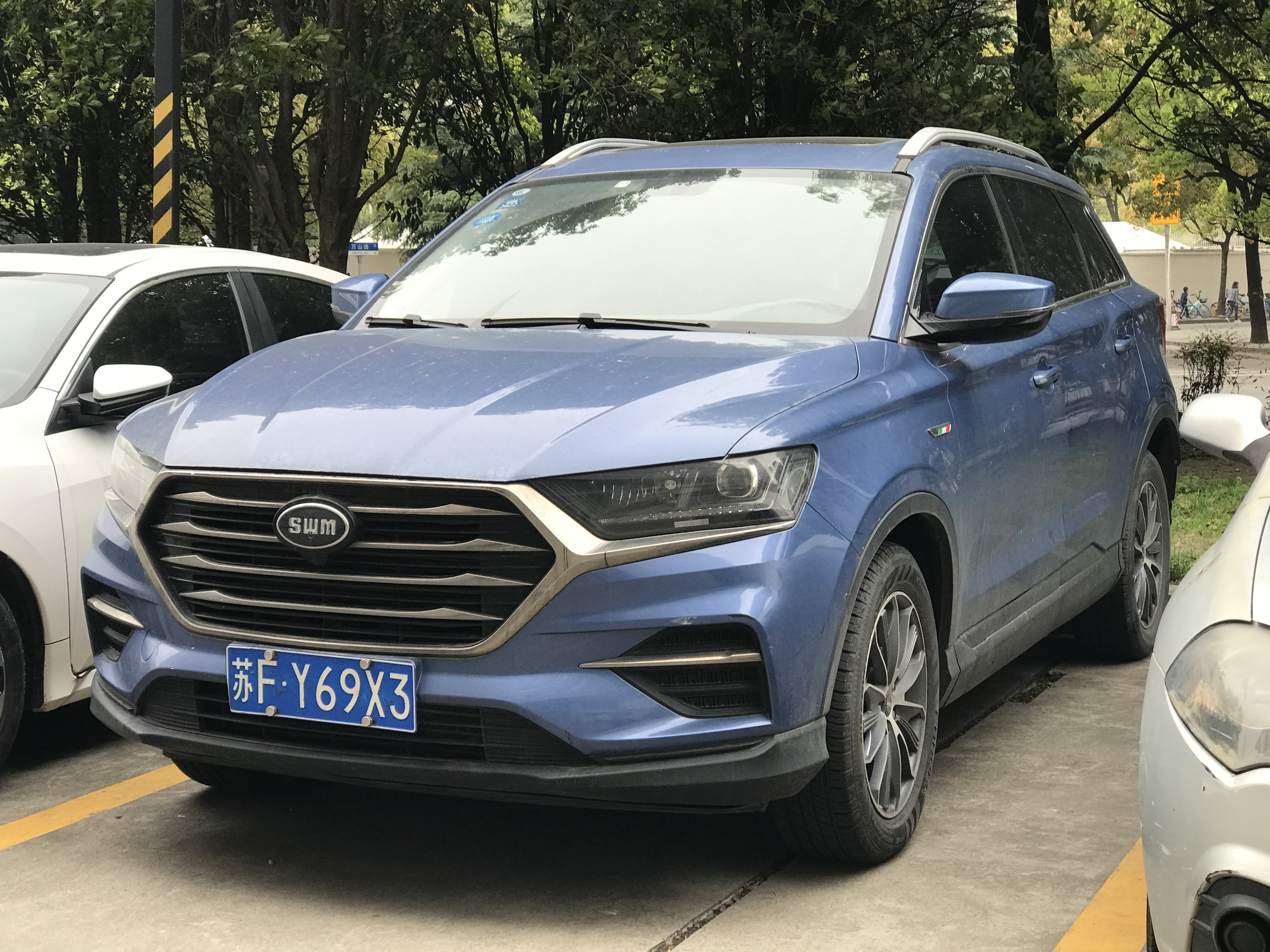
2018 SWM G01 front

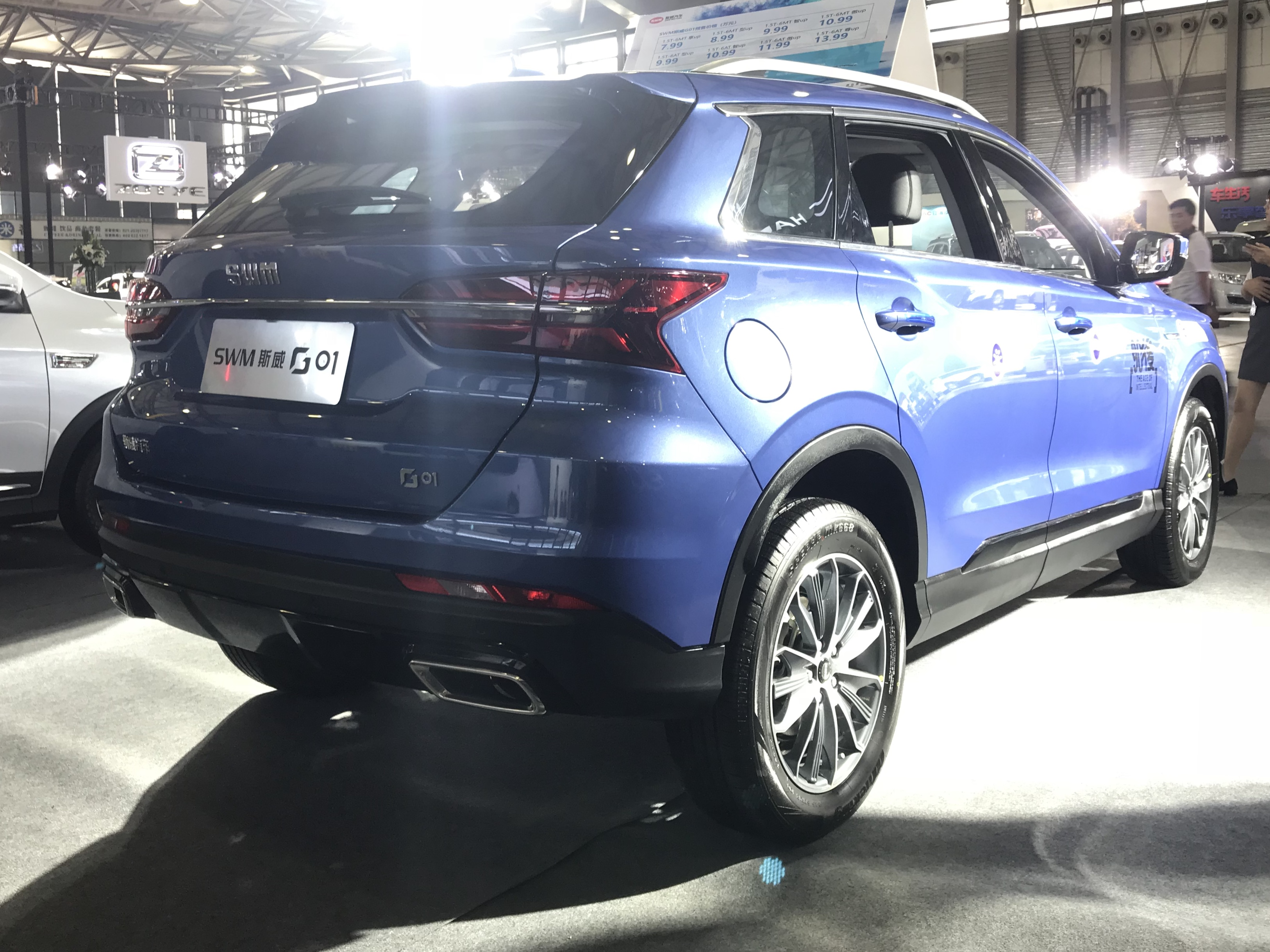
2018 SWM G01 rear

A performance variant called the G01 F-Edition was launched in May 2019, featuring a body kit and a completely restyled front end. The SWM G01 F is powered by 1.5-litre inline-4 turbocharged engine producing 115 kW (154 hp; 156 PS) and a peak torque of 220 N⋅m (162 lb⋅ft; 22 kg⋅m). The G01 F is priced at 95,900 to 125,900 yuan (~US$13,825-US$18,150) in Chinese market.

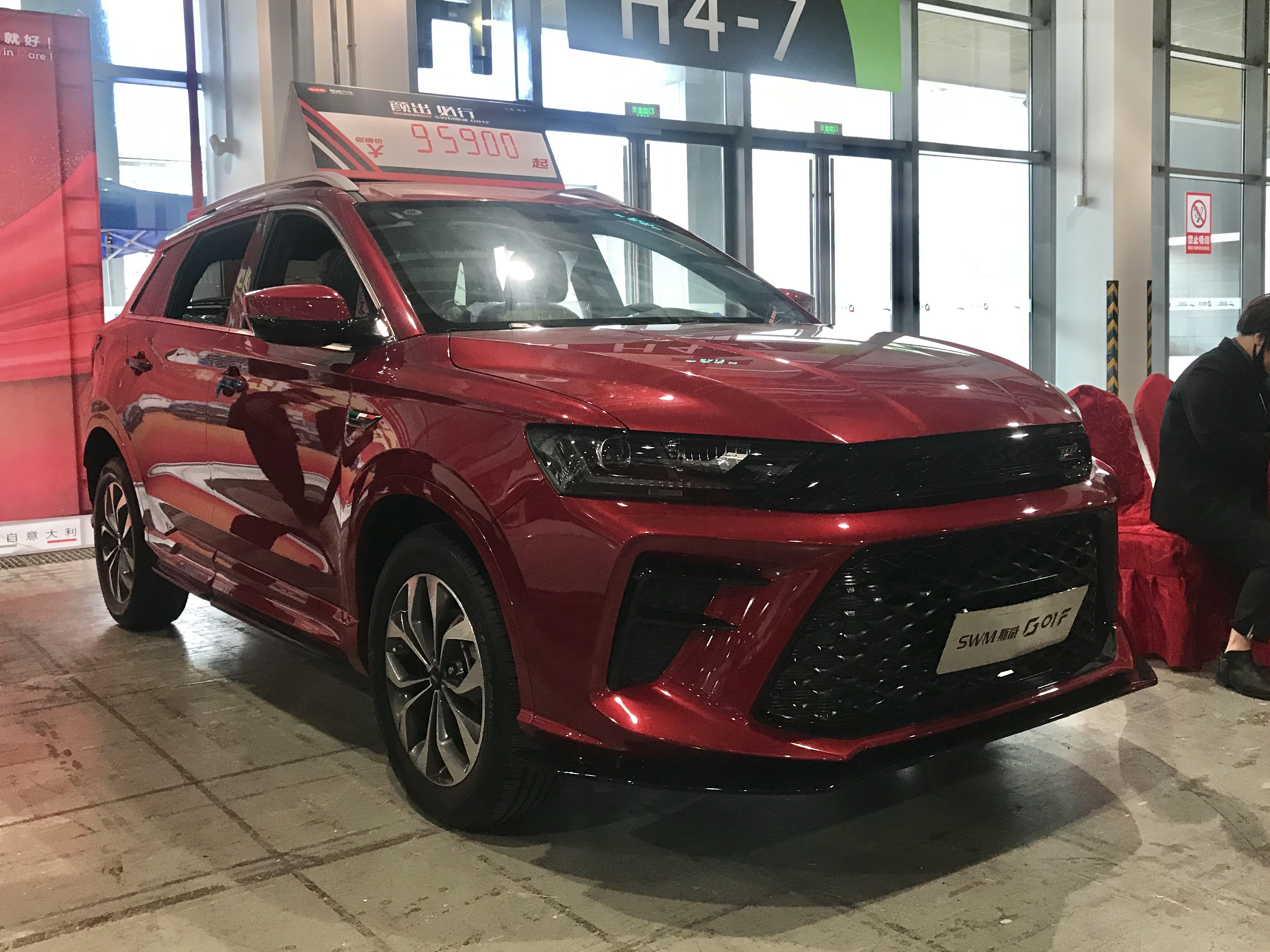
SWM G01 F-edition front

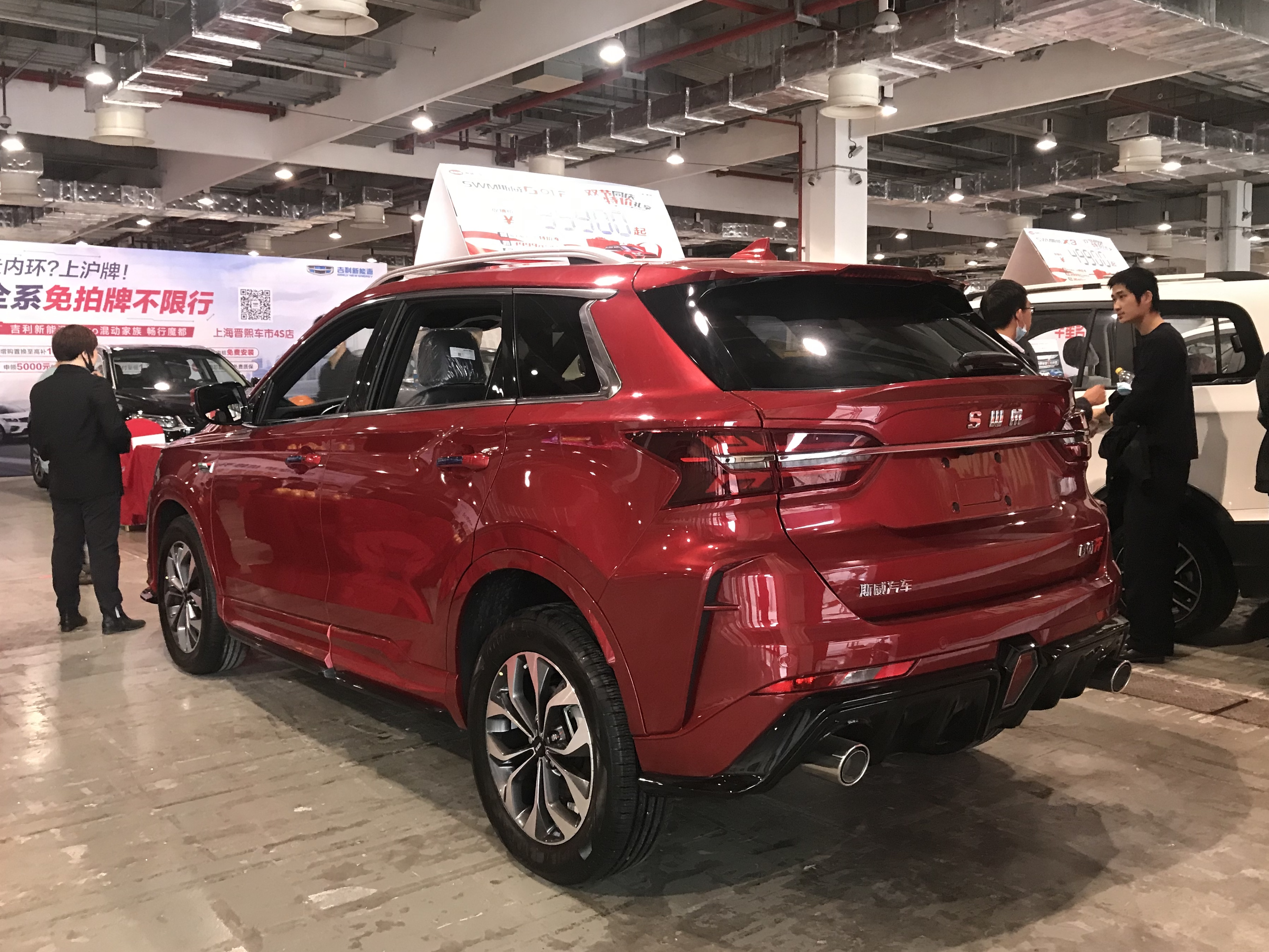
SWM G01 F-edition rear

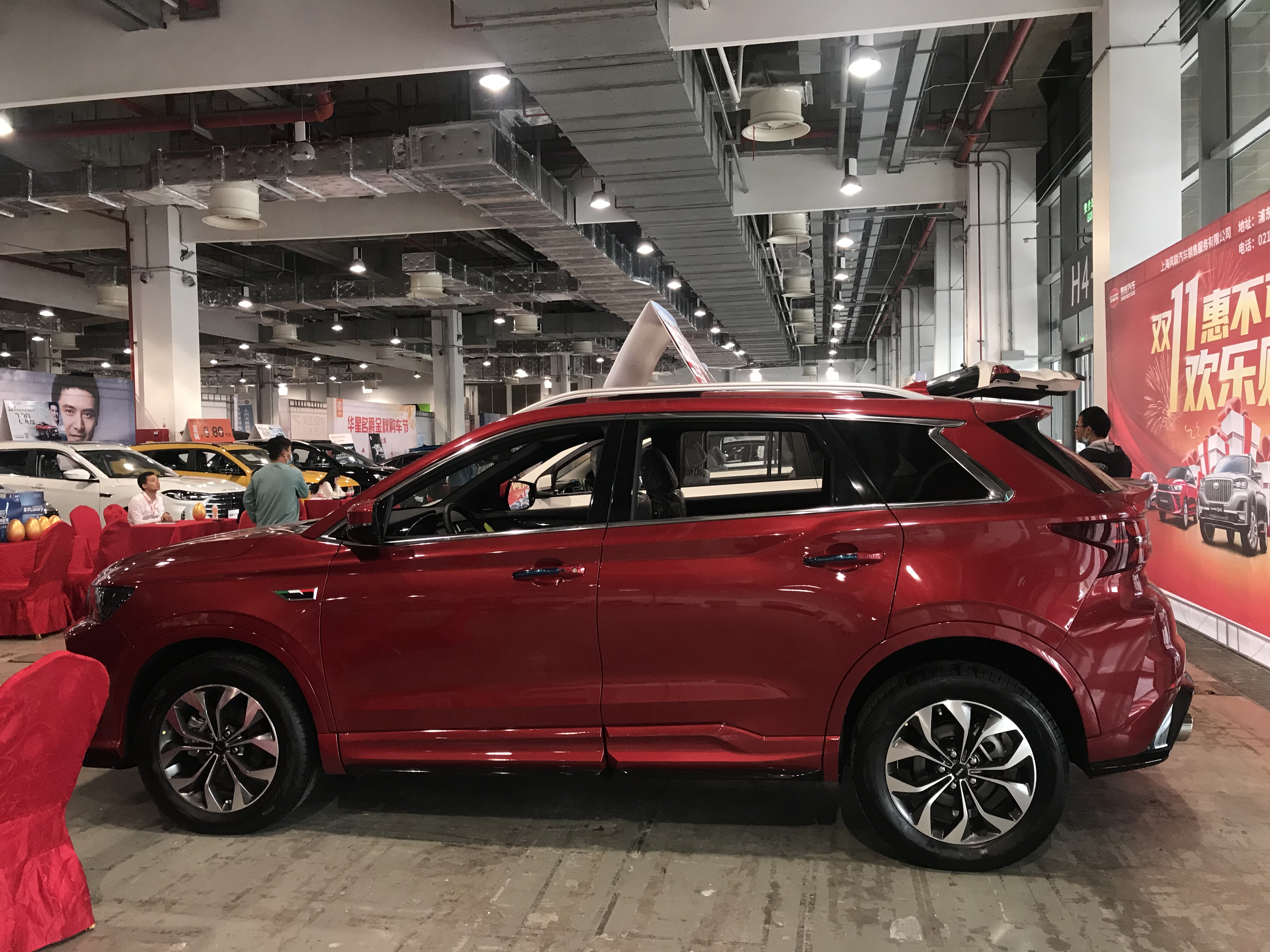
SWM G01 F-edition side

== Sales ==
Year	China		
Year	G01	G01 FF	Total
2023	217	—	217
2024	2	114	116
2025	59	—	59
