= SWM G05 =

7-seater crossover manufactured by SWM

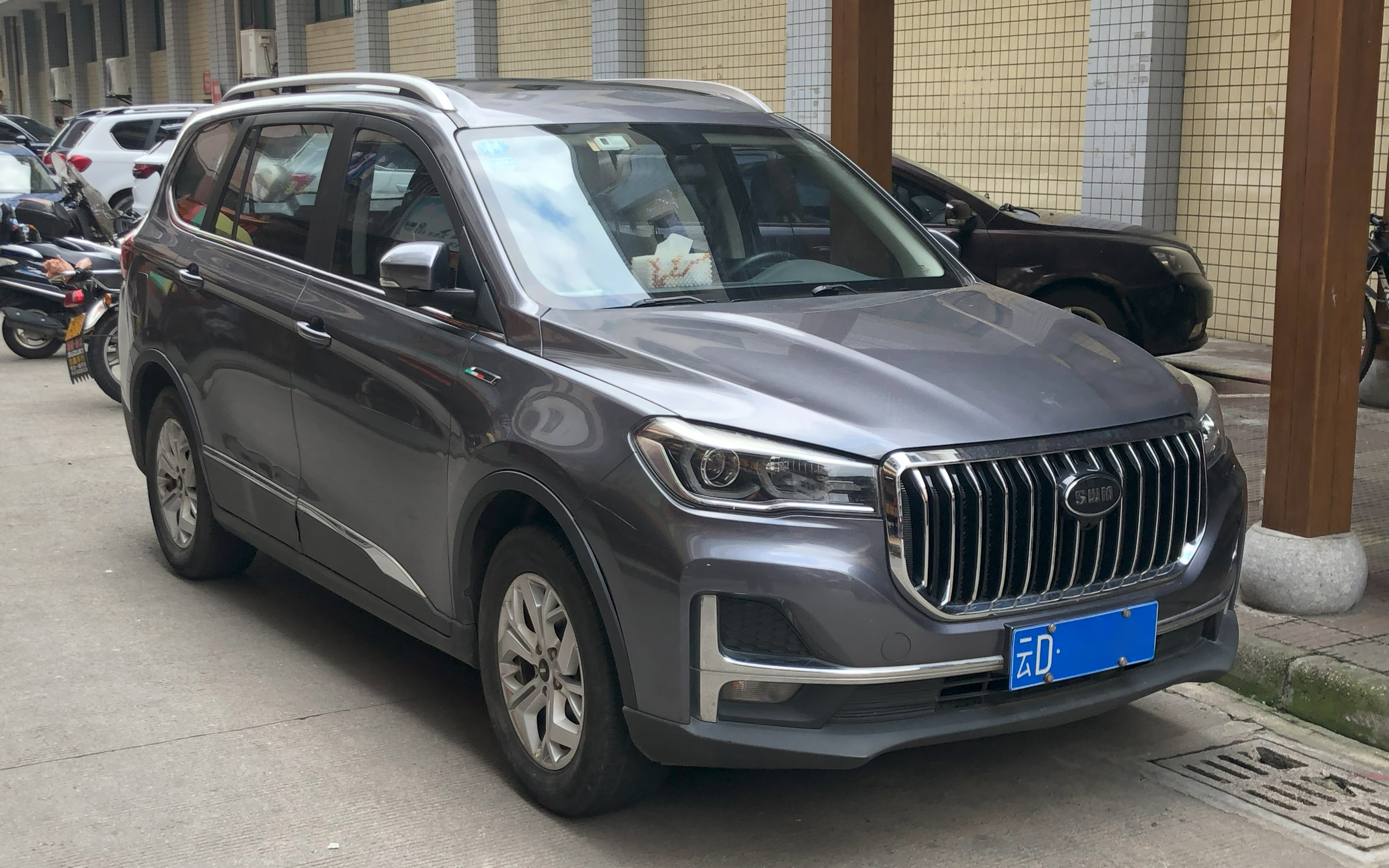

Overview
- Manufacturer: SWM (automobiles)
- Also called: Cirelli 6 (Italy)
- Production: 2019–present
- Assembly: Chongqing, China

Body and chassis
- Class: Mid-size crossover SUV
- Body style: 5-door station wagon
- Related: SWM X7

Powertrain
- Engine: 2.0 L I4 (petrol); 1.5 L I4 turbo
- Transmission: 5-speed manual 6-speed automatic

Dimensions
- Wheelbase: 2,750 mm (108.3 in)
- Length: 4,710 mm (185.4 in)
- Width: 1,855 mm (73.0 in)
- Height: 1,770 mm (69.7 in)

Chronology
- Predecessor: SWM X7

The SWM G05 is a 7-seater mid-size crossover SUV that is manufactured by the Chinese manufacturer SWM (automobiles) of Brilliance Shineray. The SWM G05 market launch was in September 2019 in China.

== Overview ==
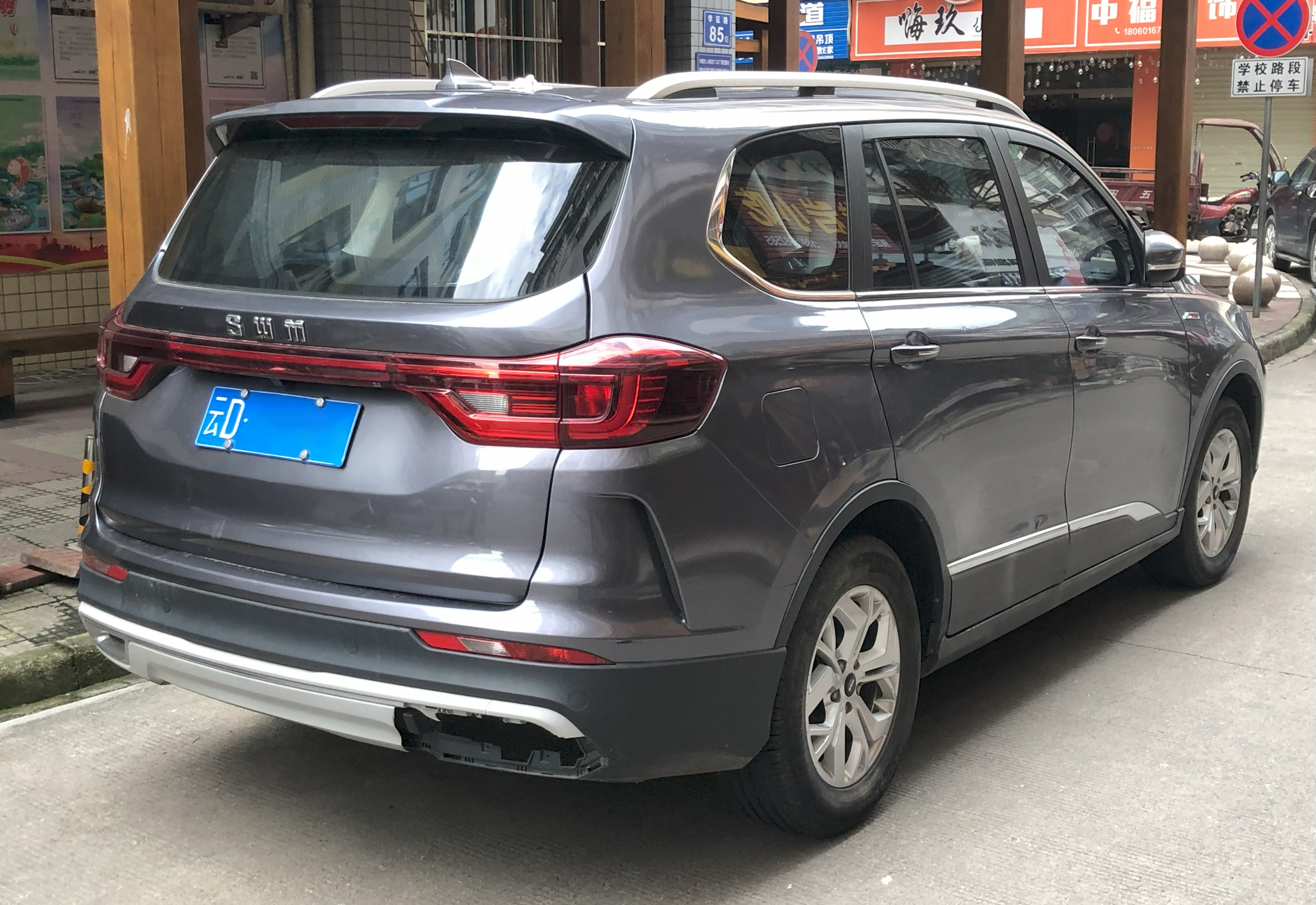
SWM G05 rear

SWM Motors debuted its SWM G05 crossover SUV model at 2019 Chongqing Auto Show on June 5, 2019. SWM G05 is the first 7-seat mid-size crossover SUV to be built on the G platform of SWM Motors, which was an updated old platform that spawned the SWM X7. There are two engines available for the SWM X7, including a 1.5 liter turbo engine producing 154hp (115kW) and 220nm and a 2.0 liter engine, with the 1.5 liter turbo engine models mated to either a 6-speed manual gearbox or a 6-speed automatic gearbox, while the 2.0 liter engine models are only available with the 6-speed manual gearbox. Prices of the SWM X7 ranges from 69,900 yuan to 103,000 yuan (~US$9,774 – US$14,403).

The SWM G05 is equipped with the E-go 3.0 car networking system, including intelligent voice command system, updated UI interface, instrument display system with LCD screens. As for safety specifications, the G05 features ADAS driving assistance system, side air curtains, and 360 panoramic high-definition display.

=== SWM G05 Pro ===
The SWM G05 Pro is the facelift launched in February 2021. the SWM G05 Pro features a slightly redesigned exterior and uses a 1.5-liter turbocharged engine with 230 nm of torque. The fuel consumption of new engine has been reduced by 10% compared to the previous one.

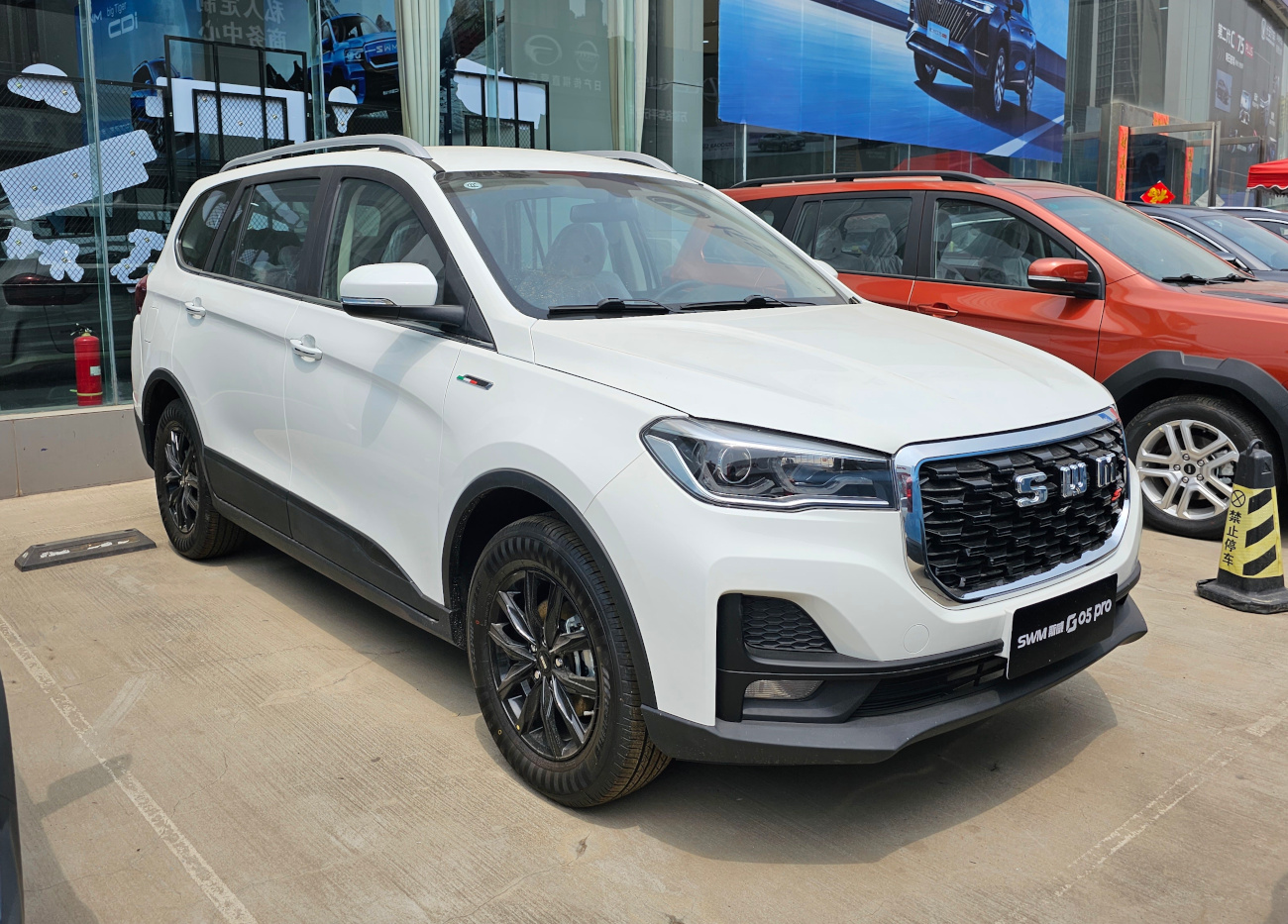
SWM G05 Pro

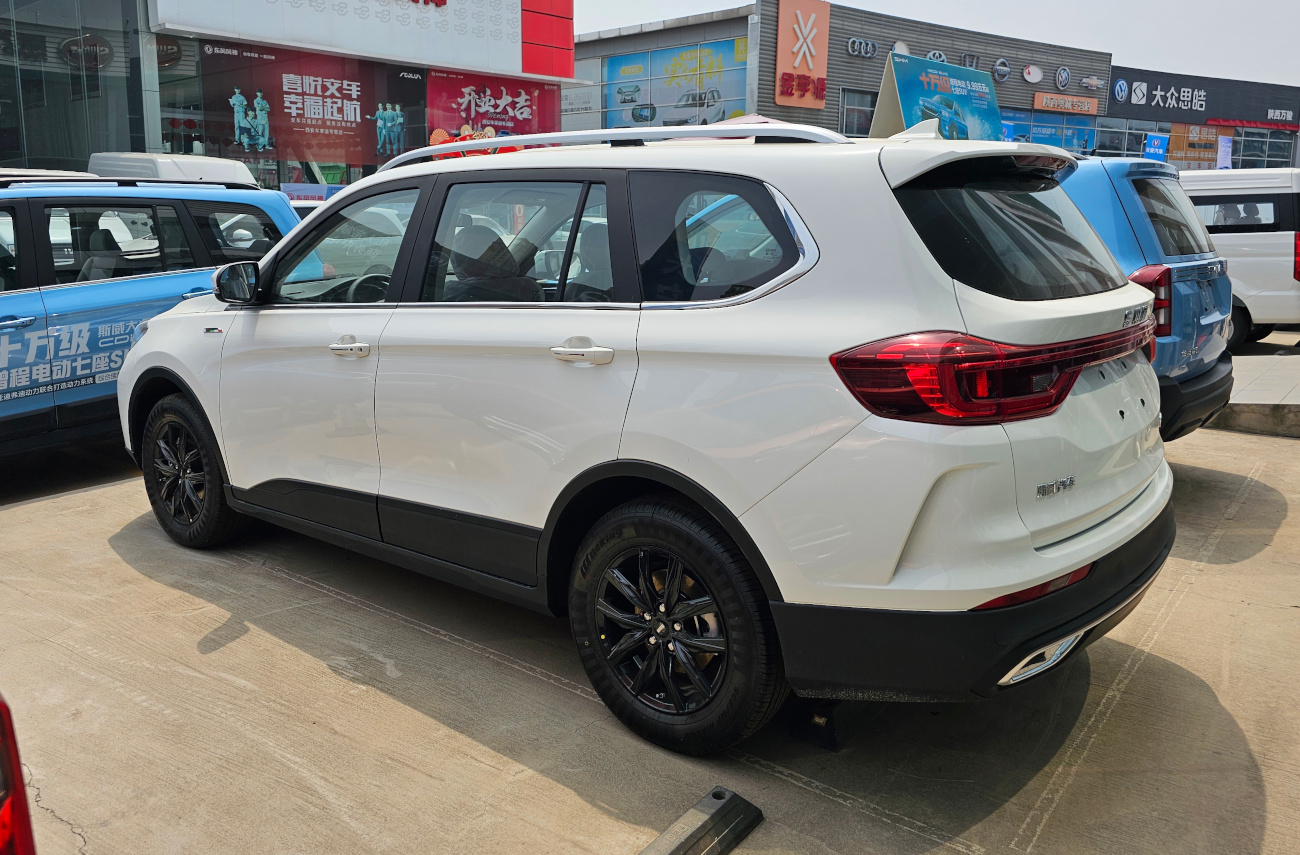
Rear view

== Sales ==
Year	China
2023	425
2024	235
2025	45
