= Jinbei 750 =

Chinese MPV

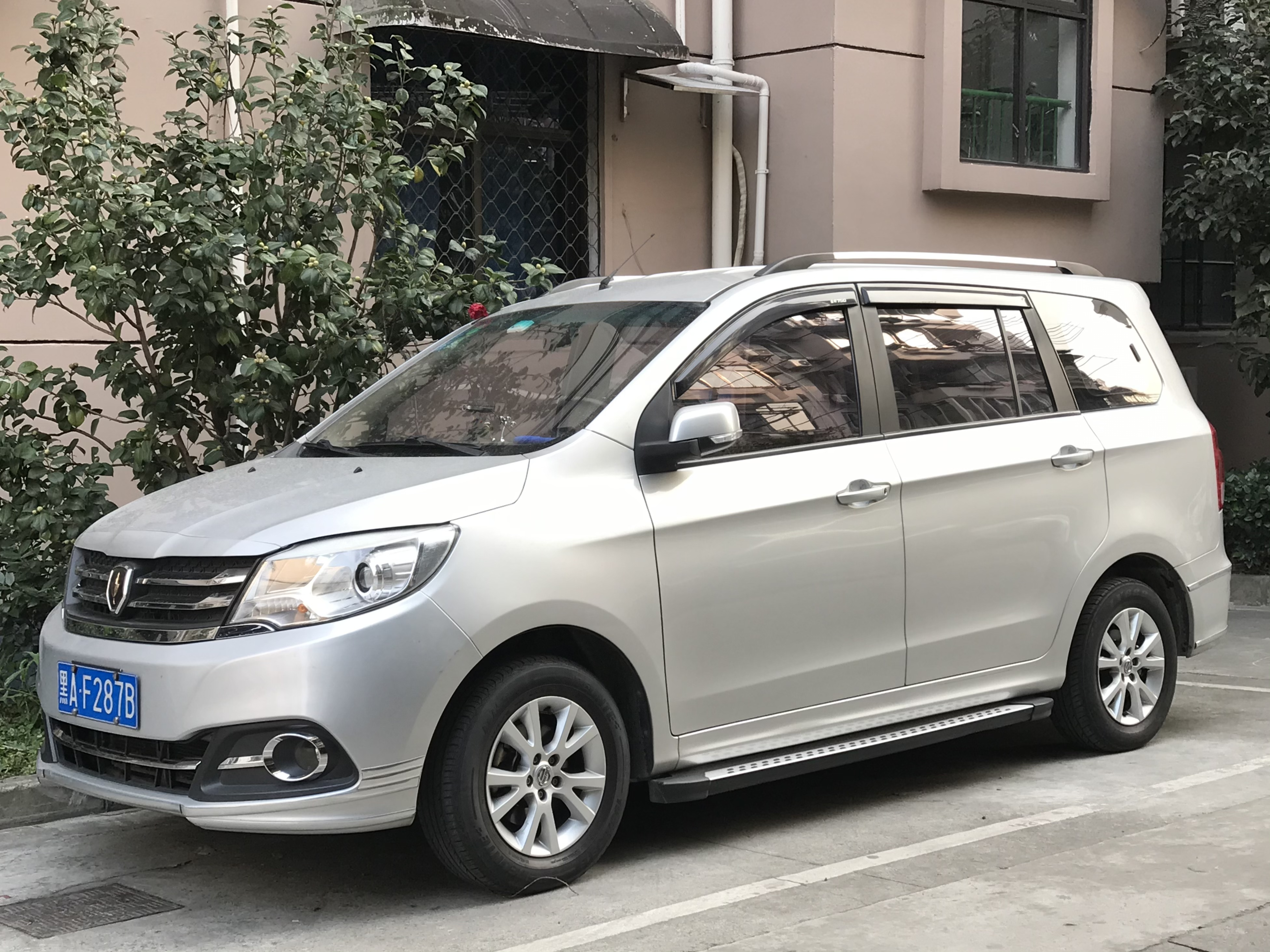

Overview
- Manufacturer: Jinbei (marque)
- Also called: SWM X2
- Production: 2015–2018 (Jinbei 750); 2019–2021 (SWM X2)
- Assembly: China

Body and chassis
- Class: MPV
- Body style: 5-door minivan
- Layout: Front-engine, front-wheel-drive
- Related: SWM X3

Powertrain
- Engine: 1.6L four-cylinder petrol engine
- Transmission: 5-speed manual

Dimensions
- Wheelbase: 1,760 mm (69 in)
- Length: 4,515 mm (177.8 in)
- Width: 1,750 mm (69 in)
- Height: 1,795 mm (70.7 in)
- Curb weight: 1,480 kg (3,260 lb)

Chronology
- Successor: SWM Tiger

The Jinbei 750 is a compact MPV produced by Jinbei from 2015. The model was also rebadged as the SWM X2 from 2019.

== Overview ==
The Jinbei 750 debuted in April 2015 during the 2015 Shanghai Auto Show, and was launched on the China car market immediately with prices ranging from 53,800 yuan to 63,800 yuan ($8,660-$10,270).

The Jinbei 750 is a seven-seat MPV with a 2-2-3 configuration, and is currently only available with a 1.5 liter four-cylinder petrol engine producing 112hp and 147nm of torque, mated to a five-speed manual. A 136hp 1.5 liter turbo engine was launched later.

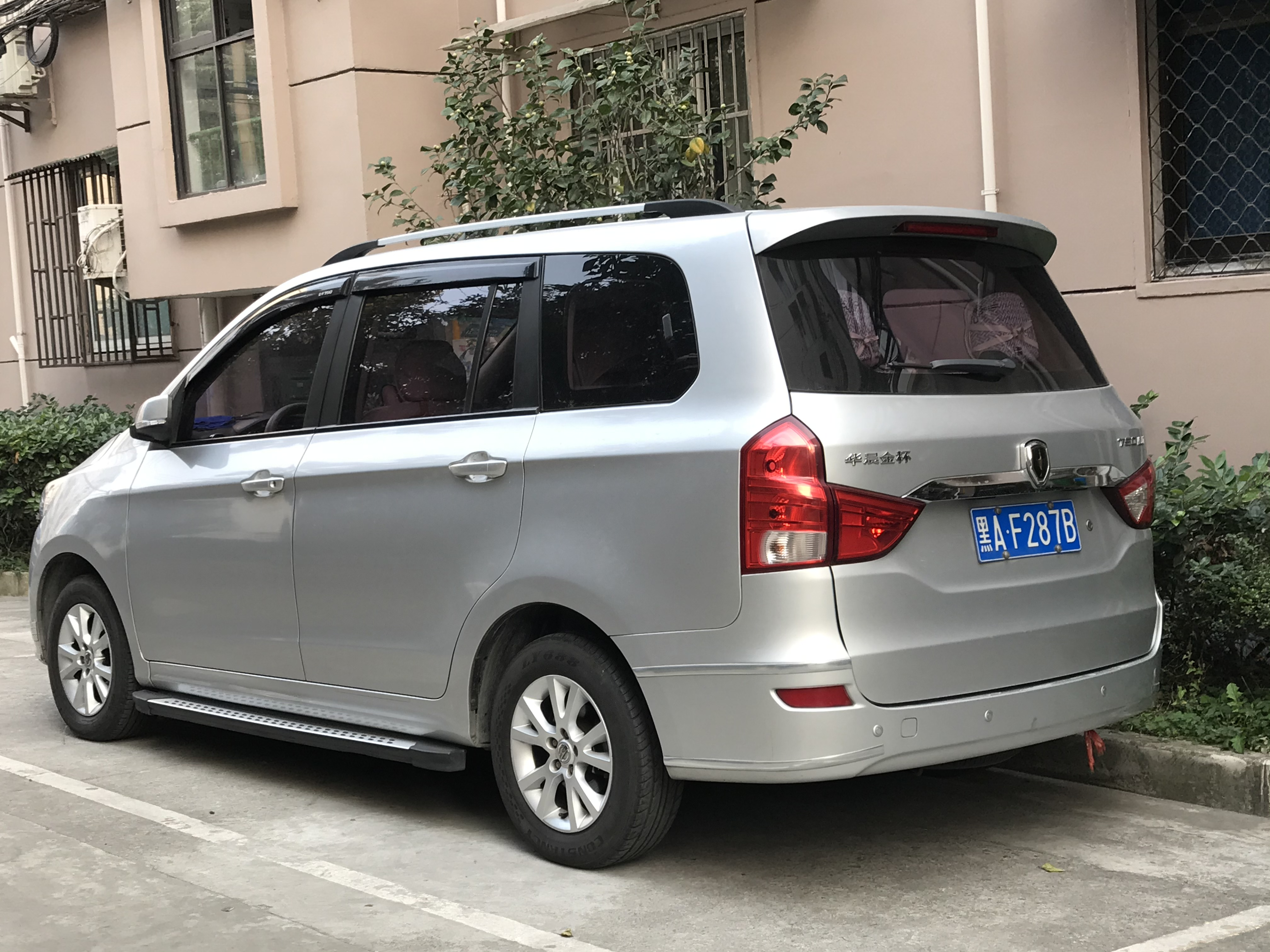
Jinbei 750 rear quarter

== SWM X2 ==
The SWM X2 is a compact MPV launched in 2019 and produced by Chinese automaker SWM, and is essentially a rebadged Jinbei 750 with redesigned front grilles.

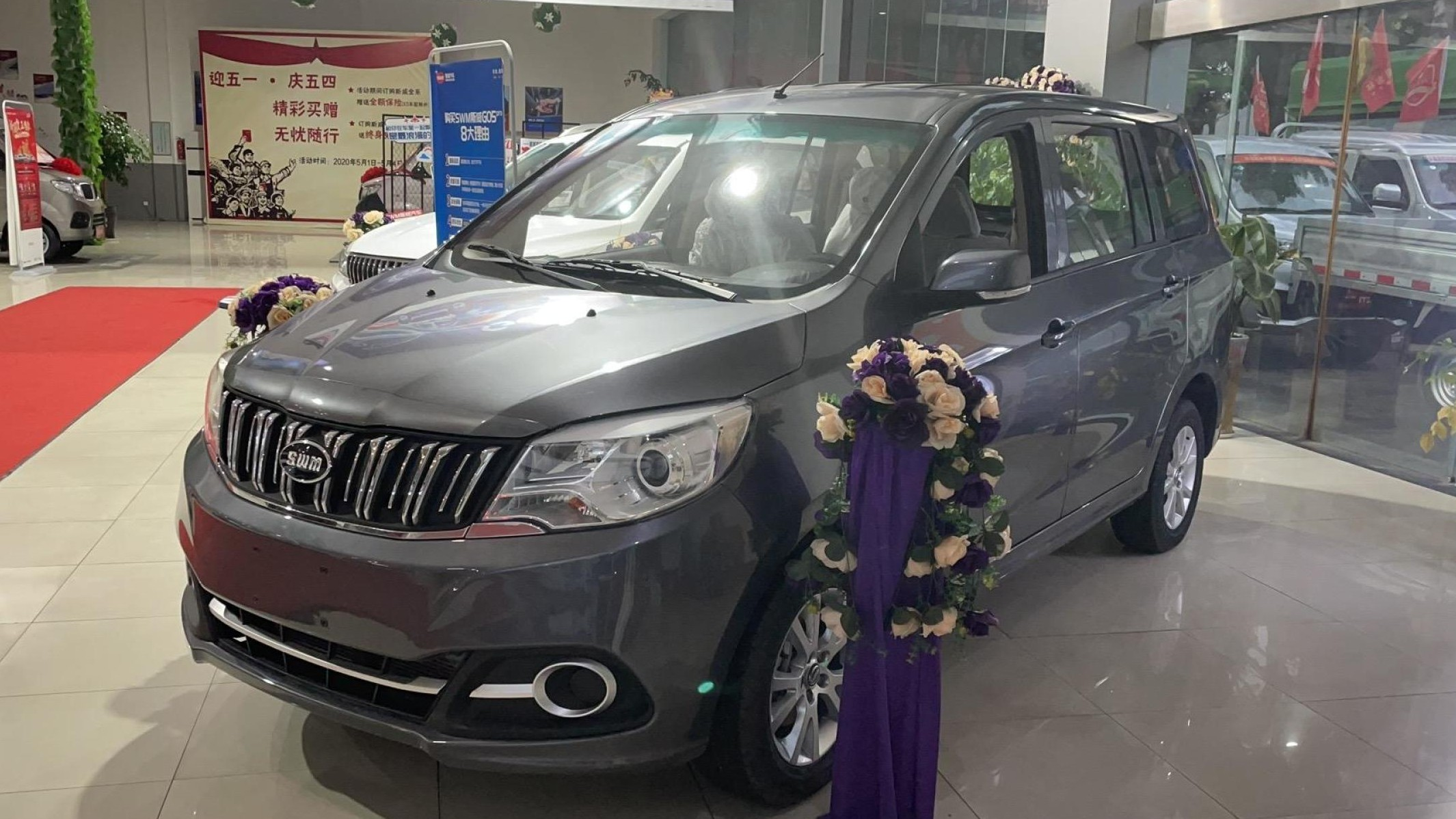
SWM X2 (front)

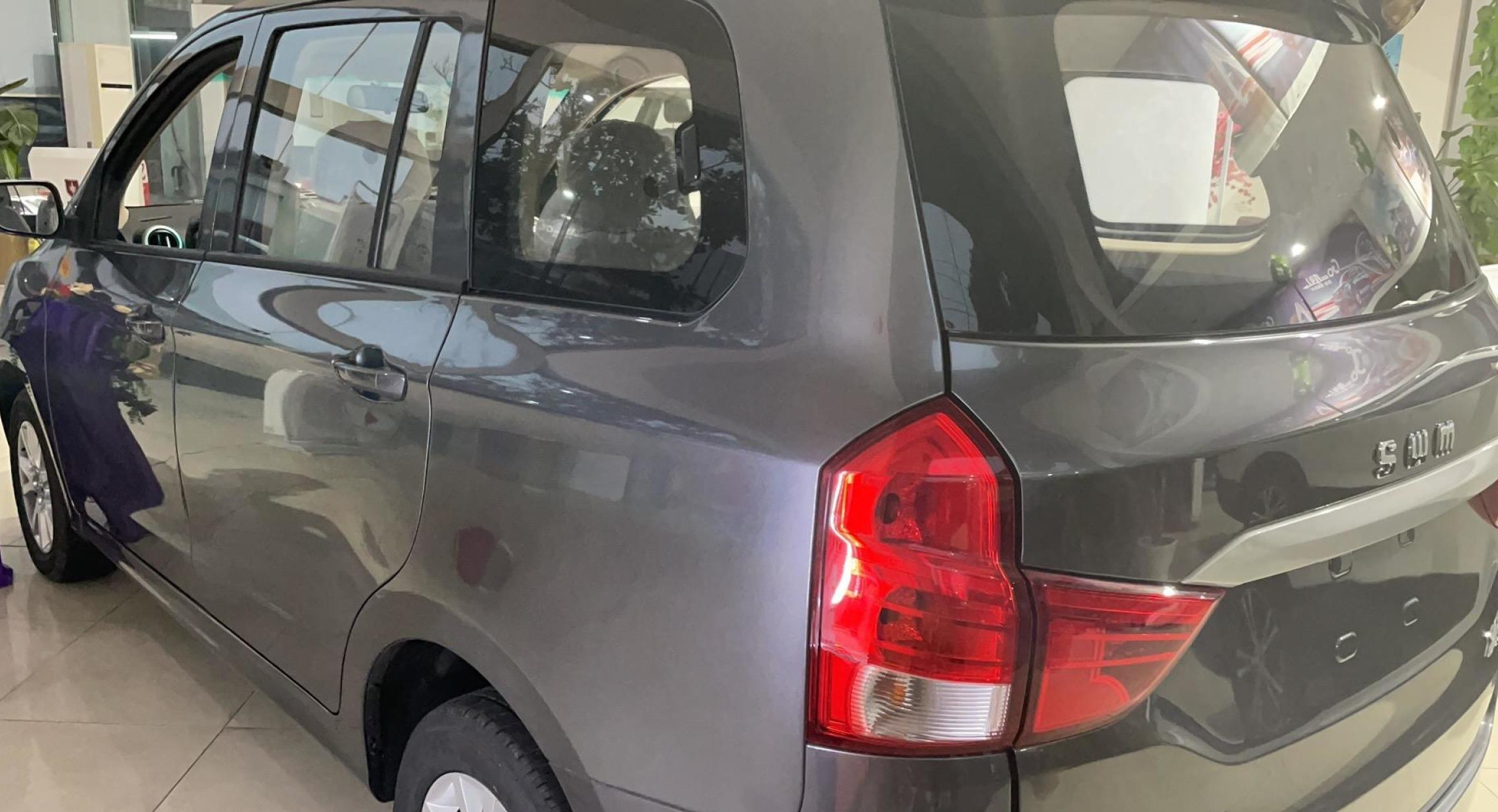
SWM X2 (rear details)

== See also ==
- Jinbei (marque)
