= V5 =

V5, V-5, or V.5 may refer to:

== Electronics and software ==
- CATIA V5, a multi-platform software suite
- Hanlin v5 Mini, an electronic book reading device
- Volari V5, a video card

== Military ==
- V-5, the United States Navy's Naval Aviation Cadet program during 1935–1968

== Music ==
- V5 (group), musical group
- V.5 (mixtape), the tenth mixtape by American rapper Lloyd Banks

== Science and technology ==
- ITU-T V.5, a withdrawn telecommunication recommendation
- V_{5}, the EKG electrode placed in the fifth intercostal space in the mid-clavicular line
- V5 interface, a family of telephone network protocols defined by ETSI
- V5, the middle temporal visual area of the visual cortex

== Transportation ==
=== Automobiles ===
- Brilliance V5, a Chinese compact SUV
- Changan Alsvin V5, a subcompact sedan
- Chery V5, a Chinese compact MPV
- FAW Vita V5, a Chinese subcompact sedan
- GreenWheel EV V5, a Chinese subcompact electric crossover
- Mushtaq V5, a commercial van produced under Dewan Group
- Soueast V5, a Chinese compact sedan
- Kuayue Chana V5, a Chinese microvan

=== Aviation ===
- Bailey V5 paramotor, a British paramotor

=== Engines ===
- V5 engine, a V form engine with five cylinders
- Bailey V5 engine

=== Documentation ===
- V5 form, or the V5C, for vehicle registration in the United Kingdom

== See also ==
- 5V (disambiguation)
