= Volari V3 =

The Volari V3 is a video card manufactured by XGI Technology.

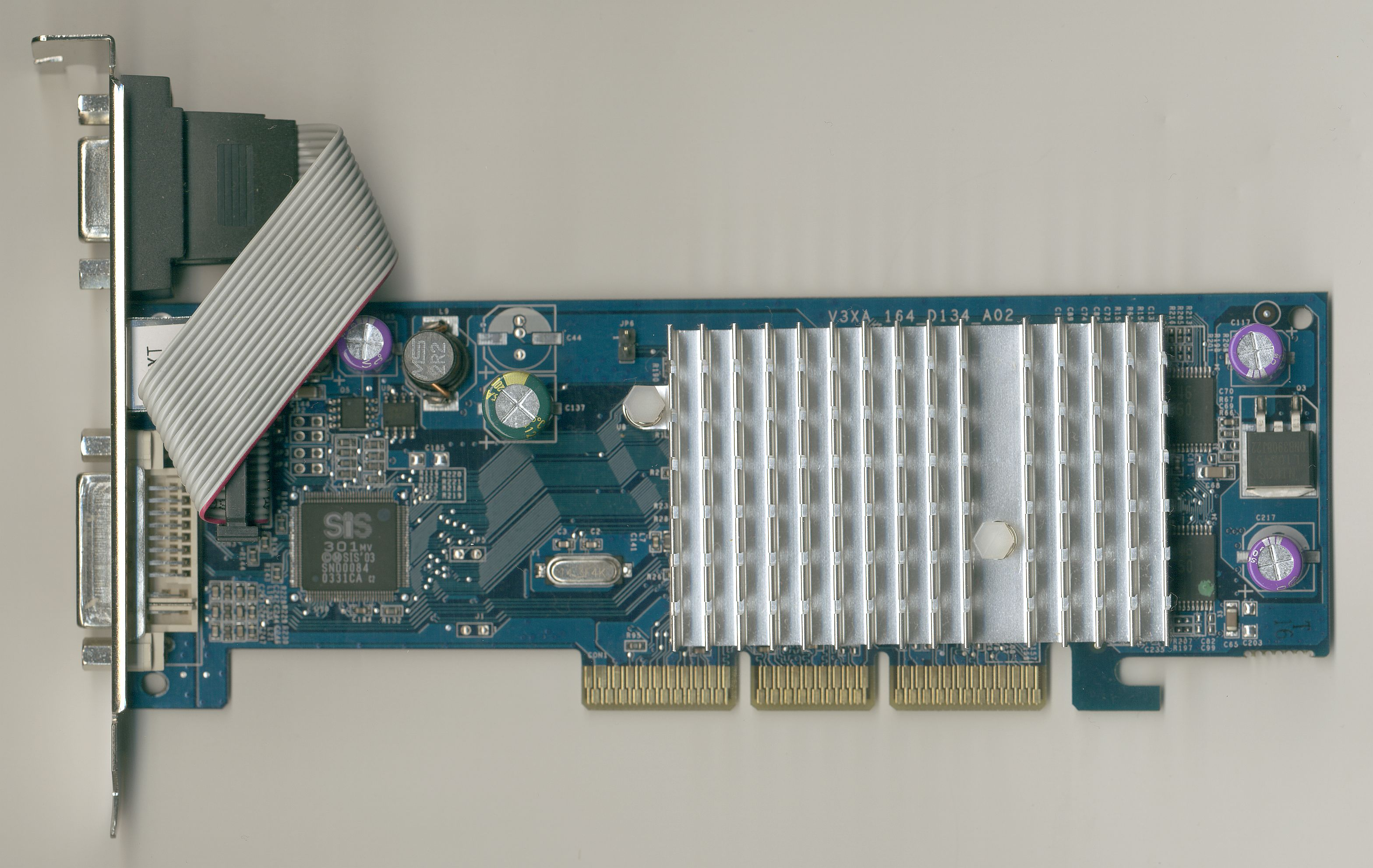
XGI Volari V3XT

== History ==
The V3 was introduced on September 15, 2003. It is a budget option, available with an 8x Accelerated Graphics Port interface from Walton Chaintech Corporation. It is similar in performance to the ATI Radeon 9200 SE, but is generally lower-priced.
