= Brilliance V5 =

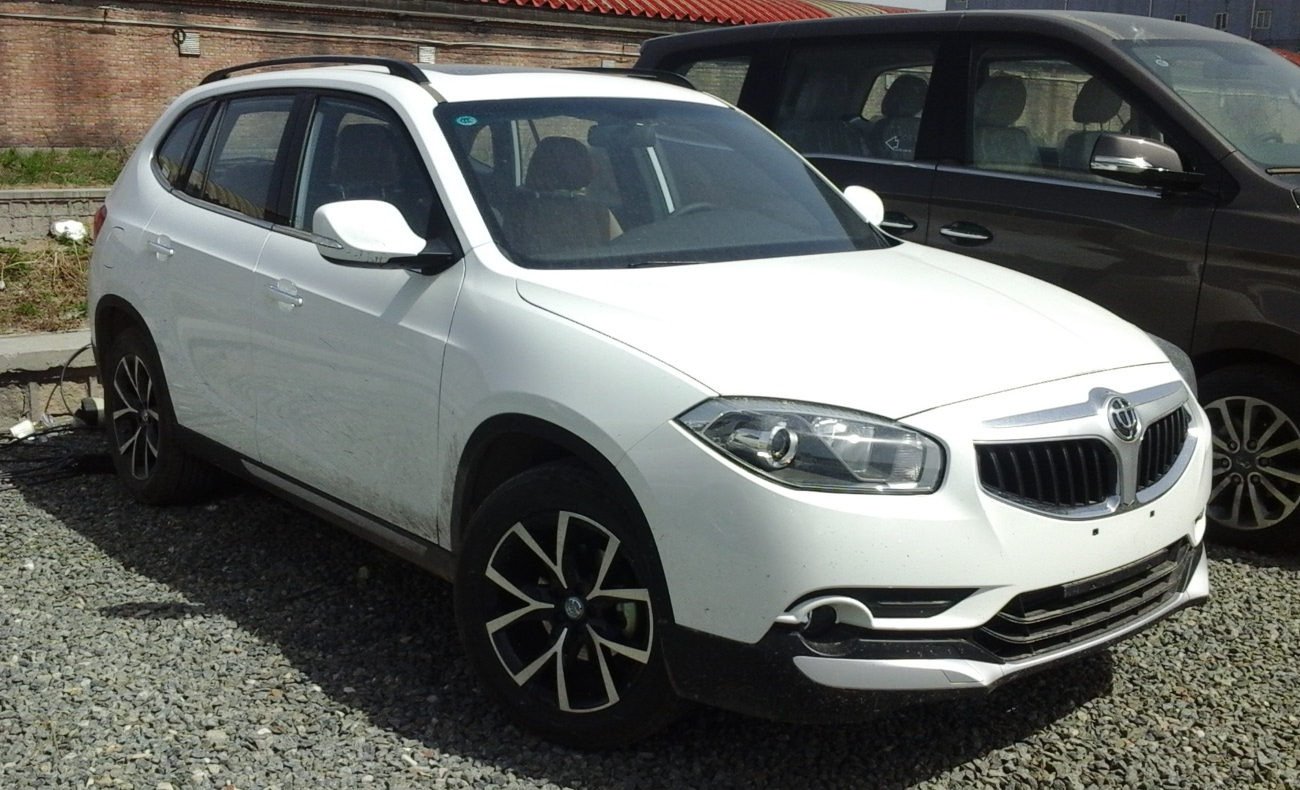

Overview
- Manufacturer: Brilliance Auto
- Production: 2011–2020
- Model years: 2012–2020

Body and chassis
- Class: Compact CUV (C)
- Body style: 5-door crossover
- Layout: Front-engine, front-wheel-drive
- Related: Brilliance H530 sedan

Powertrain
- Engine: 4A92 1.6 L I4 (2011-2020); 4A91 1.5 L turbo I4 (2017-2020)
- Transmission: 5-speed manual; 6-speed automatic

Dimensions
- Wheelbase: 2,725 mm (107.3 in)
- Length: 4,620 mm (181.9 in)
- Width: 1,922 mm (75.7 in)
- Height: 1,727–1,734 mm (68.0–68.3 in)
- Curb weight: 1,480–1,600 kg (3,263–3,527 lb)

The Brilliance V5 is a compact CUV produced by Brilliance Auto under the Zhonghua brand. The Brilliance V5 was unveiled on the 2011 Guangzhou Auto Show in China with prices ranging from 109,800 to 165,800 yuan.

The vehicle gained notoriety in Western car enthusiast circles for its decidedly Shanzhai exterior design, which is heavily, if not directly, copied off BMW X1 (E84), despite Brilliance also produced genuine X1 E84 (from 2016, F49) for Chinese markets through BMW Brilliance joint venture.

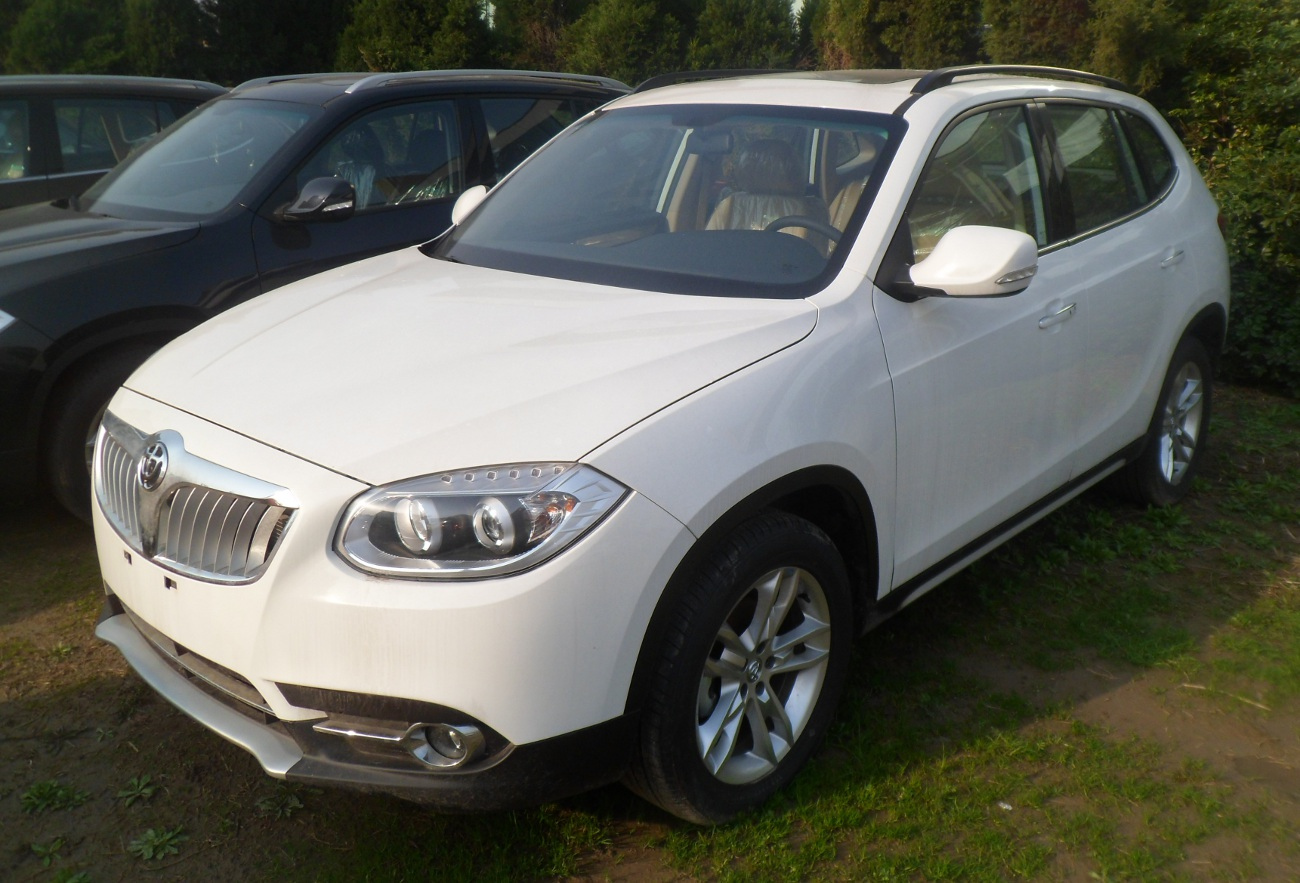
Brilliance V5 China

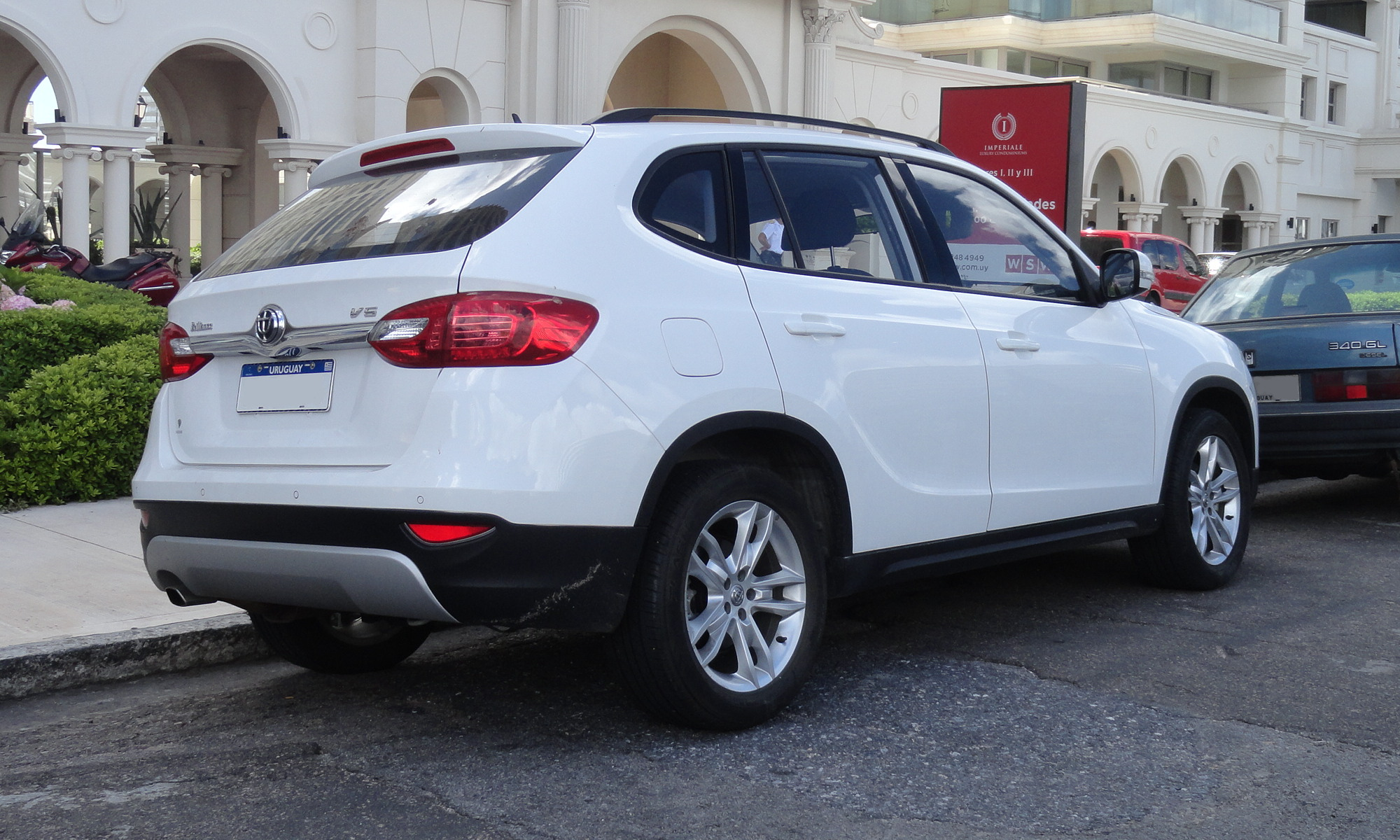
Brilliance V5

== 2014 facelift ==
A facelift for the Brilliance V5 CUV happened in 2014, and it debuted on the April 2014 Beijing Auto Show. The facelift includes a new grille, new headlights, new taillights, and new front and rear bumpers.

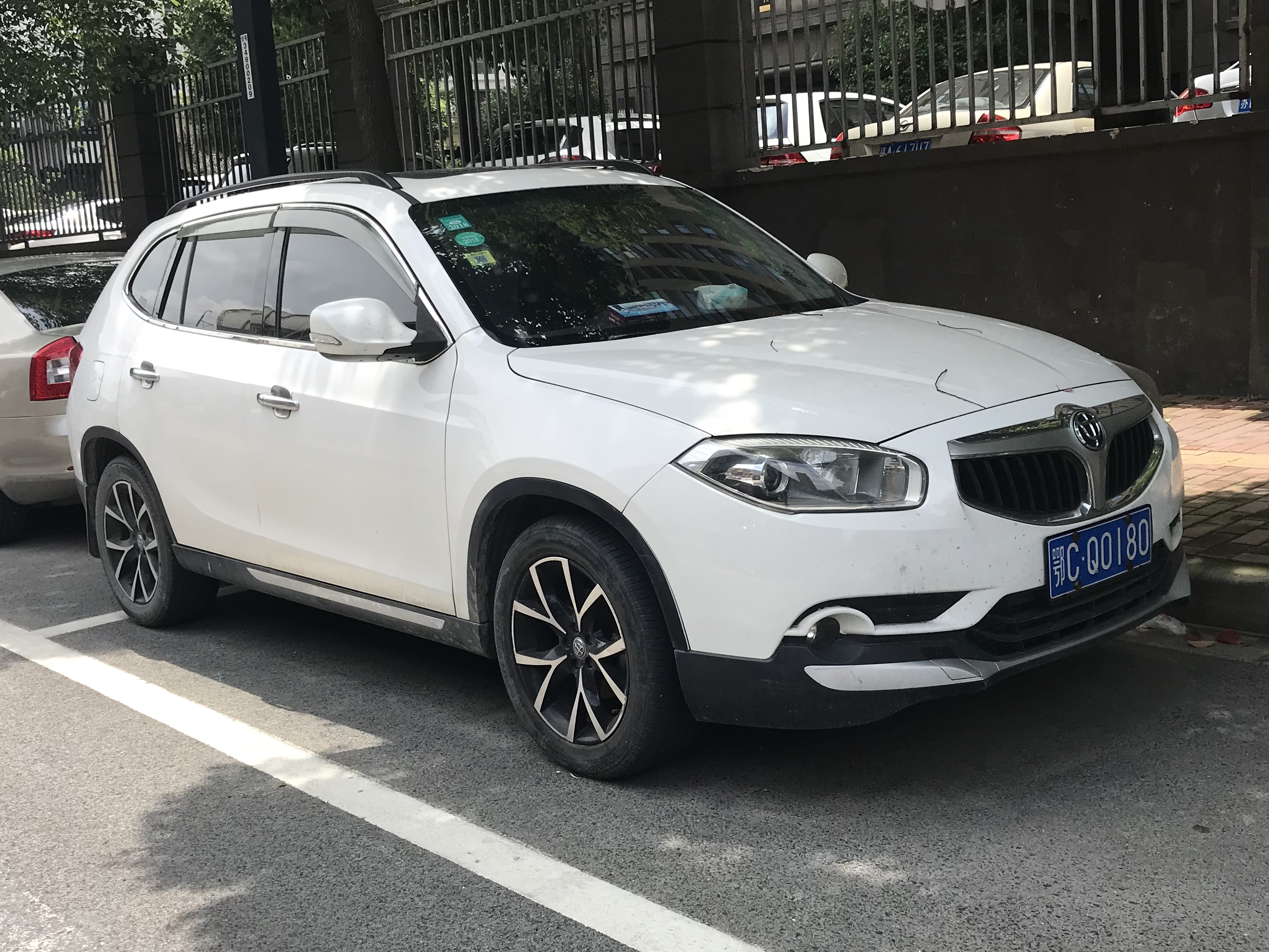
Brilliance V5 facelift front

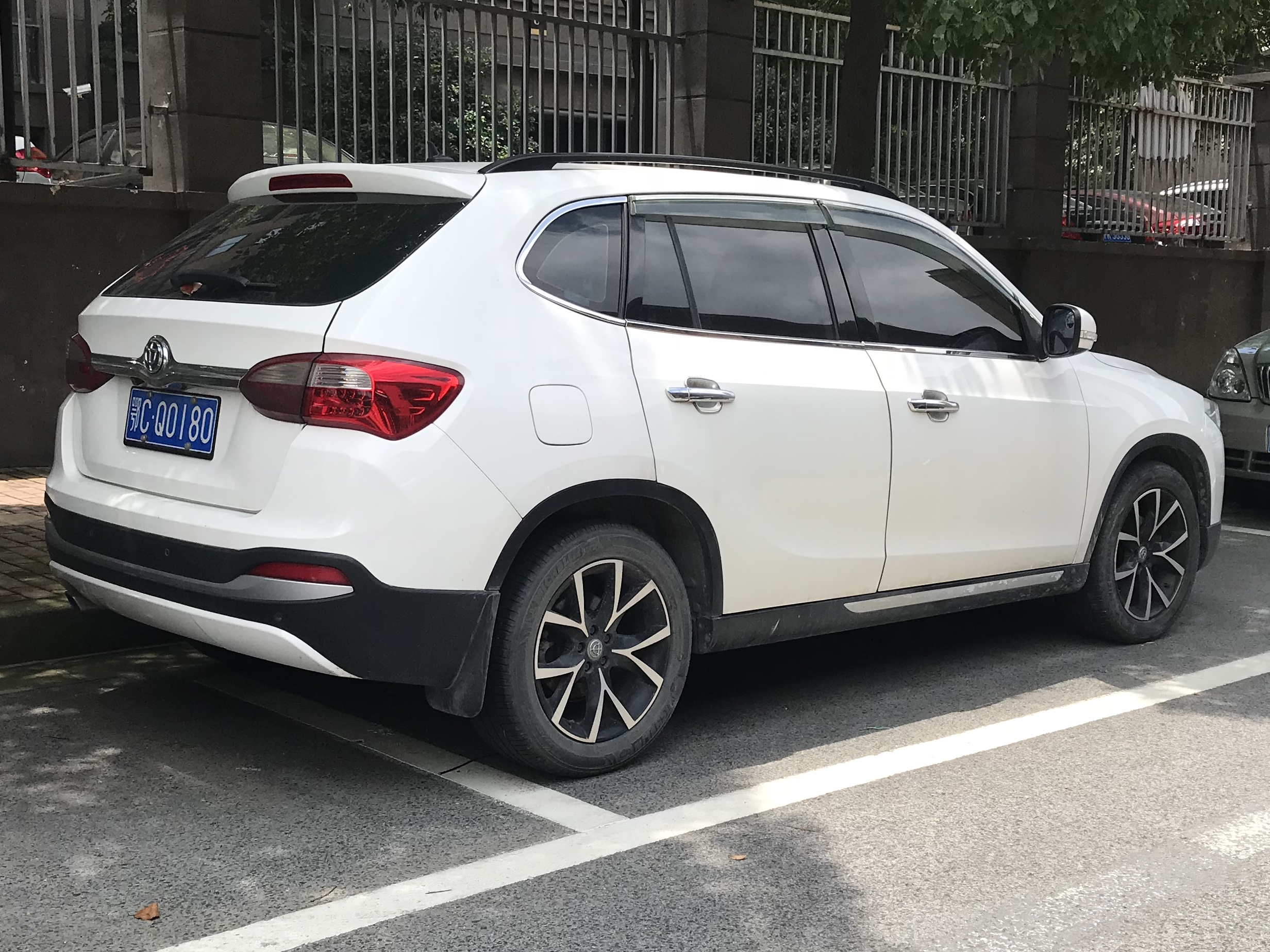
Brilliance V5 facelift rear
