= XGI Technology =

XGI Technology 圖誠科技
- Founded: June 2003; 23 years ago
- Headquarters: Taipei, Taiwan
- Products: Graphics cards

XGI Technology Inc. (Chinese: 圖誠科技; pinyin: Tú Chéng Kējì) was a Taiwanese hardware company. It was based upon the old graphics division of Silicon Integrated Systems (SiS) spun off as a separate company, and the graphics assets of Trident Microsystems. It existed from 2003 to 2010.

== History ==
Founded in June 2003 and headquartered in Taipei, Taiwan, it was sometimes called eXtreme Graphics Innovation and headed by Chris Lin. In December 2003, XGI announced the Volari Duo, a graphics card with two GPUs. This was seen as part of a potentially successful attempt to become competitive with ATI Technologies and Nvidia Corporation, which were the two largest GPU manufacturers in the world at the time.

A few months after the announced release, XGI graphics cards were found by enthusiasts and hardware reviewers to be less than competitive with ATi and Nvidia cards. Some of the many performance and visualization problems were blamed on underdeveloped drivers. Even so, XGI cards received good reviews in the low price/low performance video card market: XGI Volari V3 cards were judged by some reviewers to be competitive and even superior to equally priced video cards that were on the market, such as a Nvidia GeForce MX 4000 card. Many reviewers though were pessimistic of the possibility that XGI would be competitive in the 3D graphics card market.

On 6 March 2006, ATI Technologies announced the acquisition of Shanghai-based MacroSynergy, a fabless chip designer and XGI Technology alliance company, as well as related personnel working out of XGI Technology's Santa Clara, California location.

On 2006-10-17, RealVision Inc. announced forming technology alliance with XGI Technology Inc. On 2006-10-23, RealVision Inc. announced VREngine/XMD-Advanced series video cards, which used the previously canceled Volari 8300 (named Volari XG47), for use in medical imaging. Mass production was set to begin on 2007Q1.

On 27 May 2010, Silicon Integrated Systems (SIS) took control of XGI Technology and its iTV technology with an unveiling soon after.

In October, 2010, it was reported that SiS acquired the rest of XGI's assets.

== Integrated circuits ==
	Volari; 8300	Volari Duo; V8 Ultra	Volari; V8 Ultra	Volari; V5 Ultra
Chipset	XG47	XG40	XG40	XG41
Process (nm)	130	130	130	130
Transistors (millions)	90?	2(90)	90	90?
Interface	PCIe	AGP	AGP	AGP
Vertex Pipelines	2	2 × 2	2	2
Vertex Shader Version	2.0	2.0	2.0	2.0
Fragment Pipelines / TMU per Pipeline	2 × 2	2(8 × 1)	8 × 1	4 × 1
Pixel Shader Units	4	2(4)	4	2
Core Speed (MHz)	300	350	350	350
Fill Rate (MTexels/s)	4800	11200	5600	2800
Memory Bus Width (bits)	64	256	128	128

== Cards ==
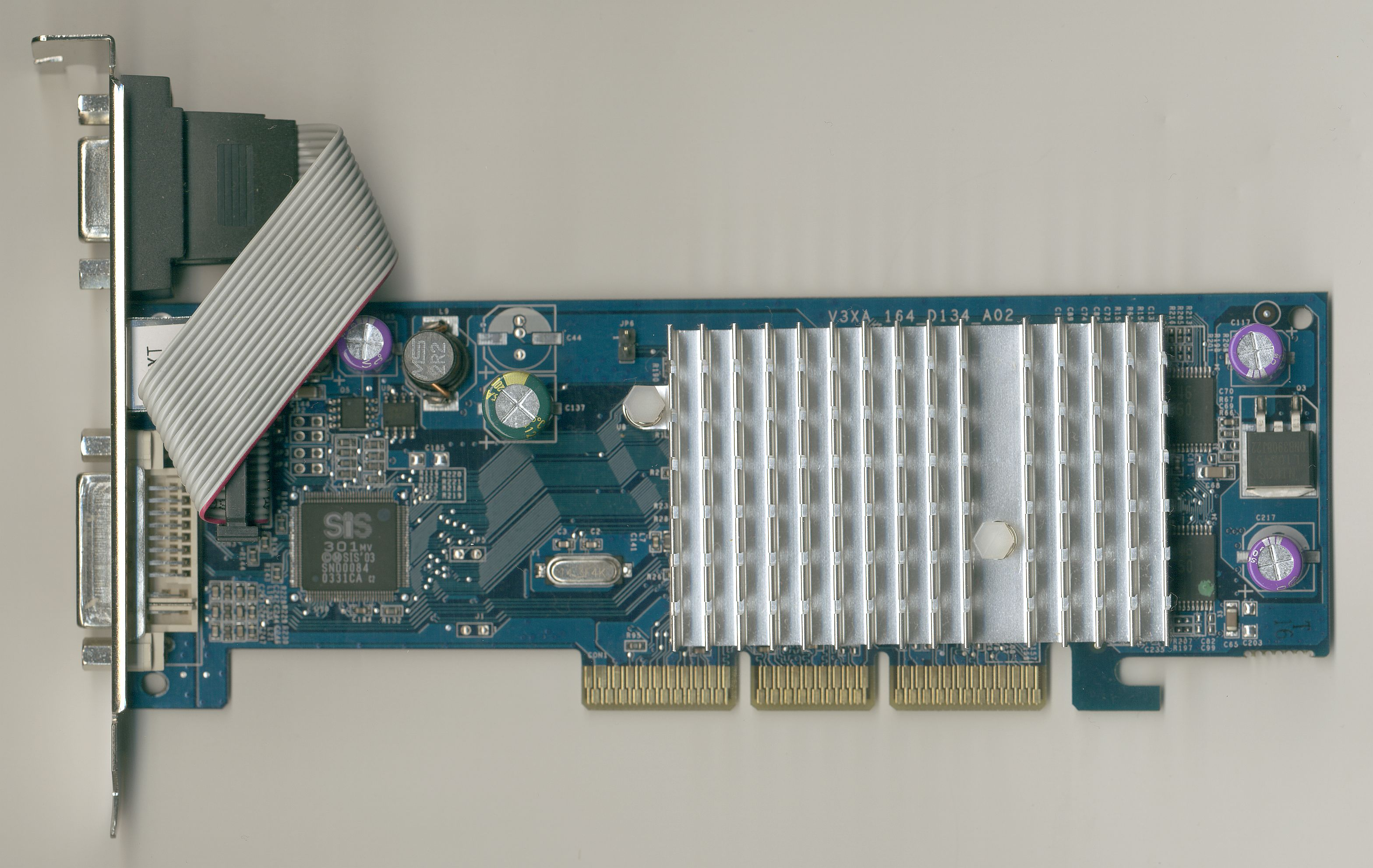
XGI Volari V3XT

Its line of graphics cards included:

=== Developed by SiS team ===
- Volari Duo
- Volari V8, V8 Ultra
- Volari V5, V5 Ultra
- Volari V3 XT
- Volari V3 XE, V5 XE
- Volari Z7
- Volari Z9, Z9s — used by some server-class motherboards (ex. Supermicro X7SBA, X7SBT, and X7SBL series)
- Volari Z11

Cancelled products

- Volari V5 XT
- Volari 8600, 8600 Mobile, 8600XT

=== Developed by Trident team ===
- Volari V3
- Volari XP5, XP5m32, XP5m64
- Volari 8300 - Although product page is no longer available, and production of video cards using it are cancelled, the chips were made into production models of RealVision XMD Advanced series video cards.
- Volari 8300 Mobile/Volari XP10 - Originally titled Volari 8300 Mobile, it was renamed to Volari XP10 when it was finally available. XP10 added LVDS transmitter.

== See also ==
- List of companies of Taiwan
