= 5V =

5V or 5-V may refer to:

- 5V, IATA code for Everts Air
  - 5V, former IATA code for Lviv Airlines
- 5V, abbreviation for 5 volts, sometimes incorrectly written as 5v
- 5V, abbreviation for 5-valve engine
- ZIS-5V, a model of ZIS-5 (truck)
- 5V, a model of Toyota V engine
- 5V, a model series for Intel 80386
- 5V chess; see Minishogi
- 5V, the production code for the 1981 Doctor Who serial Logopolis

== See also ==
- V5 (disambiguation)
