= Volari Duo =

On September 15, 2003 XGI Technology Inc introduced the Volari Duo V8 Ultra and the Volari Duo V5 Ultra. These dual GPU graphics cards while impressive looking failed to compete with the single core GPU cards put out by NVIDIA and ATI and disappeared from the market.
