= Brilliance H530 =

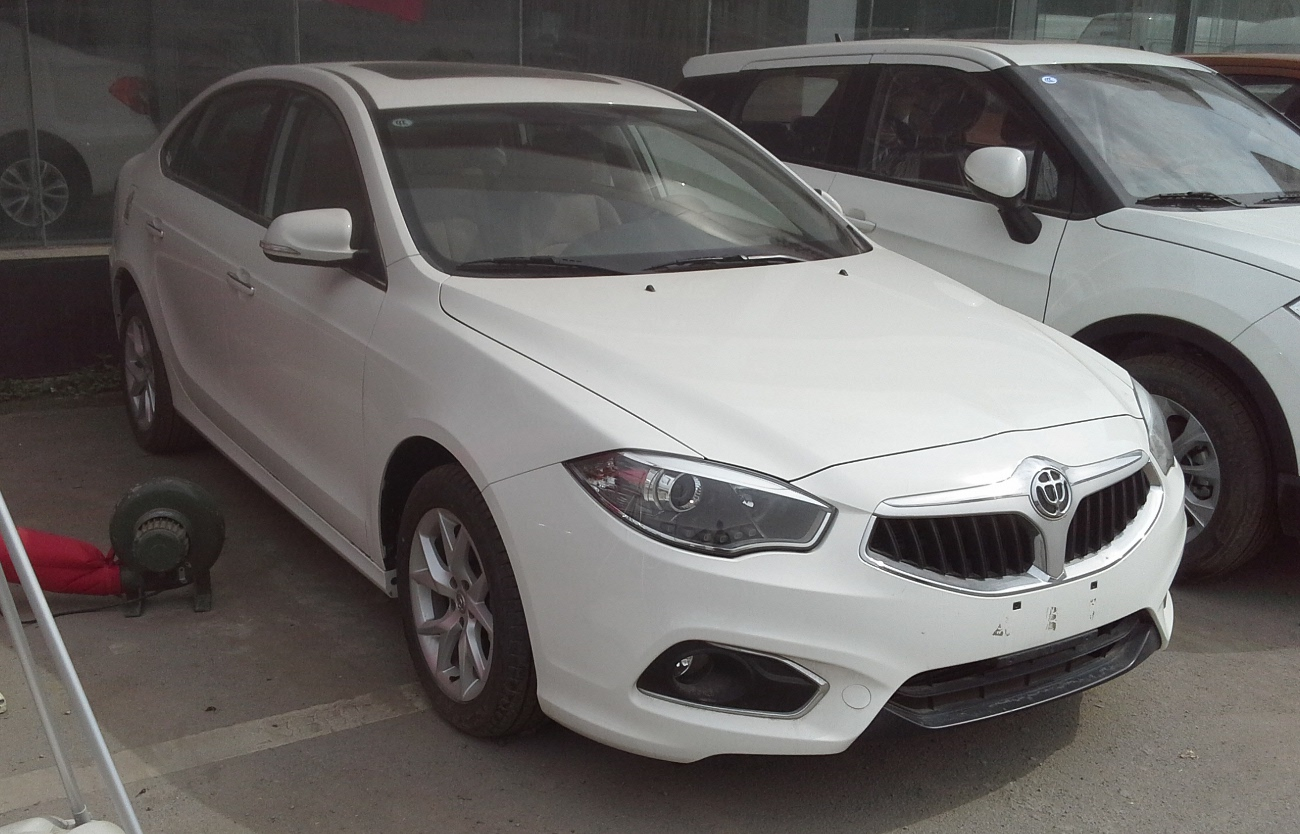

Overview
- Manufacturer: Brilliance Auto
- Also called: Brilliance 530
- Production: 2011-2020
- Assembly: Shenyang, Liaoning, China; 6th of October City, Egypt (BAG)

Body and chassis
- Class: Mid-size car (D)
- Body style: 4 door sedan
- Layout: Front-engine, front-wheel-drive

Powertrain
- Engine: 1.5 L BM15TB I4 (turbo petrol); 1.6 L 4A92 I4 (petrol)
- Transmission: 5-speed manual 5 speed automatic

Dimensions
- Wheelbase: 2,700 mm (106.3 in)
- Length: 4,740 mm (186.6 in)
- Width: 1,788 mm (70.4 in)
- Height: 1,475 mm (58.1 in)

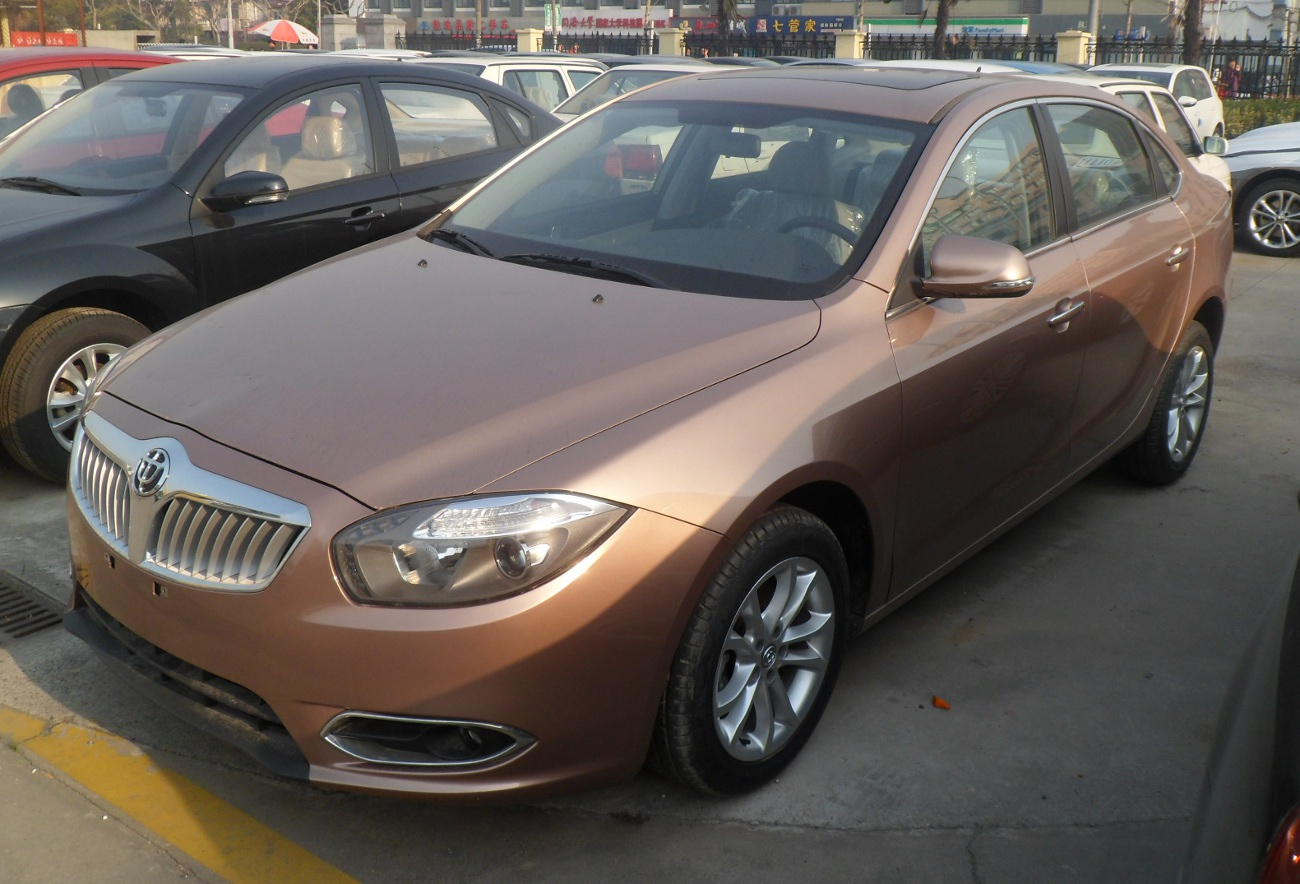
Brilliance H530 pre-facelift

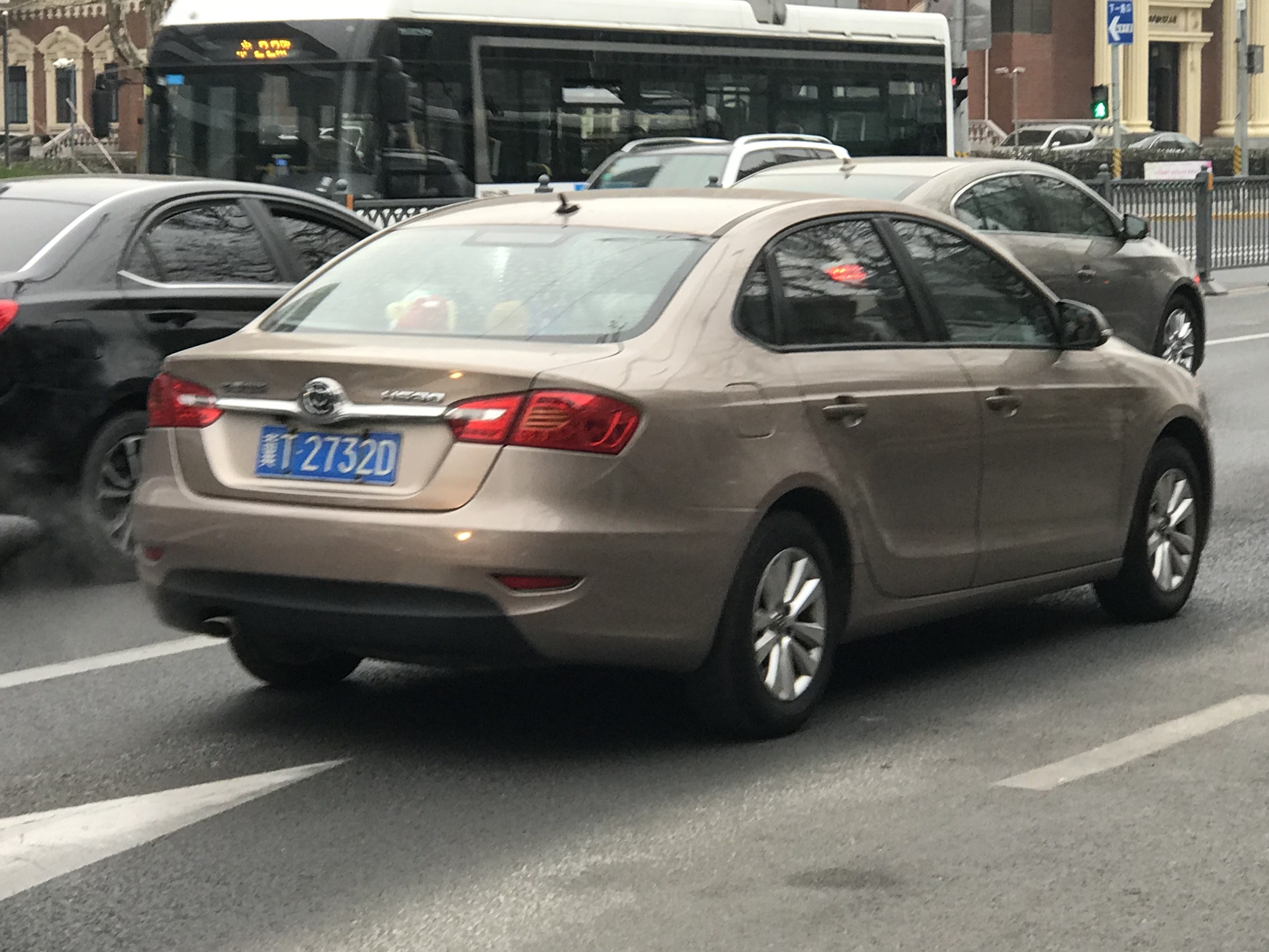
Brilliance H530 pre-facelift rear

The Brilliance H530 sedan is a mid-size sedan (D) produced by Brilliance Auto positioned above the Brilliance H330 compact sedan. The Brilliance 530 concept debuted at the 2011 Shanghai Auto Show in April 2011, while the production version, renamed to Brilliance H530 was officially listed on the Chinese market later on 29 August 2011. Pricing ranges from 79,800 yuan to 125,800 yuan.

== 2014 facelift ==
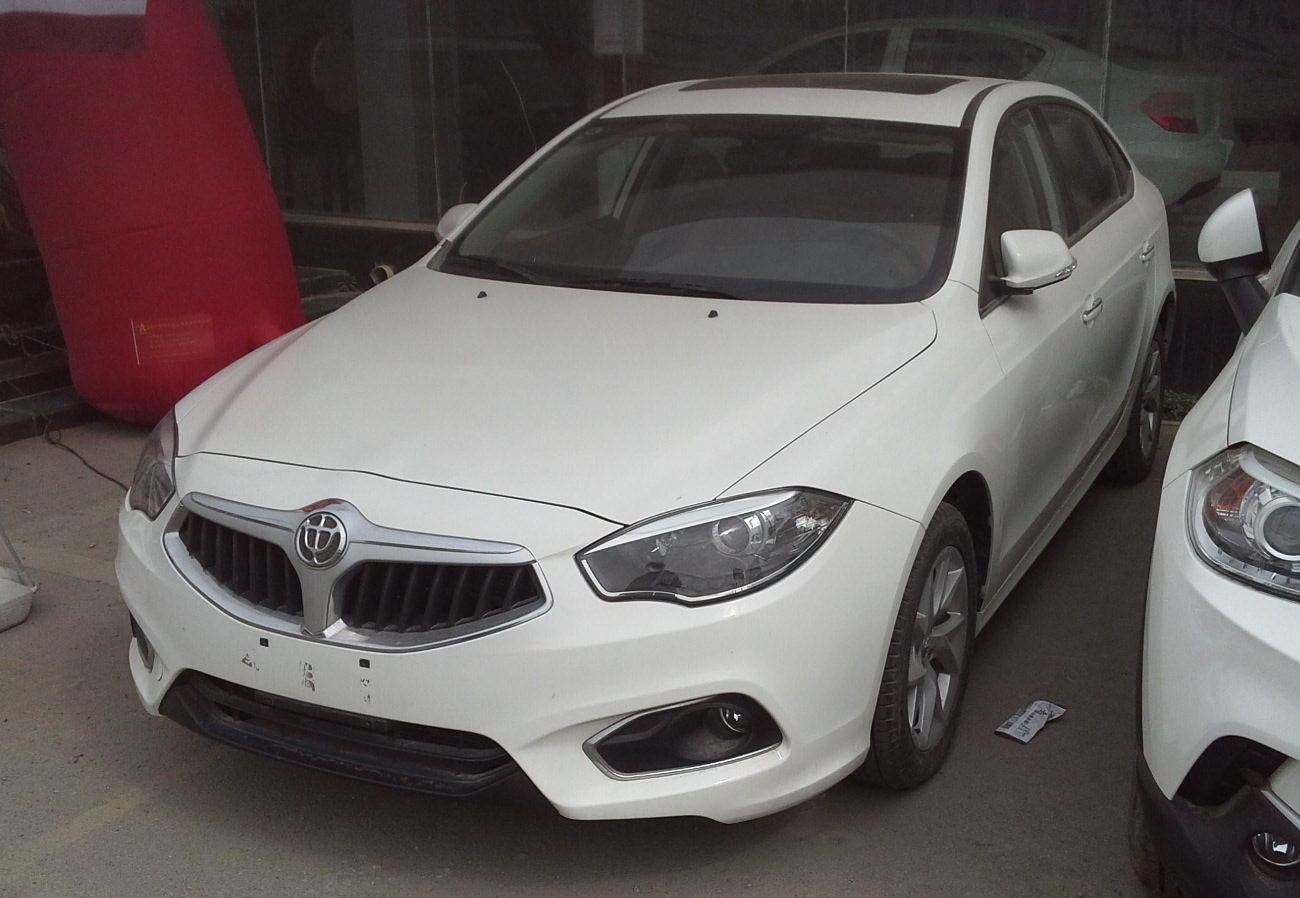
Brilliance H530 facelift

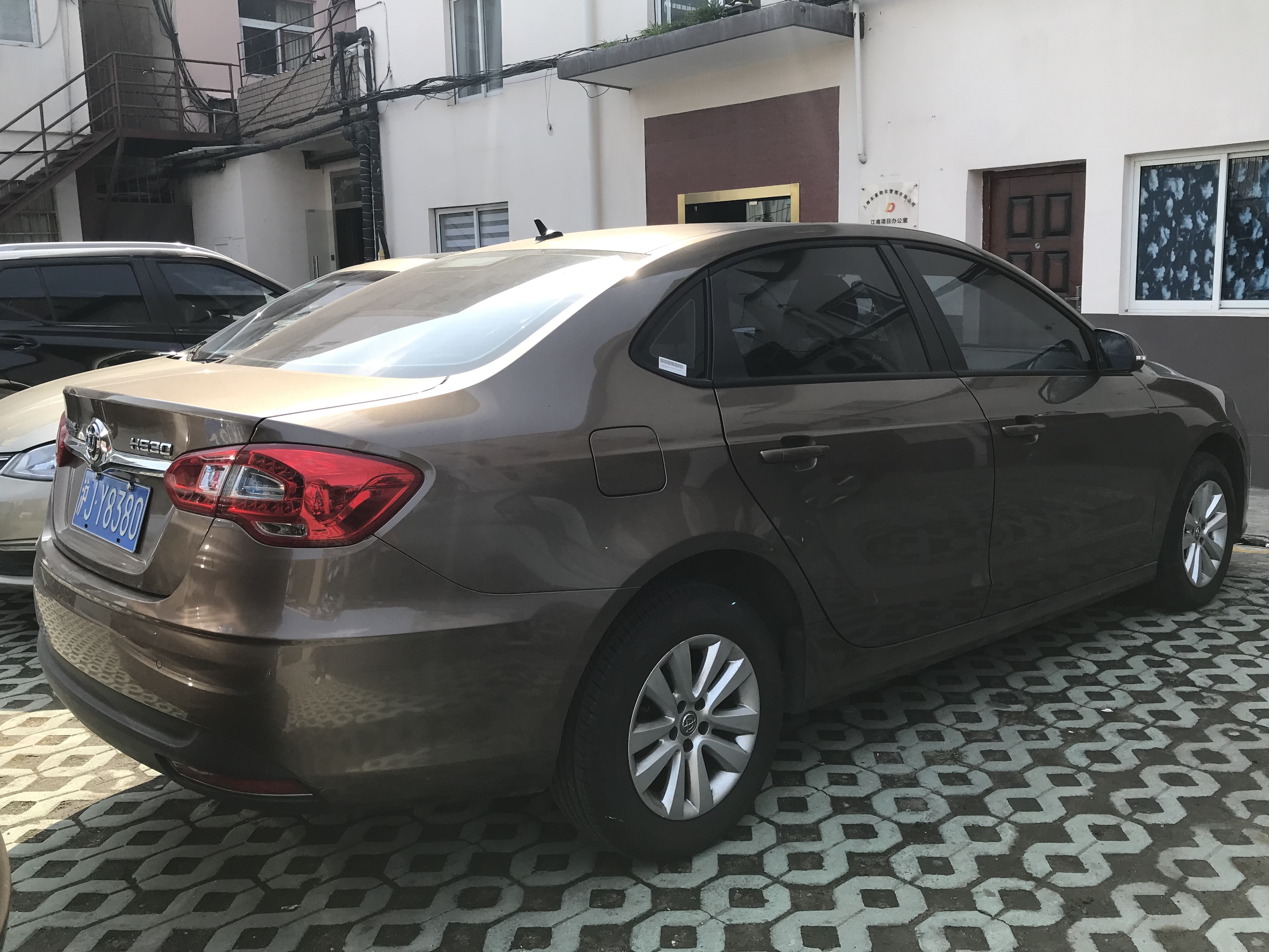
Brilliance H530 facelift rear view

Brilliance H530 sedan went through a facelift that debuted on the 2014 Beijing Auto Show. The facelift introduced a new grille, new headlights, and new front and rear bumpers. The facelifted Brilliance H530 was launched on the China car market before the end of April 2014 with prices ranging from 65,000 to 95,000 yuan. However, the new design language of Brilliance H530, which represents the letter 'zhong' in Chinese, can be easily mistaken with a BMW 3 Series.
