= Volari V5 =

2003 graphics card by XGI Technology Inc

On September 15, 2003, XGI Technology Inc introduced the Volari V5. The V5 is a video card and was available with an Accelerated Graphics Port (AGP) 8x interface in Taiwan. It is similar in terms of clock speed to the Radeon 9600 Pro and the GeForce FX 5600.
