= Kuayue Chana V5 =

Chinese automobile

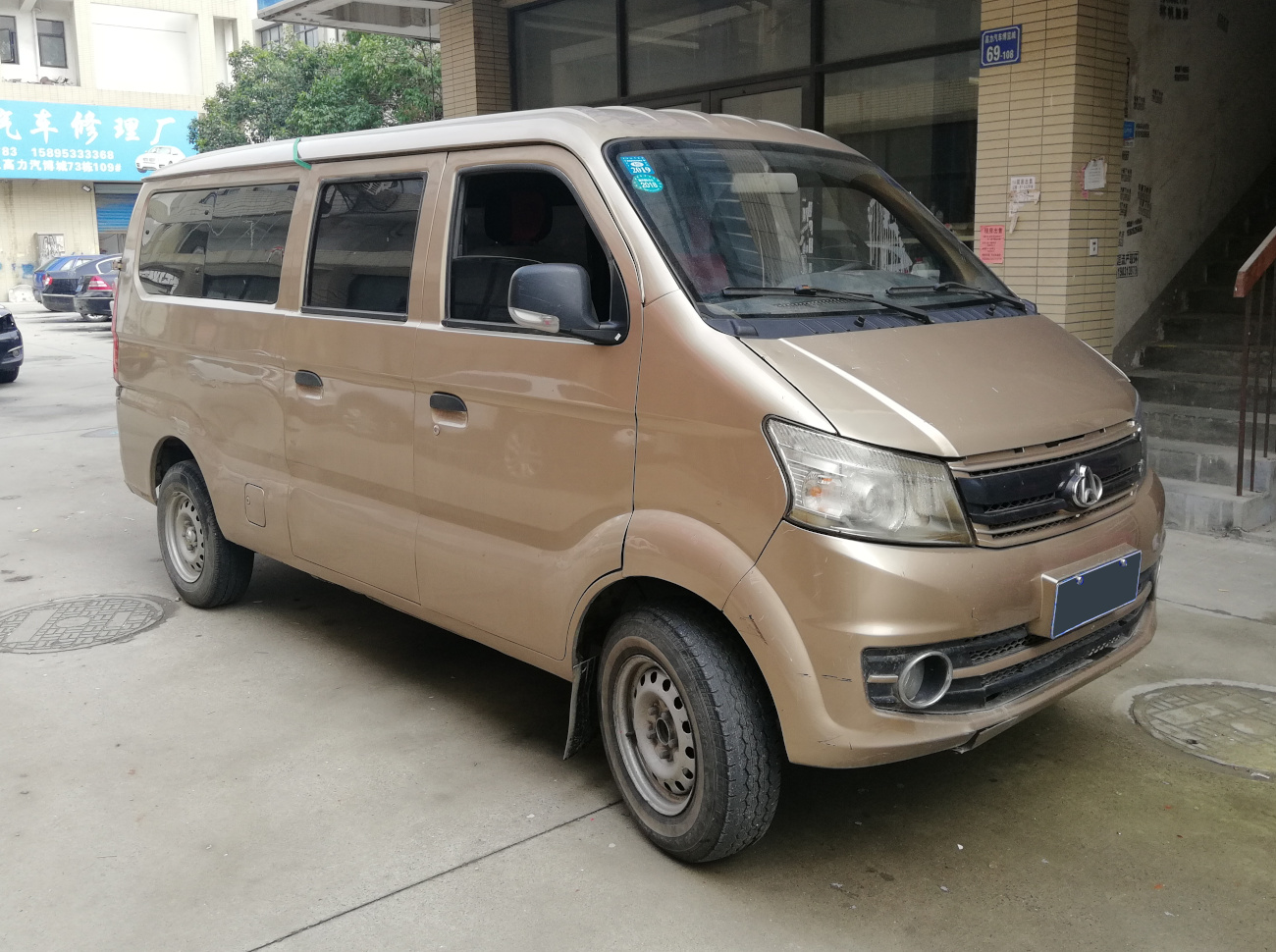
- Kuayue V5 van

Overview
- Manufacturer: Changan Automobile
- Also called: Chang'an-Kuayue (Chana) V5; Kuayuewang X5 (truck variant); Kuayuewang X7 (truck variant); KYC V5
- Production: 2013–present
- Model years: 2013–present

Body and chassis
- Class: Microvan
- Body style: 6-door van 2-door pick up 4-door pick up
- Layout: Mid-engine, rear-wheel-drive

Powertrain
- Engine: 1.2 L I4 (petrol); 1.5 L I4 (petrol)
- Transmission: 5-speed manual

Dimensions
- Wheelbase: 2,900 mm (114.2 in)
- Length: 4,498 mm (177.1 in)
- Width: 1,735 mm (68.3 in)
- Height: 1,940 mm (76.4 in)
- Curb weight: 1330kg

The Kuayue Chana V5 (Chinese: 长安跨越 长安V5) is a microvan produced by Chongqing Kuayue Automobile Co., Ltd of Changan Automobile under the Kuayue sub-brand.

== Overview ==
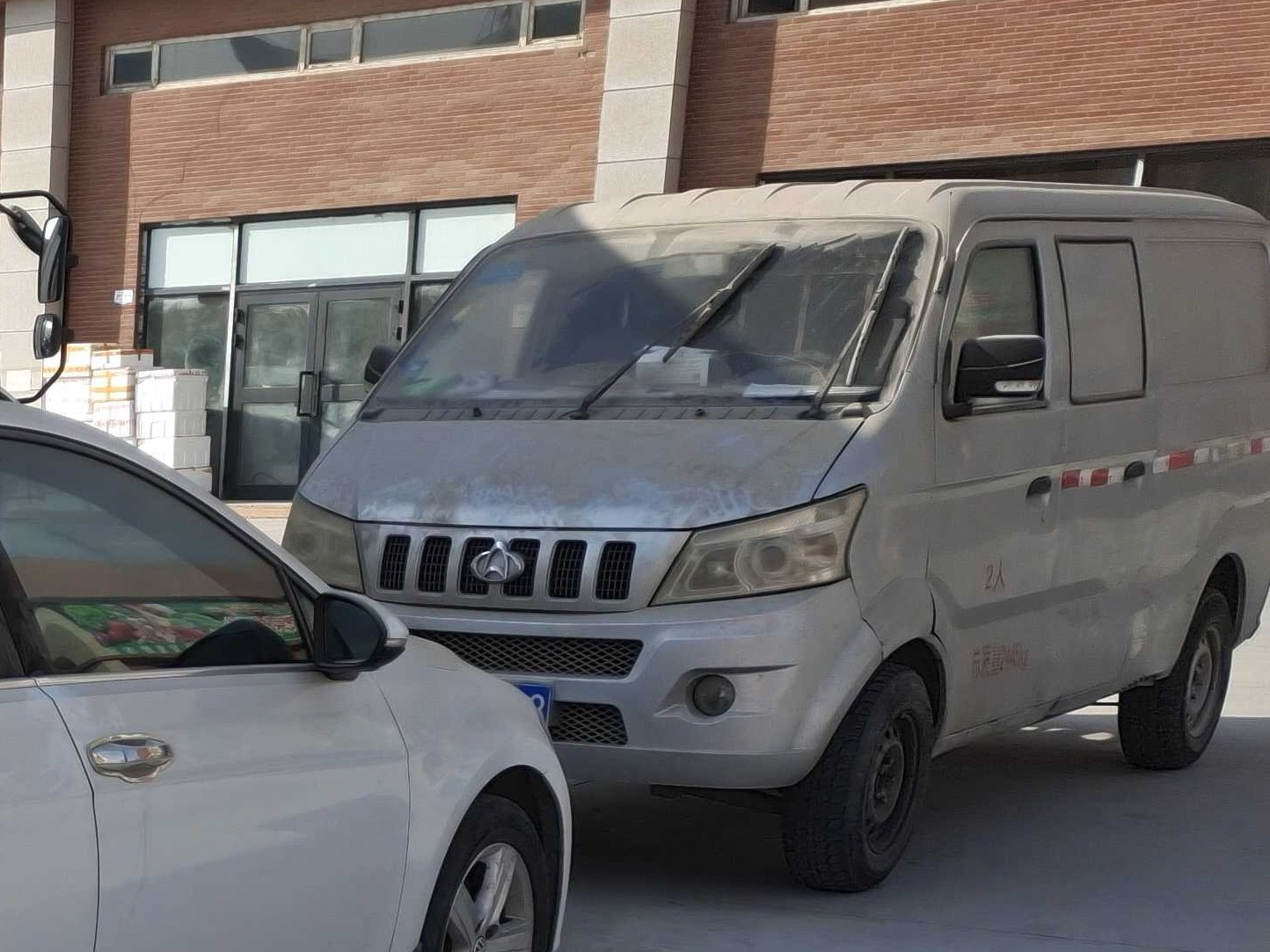
Original Chana Xinbao V5

The model was originally sold under the Xinbao series of Chana as the Xinbao V5 (长安新豹V5) as of 2015, and was later renamed to be sold under the Kuayue brand.

The Kuayue Chana V5 is a 6-door van featuring a 2-piece tail gate and 4 hinged doors on the side for occupants. The V5 is available as a passenger van or a panel van and can seat from 2 to 5 occupants.

The V5 is powered by an 64 kW (87 hp) 1.2 liter naturally aspirated engine with 109Nm of torque at 3200rpm mated to a 5-speed manual transmission. A top of the trim variant powered by a 82 kW (112 hp) 1.5 liter inline-4 engine with 142Nm of torque is also available. Prices for the V5 ranges from 42,800 yuan to 46,600 yuan as of 2014.

=== Electric variant ===
An electric panel van version is also available for the logistics industry in China. The electric variant is powered by a choice of two 60 kW and 380N·m electric motors and a 70 kW and 380N·m electric motor with a selection between a 48.5kWh battery or a 41.86kWh battery with a range of 280 km.

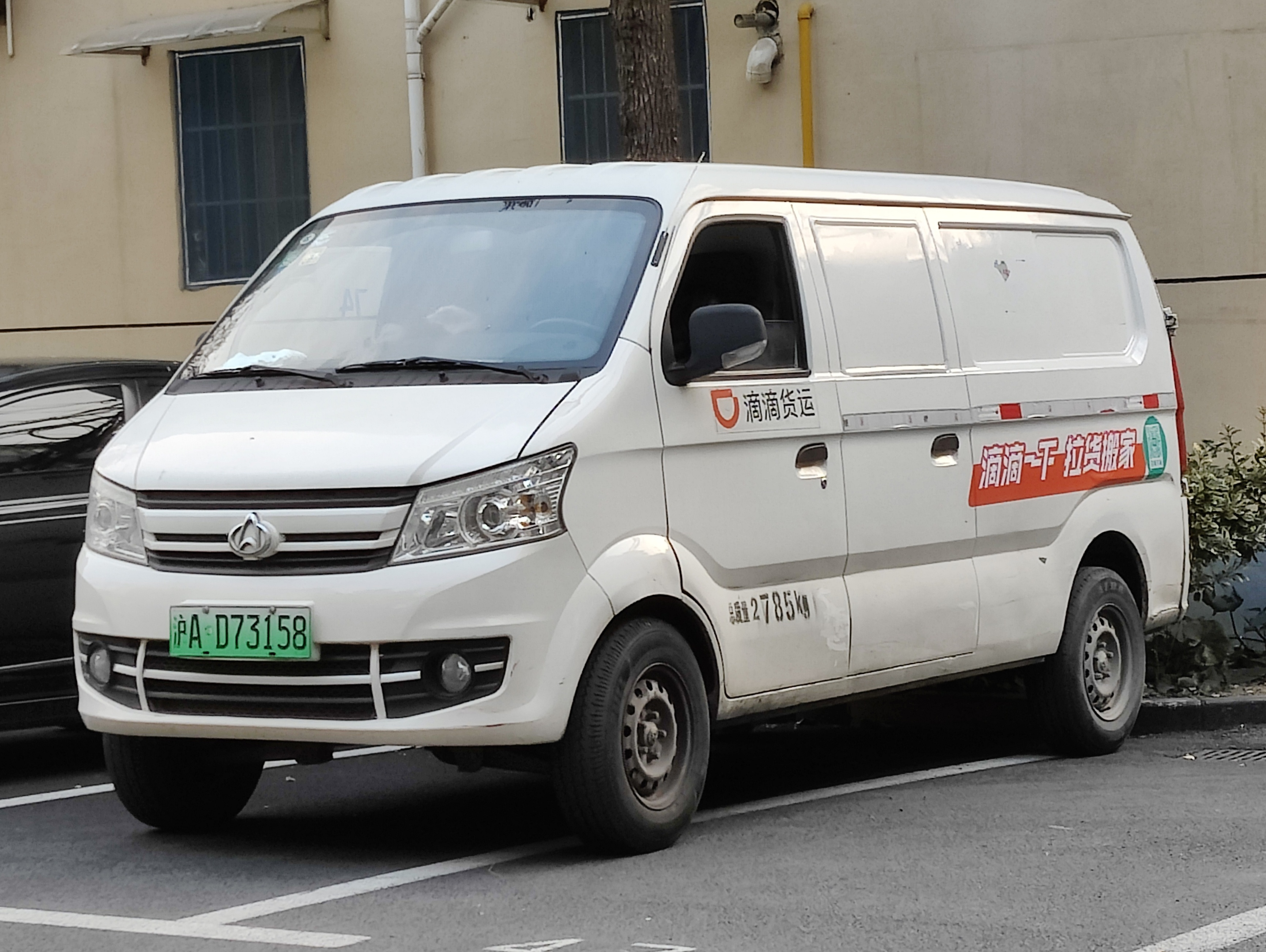
Kuayue Chana V5 electric van

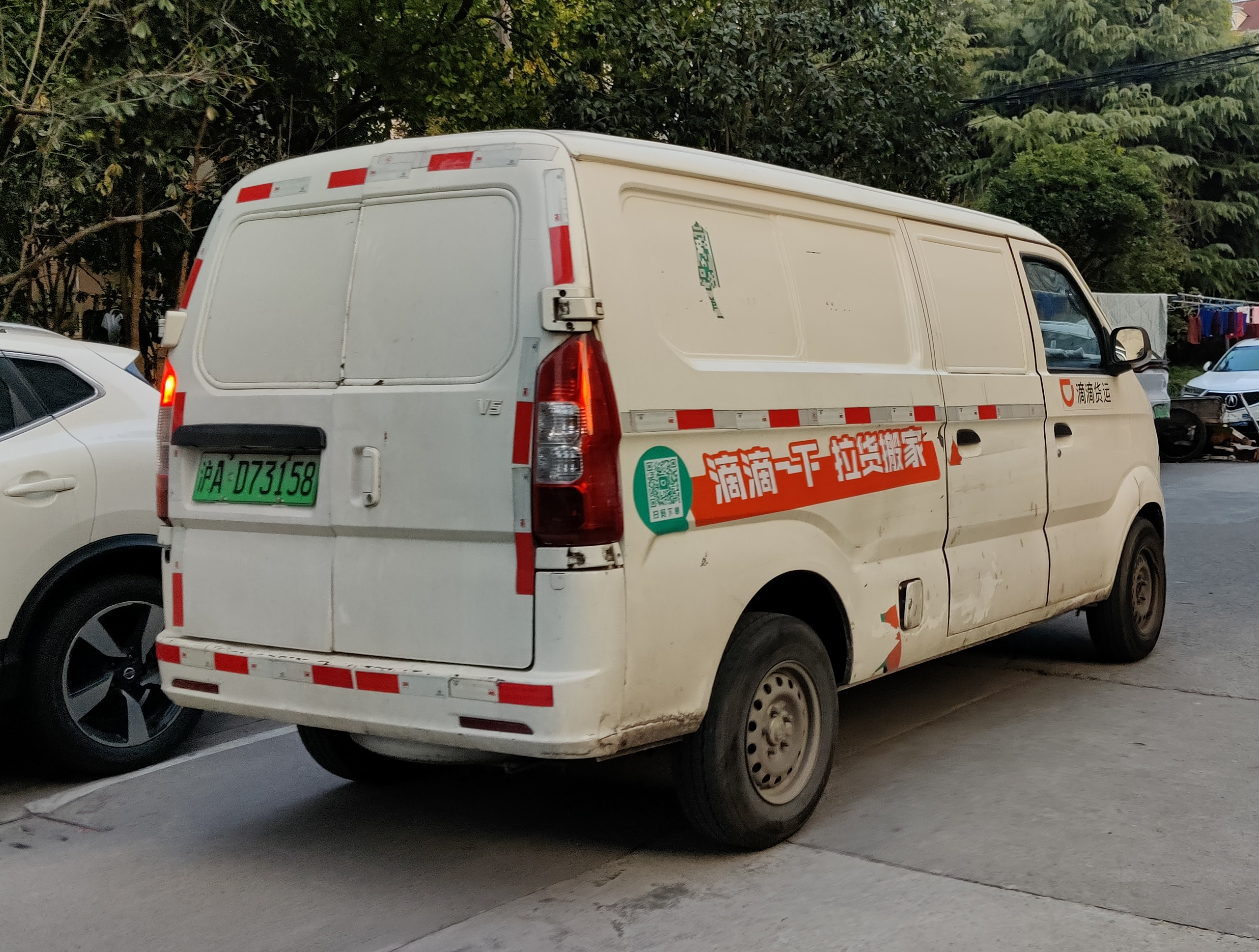
Kuayue Chana V5 (rear)

=== Kuayue Kuayuewang X5 ===
The Kuayue Kuayuewang X5 is the truck variant produced by Chongqing Kuayue Automobile Co., Ltd and sold under the Changan Kuayue sub-brand. The Kuayuewang X5 shares the same front end design as the V5 and is available as single cab and double cab variants with the cargo area available as a sealed box, a standard drop side bed and a heavy duty long wheelbase model.

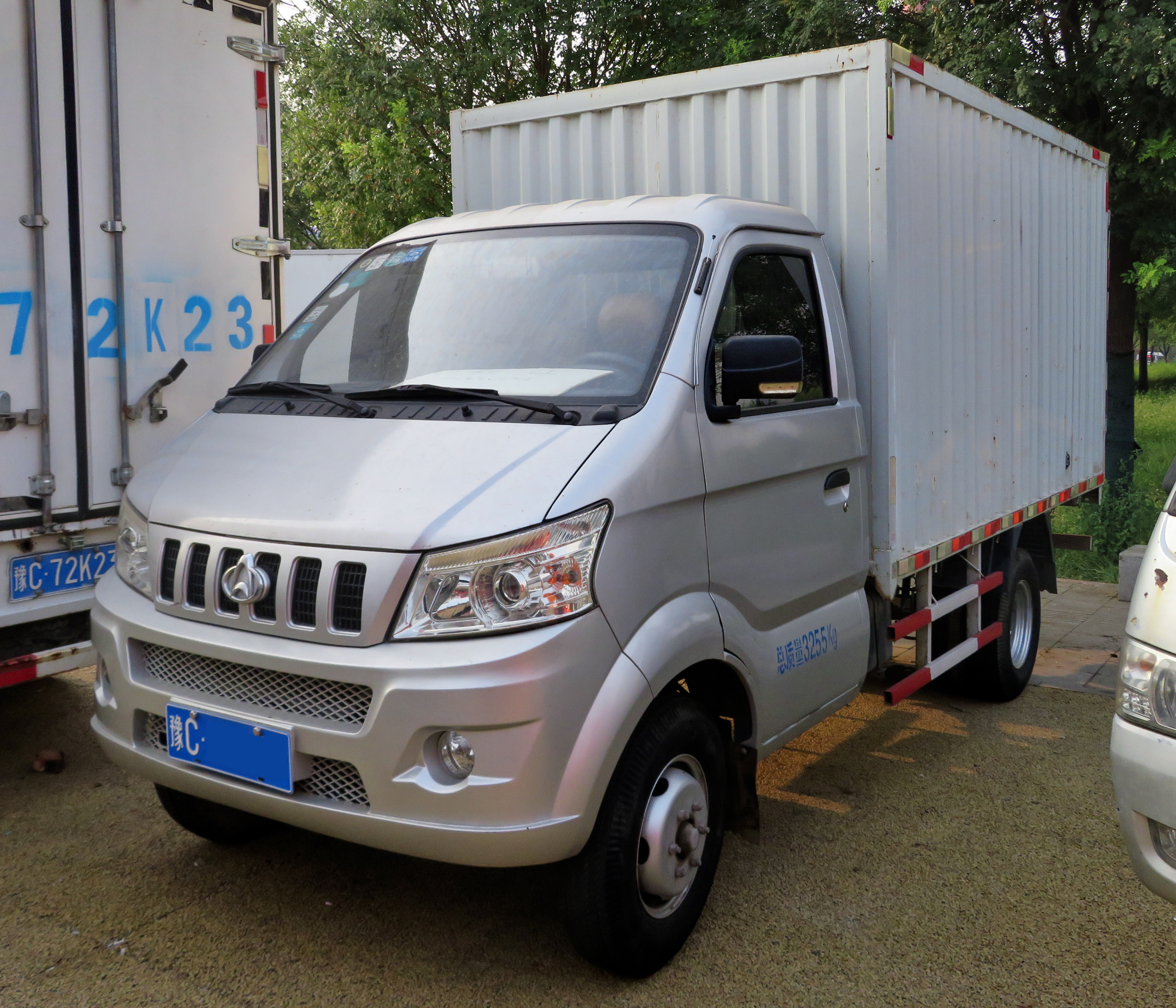
Kuayue Kuayuewang X5 single cab sealed box

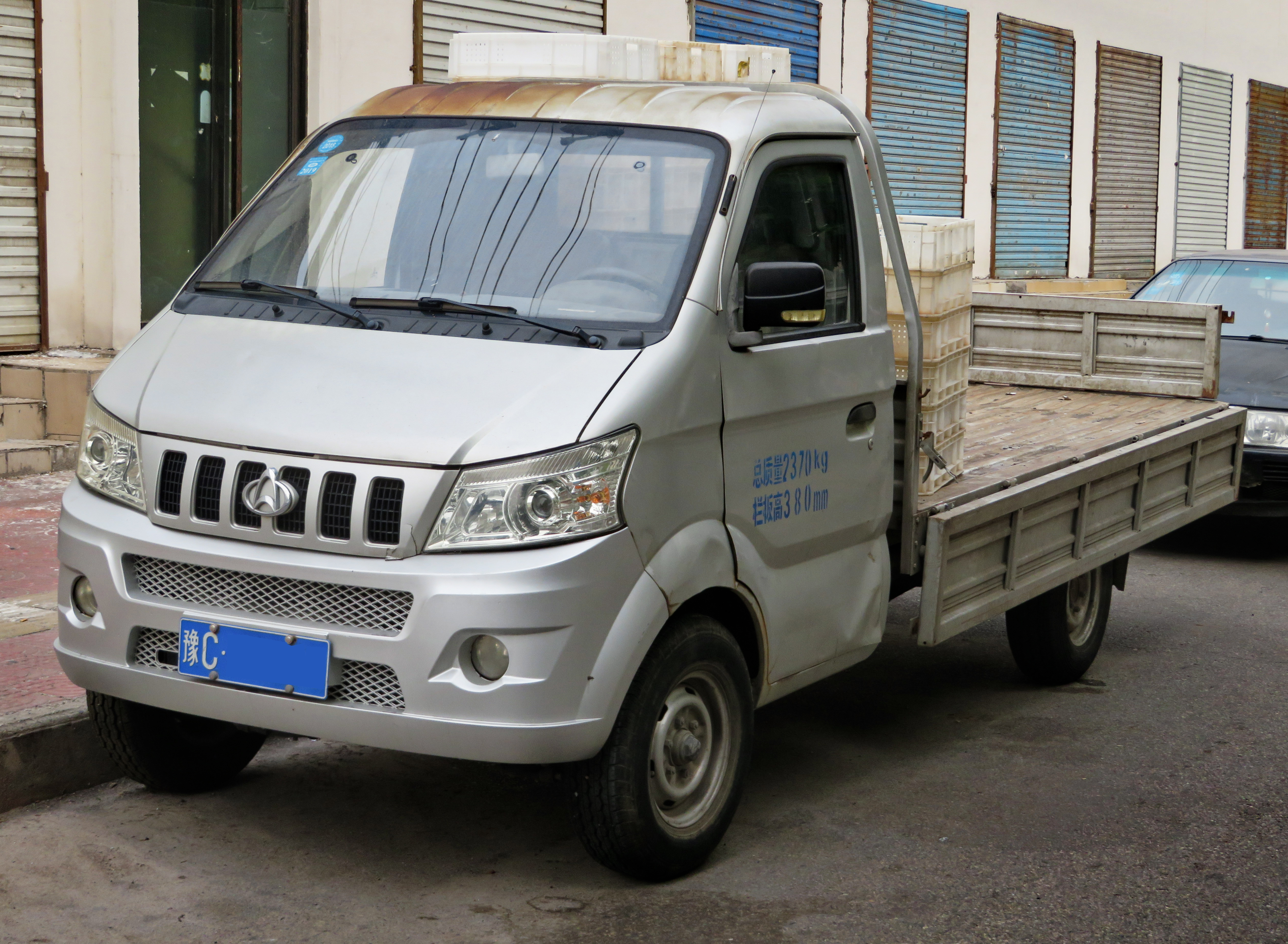
Kuayue Kuayuewang X5 single cab drop side bed

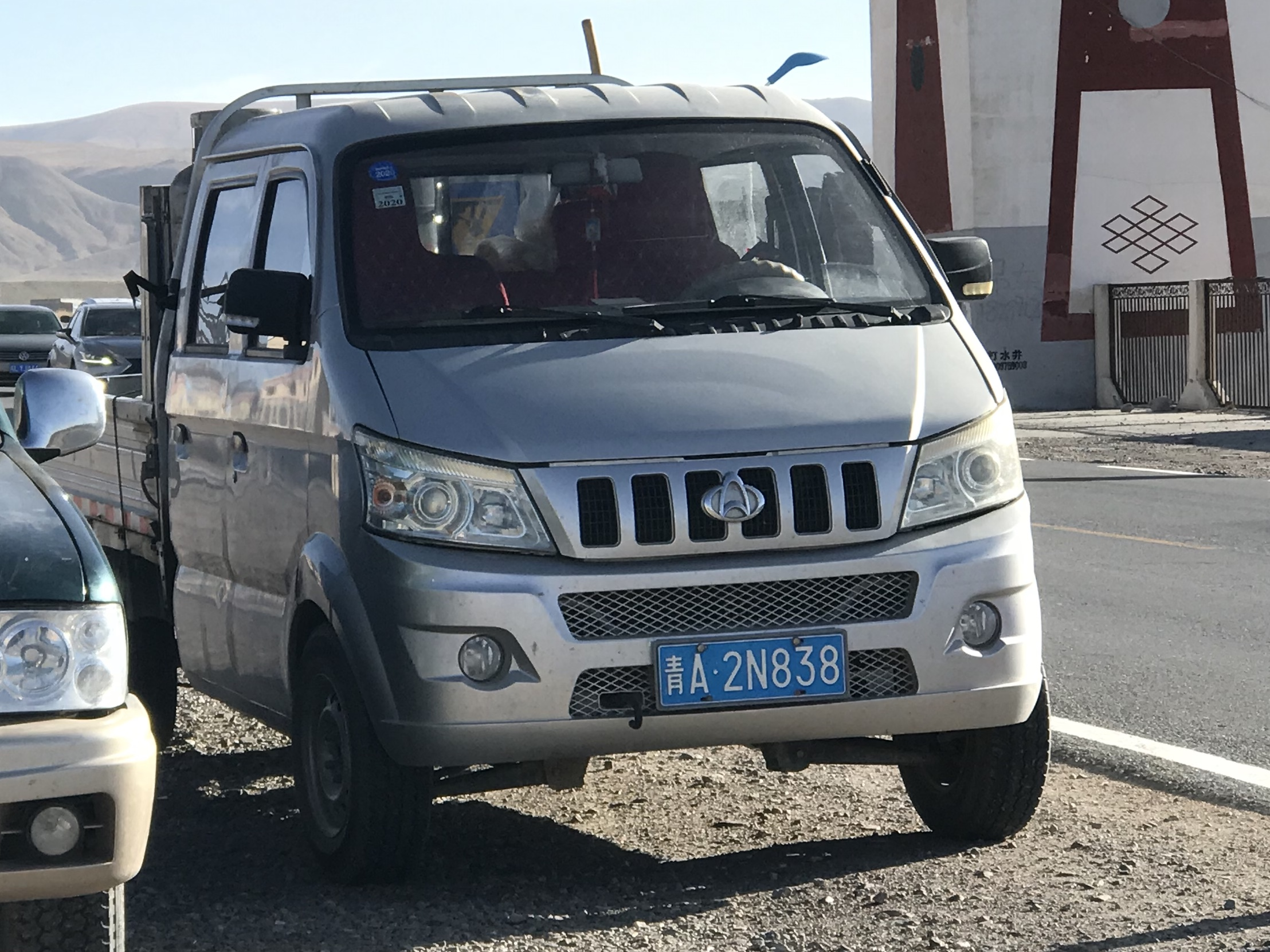
Kuayue Kuayuewang X5 double cab

=== Kuayue Kuayuewang X7 (2023) ===
Launched for the 2023 model year, the Kuayue Kuayuewang X7 is an updated truck variant produced by Chongqing Kuayue Automobile Co., Ltd and sold under the Changan Kuayue sub-brand. Essentially being a facelift of the Kuayuewang X5, it was aimed to replace the Kuayue Kuayuewang X5 line that ended production on the same year.

Kuayue Kuayuewang X7 crew cab

=== 2017 facelift ===
The Chana V5 and Kuayuewang X5 received a facelift in 2017 updating the front grilles and bumper to a cleaner design.

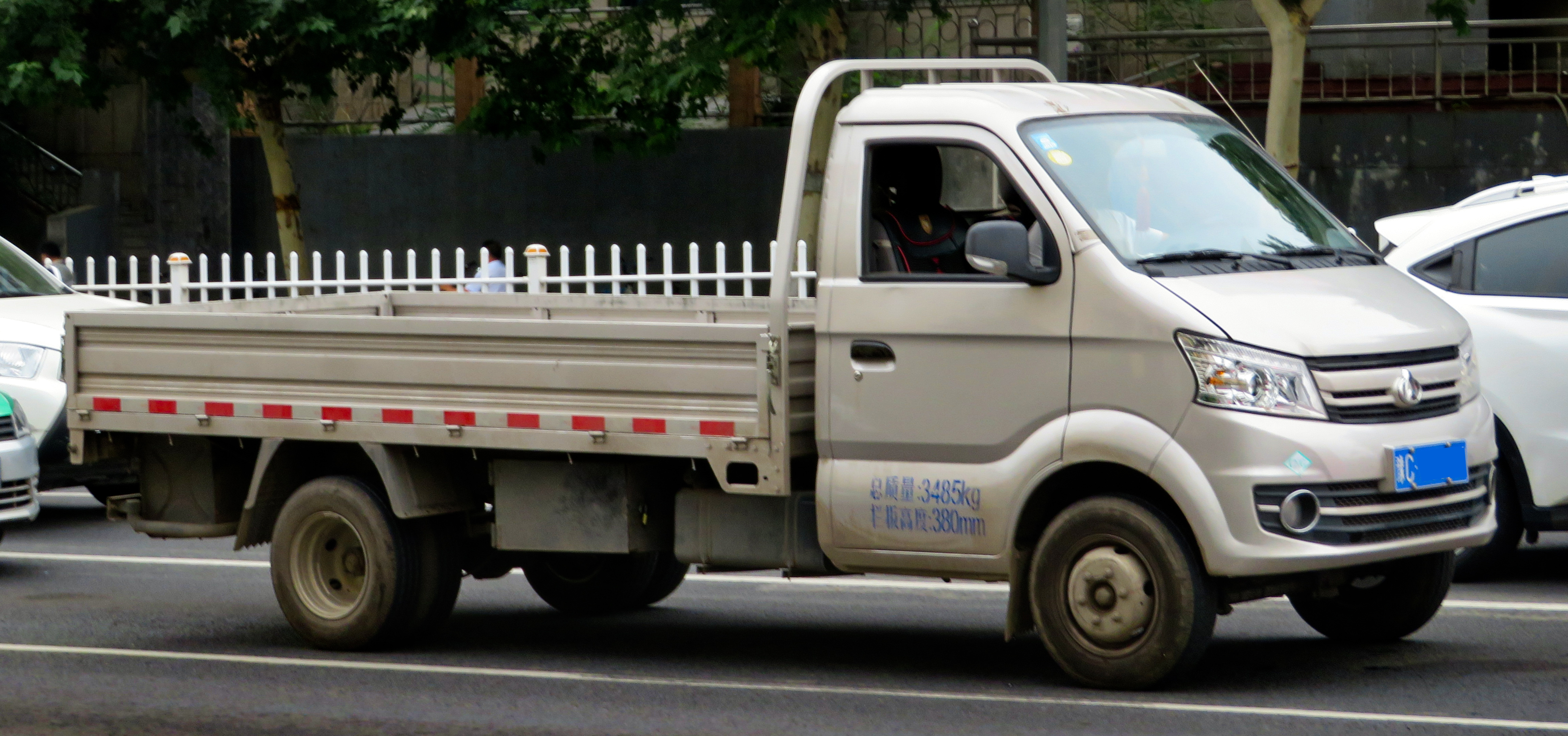
Kuayue Kuayuewang X5 facelift heavy duty long wheelbase

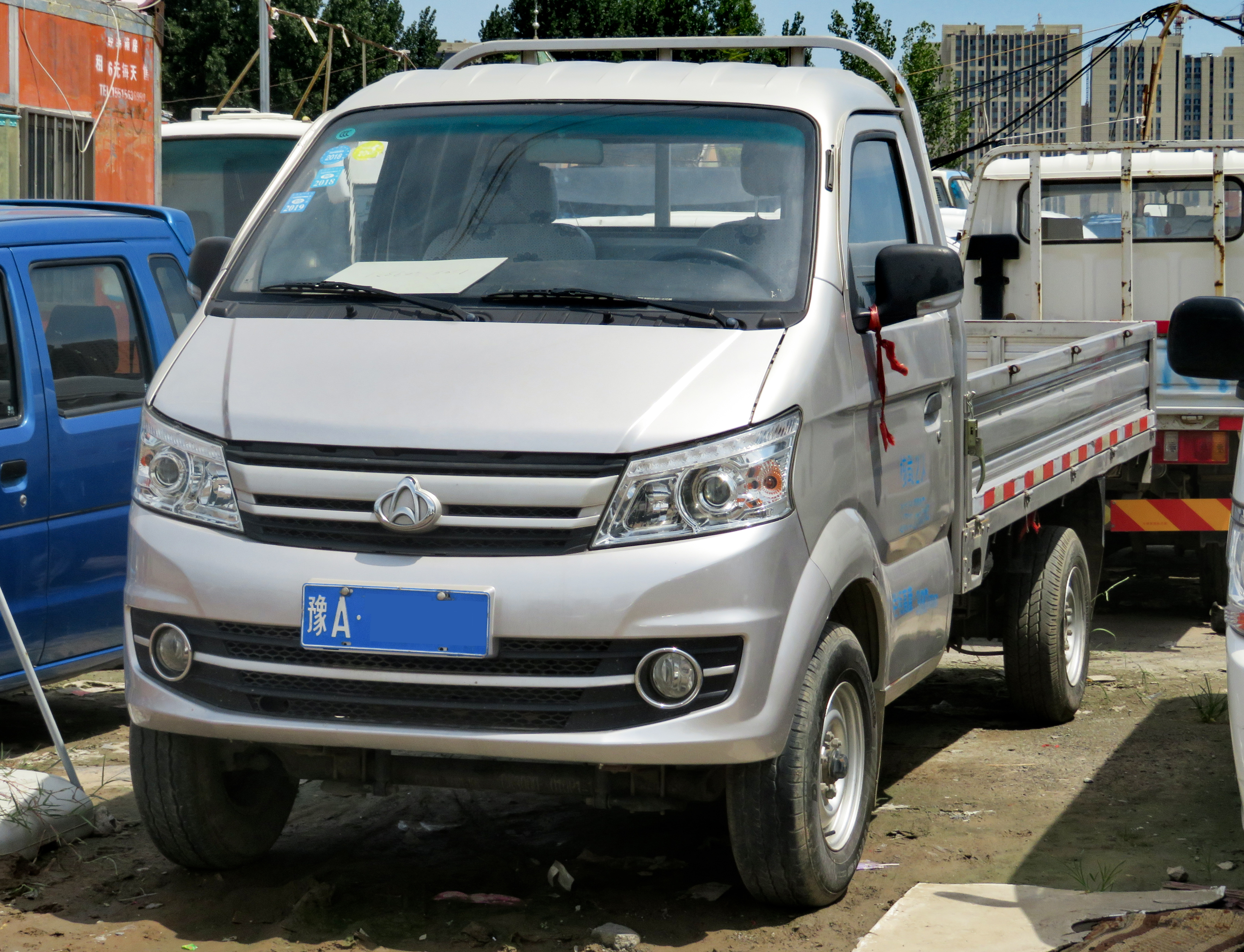
Kuayue Kuayuewang X5 facelift single cab drop side bed

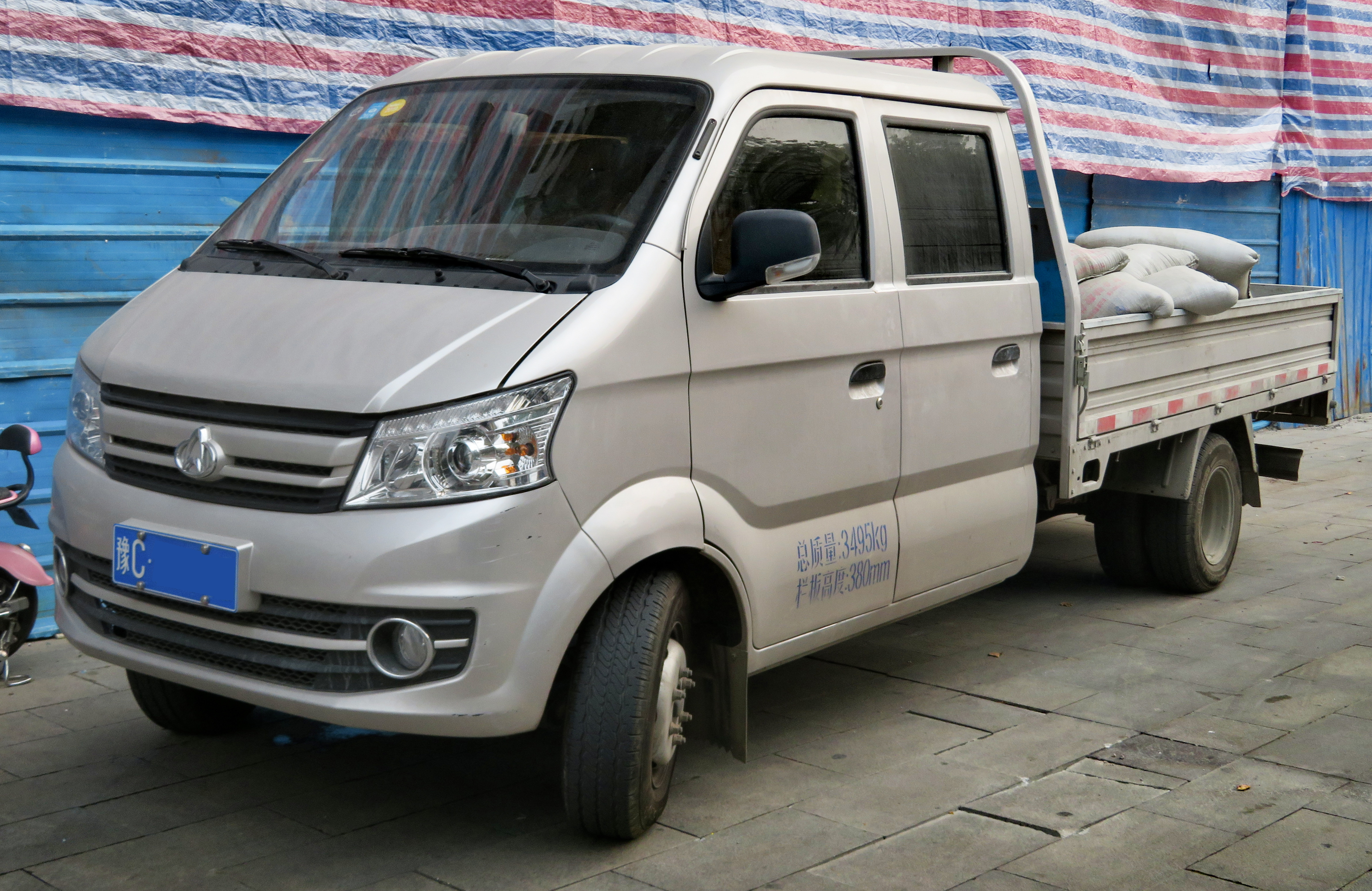
Kuayue Kuayuewang X5 facelift double cab
