= Foton Motor =

Chinese automobile company

BAIC Foton Motor Co., Ltd.
- Logo used since 2018

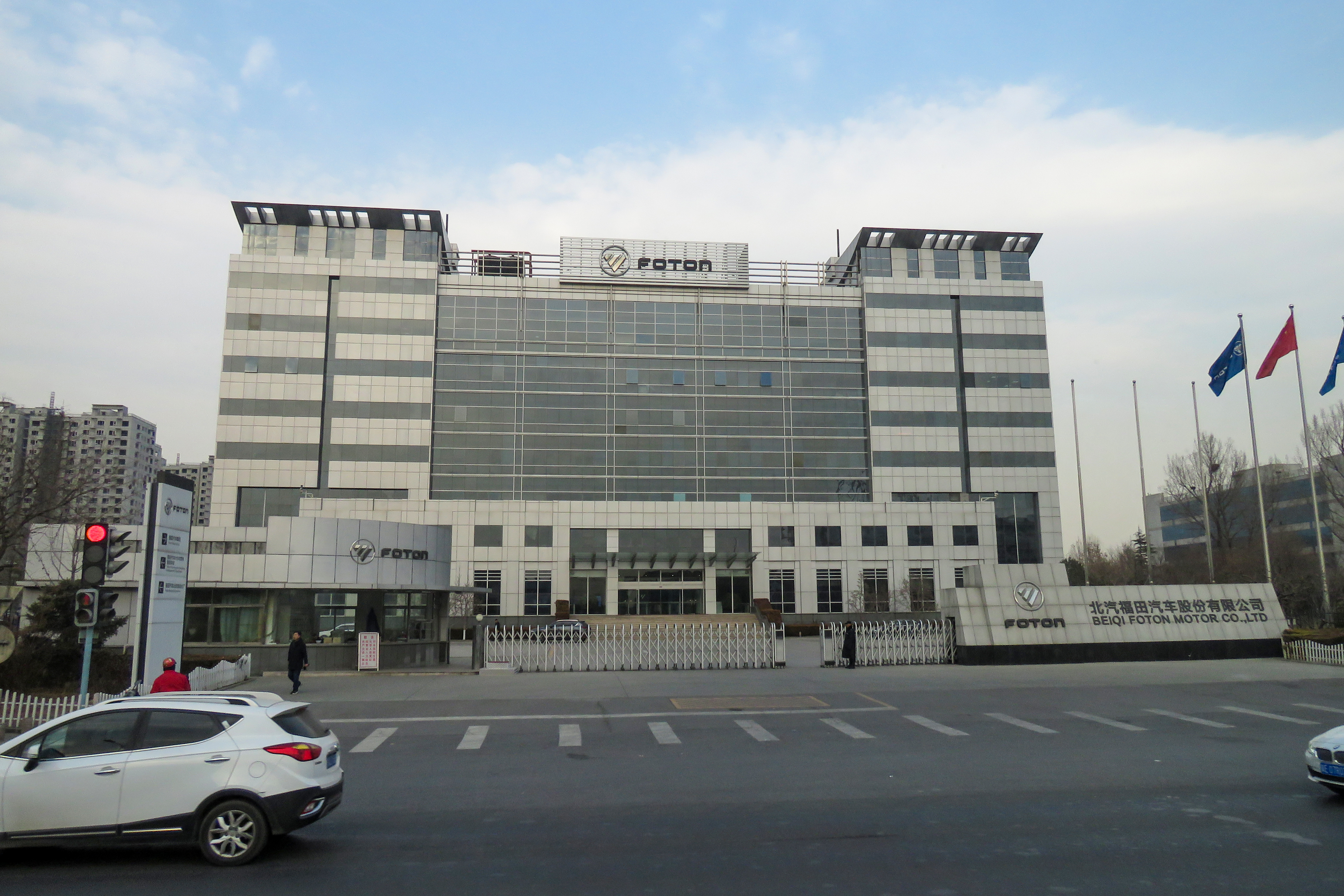
- Foton headquarters
- Native name: 福田汽车
- Type: Subsidiary
- Industry: Automotive
- Founded: 28 August 1996; 30 years ago
- Headquarters: Changping, Beijing, China
- Key people: Xiyong Zhang (Chairman); Yuequiong Gong (President & General Manager)
- Products: Automobiles; Commercial vehicles
- Revenue: 100,400,000,000 renminbi (2022)
- Net income: 5,900,000,000 renminbi (2022)
- Number of employees: ~40,000
- Parent: BAIC Group
- Subsidiaries: Beijing Foton Cummins Engine Co., Ltd. (50%); Beijing Foton Daimler Automotive Co., Ltd. (50%); Samhung Joint Venture Company

Chinese name
- Simplified Chinese: 北汽福田汽车股份有限公司
- Traditional Chinese: 北汽福田汽車股份有限公司
Transcriptions
Standard Mandarin
- Hanyu Pinyin: Běiqì Fútián Qìchē Gǔfèn Yǒuxiàn Gōngsī
- Website: foton-global.com

2013–2018

BAIC Foton Motor Co., Ltd. (Chinese: 北汽福田汽车股份有限公司; pinyin: Běiqì Fútián Qìchē Gǔfèn Yǒuxiàn Gōngsī), known as Foton Motor or Foton, is a Chinese company that designs and manufactures trucks, buses and sport utility vehicles. It is headquartered in Changping, Beijing, and is a subsidiary of the BAIC Group.

== History ==
Founded on August 28, 1996, Foton manufactures light and heavy-duty trucks, agricultural tractors, and various other machinery. Foton International Trade Co., Ltd, Beijing, is Foton Motor Group's international sales subsidiary.

In addition to the heavier trucks, Foton also builds a car inspired by the Toyota HiAce H100, called the "Foton View" or "Foton Alpha".

In August 2002, the company started producing Foton Auman truck.

In March 2006, Foton and Cummins Inc. announced the creation of a 50:50 joint venture company, Beijing Foton Cummins Engine Company (BFCEC), to produce light-duty diesel engines, of 2.8 and 3.8 liter displacement.

In October 2009, Foton agreed to form a joint venture to develop and produce vehicle batteries with Pulead Technology Industry Co.

In July 2010, Foton announced the establishment of a European headquarters in Moscow, Russia.

Foton established a sales company in India in April 2011.

In February 2012, Beiqi Foton Motors Co., Ltd. and Daimler AG established a 50-50 joint venture, Beijing Foton Daimler Automotive Co., Ltd., at an investment of RMB6.35 billion. The joint venture would take over Foton's existing Auman medium- and heavy-duty truck business, including production sites, sales and service network.

Foton will build an assembly plant in Colombia, in order to participate in the growing Latin American market for light commercial vehicles. The company also plans to build a plant in Western Maharashtra, India.

Foton has announced a bus factory in Brazil in the state of Bahia, as part of their globalization plan. Foton has held a press conference in 2015, previewing the Sauvana while announcing news to bring the brand to the United States.

In September 2017, Foton and Piaggio agreed to form a joint venture to develop and produce light commercial vehicle. Based on Foton chassis the new vehicle was sold by Piaggio Commercial Vehicle division in Europe and in all market around the world but not in China. The vehicle was intended as a successor of the Piaggio Porter and production was planned to starts in the mid 2019 in Pontedera (Italy) with all components produced by Foton in China.

In August 2018, Foton Motor announced they would set up a plant in Bangladesh by next year to assemble commercial vehicles in a joint venture with ACI Motors.

On 25 April 2019, Foton and CP has announced a truck factory in Thailand name CP FOTON SALES CO., LTD. Now have the electric truck name Auman EST, AUMARK and AUV.

In 2024, a joint partnership was established with Otokar of Turkey, including local production.

In December 2024, Cavan Auto (卡文汽车), a new energy commercial vehicle brand jointly owned by Foton Motor, Bosch, SinoHytec, and BAIC Capital, was launched. Cavan products are sold as a sub-brand of Foton, with the first product being the Lefu (乐福) van, unveiled alongside the Beacon, a concept heavy-duty truck. The Lefu is based on the Toano View i9 electric van.

== Operations ==
Foton is headquartered in Changping District, Beijing. Foton's business units are seen in cities and provinces such as Beijing, Tianjin, Shandong, Hebei, Hunan, Hubei, Liaoning, and Guangdong. Its R&D branches are distributed in India, Japan, Germany, Taiwan and the Philippines. It has assets exceeding 50 billion Yuan and 300,000 employees. Foton, whose brand value exceeds 61.932 billion Yuan in 2005, ranked No.1 in auto industry and No. 11 in the “Top 500 Most Valuable Brands”.

Foton business marquee also consists of a branch in Ulaanbaatar, Mongolia. Och motors LLC, is one of the biggest conglomerate in Mongolia, is the official distributor of Foton in Mongolian market.

=== North Korea ===
Foton manufactures vehicles in Hanghang district, Pyongyang in the Samhung Joint Venture Company factory, Foton Vehicles in North Korea are sold under the Chonji Marque.

== Products ==
=== Buses ===
Foton AUV (福田欧辉)

- Foton AUV New Directions (since 2000; Original name: 新干线欧V)
- Foton AUV panoramic Unlimited (since 2003; Original name: 全景无限)
- Foton AUV Pioneer Europe (since 1998; Original name: 欧V先锋) Brand name
- Foton Green Earth (Using city bus in Gangneung, South Korea. It was introduced in 2018 Pyeongchang Olympics.)
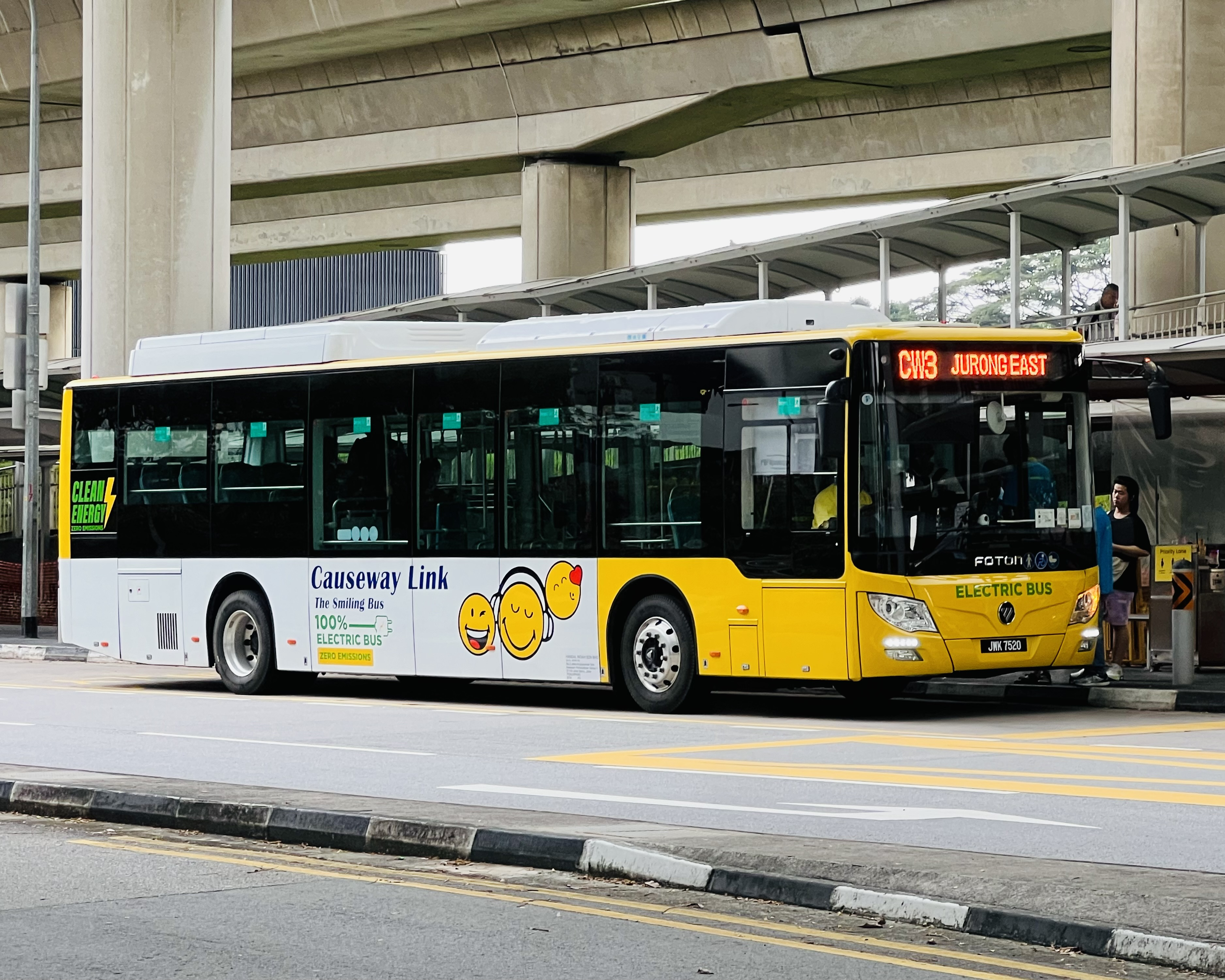
Foton BJ6123EVCA electric bus in service with Causeway Link

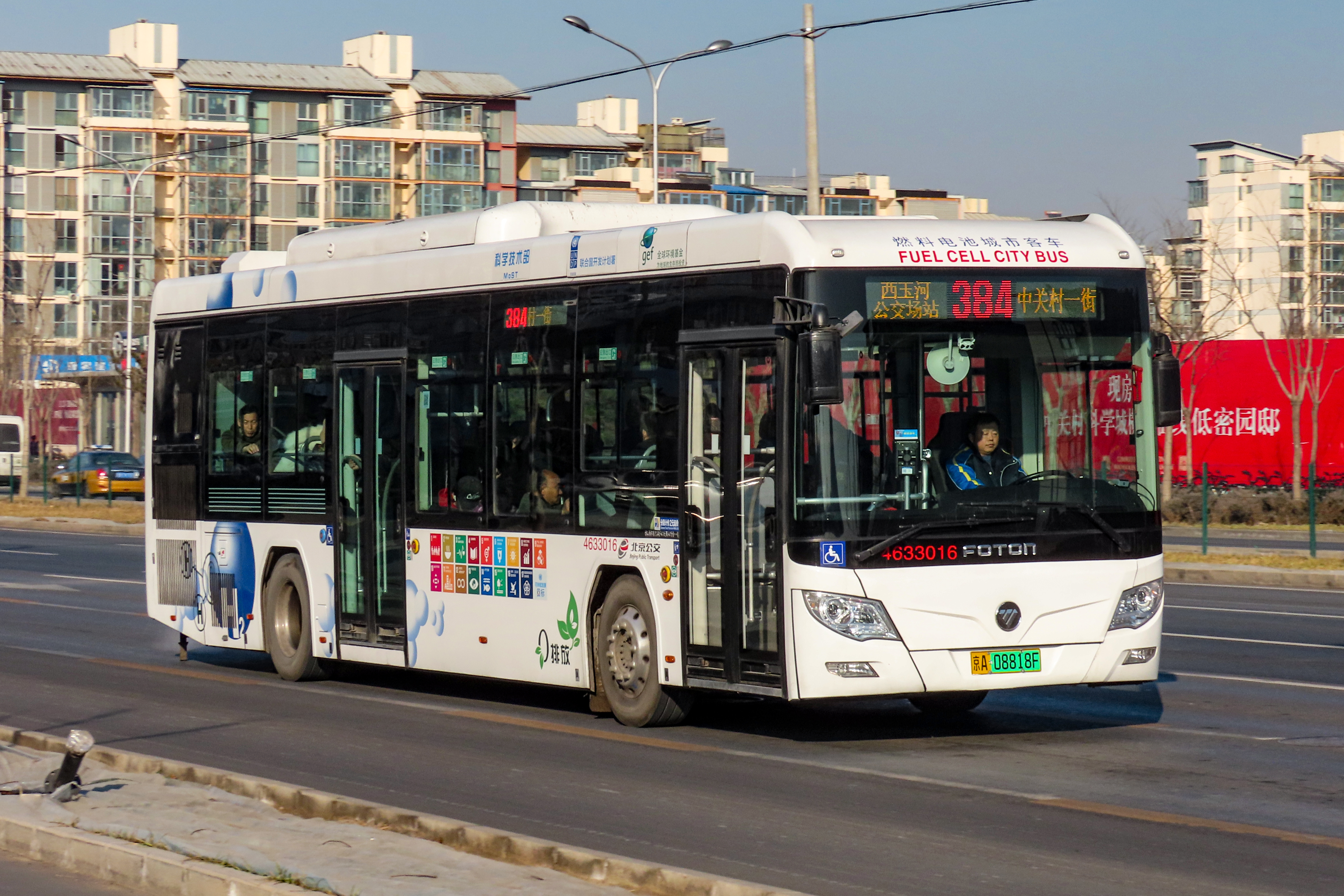
Foton BJ6123FCEVCH-1 fuel cell bus running in Malianwa Subdistrict, Haidian District, Beijing

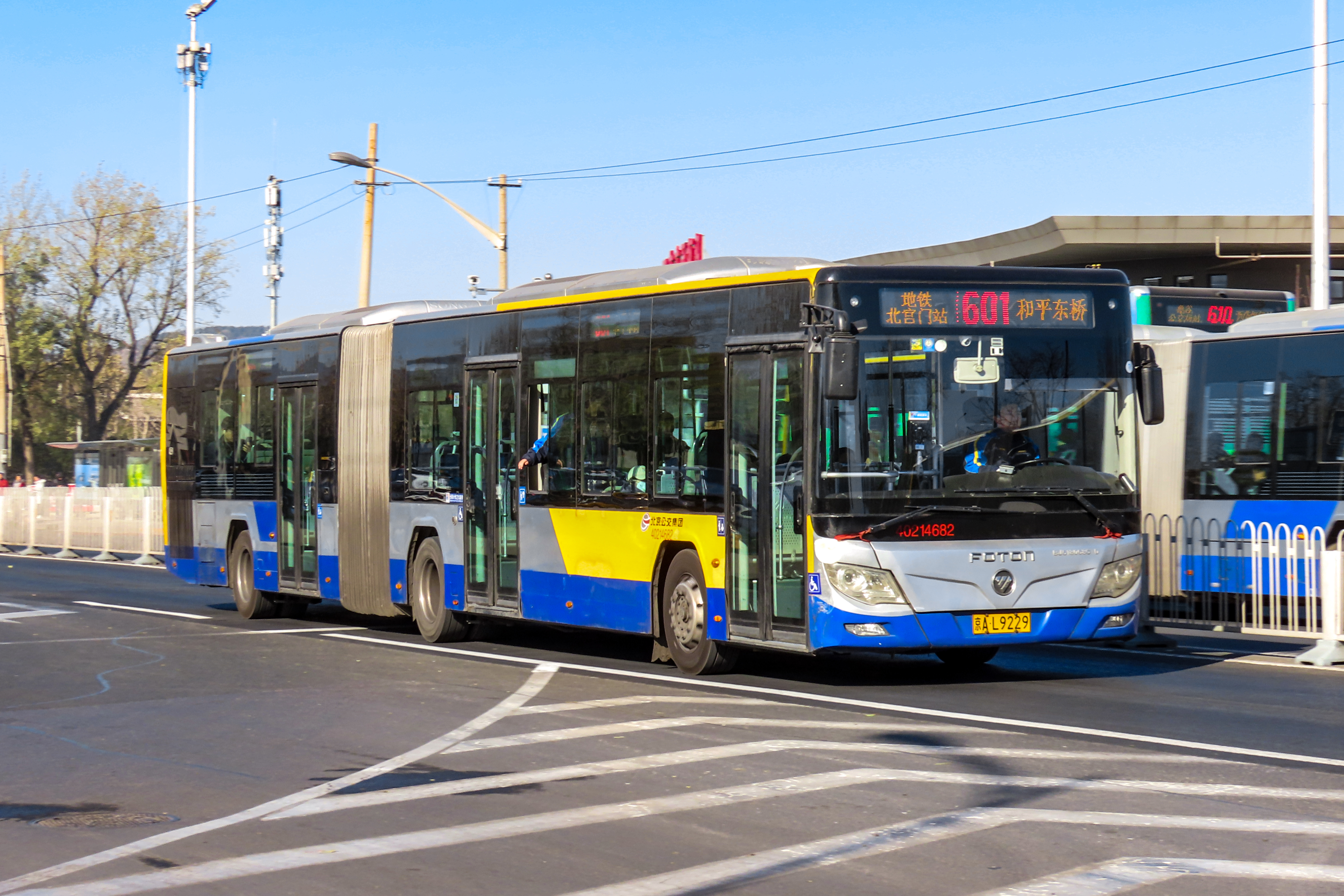
Foton BJ6180C8CTD articulated LNG bus in Beijing Bus service

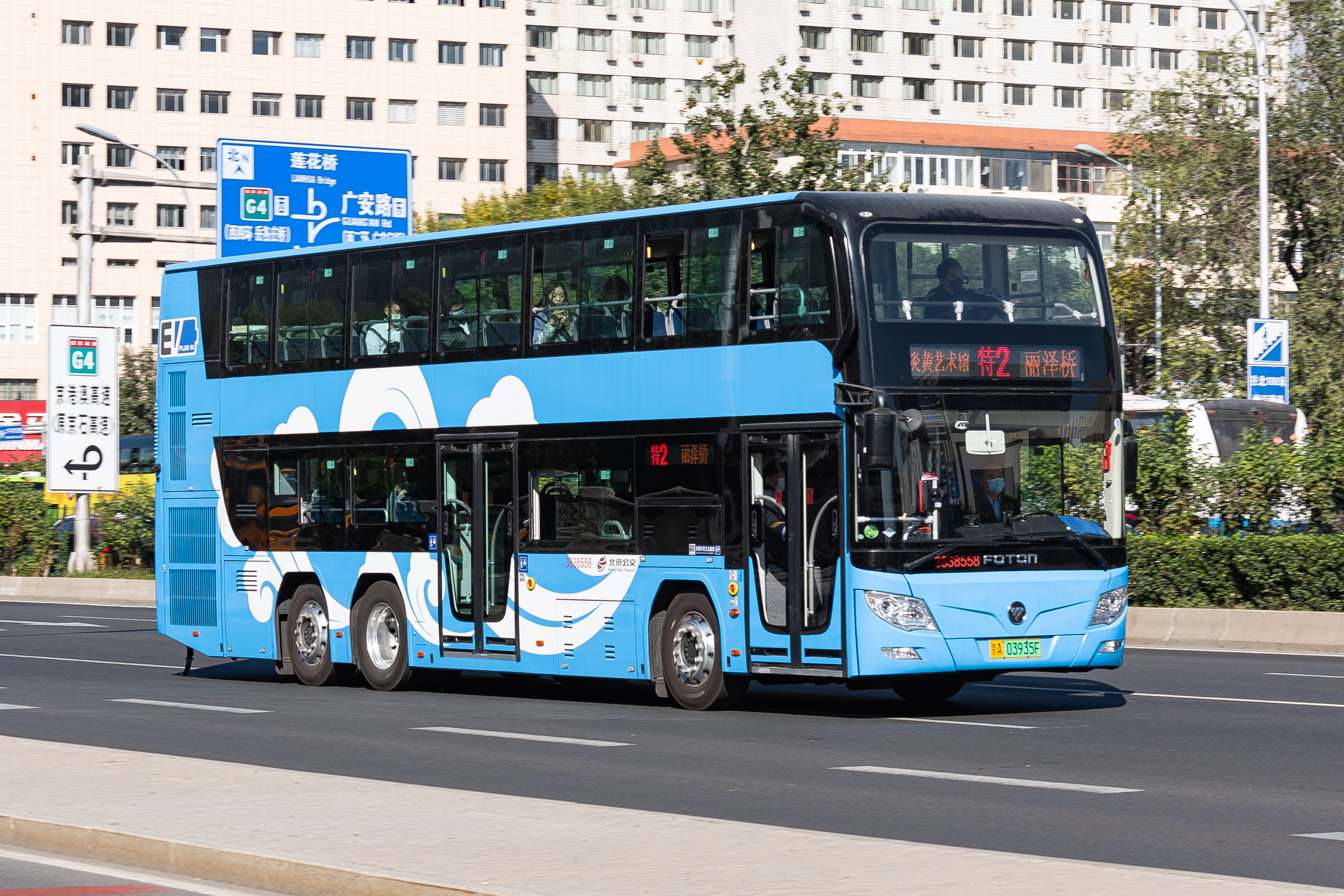
Foton BJ6128SHEVCA-5 plug-in hybrid double-decker bus in Liuliqiao, Beijing

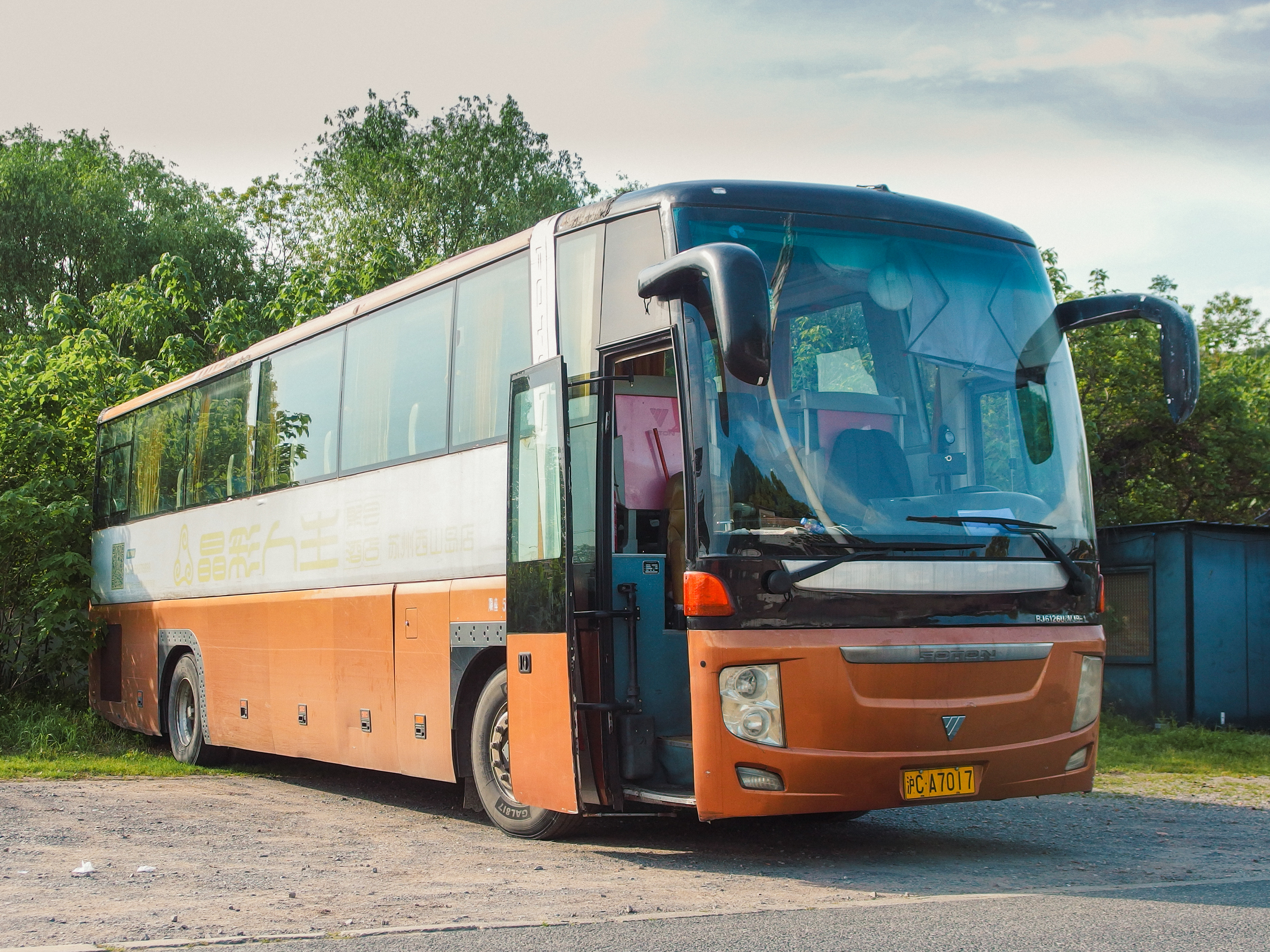
Foton BJ6126U8MJB-1

=== Heavy duty trucks ===
Foton Auman (福田欧曼)

- Foton Auman Jones (since 2003, under license of Mercedes-Benz trucks; Original name: 欧曼奇兵)
- Foton Auman Lion (since 2003, under license of Mercedes-Benz trucks; Original name: 欧曼雄狮)
- Foton Auman Kunlun Mountains (since 2003, under license of Mercedes-Benz trucks; Original name: 欧曼昆仑)
- Foton Auman Shenzhou (since 2003, under license of Mercedes-Benz trucks; Original name: 欧曼神舟)
- Foton Auman H4 (since 2011)
- Foton Auman EST

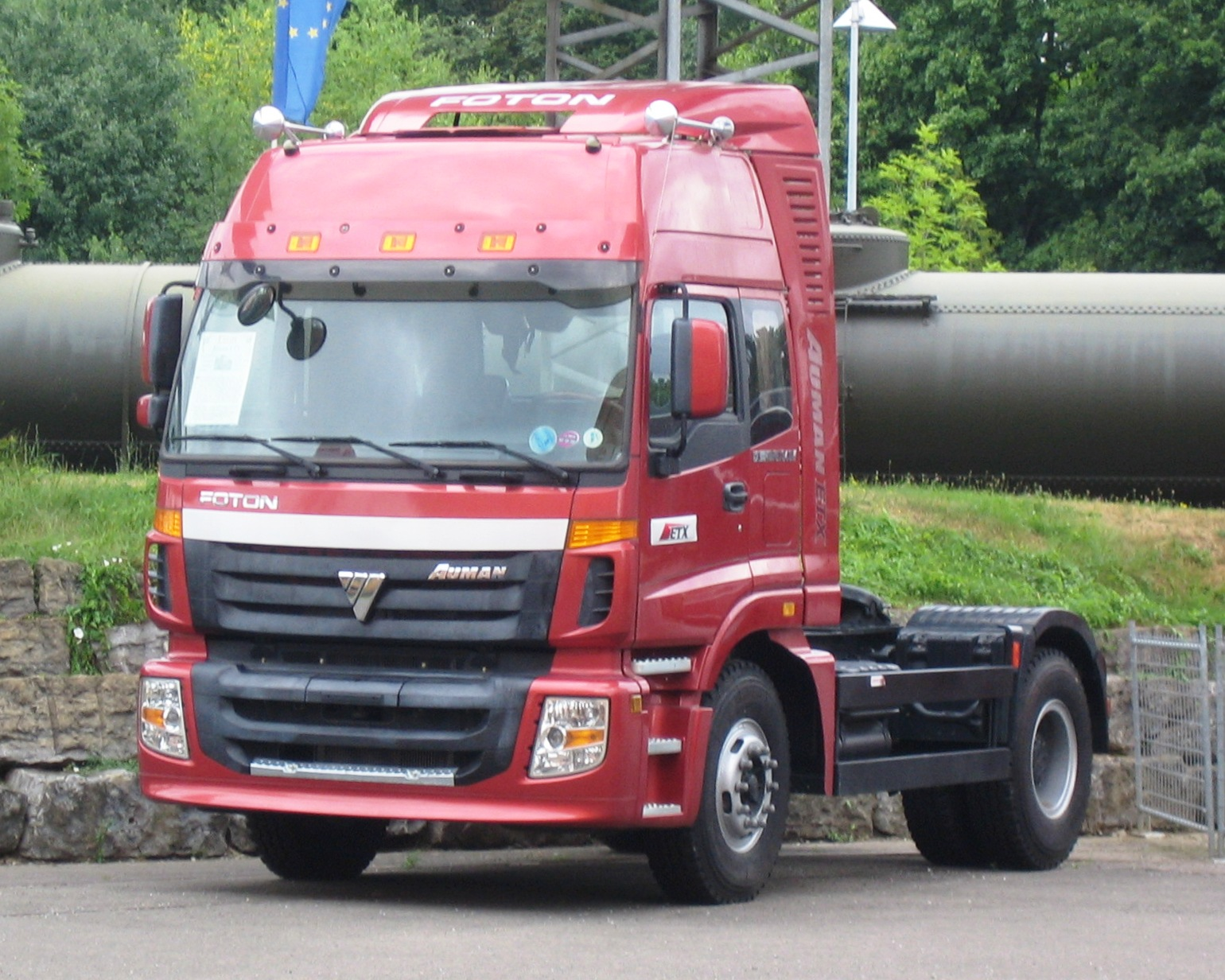
Foton Auman

=== Light duty trucks ===
Foton light duty truck (3.5/ 4.5 tons) are sold under the Aumark and Ollin series.

- Foton Aumark (since 2005, Original name: 欧马可)
- Foton Aumark S/ Foton Aumark Flex
  - Foton Aumark S1/ Foton Tornado (龙卷风)
- Foton Aumark C (Discontinued)
- Foton Miler (Previously Foton Ollin M)
- Foton Ollin Beyond (since 2005, Original name: 奥铃超越)
- Foton Ollin MRI (since 2005, Original name: 奥铃捷运)
- Foton Ollin V
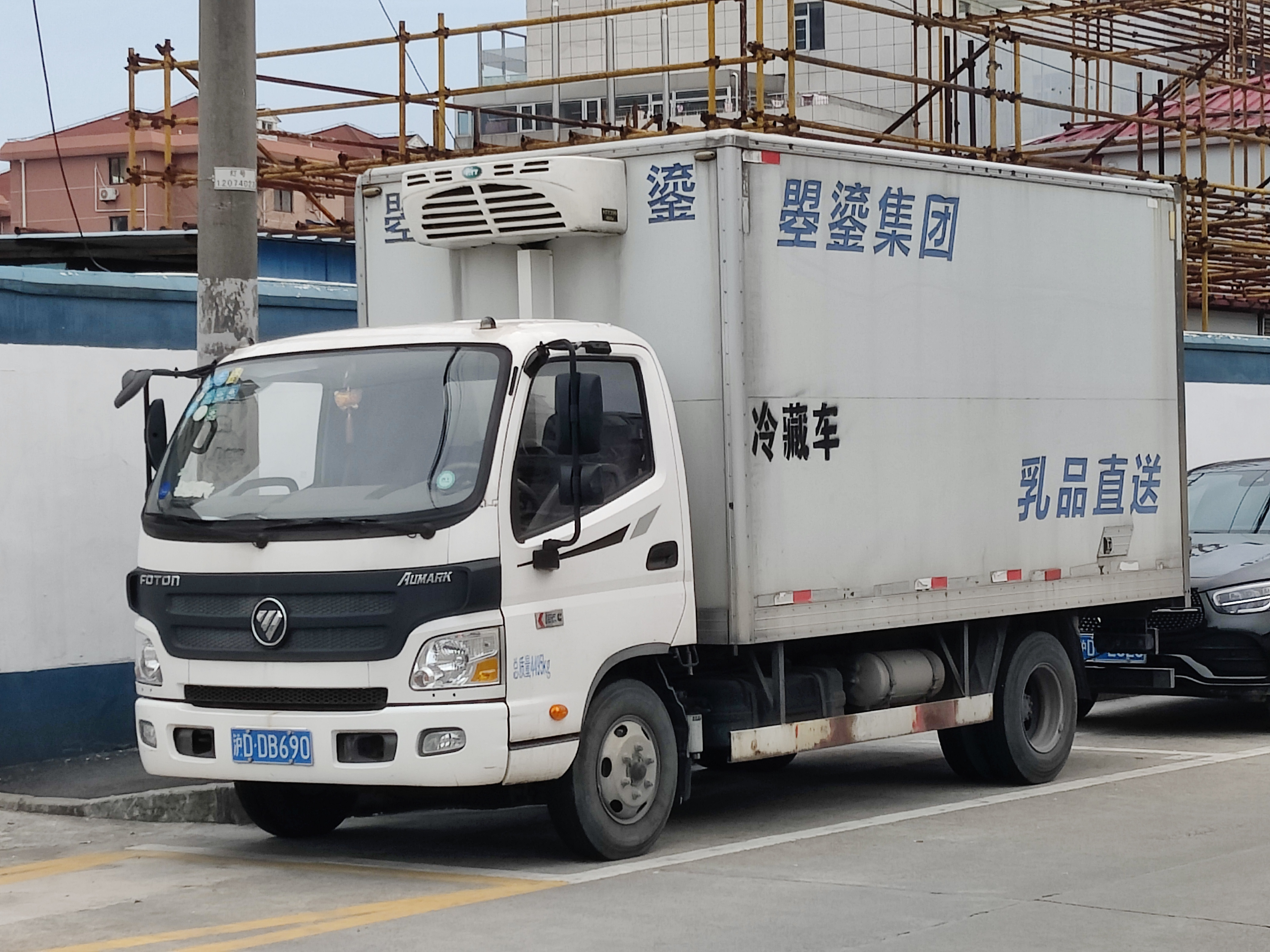
Foton Aumark C

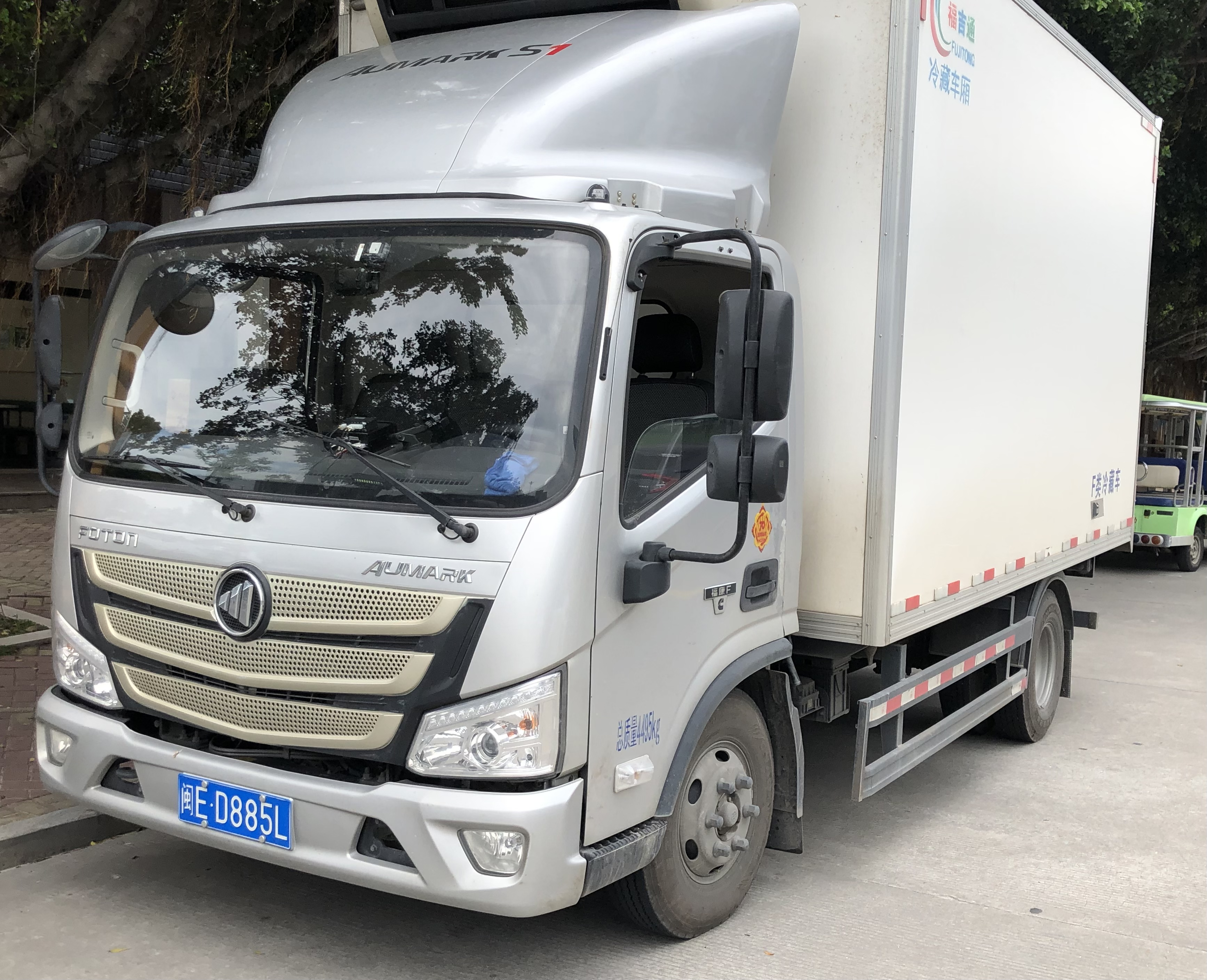
Foton Aumark S1

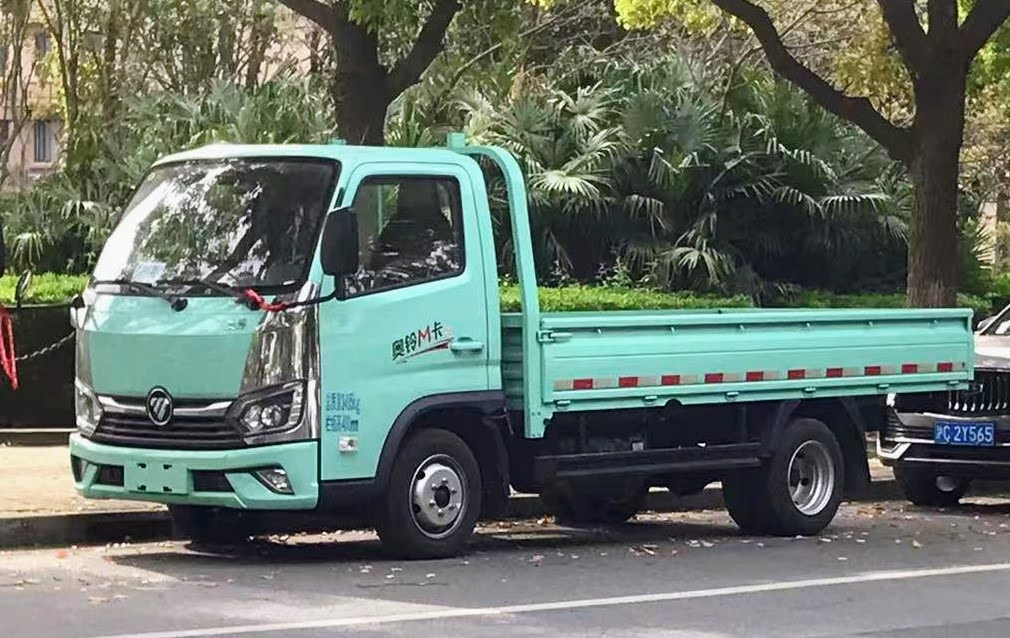
Foton Ollin M

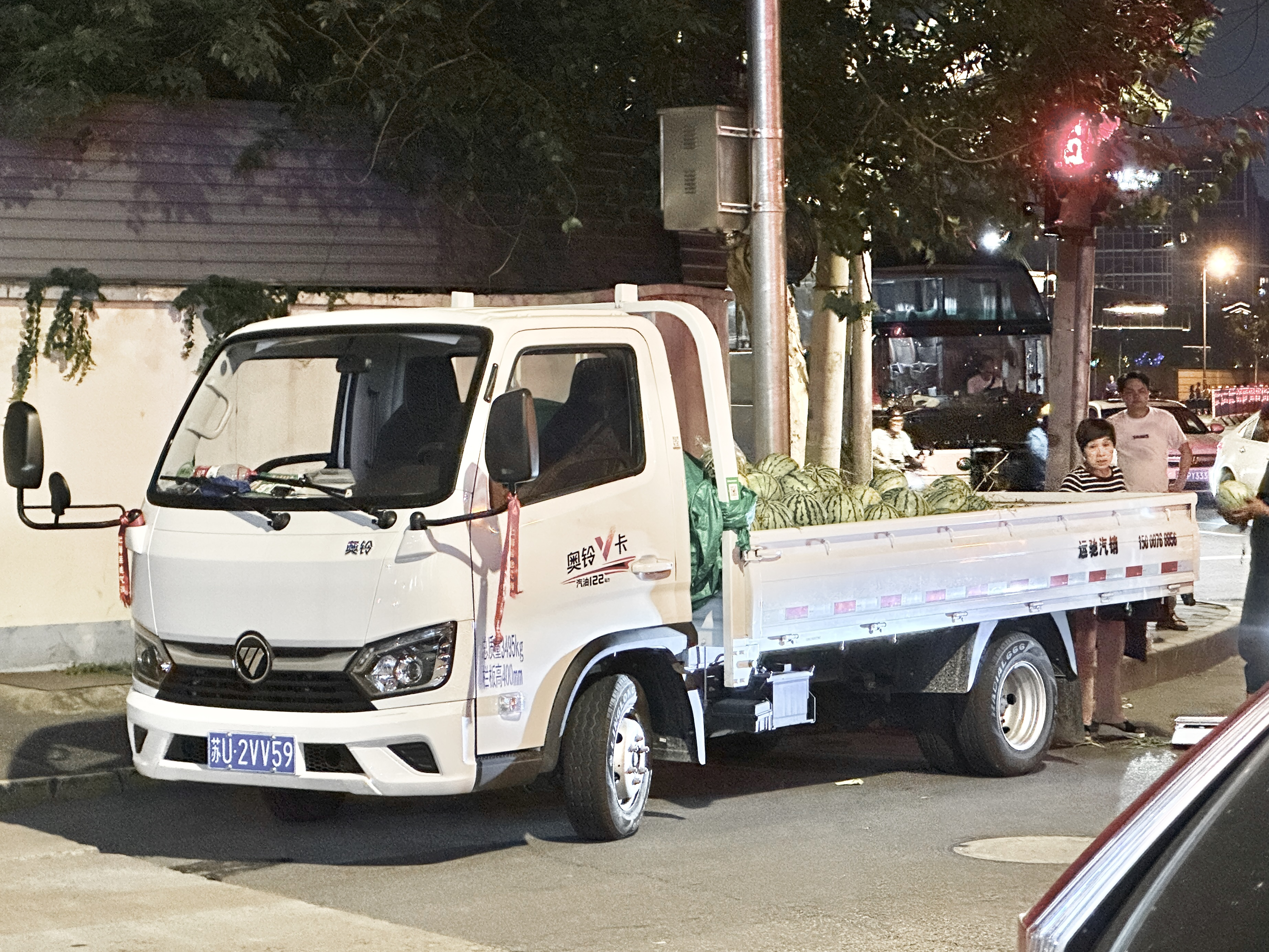
Foton Ollin V

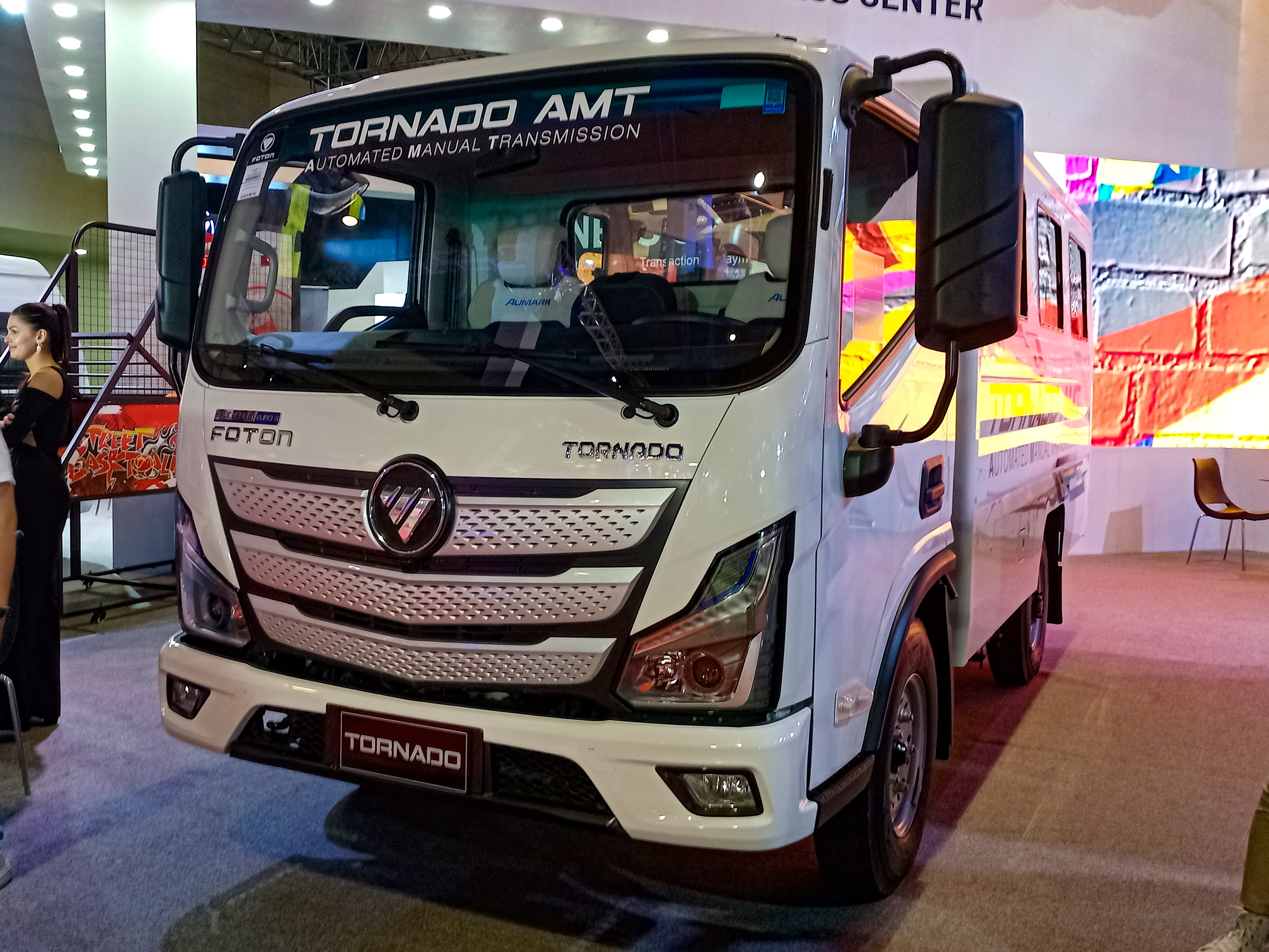
Foton Tornado

=== Foton Toano (图雅诺) ===
Foton Toano series is mainly focused on light passenger and commercial vans.

- Foton Toano (since 2015) business class van/ minibus
- Foton Toano Grand-V (since 2024) business class van
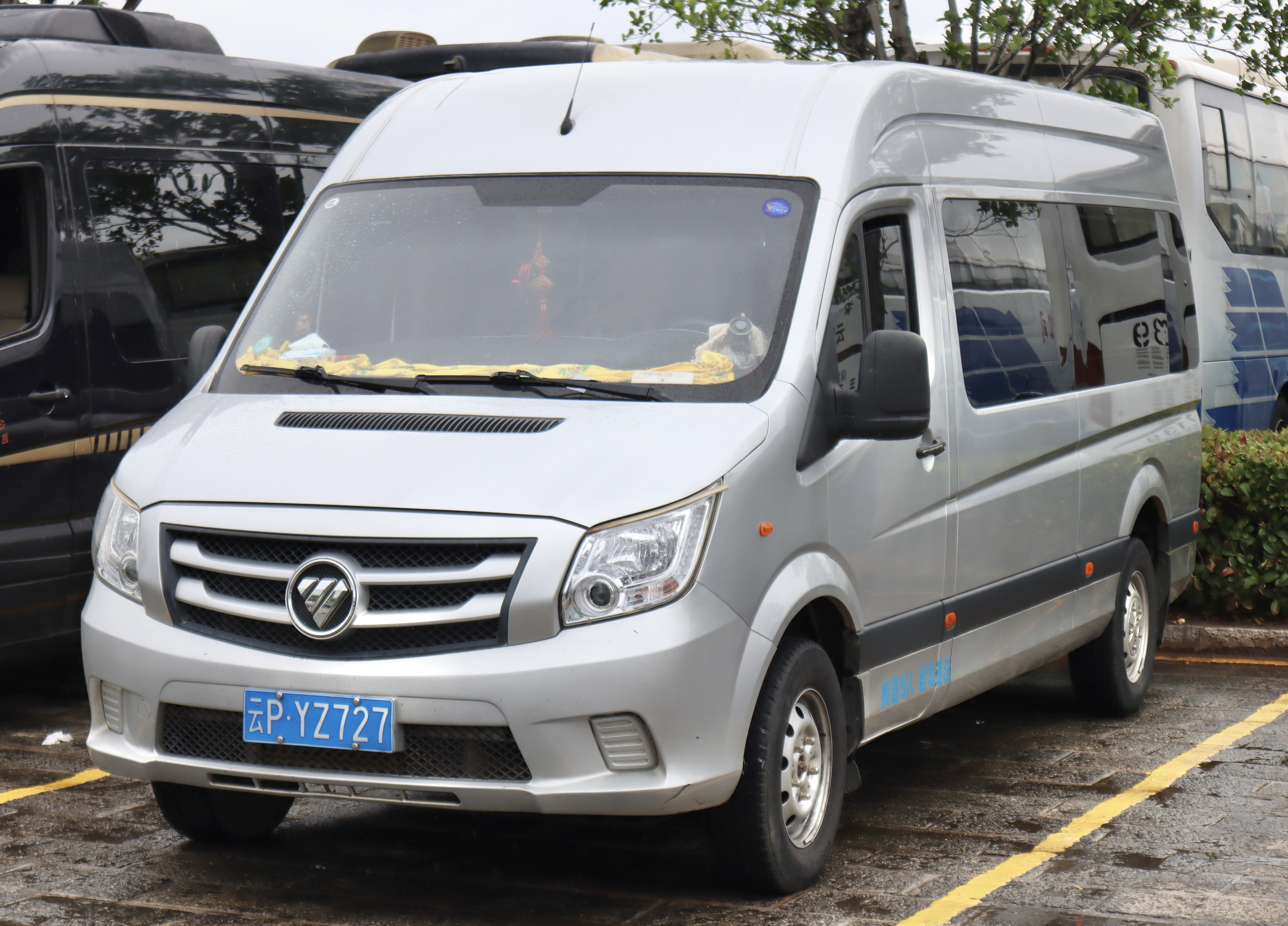
Foton Toano

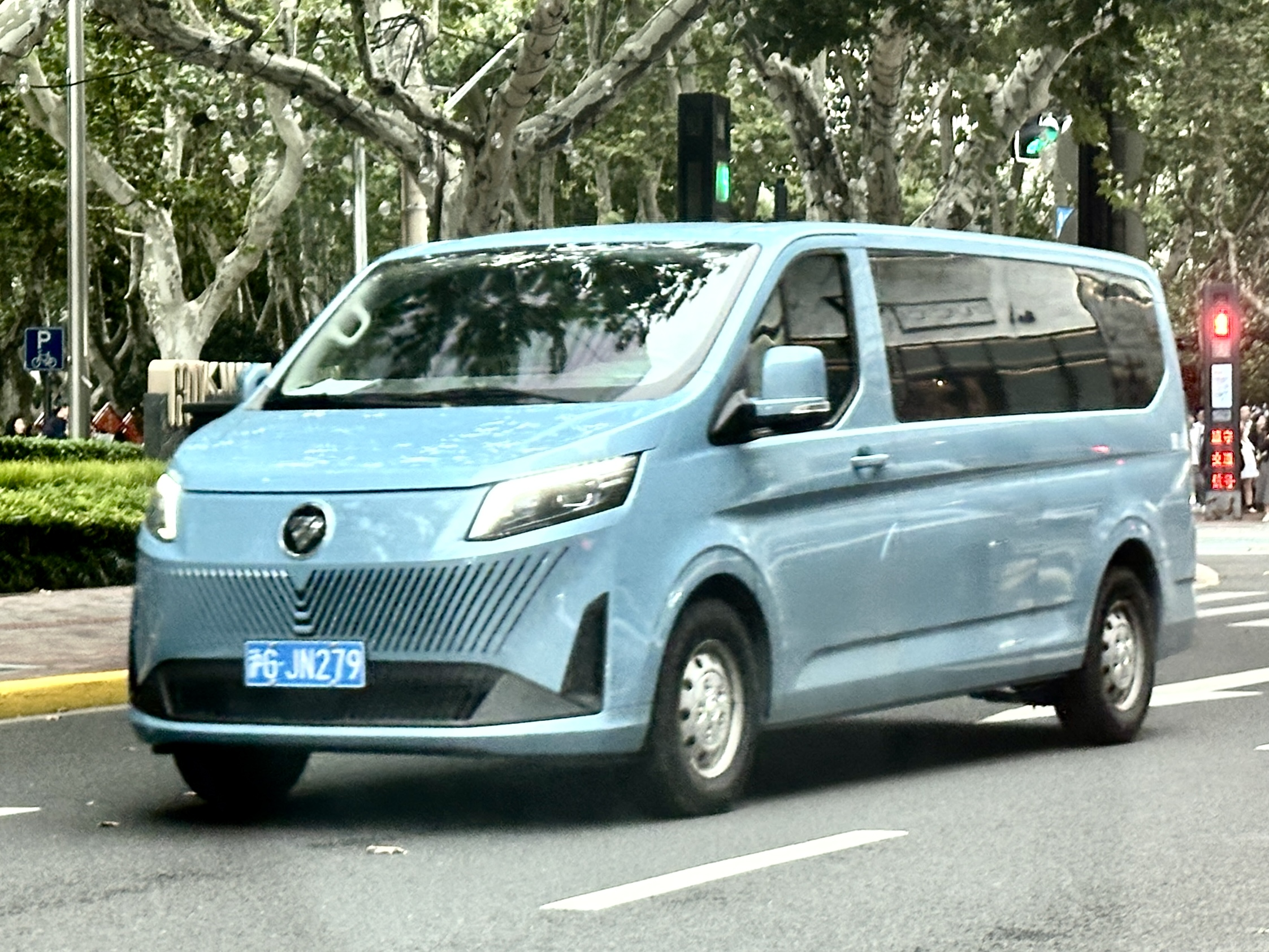
Foton Toano Grand V

=== Foton View (福田风景) ===
Foton View is mainly focused on vans and van based micro-trucks for the logistics market.

Foton View

- Foton View G9 (since 2004 heavily resembling the Toyota HiAce as the high top version)
- Foton View G7 (Also known as CS2; since 2004 heavily resembling the Toyota HiAce as the low top version)
- Foton View G5/ Foton MP-X (MP-X蒙派克) MPV, Foton MP-X Parker Mongolia (since 2005; Original name: MP-X蒙派克)
- Foton View i9 electric van
- Foton View i7 electric van
- Foton View V3 microvan (Rebadged Gratour van)

Foton Zhilan (Smart Smurf)

- Foton Smart Smurf E5/ E7
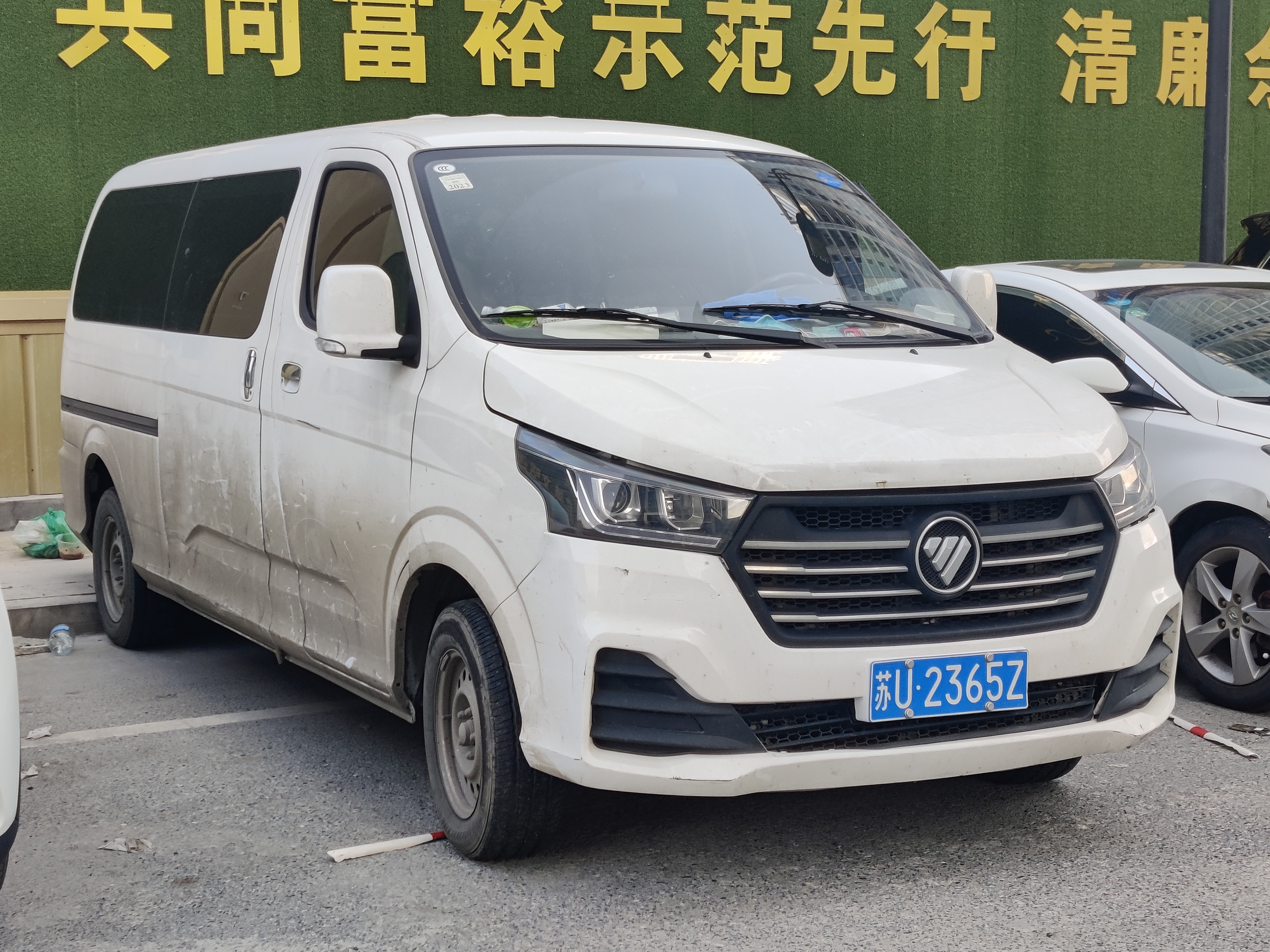
Foton View G5

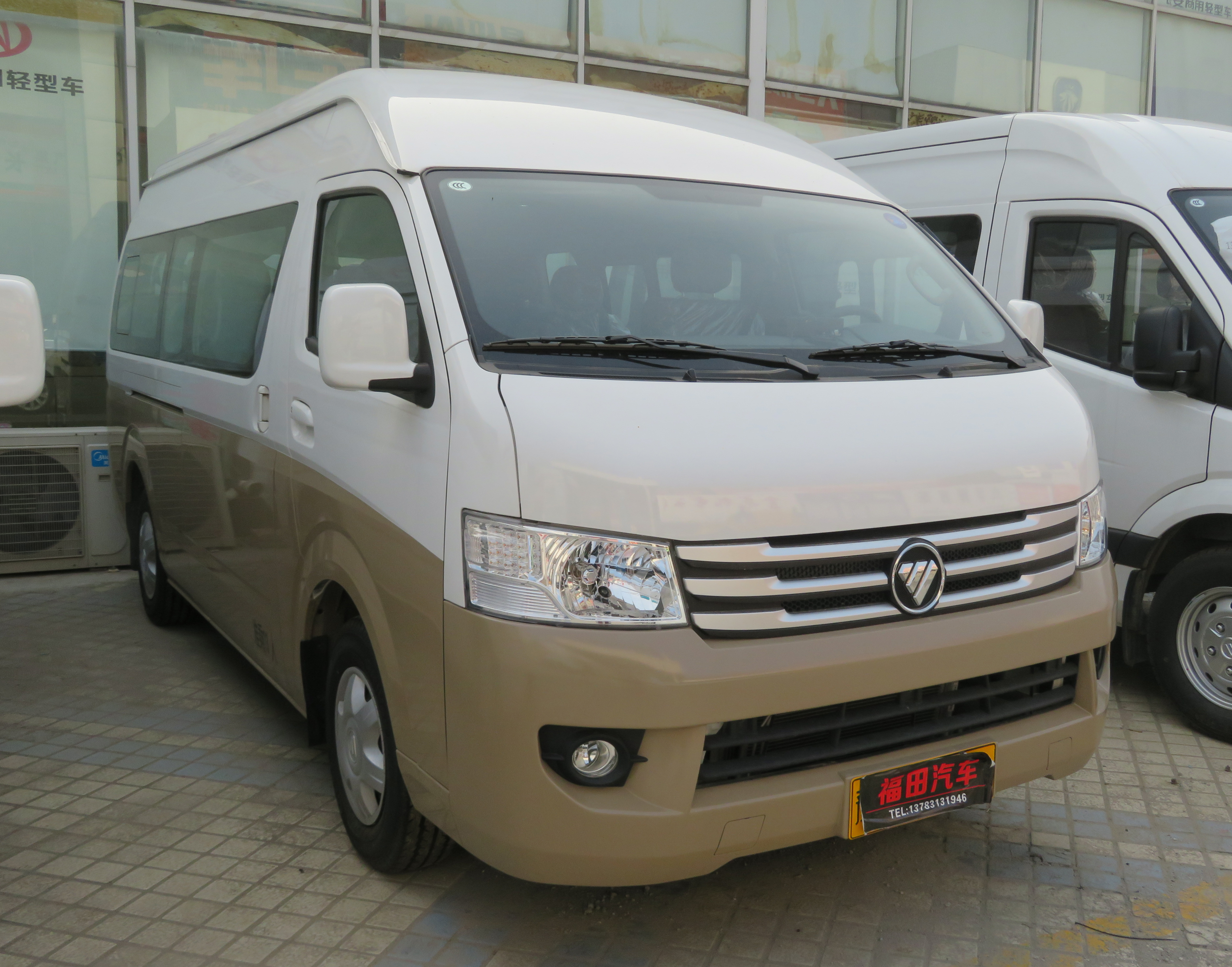
Foton View G9

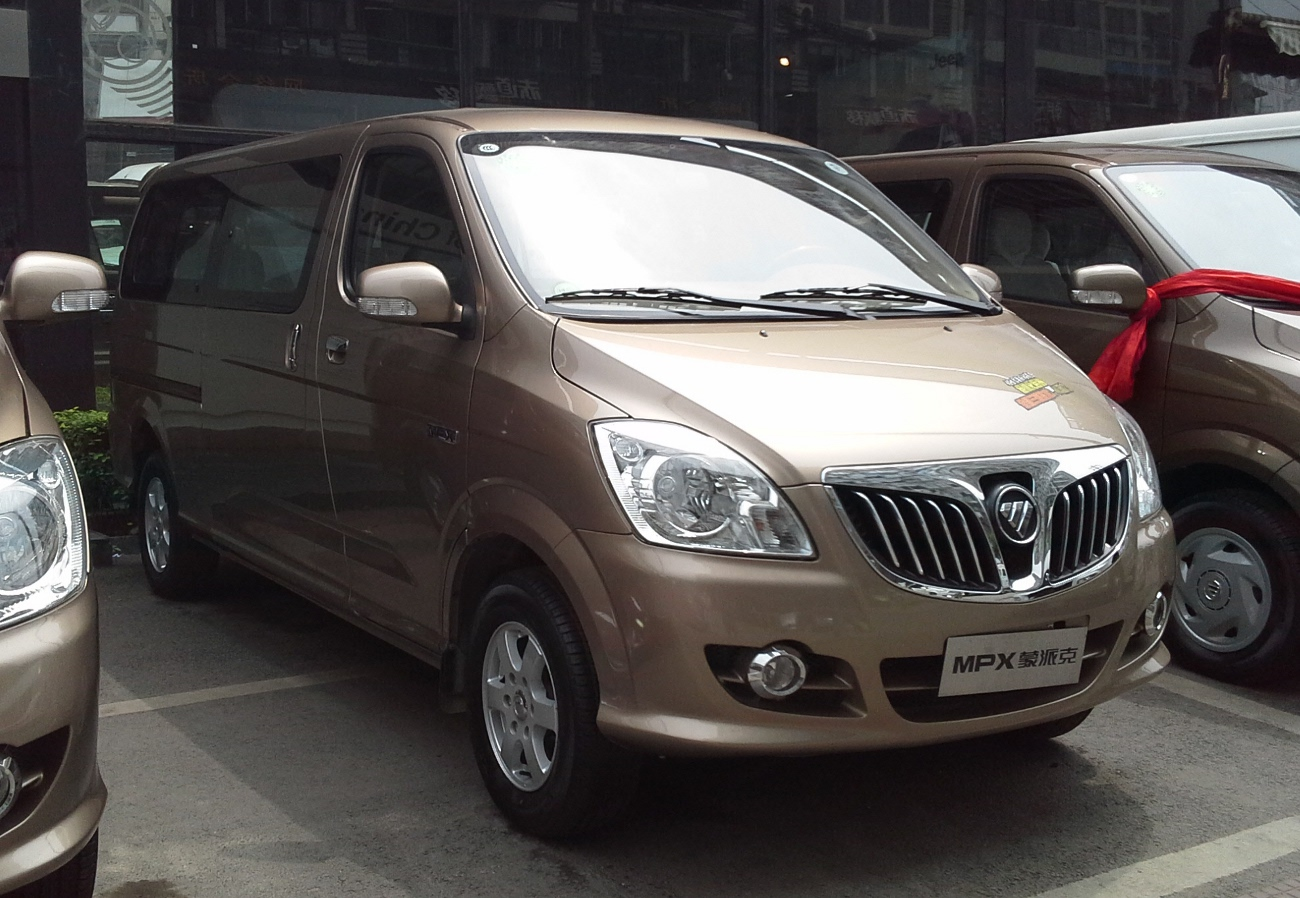
Foton MP-X

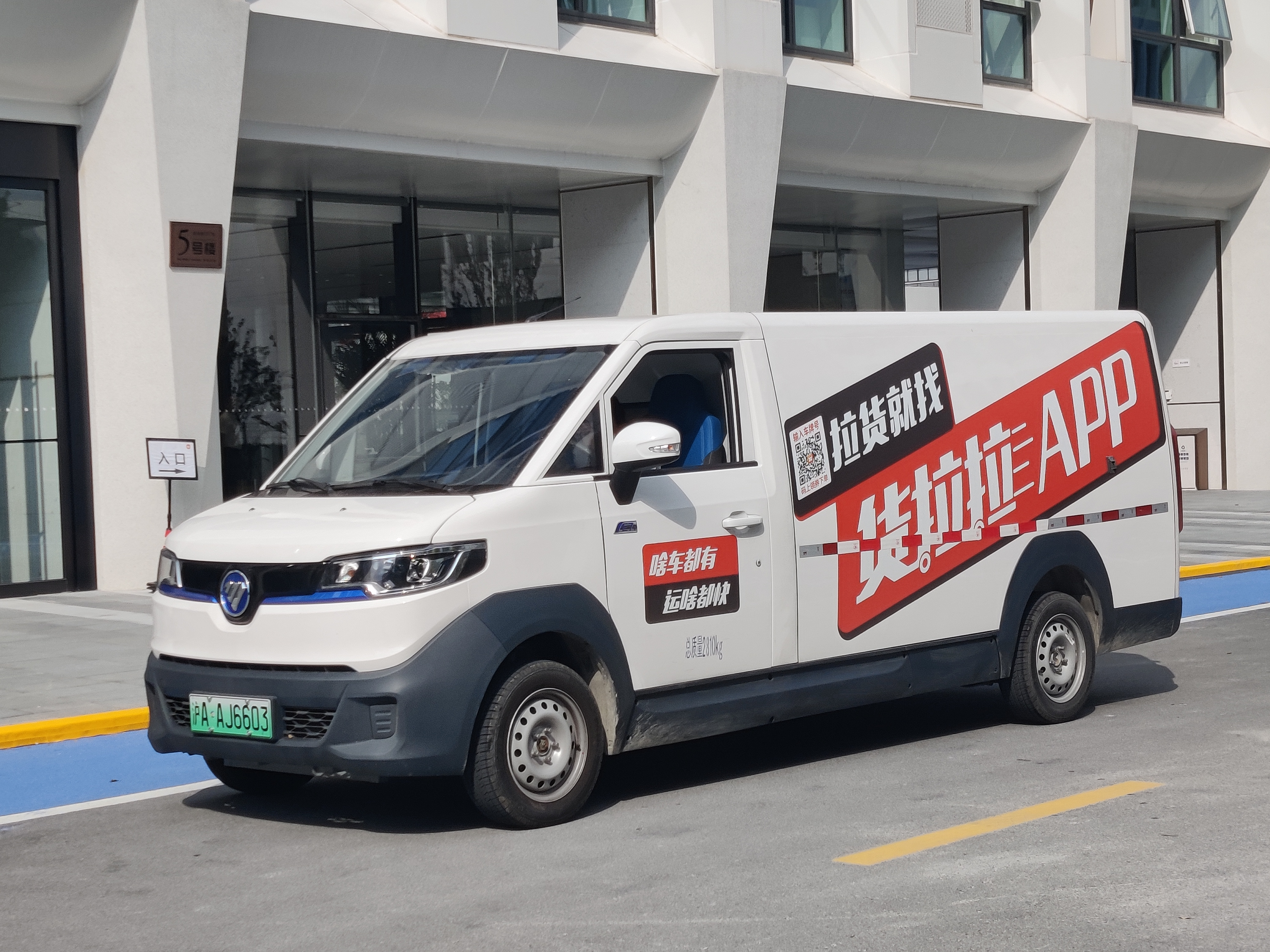
Foton Smart Smurf E5/ E7

=== Foton Cavan (卡文) ===
Foton Cavan is Foton's electric micro-truck and micro-van brand.

- Foton Cavan Lefu (乐福) electric van based on the View i9
- Foton Cavan Letu (乐途) electric light truck
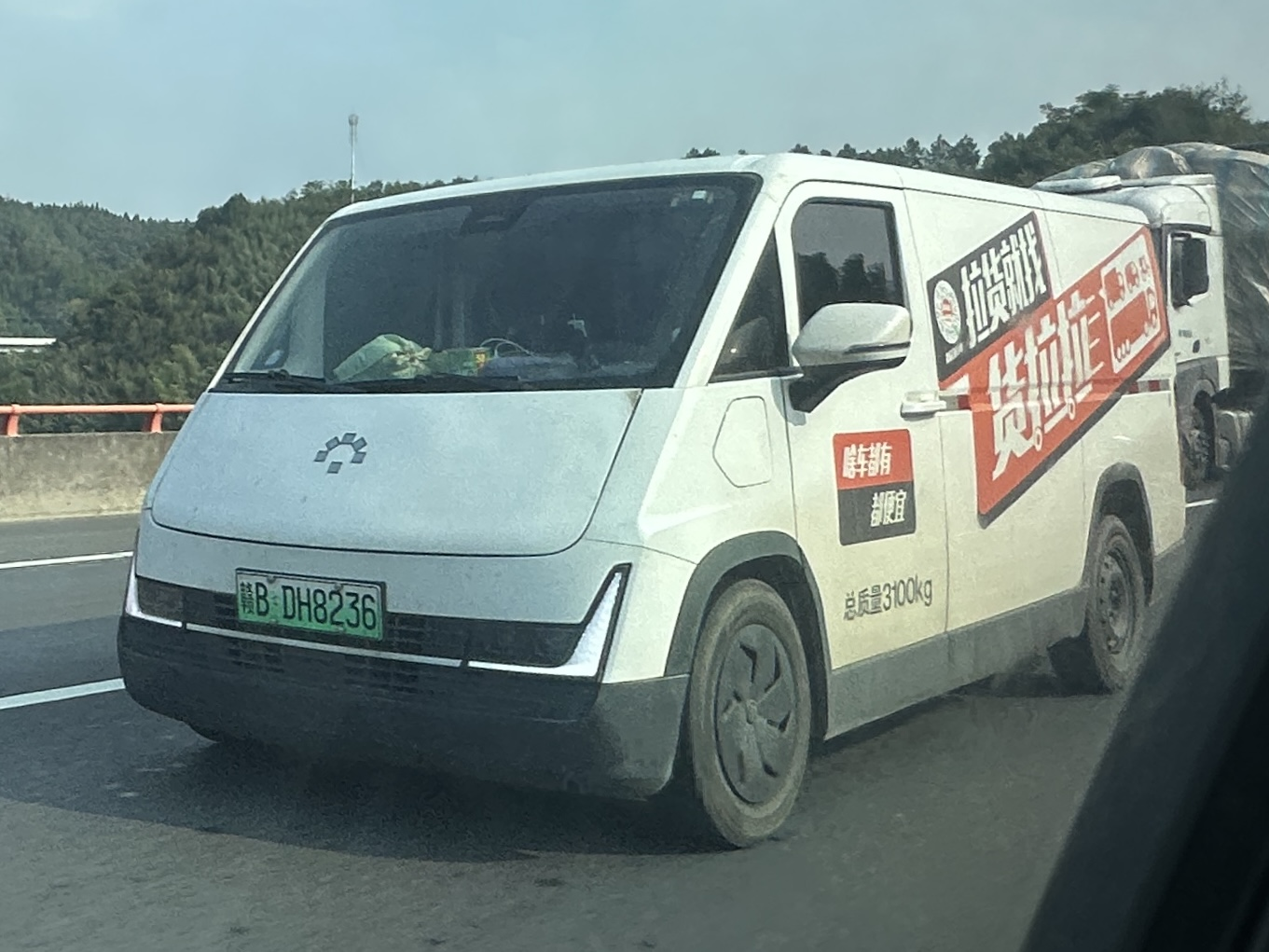
Foton Cavan Lefu

Foton Cavan Letu

=== Foton Tunland Pickups ===
Foton's pickup series started with the mechanically Isuzu-based Saga SUV and the SUP pickup.With the self developed Tunland pickup series succeeding with the Tunland pickup and the Sauvana SUV. The Tunland pickup later derived into several variants.

Foton Sauvana SUV (萨瓦纳) (since 2014; also known as Foton Toplander) (Discontinued)

Foton Tunland (拓陆者) pickup

- Foton Tunland E3
- Foton Tunland E5
- Foton Tunland S

Foton Tunland Yutu (拓陆者 驭途) pickup

- Foton Tunland Yutu 8
- Foton Tunland Yutu 9
- Foton General F9 (福田 将军 F9 pickup)
- Foton Grand General G7 (福田 大将军 G7 pickup)
- Foton Grand General G9 (福田 大将军 G9 pickup)

Foton Mars (火星) pickup/ Foton Tunland V pickup

- Foton Mars 7 (福田 火星7 pickup)
- Foton Mars 9 (福田 火星9 pickup)

Foton Saga (since 2004 under license of DangDong -terrain vehicle; Original name: 福田传奇) (Discontinued)

Foton SUP (since 2004 pickup based on the Saga; Original name: 萨普)

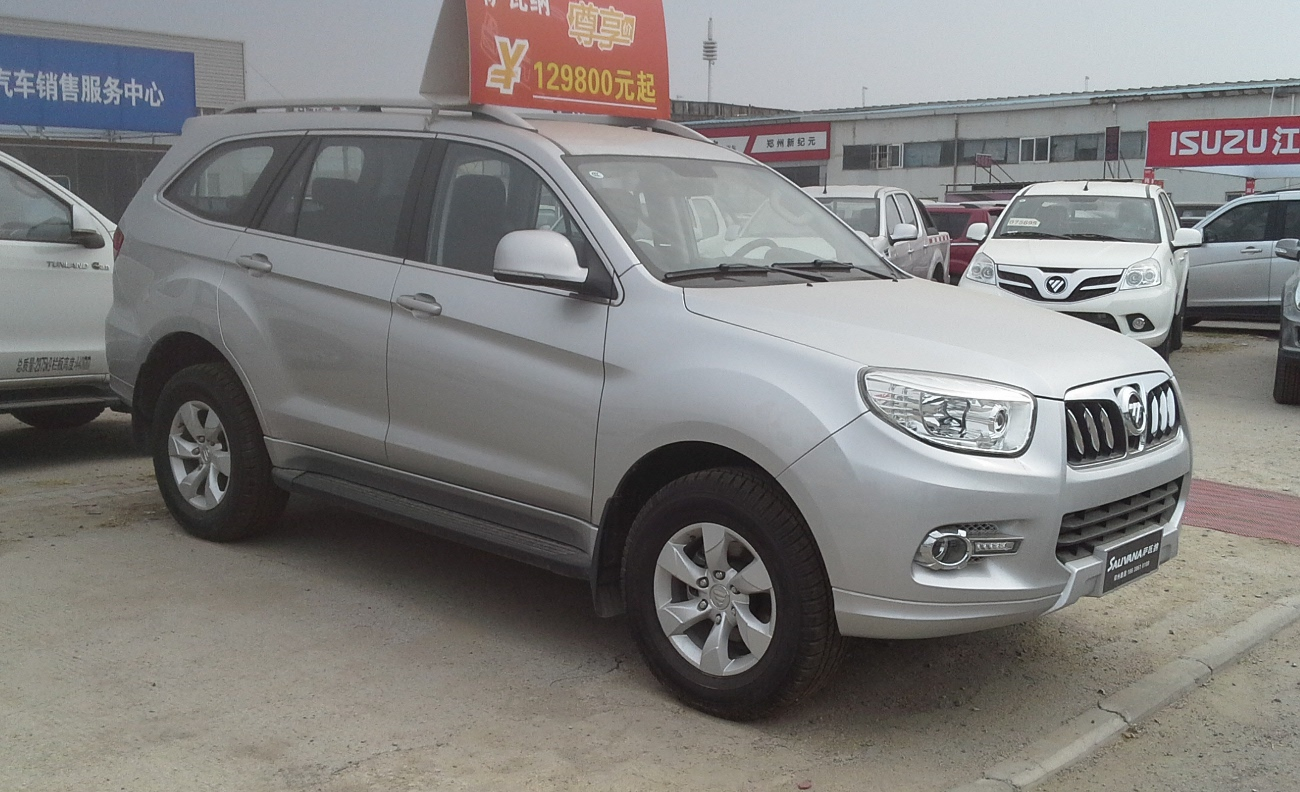
Foton Sauvana

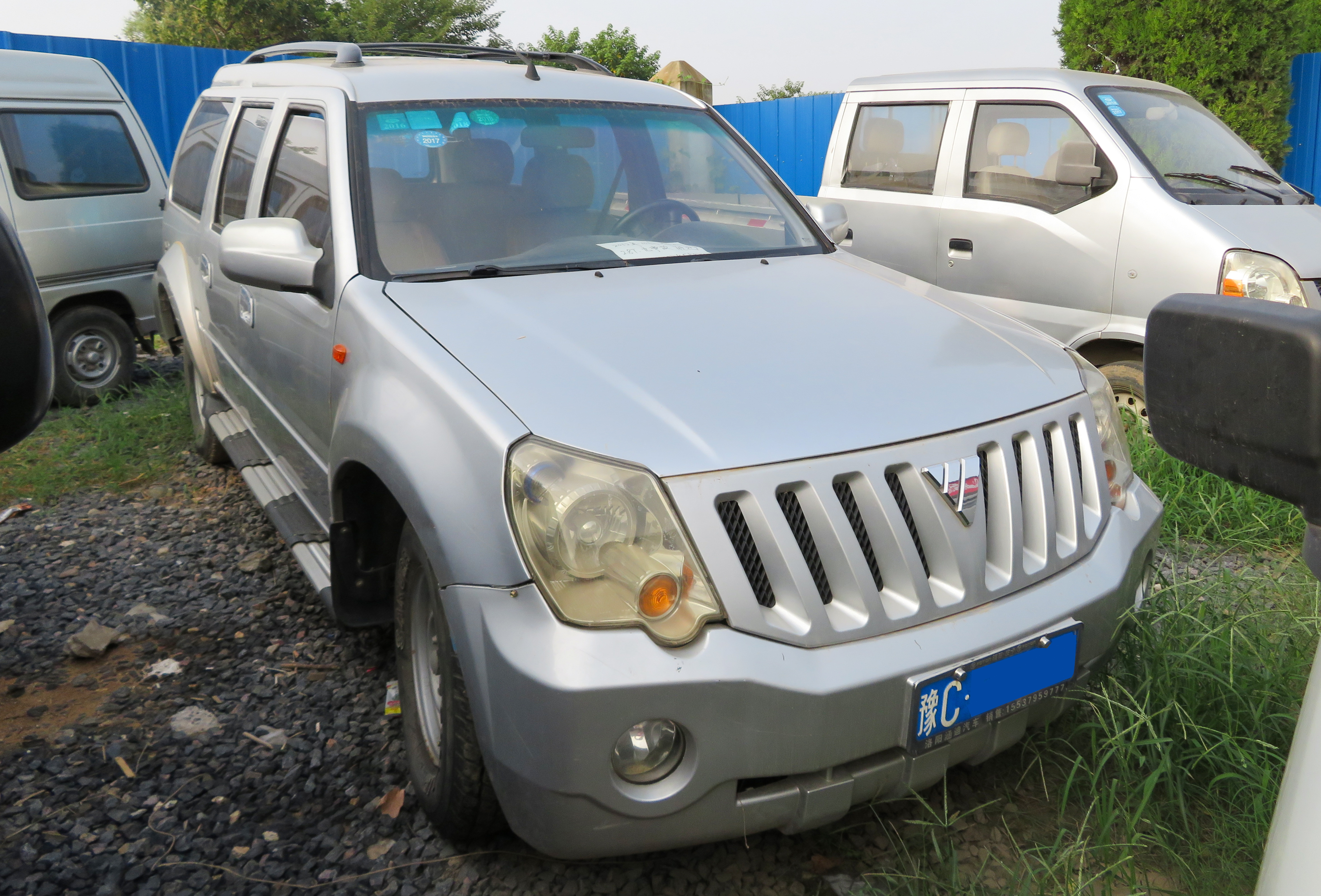
Foton Saga

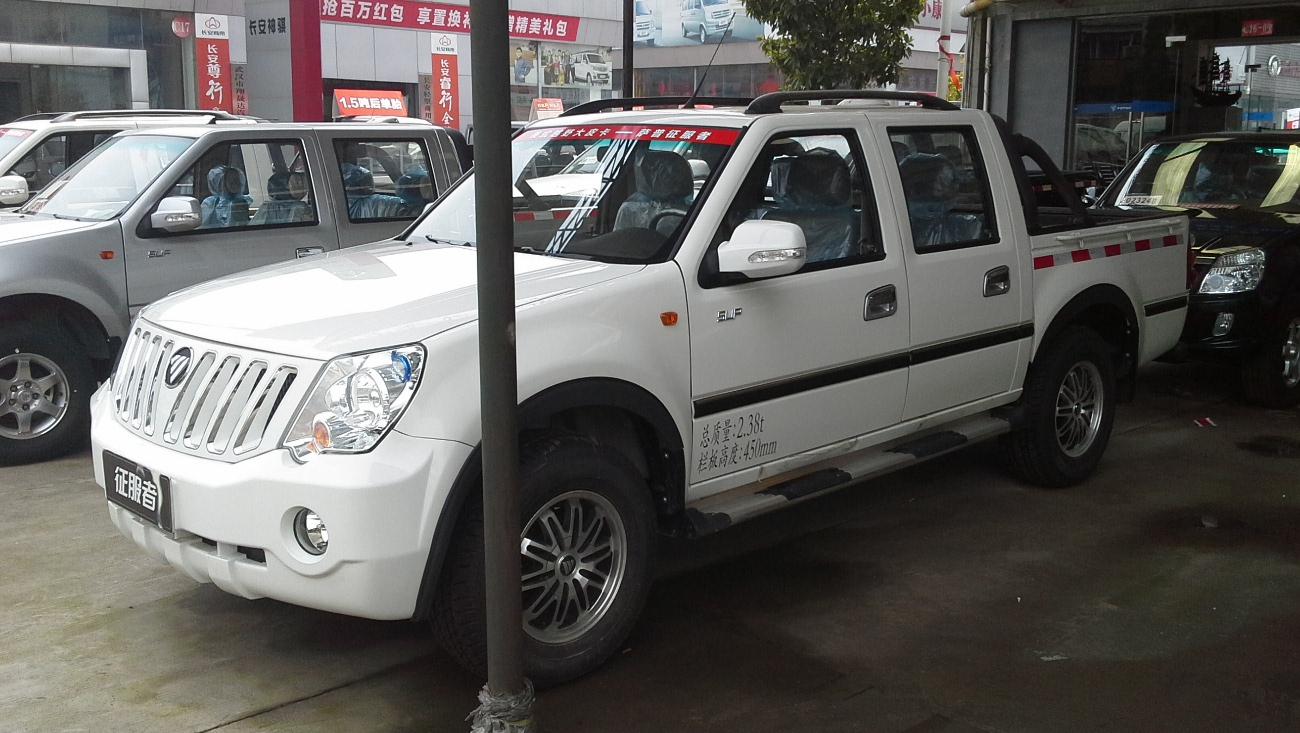
Foton SUP

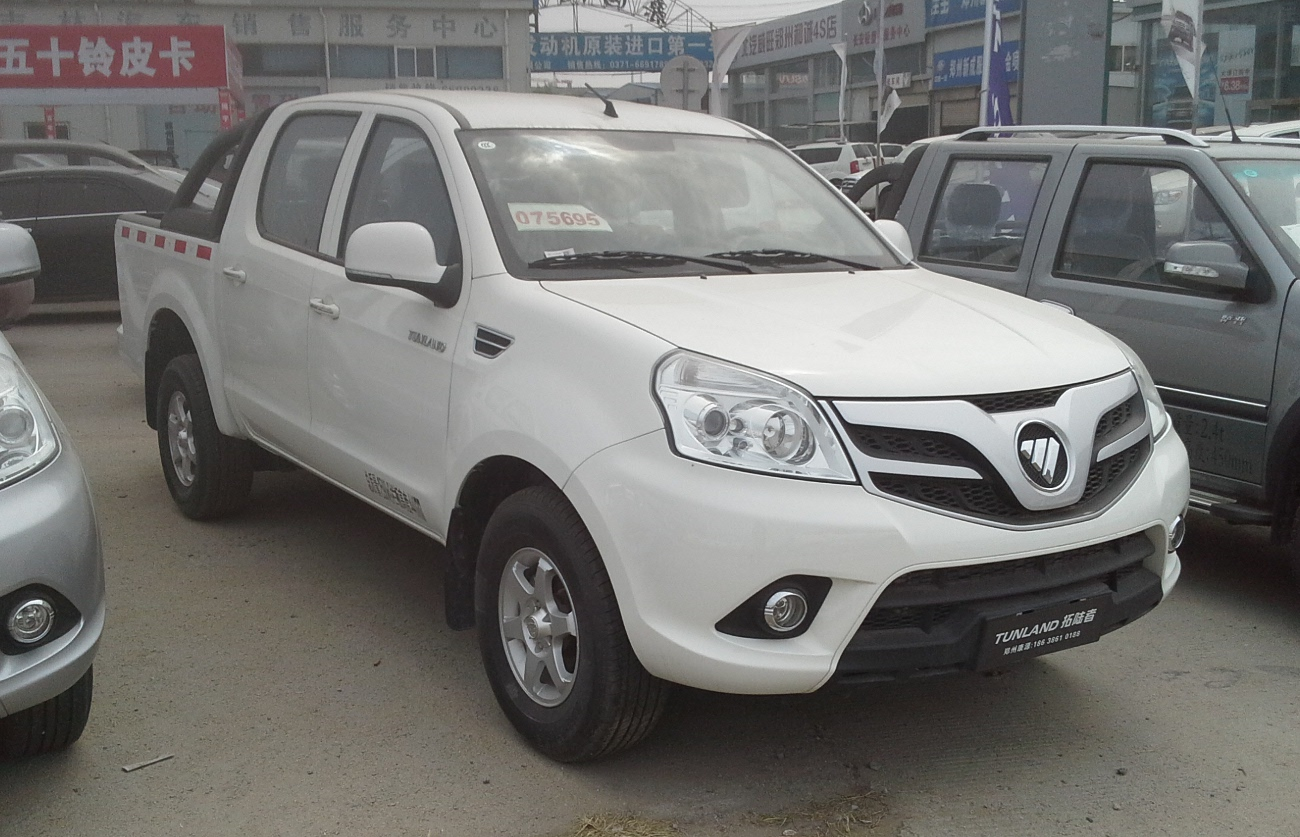
Foton Tunland

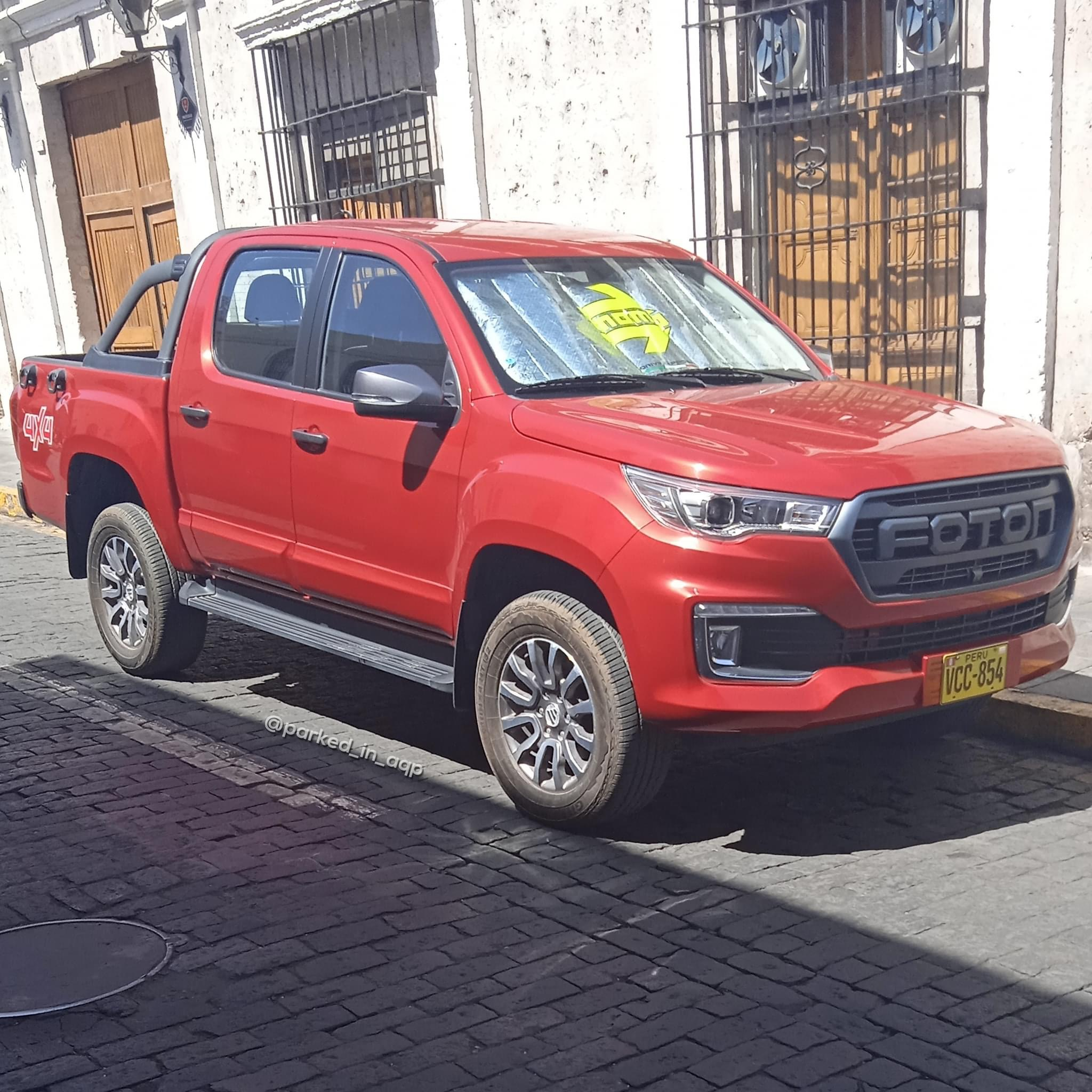
Foton Tunland Yutu

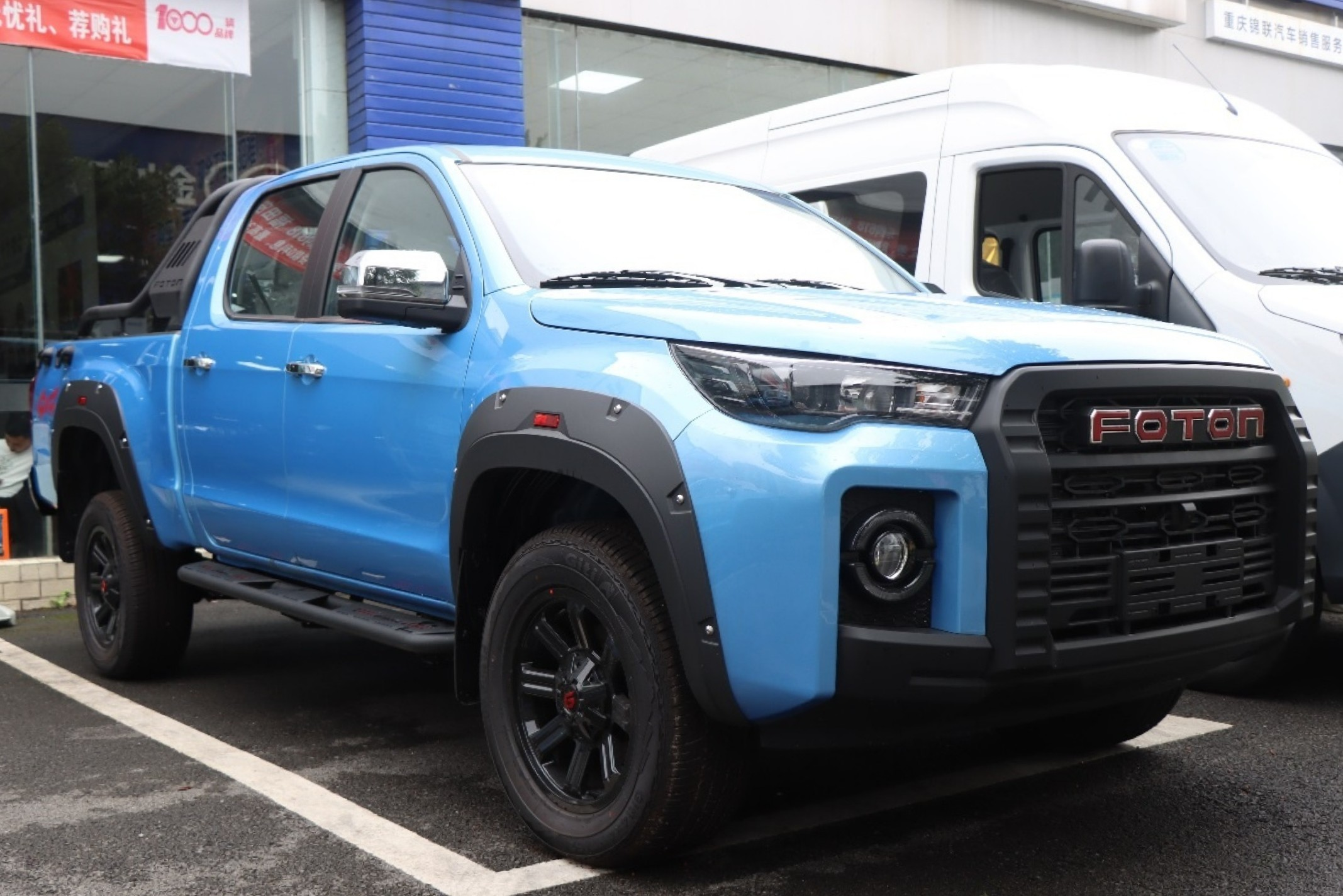
Foton Grand General G7

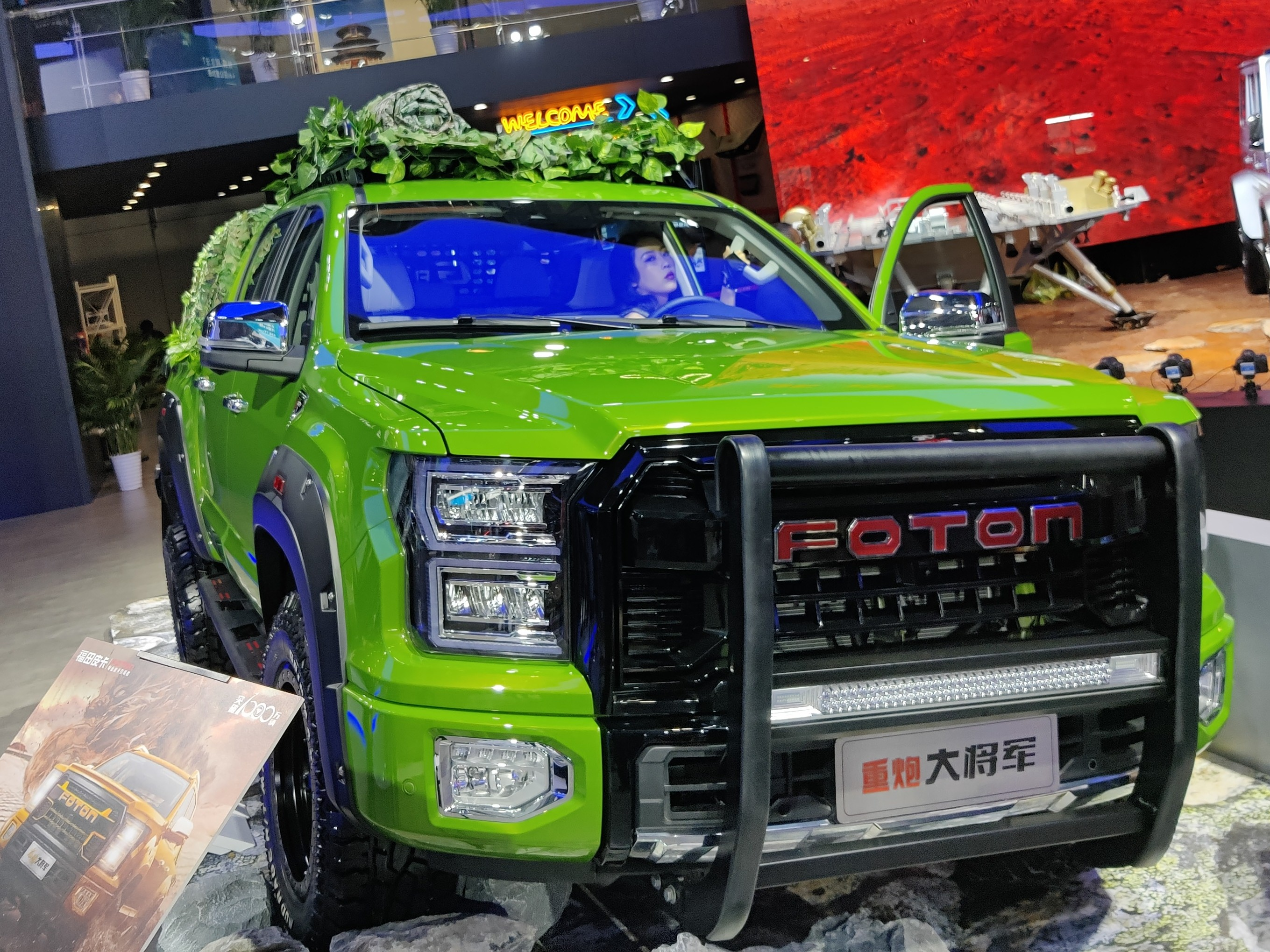
Foton Grand General G9

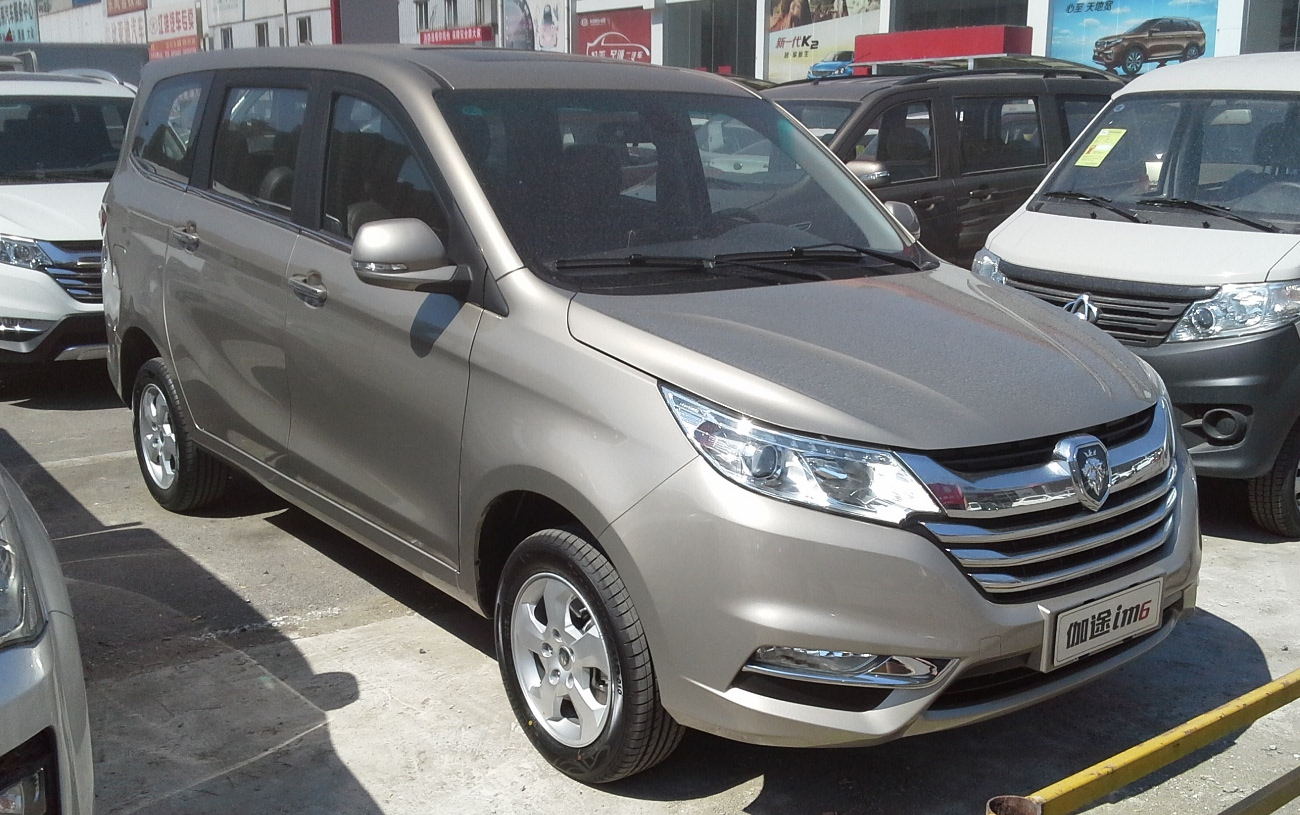
Foton Gratour im6

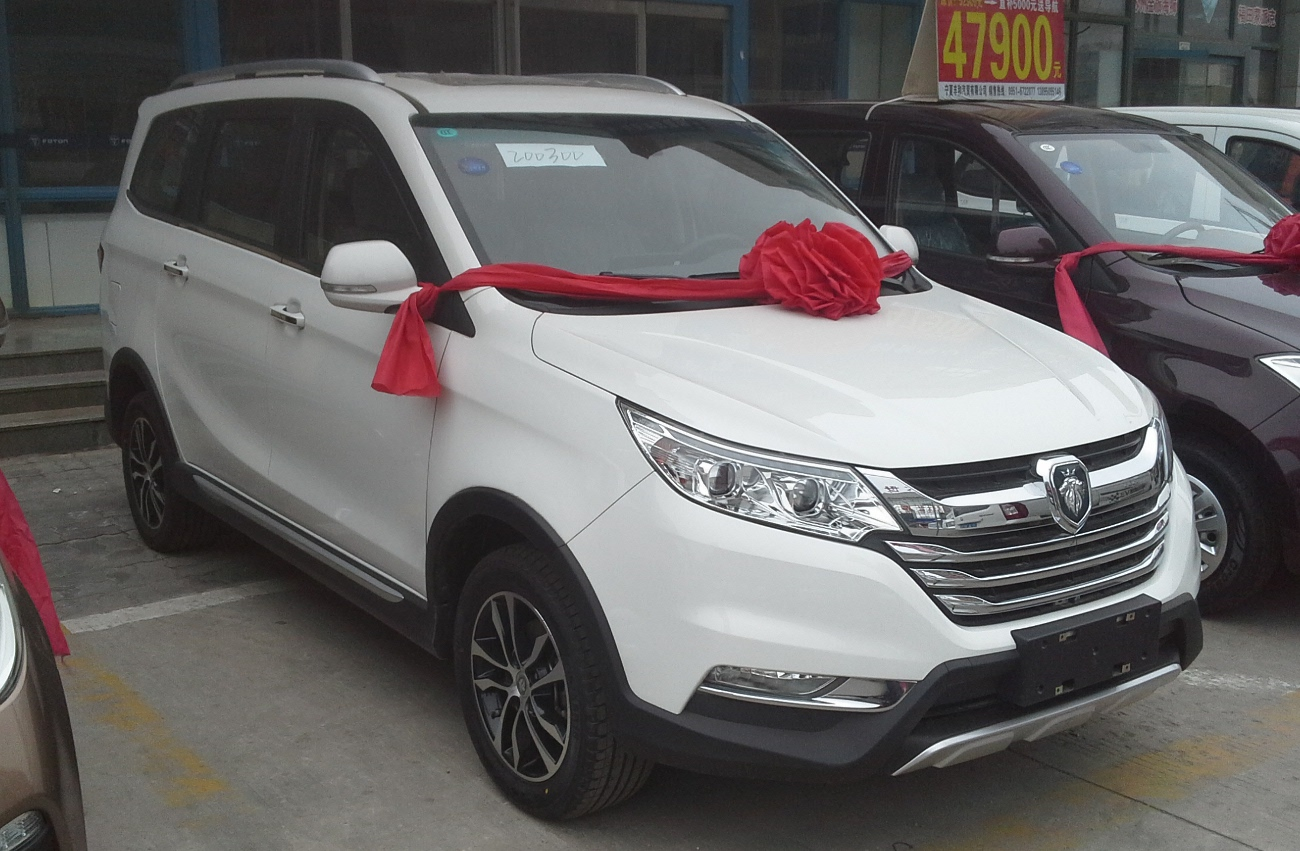
Foton Gratour im8

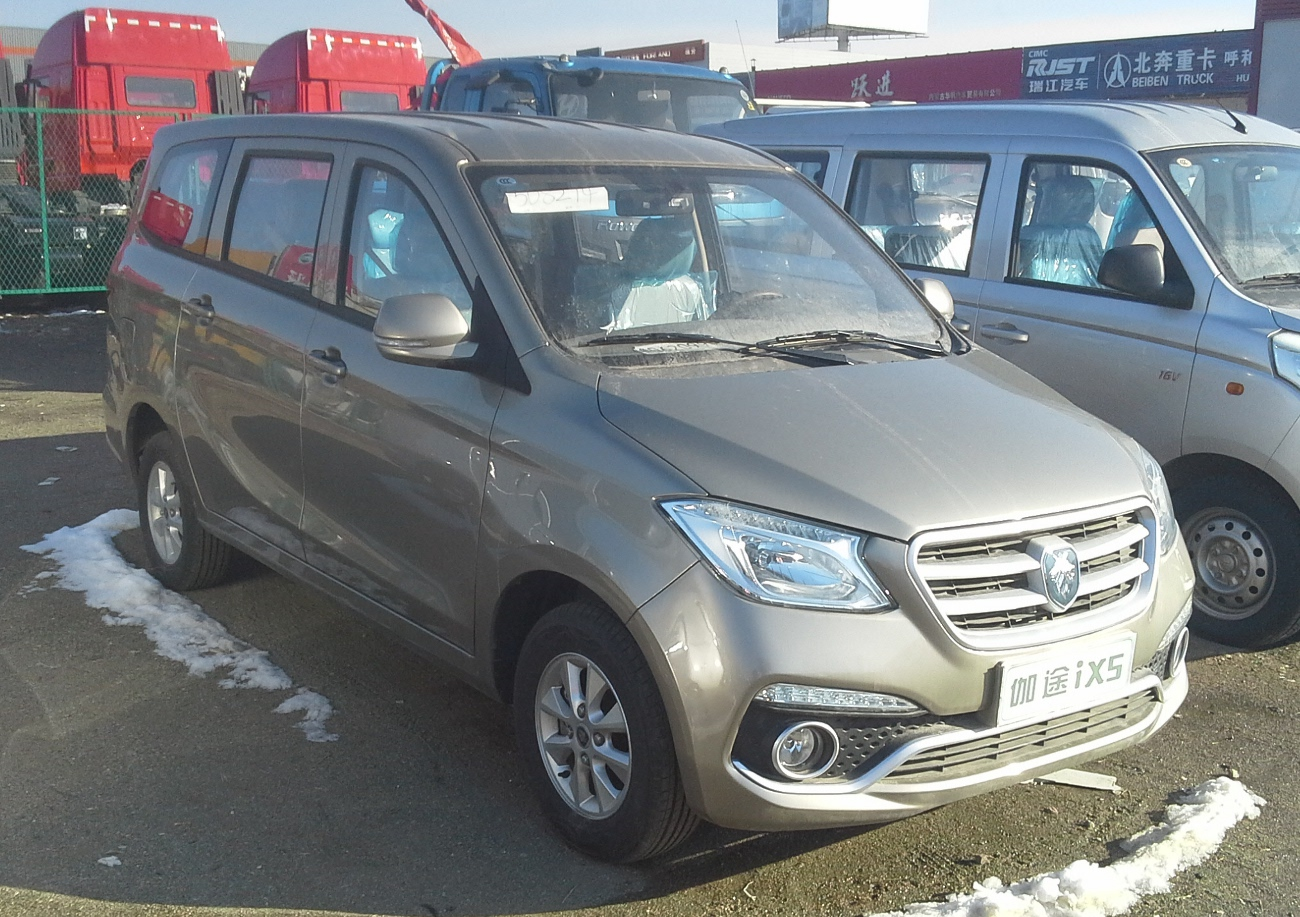
Foton Gratour ix5

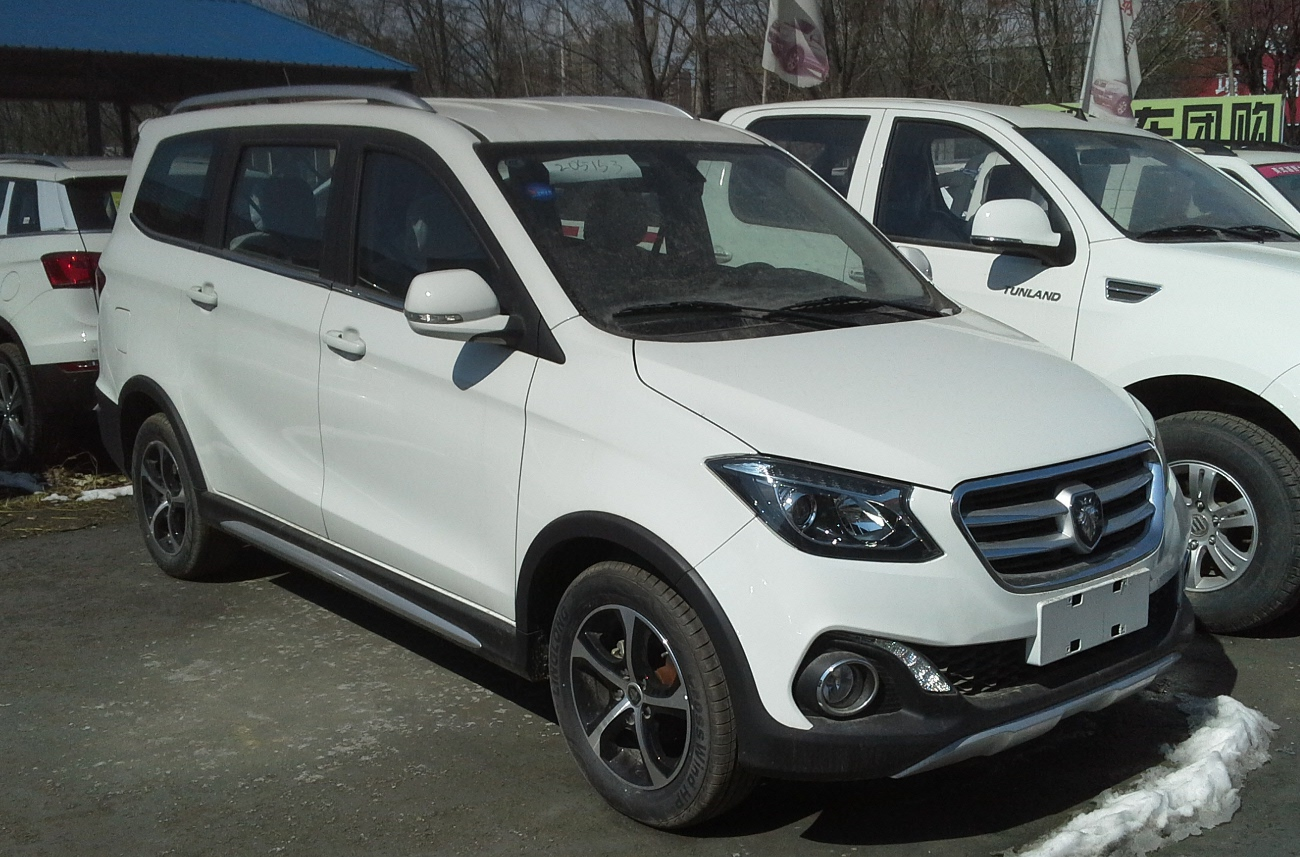
Foton Gratour ix7

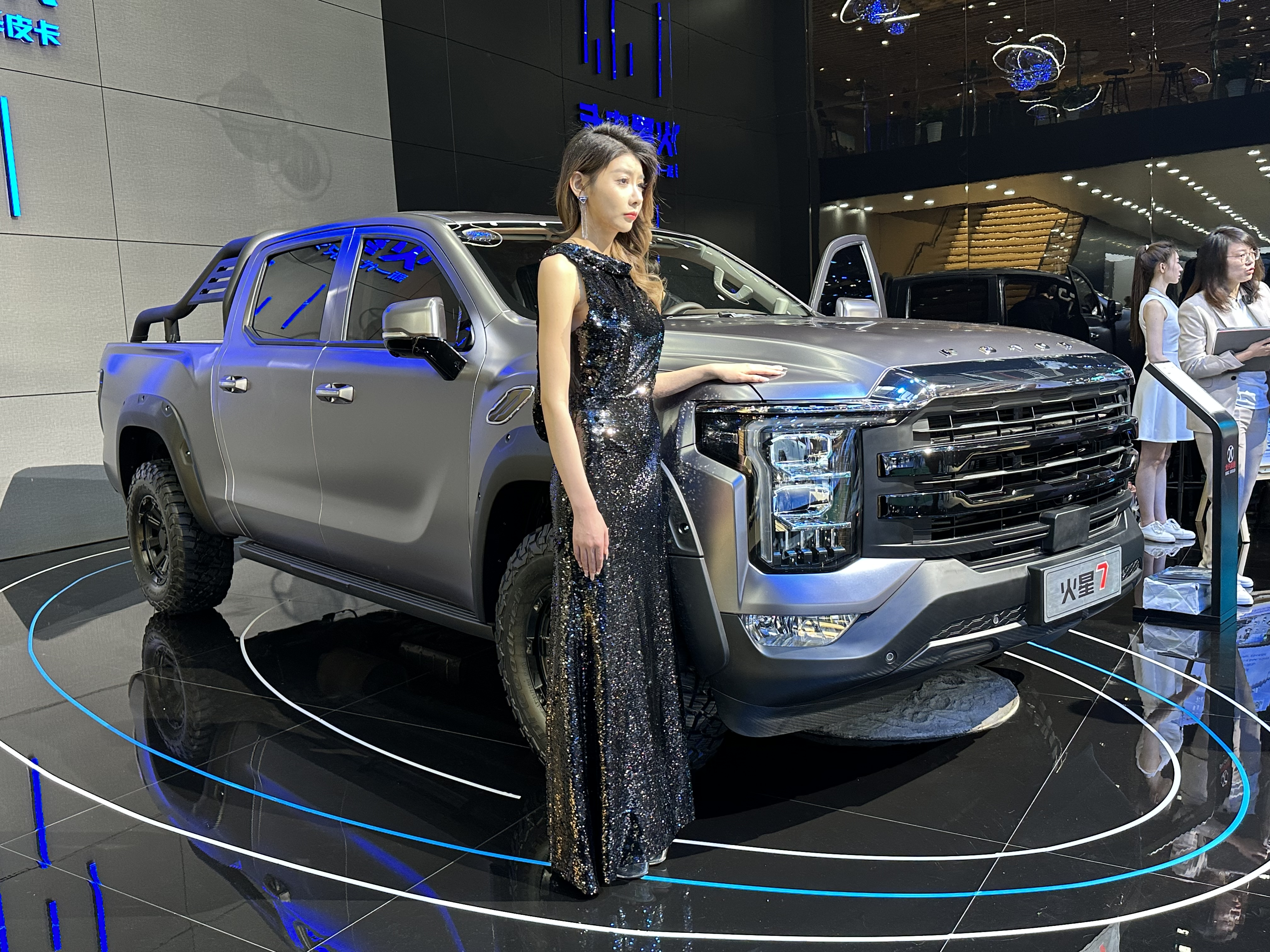
Foton Mars 7

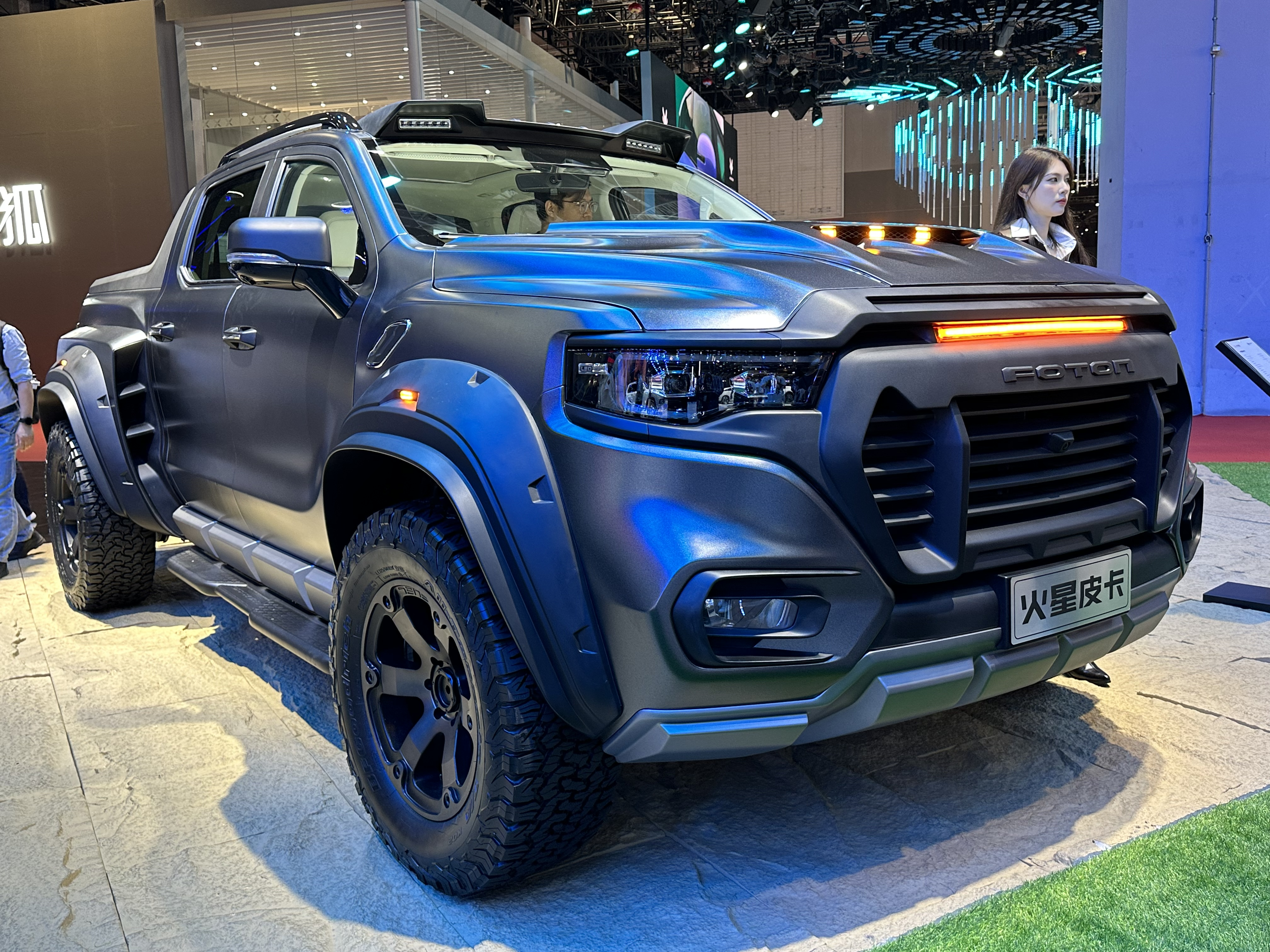
Foton Mars 9

=== Forland (时代汽车) ===
Forland is a sub-brand of Foton for micro-trucks, light trucks, and construction trucks since 2006. Three series are sold under the Forland branding, including the Linghang, Xiangling, and Ruiwo.

==== Foton Forland Linghang (Original name:时代领航) trucks ====
- Foton Forland Linghang G5
- Foton Forland Linghang G6
- Foton Forland Linghang S1
- Foton Forland Linghang M5
- Foton Forland Linghang M6

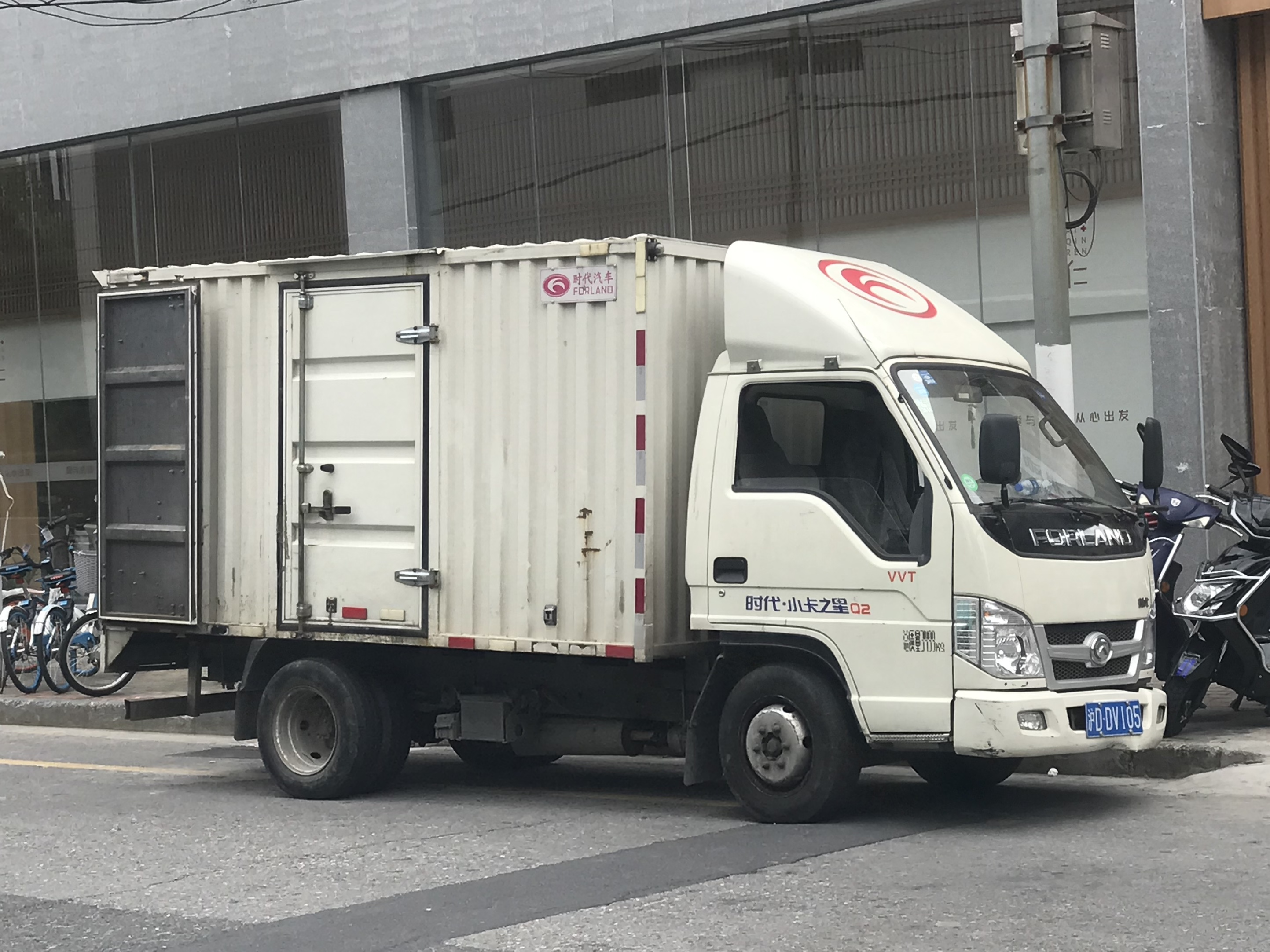
Foton Forland Q2 (discontinued)

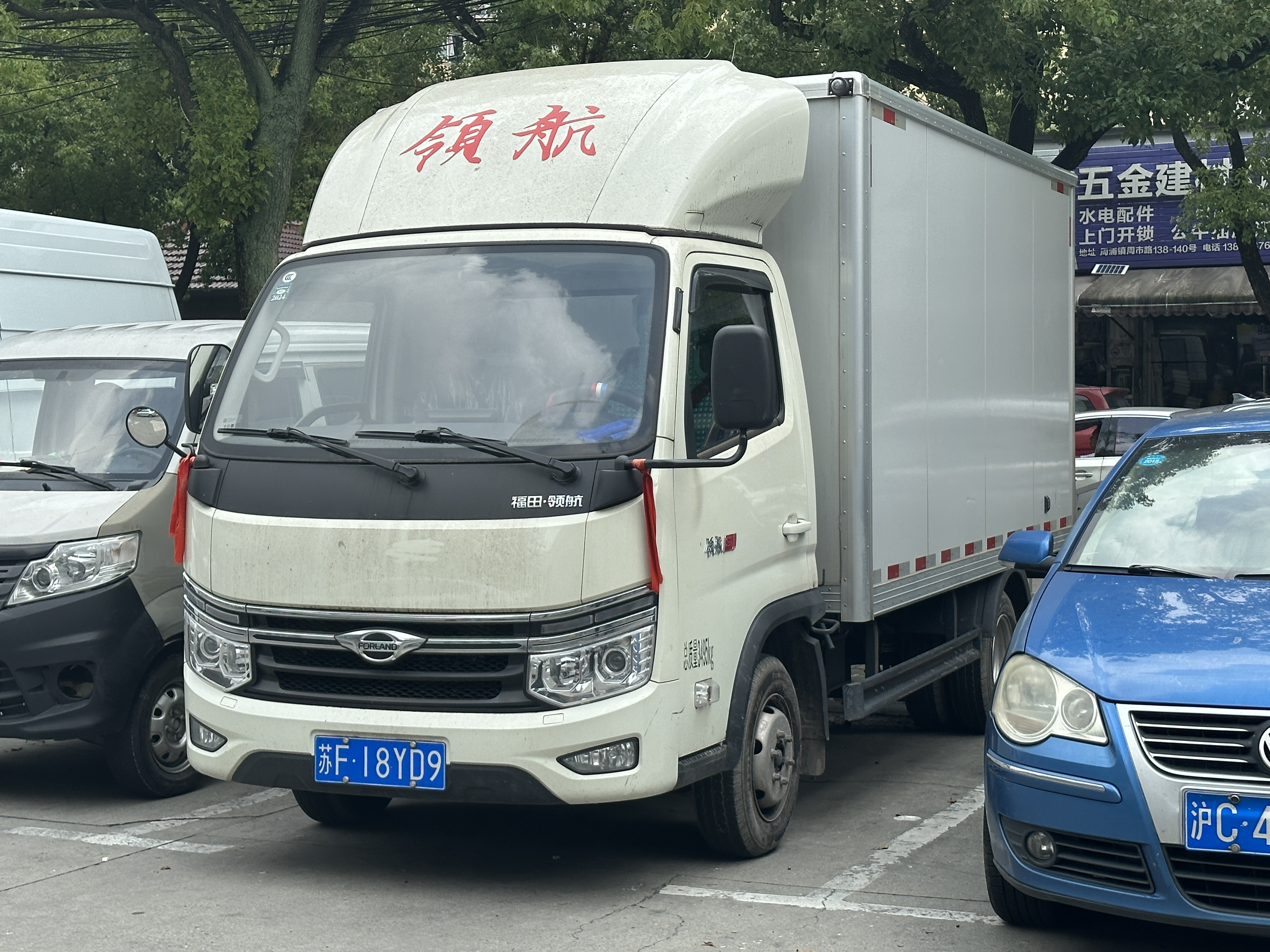
Foton Forland Linghang S1

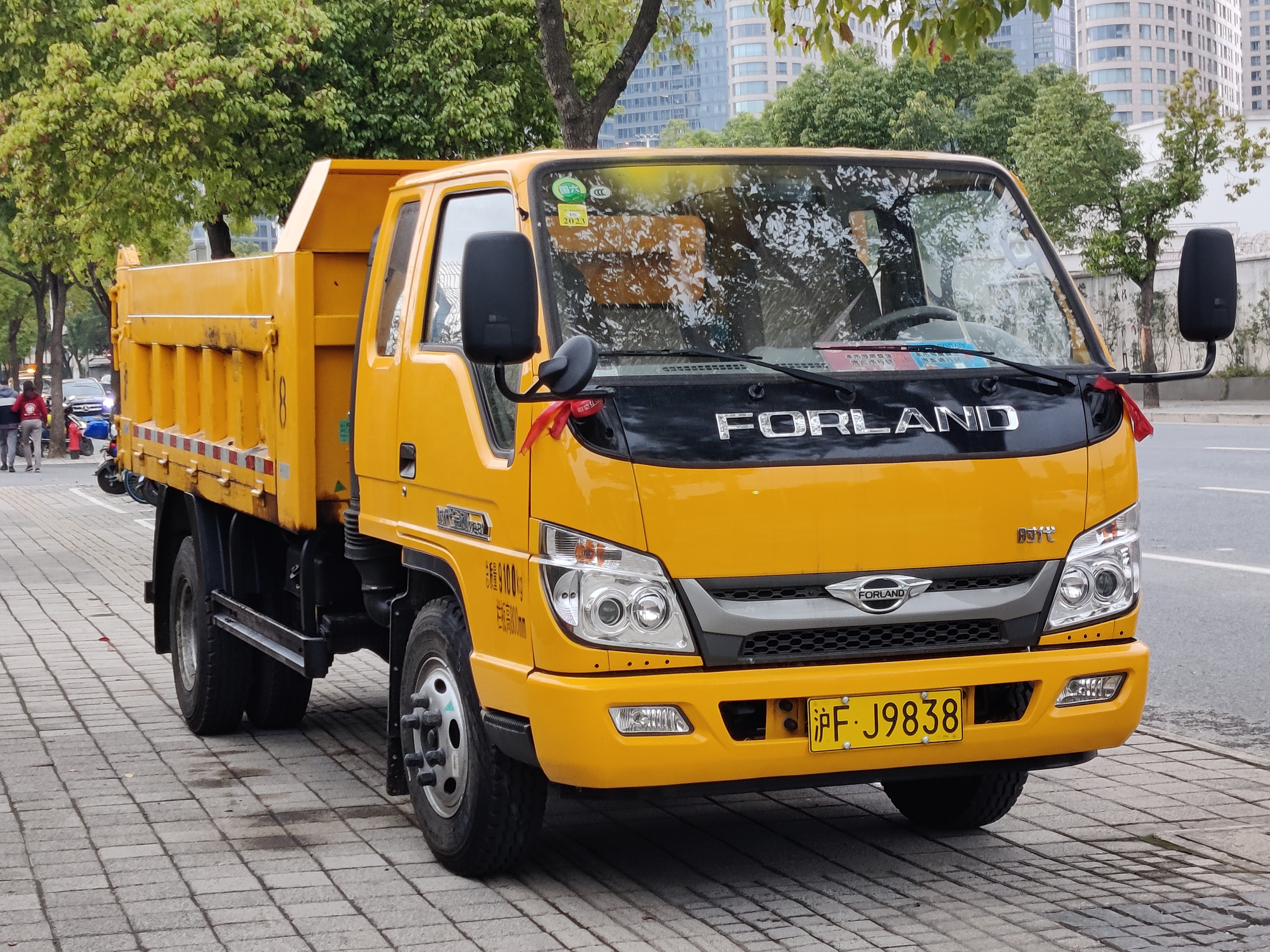
Foton Forland Jingang

==== Foton Forland Xiangling (Gratour) (Original name: 时代祥菱) micro commercial series ====
- Foton Xiangling M
- Foton Xiangling V
- Foton Xiangling V5
- Foton Xiangling Q

Foton Forland King Kong (since 1998 under license of a South American VW trucks; Original name: 时代金刚)

Gratour (北京伽途), later merged with Xiangling

- Gratour im6 (智爱MPV)
- Gratour im8 (智美运动家庭车)
- Gratour ix5 (1501cc; since 2016) (智行MPV)
- Gratour ix7 (1507cc; since 2016) (智趣S—MPV)
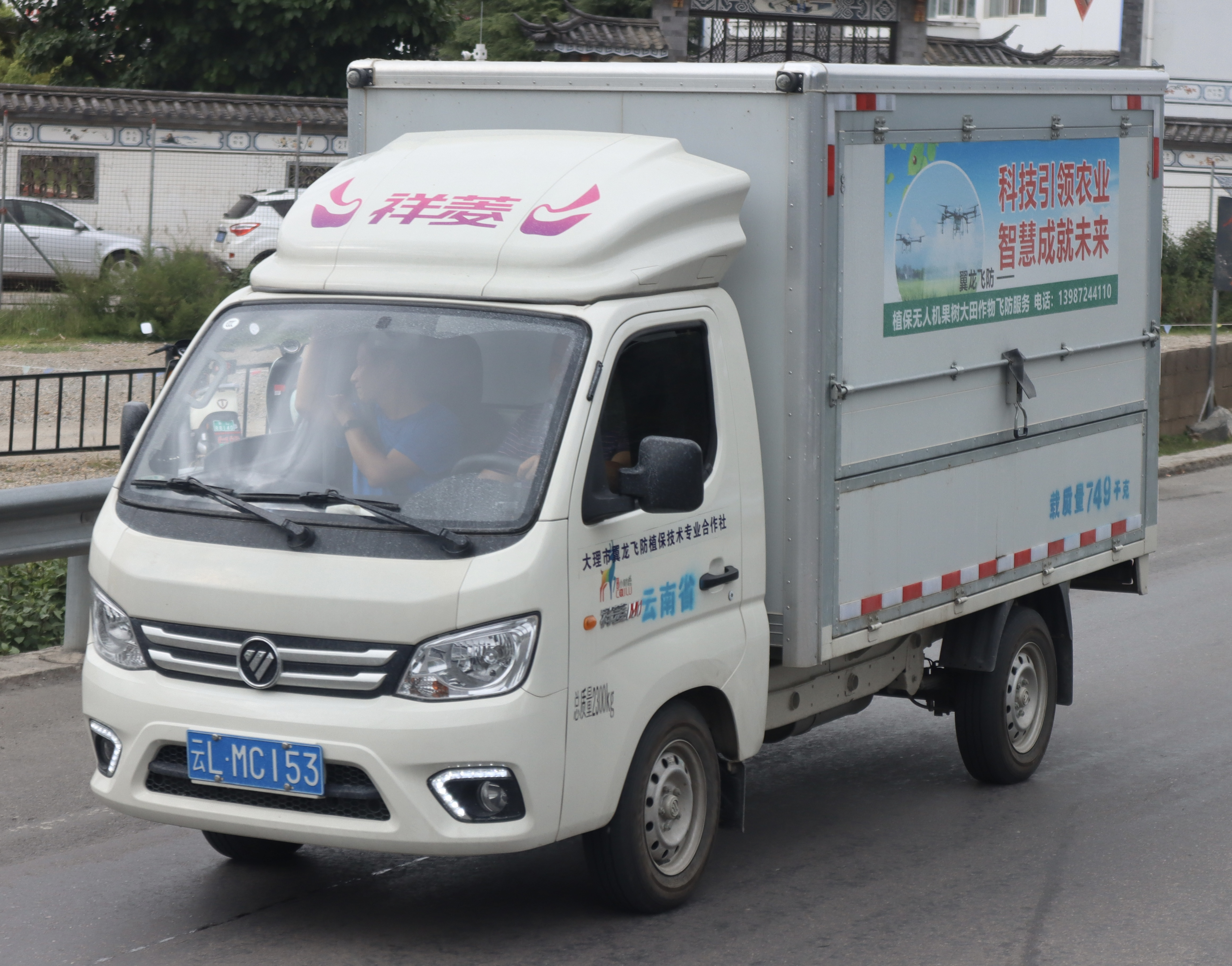
Foton Xiangling M

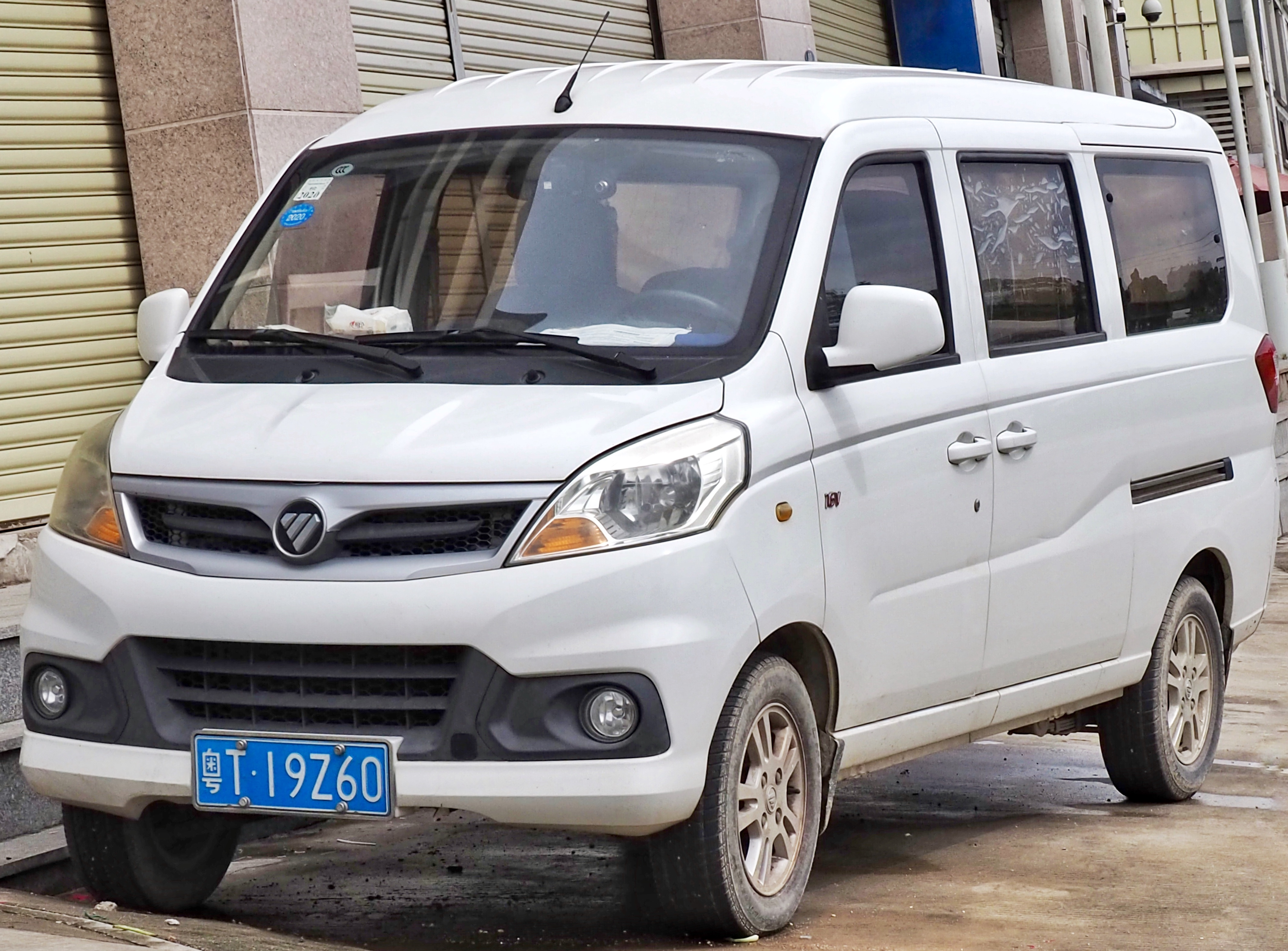
Foton Xiangling V

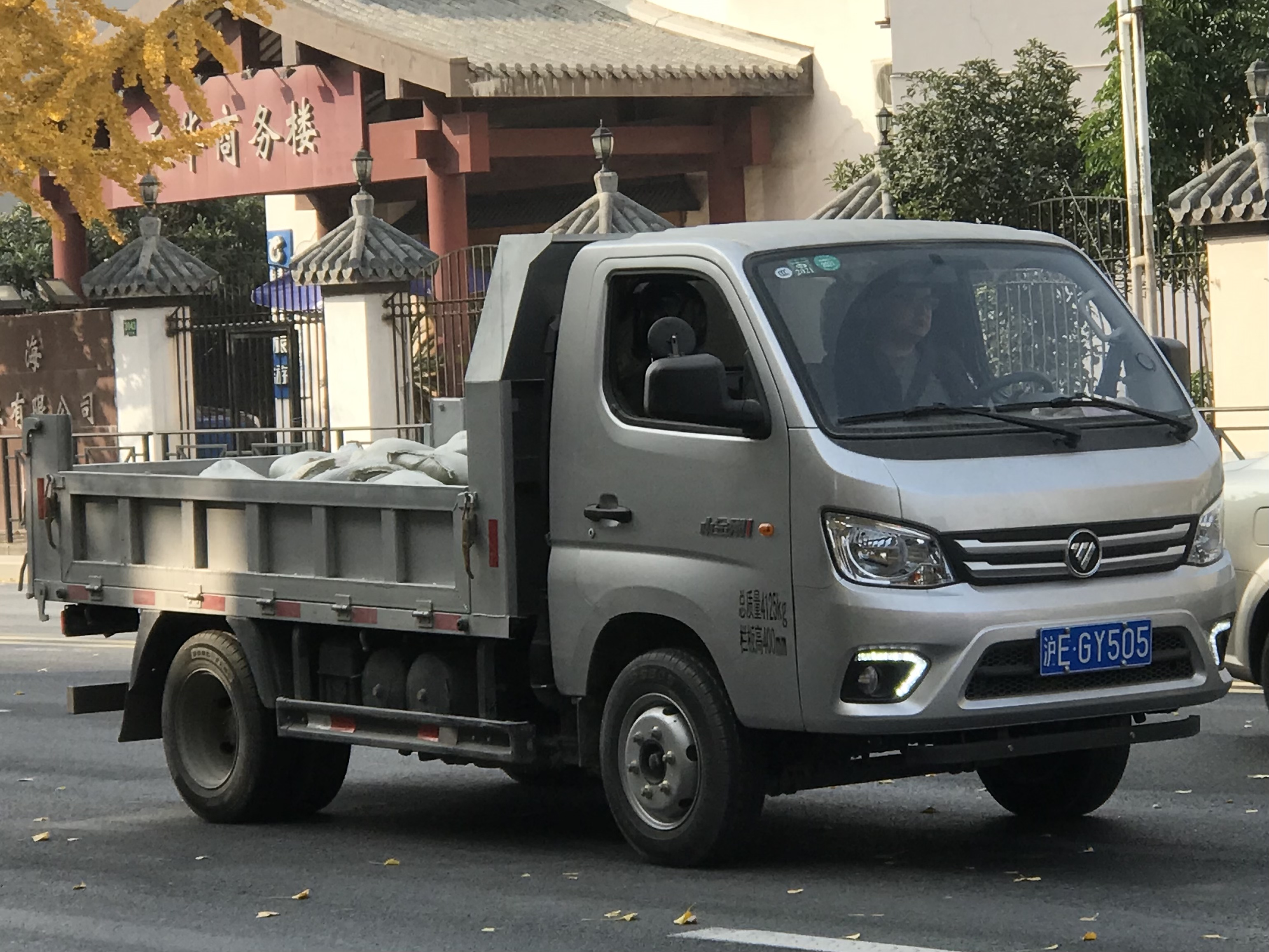
Foton Xiaojingang

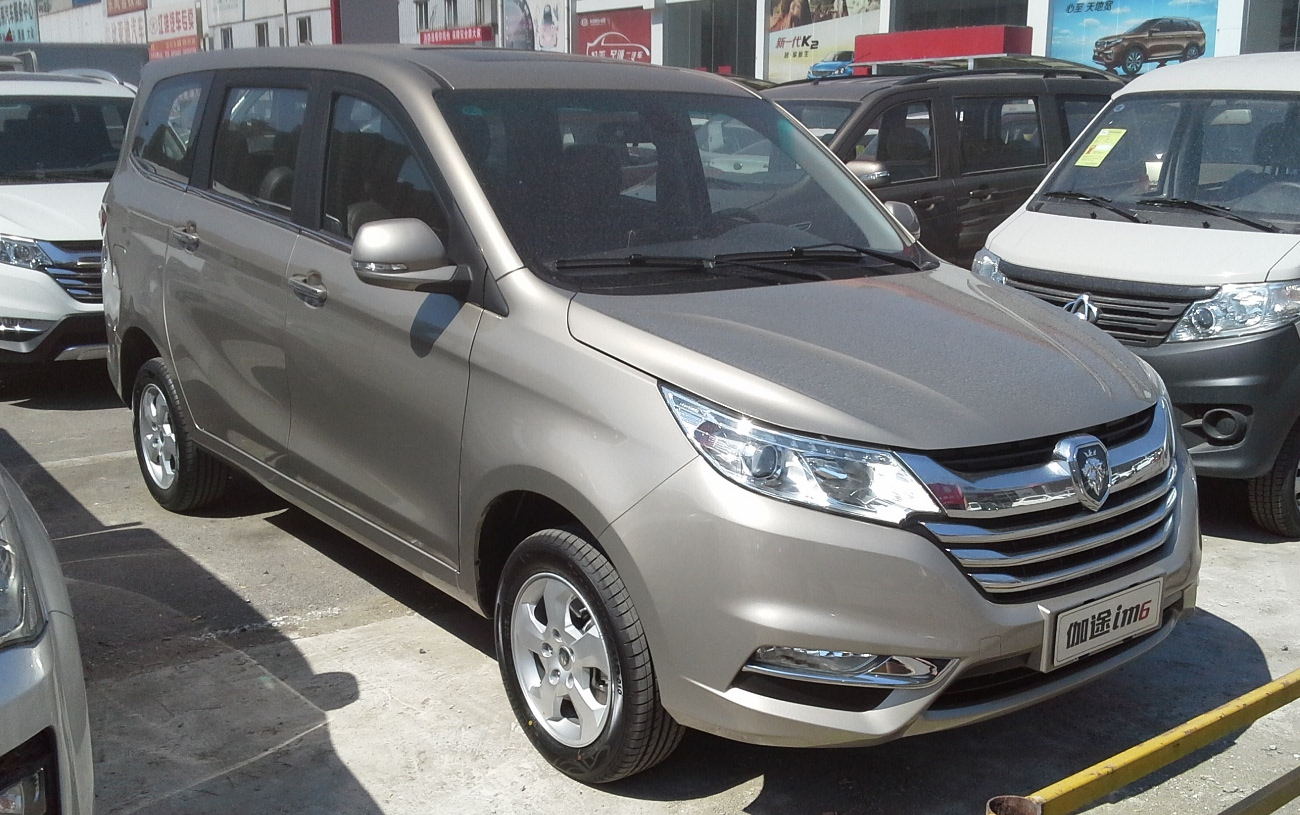
Foton Gratour im6

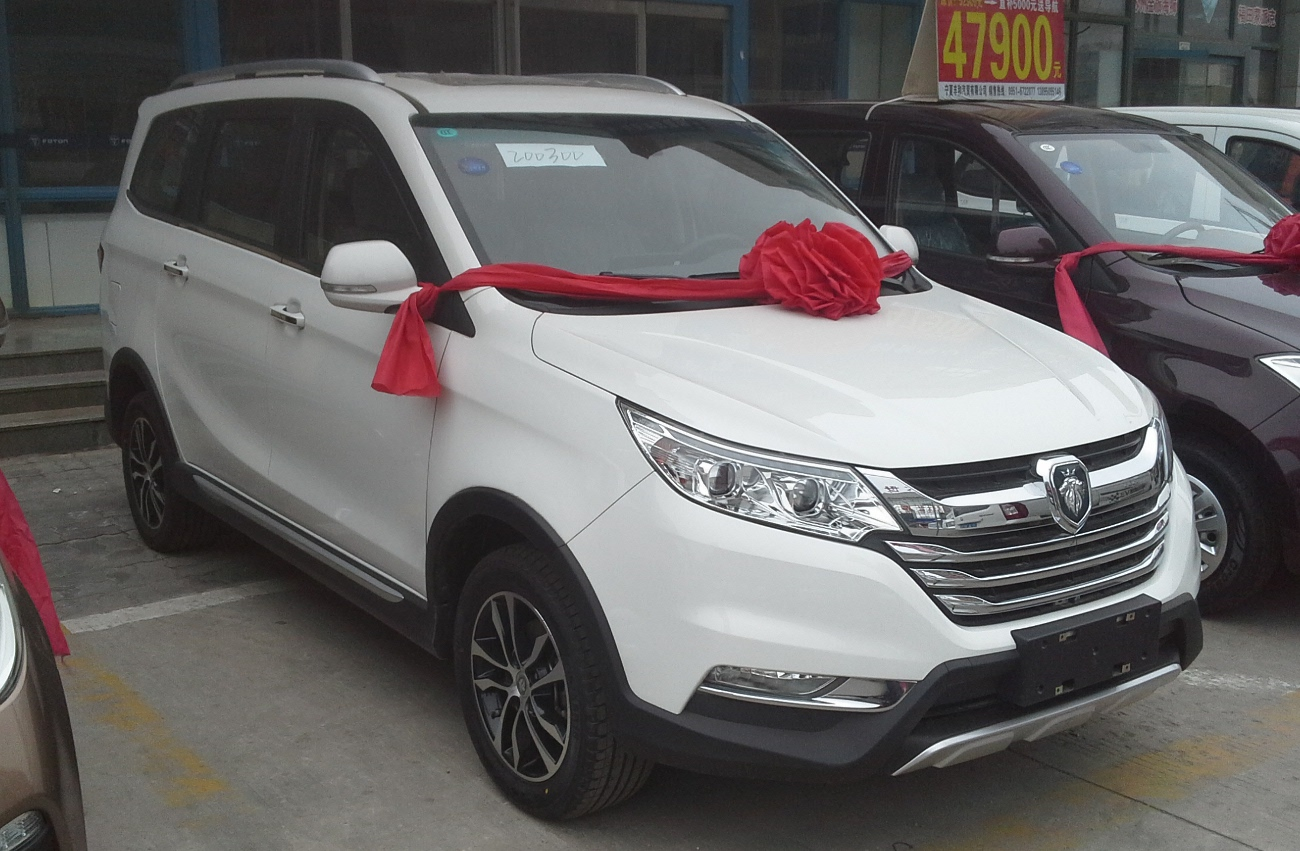
Foton Gratour im8

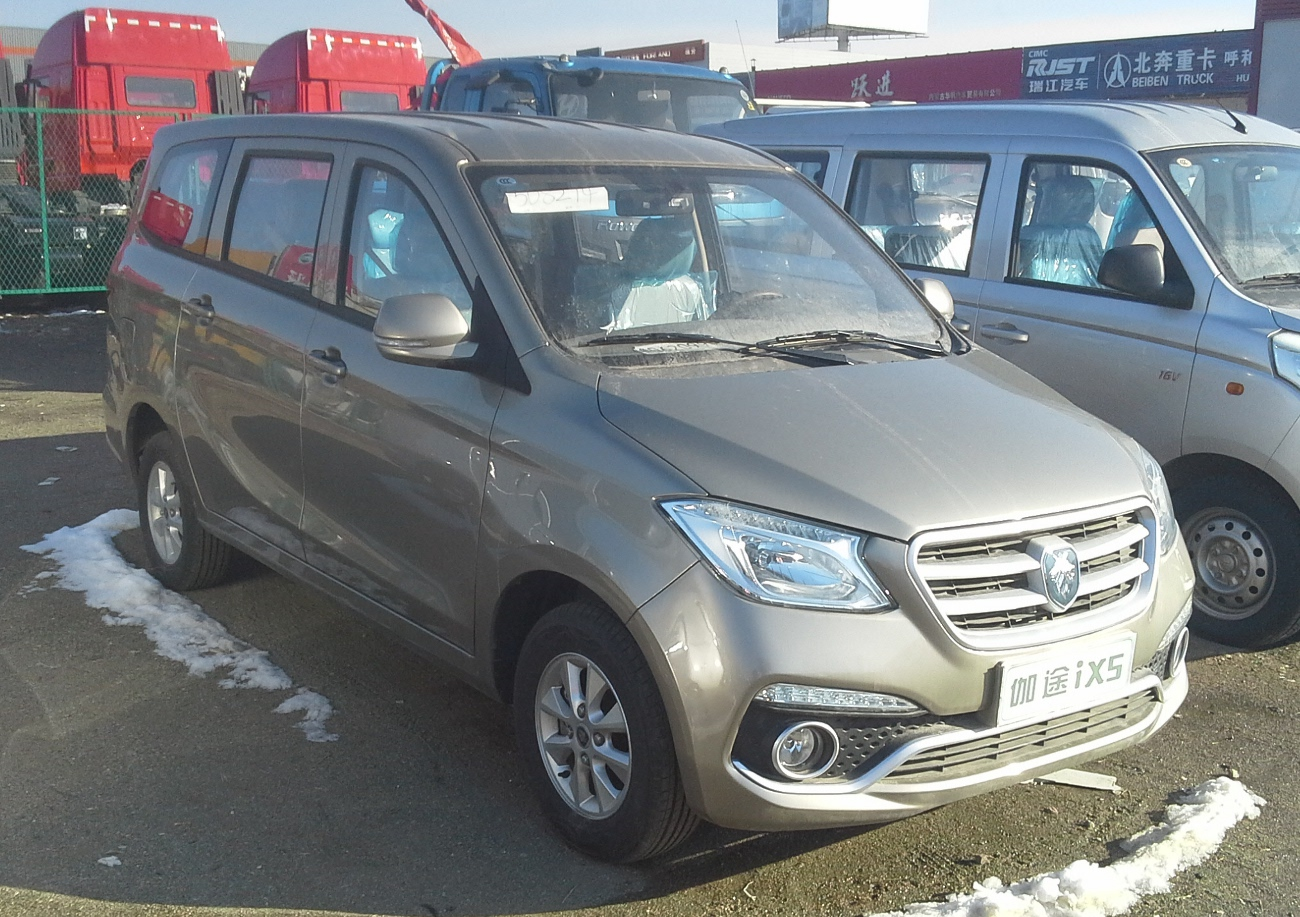
Foton Gratour ix5

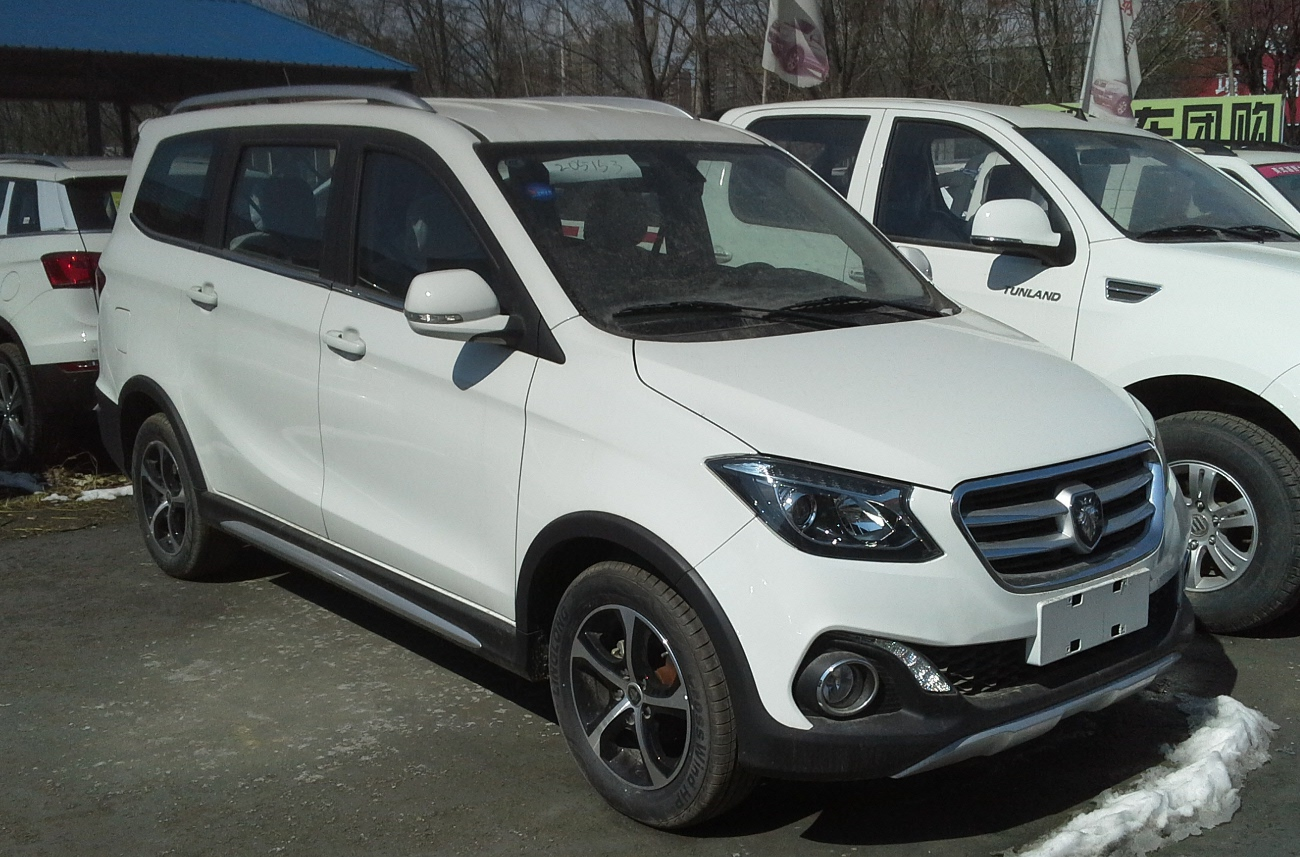
Foton Gratour ix7

==== Foton Forland Rowor (Original name:时代瑞沃) trucks ====
Producing mostly construction trucks, also with the name Foton Forland Ruiwo (since 1998 under license of a South American VW trucks; Original name: 瑞沃)

- Foton Rowor Xiaojingang
- Foton Rowor E3
- Foton Rowor Dajingang 1
- Foton Rowor Dajingang 3
- Foton Rowor ES3
- Foton Rowor ES5

== Sales ==
Foton Motor sold a total of 640,400 vehicles in 2011.

== See also ==
- Automobile manufacturers and brands of China
- List of automobile manufacturers of China
