= Fade =

Fade or Fading may refer to:

== Science and technology ==
- Fading, a loss of signal strength at a radio receiver
- Color fade, the alteration of color by light
- Fade (audio engineering), a gradual change in sound volume
- Fade (lighting), a gradual change in intensity of a light source
- Brake fade, in vehicle braking systems, a reduction in stopping power after repeated use

== Arts and entertainment ==
=== Film and television ===
- Fade (filmmaking), a cinematographic technique
- Fade (2008 film), a film starring Sarah Lassez, Michael T. Weiss, and Devon Odessa
- The Fades (TV series), a 2011 UK supernatural drama series
- "Fade", a television episode of Smallville season 5

=== Literature ===
- Fade (novel), a 1988 novel by Robert Cormier
- The Fade, a 2007 novel by Chris Wooding
- Fade, a humanoid race of monsters from Robert Jordan's 1990-2013 fantasy novel series The Wheel of Time.

==== Performers ====
- Fade (band), a Japanese alternative rock band
- The Fades (band), a British indie rock band

==== Albums ====
- Fade (Remove Silence album) or the title song, 2010
- Fade (Yo La Tengo album), 2013
- Fade (Boris album), 2022

==== Songs ====
- "Fade" (instrumental), 2014 instrumental by Alan Walker
- "Fade" (Jakwob song), 2013
- "Fade" (Kanye West song), 2016
- "Fade" (Kristine W song), 2009
- "Fade" (Lewis Capaldi song), 2017
- "Fade" (Staind song), 2001
- "Fading" (song), 2010 song by Rihanna
- "Fade", by Basement from I Wish I Could Stay Here, 2011
- "Fade", by Blue Angel from Blue Angel, 1980
- "Fade", by Cane Hill from A Piece of Me I Never Let You Find, 2024
- "Fade", by God Is an Astronaut from Ghost Tapes #10, 2021
- "Fade", by Gothminister from Anima Inferna, 2011
- "Fade", by Karnivool from Persona, 2001
- "Fade", by Northlane from Mesmer, 2017
- "Fade", by the Prom Kings, 2005
- "Fade", by Solu Music, 2001

=== Other entertainment ===
- Fade (video game), a 2001 point-and-click adventure game for the Pocket PC/Windows Mobile platform
- Fade Out – Fade In, a stage musical with a book and lyrics by Betty Comden and Adolph Green and music by Jule Styne

== People ==
- Kris Fade (born 1980), Australian-Lebanese radio presenter, host, and musician
- Fade Goff (1780–1836), land agent and political figure in Prince Edward Island

== Other uses ==
- Hi-top fade, a hairstyle
- Fade, a characteristic of a shot in golf stroke mechanics

== See also ==
- Fade away (disambiguation)
- Fade in (disambiguation)
- Fade out (disambiguation)
- Fade to Black (disambiguation)
- Fade to Grey (disambiguation)
- Faded (disambiguation)
- Fader (disambiguation)
- Gradient (disambiguation)
