= Feder =

Feder is the German word for "feather", "quill", and secondarily for "[mechanical] spring", and may refer to:

== Surname ==
- Abraham Hyman Feder (1908–1997), American lighting designer
- Adolphe Féder (1886–1943), Jewish-Ukrainian painter and illustrator
- Dege Feder (born 1978), a multi-disciplinary Ethiopian-born artist based in Israel
- Donald A. Feder (born 1946), American media consultant, free-lance writer and World Congress of Families Communications Director
- Ed Feder (1896–1968), Australian rules footballer
- Essener Feder (or Feather), award for German-style board games
- Eva Feder Kittay, American philosopher and academic
- Galila Ron-Feder Amit (born 1949), Israeli children books author
- Gottfried Feder (1883–1941), German economist and key member of the Thule Society and of the Nazi Party
- Janet Feder, American composer and guitarist
- Gottfried Jens Feder (1939–2019), Norwegian physicist
- Johann Georg Heinrich Feder (1740–1821), German philosopher
- Johann Michael Feder (1753–1824), German Roman Catholic theologian
- Judy Feder, professor of Public Policy
- Kenneth Feder, professor of archaeology
- Naftali Feder (1920–2009), Israeli politician, member of the Knesset for the Alignment (1977–84)
- Paula Marie Mathilde Illemann Feder (1893–1967), Danish actor and educator
- Robert Feder (born 1956), media blogger
- Robert Arthur Feder (1909–1986), American screenwriter and film producer
- Tobias Gutmann Feder (c. 1760–1817), Maskilic writer, poet, and grammarian
- Galila Ron-Feder Amit (born 1949), Israeli author

== Others ==
- Feder (DJ), French DJ and music producer
- Feder (fencing), an early modern practice or sparring weapon derived from the longsword
- Feder Grotesk, a "stressed" sans-serif type introduced by Jakob Erbar in 1910
- Olami–Feder–Christensen model, an earthquake model conjectured to be an example of self-organized criticality

== See also ==
- Olami–Feder–Christensen model, an earthquake model
- Fader (disambiguation)
