= Fader =

Fader may refer to:

- Fader (audio engineering), a device for gradually increasing or decreasing the level of an audio signal

== Music ==
- "Fader" (song), by the Temper Trap, 2009
- Fader Label, an American independent record label
- The Faders, a British female pop rock band 2004–06
- "Fader", a song by Paradise Lost from their 2001 album Believe in Nothing

== Other uses ==
- Fader (surname)
- The Fader, an American music, culture, and fashion publication

== See also ==
- Fade (disambiguation)
- Fade in (disambiguation)
- Fade out (disambiguation)
- Faded (disambiguation)
- Feder (disambiguation)
