= Fade out =

Fade out, Fade-out or Fadeout may refer to:

== Technical engineering ==
- Fade-out or fade, a gradual decrease in sound volume
- Fade (lighting) or fade-out, a gradual decrease in intensity of a stage lighting source
- Dissolve (filmmaking) or fade-out, a cinematographic technique causing the picture to darken and disappear

== Fiction ==
- Fadeout (novel), a 1970 novel by Joseph Hansen
- The Fade Out, a 2014 comic book by Ed Brubaker and Sean Phillips
- Fadeout, a 1959 novel by Douglas Woolf
- Fade-Out, a 1975 science fiction novel by Patrick Tilley

== Music ==
- Fade Out (album), a 1988 album by Loop
- "Fade Out", a song by James Bay from Electric Light
- "Fade Out", a song by Seether from Holding Onto Strings Better Left to Fray
- "Fade Out", a song by Seeb and Olivia O'Brien
- "Fadeout", a song by +/- from Let's Build a Fire

== Television ==
- "Fadeout" (Arrow), the series finale of Arrow
- "Fade Out" (CSI: Miami), an episode of CSI: Miami
- "Fade Out" (Hercules), an episode of Hercules: The Legendary Journeys

== Other ==
- Fade Out: The Calamitous Final Days of MGM, a 1990 book by Peter Bart
- "Fade out", the exercise term for the fifth and lowest DEFCON level of readiness

== See also ==
- Fade (disambiguation)
- Fade in (disambiguation)
- "Fade Out/In", a song by Paloalto
- "Fade Out, Fade In", an episode of M*A*S*H
- Fade Out – Fade In, a 1964 Broadway musical
- "Street Spirit (Fade Out)", a song by Radiohead
