= A Gilded Eternity =

Studio album by Loop
- Released: January 1990
- Recorded: September–October 1989
- Genre: Space rock; shoegaze
- Length: 41:41
- Label: Situation Two
- Producer: Loop

Loop chronology
Fade Out (1988)	A Gilded Eternity (1990)	Sonancy (2022)

A Gilded Eternity is the third studio album by the rock band Loop. Released in 1990 on Situation Two, it was a commercial success, topping the UK Indie Charts (as their previous album Fade Out had done) and reaching #39 on the official UK album charts.

== Music ==
By A Gilded Eternity, Loop "had mostly excised the 1960s Technicolor psychedelia that had defined their debut, Heaven's End, leaving only a molten orange lava of layered space rock that was entirely all their own", according to Brainwashed's Creaig Dunton. NME journalist Chris Parkin called A Gilded Eternity "primal and loud, with sharp, nasty edges that nod towards the precise machine-rock of Can and Sonic Youth's maniacal guitar wailings". Julian Marszalek of The Quietus found that the album nonetheless demonstrated that "there was far more to Loop than bludgeoning riffs and cranking up the gain control", describing it as "a collection of hypnotic mantras, tracks that used repetition deliberately and methodically to induce a trance-like state."

The song "Shot with a Diamond" contains a vocal sample of Marlon Brando's dialogue from the 1979 film Apocalypse Now.

== Critical reception ==
Professional ratings
Review scores
Source	Rating
AllMusic	4.5/5 stars
Blurt	6/10
The Line of Best Fit	78%
NME	8/10
PopMatters	9/10
Record Collector	5/5 stars
Record Mirror	4/5
Sounds	4.5/5 stars

In a contemporary review for NME, Edwin Pouncey commented that "Loop hammer out a magnificent hypno-beat", characterising A Gilded Eternity as "acid house-style free form rock" suitable "for dancing to as well as listening intently to". Simon Reynolds was less impressed in Melody Maker, declaring the album "a disappointment" and "more of the same" from Loop, "only less so."

Head Heritage reviewer Fwump Bungle wrote in retrospect that A Gilded Eternity showed Loop "at their highest point" with a more rock-oriented sound that distinguished the band's music from that of the shoegaze movement.

== Track listing ==
The original LP release (SITU 27) consisted of two 12-inch discs, played at 45 rpm:

Side A
No.	Title	Length
1.	"Vapour"	6:08
2.	"Afterglow"	5:09

Side B
No.	Title	Length
1.	"The Nail Will Burn"	4:51
2.	"Blood"	5:30

Side C
No.	Title	Length
1.	"Breathe Into Me"	4:37
2.	"From Centre to Wave"	6:01

Side D
No.	Title	Length
1.	"Be Here Now"	9:29
Total length:		41:41

The original CD release (SITU 27 CD) contained ten tracks:

No.	Title	Length
1.	"Vapour"	6:07
2.	"Afterglow"	5:08
3.	"The Nail Will Burn"	4:51
4.	"Blood"	5:29
5.	"Breathe Into Me"	4:37
6.	"From Centre to Wave"	6:00
7.	"Be Here Now"	9:28
8.	"Shot With A Diamond"	5:16
9.	"The Nail Will Burn (Burn Out)"	4:49
10.	"Arc-Lite (Sonar)"	4:28
Total length:		56:13

== Charts ==
Year	Chart	Position
1990	UK Indie Chart	1
1990	UK Albums Chart	39
