= John Goff =

John Goff may refer to:

- John Goff (politician) (1814–1892), Canadian landowner and legislator from Prince Edward Island
- John D. Goff (born 1970), American musician
- John S. Goff (1931–2001), American historian
- John W. Goff (1848–1924), American lawyer and judge from New York City

== See also ==
- John Goffe (1701–1786), soldier in colonial America
- Jonathan Goff (born 1985), former NFL football player
