= G9 =

G9, G.IX, G09 or G-9 has several uses including:

== Organizations ==
- Group of Nine, a group of nine European states
- G9 (consortium), a group of nine Australian internet providers

== Lighting & camera & camera ==
- G9, a standard bipin lightbulb socket (see Bi-pin_lamp_base#Types)
- Canon PowerShot G9, a digital camera
- Panasonic Lumix DC-G9, a mirrorless system camera body

== Science ==
- G9 star, a subclass of G-class stars
- Group 9 elements of the periodic table

== Transport ==
=== Civil transport ===
- County Route G9 (California)
- G9, the IATA airline designator for Air Arabia
- Foton Grand General G9, a mid-size pickup truck

=== Military transport ===
- HMS Quilliam (G09), a WWII British Royal Navy Q-class destroyer
- HMS G9, a WWI G-class British Royal Navy submarine
- Gotha G.IX, a 1918 German bomber aircraft
- Nachtjagdgeschwader 1, a night-fighter wing of the Luftwaffe in World War II.

== Music & media ==
- G9 (album), the debut album of rapper Gloc-9

== Gangs ==
- G9, or FRG9, short for Fòs Revolisyonè G9 an fanmi e alye (Revolutionary Forces of the G9 Family and Allies), a coalition of armed gangs in Haiti

== See also ==
- 9G (disambiguation)
