= 9G =

9G or 9-G can refer to:

- IATA code for Perm Airlines
- IATA code for Galaxy Airways; see List of defunct airlines of Europe
- New York State Route 9G
- Jo in Nine G Hell, debut album by The Hair and Skin Trading Company
- HP 9g, a Hewlett-Packard graphing calculator
- 9G-MKJ; see MK Airlines Flight 1602
- Z-9g, a model of Harbin Z-9
- SSH 9G (WA); see List of former state highways in Washington

== See also ==
- G9 (disambiguation)
