= Loop (band) =

English rock band

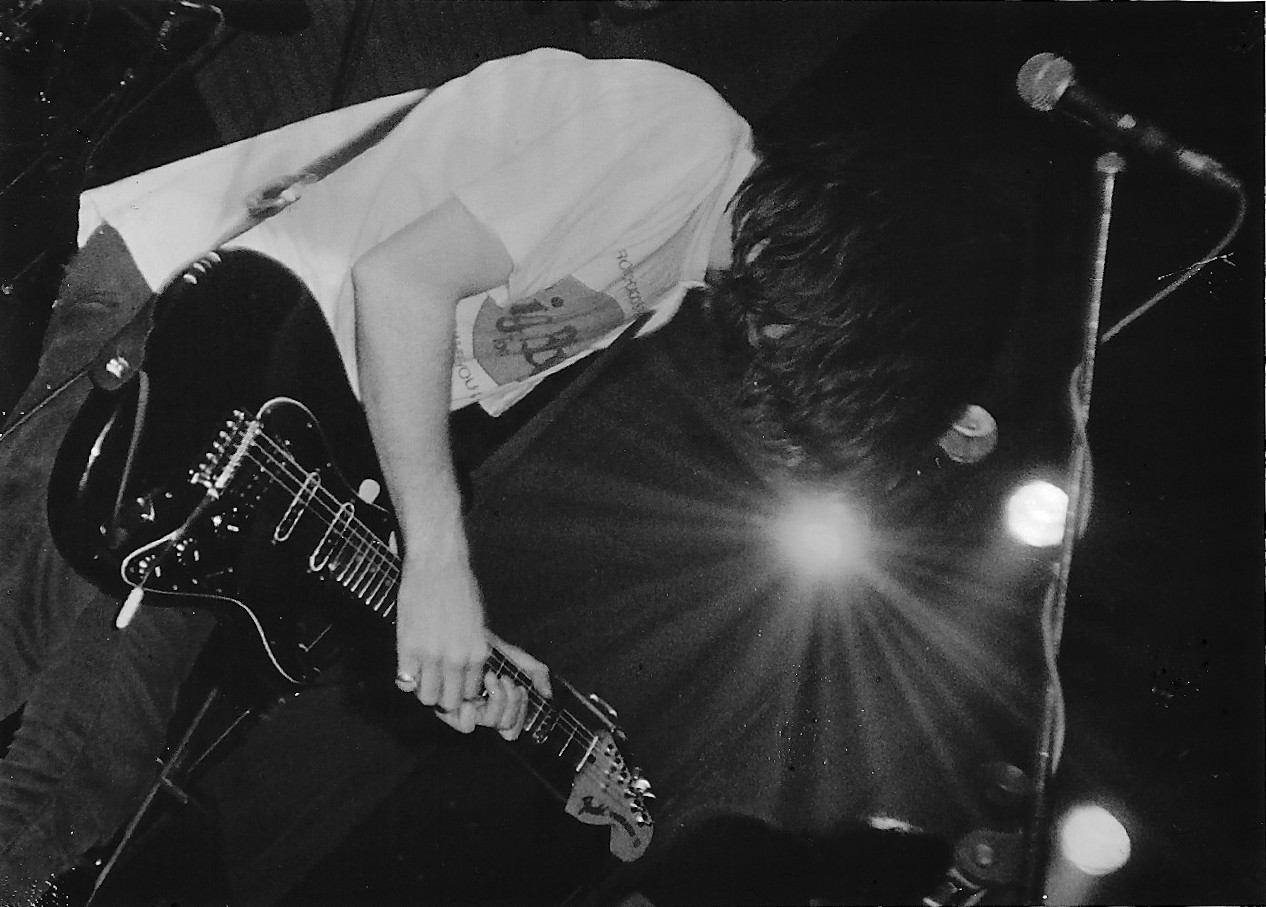
- Loop performing in 1989

Background information
- Origin: Croydon, Surrey, England
- Genres: Space rock; psychedelic rock; drone rock; noise rock
- Years active: 1986–1991, 2013–present
- Labels: Situation Two, Chapter 22 Records, Reactor, Head
- Members: Robert Hampson; Hugo Morgan; Dan Boyd; Wayne Maskell
- Past members: Becky Stewart (Bex); John Wills; Glen Ray; James Endeacott; Neil Mackay; Scott Dowson; Mathew Frith

Loop are an English rock band, formed in 1986 by Robert Hampson in Croydon. The group topped the UK independent charts with their albums Fade Out (1989) and A Gilded Eternity (1990). Their dissonant "trance-rock" sound drew on the work of artists like the Stooges and Can, and helped to resurrect the concept of space rock in the late 1980s.

The group split in 1991, with Hampson going on to form the experimental project Main with guitarist Scott Dawson, and Mackay and Wills forming The Hair and Skin Trading Company. In 2013, the 1989–90 line-up of Hampson, Dawson, John Wills, and Neil Mackay briefly reformed for a series of gigs, and the following year Hampson unveiled a new line-up of the band with himself as the sole original member.

== Career ==
Loop were formed in 1986 by Robert Hampson (vocals, guitar), with his then-girlfriend Becky Stewart on drums. Stewart was later replaced by John Wills (The Servants) and Glen Ray, with James Endeacott on guitar. Their sound was influenced by Krautrock and No Wave influences and relied heavily on three chord riffs. Initially releasing records on Jeff Barrett's Head label, their first release was 1987's "16 Dreams", with debut album Heaven's End following later that year. The band was then signed up by Chapter 22 Records.

Loop returned with a more polished sound with the "Collision" single in 1988. A second album Fade Out followed in 1989, reaching No. 51 on the UK albums chart. Endeacott left the band in 1988, Scott Dowson joined the following year. They changed labels again to Beggars Banquet subsidiary Situation Two, releasing the "Arc-Lite" single in 1989 and the third and final studio album A Gilded Eternity in 1990. The band played at the Reading Festival in 1989.

The band split in 1991, with Hampson briefly joining Godflesh before forming Main with Dowson. Hampson's Main project was discontinued in 2006 and while he now releases under his own name in 2010 he announced the return of Main, albeit as a collaborative project with other sound artists. Wills and Mackay went on to form The Hair and Skin Trading Company, which last released in 1995. Wills now performs and records as Pumajaw.

Loop recorded three Peel sessions for John Peel (11 August 1987, 14 June 1988 and 21 January 1990). A collection of these sessions entitled Wolf Flow was released in 1992. Following the split Loop's official studio albums were re-released on their Reactor label. Some of the records featured cover versions of Suicide, The Pop Group and Can tracks.

Hampson's MySpace pages referred to friendly pressure to again re-release the Loop albums and these were eventually released in November 2008 on the Reactor label.

== Reformation ==
Loop reformed for 2013 and 2014 activities, as presented by a statement from Robert Hampson. The line-up included the original Gilded Eternity era members Robert Hampson, John Wills, Neil Mackay and Scott Dowson. In November 2013, the band played their first comeback show and also co-curated the final holiday camp edition of the All Tomorrow's Parties festival in Camber Sands, England. Wills, wishing to focus on his own musical projects, left the band and was replaced by Wayne Maskell. Loop then played in April 2014 as headliners of the Roadburn Festival, followed by more than 20 dates in the USA, headlining the opening night of Milwaukee Psych Fest 2014 at Cactus Club on 24 April. They concluded this comeback tour with the Primavera Sound festival in Barcelona in May 2014.

In November 2014, a new line-up emerged; still led by Hampson (vocal, guitar), the band performed with Hugo Morgan (bass) and Maskell (drums) from The Heads as well as Dan Boyd (guitar). They played at the Garage (London) and in the Netherlands. Their set featured a new song, "Precession". They also announced they would be playing ATP Iceland 2015.

The band released a four-song EP "Array 1" on ATP Recordings on 22 June 2015.

In June 2018, the band played as part of Robert Smith's curation of the Meltdown Festival.

The first studio album in 31 years, Sonancy, was released on 25 March 2022. It was followed by a UK tour in May 2023.

== Musical style ==
Their musical style has been described as space rock, psychedelic rock, drone rock, and noise rock.

== Members ==
Current

- Robert Hampson – vocals, guitars (1986–1991, 2013–present)
- Hugo Morgan – bass (2014–present)
- Dan Boyd – guitars (2014–present)
- Wayne Maskel – drums (2014–present)

Former

- Becky "Bex" Stewart – drums (1986–1987)
- Glen Ray – bass (1986–1987)
- James Endeacott – guitars (1987–1988)
- John Wills – drums (1987–1990, 2013–2014)
- Neil Mackay – bass (1987–1990, 2013–2014)
- Mathew Frith – guitars (1988–1989)
- Scott Dowson – guitars (1989–1990, 2013–2014)

== Discography ==
=== Albums ===
Year	Title	UK Indie Chart Position	UK Chart Position
1987	Heaven's End	4	-
1989	Fade Out	1	51
1990	A Gilded Eternity	1	39
2022	Sonancy	-	89

=== Compilation albums ===
Month	Year	Title	UK Indie Chart Position	UK Chart Position
September	1988	The World in Your Eyes	4	-
September	1989	Eternal: The Singles	-	-
	1991	Wolf Flow (Peel Sessions 1987-1990)	-	-
	1992	Dual	-	-

=== Singles ===
	Year	Title	Format	UK Indie Chart Position
February	1987	"16 Dreams"	12"	35
July	1987	"Spinning"	7" 12"	7
May	1988	"Collision"	7" 12"	4
December	1988	"Black Sun"	12"	5
December	1989	"Arc-lite"	7" 12" CD	6
May	1991	"Loopflesh / Fleshloop"	7"	
