= Sonancy =

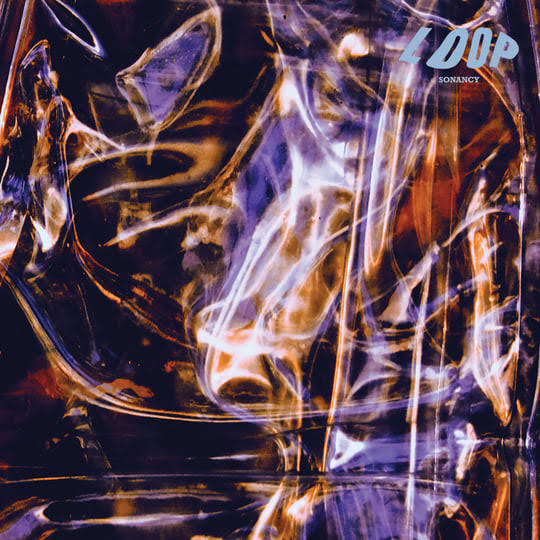

Studio album by Loop
- Released: 25 March 2022
- Recorded: September 2020
- Studio: Joe's Garage, Bristol, United Kingdom
- Genre: Space rock, psychedelic rock, shoegaze
- Length: 41:15
- Label: Reactor
- Producer: Loop

Loop chronology
A Gilded Eternity (1990)	Sonancy (2022)

Sonancy is the fourth studio album by British alternative rock band Loop. It was released in 2022 by Reactor Records and peaked at #89 in the UK Albums Chart.

== Release ==
Sonancy was Loop's first album in 32 years, following on from the critically acclaimed A Gilded Eternity. Robert Hampson announced on social media that the band were getting back in the studio for the first time in 5 years, after their recording of the Array 1 EP. The original release was dated 11 March 2022, but was eventually released on the 25th of the same month, with no explanation from the band on why the release was postponed. The first single to be released from this album was the sixth song on the LP, Halo, released on 18 November 2021. The second single from Sonancy, was Fermion, released a month prior to the album release.

== Track listing ==
No.	Title	Length
1.	"Interference"	4:12
2.	"Eolian"	3:54
3.	"Supra"	5:17
4.	"Penumbra I"	1:46
5.	"Isochrone"	6:15
6.	"Halo"	4:16
7.	"Fermion"	4:18
8.	"Penumbra II"	4:38
9.	"Axion"	3:05
10.	"Aurora"	4:54
Total length:		41:15

== Charts ==
Chart (2022)	Peak position
UK Albums Chart	89
