= Cherche-Midi prison =

Demolished military prison in Paris, France

Coordinates: 48.8500°N 2.3265°E

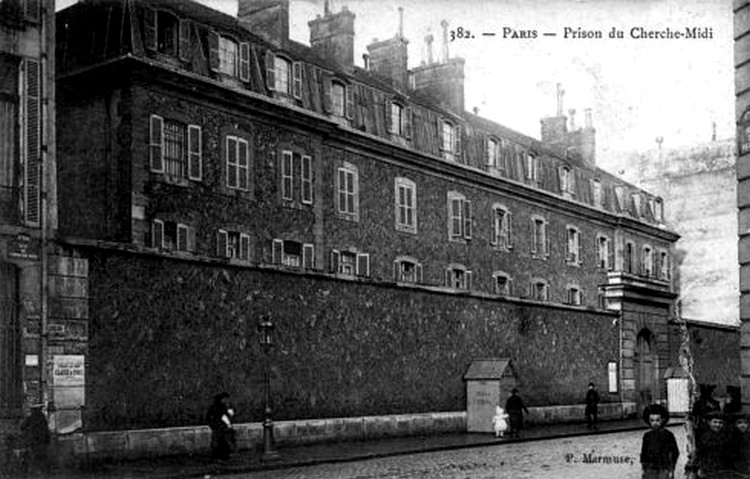

The Cherche-Midi prison was a French military prison located in Paris, France. It housed military prisoners between 1851 and 1947.

Construction on the prison began in 1847, when the former convent of the Daughters of the Good Shepherd was demolished on Rue du Cherche-Midi in Paris. The prison was modeled after the Auburn prison in Auburn, New York, and consisted of 200 solitary confinement cells. The prison population consisted of military personnel convicted of crimes by military tribunal, draft dodgers, deserters and occasional political prisoners. Prisoners were not permitted to talk to each other during the day and were kept isolated in their cells at night.

On June 12, 1940, immediately prior to the German occupation of Paris, the prison was evacuated and prisoners sent to an internment camp near Mauzac. From 1940 to 1944, the prison was used to house political prisoners by the German occupation army. After the liberation of Paris, the prison was used to hold German prisoners of war.

In 1947, all prisoners were transferred to other facilities and the prison was used as a military courthouse until 1950. In 1950, the building was placed under the control of the Ministry of Justice and abandoned. The dilapidated prison was razed in 1966, and in 1968 the École des hautes études en sciences sociales opened on the site of the former prison.

Famous detainees at the prison include Adolphe Feder, Kurt Gerstein, Henri Honoré d'Estienne d'Orves, Alfred Dreyfus, Agnès Humbert, and Rudolf von Ribbentrop.
