= Foton Tunland Yutu =

Foton Tunland Yutu 8
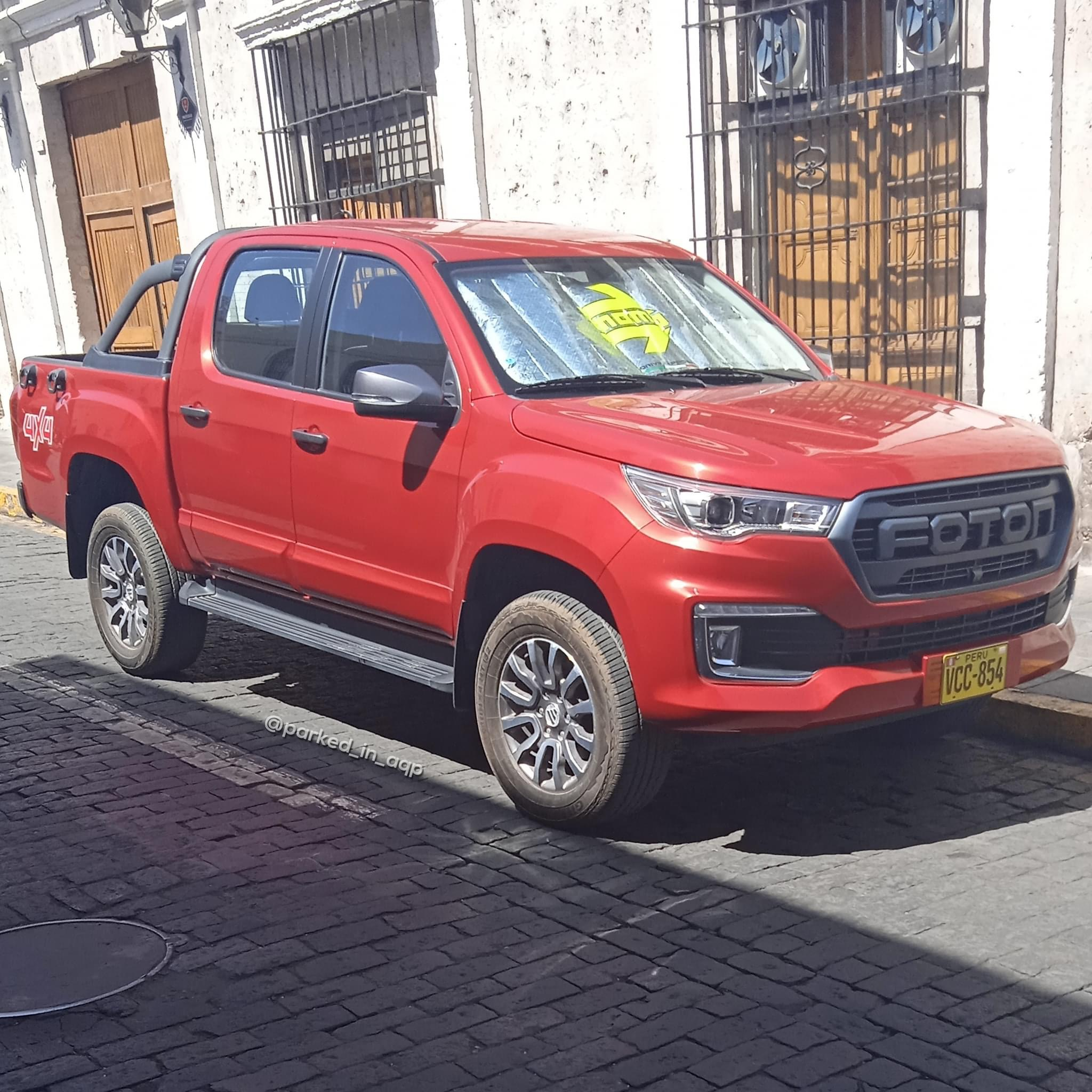

Overview
- Manufacturer: Foton Motor
- Also called: Foton General F9; Foton Grand General G7; Foton Tunland G7 (overseas markets); Foton Thunder (Philippines); Foton eThunland (Electric; Thailand)
- Production: 2019-present
- Assembly: China: Beijing (Foton motor); Iran: Tehran (IKD)

Body and chassis
- Class: Mid-size pickup truck
- Body style: 2-door pickup truck 4-door pickup truck
- Layout: Rear-wheel drive AWD; Rear-motor, rear-wheel-drive (EV)
- Related: Foton Grand General

Powertrain
- Engine: 2.0T gasoline, 2.4L gasoline, and 2.0T diesel
- Electric motor: 130 kW (177 PS) Permanent Magnet syncronus motor on Rear Axle
- Transmission: 6-speed manual gearbox 8-speed automatic gearbox
- Battery: 63.75 or 88.02 kWh CATL LFP

Dimensions
- Wheelbase: 3,110–3,400 mm (122.4–133.9 in)
- Length: 5,340–5,630 mm (210.2–221.7 in)
- Width: 1,940 mm (76.4 in)
- Height: 1,860 mm (73.2 in)

The Foton Tunland Yutu (Chinese: 拓陆者 驭途) is a mid-size pickup truck made by Foton from 2019. The Yutu is available as a few different variants including the Yutu 8 and Yutu 9. A more premium variant called the General F9 is also available from 2022. The Tunland Yutu is sold as the Tunland G7 in overseas markets.

== Overview ==
The Foton Tunland Yutu is available in a few different variants called the Tunland Yutu 8 and Tunland Yutu 9 respectively. In early 2019, leaked information indicates that the maximum power output of the Tunland Yutu is 120 kW (161 hp) and the maximum speed is 165km/h. The maximum torque of the engine is expected to be 350 N⋅m (258 lb⋅ft). Additionally, a 2.0 liter turbo diesel engine code-named 4F20TC is also listed with a maximum power of 125 kW (168 hp) and maximum torque of 400 N⋅m (295 lb⋅ft). The production version Tunland Yutu was launched in December 2019 with a 2.0 liter turbo diesel engine with a maximum output of 120 kW (163 hp) and 390 N⋅m (288 lb⋅ft) and a gasoline version is also offered with an output of 175 kW (238 hp) and 360 N⋅m (266 lb⋅ft). All versions are launched with a 6-speed manual transmission, while the more premium General F9 launched in 2022 was offered with a 8-speed automatic transmission.

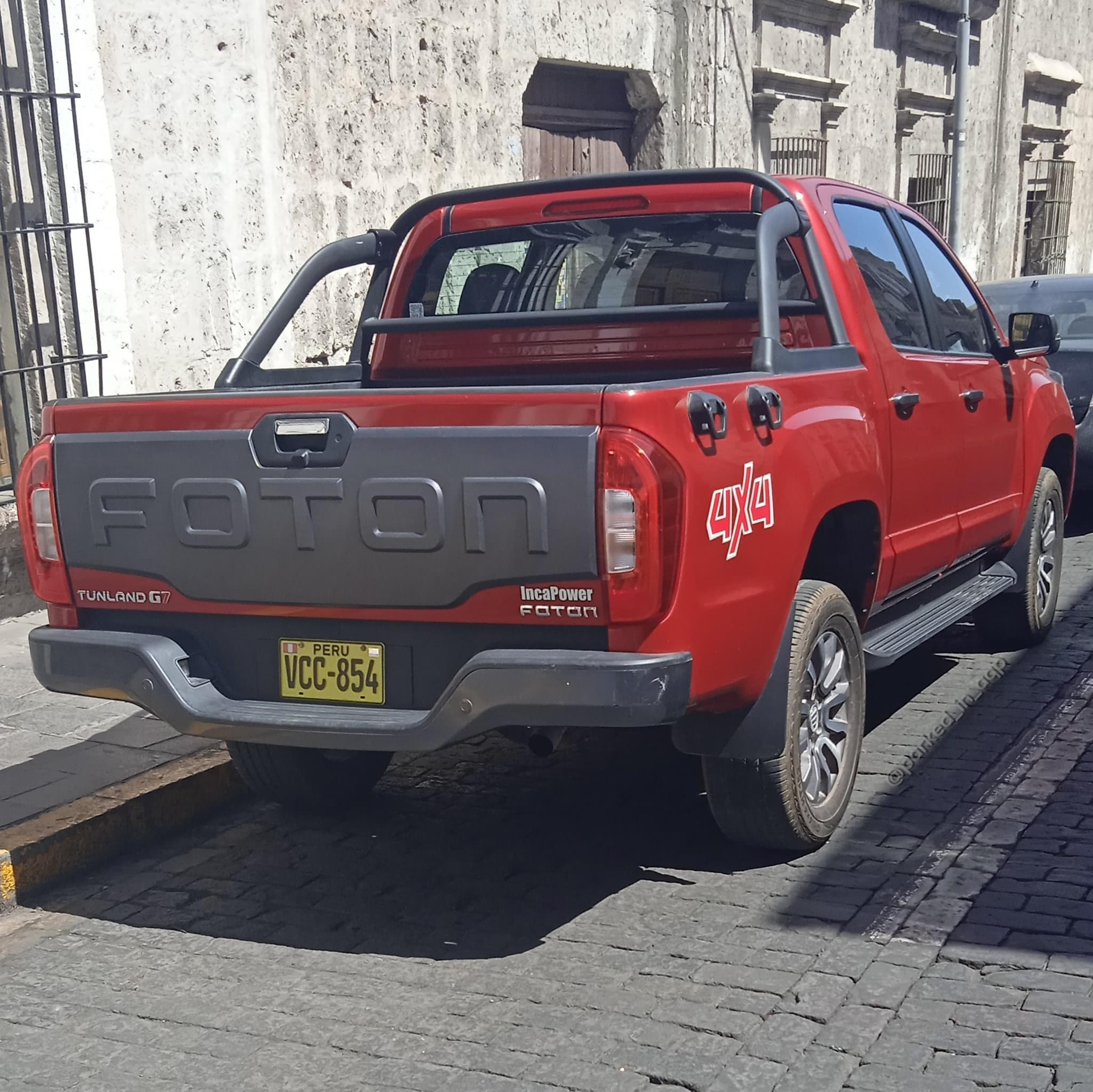
Foton Tunland G7 4x4 rear

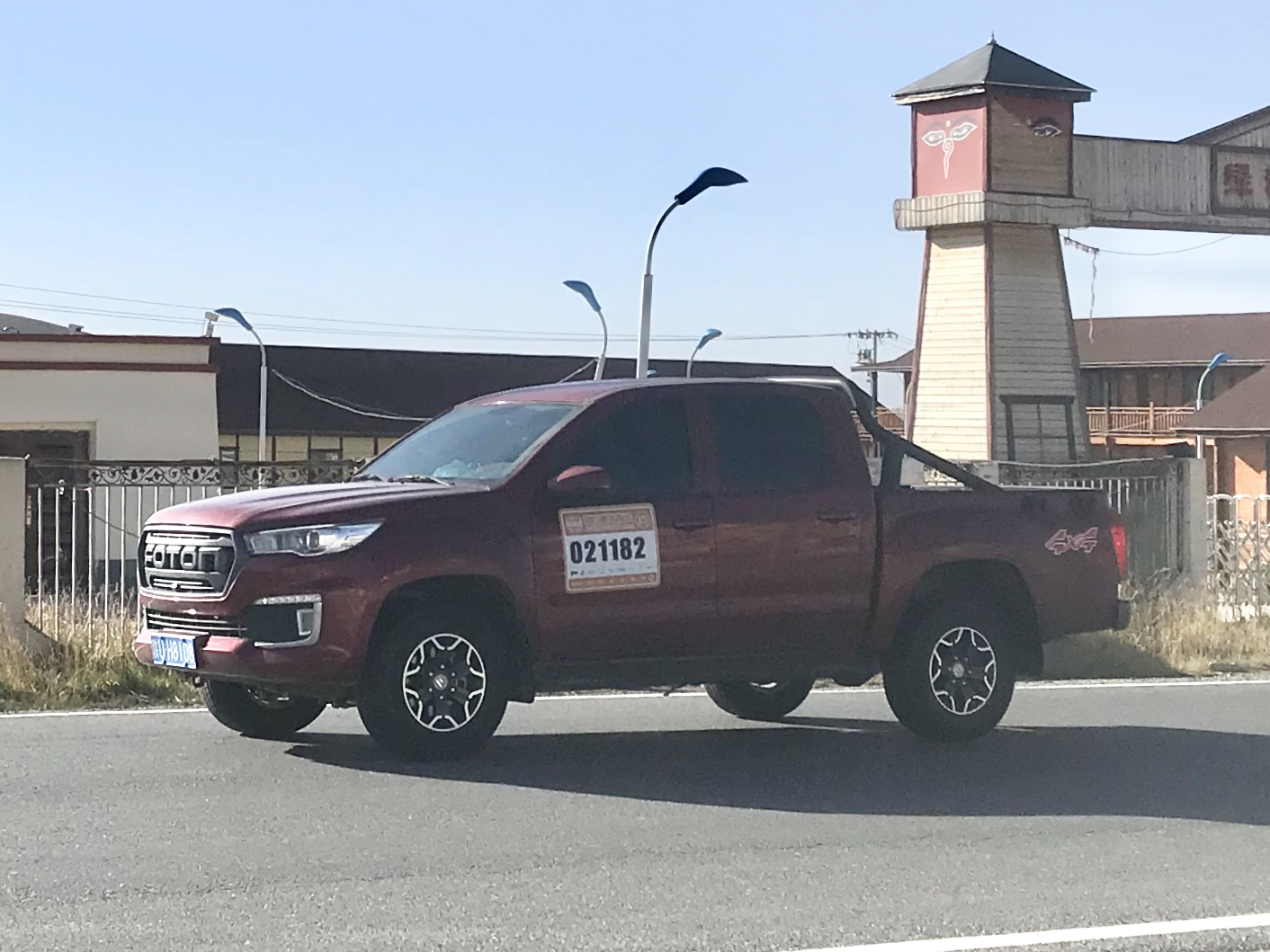
Foton Tunland Yutu 8 front

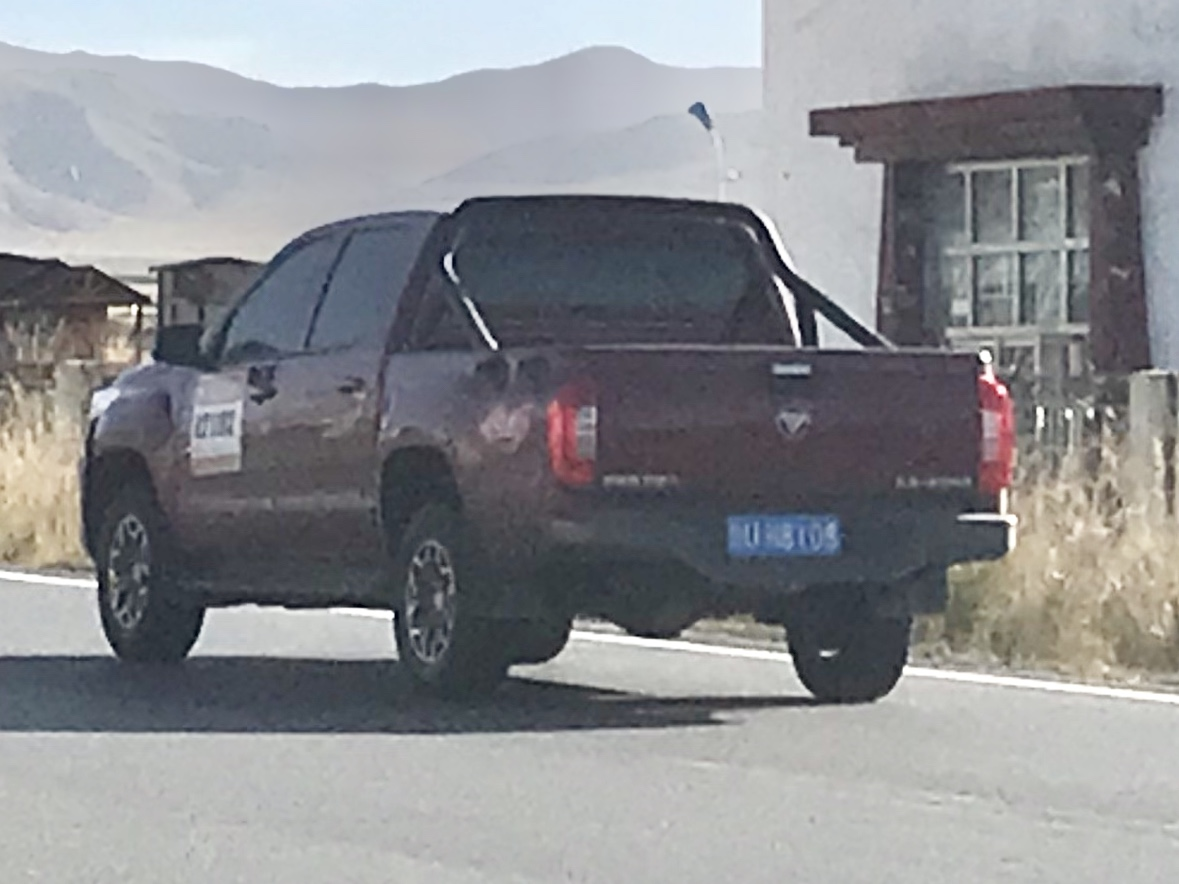
Foton Tunland Yutu 8 rear

=== Foton Grand General G7 ===
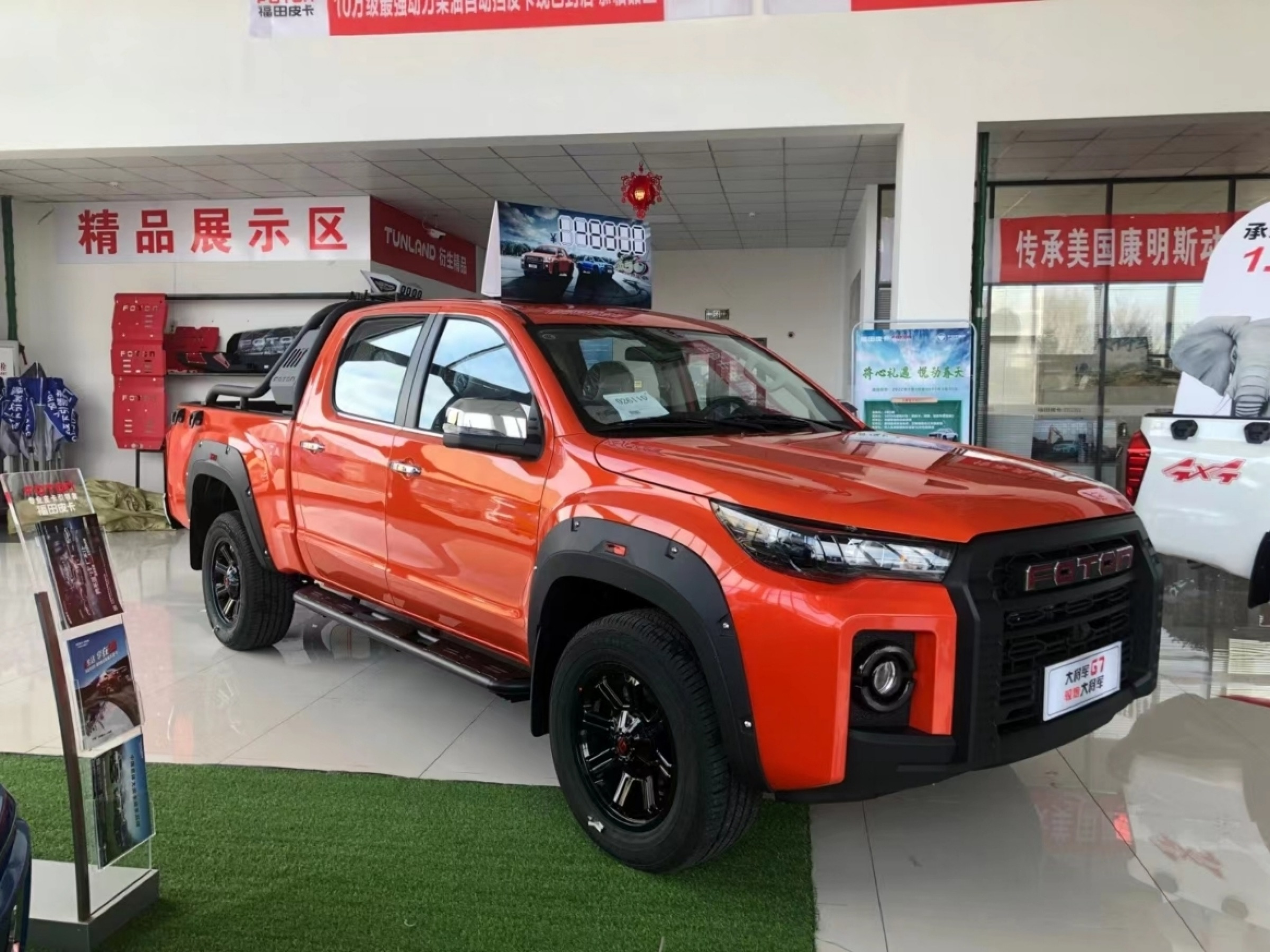
Foton Grand General G7

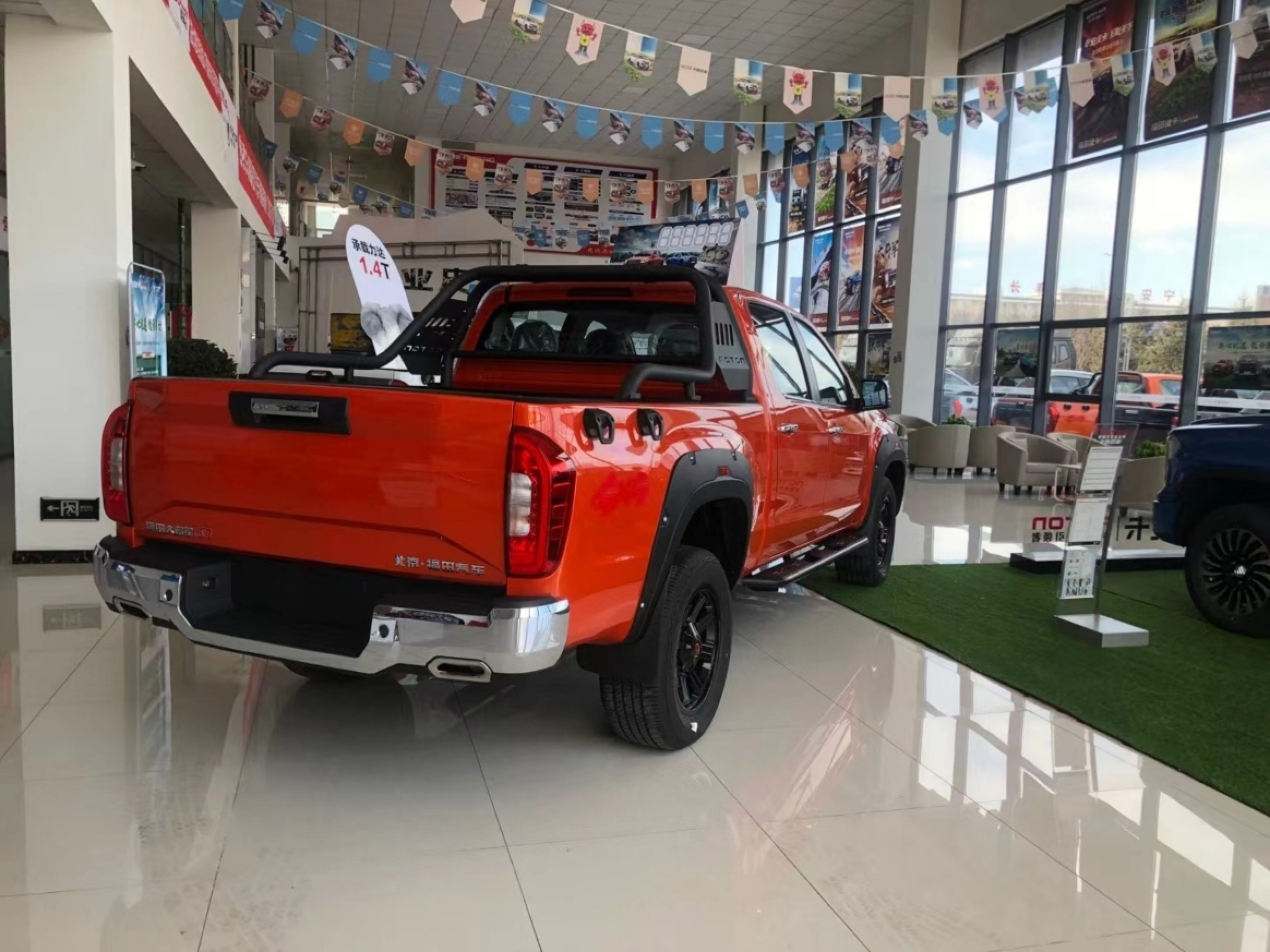
Foton Grand General G7 rear

=== Foton Tunland Electric Pickup ===
On February 11 2022, Foton Tunland pure electric pickup was officially launched with a price of 328,800 yuan (~US$51,753). The Tunland Electric Pickup is based on the regular Tunland Yutu pickup truck and has an official range of 536 kilometers. The Tunland Electric Pickup is equipped with an electric motor with a maximum power output of 130 kilowatts (177 PS) and a maximum torque of 330 Nm. The cargo bed dimension is 1520mm by 1580 bymm 440mm.
