= Fade to Black =

Fade to Black can refer to:

- Fade (lighting), in stage lighting, a change in light level; decreasing the level to complete darkness is a "fade to black"
- Fade to Black (novel), a Nero Wolfe mystery by Robert Goldsborough
- Fade to Black (video game), a 1995 sequel to Flashback

== Film and television ==
- Fade to Black (1980 film), slasher flick starring Dennis Christopher
- Fade to Black (1993 film), made-for-TV thriller starring Heather Locklear
- Fade to Black (2004 film), documentary about rapper Jay-Z
- Fade to Black (2006 film), starring Danny Huston as Orson Welles
- Bleach: Fade to Black (2008 film)
- "Fade to Black" (Taggart), a 2002 television episode

== Music ==
- Fade to Black (Cookie Crew album), 1991
- Fade to Black (Evil Masquerade album), 2009
- Fade to Black: Memories of Johnny, an album by Tommy Cash, or the title song
- "Fade to Black" (Metallica song), 1984
- "Fade to Black" (Nadir Rustamli song), 2022
- "Fade to Black", a song by Dire Straits from On Every Street
- "Fade to Black", a song by Apoptygma Berzerk
- "Fade to Black", a song by Joji and 4batz from the 2026 album Piss in the Wind
