= Fade away =

Fade Away or Fadeaway may refer to:

== Sports ==
- Fadeaway, a basketball move
- Screwball or fadeaway, a baseball pitch

== Music ==
=== Albums ===
- Fade Away (Best Coast EP) (2013)
- Fade Away (Matt Finish EP) (1981)
- Fade Away, an album by Final
- Fade Away, an EP by Song I-han

=== Songs ===
- "Fade Away" (Another Animal song)
- "Fade Away" (Logic song) (2015)
- "Fade Away" (Oasis song)
- "Fade Away" (Bruce Springsteen song) (1980)
- "Fade Away" (Susanne Sundfør song) (2014)
- "Fade Away", a song by The Amity Affliction from Not Without My Ghosts
- "Fade Away", a song by The Black Heart Procession recorded for Infamous 2
- "Fade Away", a song by Blur from The Great Escape
- "Fade Away", a song by Breaking Benjamin from Dear Agony
- "Fade Away", a song by Celine Dion from Taking Chances
- "Fade Away", a song by Celldweller from Celldweller
- "Fade Away", a song by Chris Isaak from Chris Isaak
- "Fade Away", a song by Greg Cipes
- "Fade Away", a song by Coldrain from Until the End
- "Fade Away", a song by Diecast from Internal Revolution
- "Fade Away" (Che Fu song) from Navigator (2001)
- "Fade Away", a song by Juliana Hatfield from Gold Stars 1992–2002: The Juliana Hatfield Collection
- "Fade Away", a song by Junior Byles
- "Fade Away", a song by John McKeown from Things Worth Fighting For
- "Fade Away", a song by Kim Petras
- "Fade Away", a song by The Kid Laroi
- "Fade Away", a song by Loz Netto, guitarist for Sniff 'n' the Tears (1983)
- "Fade Away", a song by Mary J. Blige from Growing Pains
- "Fade Away", a song by Pain from Nothing Remains the Same
- "Fadeaway", a song by Porcupine Tree from Up the Downstair
- "Fade Away", a song by Seether from Disclaimer and Disclaimer II
- "Fade Away", a song by Texas from Ricks Road
- "Fade Away", a song by We Came as Romans from Tracing Back Roots
- "Fade Away", a song by The Word Alive from Hard Reset
- "Fadeaway", a song by ZZ Ward from Dirty Shine

== Other uses ==
- Fade Away (novel), a novel by Harlan Coben

== See also ==
- Fadeaway Man, a supervillain in the DC Comics universe
- "Fading Away", a 1988 song by Will to Power
- Not Fade Away (disambiguation)
