= The Hair and Skin Trading Company =

British alternative rock band

The Hair and Skin Trading Company is a British alternative rock group whose music touches on post-punk, shoegaze, drone, noise rock, post rock and experimental music.

The group was formed in 1991 by two former members of Loop: Neil Mackay (vocals/bass) and John Wills (drums). They were joined by Nigel Webb (guitars) and Richard Johnston on samples. Johnston left as a band member during the recording of the first album, but periodically collaborated as a live engineer adding sound effects and also contributing to their album Psychedelische Musique.

They released their debut album Jo in Nine G Hell on Beggars Banquet Records in 1992. They also played the Reading Festival that year, with tours of Europe, US and the UK, following their subsequent releases - with shows at CBGB's and the Knitting Factory, New York & Festivals such as C.M.J - New York, Roskilde Festival, Denmark and Phoenix Festival, United Kingdom.

Their first two albums bear influences of My Bloody Valentine and The Skids, while the vocal delivery has been compared to Mark E. Smith of The Fall. By the third album Psychedelische Musique (1995), the band was drawing influence from Faust and had dispensed with many conventional rock elements. Few of its songs bear titles, they are instead denoted by either obscure combinations of letters or symbols.

They released their fourth album on 1 September 2019, I Don't Know Where You Get Those Funny Ideas From on Escape Velocity / Bandcamp, having released a new track "Nihil" on 12 October 2018 on the Music 2 Heal The Earth compilation album (Farmadelica Sound).

== Related acts ==
As of 2022, Wills records and performs as Pumajaw.

Mackay formed a band with his then-wife Kim Hannibal called Juicy Eureka and released an album for Lissy's Records titled Making Things Up and Then Forgetting Them.

Mackay and Webb played several gigs around London with Tony Irving in a free noise / jazz band called Unity Gain, releasing a lathe cut LP in January 2014 titled Sounds from the Room. Webb continues to make music under the name Micro / Nigel Webb and Digital Signal Recordings with a number of new projects in progress.

== Discography ==
- Ground Zero [EP Situation Two] – 1992
- Jo in Nine G Hell [Album -Vinyl, CD, Cassette, Download - Situation Two, Alpha Japan] – 1992
- Over Valence [Album-Vinyl, CD, Cassette, Download Beggars Banquet] – 1993
- Loa [single, Clear Vinyl, CD Beggars Banquet] – 1993
- Go round [EP] [vinyl, CD- Beggars Banquet] – 1993
- K-Funk [flexi 7" single w/Pram Too Pure/Beggars Banquet] – 1993
- Deafening Divinities With Aural Affinities [compilation Beggars Banquet] – 1993
- Emission 002 [compilation Labels France] – 1993
- Beggars Banquet The Singles Collection [compilation Beggars Banquet] – 1994
- Monsters, Robots and Bug Men- A User's Guide To The Rock Hinterland [Virgin Records compilation] – 1996
- Psychedelische Musique (Lava Surf Kunst) [Album Vinyl, CD, Freek Records] – 1995
- Brighton/Highbury/Brixton/Crouch End [EP - Aquese Recordings] – 1996
- Music2 Heal the Earth [compilation Farmadelica Sound] – 2018
- I Don't Know Where You Get Those Funny Ideas From – 2019
