= Rudolf von Ribbentrop =

German Waffen-SS officer (1921–2019)

- Rudolf in London, October 1936
- Born: 11 May 1921; Wiesbaden, Weimar Republic
- Died: 20 May 2019 (aged 98); Ratingen, Germany
- Burial place: Friedhof Wiesbaden-Biebrich
- Relatives: Joachim von Ribbentrop (father)
- Military career
- Allegiance: Nazi Germany
- Branch: Waffen-SS
- Service years: 1939–1945
- Rank: SS-Hauptsturmführer
- Units: Leibstandarte SS Adolf Hitler; SS Division Hitlerjugend
- Conflicts: World War II; Third Battle of Kharkov; Battle of the Bulge (surrendered)
- Awards: Knight's Cross of the Iron Cross; German Cross in Gold; Cross of Liberty, 4th class (Finland)
- Other work: Author

Rudolf von Ribbentrop (11 May 1921 – 20 May 2019) was a German Waffen-SS officer who served and was decorated in World War II, and later became a wine merchant. His father was Nazi diplomat and Foreign Minister Joachim von Ribbentrop. His autobiography gave further insight into his father and the last days of Adolf Hitler.

== Early life ==
Rudolf von Ribbentrop was born in Wiesbaden as one of five children to Joachim von Ribbentrop. His father was appointed as German Ambassador to the United Kingdom in 1936 and was accompanied to London by Rudolf. Enrolled in Westminster School, he later returned to a boarding school in Germany after The Times learned of his presence.

== World War II ==
On 1 September 1939, when World War II started, Ribbentrop joined as a private soldier in the SS-Infantry Regiment Deutschland ('Germany'), with which he served on the Western Front, receiving the Iron Cross second class. During Operation Barbarossa, the invasion of the Soviet Union, his unit was sent to Finland. He was assigned to a Panzer regiment the Leibstandarte SS Adolf Hitler division and sent to Kharkov in February 1943, where he took part in the Third Battle of Kharkov.

Ribbentrop was awarded the Knight's Cross of the Iron Cross on 15 July 1943. On 1 August he was transferred to the newly formed SS Division Hitlerjugend as a training officer and company commander. During battles in Normandy, Ribbentrop was awarded the German Cross in Gold. Following the breakout from Falaise, he saw action during the Battle of the Bulge. Ribbentrop was wounded several times during the war, including during the fighting in Normandy. He surrendered with the division to the US Army on 8 May 1945. Ribbentrop was "taken aback" by the American artillery barrages in Normandy, later saying "the Americans threw everything at us, particularly artillery … it put everything that we had previously undergone into the shade".

== Post-war ==
Ribbentrop spent over three years in American, British, and French custody. While in custody, he was accused of shooting two Canadian prisoners of war, one of them fatally, during an interrogation in France, but the charges could not be proven. Ribbentrop was released from Cherche-Midi Prison in July 1948. Afterwards, he became a wine merchant and wrote his memoirs, which gave fresh insight into his father's career and the final days of Adolf Hitler. His work included previously unpublished photographs of his family and Hitler.

== Works ==
- My Father Joachim von Ribbentrop: Hitler's Foreign Minister, Experiences and Memories. Pen and Sword Books. 25 April 2019. ISBN 9781526739254. OL 36238276M.

== Sources ==
- "Rudolf von Ribbentrop, decorated officer in the Nazi Waffen-SS and son of Hitler's trusted foreign minister – obituary". The Daily Telegraph. 29 May 2019.
- "Rudolf von Ribbentrop". Deutsche Digitale Bibliothek.
- "Obituary: Rudolf von Ribbentrop". Irish Independent. 2 June 2019.
- Ribbentrop, Rudolf von (30 July 2019). My Father Joachim von Ribbentrop: Hitler's Foreign Minister, Experiences and Memories. Pen and Sword Books. ISBN 978-1-5267-3926-1. OL 36345929M.
- Sandomir, Richard (2019). "Rudolf Von Ribbentrop, Son of Top Nazi Diplomat, Dies at 98". New York Times.
- Scherzer, Veit [in German] (2007). Ritterkreuzträger 1939–1945 [The Knight's Cross Bearers 1939–1945] (in German) (2nd ed.). Ranis: Verlag Veit Scherzer. ISBN 978-3-938845-17-2. OCLC 891773959. Wikidata Q131160320.
- "Obituary Rudolf von Ribbentrop". The Times. 2019.
- Trigg, Jonathan (2020). To VE-Day through German Eyes: The Final Defeat of Nazi Germany. Stroud, UK: Amberley Publishing. ISBN 978-1-4456-9944-8.
