= Joseph Hansen (writer) =

American crime writer and poet (1923–2004)

- Born: July 19, 1923; Aberdeen, South Dakota, U.S.
- Died: November 24, 2004 (aged 81); Laguna Beach, California, U.S.
- Occupation: Writer
- Spouse: Jane Bancroft (m. 1943; died 1994)
- Children: 1
- Writing career
- Pen name: James Colton; Rose Brock
- Language: English
- Years active: 1952–2004
- Genre: Crime fiction
- Notable work: Fadeout (1970)
- Notable awards: Lambda Literary Award for Gay Fiction

Joseph Hansen (July 19, 1923 – November 24, 2004) was an American crime writer and poet, best known for a series of novels featuring private eye Dave Brandstetter.

The Joseph Hansen Awards are named after him.

== Life and works ==
Hansen was born on July 19, 1923, in Aberdeen, South Dakota. His father owned a shoe store in Aberdeen, but it closed during the Great Depression. When Hansen was ten, the family moved to Minneapolis, Minnesota; later, the family moved to Altadena, California, where a sister lived.

Hansen had begun writing at the age of nine; his first published work, a poem, appeared in The New Yorker, in 1952. Throughout the 1950s and 1960s, he had several part-time jobs in bookstores and magazines. He continued writing poetry for various magazines, one of which was ONE, the first pro-gay publication in the United States. In 1965, Hansen wrote his first novel Strange Marriage, published under the pseudonym "James Colton". He also briefly sang as a part of a folk music group, hosted a radio show called Homosexuality Today, and helped organize the first Gay Pride Parade in Hollywood.

In 1970, Hansen published Fadeout, his first novel to be published under his own name. The novel also introduces his series character Dave Brandstetter, an openly gay insurance investigator who still embodied the tough, no-nonsense personality of the classic hardboiled private investigator protagonist. Brandstetter has been cited as a groundbreaking character in gay fiction and crime fiction. Hansen published eleven further books featuring Brandstetter, ending with A Country of Old Men in 1991. Hansen won the 1992 Lifetime Achievement Award from the Private Eye Writers of America, as well as a Lambda Literary Award for Gay Mystery from the Lambda Literary Foundation for A Country of Old Men. Hansen created a second private investigator character, Hack Bohannon, a former deputy sheriff who quits the force after fourteen years because of his disapproval of a whitewashed homicide inquiry, and runs a horse farm. He collected five novellas in his 1988 book Bohannon's Book (Countryman Press, 1988; paperback reprint, Penguin, 1989 [ISBN 014012053X). A sequel, also collecting five novellas, appeared in 1993 as Bohannon's Country (Penguin, 1993 ISBN 0670849421). In 1993, Hansen won another Lambda Literary Award for Gay Fiction for Living Upstairs (1993).

In addition to crime novels, Hansen wrote the more mainstream novel A Smile In His Lifetime (1981), a non-genre novel about a married gay man who achieves fame, divorces his wife, and heads into a string of homosexual relationships both good and bad. Another mainstream novel Job's Year, was published in 1983. He also wrote two suspense novels in the early 1980s, and two gothic novels in the 1970s under the pseudonym "Rose Brock".

== Personal life ==
Hansen was married to artist Jane Bancroft, a lesbian, from 1943 to her death in 1994. He said their relationship was that of "a gay man and a woman who happened to love each other." They were married for 51 years. Bancroft was an artist, scholar and teacher. She was born in Boston on February 4, 1917, and grew up in El Paso. She was an animal lover and rescued and sheltered strays. She died on September 9, 1994, following a stroke. Following her death, Joseph Hansen wrote the poem The Dark/The Diary (In memoriam: J.B.H., 1917-1994). The couple had one child, Barbara, who later transitioned and changed his name to Daniel James Hansen. According to a friend quoted in an obituary, Hansen also had two long-term male lovers.

Hansen disliked the term "gay" and always described himself as "homosexual".

Hansen died from heart failure in 2004 at his home in Laguna Beach, California.

== Bibliography ==
- One Foot in the Boat (poetry) (1977) (Momentum Press)
- The Dog and Other Stories (1979) (Momentum Press)
- Backtrack (1982) (Foul Play Press)
- Pretty Boy Dead (1984) (Gay Sunshine Press)
- Brandstetter & Others: Five Fictions (1984) (Foul Play Press)
- A Smile in his Lifetime (1985) (Plume)
- Steps Going Down (1985) (Foul Play Press) (1986) (Arlington)
- Bohannon's Book: Five Mysteries (1988) (Foul Play Press)
- Bohannon's Country (1993) (Viking Penguin)
- Living Upstairs (1994) (Plume)
- Jack of Hearts (1995) (Dutton)
- A Few Doors West of Hope : The Life and Times of Dauntless Don Slater (1998) (Homosexual Information Center)
- Blood, Snow, & Classic Cars: Mystery Stories (2001) (Leyland Publications)
- Bohannon's Women (2003) (Five Star)

=== Dave Brandstetter mysteries ===
- Fadeout (1970) (Harper and Row)
- Death Claims (1973) (Harper and Row) (1973) (Harrap)
- Troublemaker (1975) (Harper and Row)
- The Man Everybody Was Afraid Of (1978) (Holt, Rinehart) (1978) (Faber)
- Skinflick (1979) (Holt, Rinehart)
- Gravedigger (1982) (Holt, Rinehart)
- Nightwork (1984) (Holt, Rinehart)
- Brandstetter & Others: Five Fictions (1984) (Norton)
- The Little Dog Laughed (1986) (Holt, Rinehart)
- Early Graves (1987) (Mysterious Press)
- Obedience (1988) (Mysterious Press)
- The Boy Who Was Buried This Morning (1990) (Viking Penguin)
- A Country of Old Men (1991) (Viking Penguin)
- The Complete Brandstetter: Twelve Novels (No Exit Press, 2007) ISBN 978-1-84243-168-9

=== As Rose Brock ===
- Longleaf (1974) (Harrap)
- Tarn House (1975) (Harrap)

=== As James Colton ===
- Strange Marriage (1965) (Argyle) (1966) (Paperback Library)
- Lost on Twilight Road (1966) (National Library Books)
- The Corrupter and other stories (1968) (Greenleaf)
- Known Homosexual (1968) (Brandon House)
- Cocksure (1969) (Greenleaf Classics)
- Hang-up (1969) (Brandon House)
- Gard (1969) (Award Books)
- The Outward Side (1971) (Traveller's Companion) (1995) (Hard Candy, Masquerade Books)
- Todd (1995) (Hard Candy, Masquerade Books)
