= Abraham Reif =

Poet (1802–1859)

- Born: 1802; Mościska, Galicia, Habsburg Empire
- Died: 1859 (aged 56–57)
- Spouse: Yente Reif
- Writing career
- Language: Hebrew

Abraham Reif (Hebrew: אברהם רייף; 1802–1859) was a Galician Jewish poet.

Born in Mościska in 1802, he came early under the influence of the school of the Me'assefim, but subsequently broke away from the movement. Tobias Feder deeply influenced his literary work. Alexander Langbank introduced Reif to the secular sciences, and after Reif's death he purchased from his widow, Yente, all his posthumous works.

Reif open a school for the study of the Torah and the Hebrew language in his native city, which produced a number of prominent Hebraists. His chief dramas, Ha-Nidka'im, Shulamit, and Yehudit, vividly portray the life of the Galician Jews. As he was too poor to publish his works, he gave manuscript copies of them to his pupils.
