= John Goff (politician) =

Canadian politician

John Goff (1814 – 1892) was a land owner and political figure on Prince Edward Island. He was a member of the Legislative Assembly of Prince Edward Island in 1854 and from 1860 to 1863.

He was born in Charlottetown, the son of Fade Goff and Mary S. Ryan, and was educated there. In 1836, he took over the operation of his father's large estate at Launching. In 1840, he settled on a large farm at Woodville (later Woodville Mills), where he built sawmills and grist mills. Goff married Elizabeth Hayden. He was named to the Legislative Council of Prince Edward Island in 1863. Goff also served as high sheriff and chief magistrate for Kings County, as a member of the school board, as a member of the road commission and as a member of the court that settled small debts.

His former home in Woodville Mills was granted heritage designation by the Prince Edward Island government in 2006.
