= Tobias Gutmann Feder =

Galician Maskilic writer (c.1760–1817)

- Born: c. 1760; Przedbórz, Sandomierz Voivodeship, Poland
- Died: 1817; Ternopil, Galicia, Austrian Empire
- Writing career
- Language: Hebrew

Tobias Gutmann Feder (Hebrew: טוביה בן צבי הירש גוטמאן פעדער, romanized: Tuviah ben Tzvi Hirsch Gutman Feder; (Note: Also known as טוביהו בן צבי הירש גוטמאן פעדער, romanized: Tuviahu ben Tzvi Hirsch Gutman Feder.) c. 1760, Przedbórz – 1817, Ternopil) was a Galician Maskilic writer, poet, and grammarian.

He wandered through Galicia, Poland, and Russia with his family as an itinerant scholar, supporting himself financially by working as a teacher, proofreader, merchant, scribe, cantor, and preacher.

== Work ==
Feder's first book, Bayit ne'eman (1794) which means in Hebrew faithful home/house, was an ethical treatise on truth. This was followed by an elegy on the death of the Vilna Gaon, entitled Kol nehi (1798). Like the Gaon, Feder was a bitter opponent of Ḥasidism and mysticism; to this end, he wrote Zemir aritzim, a satirical polemic against the Ḥasidic movement.

In 1804, Feder published Lahat ha-ḥerev, an attack on modern Biblical criticism directed against Aaron Wolfssohn and Isaac Satanov. The same year he released Mevasser tov, an introduction to Hebrew grammar with a criticism of the Masorah commentary Menorat Shlomo, by Rabbi Phoebus of Dubrovno. Feder also wrote Kol meḥatzetzim ('Voice of the Archers', 1813), a bitter satire against Menachem Mendel Lefin for his Yiddish translation of the Book of Proverbs. The controversial work circulated in manuscript among Maskilim, but was first published only in 1853 in an expurgated version.

He composed two poems on the defeat of the French in Russia: Kol simḥah ve-sason (1814) which means in Hebrew a voice of happiness and joy, a song of triumph written for the Jewish community of Berdychev, and Hatzlaḥat Aleksander (1814), an ode to Alexander I of Russia.

Additional works by Feder were published after his death, including a rhymed play entitled Adam ve-Ḥavah ('Adam and Eve'), the Zohar ḥadash le-Purim, a humorous parody for Purim in Aramaic, and Shem u-she'erit, a volume of literary epistles and poems.

Feder deeply influenced the literary work of the Galician Jewish poet Abraham Reif.
