= Dege Feder =

Ethiopian-Israeli artist and choreographer

- דגה פדר
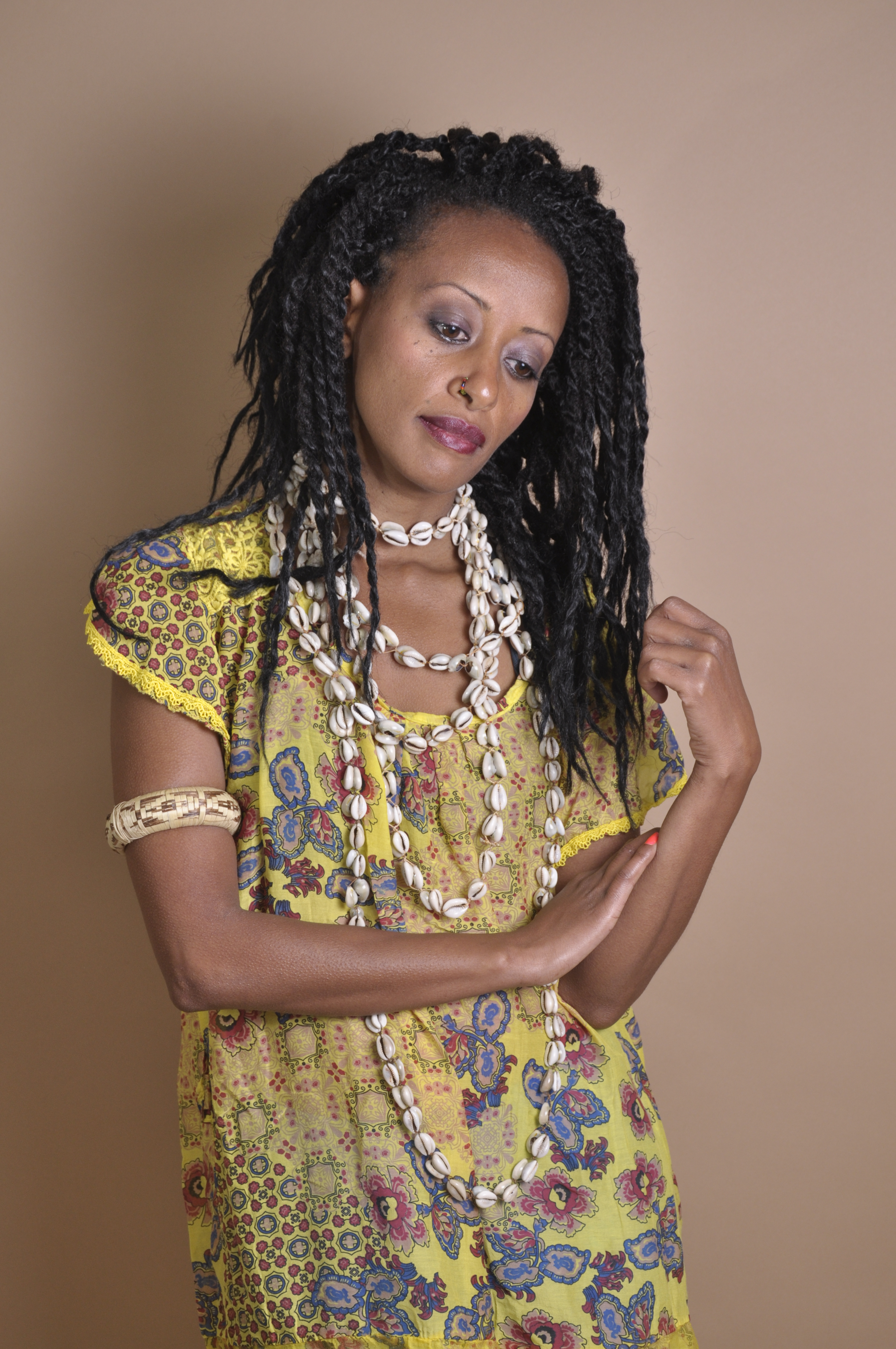
- Born: 1978 (age 47–48); Gondar, Ethiopia
- Education: University of Hafia
- Occupations: artist, dancer
- Awards: “Ministry of Immigration” Prize for special artistic achievements and contribution to Israeli society 2021

Dege Feder (Hebrew: דגה פדר; born 1978) is an Ethiopian-born multi-disciplinary artist, singer, painter, and dancer. She is based in Israel. She is the choreographer and manager of the Beta dance company, a musician and visual artist. Feder uniquely combines the motifs of traditional Ethiopian dance with modern and Israeli dance.

== Biography ==
Dege Feder was born in the Gondar district of Ethiopia. She immigrated to Israel with her family in 1985 as part of Operation Moses. She began her dance career as a dancer in Ruth Eshel's Eskesta Ethiopian dance troupe, and choreographed several of the troupe's numbers. In 2005 she receiver her BEd in Arts Education from University of Haifa, and since that time has continued working with the Beta dance troupe, formed by the founding dancers of Esketa. She became the troupe's manager in 2014.

In 2021 Feder received the “Ministry of Immigration” Prize for special artistic achievements and contribution to Israeli society.

== Career ==
=== Dance and choreography ===
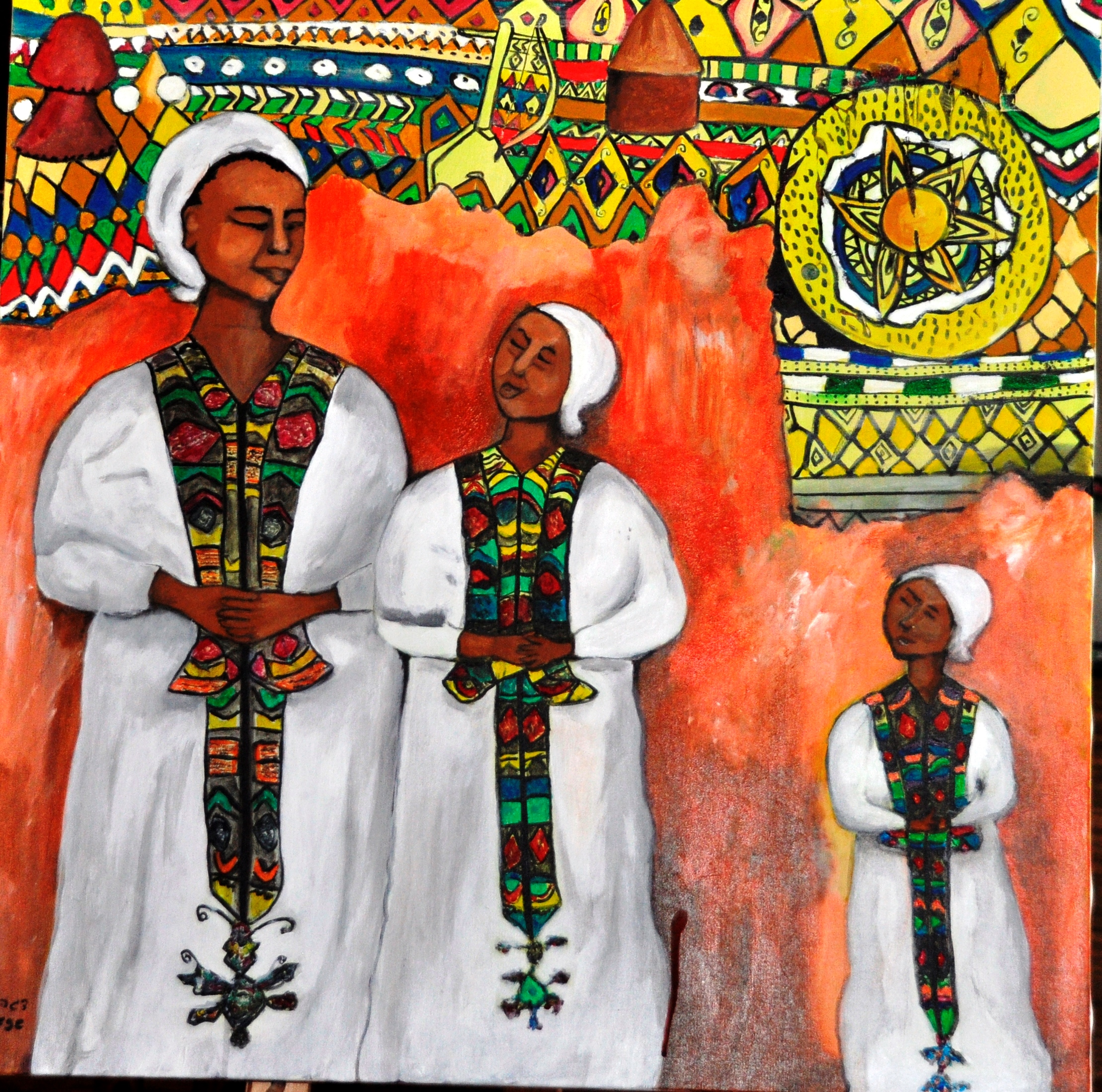
The Sublime – Acrylic on Canvas

From 1999 to 2005, Feder performed with Esketa in leading roles, and participated in leading venues in Israel, such as the Suzanne Dellal Center for Dance and Theater, and in festivals both in Israel and abroad (such as in Croatia, Ukraine, France, South Africa, New York, Philadelphia, Boston and Chicago).

Feder is the founder of several youth dance companies, including Desta and Tezeta, which perform all across Israel, and for many years worked as a youth dance teacher in schools and boarding schools for underprivileged youth.

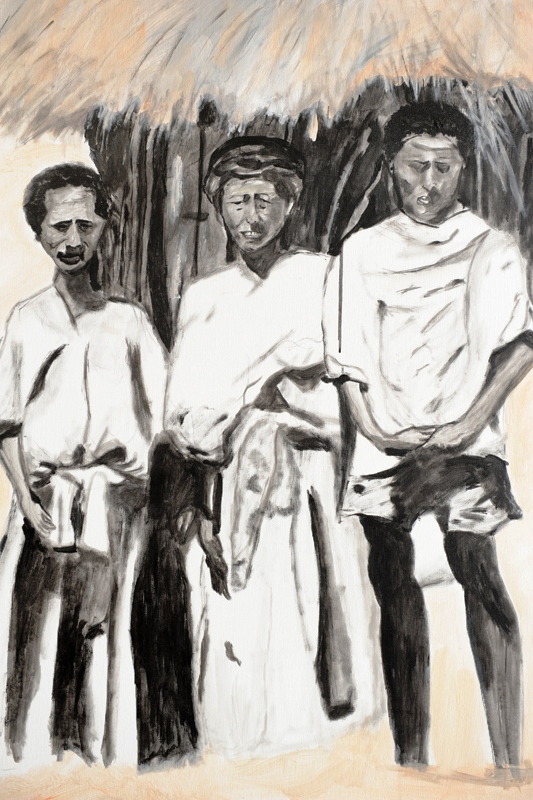
Memories – Acrylic on Canvas

In 2005, when Feder starting working with Beta, the company was invited to perform in the US, Colombia, Poland, Ecuador and Ethiopia.

=== Music ===
In 2009, Feder sang with the Haifa Symphony Orchestra.

In 2011, she started a project called "Degedrum", with percussionist Elad Neeman, in which she both danced and sang. The program toured in the US and Israel. In the same year, she recorded an album of original music set to poems in Amharic and Hebrew, accompanied by Lela, an Ethiopian fusion musical group she founded, which is dedicated to performing her songs on traditional instruments.

=== Visual arts ===
Feder paints mostly with acrylic on canvas. Her art also combines the motifs and memories of Ethiopia, with special emphasis on imagery of women.

== See also ==
- Operation Moses
