= Not Fade Away =

Not Fade Away may refer to:

== Music ==
- "Not Fade Away" (song), a 1957 song by Buddy Holly, covered by many others
- Not Fade Away (Nitty Gritty Dirt Band album), a 1992 album by the Nitty Gritty Dirt Band
- Not Fade Away (Remembering Buddy Holly), a 1996 tribute album
- Not Fade Away (David Kitt album), a 2006 album by David Kitt

== Television episodes ==
- "Not Fade Away" (Angel), the series finale
- "Not Fade Away" (Fear the Walking Dead)
- "Not Fade Away", episode of Hercules: The Legendary Journeys

== Other uses ==
- Not Fade Away (film), a 2012 film directed by David Chase
- Not Fade Away, a play by Richard Cameron
- Not Fade Away, a novel by Jim Dodge
