= Fade Goff =

Canadian politician

Fade Goff (17 September 1780 – 6 January 1836) was a land agent and political figure in Prince Edward Island. He represented Georgetown in the Legislative Assembly of Prince Edward Island from 1812 to 1818.

He was born in Bryanstown, County Wexford, Ireland, the son of Richard Goff. In 1809, he married Mary Somaindyke Ryan, the daughter of John Ryan. That same year, he emigrated to St. John's in Newfoundland to join his father-in-law. There he met John Stewart who hired Goff as his agent for his property in Prince Edward Island and he moved to the island the following year. Goff also later became agent for George and Alexander Birnie. He found that the role of land agent left him in a position of permanent financial obligation to his employers. He attempted to profit by other activities, such as operating a flour mill and an emigration office, without much success. In 1813, he was named coroner and clerk of the crown by William Townshend, colonial administrator. Goff also was named a justice of the peace and was appointed high sheriff in 1831. He was named to the colony's Council in 1832. He died at Erinvale in Lot 34 after a lengthy illness.

His son John also served in the provincial assembly.
