= Fade to Grey =

Fade to Grey may refer to:

- "Fade to Grey" (Visage song), 1980
  - Fade to Grey – The Singles Collection (reissued as Fade to Grey – The Best of Visage), a 1983 compilation album by synthpop group Visage
- "Fade to Grey" (Jars of Clay song), 1998
