= Fader (surname) =

Fader is a surname. Notable people with the surname include:

- Douglas Fader, Canadian Cross of Valour recipient
- Fernando Fader (1882–1935), French-born Argentine painter
- Julie Fader, Canadian musician, songwriter and visual artist
- Paul T. Fader (1959-2017), American lawyer and politician
- Peter Fader, American academic
