= Foton Grand General G9 =

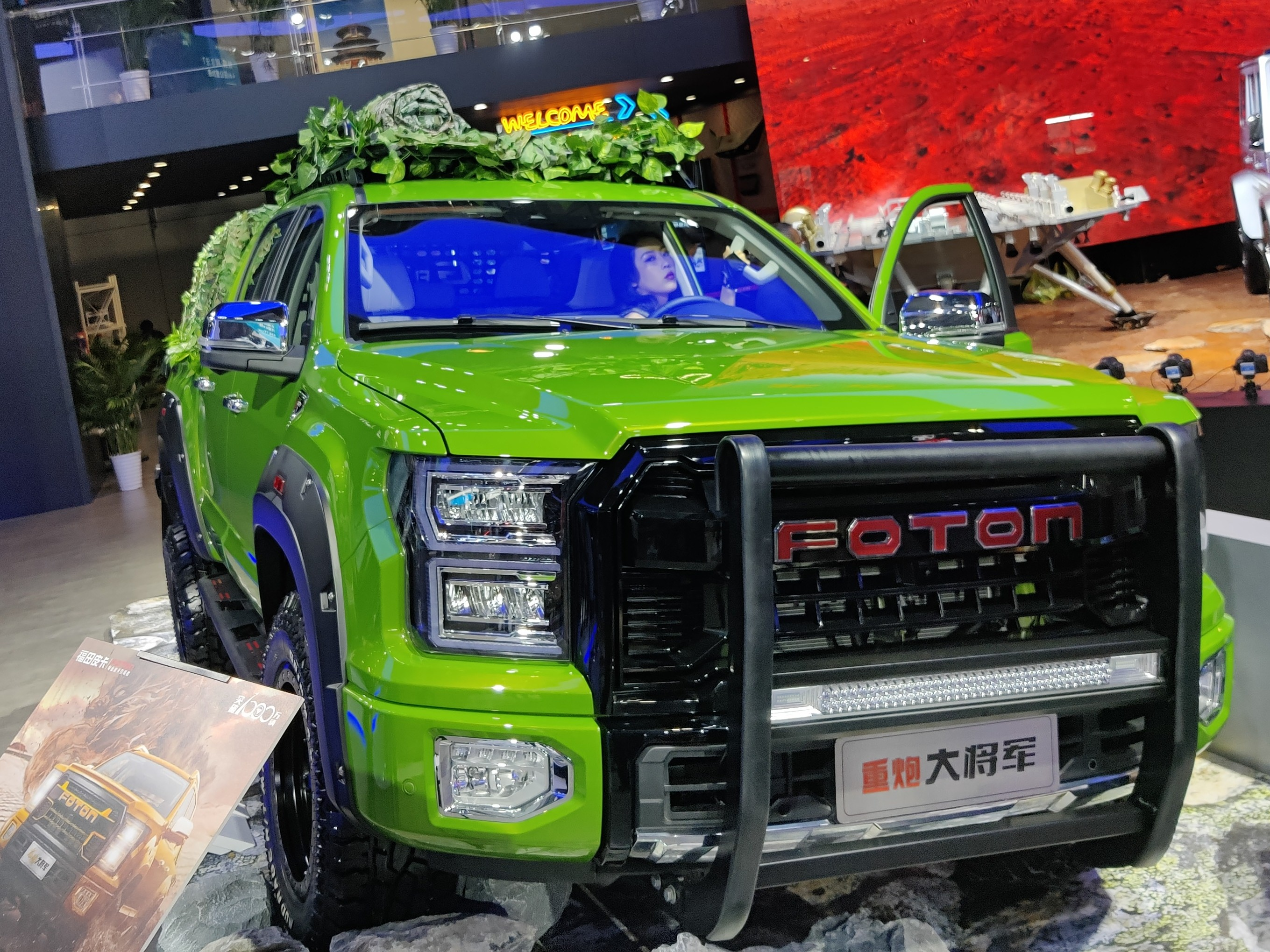

Overview
- Manufacturer: Foton Motor
- Also called: Foton Big General; BAIC Beijing Foton
- Production: 2021
- Assembly: China

Body and chassis
- Class: Mid-size pickup truck
- Body style: Pickup truck
- Layout: AWD
- Doors: 4
- Related: Foton Tunland Yutu

Powertrain
- Engine: 2.0T gasoline, 2.0T diesel, and 2.5T diesel
- Transmission: 8-speed automatic gearbox

Dimensions
- Wheelbase: 3,110–3,400 mm (122.4–133.9 in)
- Length: 5,340–5,630 mm (210.2–221.7 in)
- Width: 1,960–1,980 mm (77.2–78.0 in)
- Height: 1,895–1,905 mm (74.6–75.0 in)

The Foton Grand General G9 (Chinese: 福田 大将军G9), or Foton Dajiangjun G9 in Chinese, is a mid-size pickup truck made by Foton in 2021 and shown at the 2020 Beijing Auto Show originally as the Foton Grand General.

== Overview ==
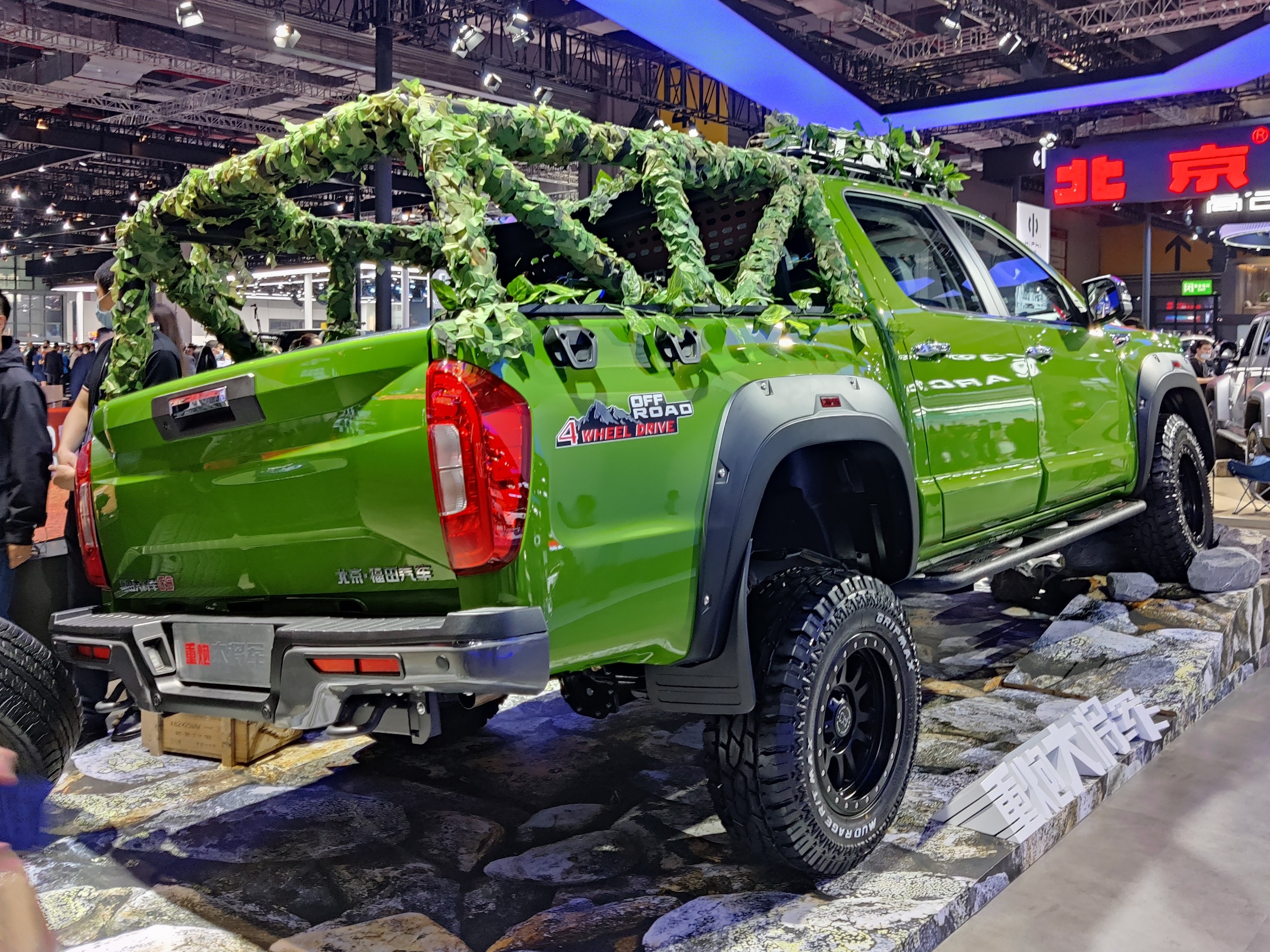
Foton Grand General G9 rear

The Foton Grand General G9 is based on the same platform as the Foton Tunland Yutu pickup series while featuring a different front end. The powertrain of the Grand General G9 has three options, all turbocharged: a 2.0-liter gasoline, 2.0-liter diesel, or a 2.5-liter diesel engine, and an 8-speed automatic gearbox is standard on the gasoline models. Power outputs are 175 kW (238 hp) for the 4G20TI5 gasoline option, while Foton's own 4F20TC diesel develops a maximum power of 120 kW (163 hp), while the larger VM 2.5T Diesel offers 110 kW (150 hp). The lineup started at 129,800 yuan at the time of introduction.

=== Design Controversies ===
The design of the Grand General G9 is controversial as the front fascia heavily resembles that of the Ford F-150 Raptor.

== See also ==
- Ford F150
- Ford F-150 Raptor
