= Fade Out (album) =

Studio album by Loop
- Released: November 1988
- Recorded: August 1988
- Studio: Blackwing Studios
- Genre: Space rock, noise rock, shoegaze
- Length: 41:27
- Label: Head
- Producer: Loop, Paul Kendall

Loop chronology
Heaven's End (1987)	Fade Out (1988)	A Gilded Eternity (1990)

Professional ratings
Review scores
Source	Rating
Allmusic	link
PopMatters	8/10
The Quietus	(positive)

Fade Out is the second album by British alternative rock band Loop. This album was more commercially successful than its predecessor, reaching #1 on the UK Indie Charts and peaking at #51 on the official UK album charts.

== Track listing ==
No.	Title	Length
1.	"Black Sun"	5:12
2.	"This Is Where You End"	4:43
3.	"Fever Knife"	5:10
4.	"Torched"	4:54
5.	"Fade Out"	6:49
6.	"Pulse"	4:47
7.	"A Vision Stain"	4:29
8.	"Got to Get It Over"	5:24
Total length:		41:27

== Charts ==
Year	Chart	Position
1989	UK Indie Chart	1
1989	UK Albums Chart	51
