= Adolphe Féder =

French painter

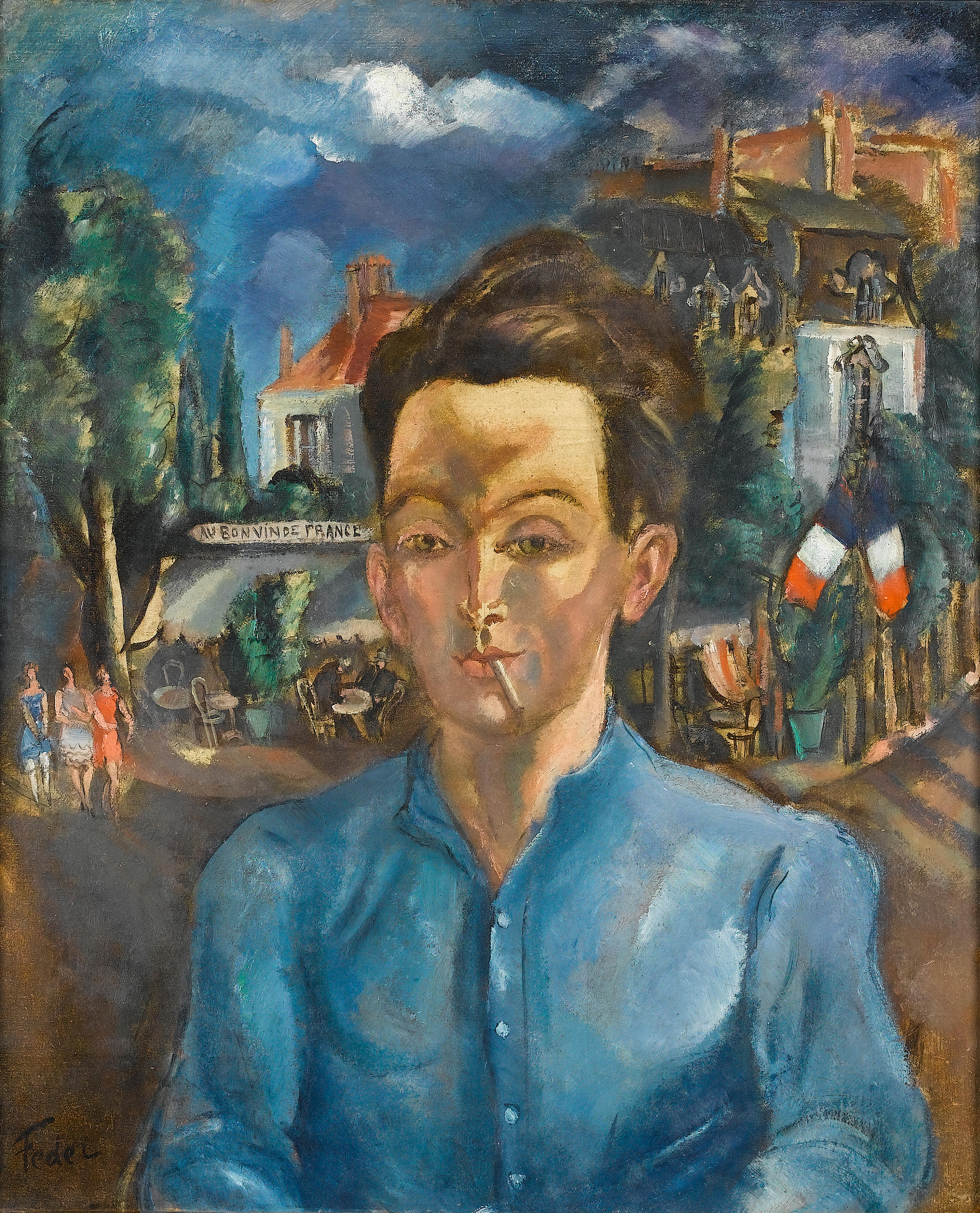
- Au bon vin de France, prior to 1939
- Born: 16 July 1886; Odessa, Russian Empire (present-day Ukraine)
- Died: 13 December 1943 (aged 57); Auschwitz-Birkenau, German-occupied Poland
- Education: Paris Art School
- Known for: Painting, illustrating
- Notable work: Portrait de Lucien Bedstead; Au bon vin de France; Juif à barbe tenant un plateau
- Spouse: Sima Féder
- Media related to Adolphe Feder at Wikimedia Commons

Adolphe Féder (Note: or Aizik Féder or Айзик Федер) (16 July 1886 – 13 December 1943) was a Jewish-Ukrainian painter and illustrator. He moved to France in 1908, where he remained until his deportation and subsequent murder at the hands of the Vichy regime. Féder is best-known today for the artwork he produced of those interned with him in the Drancy internment camp.

== Life ==
=== Early life and education ===
Born to Jewish-Ukrainian merchant parents, in 1905 Féder found himself involved in the revolutionary Bund Labor Movement. His involvement in the organization would force him to flee to Berlin at the age of 19.

Following his time in Berlin, Féder moved to Geneva before moving to Paris in 1908 to study at the Académie Julian. At the Académie he studied painting and worked closely with the French Impressionist, Henri Matisse in his workshop.

=== Visit to Palestine ===
In 1926, Féder made a trip to Palestine. On his trip, he encountered many Judaic elements, which he painted. The trip's impact on him yielded many of his most notable paintings, such as "Juif à barbe tenant un plateau" ("Bearded Jew holding a tray"). When Féder returned to Paris, he brought many of these paintings back with him, which garnered him recognition in the Parisian artistic community.

=== Internment and death ===
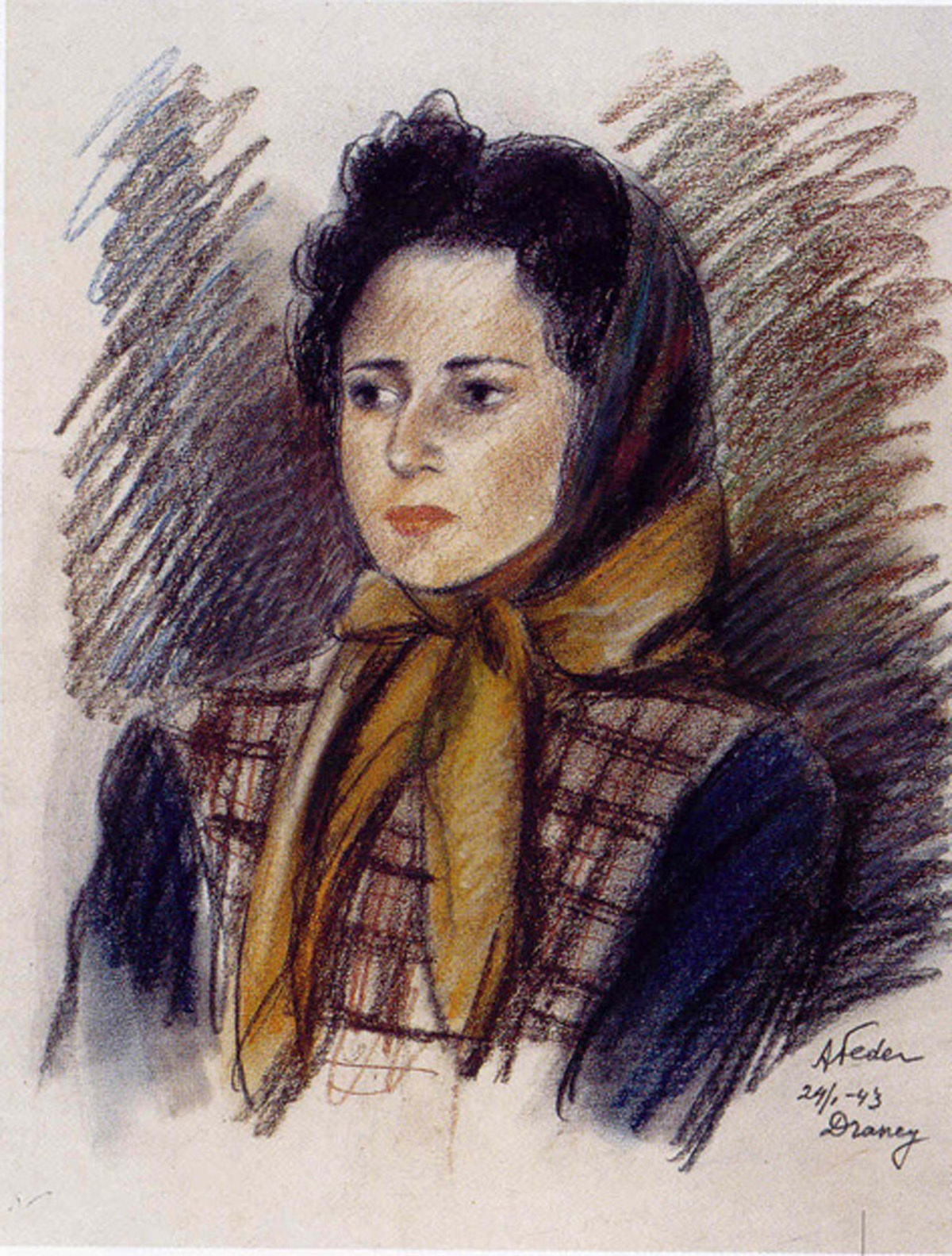
Before Féder was sent to Auschwitz he painted prisoners and guards in the Drancy internment camp.

When Nazi troops marched across France in 1942, Féder, aged 52, tried to get in contact with the French Resistance but was caught by the Pétain militia. He and his wife were arrested on 10 June 1942 and imprisoned in Cherche-Midi prison; he was transferred to the Drancy internment camp in September 1942.

In Drancy, Féder continued to paint, creating portraits of those around him, such as the other prisoners and guards. His paintings stopped with his deportation to the Auschwitz concentration camp on 13 December 1943 where he was murdered. Féder's wife, Sima Féder, donated Féder's works from inside Drancy to the Ghetto Fighters' House upon her death in 1967.

== Career ==
Féder's success came in 1912 when his landscape works were displayed at the Salon d'Automne. He continued to paint following this, including a series of 45 illustrations created for a book of poetry by French poet Arthur Rimbaud. The book received a limited run of 350 copies in 1924, but was commended for its watercolor illustrations.

When Féder's work appeared in the Fearon Galleries in 1923, his work received great praise. An art critic, writing on Féder's work, said "Adolphe Féder struck me as the most original in his finely austere 'Joueur de Biniou' and more mirthful still life." A monograph on Féder was written in 1929 by Gustave Kahn.
