= Heaven's End =

Studio album by Loop
- Released: 20 November 1987
- Recorded: August–September 1987
- Studio: The House in the Woods, Bletchingley, Surrey, England
- Genre: Space rock, psychedelic rock, shoegaze
- Length: 37:33
- Label: Head
- Producer: Loop

Loop chronology
Heaven's End (1987)	Fade Out (1988)

Professional ratings
Review scores
Source	Rating
AllMusic	4.5/5 stars
New Musical Express	8/10
PopMatters	7/10
The Quietus	(positive)

Heaven's End is the debut album by British alternative rock band Loop. It was released in 1987 by Head Records and peaked at #4 in the UK Indie Charts.

== Track listing ==
No.	Title	Length
1.	"Soundhead"	4:59
2.	"Straight to Your Heart"	6:16
3.	"Forever"	4:46
4.	"Heaven's End"	4:11
5.	"Too Real to Feel"	5:17
6.	"Fix to Fall"	4:28
7.	"Head On"	2:43
8.	"Carry Me"	4:57
Total length:		37:33

== Charts ==
Year	Chart	Position
1987	UK Indie Chart	4
