= Ed Feder =

Australian rules footballer

Personal information
- Full name: Edward Feder
- Born: 12 September 1896
- Died: 12 November 1968 (aged 72)
- Original team: Kaniva

Playing career^{1}
Years	Club	Games (Goals)
1921	Geelong	2 (0)
- ^{1} Playing statistics correct to the end of 1921.

Ed Feder (12 September 1896 – 12 November 1968) was an Australian rules footballer who played with Geelong in the Victorian Football League (VFL).
