= Fade in =

Fade in may refer to:

- Dissolve (filmmaking), a type of transition used in visual media
- Fade (audio engineering), a similar type of transition used in audio media
- Fade In (magazine), an online film magazine
- Fade In (film), 1968 film
- Fade In, an unpublished non-fiction book by Michael Piller about Star Trek: Insurrection
- Fade In (software), professional screenwriting software
- "Fade In" (The Offer), a 2022 television episode

== See also ==
- "Fade Out/In", a song by Paloalto
- "Fade Out, Fade In", an episode of M*A*S*H
- Fade Out - Fade In, a Broadway musical
- Fade (disambiguation)
- Fade out (disambiguation)
