= Fadeout (novel) =

1970 novel by Joseph Hansen

- First ed. cover
- Author: Joseph Hansen
- Language: English
- Series: Dave Brandstetter mysteries
- Genre: Mystery fiction, detective fiction
- Publisher: Harper & Row
- Publication date: 1970 (first edition)
- Publication place: United States
- Media type: Print
- Pages: 187 p.
- OCLC: 103230

Fadeout is a hardboiled mystery novel by American crime writer Joseph Hansen, and the first to feature his popular character Dave Brandstetter, an openly gay detective. The novel was first published by Harper & Row in 1970, and was reissued by University of Wisconsin Press in 2004 with an introduction from Hansen. In 2022, the book was again republished by Soho Syndicate, a division of Penguin Random House, with a new introduction by Michael Nava.

In 2018, screenwriting duo Christopher Markus and Stephen McFeely optioned film and television rights to the entire Brandstetter series. In early 2025, Markus alluded that he was working alone on the project, which had been optioned by Netflix as a pilot.

== Synopsis ==
Beloved pop star Fox Olson is assumed to have died when his car is found destroyed beneath a narrow wooden bridge. However, without the sign of a body, no-nonsense insurance investigator Dave Brandstetter believes otherwise, and soon finds evidence that indicates he is right. For instance, what lies behind the seemingly innocent friendship between Fox's wife and his manager? And just why has an old boyhood friend of his suddenly shown up after twenty years?

== Reception ==
Unusual in two respects. One is that the insurance investigator, though ruggedly masculine, is thoroughly and contentedly homosexual. The other is that Mr. Hansen is an excellent craftsman, a compelling writer. - New Yorker

The most exciting and effective writer of the classic private-eye novel working today. - Los Angeles Times

Another classic private-eye novel: detailedly vivid . . . tenderly erotic. - The Times

A masterly portrayal of loneliness and sexual obsession. Hansen's writing is sharp and economical. He has an eye for the exactly relevant detail. - Gay News
