= Faded =

Faded may refer to:

- Faded (EP), by Flagship, or the title song, 2015
- "Faded" (Alan Walker song), 2015
- "Faded" (Kate DeAraugo song), 2005; covered by Cascada, 2008
- "Faded" (soulDecision song), 1999
- "Faded" (Tyga song), 2012
- "Faded" (Zhu song), 2014
- "Faded", a song by Ben Harper from The Will to Live, 1997
- "Faded", a song by Jackson Wang from Mirrors, 2019
- "Faded", a song by Kim Petras, 2017
- "Faded", a song by Lizzo from Lizzobangers, 2013
- "Faded", a song by Mariah Carey from Me. I Am Mariah... The Elusive Chanteuse, 2014

== See also ==
- Fade (disambiguation)
