= Jo in Nine G Hell =

Studio album by The Hair and Skin Trading Company
- Released: December 1992
- Recorded: 1992
- Genre: Noise rock
- Length: 48:19
- Label: Situation Two/Beggars Banquet Records
- Producer: Roli Mosimann

The Hair and Skin Trading Company chronology
Jo in Nine G Hell (1992)	Over Valence (1993)

Professional ratings
Review scores
Source	Rating
AllMusic	link

Jo in Nine G Hell is the debut album by the Hair and Skin Trading Company, released in 1992. It is the last album released by the Situation Two offshoot of Beggars Banquet Records. The album's title is an anagram of the remaining three member's names (Neil, Nigel, John) following the departure of 4th member Richard Johnston during the recording.

== Track listing ==
1. "Elevenate"
2. "Flat Truck"
3. "Torque"
4. "Monkies"
5. "Kak"
6. "Where's Gala"
7. "Ground Zero"
8. "$1000 Pledge"
9. "The Final Nail"
10. "Pipeline"

== Personnel ==
- Neil Mackay – vocals, bass guitar
- Nigel Webb – guitar
- John Wills – drums
- Richard Johnston - samplers on tracks 5, 9, 10
