= Fade (video game) =

2001 video game

- Virtual box art for Fade.
- Developer: Fade Team
- Designer: Alexandre Leboucher
- Platforms: Windows Mobile (ARM, MIPS, SH3), iOS
- Release: 2001 (Windows Mobile), 2008 (iPhone/iPad)
- Genre: Adventure
- Mode: Single player

Fade, also known as 1112, is an adventure game originally developed by the Fade Team and released for the Windows Mobile Professional platform in 2001. It was broken up into chapters and renamed 1112 when released for the iOS, on November 24, 2008. In September 2019, the studio announced the cancellation of the final episodic entry of the series due to their shift in focus on VR games.

The game was critically acclaimed as the first large-scale adventure game for the Windows Mobile platform. It has been compared to Myst, the first immersive graphic adventure games for the PC, and the games in the Zork series.

The game was originally created in French, and was translated into English. The game's story has been compared to a similarly themed film, Memento.

== Plot synopsis ==
=== Summary ===
Fade takes place in present-day France, and the player steps into the shoes of Louis, a married Frenchman suffering from amnesia since childhood. Throughout the game, he will explore various locations and will slowly discover the truth behind the mysterious blackouts that he occasionally has.

=== Expanded overview ===
Louis' wife, Anne.

The story starts out as the player takes control of Louis Everett, a French art dealer, as he wakes up in his home. The player is also introduced to Anne, Louis' wife, who is taking a shower at the time. Early in the story, the player learns that Louis suffers from random blackouts, and that he often has unusual dreams during those blackouts. Because of this, Louis takes medication.

The player soon receives a call from Félicienne, Louis' assistant at the antique shop he owns, regarding his latest client, one Mr. Belleville. Apparently, a file about a deal with Mr. Belleville was sent to Louis, which he promptly finds in his mailbox. Louis then heads to his shop in a village called Saint Jeoire via his automobile. His wife tags along for the ride, and player is presented with an opportunity to talk to Anne along the way.

Upon arriving at the village, Louis finds Félicienne in the process of changing a broken light bulb. He helps her, yet gets rid of her after by lighting a cigarette, which she abhors. A few moments later, in his office, the player is alerted that Mr. Belleville has arrived at the shop. This apparently is the first time that Louis is to meet his client as all their previous meetings have been over the telephone. Right before meeting Mr. Belleville, Louis succumbs to a blackout.

The player regains control of Louis, now in an unknown hotel in Paris. He has no recollection of how he had arrived, and no memory of what he was doing there in the first place. Louis finds his way downstairs and is directed by the hotel's receptionist to a bar across the street.

The bar in Paris.

At the bar, Louis discovers that he has left his wallet in his room and goes back for it. Along the way, it is found that the receptionist is not at the lobby desk. A newspaper he was reading however, is on the desk, which the player may read. In the newspaper, there is a certain article about a serial killer in an area called 'Robertville sur Angeais'. It is also learned that all the killers' victims had their hearts removed with complete surgical precision. Louis then proceeds to his room, but is blocked by a chambermaid who does not want him to pass. He bypasses her by convincing a man he had met earlier in the bar to propose to the chambermaid.

After taking his wallet from his room, Louis goes back to the bar for a cup of coffee. He is directed by another man to the train station in the town, and Louis buys a ticket for 'Robertville sur Angeais'. After a long wait for the ticket, the player finally boards the train, where Louis meets a beautiful woman in his cab. Not long after, the player is treated to another one of Louis' blackouts.

Once again, the player finds that Louis has switched locations again before awakening from his last blackout. This time, Louis finds out that he is in the house of Jean, a friend of his. Louis talks to Jean for a while, about some seeming trouble with Anne. Louis walks to his house, discovers a strange occult symbol painted on his mailbox, and finds that Anne is not there. Apparently, the house does not have any electricity, so the player is forced to find a flashlight in order to restore power to the house. Louis runs over to Jean's place to find it empty. He uses a fuse he finds in Jean's house (after repairing it) to restore power to his house and almost immediately, the phone rings. Upon answering it, only a faint, buzzing sound can be heard. Louis decides to ask around the neighborhood.

Surprisingly, as the player moves from neighbor to neighbor, it is apparent that the neighbors believe that Anne was a battered wife. Louis flees the neighborhood to the bus stop, then to Saint Jeoire. It is still night when he arrives to discover his shop ransacked, with Felicienne sobbing in the back. After going back and forth in the town, the player finds Louis in the house of a friend of his wife, Astrid. She gives Louis the key to the dairy that Anne apparently owns and he promptly heads there. Breaking into the cash register, he finds a tape recorder inside, which he listens to. There appears to be a conversation between Anne and an unknown man on the tape, but the vocals aren't clear. Louis then uses a camera to take pictures of his vandalized mailbox and globe, and uses the tape recorder to record the sound emanating from his phone. But when he plays the tape again, he finds himself falling into another blackout.

Louis regains consciousness to find himself sitting on a fountain. After a few minutes of inquisitive exploration, the player finds out that Louis is now committed in a mental asylum. He is forcefully confined to his cell after an altercation with the receptionist, where he spends the night until breakfast the next day. In a scene reminiscent of the movie One Flew Over the Cuckoo's Nest, the player is given the chance to converse (rather uselessly) with the mental patients. After more exploration (and an encounter with Zampano, the asylum's beefy tough guy) and interaction with the asylum's colorful residents, Louis is taken to the "doctor". He is interviewed and thrown back in his cell, where he formulates an escape plan. Louis starts a fire in one of the huts to create a distraction, which he uses to attempt an escape, but he is caught. Waking up in a heavily padded isolation cell, Louis finds the door unlocked. He eventually makes his way to a cavern where he witnesses a ritual involving his wife as a human sacrifice. Afterwards, he blacks out again.

Once again, Louis wakes up in his house, similar to the beginning of the game. Anne, once more, is not in the house. The phone then rings and Louis learns from the police that they have found Anne. To his horror, Louis finds that the police have actually discovered Anne's naked body in some woods near their home. There is some confusion, as Louis asserts that the body is his wife's, but not the girl's face. Eventually, the player finds clues that Anne is alive and well in Louis' mother's apartment in Paris.

In Paris, Louis finds himself in the apartment that he grew up in. The player is given the chance to explore around the house. In one of the bathrooms, it is discovered that Anne was growing some marijuana in the bathtub. He finds a notebook with names and telephone numbers of many people, including one Gisele Montfort, who he calls. She hangs up, but Louis decides to talk to her in person and heads to her house.

At Gisele's, Louis learns that his wife had been to a swingers' bar in town a few days before. He goes to the bar, accompanied by his assistant (who apparently had come along), and meets a girl named Christine. After some more exploration, the player ends up trying to break into Belleville's house. He takes several documents from the garage and heads back to his mother's house. The phone rings again and Louis is invited over by a man named Alex. Unfortunately, upon reaching Alex's place, the player discovers that the former had somehow hanged himself.

On the way to the Isle of the Dead.

== Reception ==
The game was a finalist in Pocket PC Magazine's Best Software Awards in 2005, along with other renowned titles such as Myst (for Pocket PC) and Scrabble.

The game was praised for the depth, addictiveness and uniqueness of its story and its highly detailed graphics, which were very advanced compared to other Pocket PC games of the time. In fact, it is regarded as one of the most beautifully rendered games for the Pocket PC.

Over the years, Fade has garnered numerous awards and recognition from many notable news sites focusing on mobile software. Fade was awarded five out of five stars by Mobile Tech Review in 2003. In 2004, years after its release, Fade was included as one of the "must-have games for the Pocket PC" in an article on Pocket PC Thoughts.

When it was released on iPhone and iPad it won "Best Euro Indie Award" at the Dutch Game Awards 2011, and well reviewed. It received 4.5/5 from 148apps.com, 8/10 from pocketgamer.co.uk, 9/10 from iphoniacs.fr, 8/10 from touchgamers.de, and 4/5 from iphonegamenetwork.com.
