= Fade (lighting) =

Gradual change in the intensity of stage lights

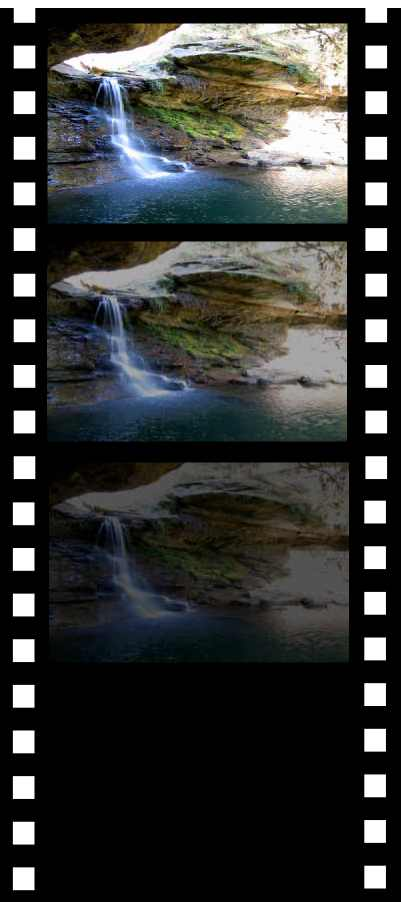
An example of a fade out in film

In stage lighting, a fade is a gradual increase or decrease of the intensity of light projected onto the stage. The term fade-in refers to gradually changing the lighting level from complete darkness to a predetermined lighting level. A fade-out (also known as fade-to-black) refers to gradually decreasing the intensity of light until none is shining on the stage. A crossfade is when lighting levels are gradually altered from one setting to another. A fade-in is sometimes called a build, and where this terminology is used, a fade is understood to be a fade-out.

Increasing lighting intensities that are not black is referred to as a fade-up. Similarly, decreasing lighting intensities to a level above black is referred to as a fade-down.

Cross-fades are accomplished by executing fade-ups and/or fade-downs. In nearly all theatrical lighting designs, multiple lighting instruments are used to illuminate the stage at any one time. A cue refers to the recorded state of illumination for the entire stage at that time. The intensity of the lighting instruments is often altered with a single crossfade, altering the lighting state of the stage.

The lighting instruments are altered from a dimmer board or lighting control panel operated by a lighting technician. The dimmer board, now referred to as the lighting console, especially with newer digital control systems like DMX, uses a serial data stream to control multiple groups called "universes" of 512 DMX addresses to control compatible fixtures including dimmers, via different methods leading to a single twisted pair of wires connected to the fixtures. DMX consoles are largely computerized, thus allowing digital process control from multiple input devices, and synchronization via MIDI, SMPTE etc.

The terms fade in, fade out, and fade to black were borrowed by Hollywood, and are used in the formal structure of screenplays.
