= Foton MP-X =

Chinese automobile

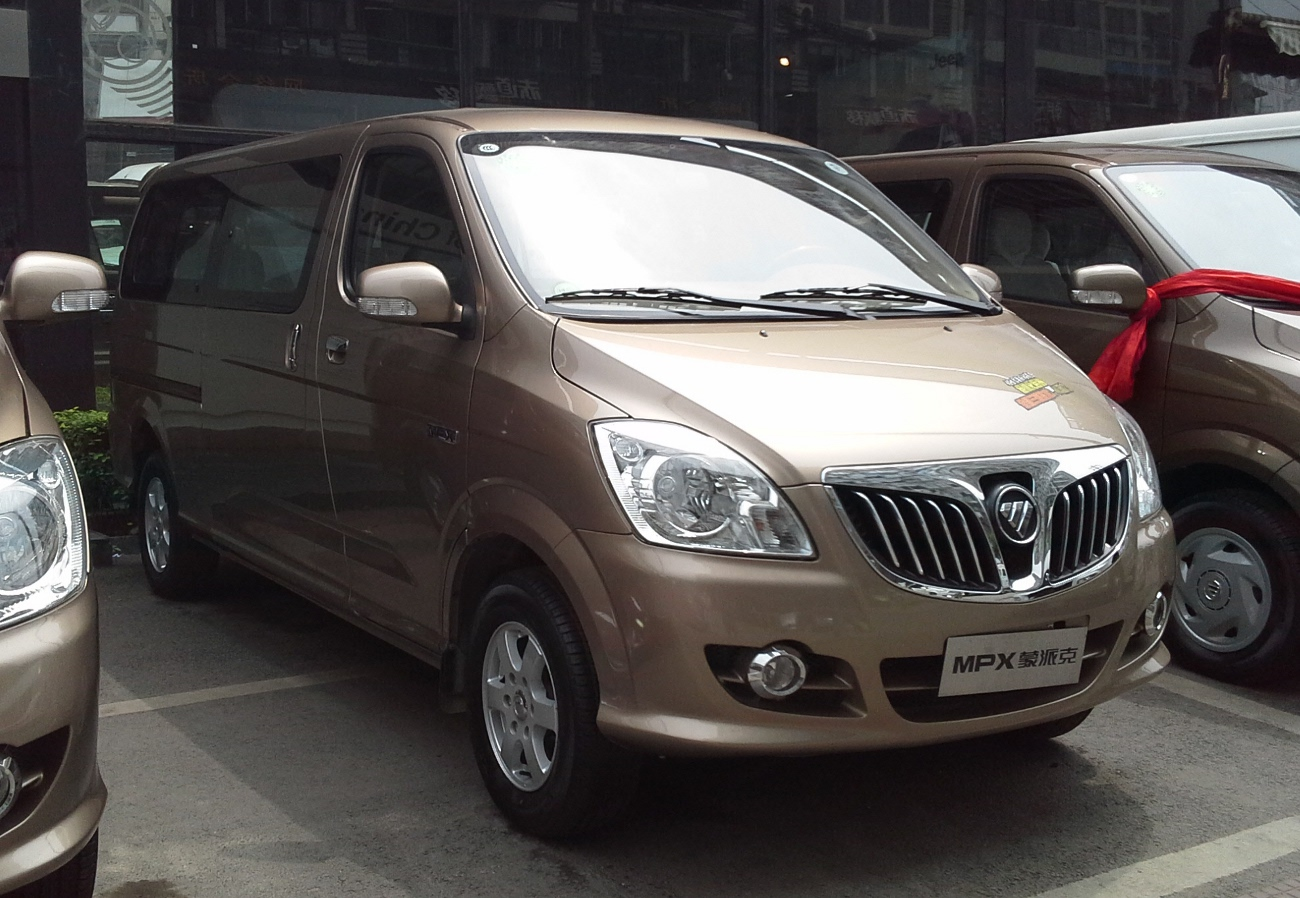

Overview
- Also called: Foton MP-X (蒙派克); Foton MP-X E (蒙派克E); Foton View G5; Foton Scenery G5; Foton Landscape G5
- Production: 2007–present
- Assembly: Changping District, Beijing (Foton)

Body and chassis
- Body style: 4-door van
- Layout: Front-engine, rear-wheel-drive

Powertrain
- Engine: 2.8 L I4 (petrol); 2.4 L I4 (petrol); 2.0 L I4 (petrol)
- Transmission: 5-speed manual

Dimensions
- Wheelbase: 2,985–3,430 mm (117.5–135.0 in)
- Length: 4,800–5,245 mm (189.0–206.5 in)
- Width: 1,825 mm (71.9 in)
- Height: 2,030 mm (79.9 in)

The Foton MP-X is a light commercial van that can seat up to 12 occupants produced by the Chinese automobile manufacturer Foton. The MP-X was sold throughout China and southeast Asian countries including the Philippines and Singapore.

== Overview ==
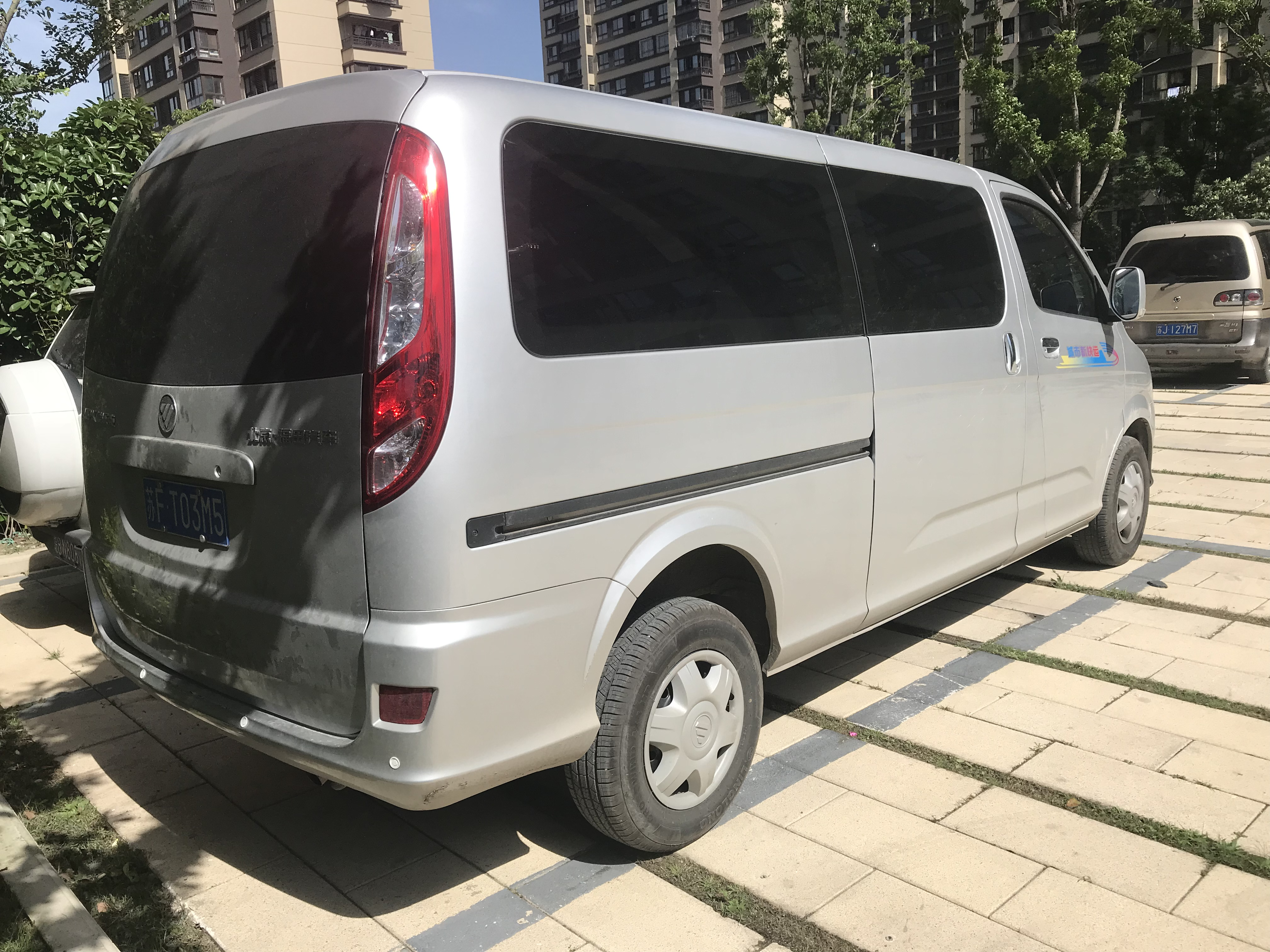
Foton MP-X rear

In 2012, the Foton MP-X was reported to be powered by an inline-four, 2.8-liter turbo diesel that producing 96 kW (129 hp) and 280 N⋅m (207 lb⋅ft) of torque with prices ranging from 99,000 yuan.

As of October 2018, prices of the Foton MP-X ranges from 74,650 to 98,550 yuan.

A different model called the MP-X S was also offered by Foton but was later renamed to Foton View G9.

=== Foton View G5 ===
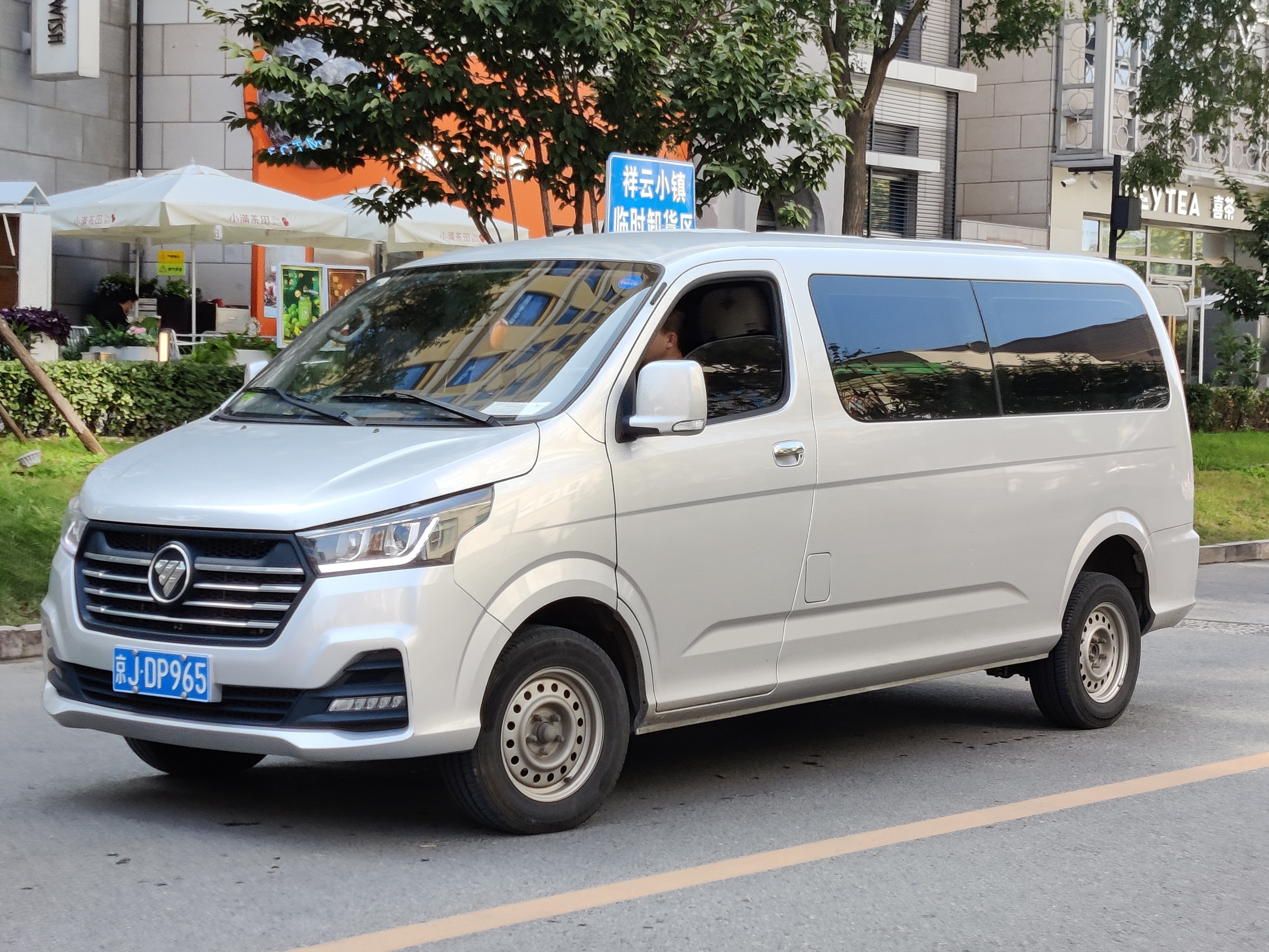
Foton View G5 2020MY

An updated variant succeeding the MP-X E called the Foton View G5 was launched in 2018 while styling remains unchanged from the MP-X. The updated model features powertrains that fulfills the National VI Emissions Standards. The View G5 is powered by a 2.0-liter engine developing 101 kW (136 hp) and 185 N⋅m (136 lb⋅ft) mated to a 5-speed manual transmission.

A facelift was unveiled for the 2020 model year Foton View G5 completely changing the front end. The updated model is powered by a 2.0-liter naturally aspirated engine and a 2.4 liter-naturally aspirated engine developing 101 kW (136 hp) and 120 kW (160 hp) respectively. The transmission is a 5-speed manual gearbox.
