= Foton View =

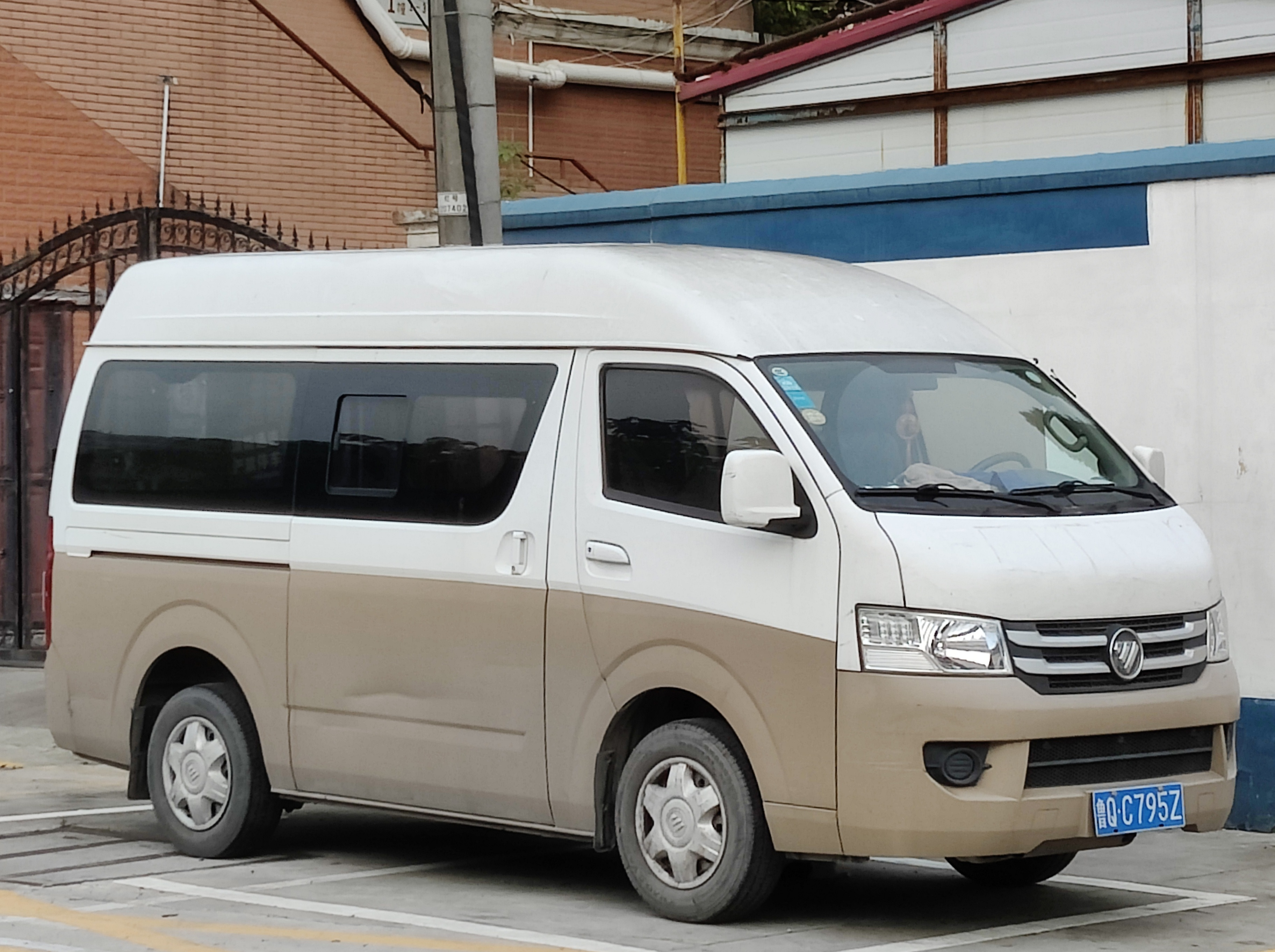

Overview
- Manufacturer: Foton
- Production: 2000–present

Body and chassis
- Class: Light commercial vehicle; Minivan
- Body style: Van; Minibus

The Foton View (Chinese: 福田风景) is a series of light commercial van produced by the Chinese automobile manufacturer Foton. First launched in 2000, the Foton View has since been available in a wide range of body configurations, including a minivan/MPV, minibus, panel van, crew van, and an ambulance.

== First generation: (Alpha; 2000) ==
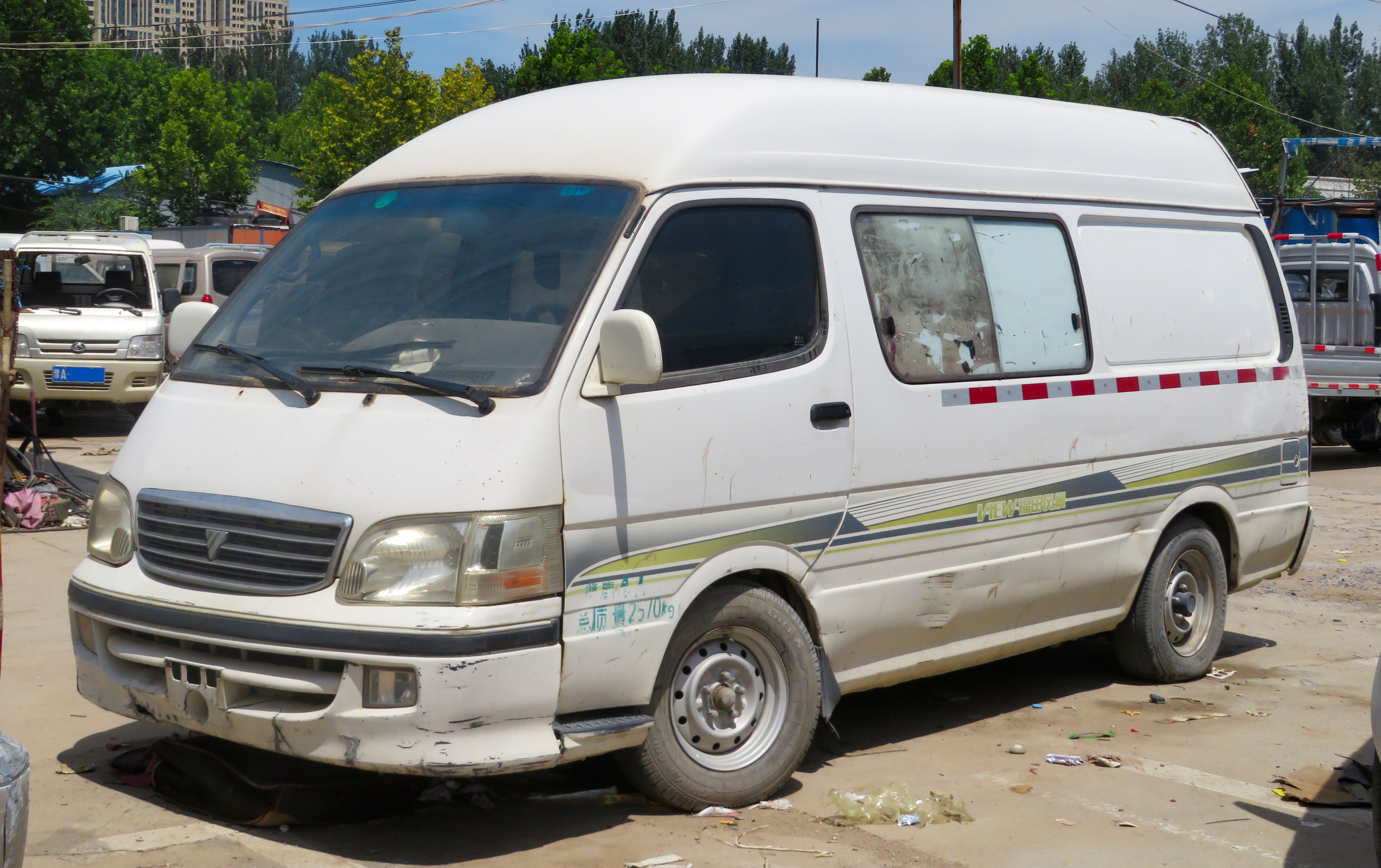
Early Beiqi-Foton View, front quarter view

Originally launched in 2000, the early models of the Foton View heavily resemble the Toyota HiAce H100 vans. An updated model called the Foton View Alpha or Foton View Irland Act was launched to replace the original View models in October 2003.

== Second generation: (Kuaiyun/Kuaijie/Kuaike; 2007) ==
Foton View Kuaiyun
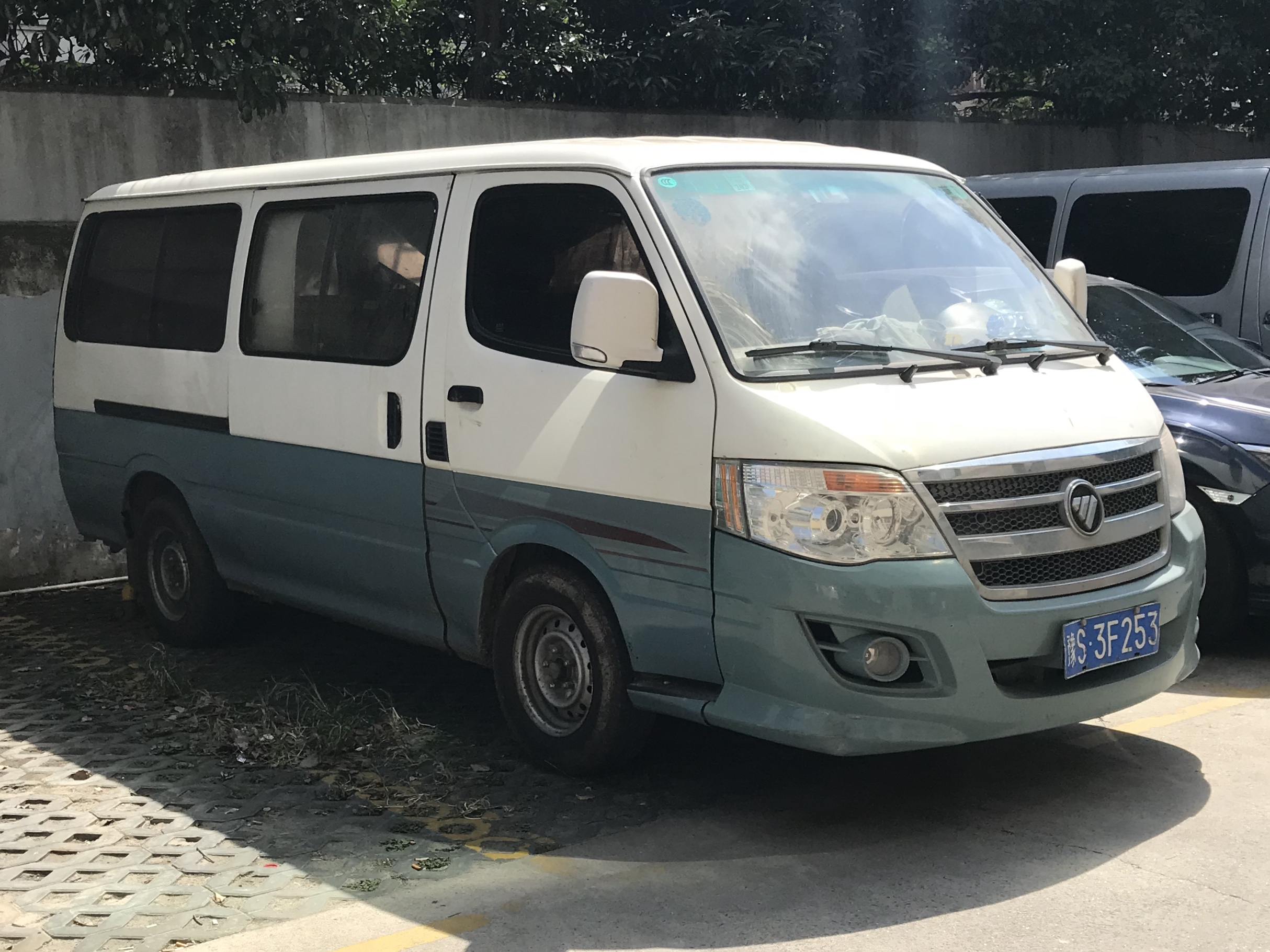

Overview
- Also called: Foton View Kuaiyun; Foton View Kuaijie; Foton View Kuaike (Discontinued); Foton View C2 (Malaysia)
- Production: 2007–2014
- Assembly: China: Anhui; Malaysia: Kulim, Kedah (Inokom Corporation plant); Philippines: Clark, Pampanga

Body and chassis
- Body style: 3-door van/minibus; 4-door van/minibus; 5-door van/minibus
- Layout: Front-engine, rear-wheel-drive / four-wheel drive

Powertrain
- Engine: 2.0 L BJ486-VVT I4; 2.2 L BJ491EQ4 I4; 2.0 L 4Di diesel I4; 2.5 L 4J25TC TDi turbo-diesel I4; 2.8 L 4JB1 TDi turbo-diesel I4
- Transmission: 5-speed manual

Dimensions
- Wheelbase: Regular: 2,590 mm (102.0 in); Extended: 2,890 mm (113.8 in)
- Length: Regular: 5,020 mm (197.6 in); Extended: 5,320 mm (209.4 in)
- Width: 1,690 mm (66.5 in)
- Height: Regular: 1,935 mm (76.2 in); Extended: 2,050 mm (80.7 in); Roof extension: 2,225 mm (87.6 in)

The Foton View Kuaiyun (快运), Foton View Kuaijie (快捷), and Foton View Kuaike (快客) was released by Foton in 2007. Originally the Kuaiyun was a cheaper trim for cargo while the Kuaike was built as a more premium trim for passengers. However the Kuaike trim was discontinued shortly due to low sales, and the Kuaijie was created as an even cheaper trim. The Kuaiyun and Kuaijie models are different trim levels featuring different front fascia designs.

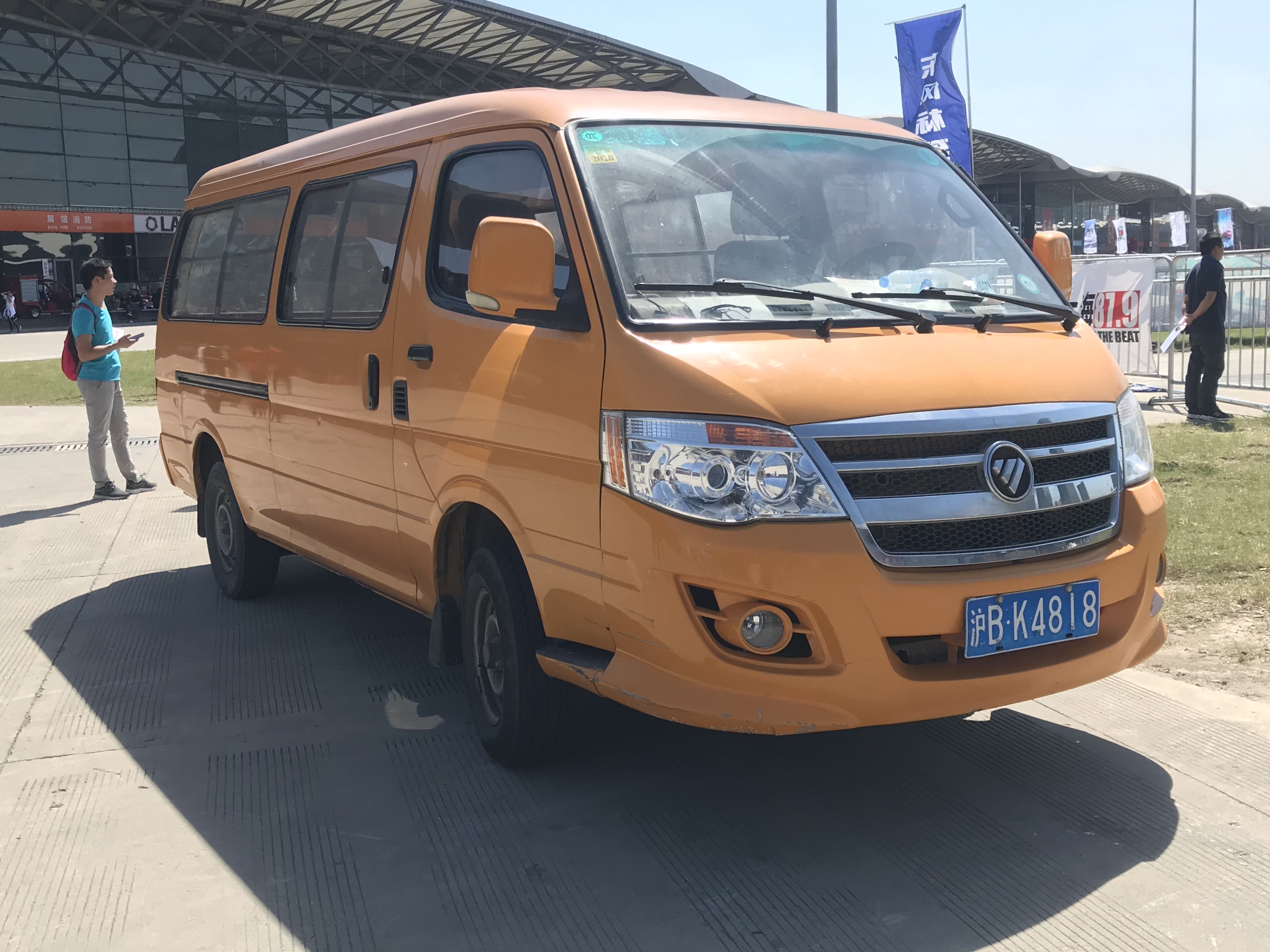
Foton View Kuaiyun

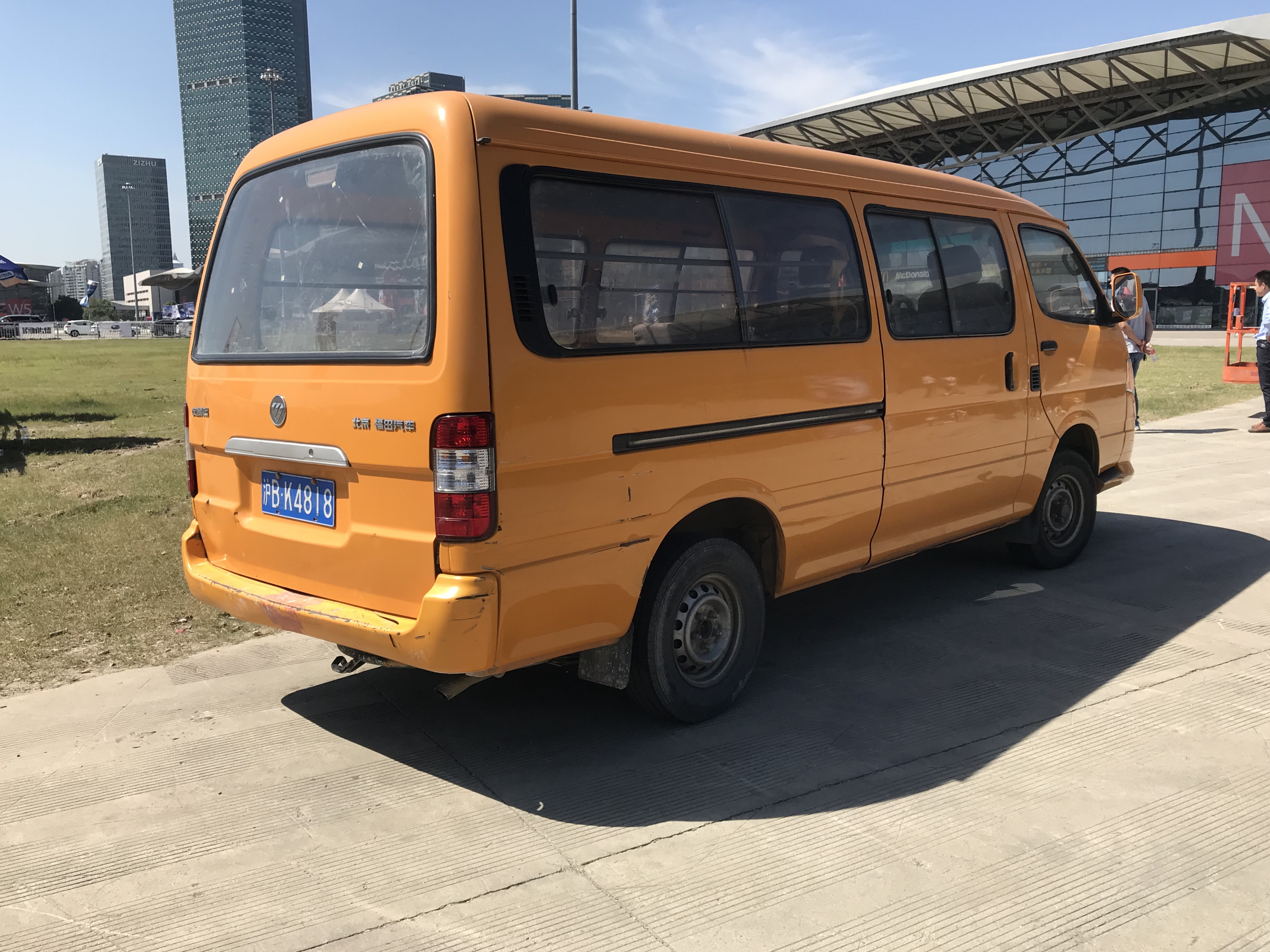
Foton View Kuaiyun rear

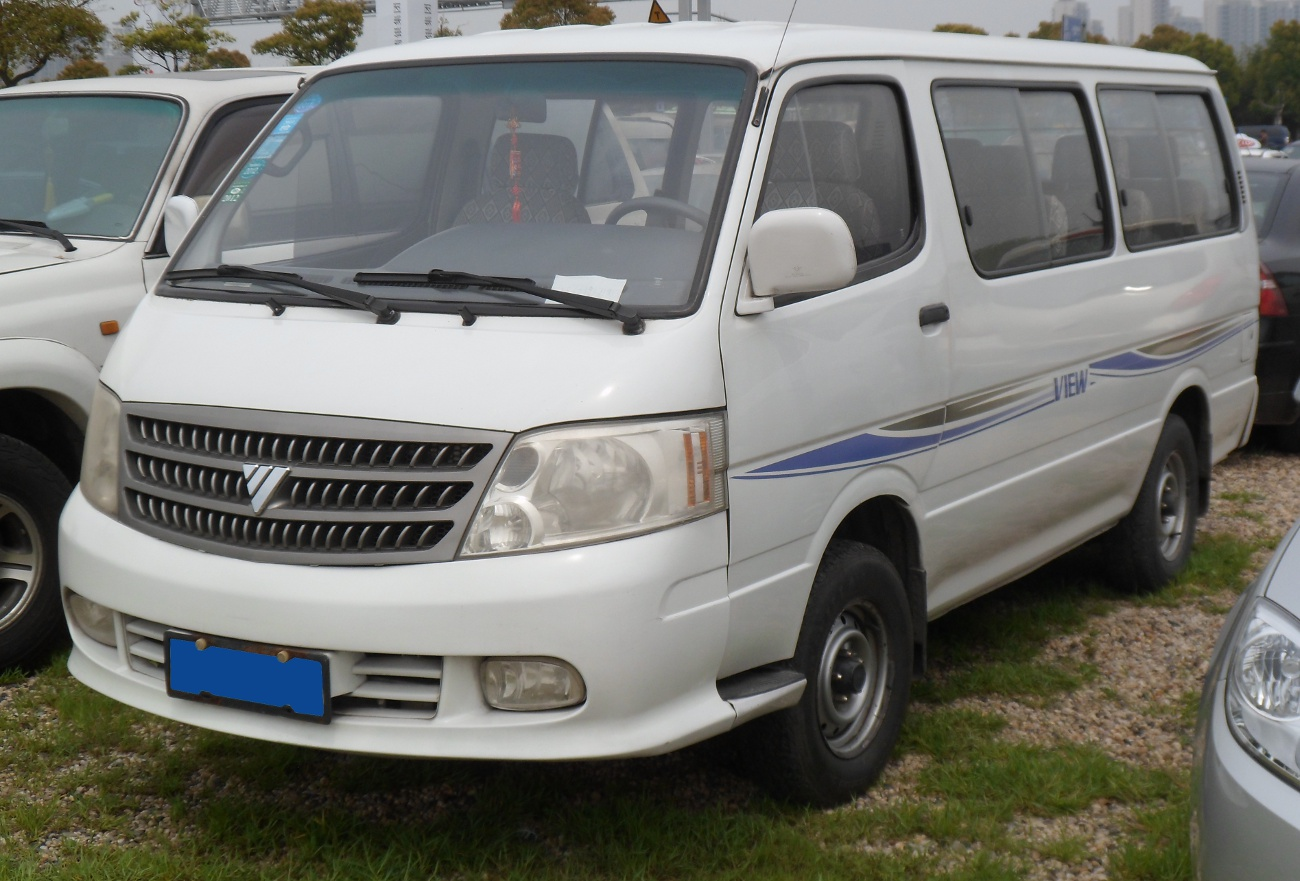
Original Foton View Kuaijie

Engine options of the Foton View Kuaiyun and Foton View Kuaijie includes a 2.0-liter gasoline engine, 2.2-liter gasoline engine, 2.2-liter diesel engine, 2.5-liter diesel engine and a 2.8-liter diesel engine mated to a 5-speed manual transmission.

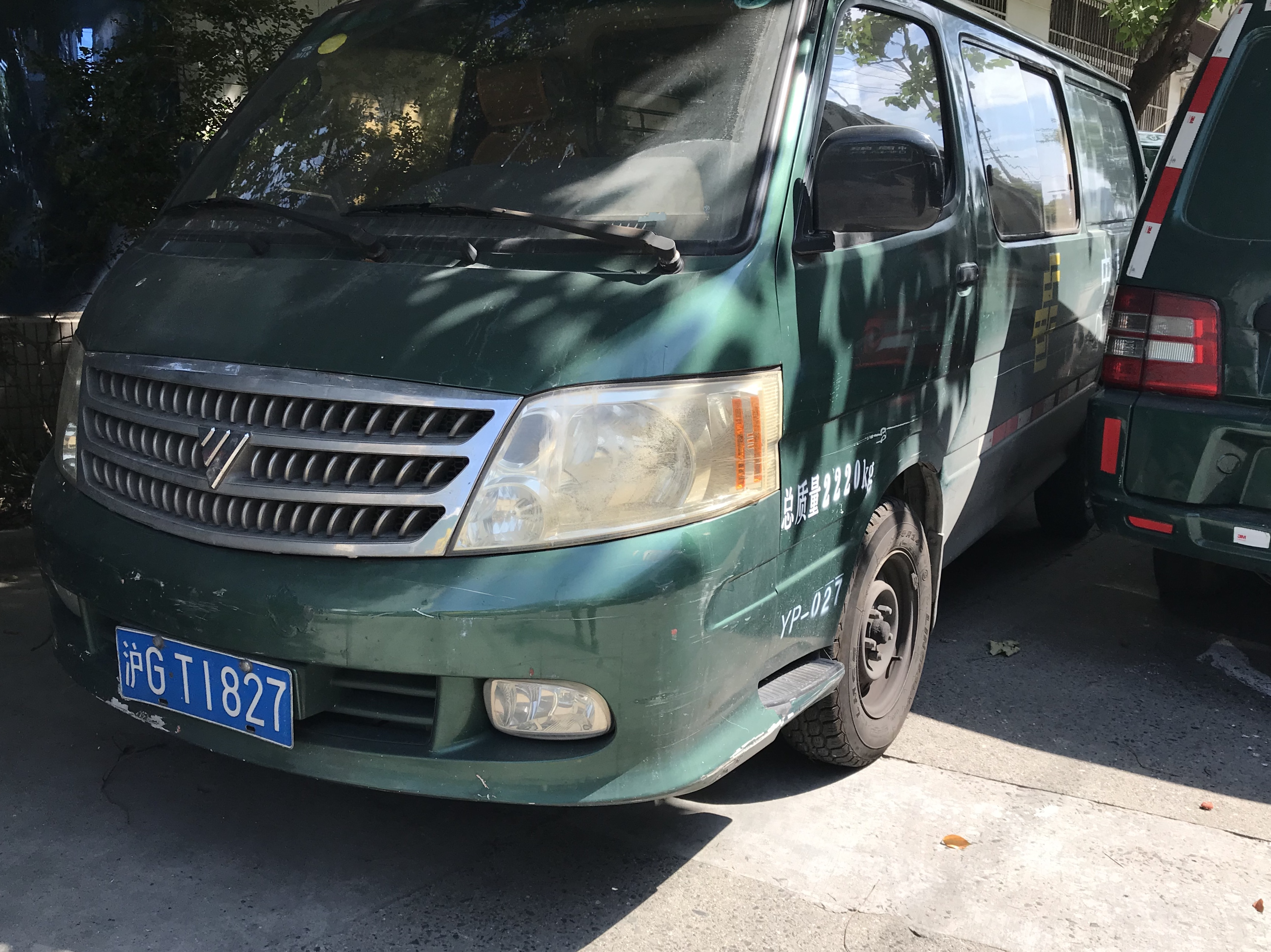
Foton View Kuaike panel van front

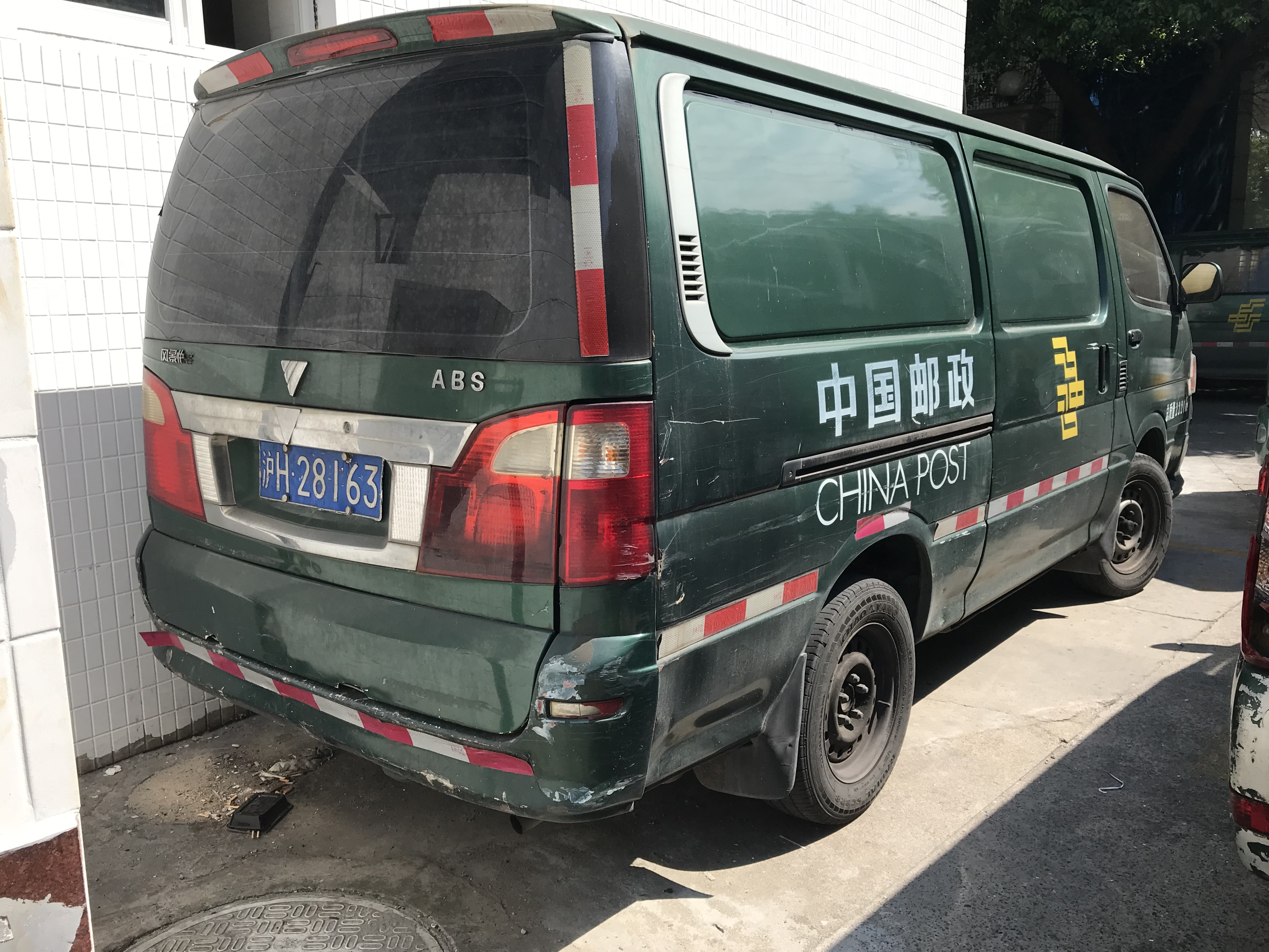
Foton View Kuaike panel van rear
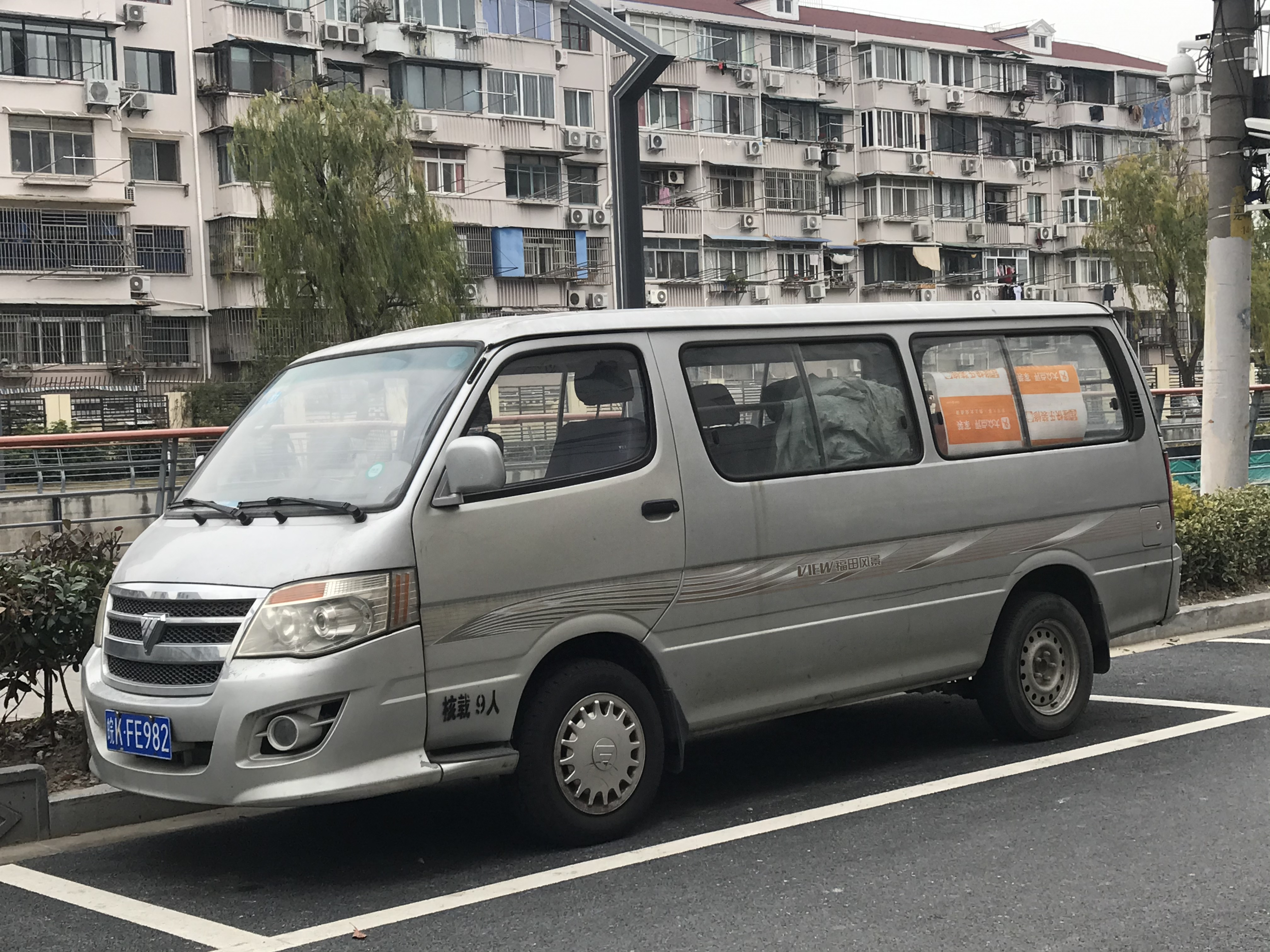
Foton View Kuaijie facelift front

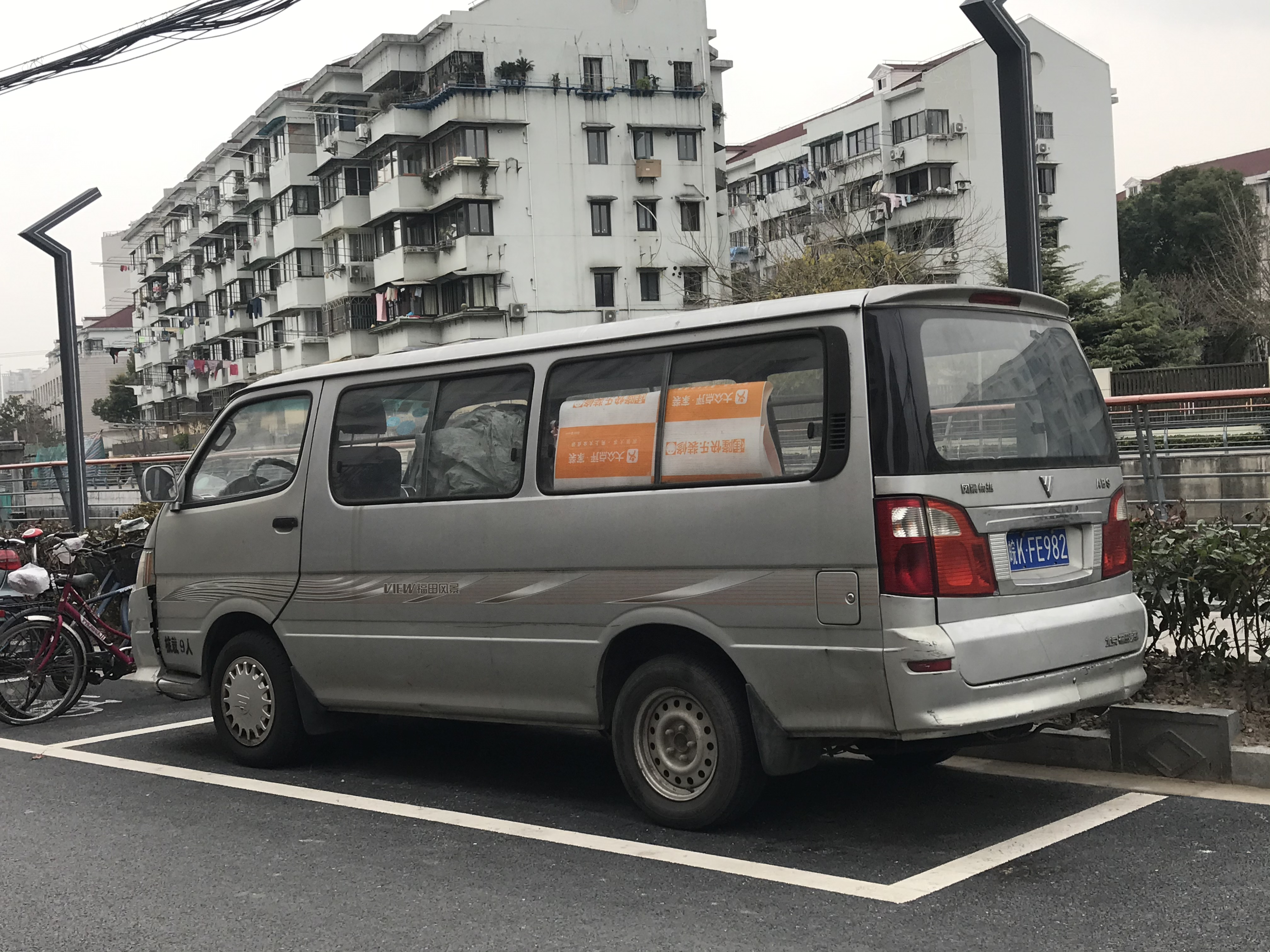
Foton View Kuaijie facelift rear

== Third generation: (G7/G9; 2014) ==
Foton View G7
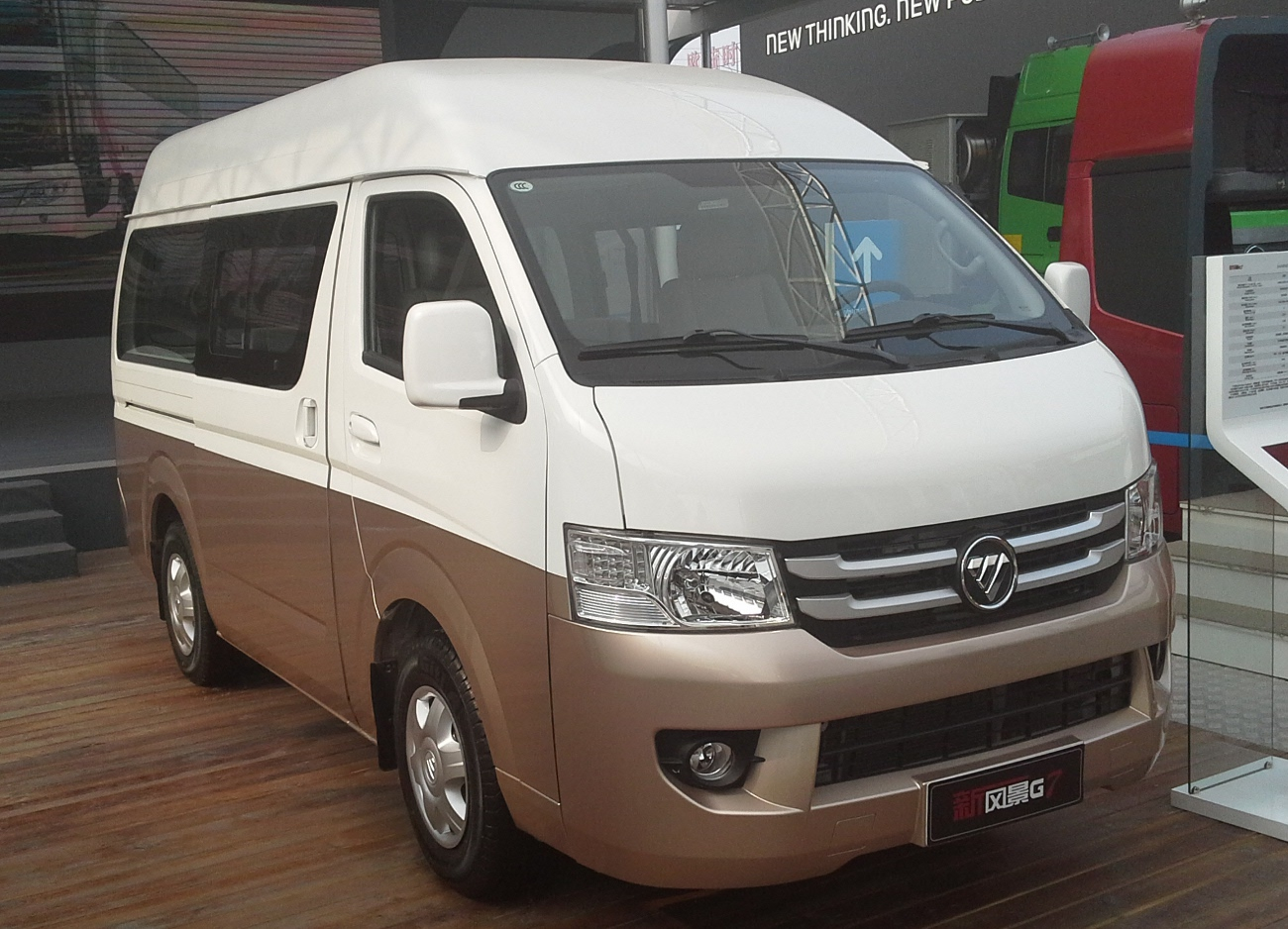

Overview
- Also called: Foton MP-X S Foton View CS2; Foton View Transvan (Normal Roof, Philippines); Foton View Traveller/Transvan HR (Hi-Roof, Philippines); Foton Columbus (Thailand); Foton View C2 (Malaysia); Foton View CS2
- Production: 2014–present
- Assembly: China: Changping District, Beijing; Malaysia: Tampoi, Johor (Berjaya Assembly Sdn Bhd); Philippines: Clark, Pampanga

Body and chassis
- Body style: 3-door van/minibus; 4-door van/minibus; 5-door van/minibus
- Layout: Front-engine, rear-wheel-drive / four-wheel drive

Powertrain
- Engine: 2.0 L BJ486-VVT I4; 2.2 L BJ491EQ4 I4; 2.0 L 4Di diesel I4; 2.5 L 4J25TC TDi turbo-diesel I4; 2.8 L 4JB1 TDi turbo-diesel I4
- Transmission: 5-speed manual 6-speed manual (G9 only); 6-speed automatic (2024–present)

Dimensions
- Wheelbase: Regular: 2,590 mm (102.0 in); Extended: 2,890 mm (113.8 in)
- Length: Regular: 5,020 mm (197.6 in); Extended: 5,320 mm (209.4 in)
- Width: 1,690 mm (66.5 in)
- Height: Regular: 1,935 mm (76.2 in); Extended: 2,050 mm (80.7 in); Roof extension: 2,225 mm (87.6 in)

The Foton MP-X S (蒙派克S) was launched in 2014 as a more premium model above the regular Foton View vans. The model was renamed to Foton View G9 as of 2016, while the Foton View G7 was released by Foton in 2014. The G7 and G9 models share all essential body parts as well as styling features with only the size being different. An additional model called the Foton View G5 was added later as a rebadged trim of the Foton MP-X.

Engine options of the Foton View G7 include a 2.0-liter gasoline engine and a 2.4-liter gasoline engine mated to a 5-speed manual transmission while engine options of the Foton View G9 includes a 2.4-liter gasoline engine and 2.8-liter turbo diesel engine mated to a 5-speed manual transmission or a 6-speed manual transmission.

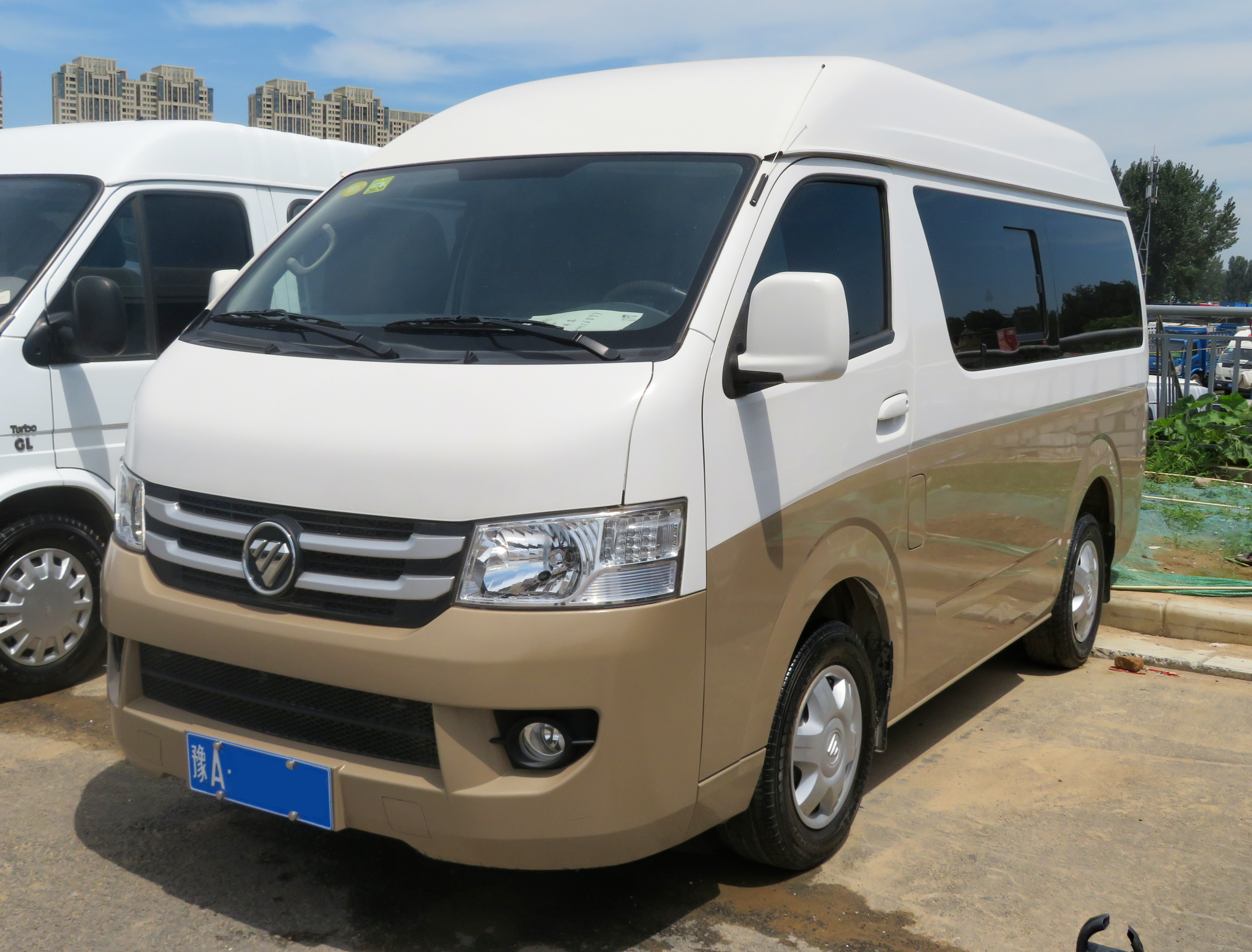
Foton View G7 high roof front

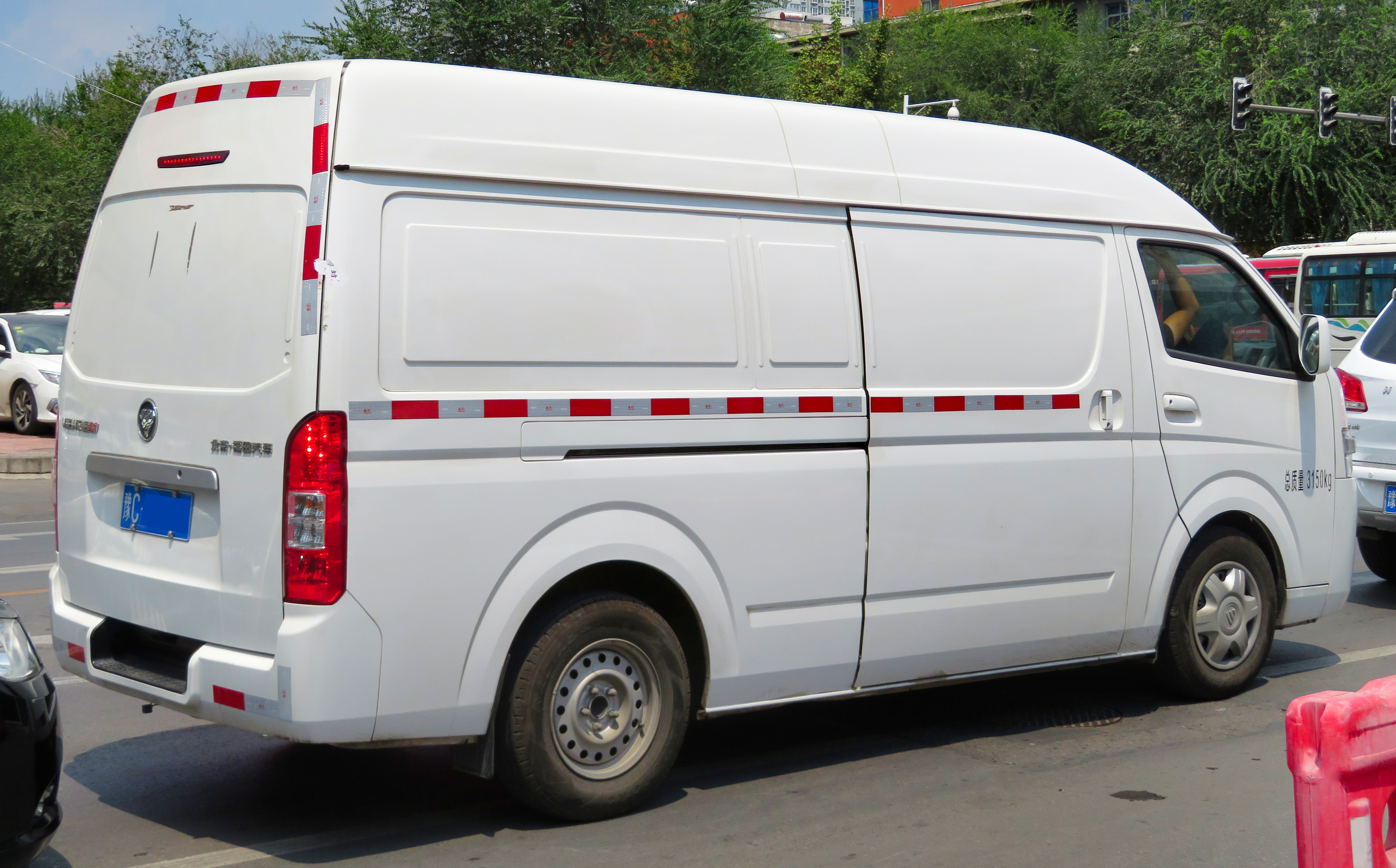
Foton View G9 high roof panel van rear

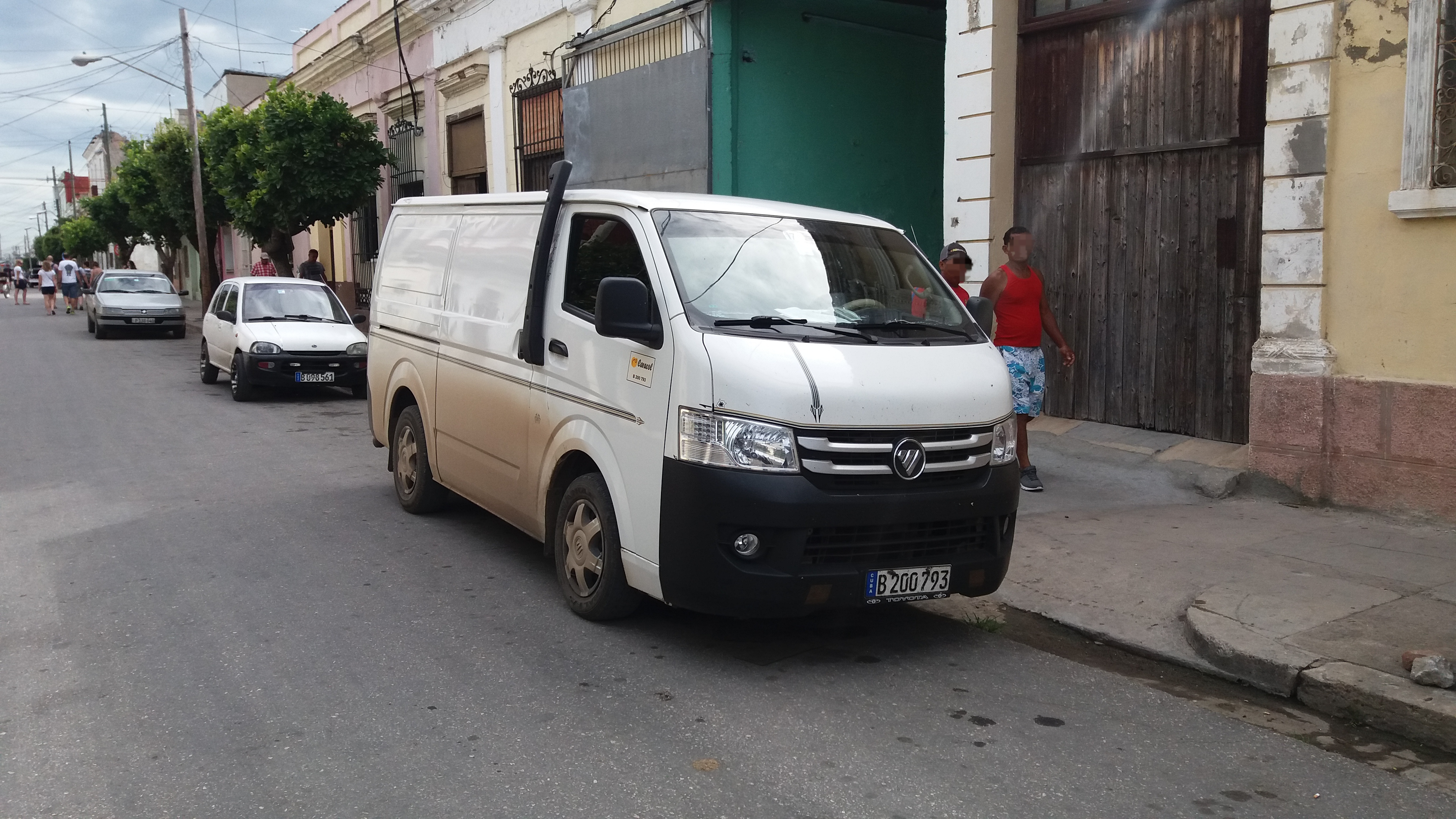
Foton View G7 in Cienfuegos

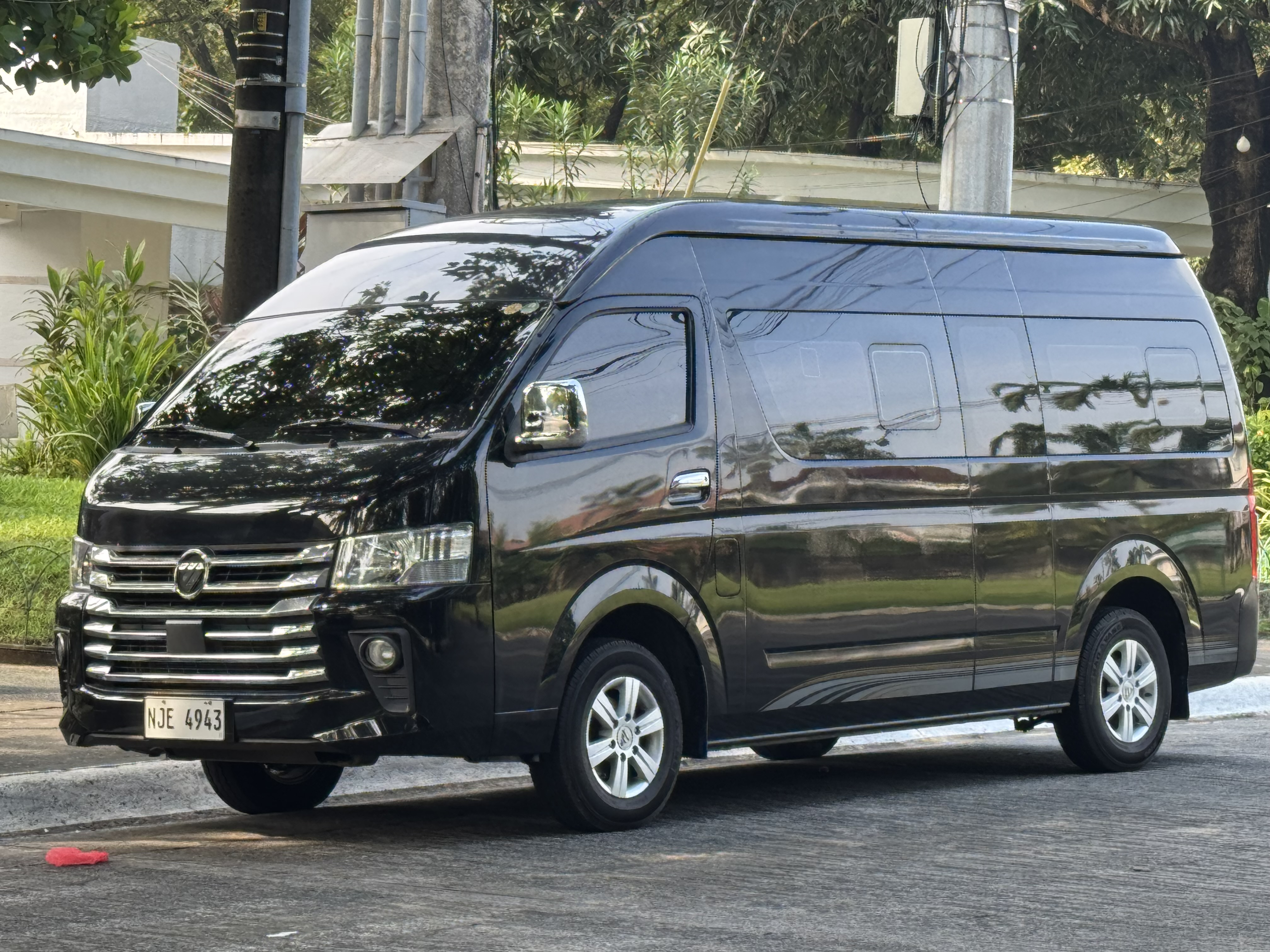
Foton View Traveller A-T

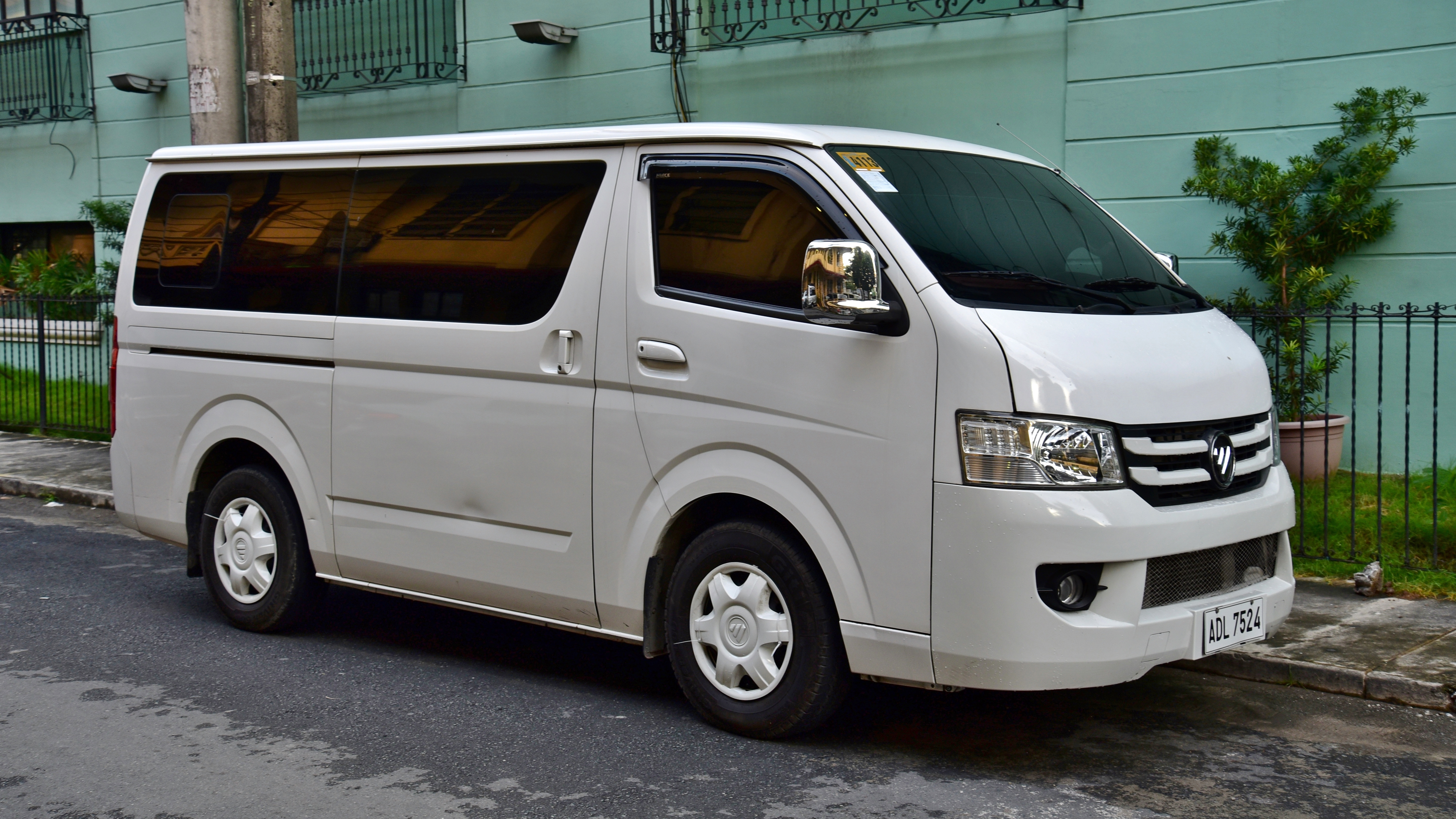
Foton View TransVan G7 front quarter in Intramuros

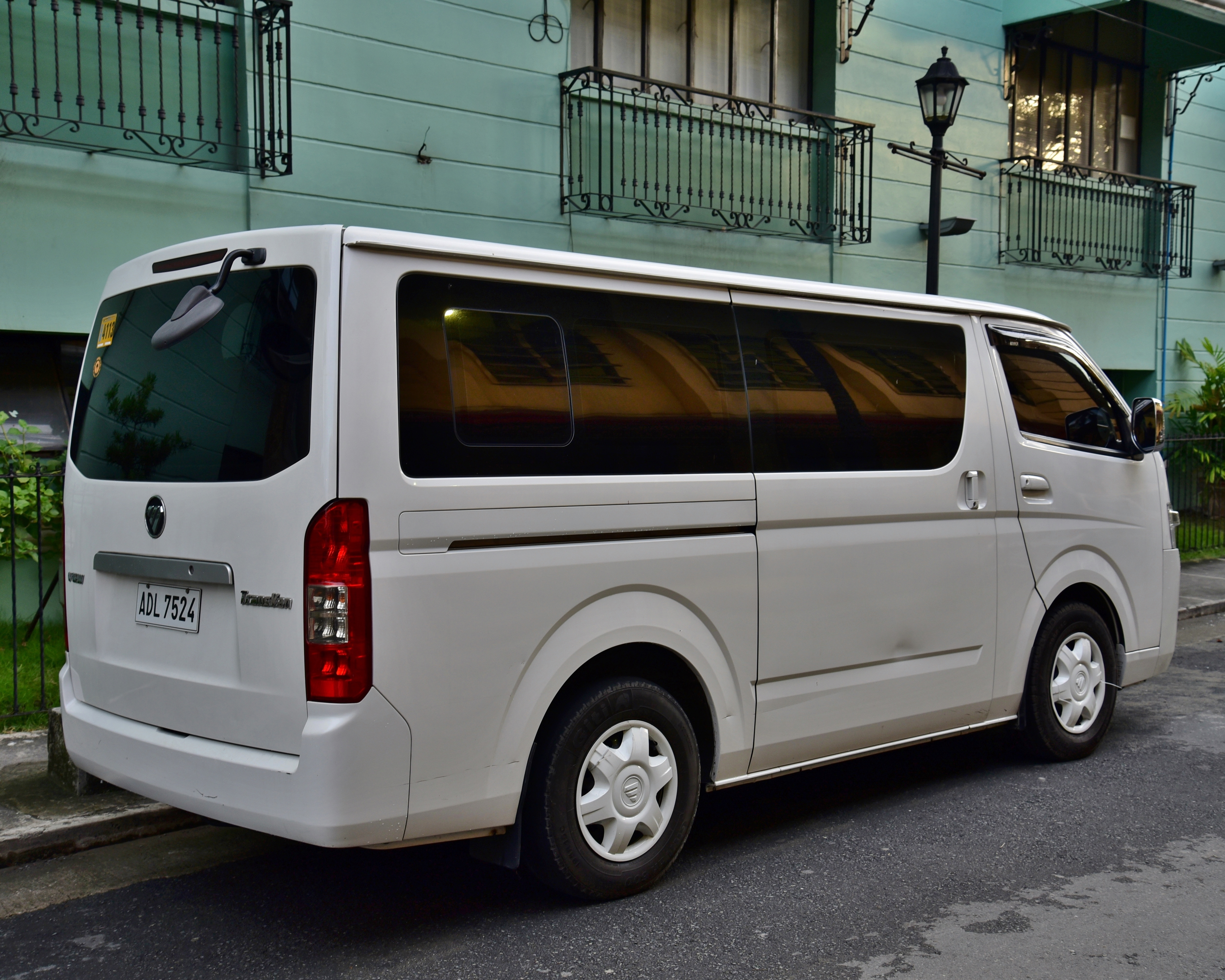
Foton View TransVan G7 rear quarter in Intramuros

=== Foton View Zhilan EV (2021) ===
An electric variant of the View G7/ G9 was available from 2021 named the G7/G9 Zhilan (智蓝) EV or IBlue for export markets. The G7 Zhilan EV features a 53kwh battery enabling a range of 230km.

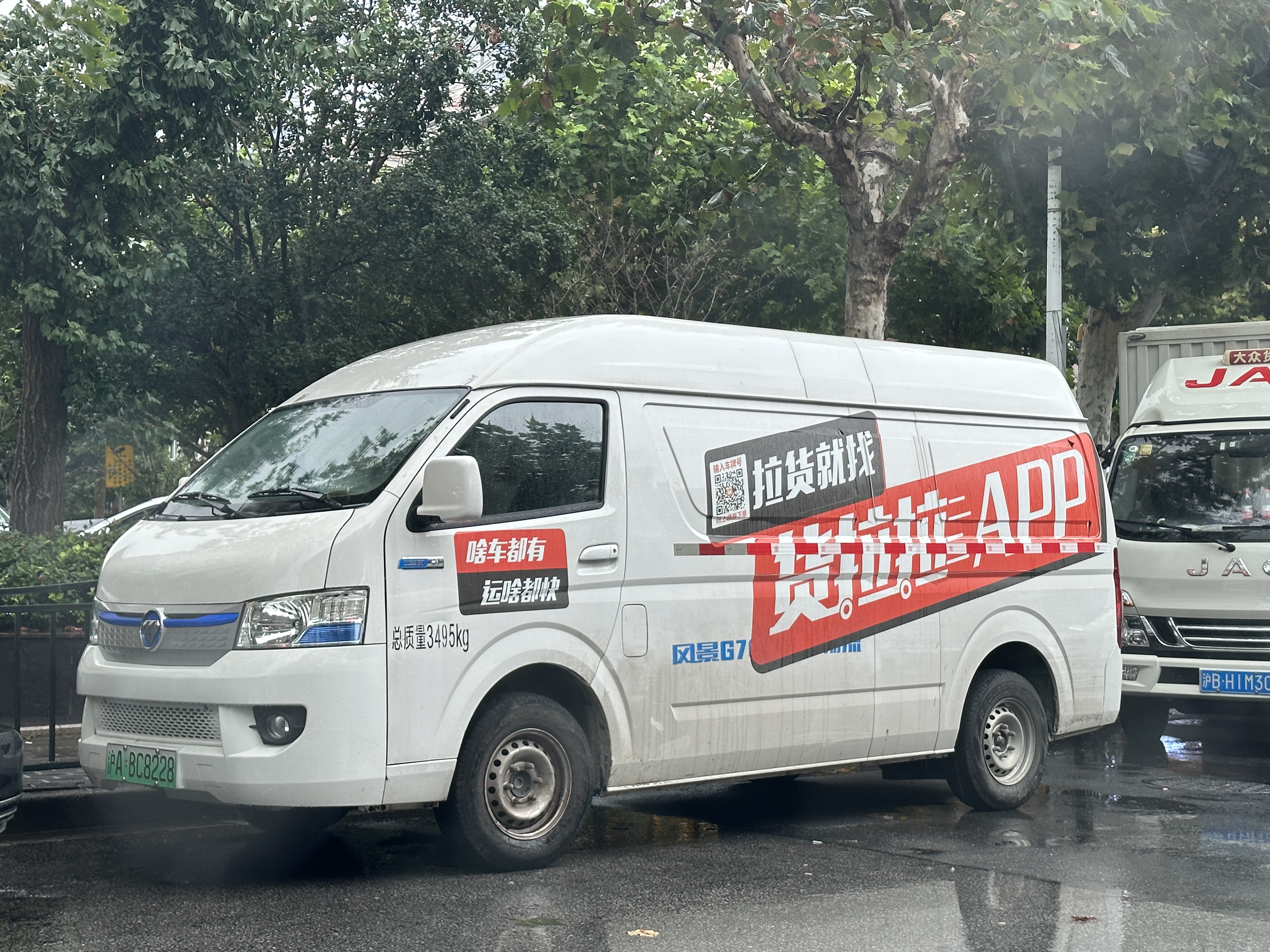
Foton View Zhilan G7 EV

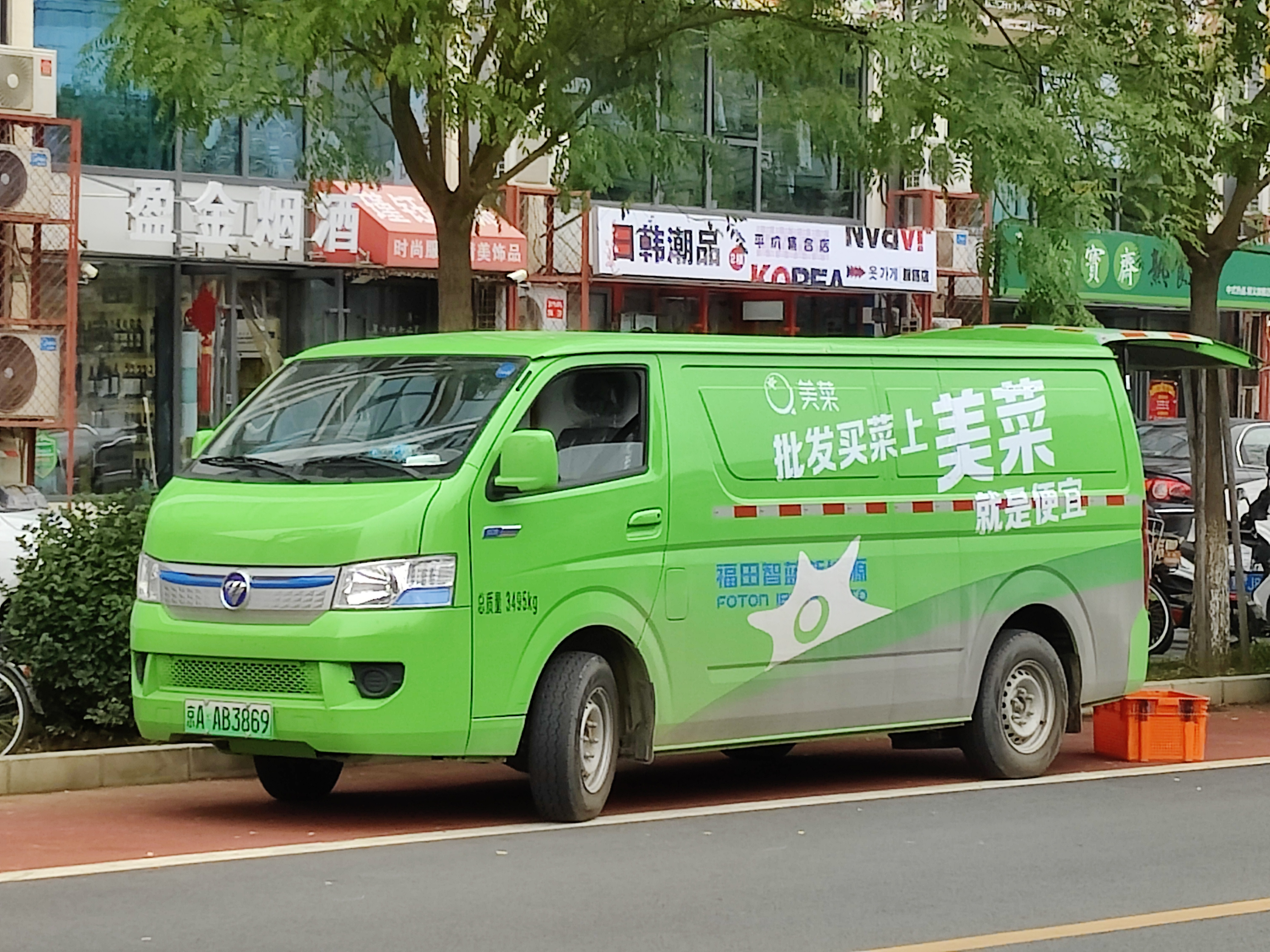
Zhilan G7 EV in Meicai livery

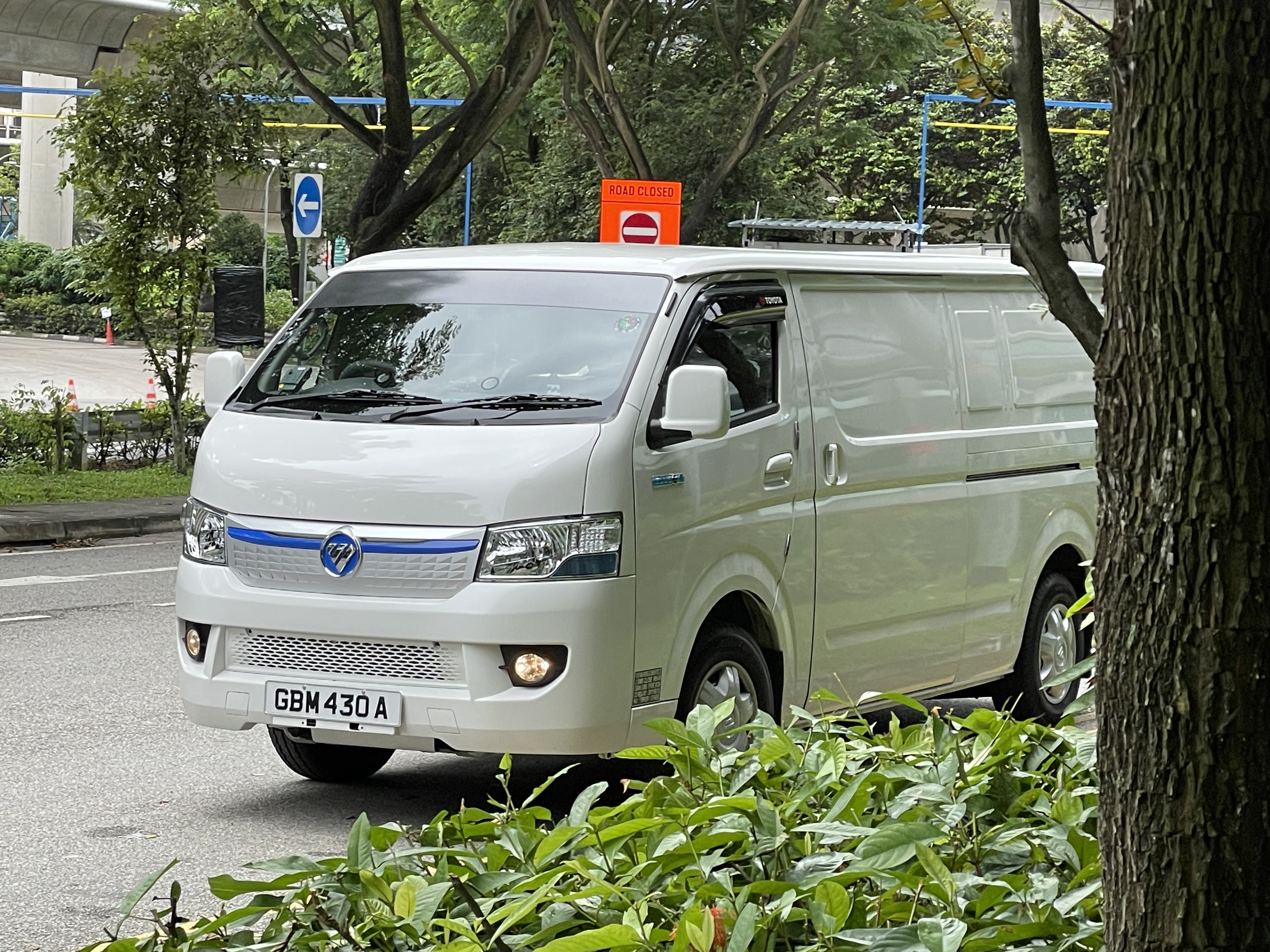
Foton IBlue

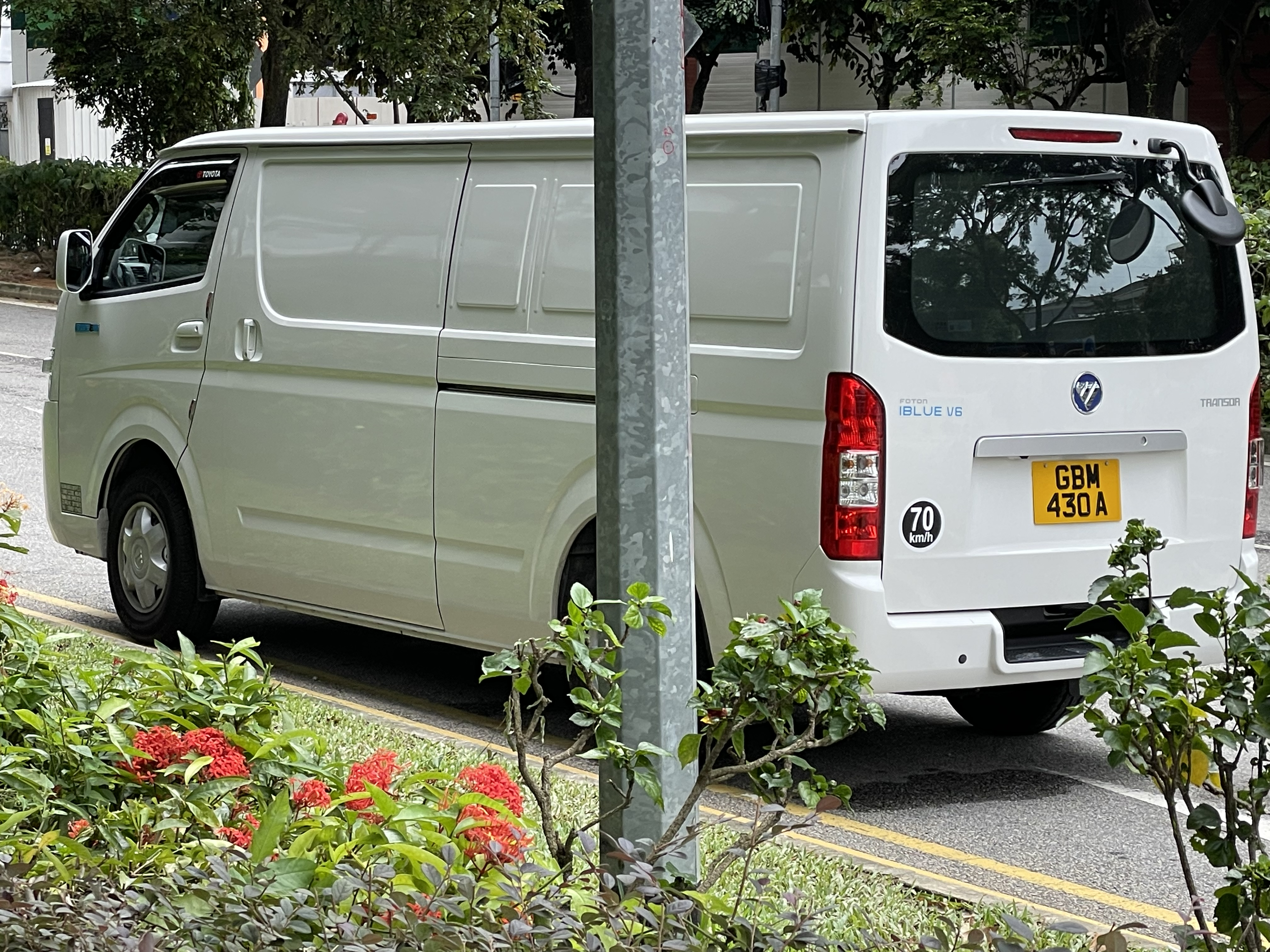
Foton IBlue rear

=== Foton View G7 Camaster (2023) ===
A retro-styled camper van variant of the Foton View G7 called the View G7 Camaster was launched in 2023, featuring camping gears and an optional retro-styled front fascia with round lamps.

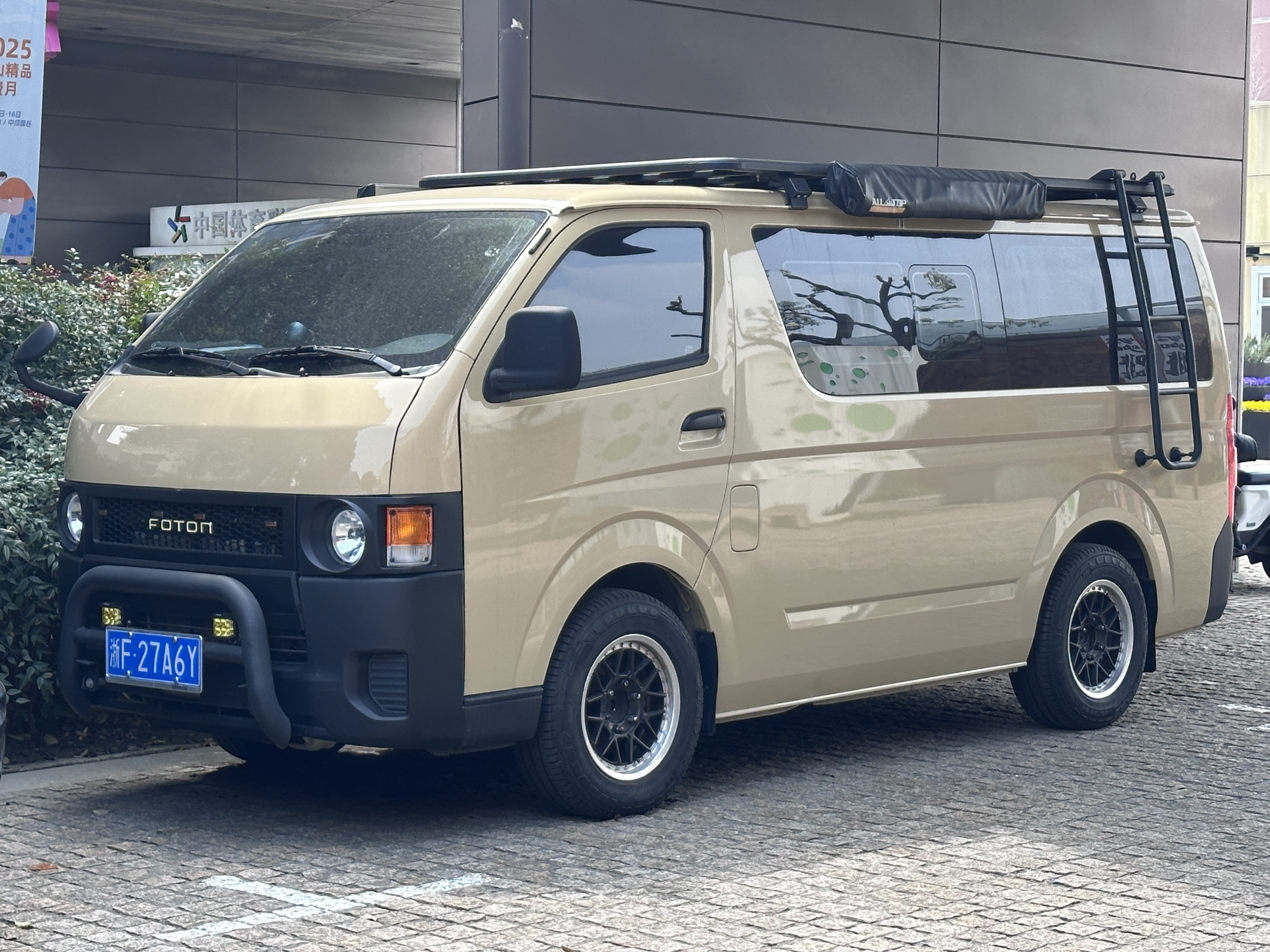
Foton View G7 Camaster

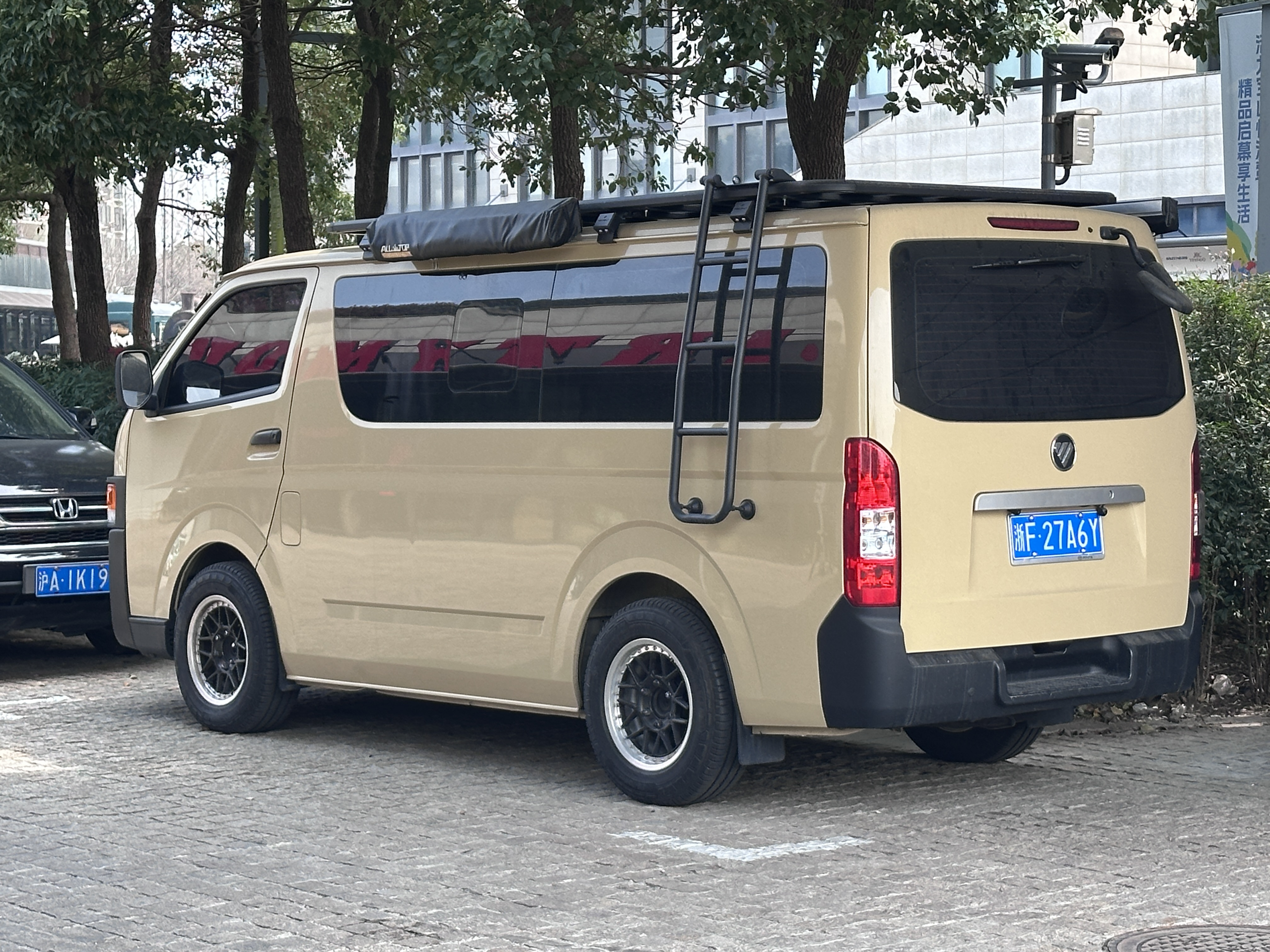
Rear

=== Controversies ===
The designs of the Foton View G7 and G9 models are controversial as they heavily resemble the fifth generation Toyota HiAce (H200) with similar body styles and overall vehicle dimensions. The Jinbei Grand Haise are among the various Chinese vans from domestic brands that chose to replicate the Toyota HiAce H200 vans with only minor styling differences. Other brands include government owned manufacturers including Rely and Jinbei.
