= Foton Saga =

Chinese automobile

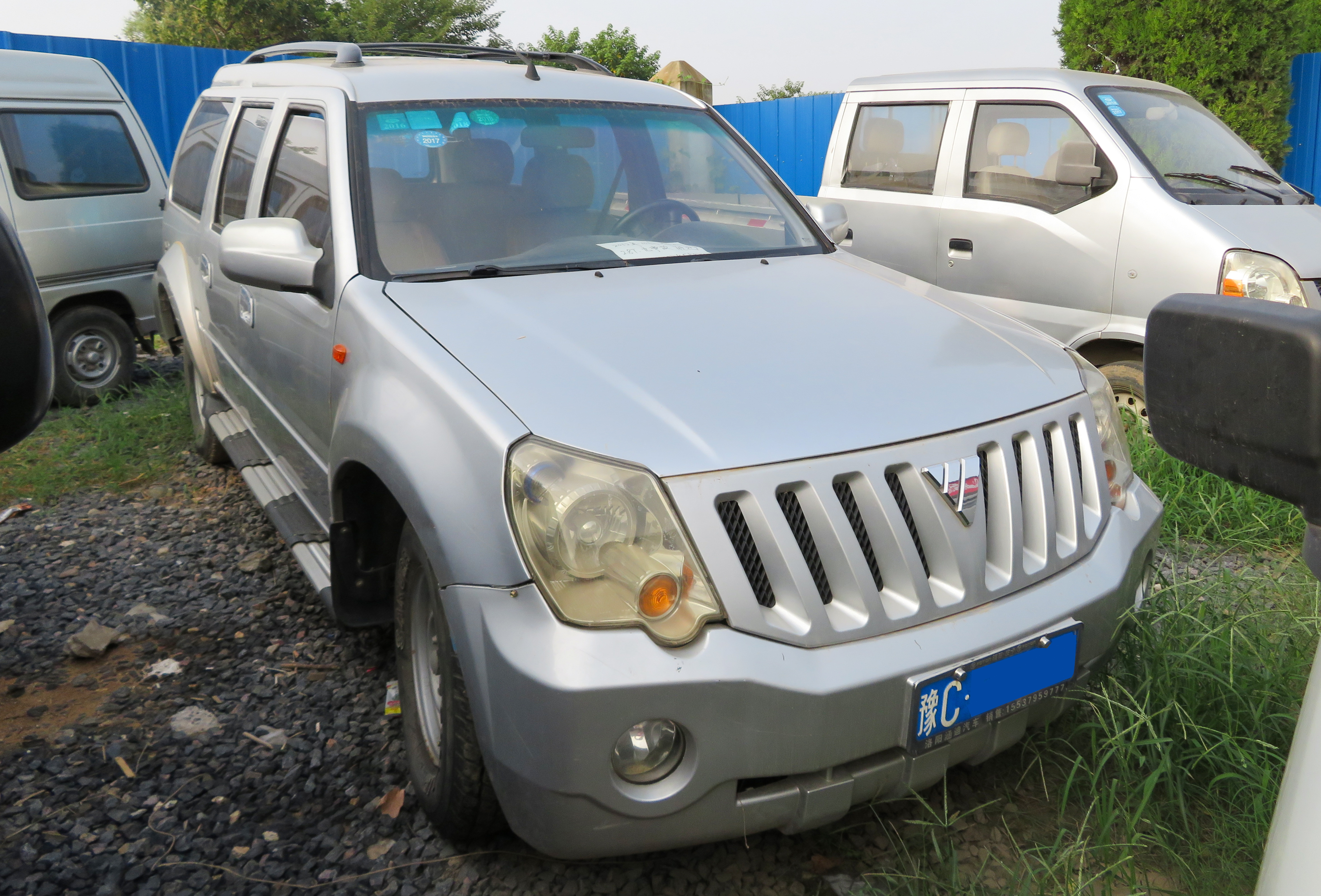
- Foton Saga SUV (facelift)

Overview
- Manufacturer: Foton Motor
- Also called: Foton Blizzard; Foton Tunland Saga CX; Foton Tunland CX; Foton SUP(萨普) (pickup); Samhung Chonji BJ1027 (North Korea)
- Production: 2003–2010 (Saga); 2003–2022 (SUP)
- Assembly: Changping District, Beijing (Foton)

Body and chassis
- Class: Compact SUV; Pickup truck
- Related: Foday Explorer

Powertrain
- Engine: 1.5 L DAM15KL I4 (petrol); (2021–2022); 2.2 L I4 (petrol); (2011–2015); 2.4 L 4G69S4N I4 (petrol); (2015–2018); 2.0 L I4 (turbo diesel); (2011); 2.8 L I4 (turbo diesel); (2011–2016)
- Transmission: 5-speed manual

Dimensions
- Wheelbase: 2,760 mm (109 in)
- Length: 4,705 mm (185.2 in)
- Width: 2,060 mm (81 in)
- Height: 1,685 mm (66.3 in)

Chronology
- Successor: Foton Tunland

The Foton Saga is a 5-seater compact SUV produced by Foton Motor that later spawned a pickup version called the Foton SUP or Foton Sapu (萨普).

== Overview ==
The overall styling of the Foton Saga is related to the fact that the vehicle body was supplied by Foday which was also shared with the Foday Explorer.

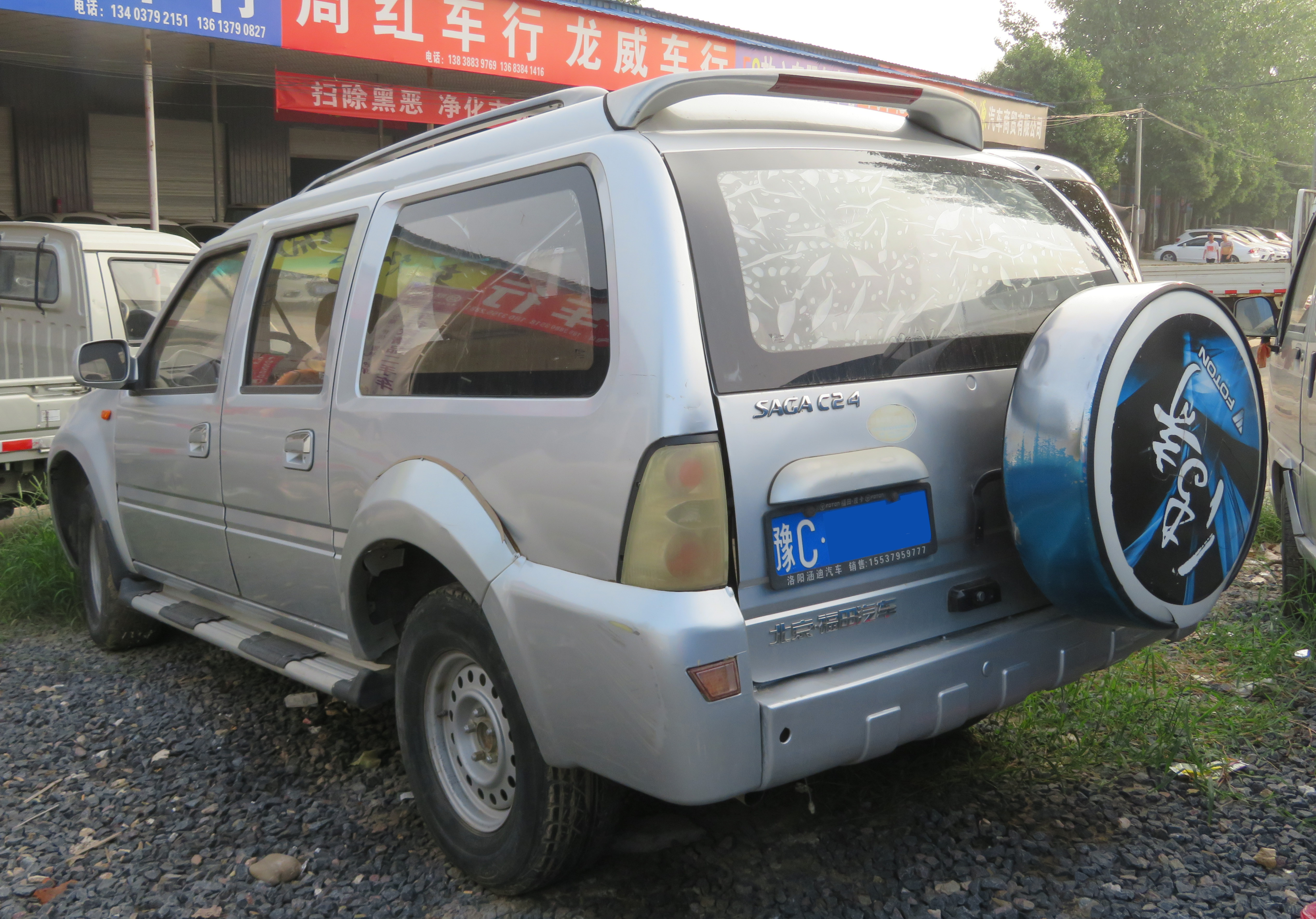
Foton Saga SUV rear

== Pickup variants ==
The pickup variants were sold as Foton Saga and Foton SUP. Both pickup variants also feature Foday-supplied vehicle bodies, and share the same body as the Foday Little Superman. The Foton Saga was sold from 2003 to 2010 and was replaced by the Foton Tunland shortly after due to slow sales, leaving the Foton SUP pickup being the only remaining body style available. Prices of the Foton SUP ranges from 50,880 to 90,985 yuan.

The Foton SUP received a few facelifts through the years, with the latest ones only updating the grilles.

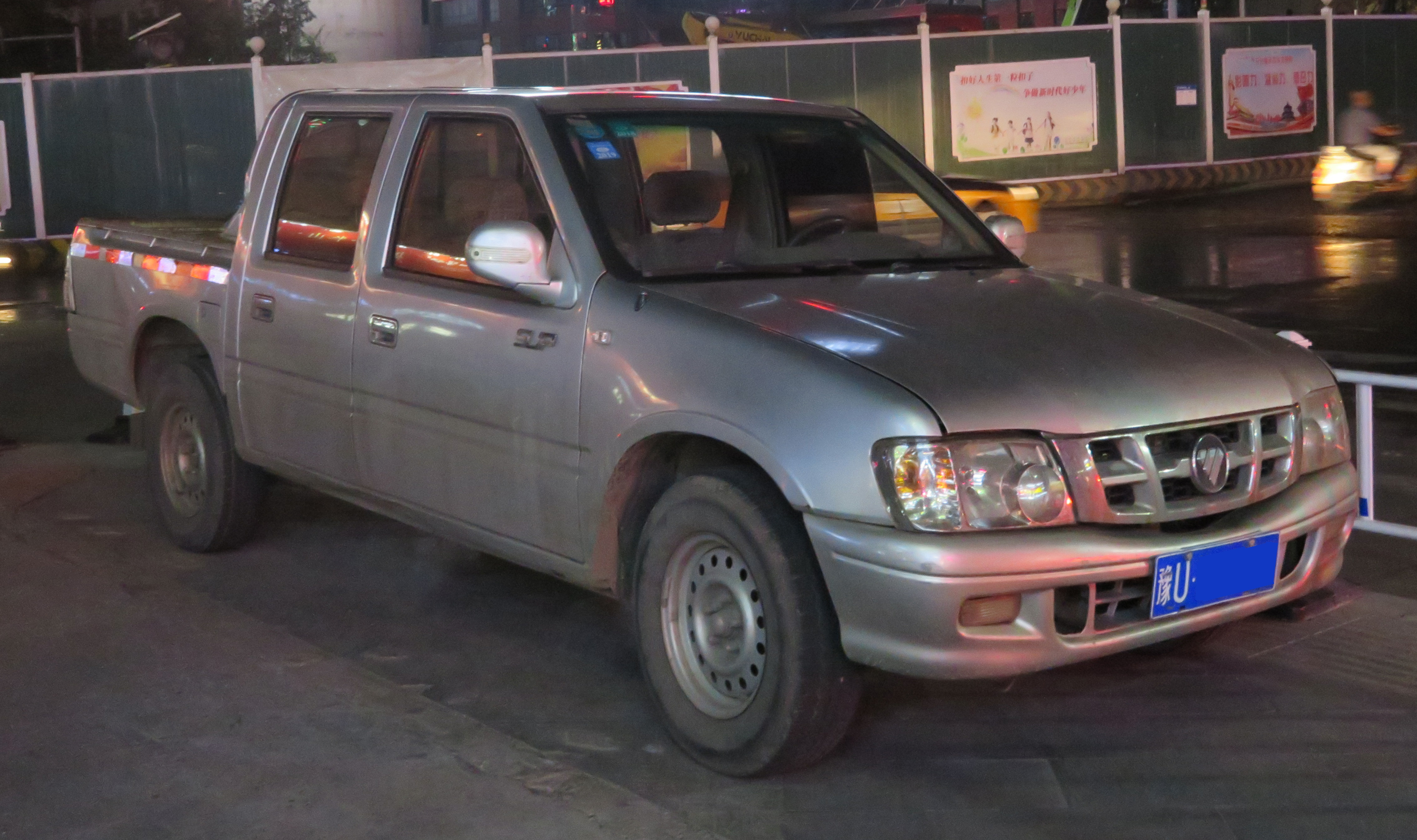
Pre-facelift Foton SUP

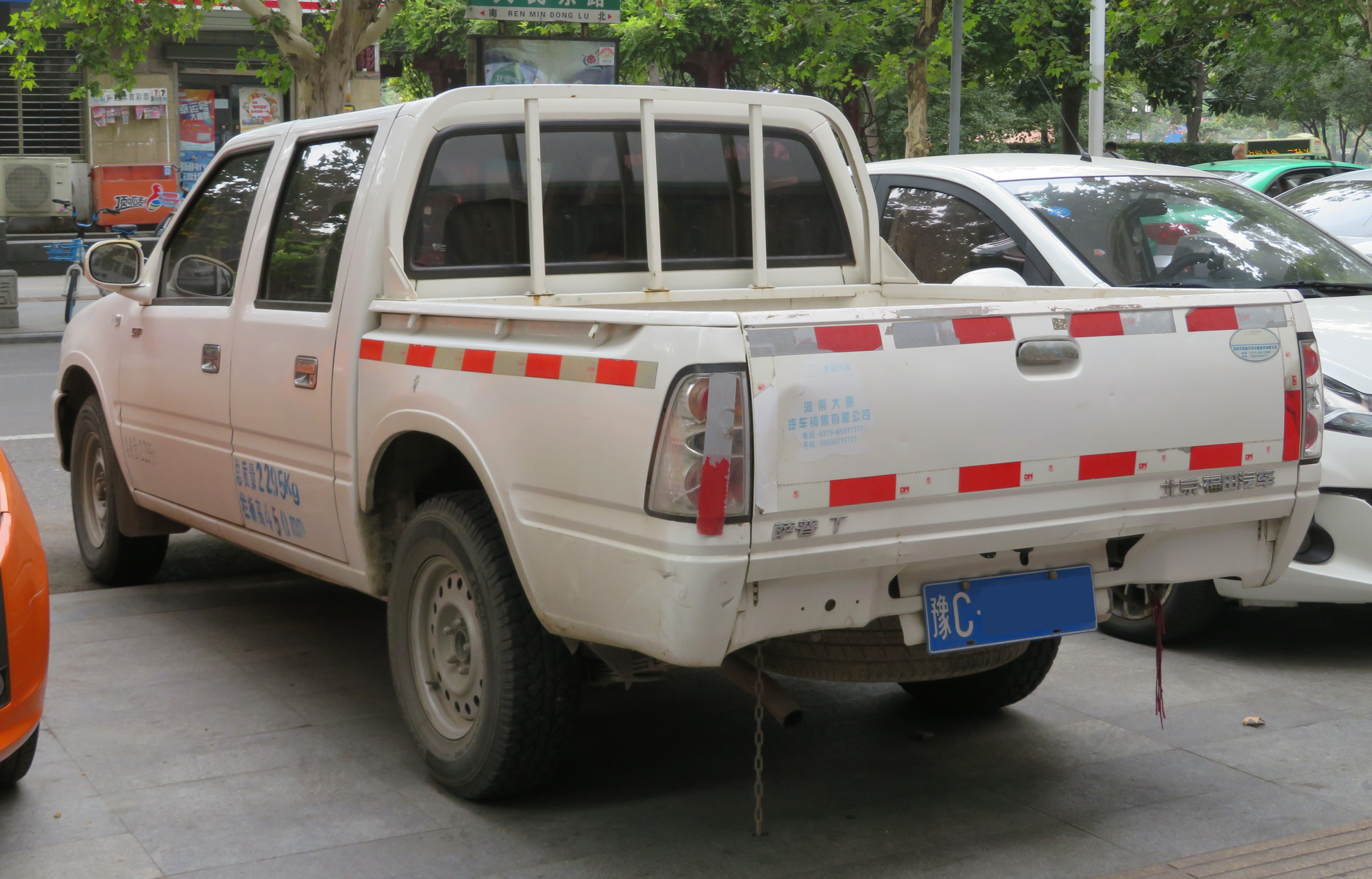
Pre-facelift Foton SUP rear
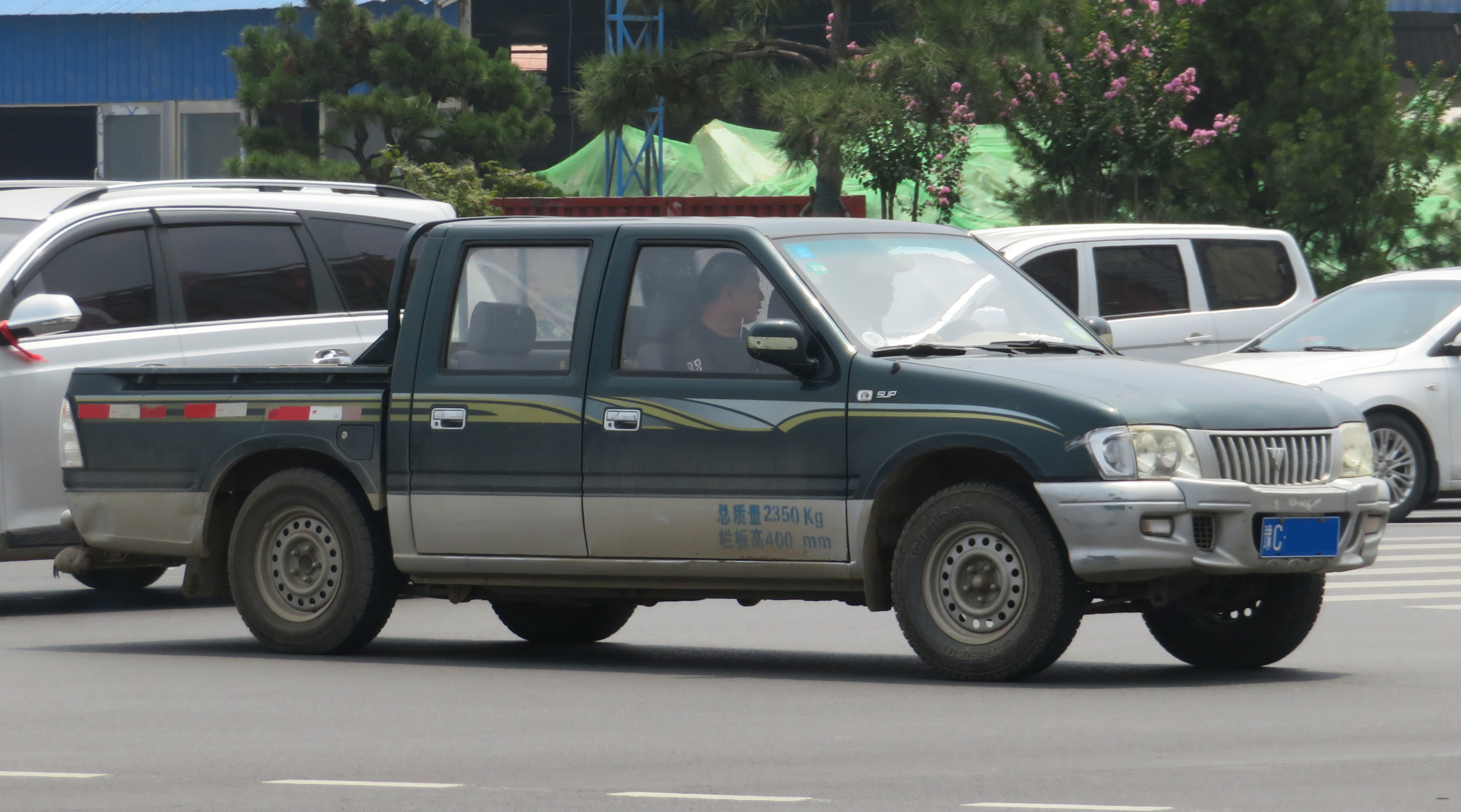
Foton SUP II

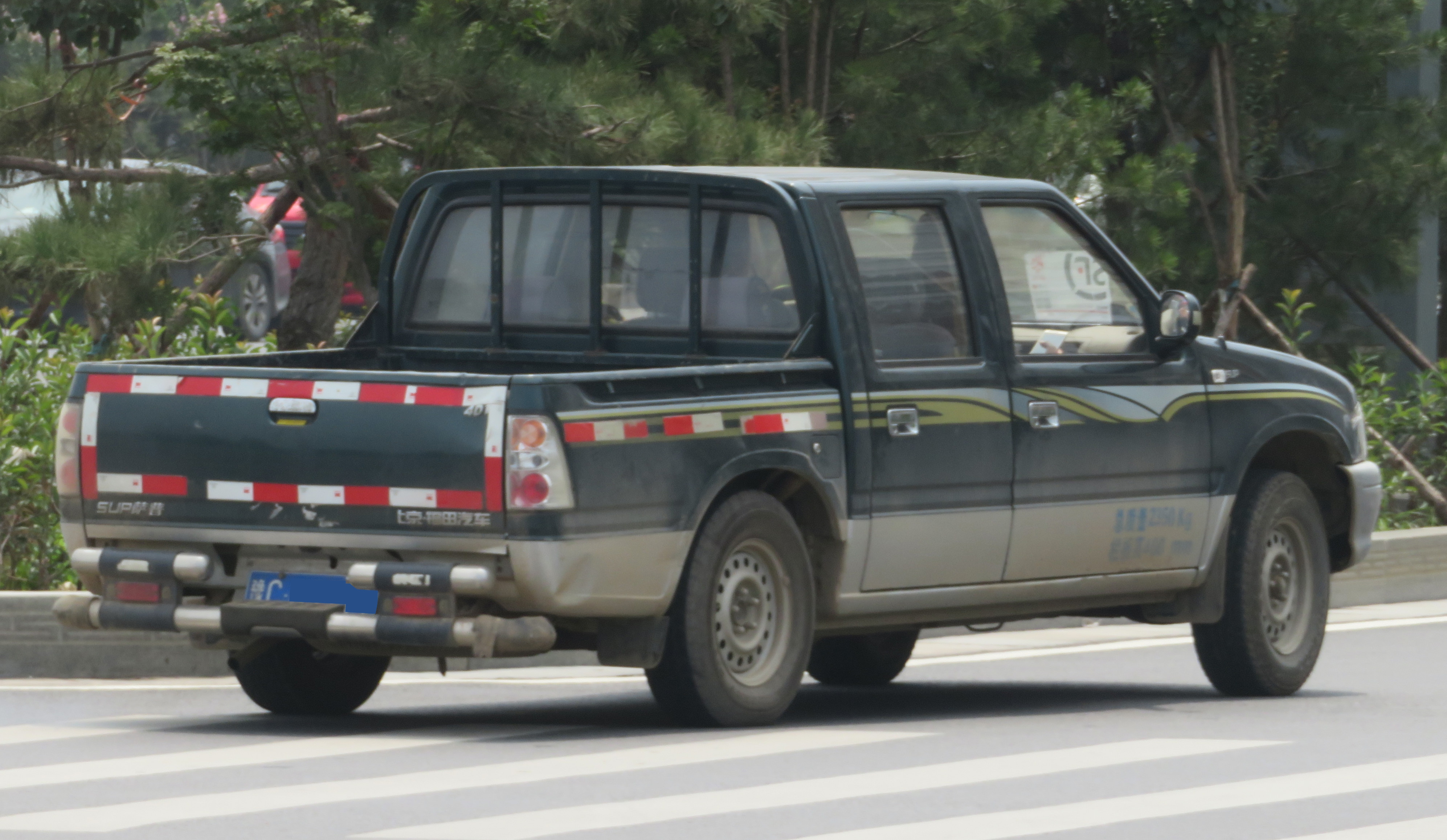
Foton SUP II rear
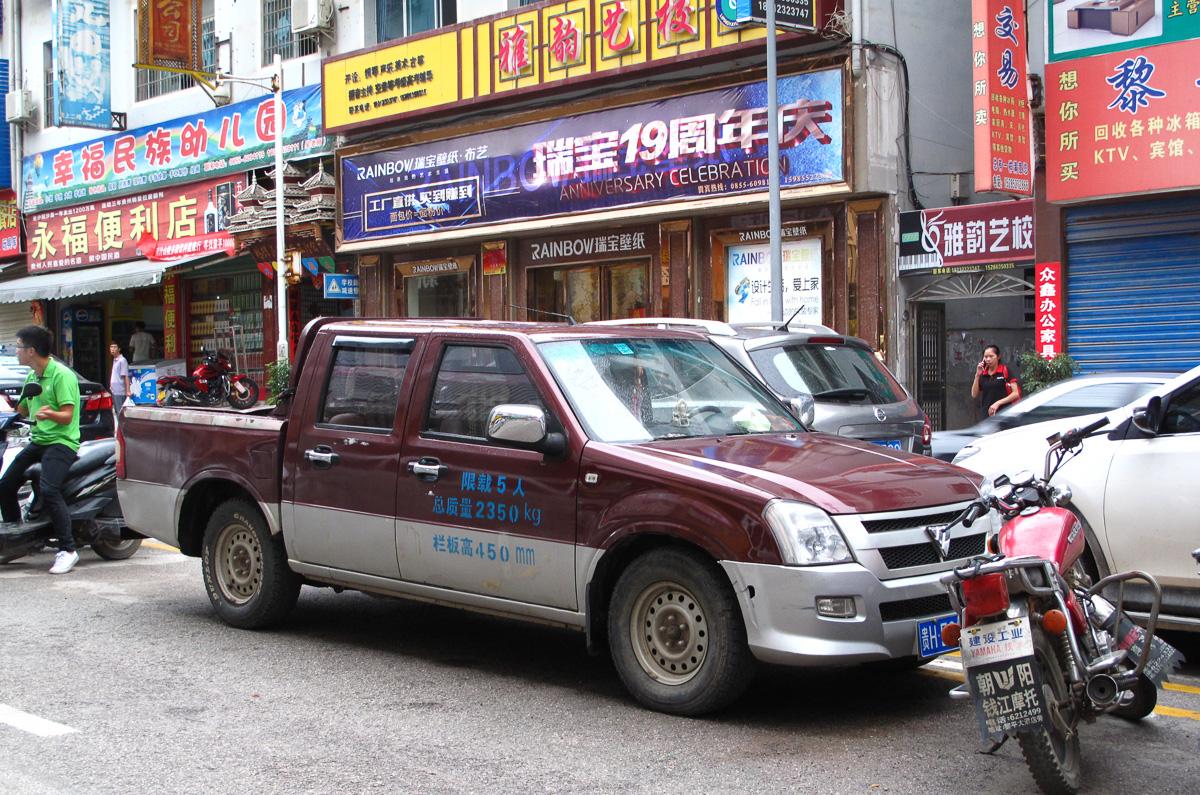
Second facelift Foton III
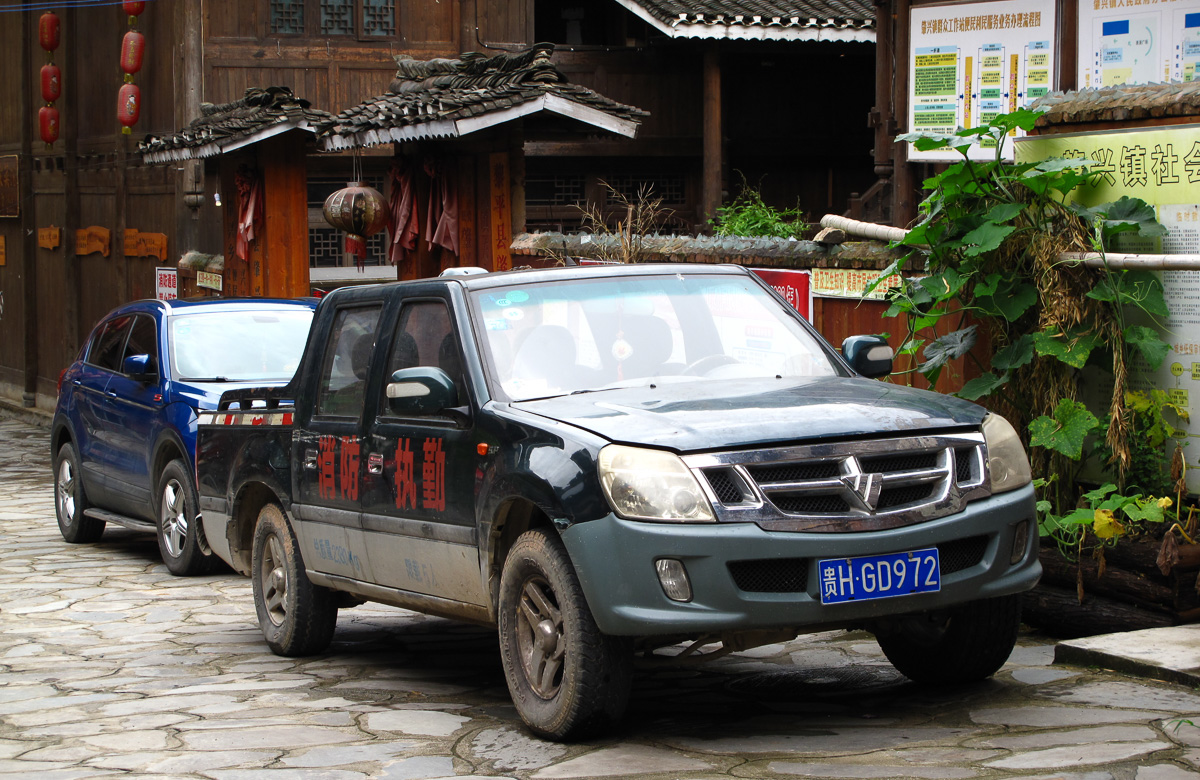
Second facelift Foton IV
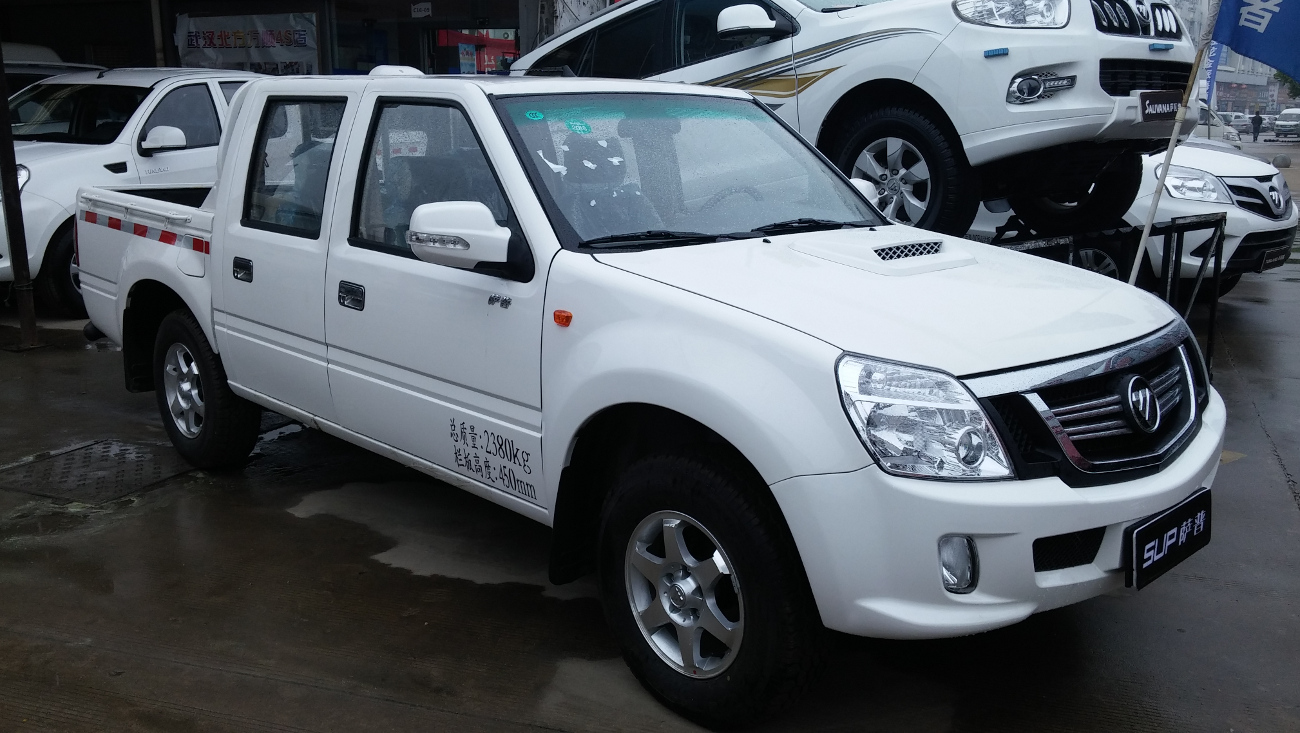
Second facelift Foton V

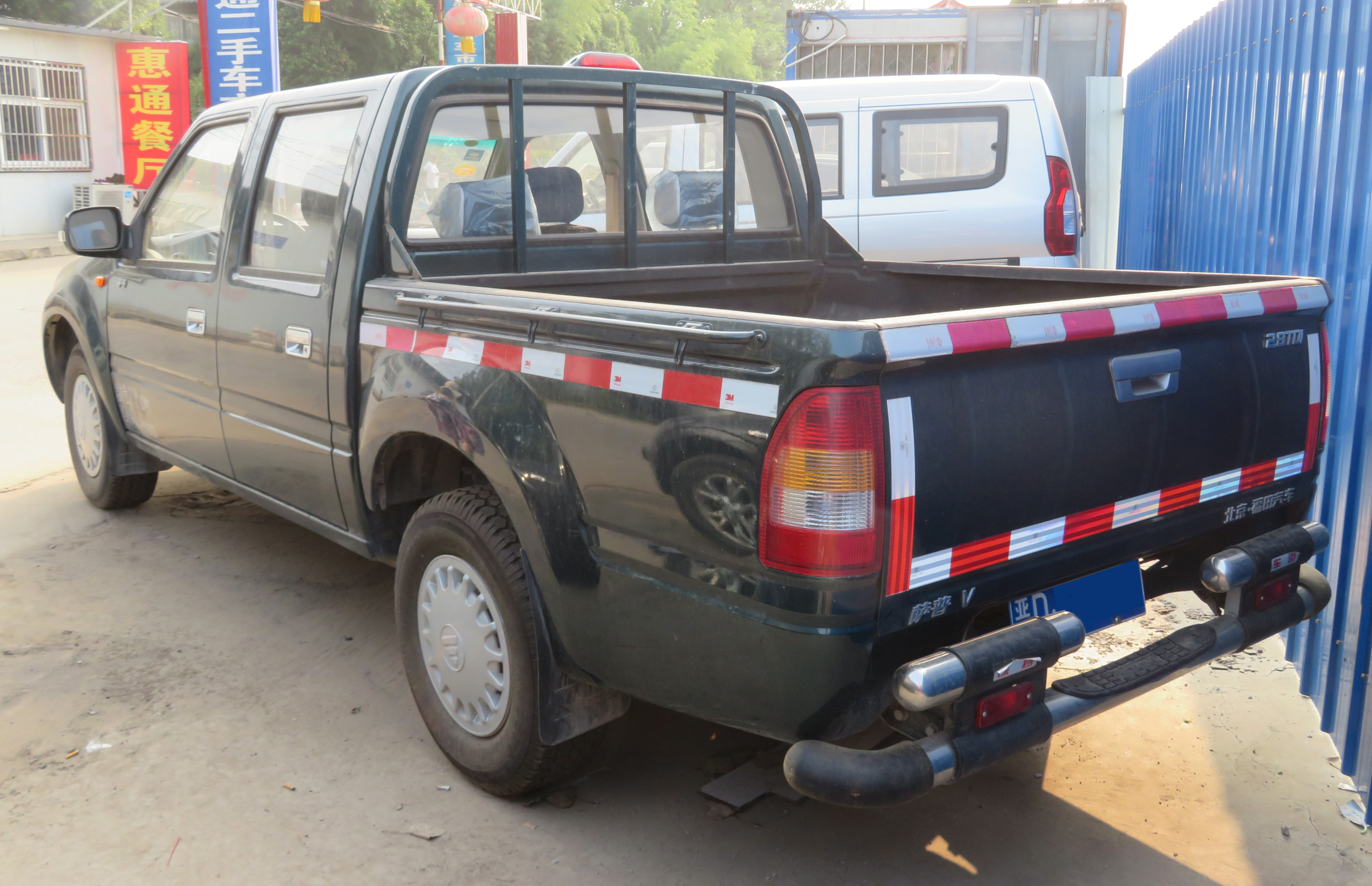
Foton SUP V rear
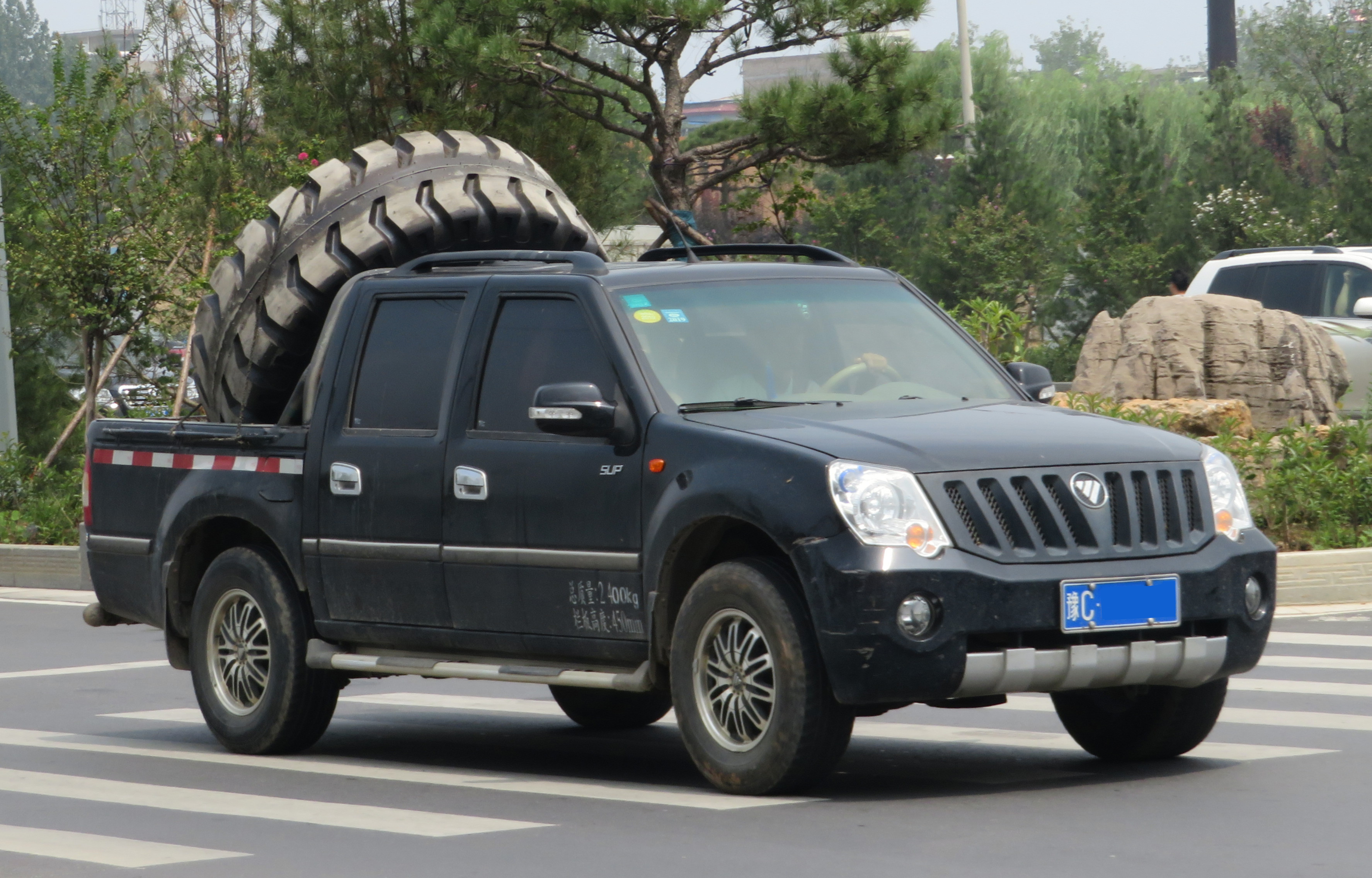
Foton SUP VII

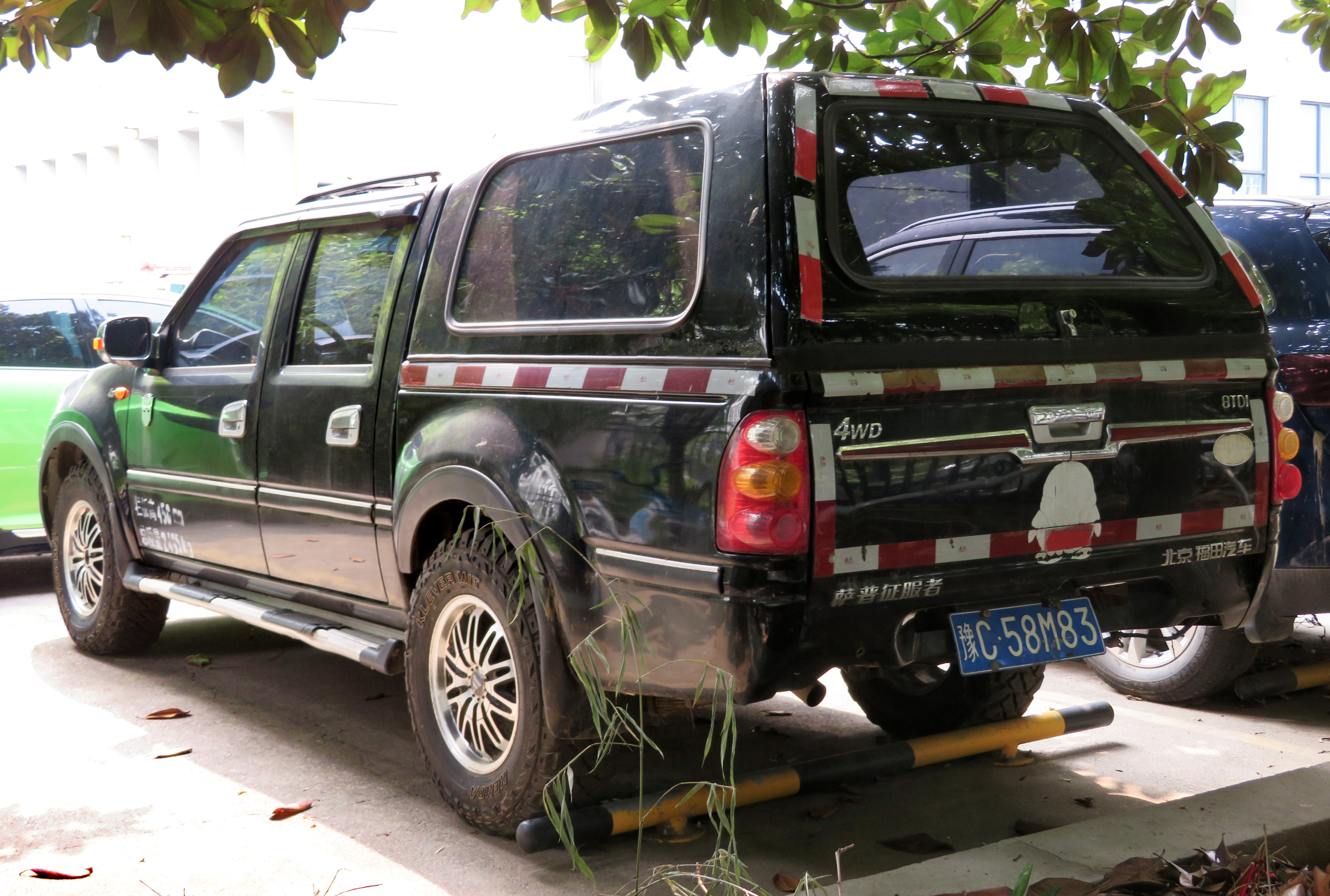
Foton SUP VII rear

=== Powertrain ===
As of 2021, the Foton Saga pickup is only offered with a 1.5-litre inline-four engine producing 87 kW (116 hp) and 150 N⋅m (111 lb⋅ft).
