= Foton Tunland =

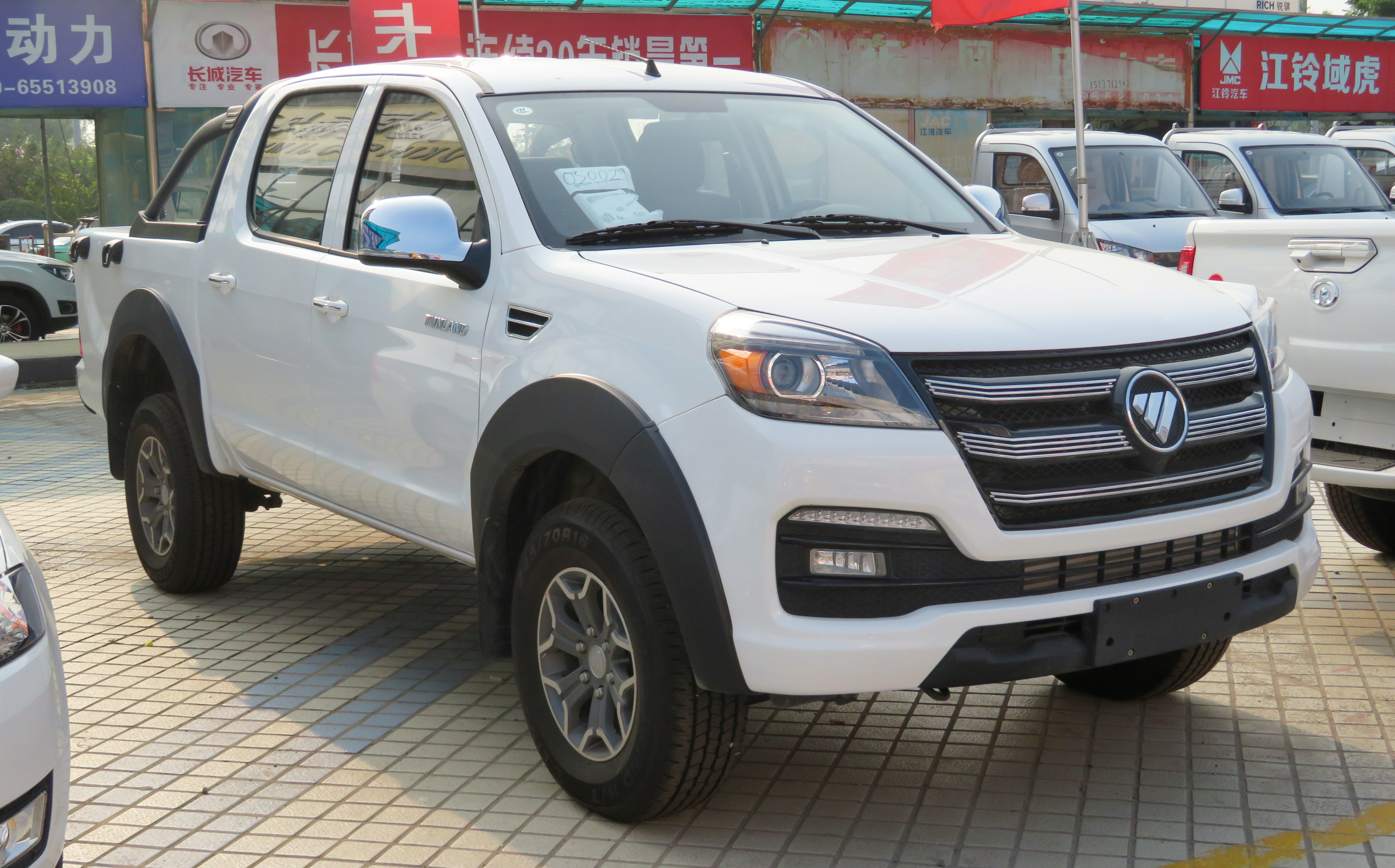
- Foton Tunland E5 2018 facelift

Overview
- Manufacturer: Foton Motor
- Also called: Foton Tunland (China, Thailand, Australia, Iran and Colombia); Foton FT-500 (Chile only); Foton Terracota; Foton Thunder (Philippines only); Bison Savanna (Malaysia); Foton Tunland Shengtu 5 Foton Tunland Shengtu 7 Foton Chuangfuniu; Foton General F1; Encava EP-1000 (2018 facelift Venezuela); GTV Kouprey (Cambodia, rebadged Tunland V7); GTV Kouprey Pro (Cambodia, rebadged Tunland V9); Samhung Chonji BJ1037 (North Korea)
- Production: 2011–present
- Model years: 2012–present
- Assembly: Bangchan, Bangkok, Thailand (BGAC, Bangchan General Assembly Co., Ltd.; End production June 2019) Clark, Pampanga, Philippines (Since 2016) Kandal Steung District, Kandal Province, Cambodia (GTV Motor Cambodia; assembly of Kouprey and Kouprey Pro); Pasir Gudang District, Johor, Malaysia (Acacia Motor Services) (2026)

Body and chassis
- Class: Compact pickup truck Full-size pickup truck
- Body style: 2 door pickup 4 door pickup
- Layout: Front-engine rear-wheel drive / Four-wheel drive

Powertrain
- Engine: 2.0 L 4G24 I4 (turbo petrol); 2.4 L 4G69 I4 (petrol); 2.8 L Cummins ISF I4 (turbo diesel); 2.0 L Aucan (turbo diesel)
- Transmission: 5-speed manual 6-speed ZF automatic
- Battery: 100 kWh (hybrid)

Dimensions
- Wheelbase: 3,105 mm (122.2 in)
- Length: 5,310 mm (209.1 in)
- Width: 1,880 mm (74.0 in)
- Height: 1,860 mm (73.2 in)
- Curb weight: 1,790–1,950 kg (3,946–4,299 lb)

Chronology
- Predecessor: Foton SUP

The Foton Tunland is a compact pickup truck and full-size pickup truck (since 2023) sold by the Chinese manufacturer Foton Motor sold in China since November 2011 as well as Australia, Colombia, and emerging markets. Since 2023 the Mars 7 and 9 full-size pickups have been sold under the Tunland nameplate outside of China, as the Tunland V7 and Tunland V9 respectively.

== Overview ==
To help manufacture the Tunland, joint venture agreements were signed between Foton and established brands, including Cummins diesel engines, Getrag transmission, a BorgWarner transfer case and Dana axles and differentials in the 4×4 (the 2-Wheel drive has a Tangshan 5 speed transmission), Bosch electronics and ABS.

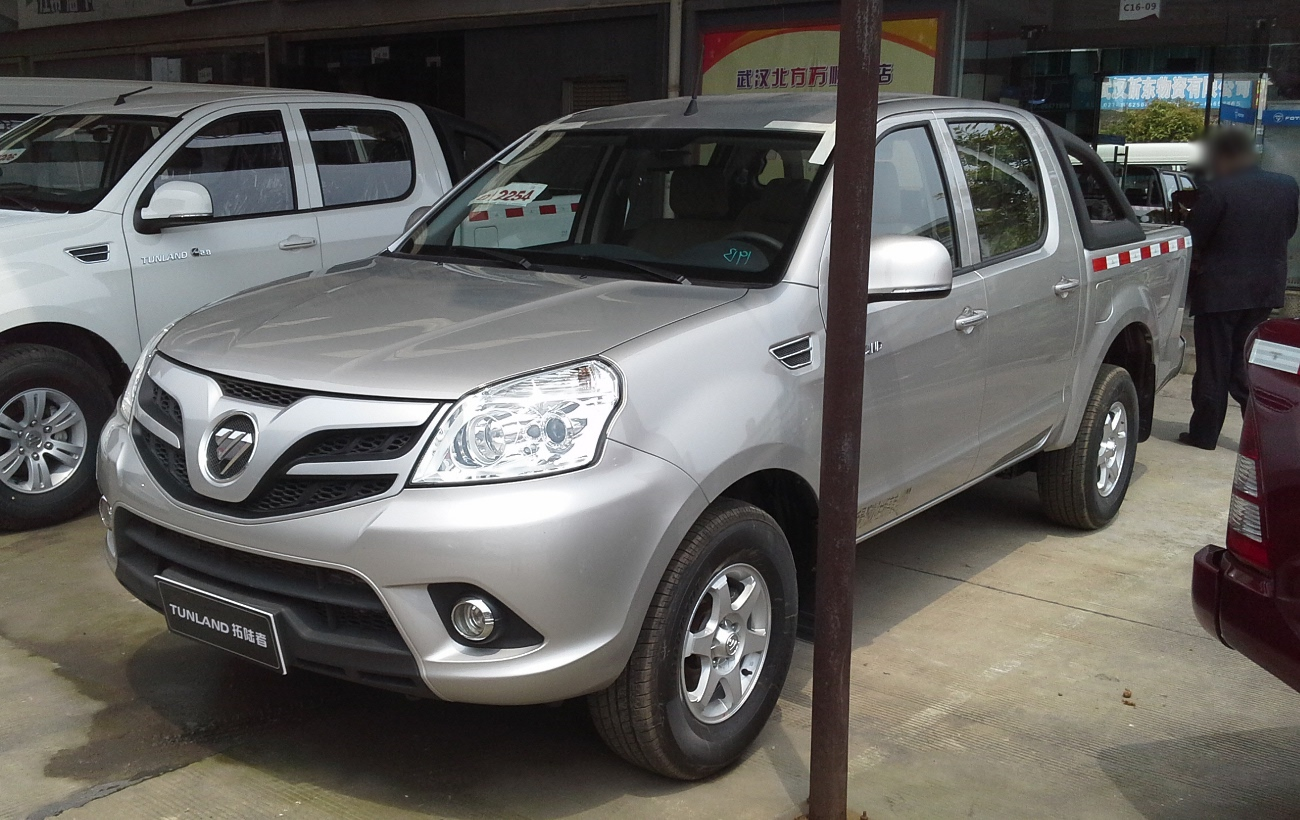
Foton Tunland E3 front

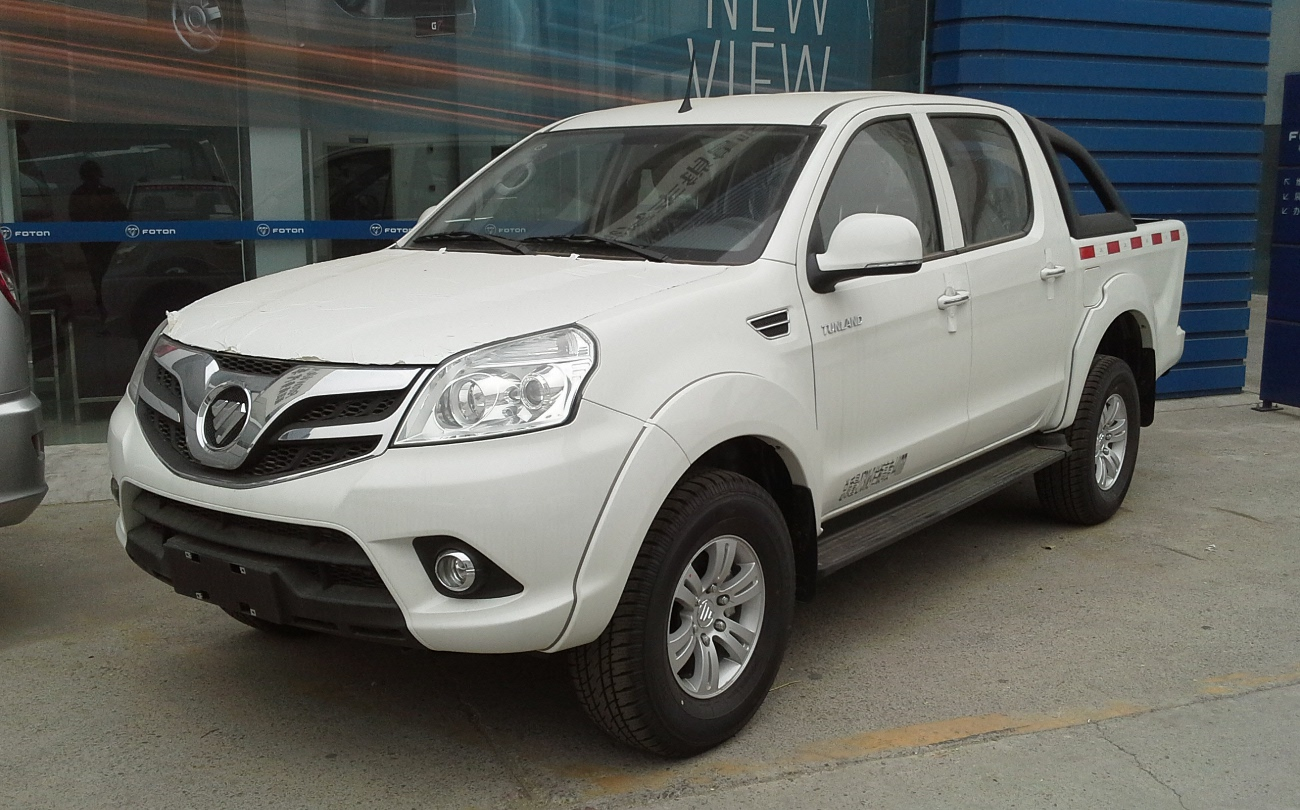
Foton Tunland E5 front (Note the added claddings)

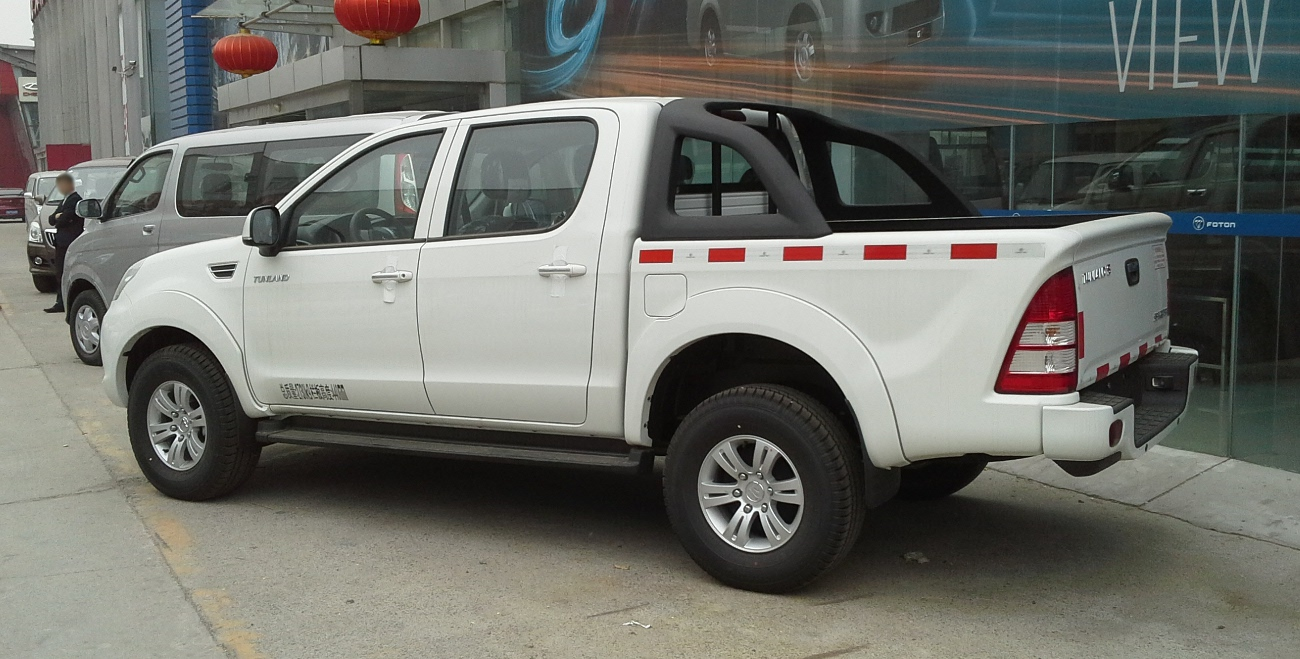
Foton Tunland E5 rear (Note the added claddings)

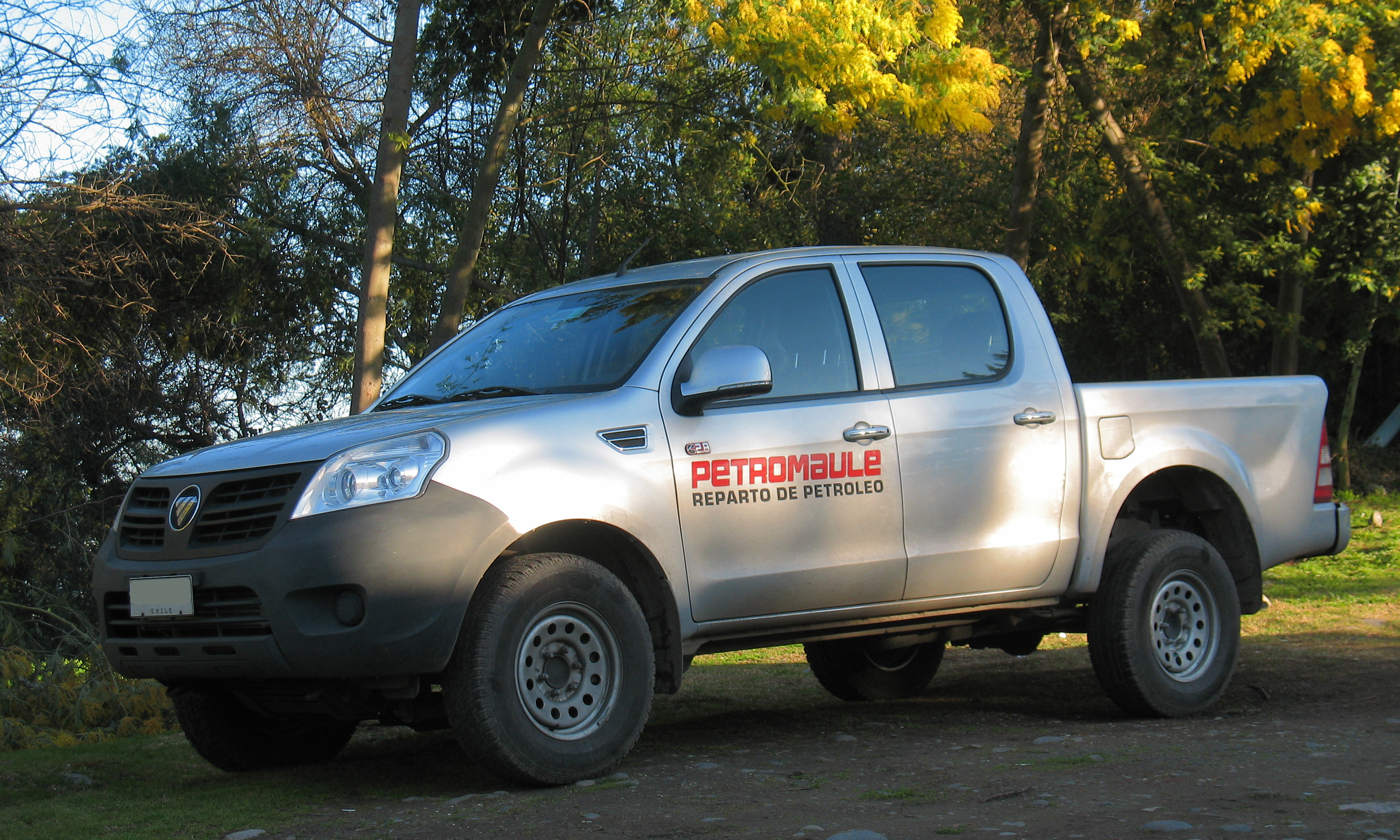
Foton Tunland FT-500 in Chile

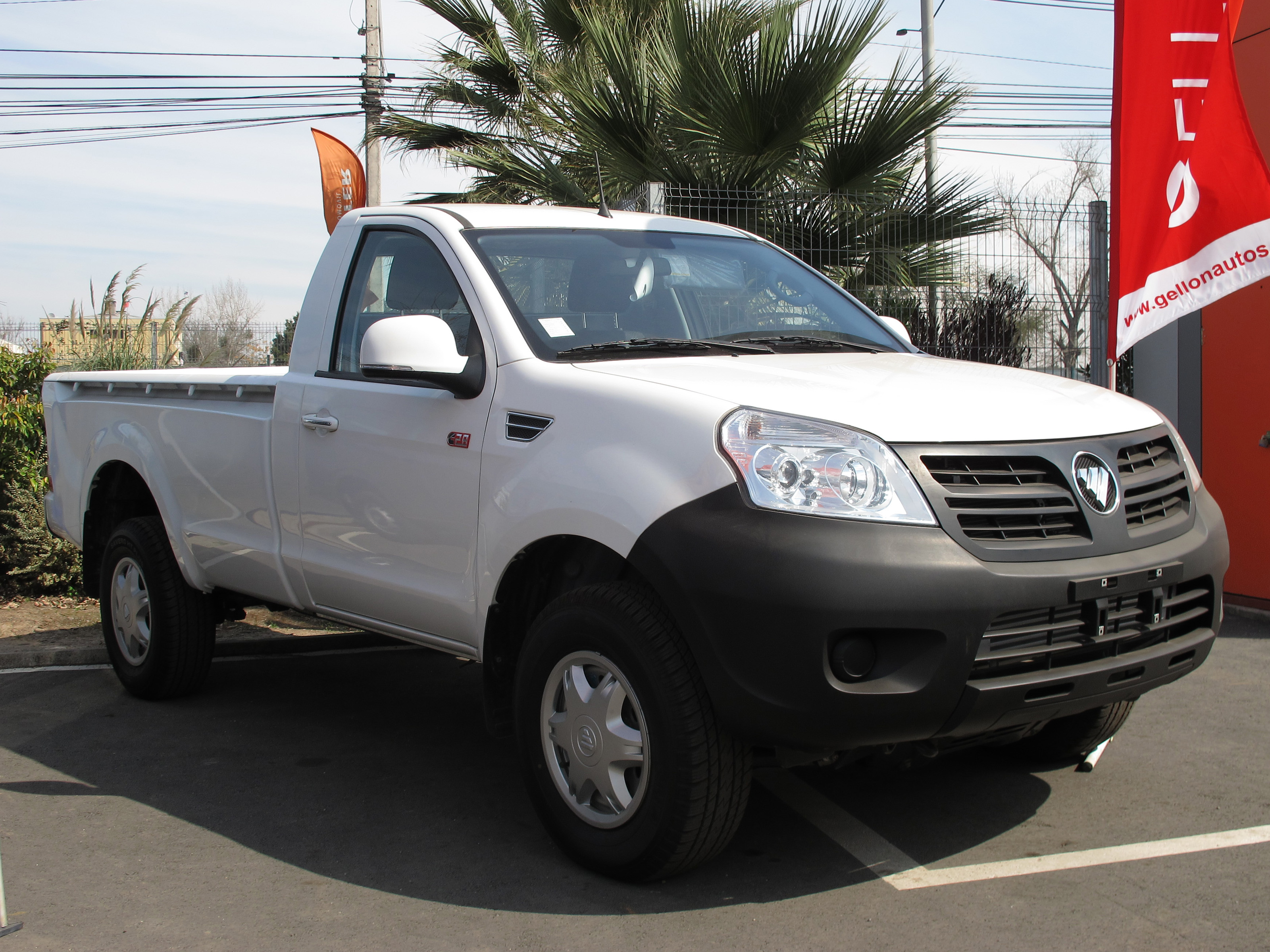
Foton Terracota ST in Chile

== 2018 Facelift ==
The 2018 facelifts of the Tunland E5 and Tunland E7 were released in China at the 2018 Beijing Auto Show. The 2018 Tunland facelift is available in both standard and extended versions. The body dimensions are 5,310 mm × 1,880 mm × 1,860 mm (209 by 74 by 73 inches) and 5,603 mm × 1,880 mm × 1,860 mm (221 by 74 by 73 inches), with the wheelbases of 3,105 and 3,398 mm (122 and 134 inches), respectively.

== Tunland Shengtu 5 and Shengtu 7 (2019) ==
The Tunland Shengtu 5 and Shengtu 7 are updated variants of the Tunland that were launched in December 2019 alongside the Tunland Yutu pickups. The Shengtu 5 and Shengtu 7 variants are available with a 2.0-liter (120 cu in) turbo diesel engine, and have a maximum output of 120 kW (160 hp) and 390 N⋅m (290 lb⋅ft) mated to a 6-speed manual transmission.

== Tunland/Mars 7 and 9 (2023) ==
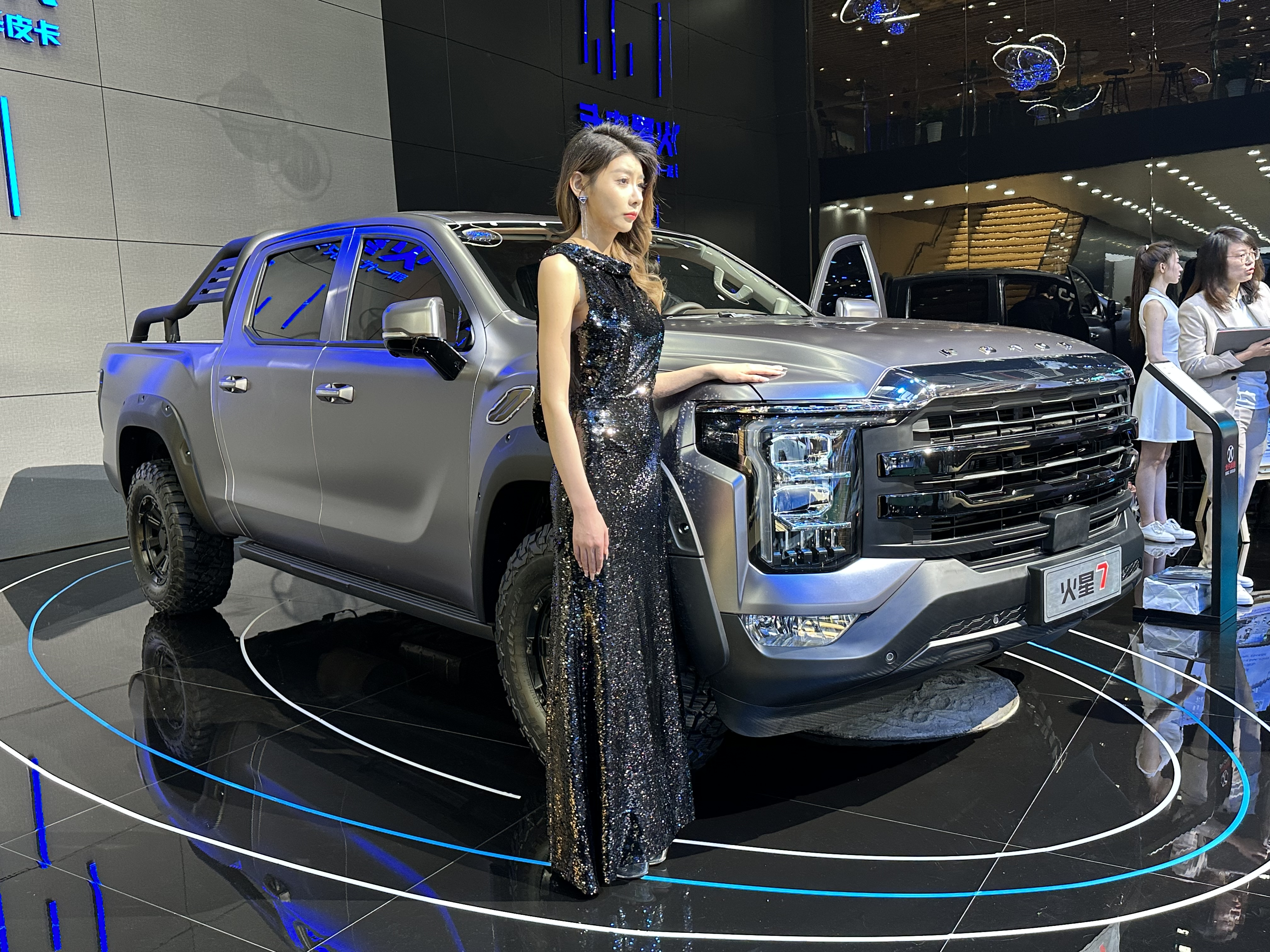
Foton Mars 7 at 2023 Auto Shanghai

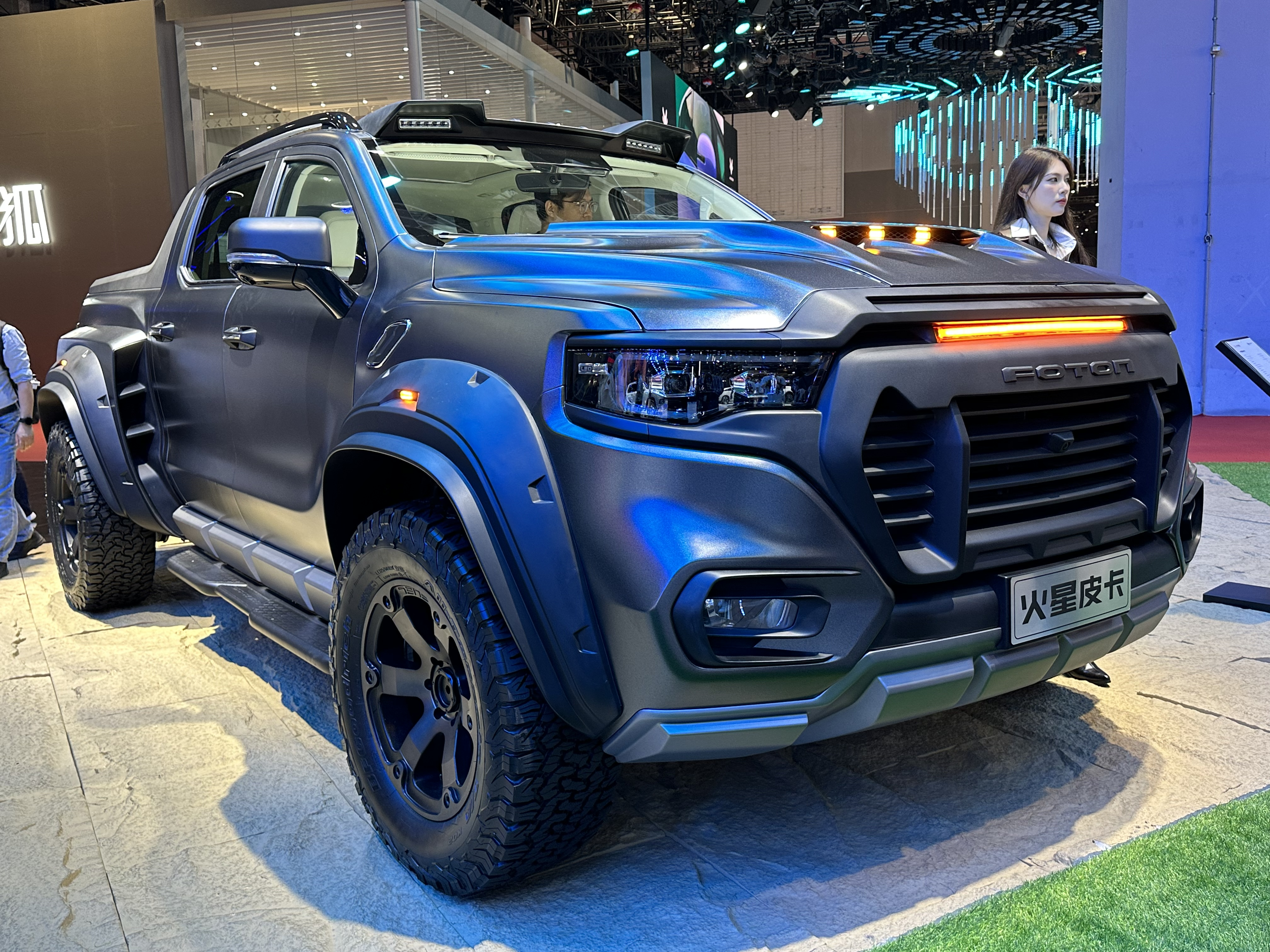
Foton Mars 9

The Foton full-size pickup truck sold as the Mars 7 and Mars 9 in China, was sold as the Tunland 7 and Tunland 9 outside of China.

The Mars 7 is larger in all dimensions than Mars 9. The Mars 7 has a length of 5,797 mm (228 inches), a width of 2,090 mm (82 inches), and a wheelbase of 3,505 mm (138 inches), while the Mars 9 has a length of 5,617 mm (221 inches), a width of 2,000 mm (79 inches), and a wheelbase of 3,355 mm (132 inches). The powertrain of the Mars series is a 2.5-liter (150 cu in) turbo diesel engine with 450 N⋅m (330 lbf⋅ft) of torque. An optional 284 kW (381 hp) mild hybrid system with a 48 V starter-alternator and 8-speed ZF automatic transmission is also available, as well as a PHEV powertrain.

In 2024, both models were introduced to the Cambodian market by GTV Motor Cambodia, rebadged as the GTV Kouprey (Tunland V7) and GTV Kouprey Pro (Tunland V9). The Kouprey is powered by a 2.0‑litre Aucan turbo‑diesel engine producing 122 kW (163 hp) and 390 N⋅m (288 lb⋅ft), paired with a 6‑speed manual or 8‑speed automatic transmission, and features a leaf‑spring rear suspension for load‑carrying capability. The Kouprey Pro uses the same engine but adds a coil‑spring rear suspension for improved ride comfort, The drive type is four-wheel drive.along with premium features such as a panoramic sunroof, leather upholstery, a 12.3‑inch infotainment display, and advanced driver‑assistance systems. At launch, Cambodian pricing started at US$31,999 for the Kouprey and US$38,999 for the Kouprey Pro, with higher trims and export versions priced above US$40,000.

== Safety ==
ANCAP test results Foton Tunland (2012)
Test	Score
Overall	3 /5 stars
Frontal offset	8/16
Side impact	16/16
Pole	Not Assessed
Seat belt reminders	0/3
Whiplash protection	Not Assessed
Pedestrian protection	Not Assessed
Electronic stability control	Not Available

== Sales ==
Year	Thailand	
2018	62	
2019	39	
Year	Australia	
Year	V7	V9
2025	67	110
