= Foton Gratour im6 =

Chinese mini MPV

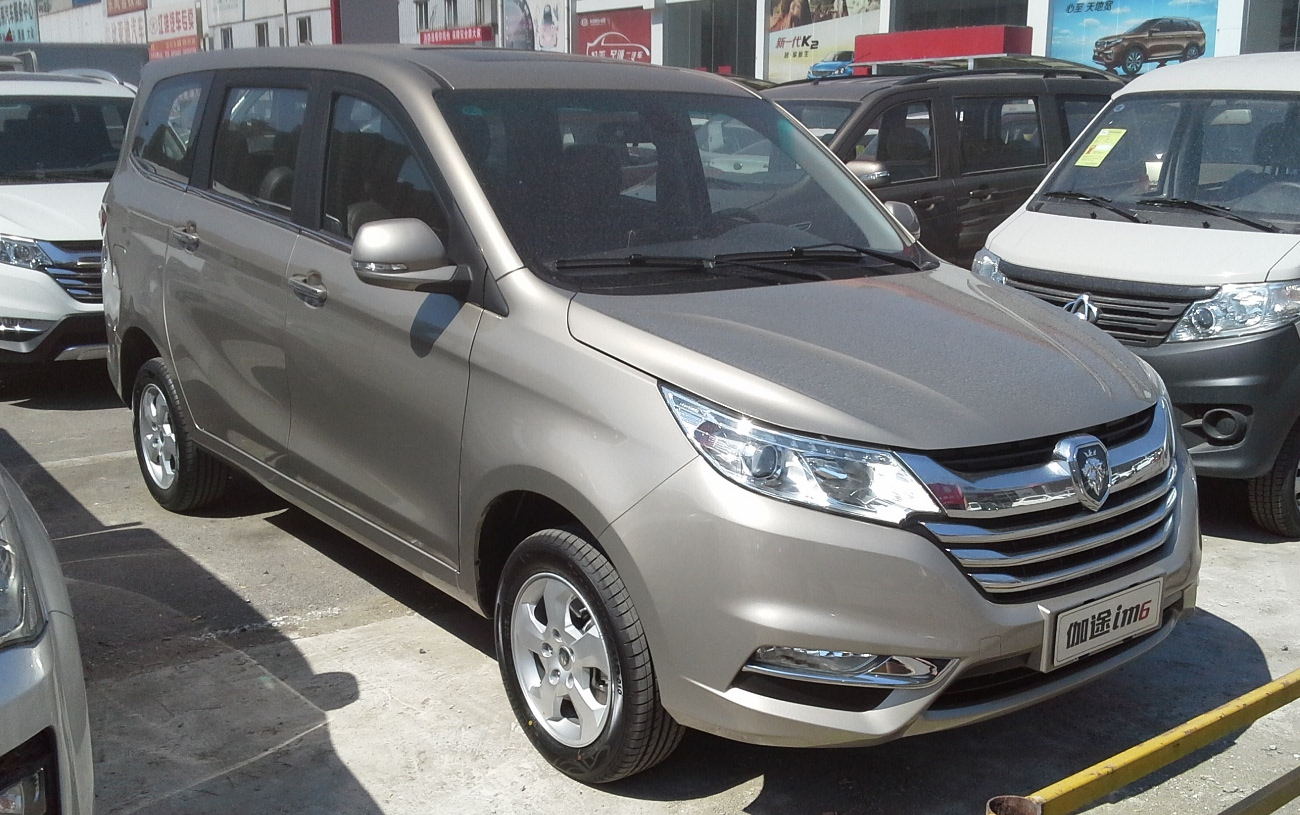

Overview
- Manufacturer: Foton
- Production: 2017–2019
- Model years: 2017–2018

Body and chassis
- Class: MPV
- Body style: 5-door station wagon
- Layout: FF

Powertrain
- Engine: 1.5L 'I4
- Transmission: 5-speed manual

Dimensions
- Wheelbase: 2,760 mm (108.7 in)
- Length: 4,700 mm (185.0 in)(im6); 4,730 mm (186.2 in)(im8)
- Width: 1,780 mm (70.1 in)(im6); 1,810 mm (71.3 in)(im8)
- Height: 1,820 mm (71.7 in)(im6); 1,830 mm (72.0 in)(im8)

The Foton Gratour im6 (Chinese: 伽途im6) is a mini MPV produced by Foton, a subsidiary of BAIC Group.

== Overview ==
The Gratour im6 was sold under the Gratour compact MPV product series with prices ranging from 61,900 yuan to 72,900 yuan. Styling is controversial as the front and rear end designs heavily resembles the fifth generation Honda Odyssey.

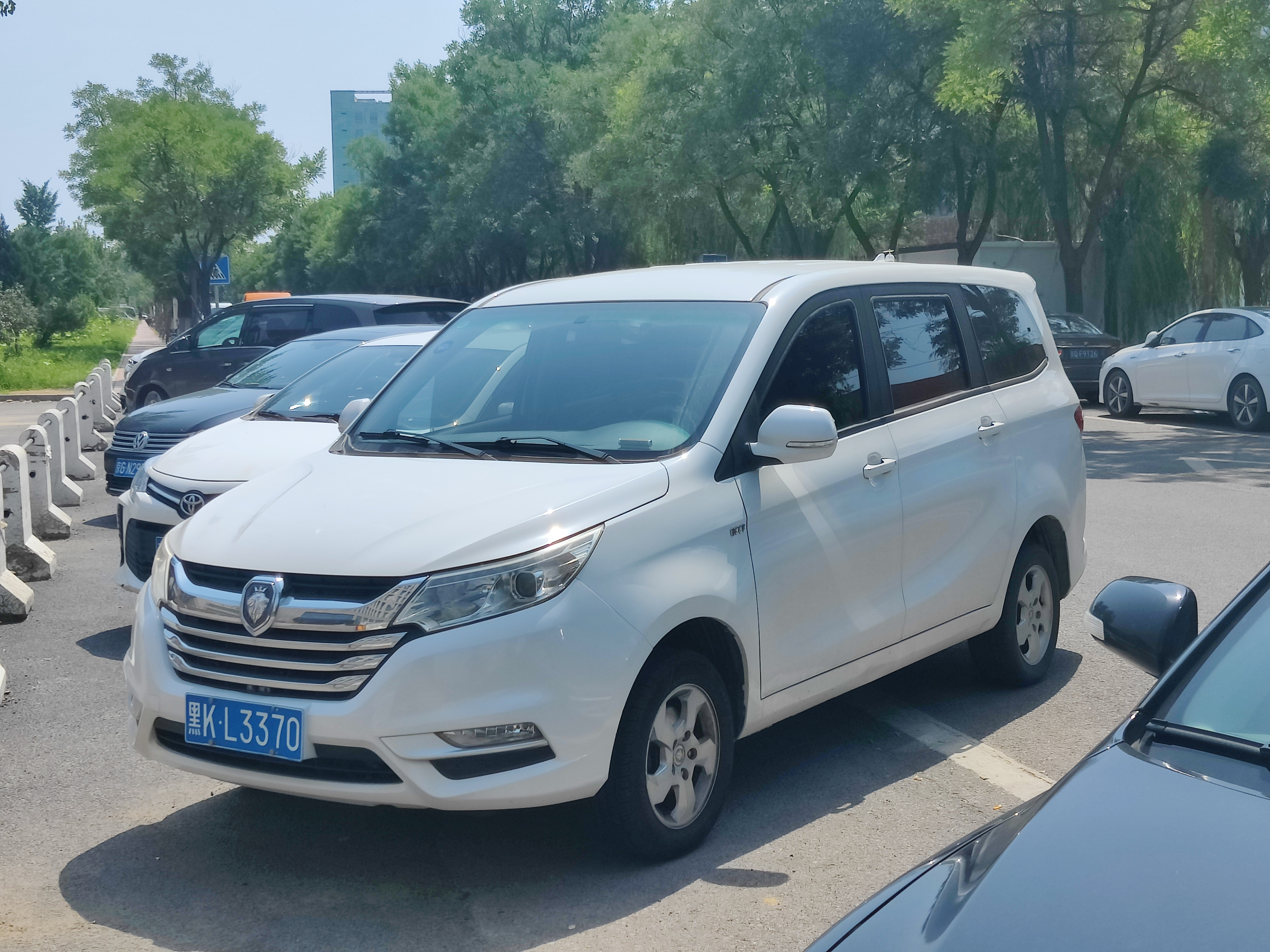
Gratour im6

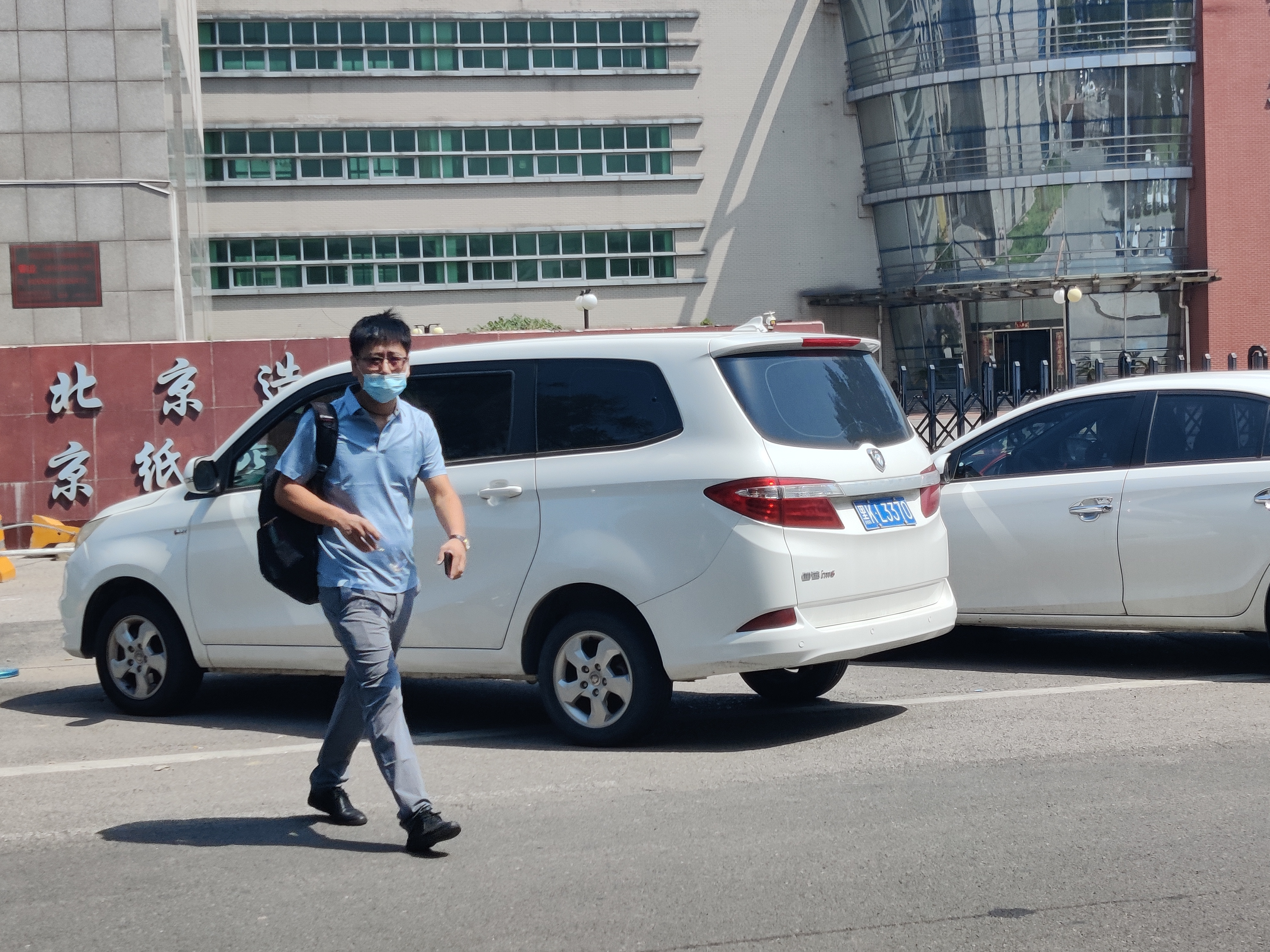
Rear view

== Foton Gratour im8 ==
The Foton Gratour im8 (伽途im8) is essentially the im6 with more ground clearance, extra plastic claddings and positioned higher in the market. Prices of the Gratour im8 ranges from 70,900 yuan to 79,900 yuan. A higher trim level called the Foton Gratour GT was also based on the Gratour im8 featuring a duo-colored paint job, and a price range from 79,900 yuan to 136,800 yuan.

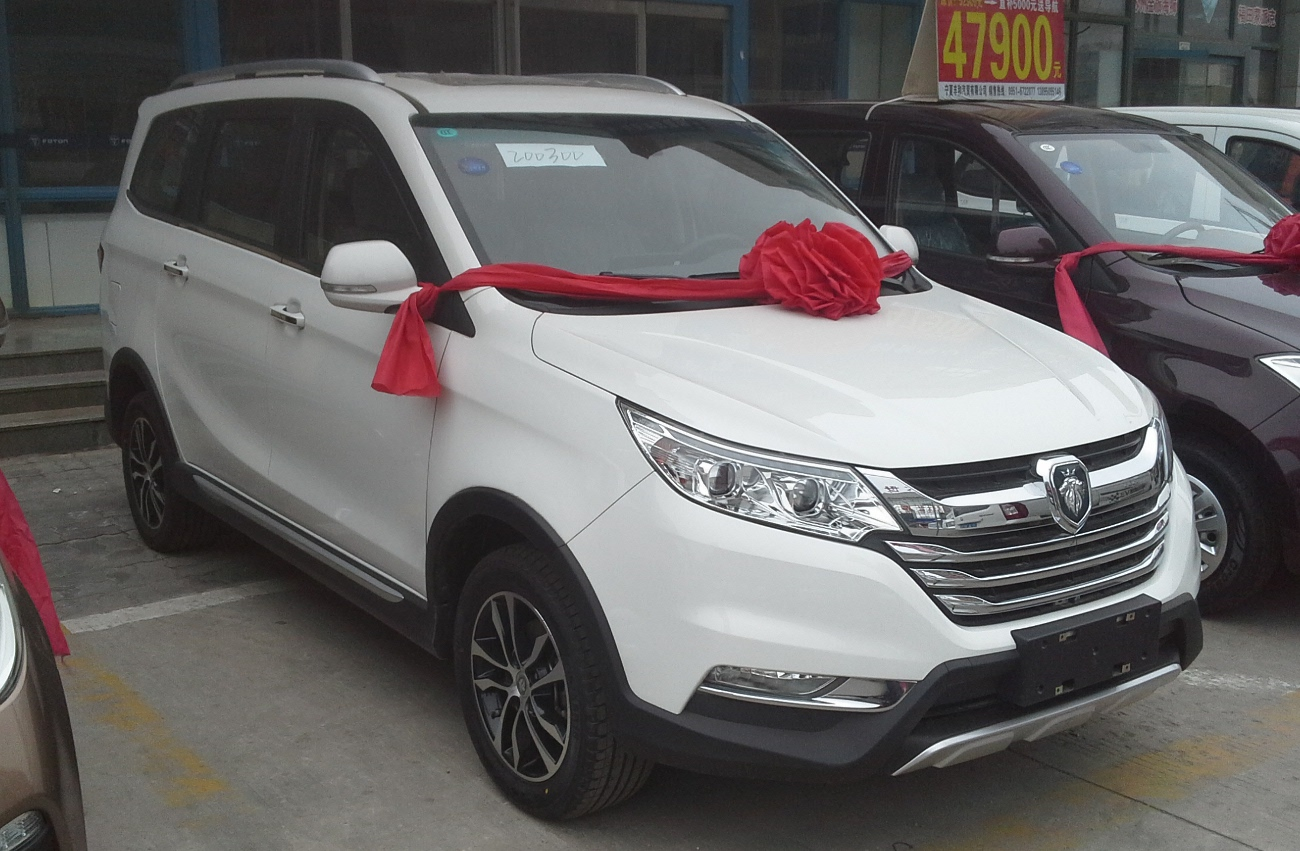
Gratour im8

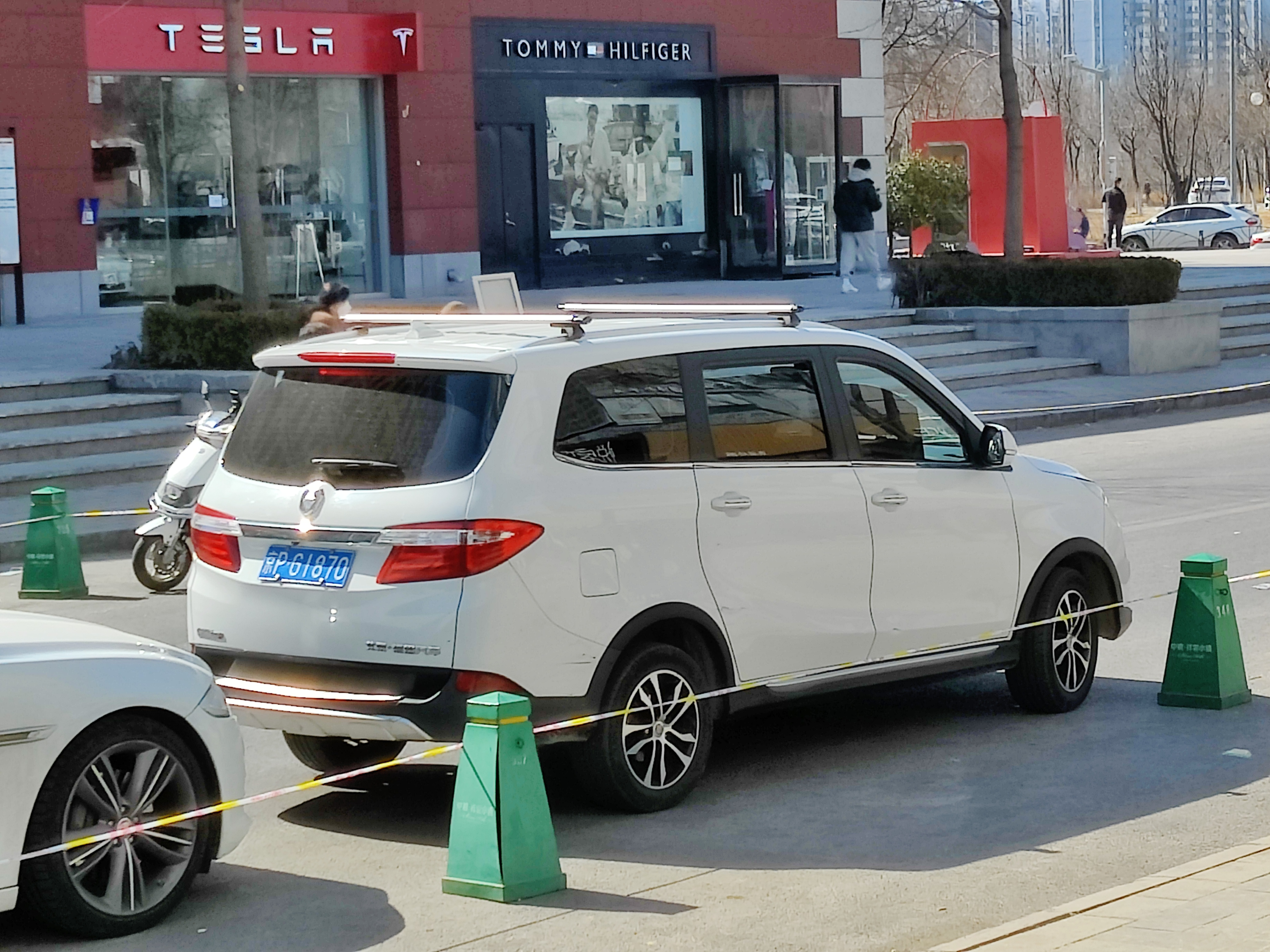
Rear view

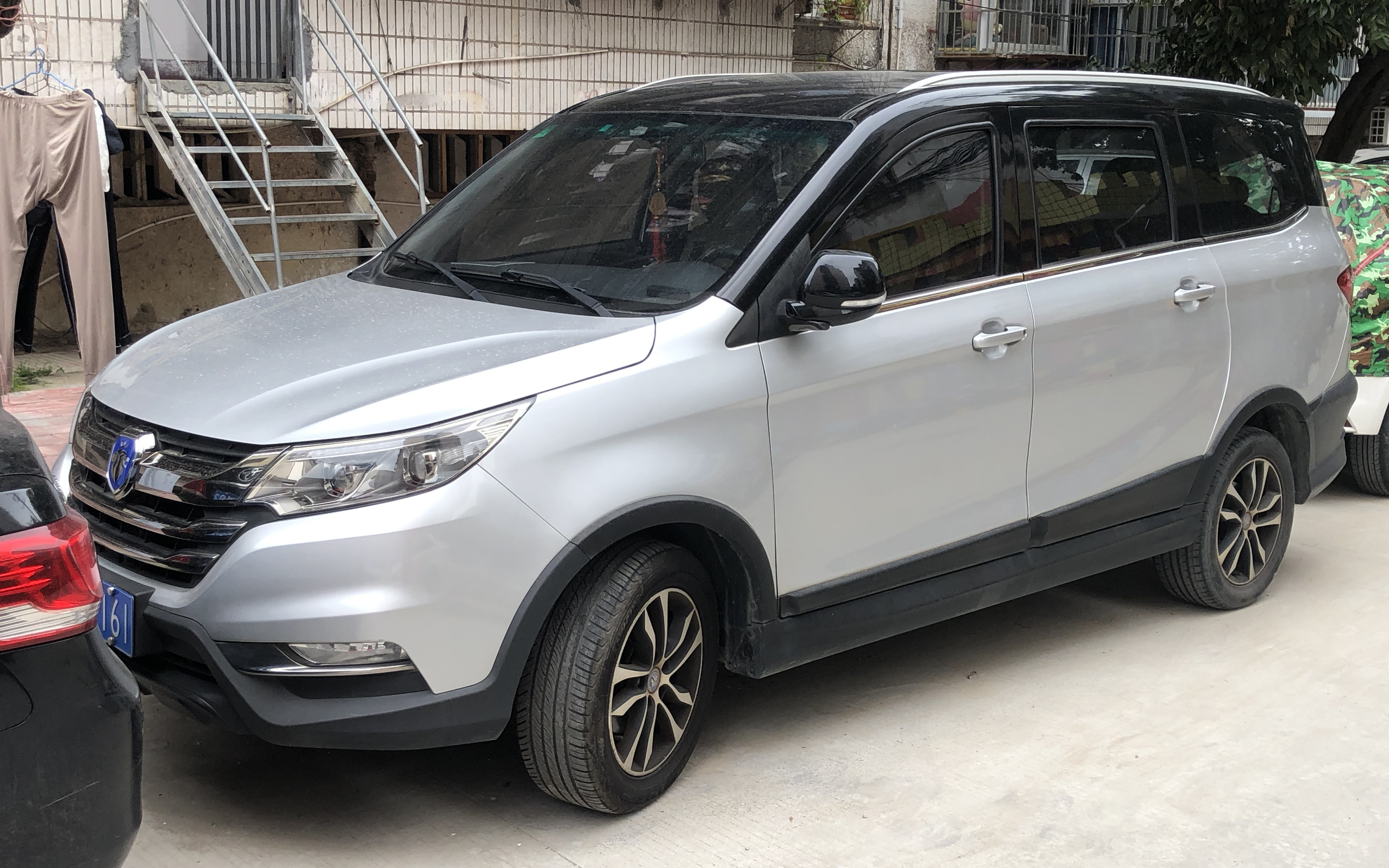
Gratour GT

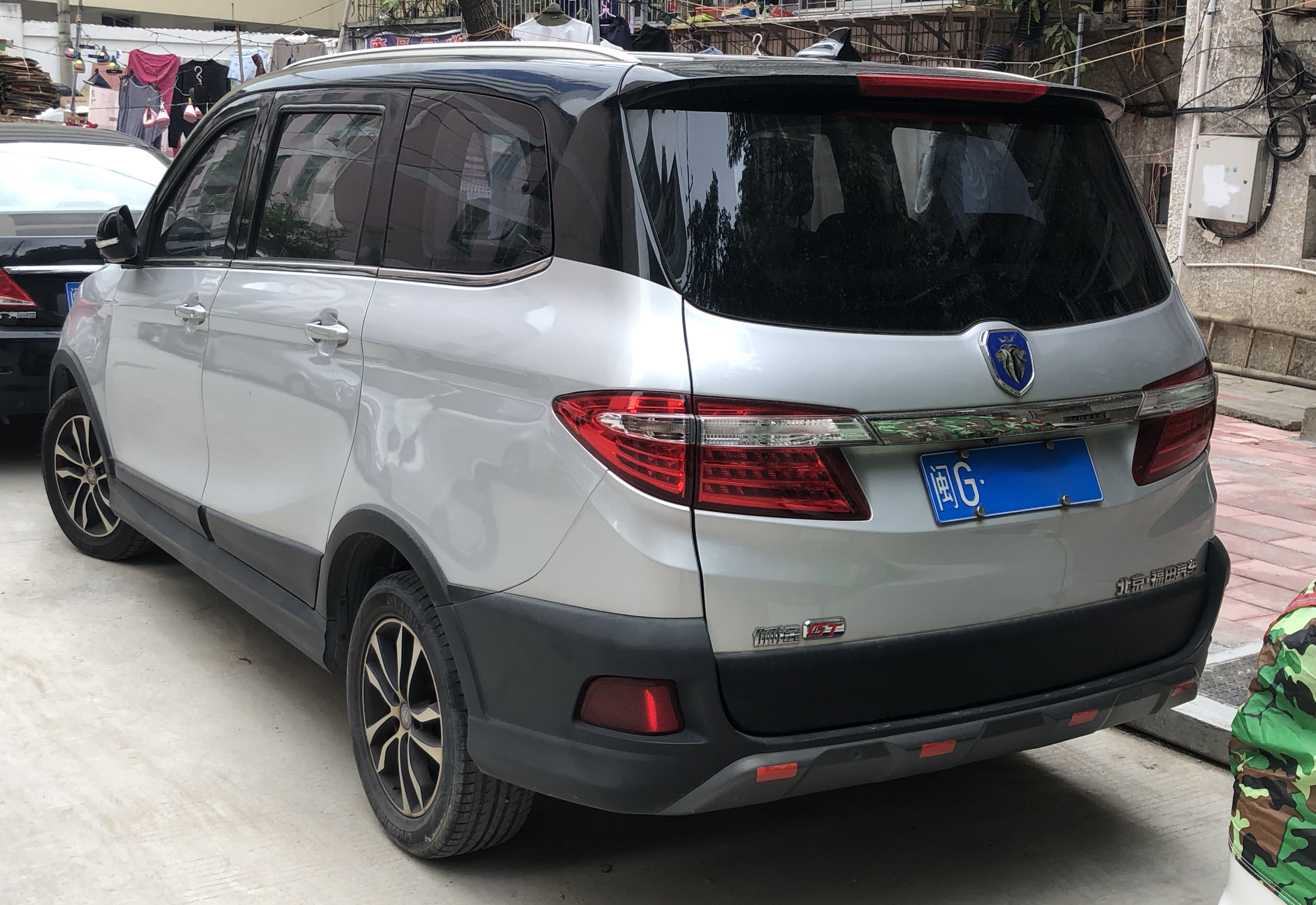
Rear view
