= Foton Gratour ix5 =

Chinese mini MPV

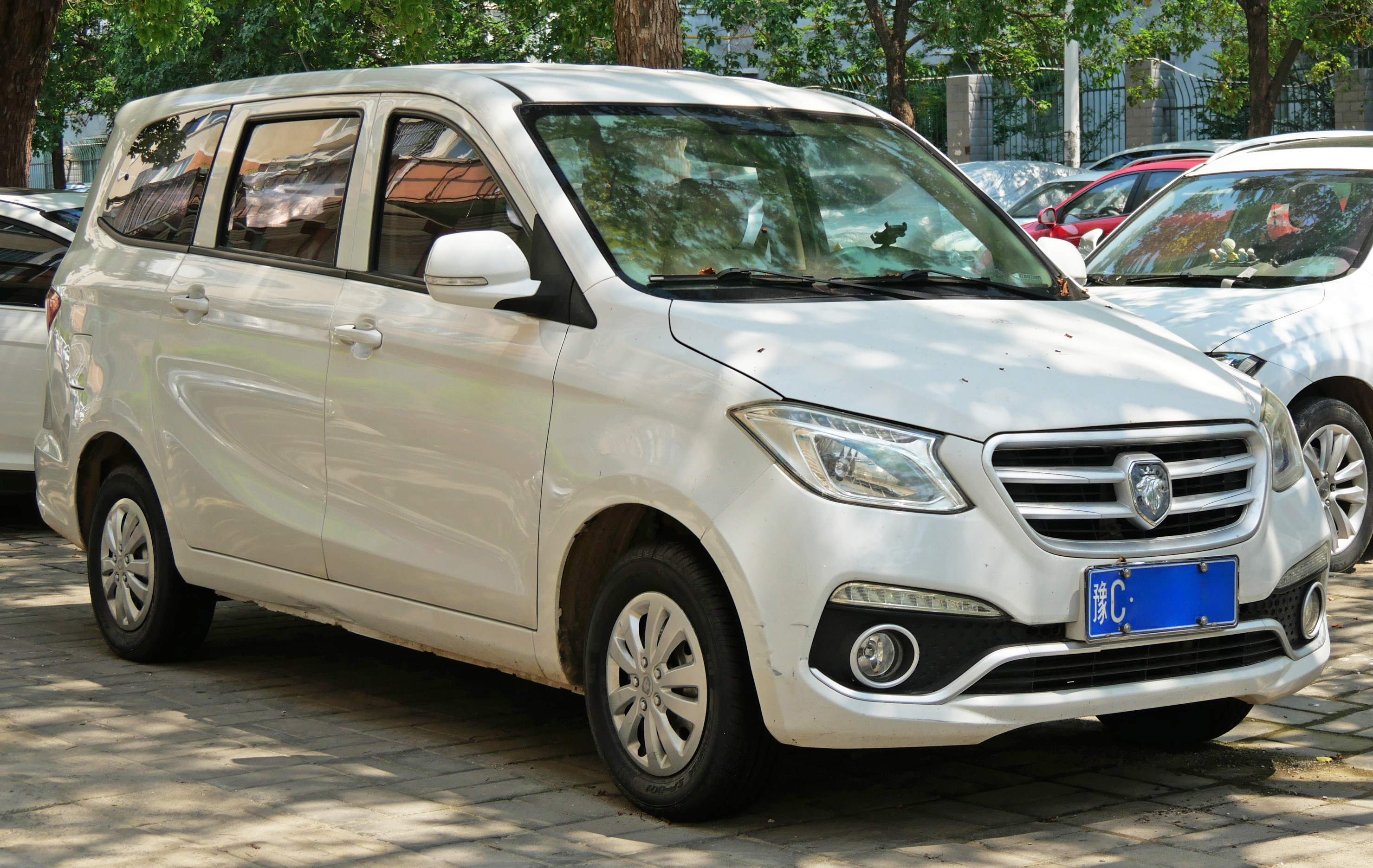

Overview
- Manufacturer: Foton
- Production: 2016–2017
- Model years: 2016

Body and chassis
- Class: MPV
- Body style: 5-door station wagon
- Layout: FF

Powertrain
- Engine: 1.2L 'I4; 1.5L 'I4
- Transmission: 5-speed manual

Dimensions
- Wheelbase: 2,760 mm (108.7 in)
- Length: 4,505 mm (177.4 in)(ix5); 4,515 mm (177.8 in)(ix7)
- Width: 1,725 mm (67.9 in)(ix5); 1,750 mm (68.9 in)(ix7)
- Height: 1,770 mm (69.7 in)(ix5); 1,820 mm (71.7 in)(ix7)

The Foton Gratour ix5 (Chinese: 伽途ix5) is a mini MPV produced by Foton, a subsidiary of BAIC Group.

== Overview ==
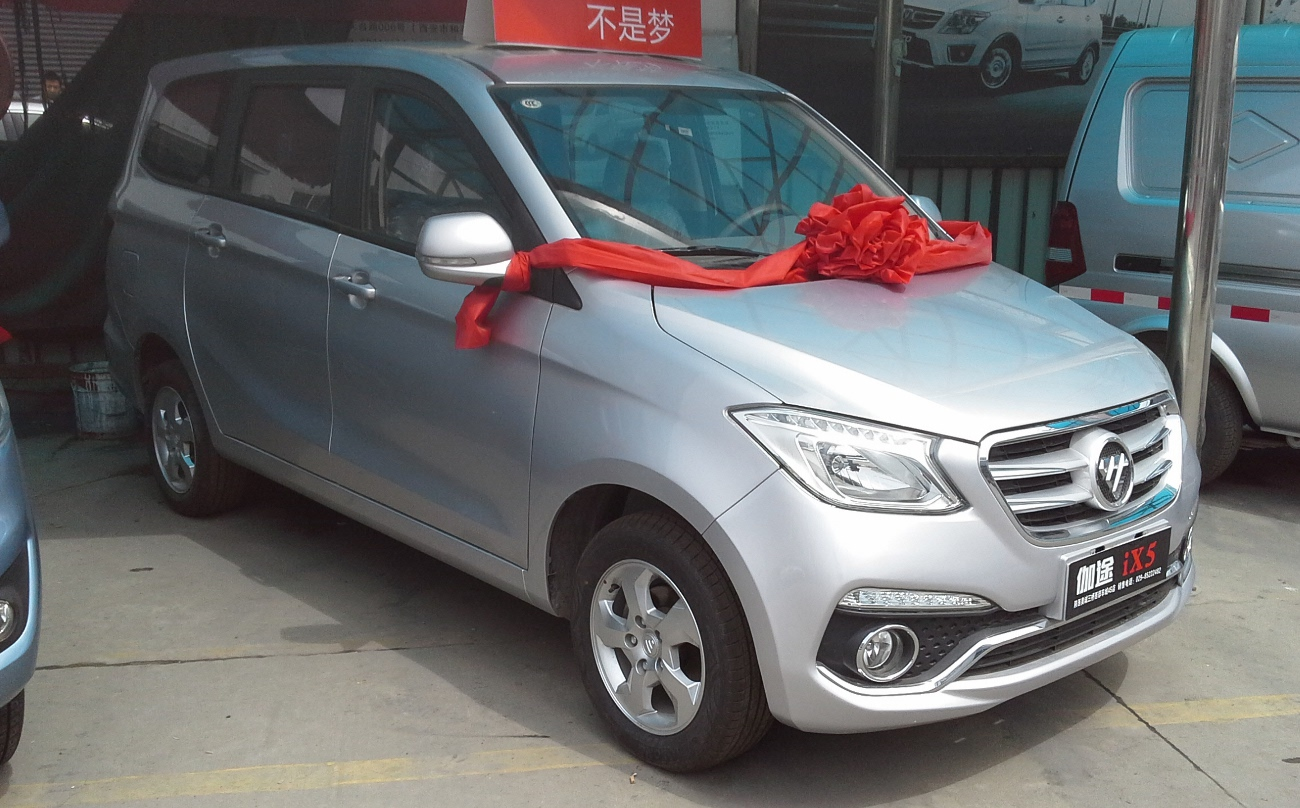
Foton branded Gratour ix5 (2016)

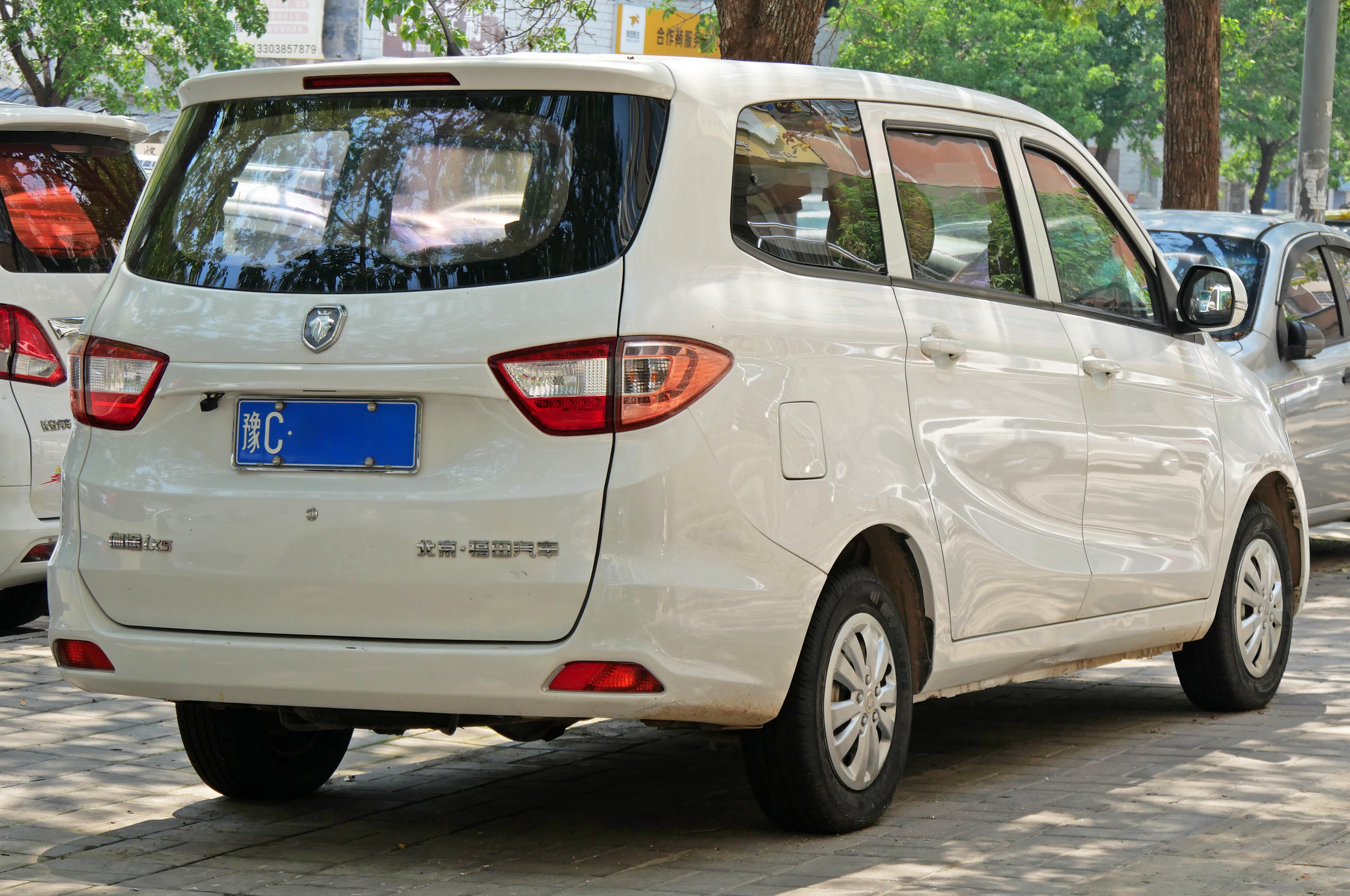
Rear view of the Gratour ix5

The Gratour ix5 was sold under the Gratour compact MPV product series with prices ranging from 41,900 yuan to 58,900 yuan.

The Foton Gratour ix5 was powered by a 1.2 liter inline-4 engine producing 66 kW (88 hp) or a 1.5 liter inline-4 engine producing 87 kW (116 hp), with both engines mated to a 5-speed manual gear box.

== Foton Gratour ix7 ==
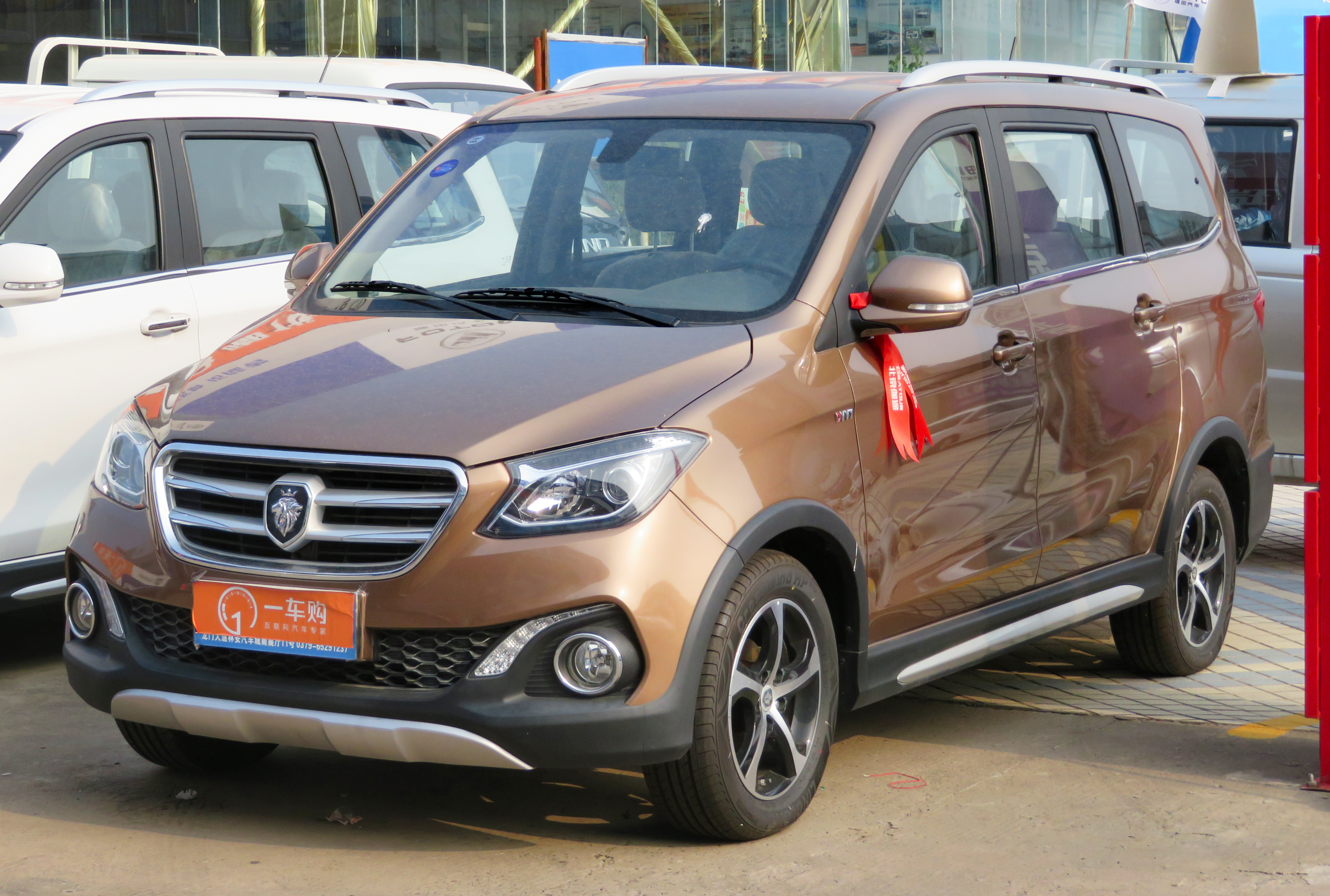
Foton Gratour ix7

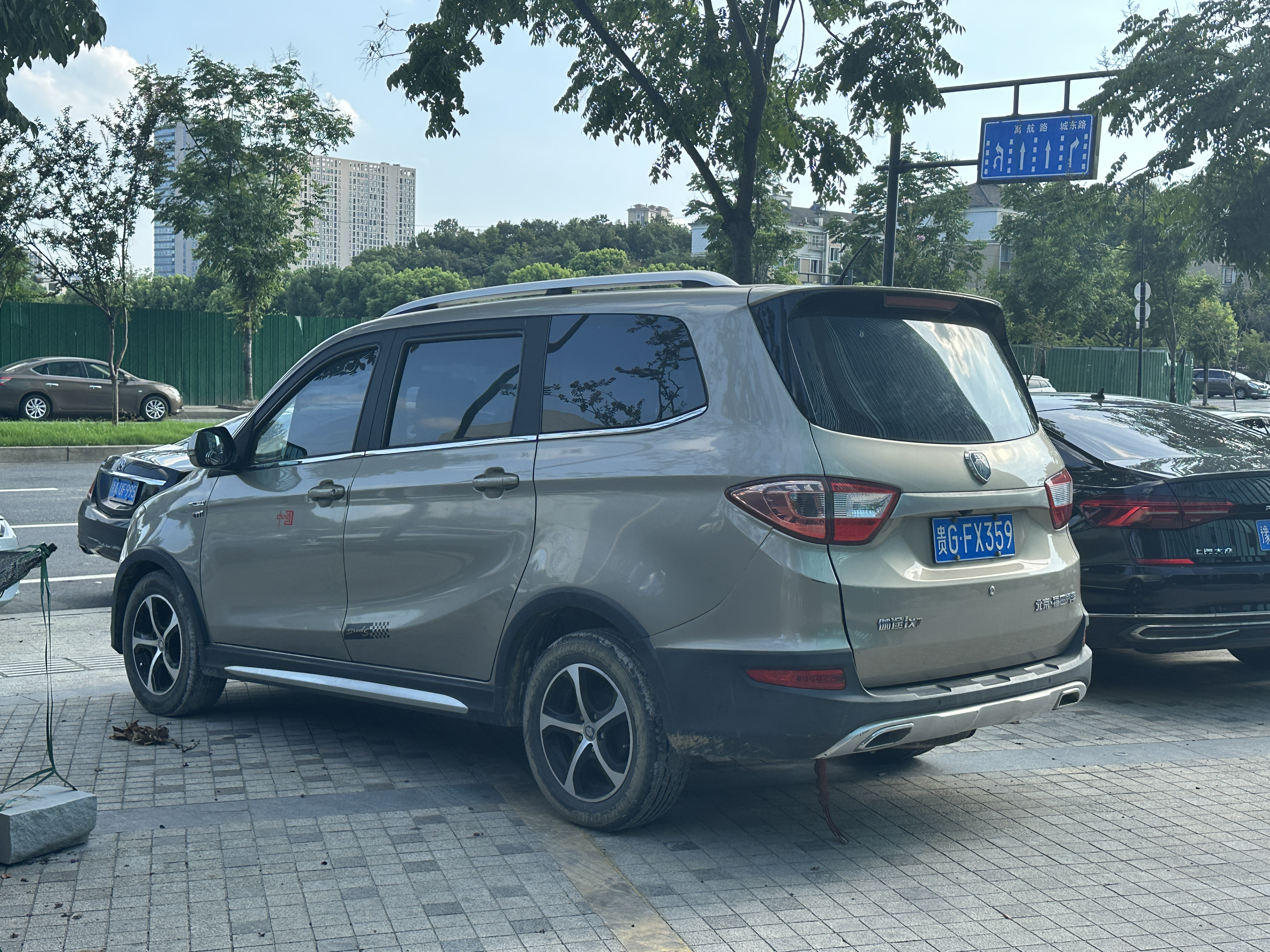
Foton Gratour ix7 rear

The Foton Gratour ix7 (伽途ix7) is essentially the Gratour ix5 with more ground clearance, extra plastic claddings and positioned higher in the market. Prices of the Gratour ix7 ranges from 53,900 yuan to 69,900 yuan.

The Foton Gratour ix7 was powered by the 1.5 liter inline-4 engine producing 87 kW (116 hp) from the Gratour ix5 mated to a 5-speed manual gear box.
