= Huasong 7 =

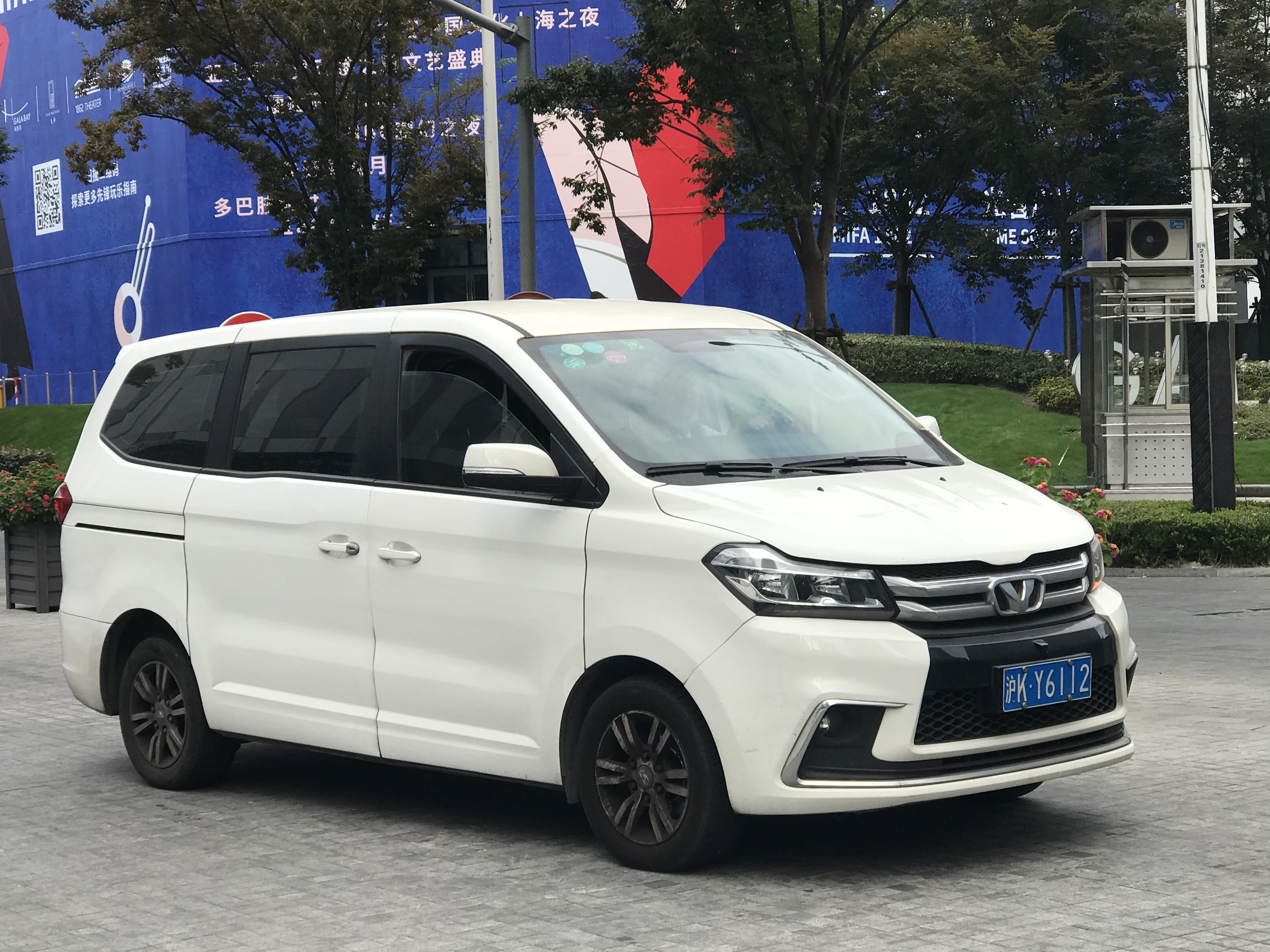

Overview
- Manufacturer: Brilliance Auto
- Production: 2014–2020
- Assembly: China

Body and chassis
- Class: Full-size MPV
- Body style: 5-door minivan
- Layout: Front-engine, rear-wheel-drive

Powertrain
- Engine: N20B20C 2.0 L four-cylinder petrol engine
- Transmission: 6-speed automatic

Dimensions
- Wheelbase: 2,990 mm (118 in)
- Length: 5,005 mm (197.0 in)
- Width: 1,909 mm (75.2 in)
- Height: 1,935 mm (76.2 in)
- Curb weight: 2,030 kg (4,480 lb)

The Huasong 7 is a large MPV produced by Brilliance Auto under the sub-brand Huasong with a 2+2+3 7-seat configuration.

== Overview ==
The Huasong 7 is Huasong's first product, and Huasong vehicles will all be based on existing minivan platforms from Jinbei, which is another sub-brand of Brilliance Automotive. The Huasong 7 debuted on the 2014 Guangzhou Auto Show and was launched on the China car market before the end of 2014.

A facelift version of the Huasong 7 MPV was introduced in 2018 featuring a restyled front bumper integrating a dark mask in the front DRG.

=== Gallery ===
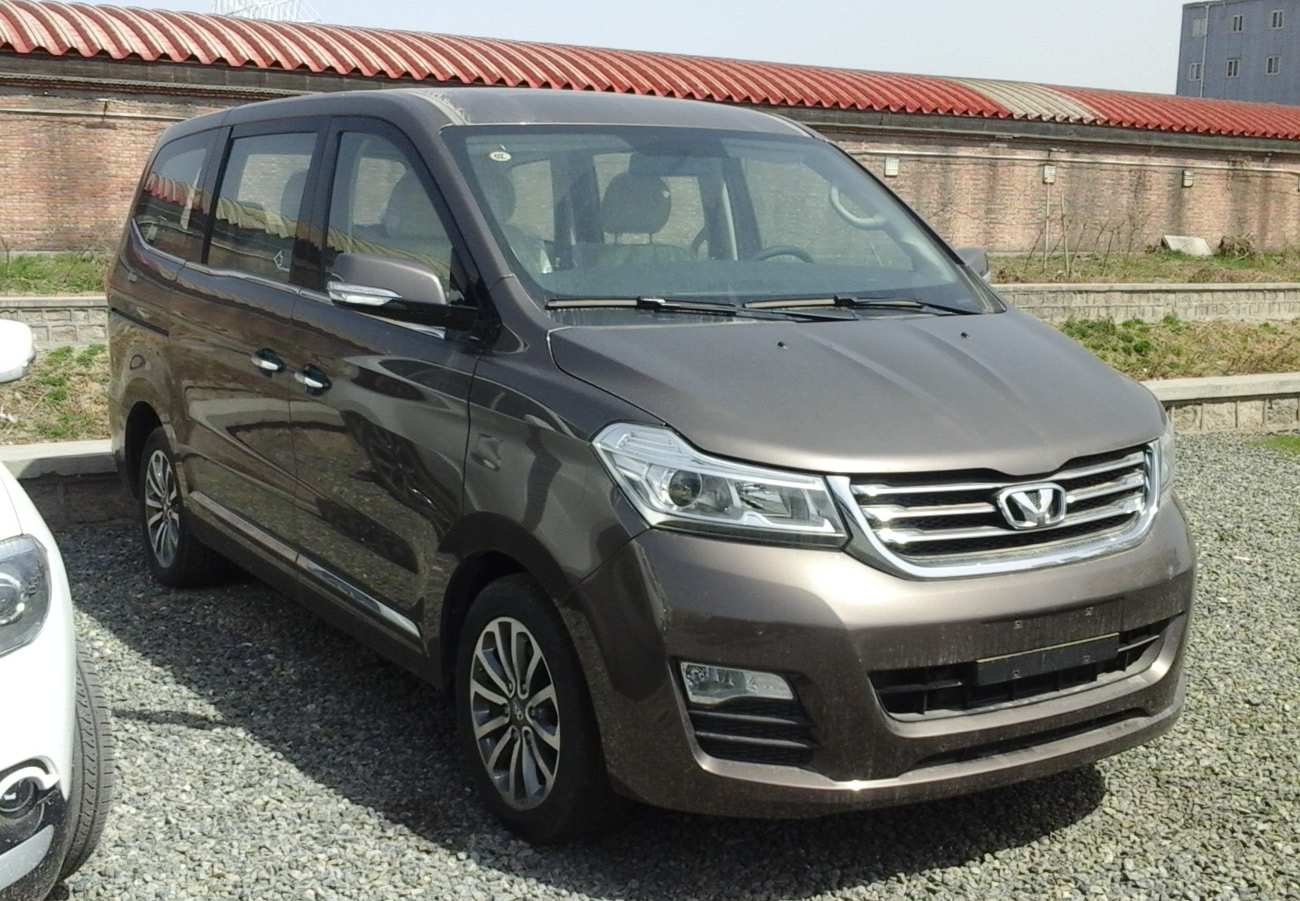
Huasong 7 pre-facelift front view

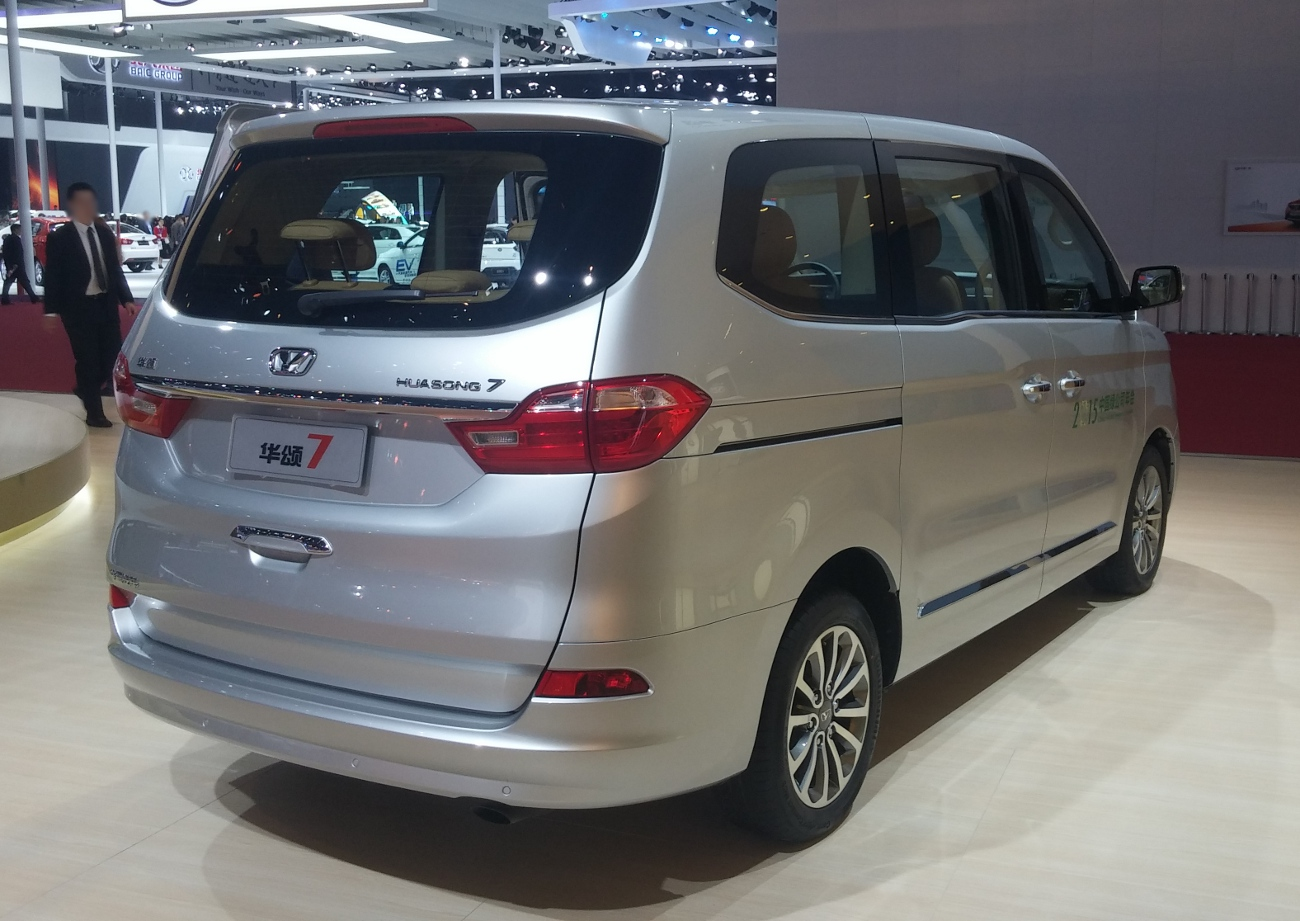
Huasong 7 pre-facelift rear view

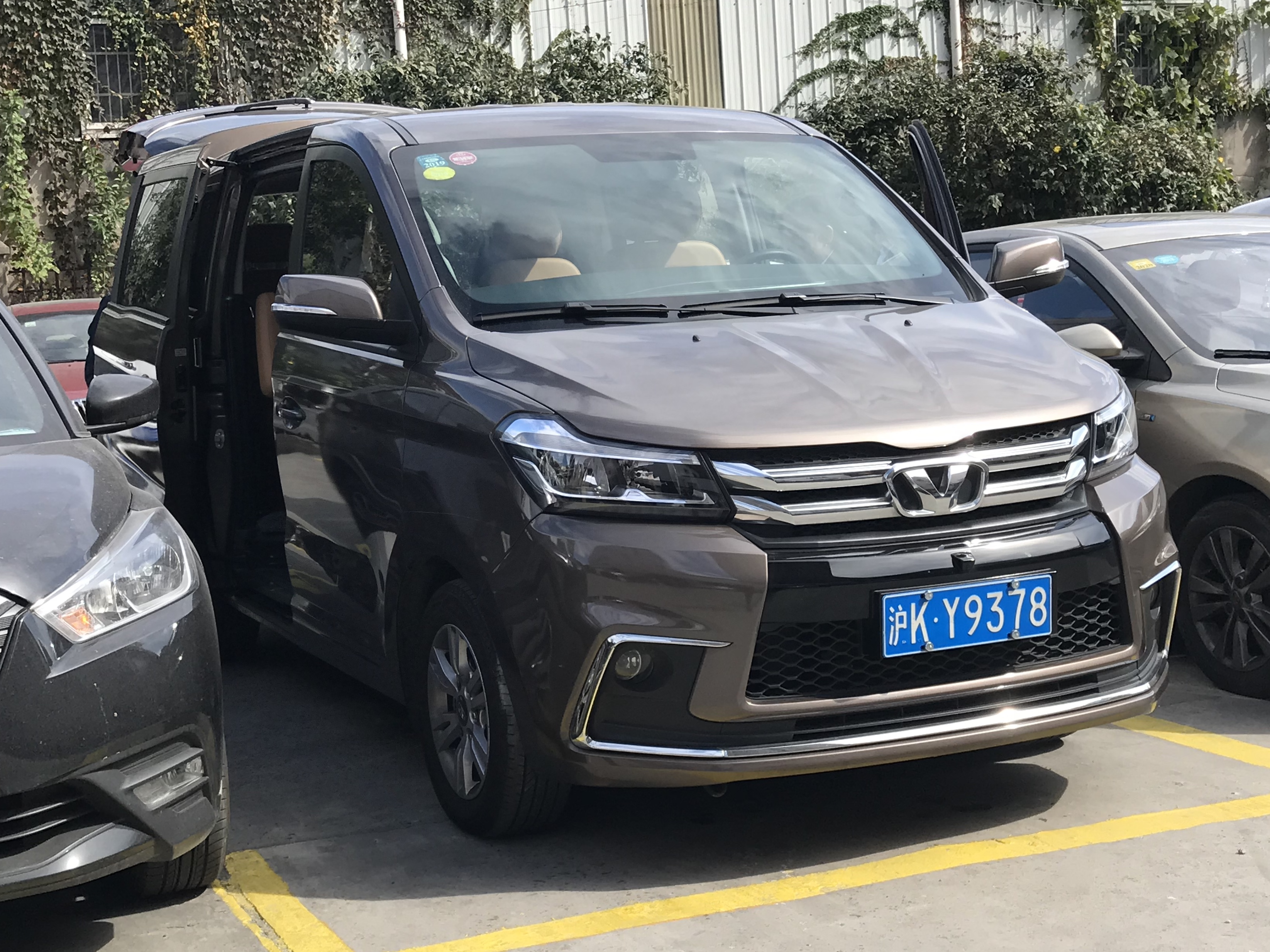
2018 Huasong 7 facelift

== See also ==
- Jinbei (marque)
