= Farizon SV =

Battery electric van

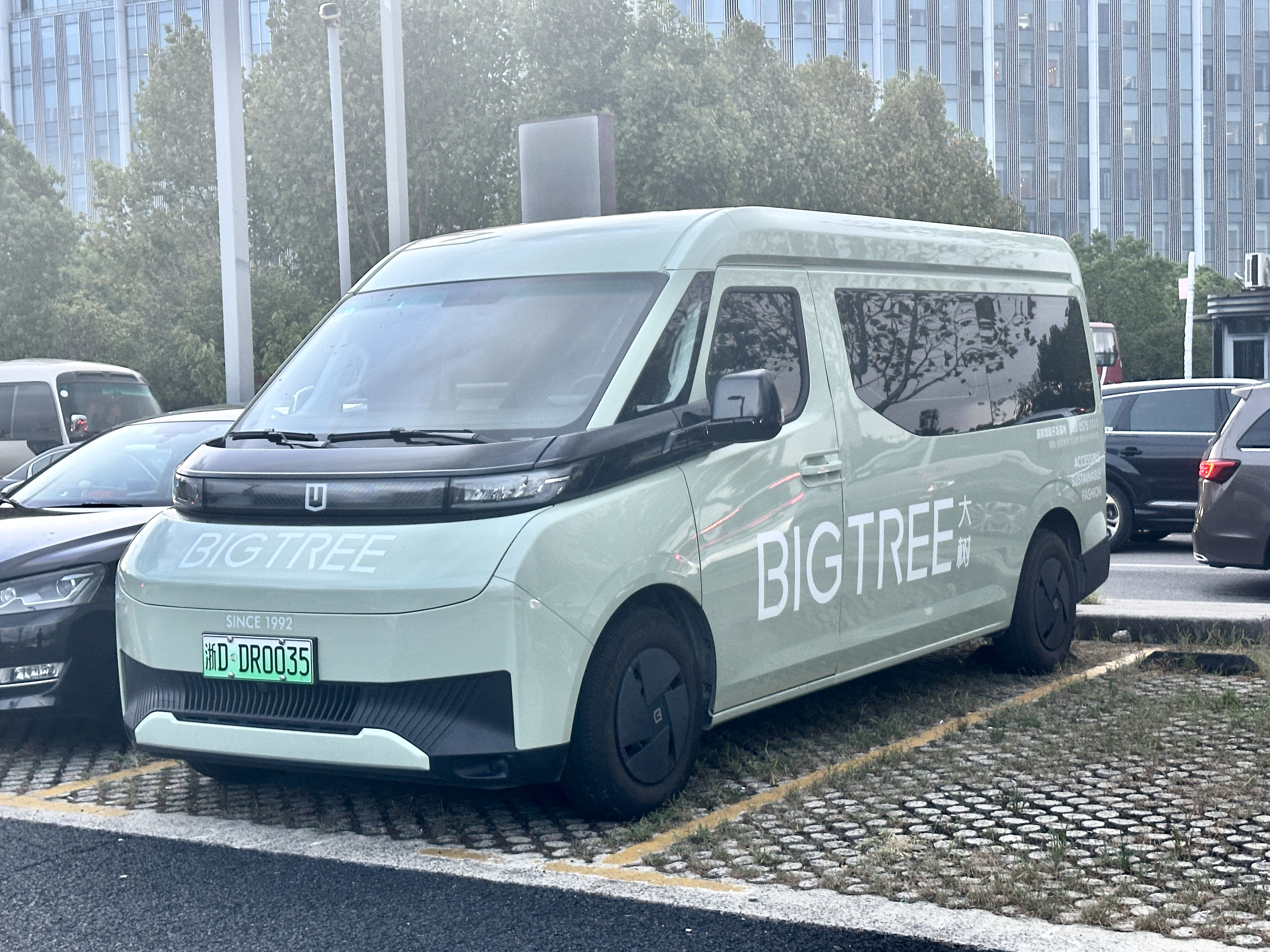
- Farizon SV (LWB)

Overview
- Manufacturer: Farizon Auto
- Also called: Farizon Xingfuhao (远程吉利幸福号); Jinbei Jiyun E9; Jinbei Quick Transport E9 (金杯吉运E9)
- Production: 2024–present
- Assembly: China

Body and chassis
- Class: Light commercial vehicle
- Body style: 4-door van
- Layout: Front-motor, front-wheel-drive
- Platform: GMA architecture (GXA-M platform)

Powertrain
- Electric motor: Permanent magnet synchronous
- Power output: 169 kW (227 hp; 230 PS)
- Battery: 67 kWh Aegis Short Blade LFP; 83 kWh Aegis Short Blade LFP; 106 kWh NMC
- Range: Maximum 558 km (347 mi) (WLTP)

Dimensions
- Wheelbase: 3,100 mm (122.0 in) (L1H1 & L1H2); 3,600 mm (141.7 in) (L2H2 & L2H3); 3,850 mm (151.6 in) (L3H3)
- Length: 4,990 mm (196.5 in) (L1H1 & L1H2); 5,490 mm (216.1 in) (L2H2 & L2H3); 5,995 mm (236.0 in) (L3H3)
- Width: 1,980 mm (78.0 in)
- Height: 1,980 mm (78.0 in) (L1H1); 2,180 mm (85.8 in) (L1H2 & L2H2); 2,500 mm (98.4 in) (L2H3 & L3H3)
- Curb weight: 3,500 kg (7,716 lb)

The Farizon SV (Supervan) is a battery electric van produced by the Chinese automaker Farizon from 2024.

== Overview ==
The Farizon SV was developed as a dedicated electric van rather than a conversion of an existing internal combustion platform, a design approach increasingly adopted by manufacturers entering the electric commercial vehicle sector.

The SV is built on a dedicated electric vehicle platform designed to accommodate multiple body configurations and battery sizes. Unlike many early electric vans derived from diesel models, the SV integrates drive-by-wire steering and braking systems intended to reduce mechanical complexity and support advanced driver-assistance technologies.

The SV targets both medium- and large-sized van segments through a modular body structure offering several lengths and roof heights. Passenger-oriented derivatives of the SV platform have been developed to support applications such as multi-purpose vehicles, shuttle transport, and camper conversions. All variants share the same platform and powertrain architecture while the passenger variants can incorporate seating configurations for up to seven passengers.

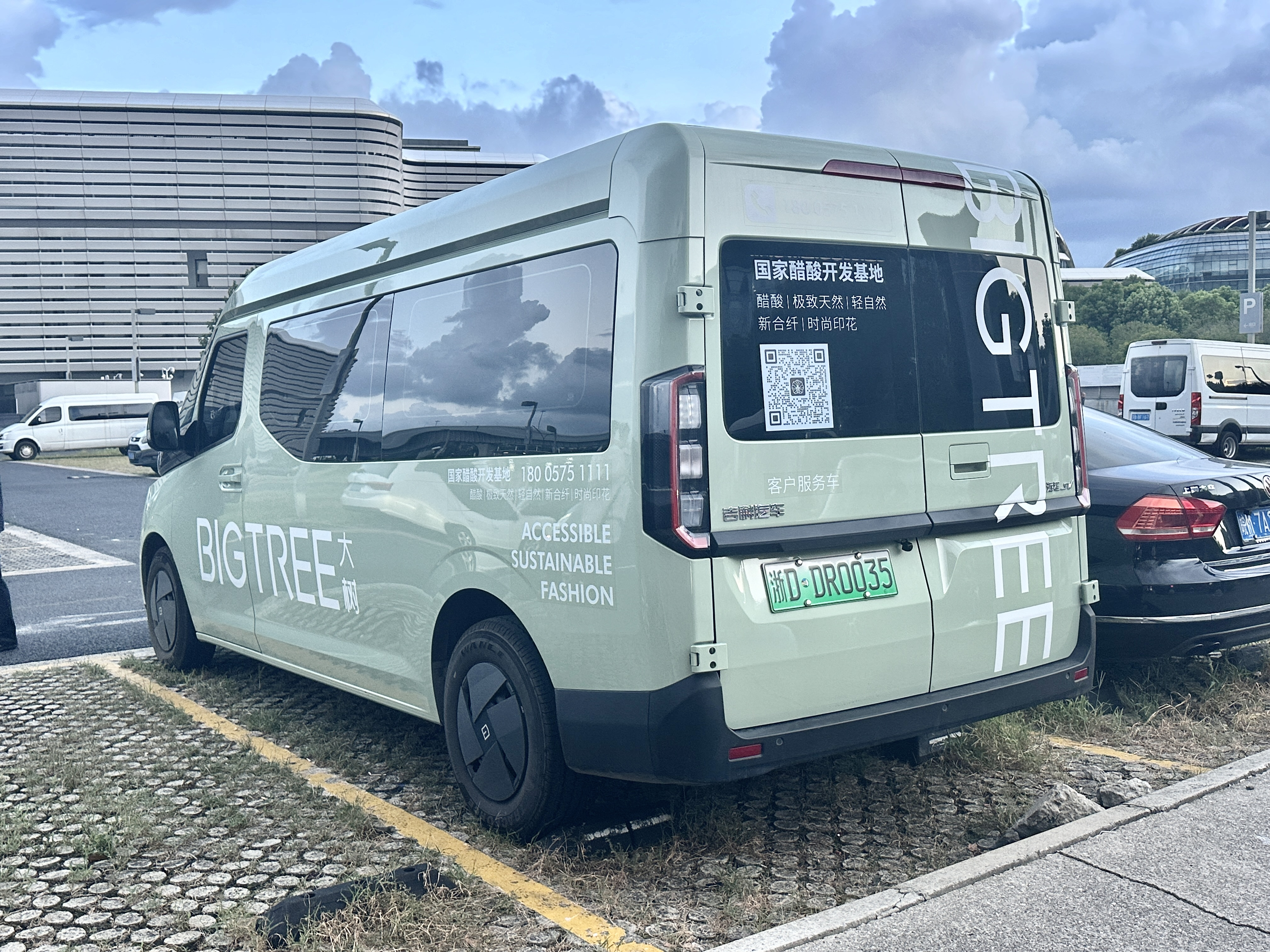
Rear view

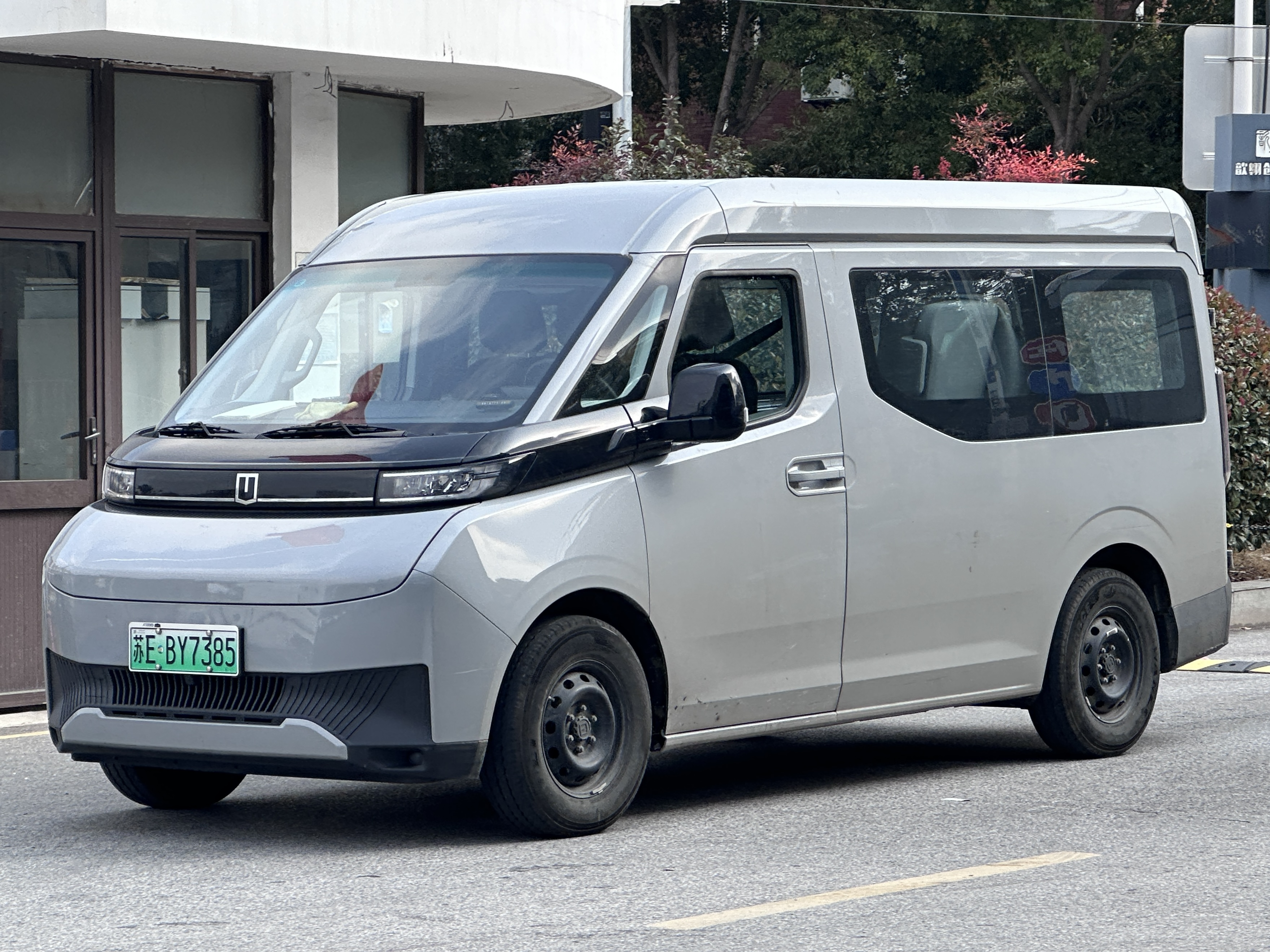
Farizon SV (SWB)

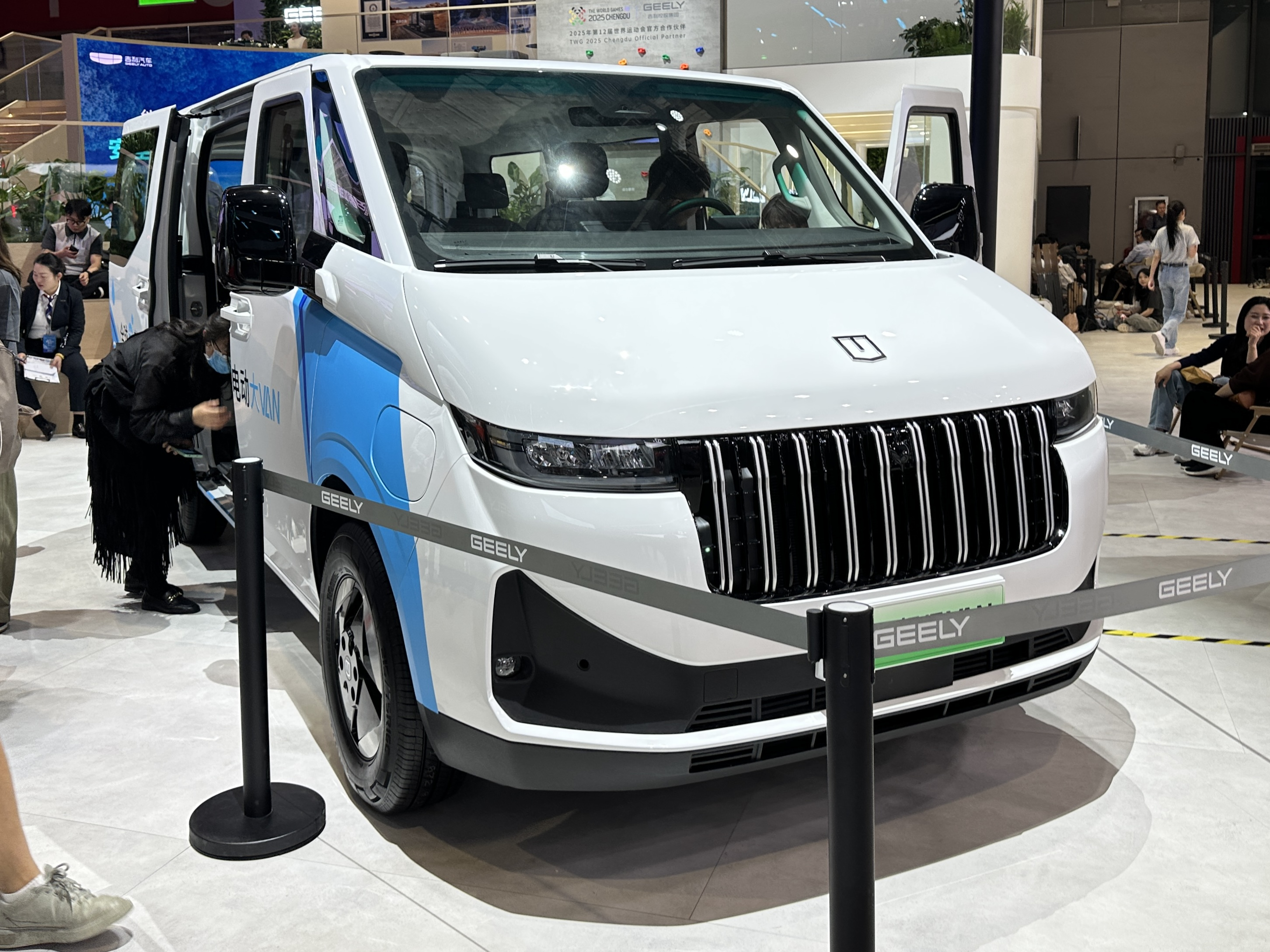
Farizon SV-M

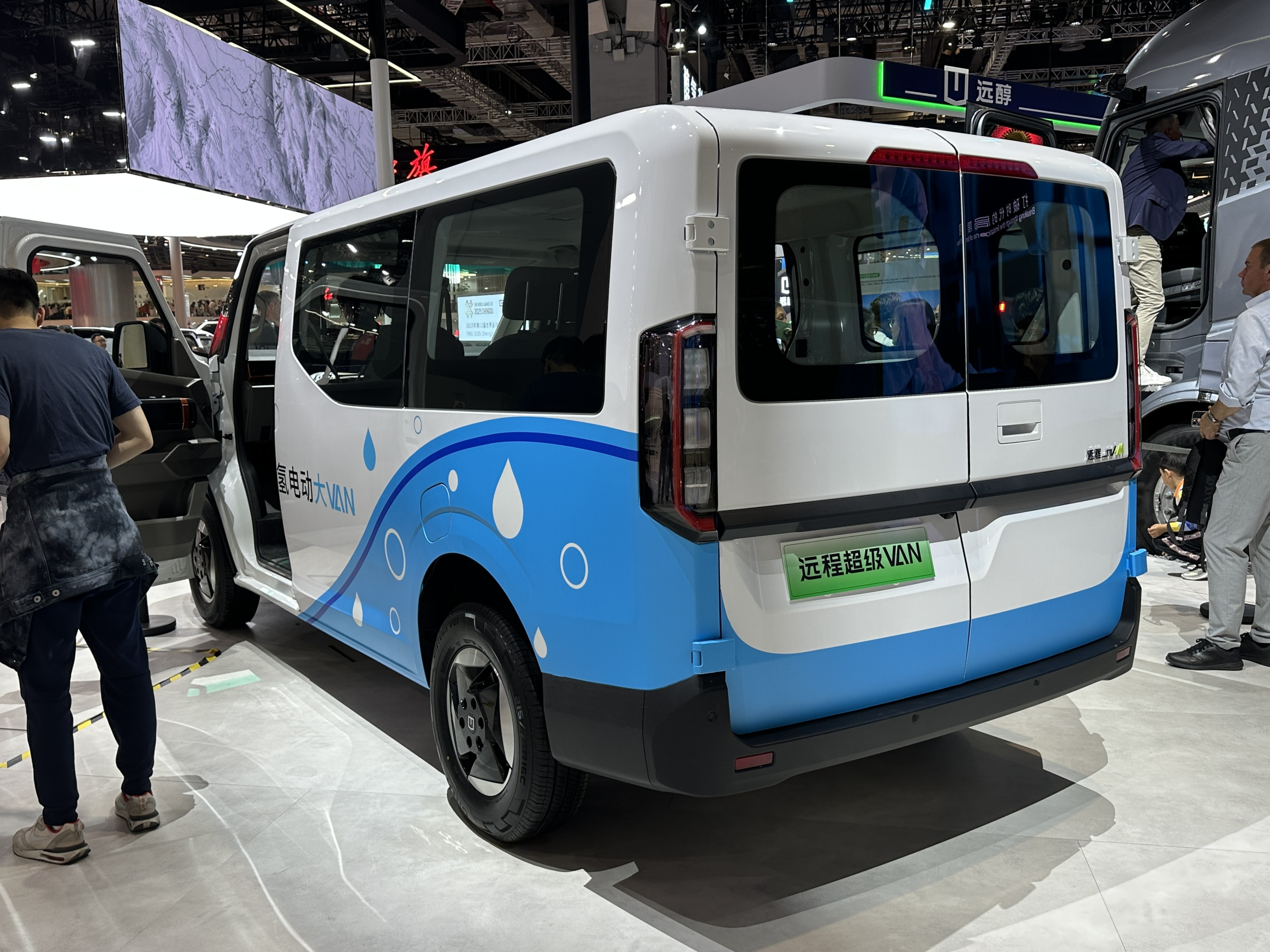
Rear view

== Powertrain ==
The Farizon SV is powered by a front-mounted electric motor producing approximately 170 kW (228 hp) and delivering instant torque to the front wheels.

Three battery capacities are available: 67 kWh, 83 kWh, and 106 kWh. Depending on configuration, official driving range figures reach up to approximately 247 miles (397 km) under WLTP testing conditions.

Rapid charging capability allows replenishment from 20% to 80% in around 36–40 minutes using high-power DC charging systems. Payload capacity varies depending on specification but can reach up to approximately 1,350 kilograms. All models support towing loads of up to 2,000 kilograms with a braked trailer. Standard equipment commonly includes advanced driver-assistance systems such as adaptive cruise control, lane-keeping assistance and 360-degree camera systems.

== Interior and technology ==
The interior layout centers around a large central touchscreen interface controlling vehicle and infotainment functions. Many variants include heated and ventilated seats, digital instrument displays, and smartphone connectivity features such as Android Auto and Apple CarPlay. The model also features integrated payload monitoring systems that estimate vehicle load weight in real time.

== Market launch and sales ==
The Farizon SV entered European markets in 2025 as part of a wider expansion strategy by Geely-owned commercial vehicle brands. The model was introduced to European markets with support from importer Jameel Motors, which established distribution and servicing arrangements during its initial launch phase.

In the United Kingdom, the model qualified for the government’s plug-in van grant scheme, reducing purchase costs for fleet operators and businesses adopting electric vehicles.

Pricing at launch ranged from approximately £45,000 for entry-level versions to around £56,000 for larger long-range models.

== Farizon Xingfuhao ==
The Farizon Xingfuhao (远程吉利幸福号) is the minivan or MPV variant of the SV, featuring traditional single up and over tailgate instead of twin rear barn doors of the SV. With only 68.03kW and 66.57kW batteries available, the Xingfuhao also features the shortest overall length at 5018mm, a wheelbase of 3100mm, and the lowest vehicle height at 1940mm. Price wise, the Xingfuhao is more expensive than slightly larger SV models while all four Xingfuhao models are offered as a 7-seater vehicle. The production of the Xingfuhao started in July 2024, on the same day of the delivery of the 1000th Farizon SV.

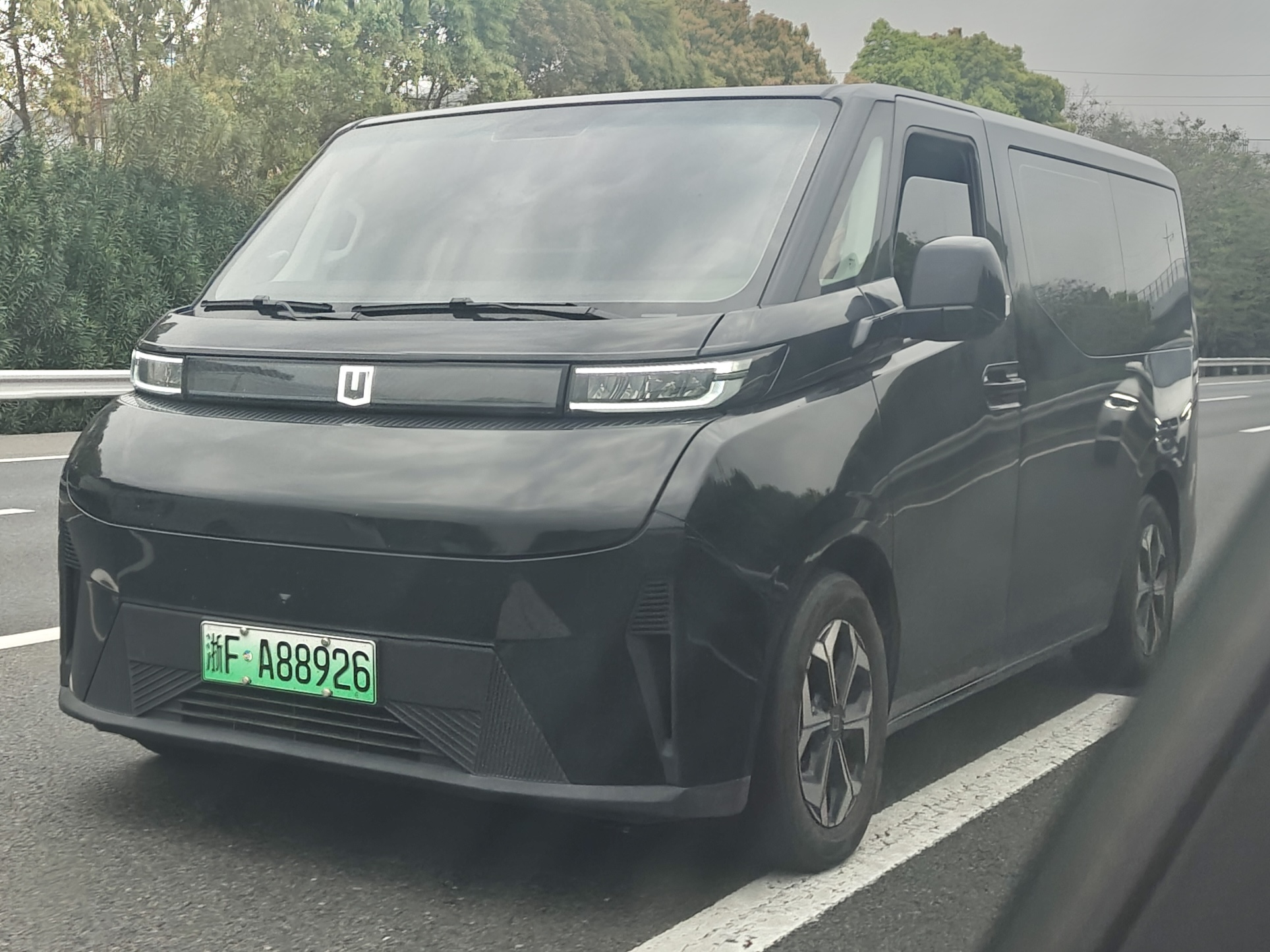
Farizon Xingfuhao

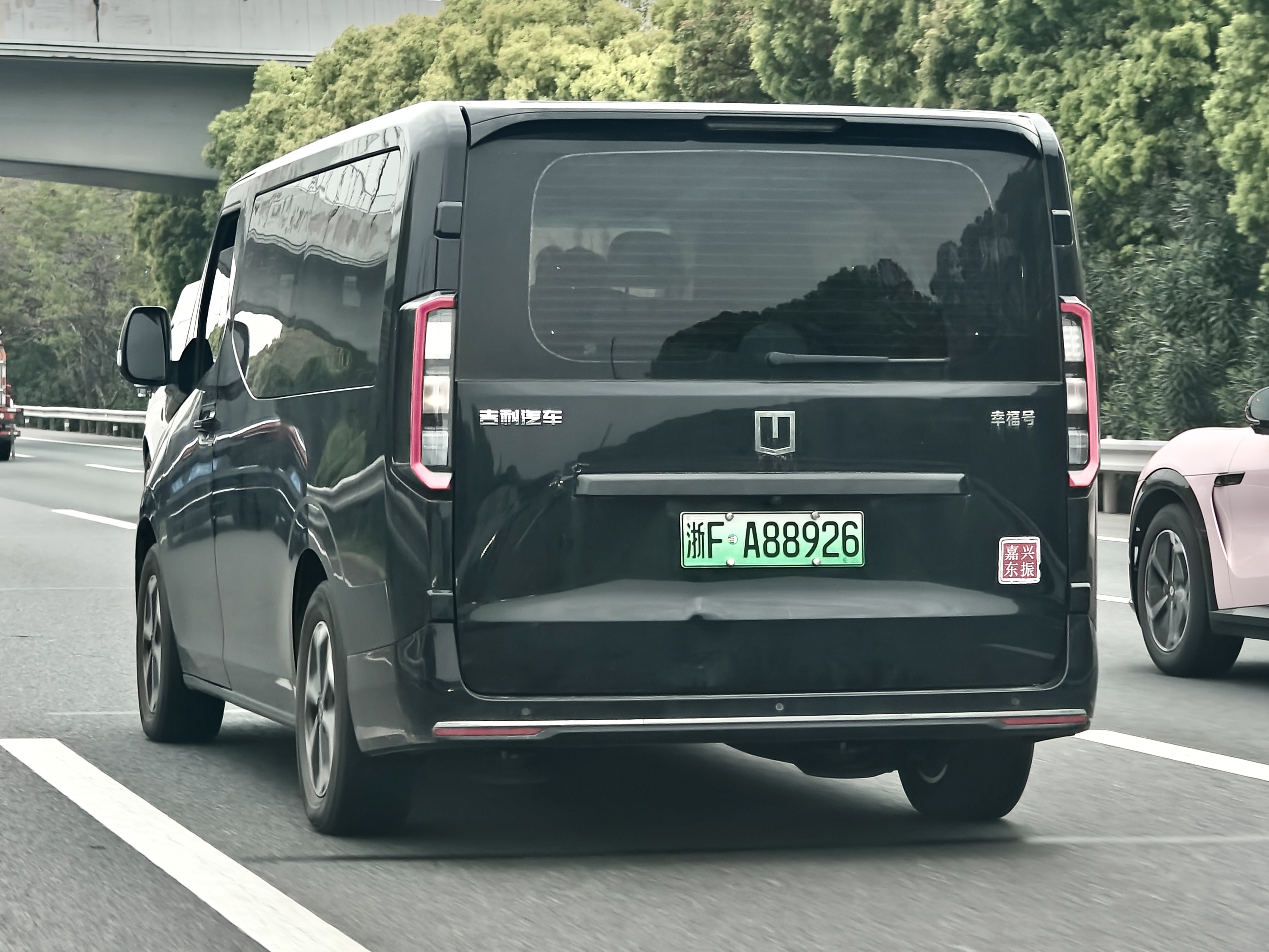
Rear view

== Jinbei Jiyun E9 ==
The Jinbei Jiyun E9 (金杯 吉运E9) is a rebadged variant of the Farizon SV launched in December 2024 by Jinbei in cooperation with Geely.

== Safety ==
ANCAP test results Farizon SV All Australian variants (2024)
Overall
Grading:	84% (Platinum)

Euro NCAP test results Farizon SV (2025)
Test	Score
Overall:	5 /5 stars
Safe driving	60%
Crash avoidance	85%
Post crash	80%
