= Huasong =

Chinese car brand by Brilliance Auto

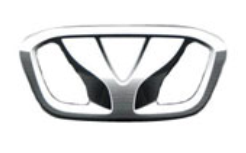
- Current owner: Renault Brilliance Jinbei Automotive
- Country: China
- Introduced: 2014
- Discontinued: 2020
- Related brands: Jinbei
- Website: Official website

Huasong was an automobile brand specializing in vans created in 2014 by Brilliance car manufacturer from China.

== History ==
Brilliance China Automotive Holdings introduced this brand for automobiles at the end of 2014. The manufacturer is Renault Brilliance Jinbei Automotive, a renaming of Shenyang Brilliance Jinbei Automobile, from Shenyang.

Following the creation on 1 January 2018 by Brilliance and Renault of the joint venture Renault-Brilliance-Jinbei Automotive Company, the Huasong brand has since been consolidated, just like its sister brand Jinbei, by the Renault Group.

In July 2020, neither the brand nor the model were mentioned on the manufacturer's website. The last approvals in China were recorded for January 2020. It is assumed that the brand has been discontinued.

== Products ==
Huasong 7 (2014–2020), a large MPV

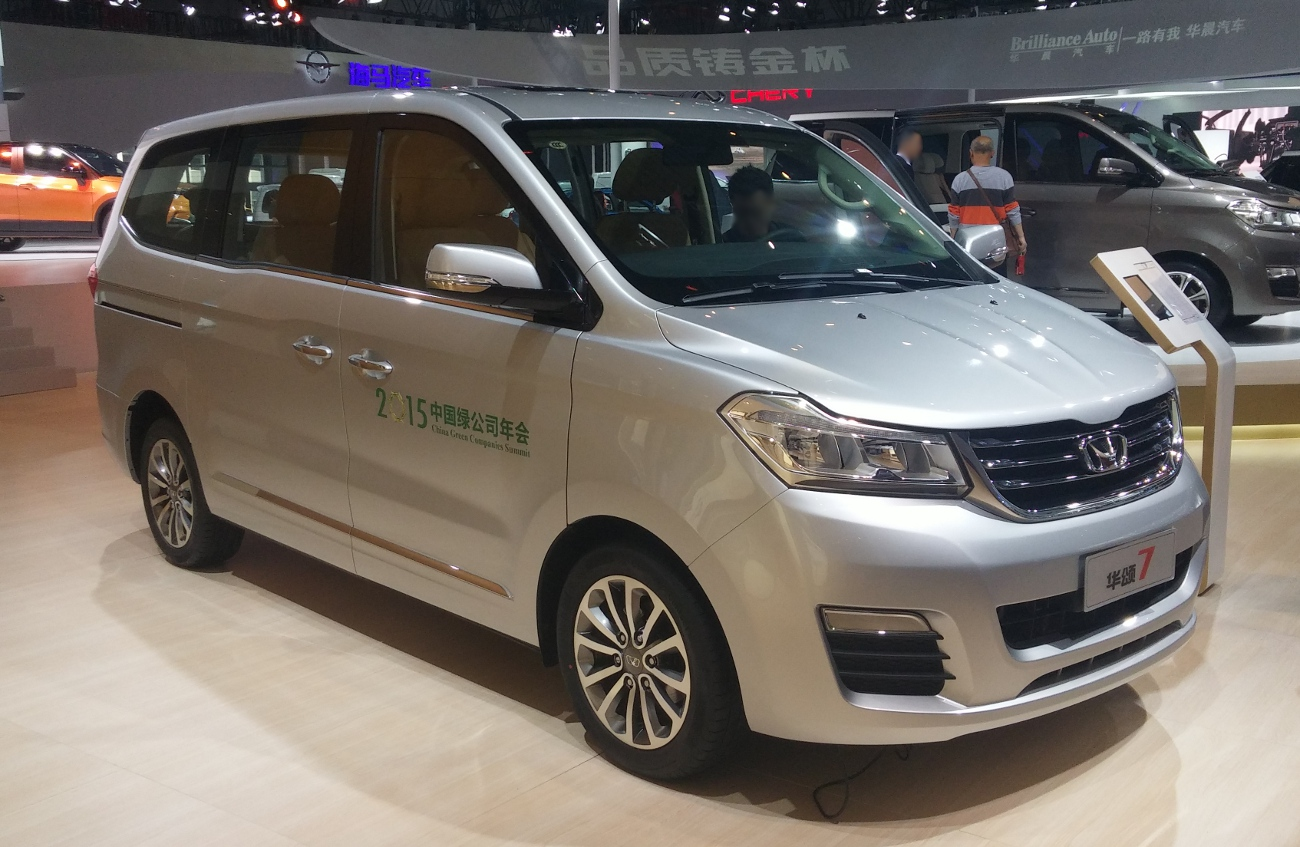
Huasong 7
