= Jinbei S70 =

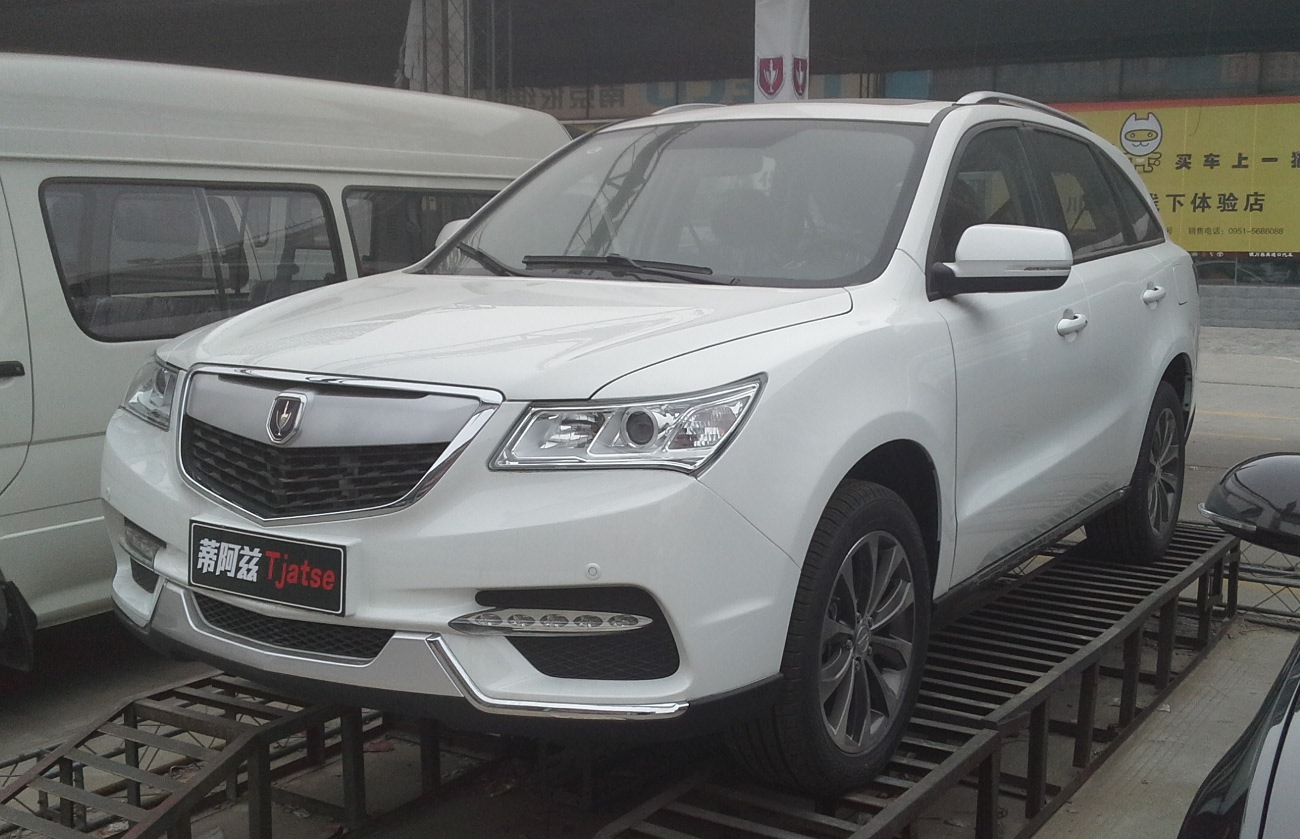

Overview
- Production: 2016–2018
- Model years: 2016–2018

Body and chassis
- Class: Compact crossover SUV
- Body style: 5-door SUV
- Layout: Front-engine, front-wheel-drive

Powertrain
- Engine: 1.5L turbo I4; 154hp @ 5200 rpm 1.5L turbo I4; 154hp @ 5500 rpm
- Transmission: 5-speed manual 6-speed manual

Dimensions
- Wheelbase: 2,725 mm (107 in)
- Length: 4,745 mm (187 in)
- Width: 1,856 mm (73 in)
- Height: 1,710 mm (67 in)
- Curb weight: 1,570-1,615 kg

The Jinbei S70 or Jinbei Tjatse (蒂阿兹) is a compact crossover SUV produced by Jinbei.

== Overview ==
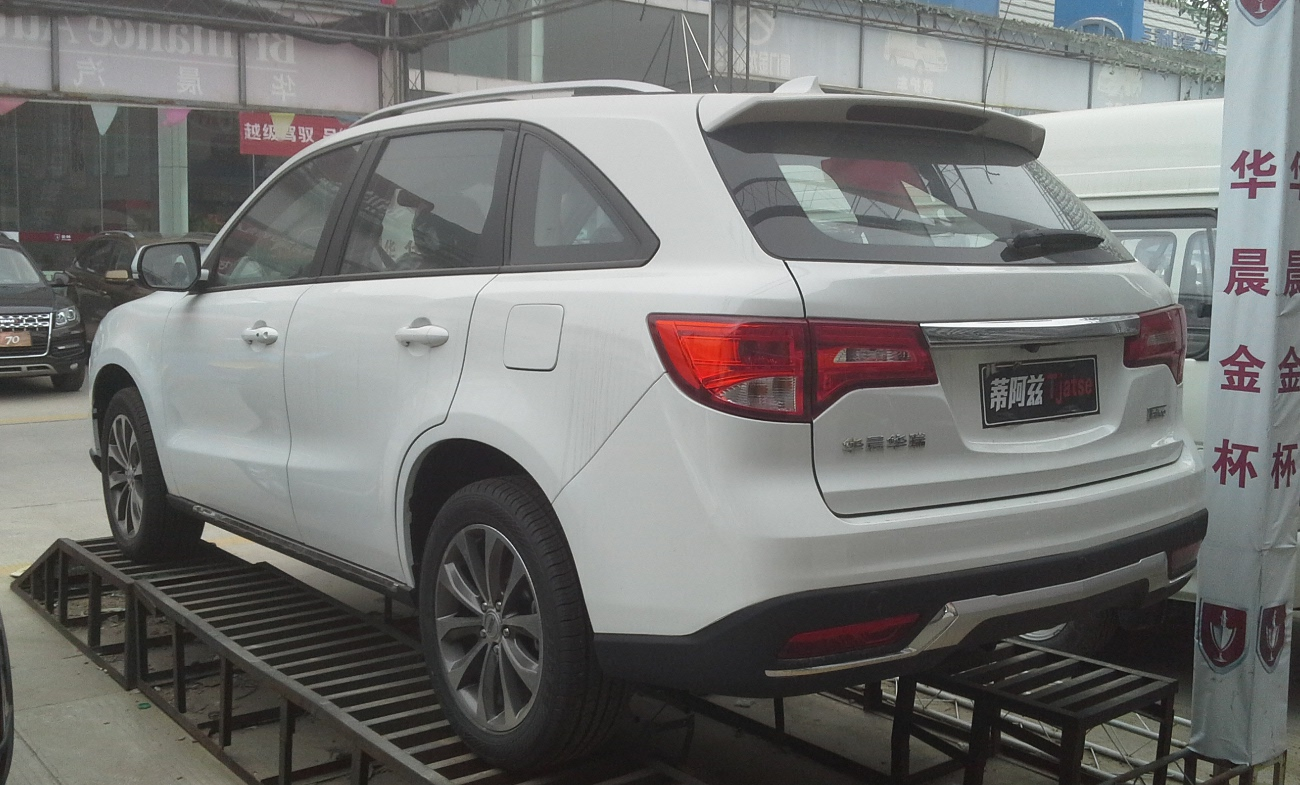
Jinbei S70 rear

The Jinbei S70, or Jinbei Tjatse pronounced as Jinbei Diazi, was unveiled on the 2016 Chengdu Auto Show in China.

Engine options of the Jinbei S70 includes a 1.5L turbo inline 4 producing 154hp at 5200 rpm, and a 1.5L turbo inline 4 producing 154hp at 5500 rpm.

Prices of the Jinbei S70 ranges from 79,800 to 113,00 yuan as of 2019.

It was reported in 2018 that a pickup variant of the Jinbei S70 was in development, sharing everything ahead the C pillars.

== Design controversies ==
The design of the Jinbei S70 is very controversial as the styling was clearly reverse engineered from the third generation Acura MDX.
