= Jinbei Haixing A7 =

Chinese microvan and micro truck produced by Brilliance Auto

The Jinbei T20 was originally launched as the Jinbei Haixing T20, the pickup variant of the Jinbei Haixing A7 microvan produced by Chinese car manufacturer Brilliance Auto under the Jinbei brand. A long wheelbase version called the Jinbei Haixing A9 was also available. The Jinbei Haixing T20 was based on the same platform and shares the same cab design.

== Jinbei Haixing A7/Haixing A9/Haixing T20 (2011-2017) ==
Jinbei Haixing A7
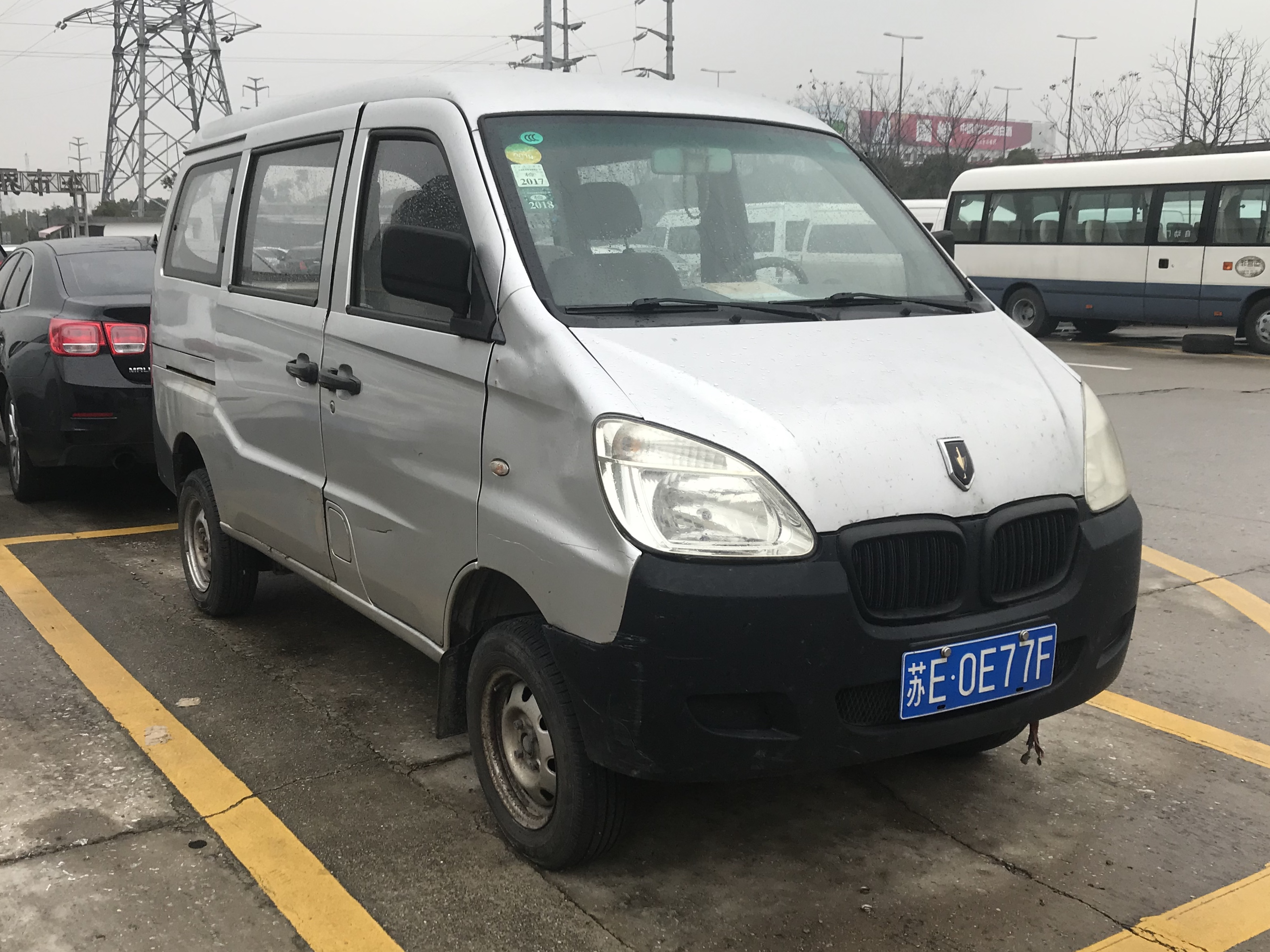
- Jinbei Haixing A9 (Long wheelbase version of the A7)

Overview
- Manufacturer: Brilliance Auto
- Also called: Jinbei Haixing A9 (premium version); Jinbei Haixing T20 (pickup); Jinbei Haixing SY6390; SRM Shineray T20EV (electric pickup)
- Production: 2011–2017
- Model years: 2011–2017

Body and chassis
- Class: Microvan
- Body style: 5-door wagon
- Layout: Mid-engine, rear-wheel-drive

Powertrain
- Engine: 1.0 L I4 (petrol)
- Transmission: 5-speed manual

Dimensions
- Wheelbase: 2,430 mm (95.7 in)
- Length: 3,730 mm (146.9 in)
- Width: 1,510 mm (59.4 in)
- Height: 1,870 mm (73.6 in)

The Jinbei Haixing A7 price range starts from 29,800 yuan and ends at 34,800 yuan. The engine of the Haixing A7 is a 1.0 liter four-cylinder producing 61hp. The Jinbei Haixing A9 price range starts from 34,800 yuan and ends at 39,900 yuan while sharing the same engine. The Jinbei Haixing A7 and A9 was built by Brilliance Xinyuan Chongqing Auto (华晨鑫源), the Chongqing branch of Brilliance Auto.

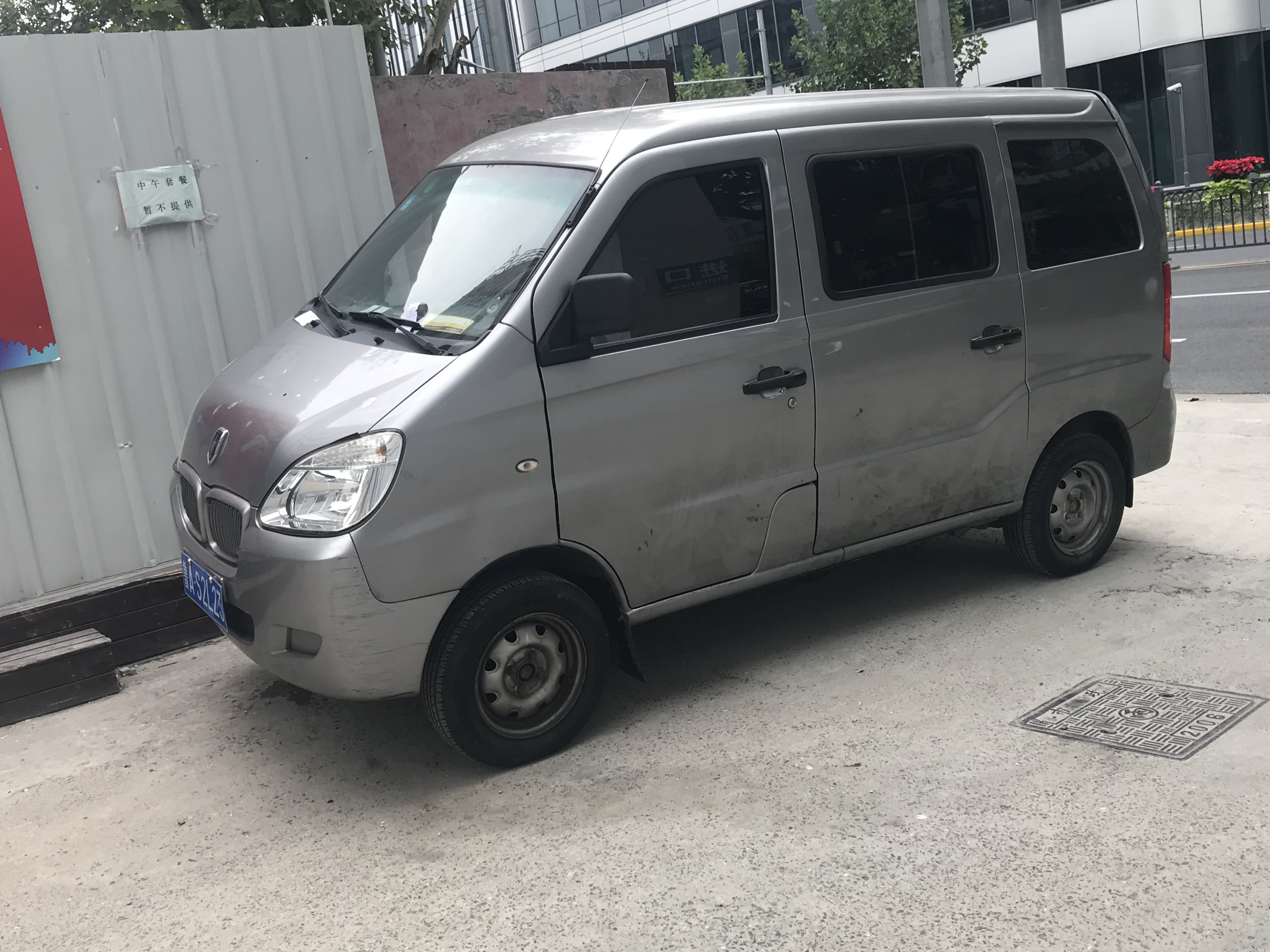
Jinbei Haixing A7 front quarter

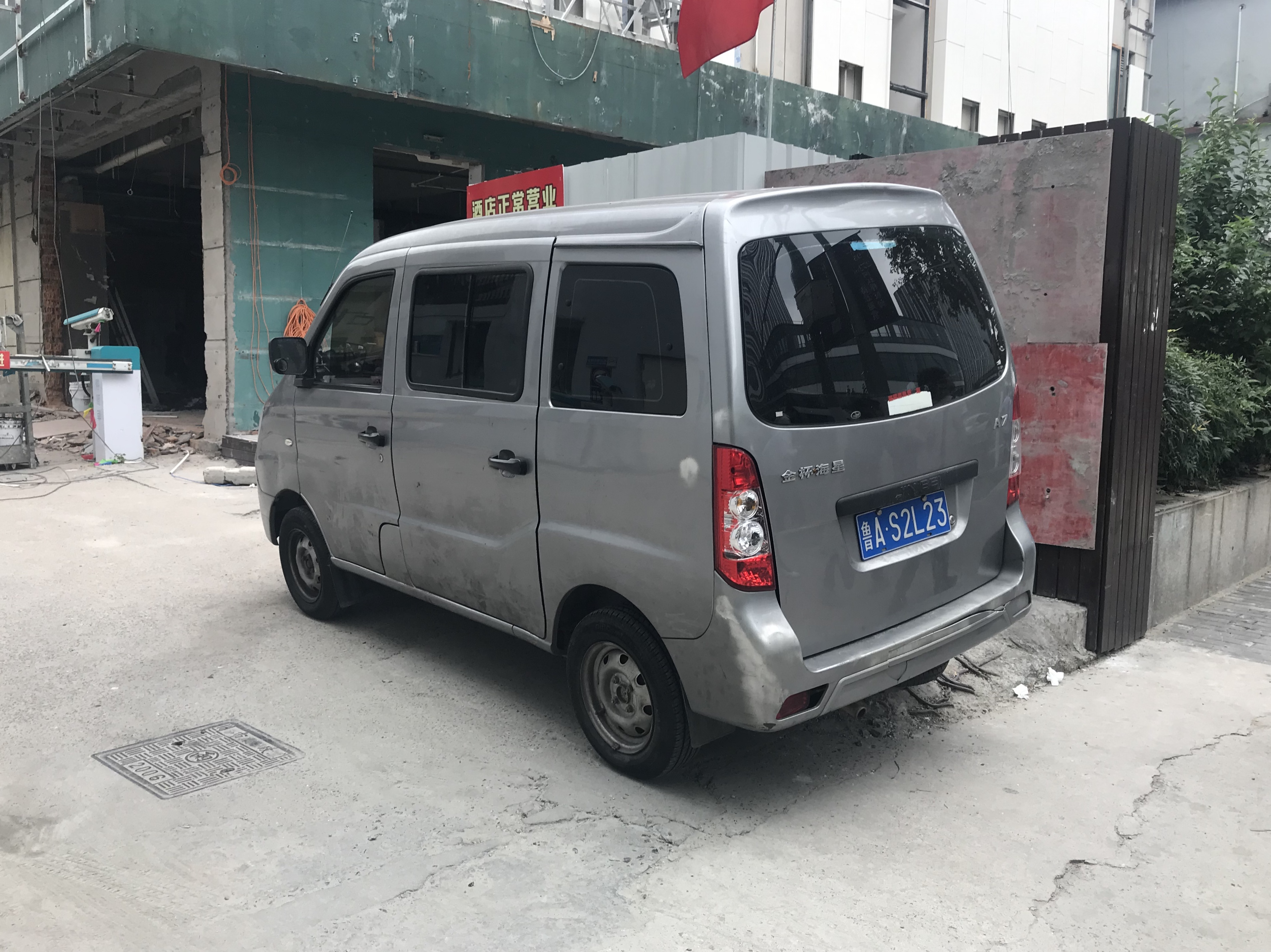
Jinbei Haixing A7 rear quarter

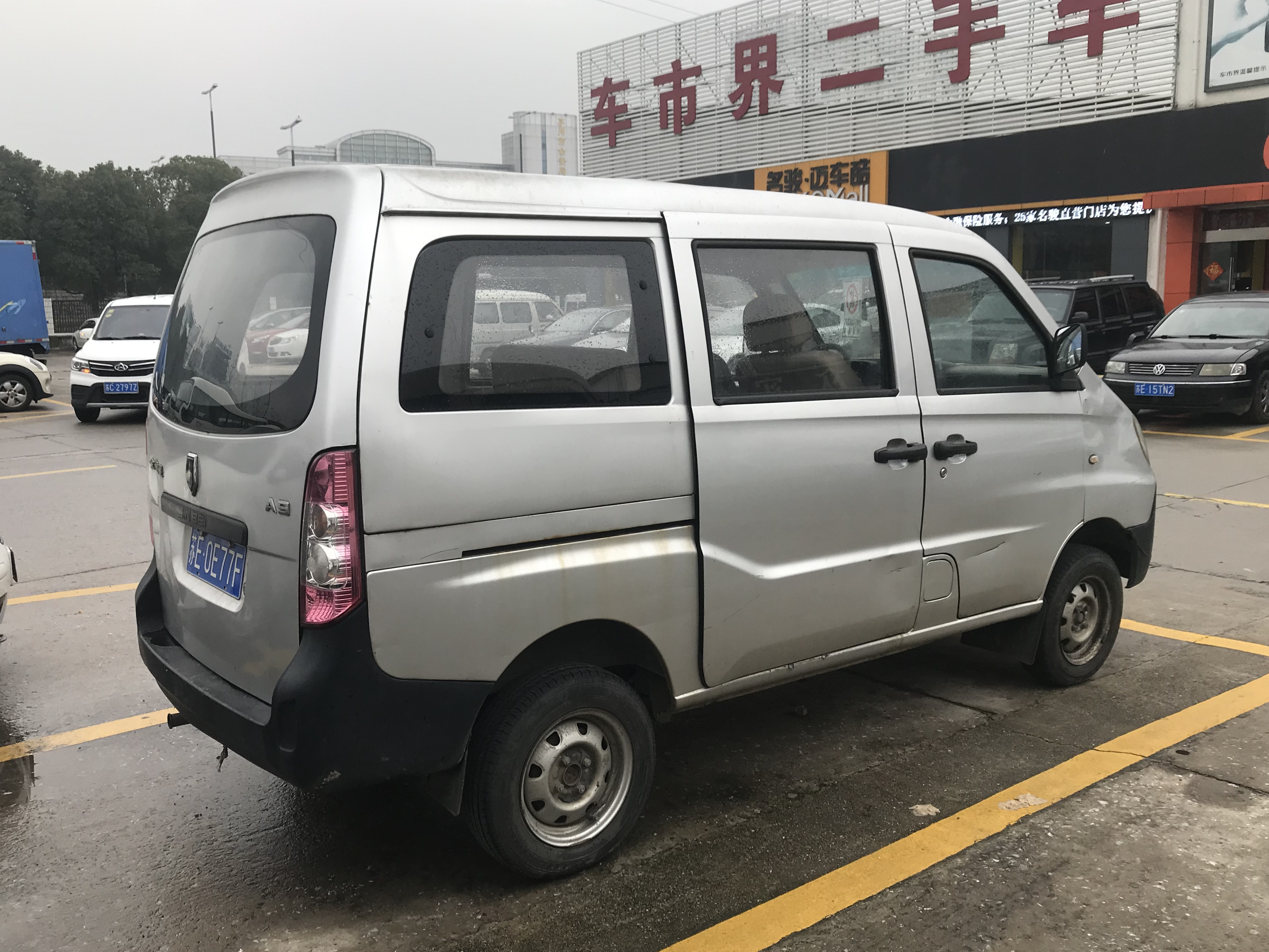
Jinbei Haixing A9 rear quarter

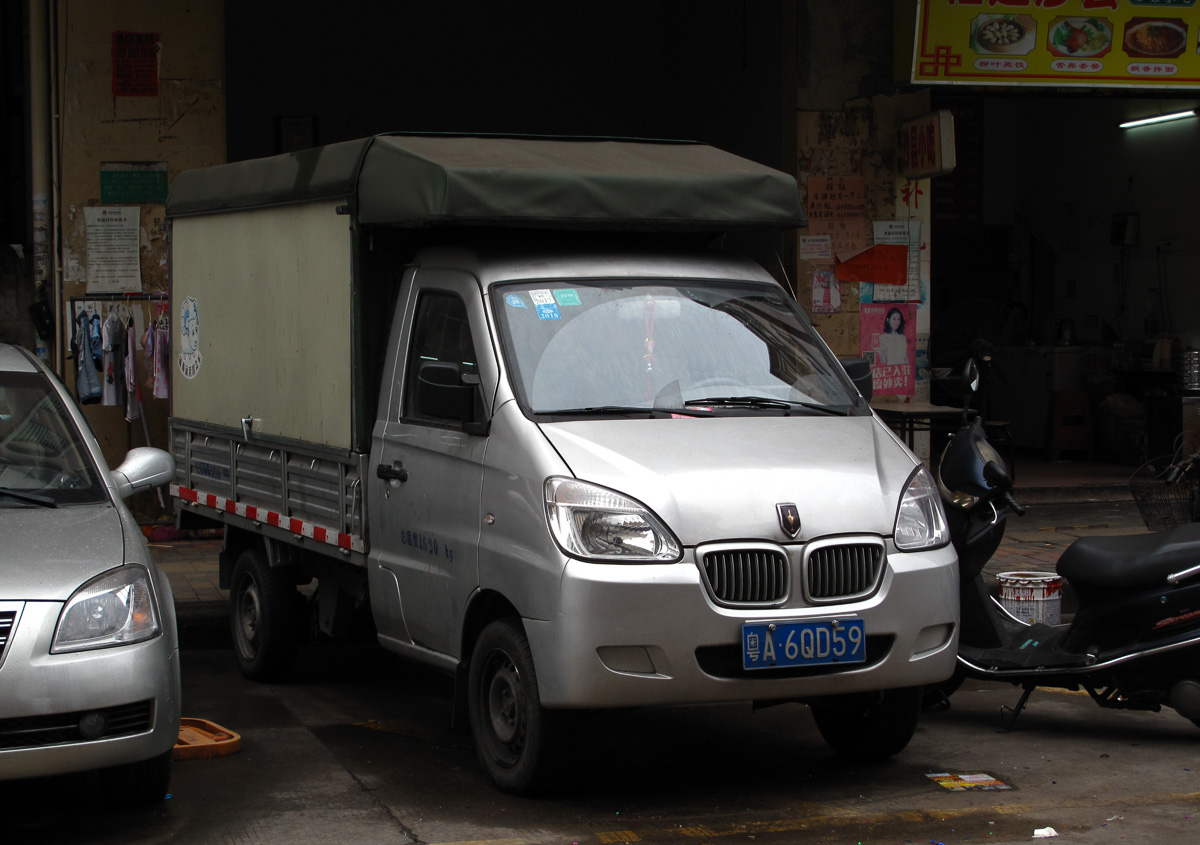
Jinbei Haixing T20

=== SRM Shineray T20EV ===
The SRM Shineray T20EV is the electric pickup variant of the Jinbei Haixing T20. The model was launched in July 2018 and features the exact same design as the Haixing T20. The SRM Shineray T20EV weighs 890kg and is powered by a rear-positioned motor with rear-wheel-drive. The Battery is a 35.04kWh battery and the electric range is 230km.

== Jinbei T20 pickup variants (2017-present) ==
The pickup version, Jinbei Haixing T20, was later renamed to Jinbei T20. The Jinbei T20 also spawned a few variants with an entry-level single cab pickup called the Jinbei T10 and an entry-level crew cab pickup called the Jinbei T12, while the original T20 received a facelift with a crew cab variant called the Jinbei T22, a more rugged single cab variant called the Jinbei T20S, and a more rugged crew cab variant called the Jinbei T22S. Only the pickup variants remained on sale from 2017.

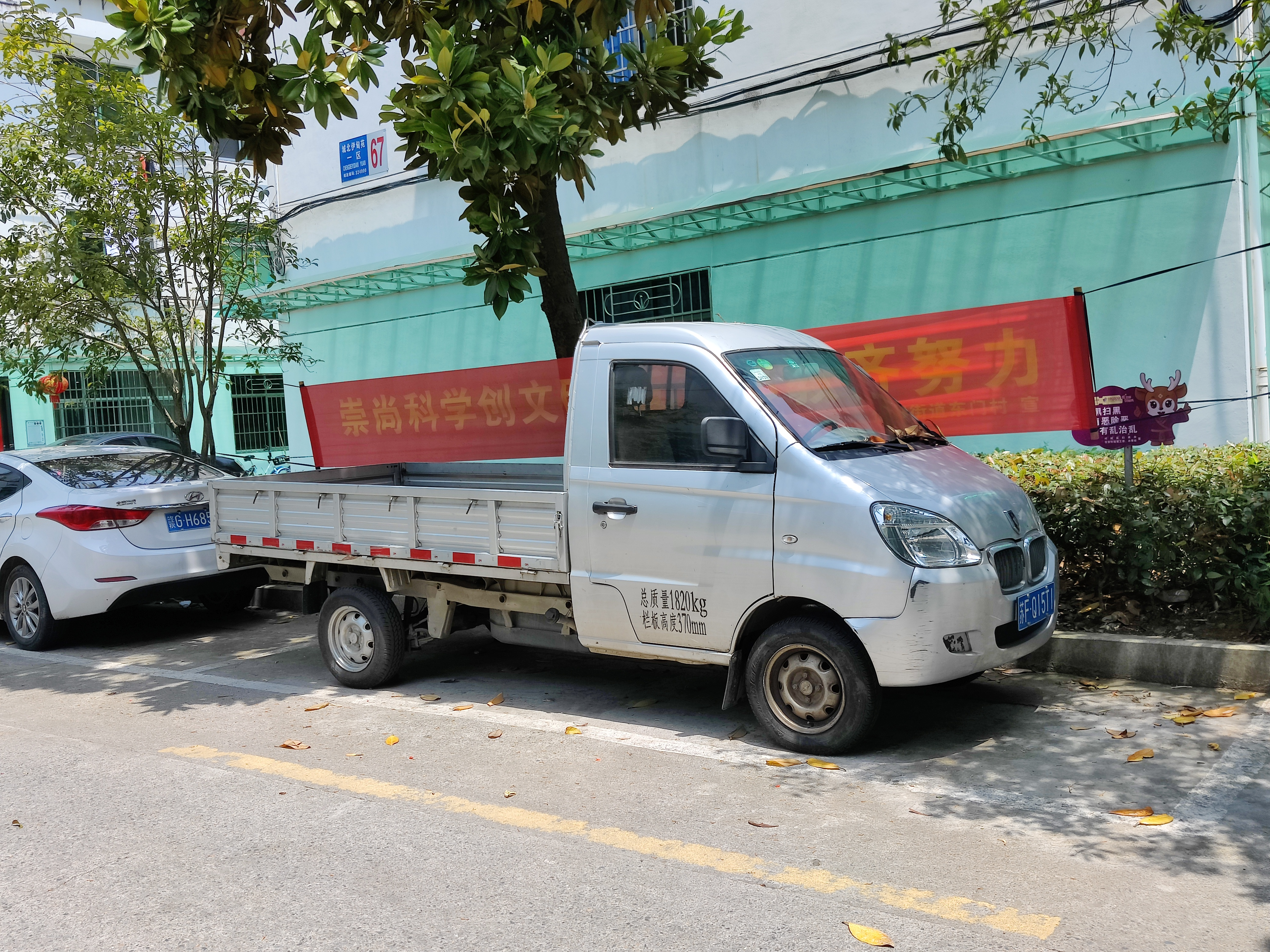
Original Jinbei T20

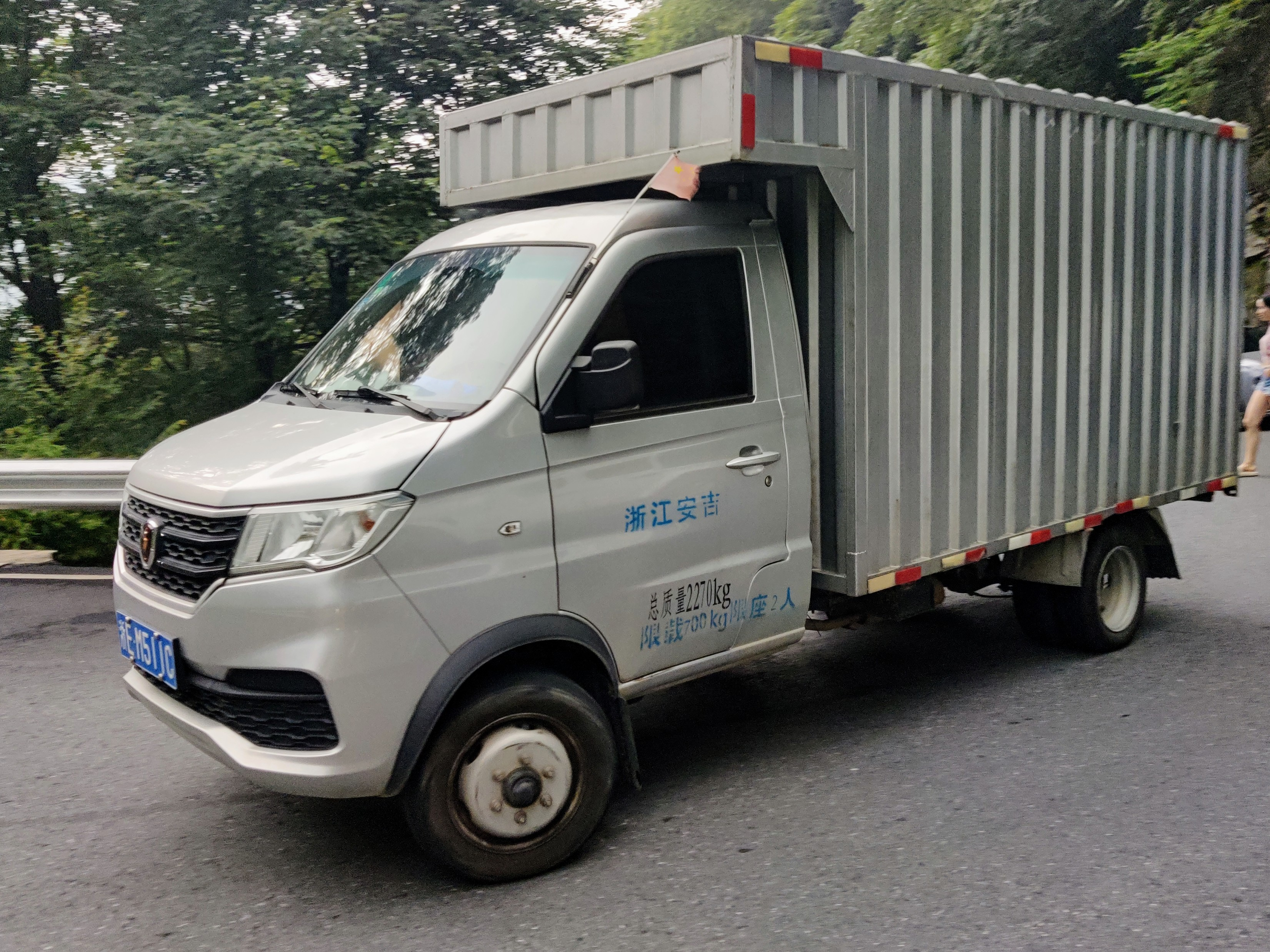
Jinbei T20 facelift
