= Jinbei F50 =

Chinese MPV

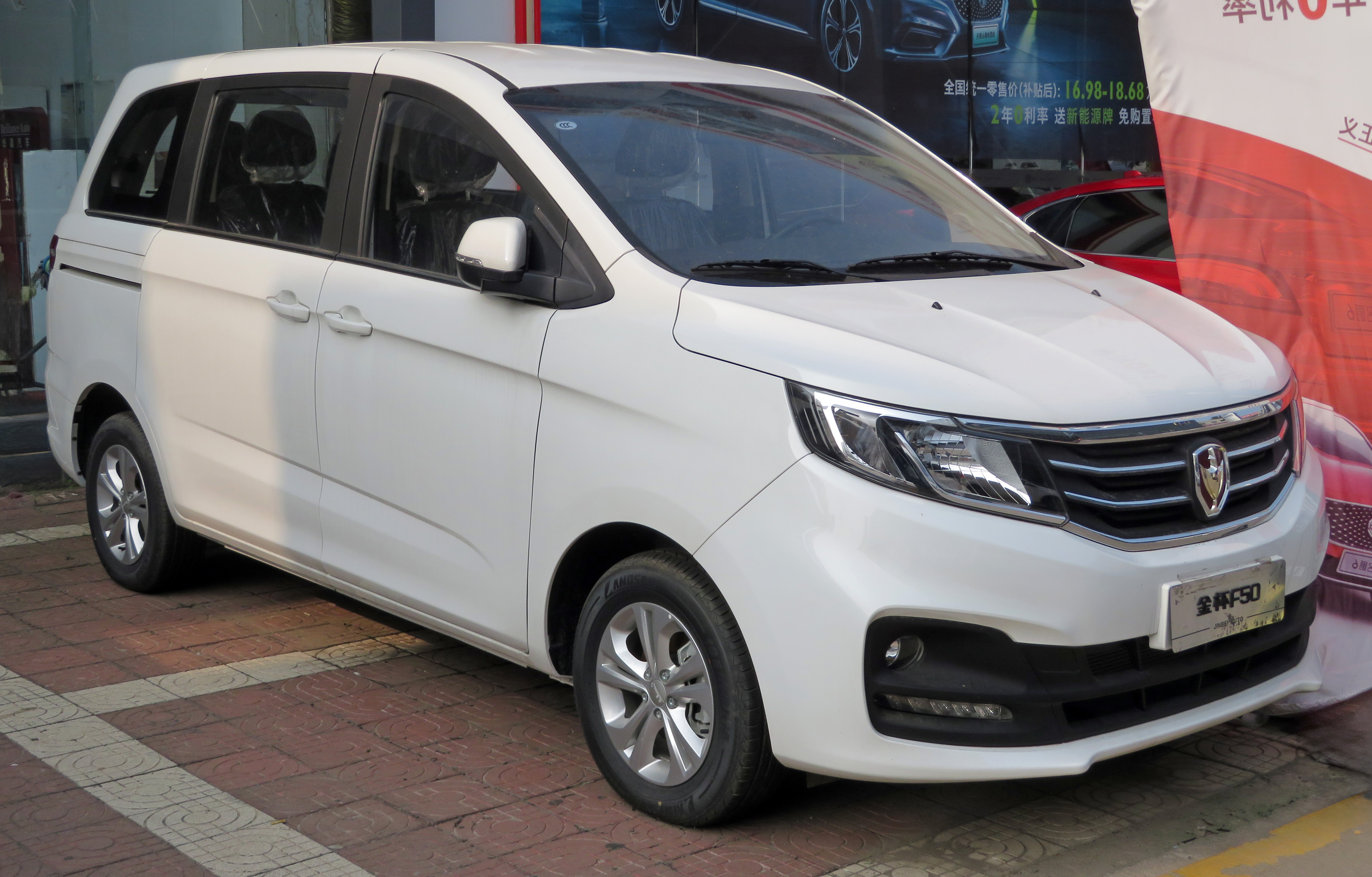

Overview
- Manufacturer: Jinbei (marque)
- Production: 2017–2021
- Assembly: China

Body and chassis
- Class: MPV
- Body style: 5-door minivan
- Layout: Front-engine, front-wheel-drive

Powertrain
- Engine: 1.6L four-cylinder petrol engine
- Transmission: 5-speed manual

Dimensions
- Wheelbase: 2,860 mm (113 in)
- Length: 4,745 mm (186.8 in)
- Width: 1,810 mm (71 in)
- Height: 1,845 mm (72.6 in)
- Curb weight: 1,480 kg (3,260 lb)

The Jinbei F50 is a compact MPV produced by Jinbei.

== Overview ==
The Jinbei F50 debuted on the 2017 Shanghai Auto Show. The engine of the F50 is a 1.6-litre naturally aspirated engine producing a maximum output of 118hp（87kW）and 154N·m. The engine is mated to a 5-speed manual transmission, and the official fuel consumption is 6.7L/100km. and was launched in China by May 2017 with prices ranging from 59,900 yuan to 80,900 yuan.

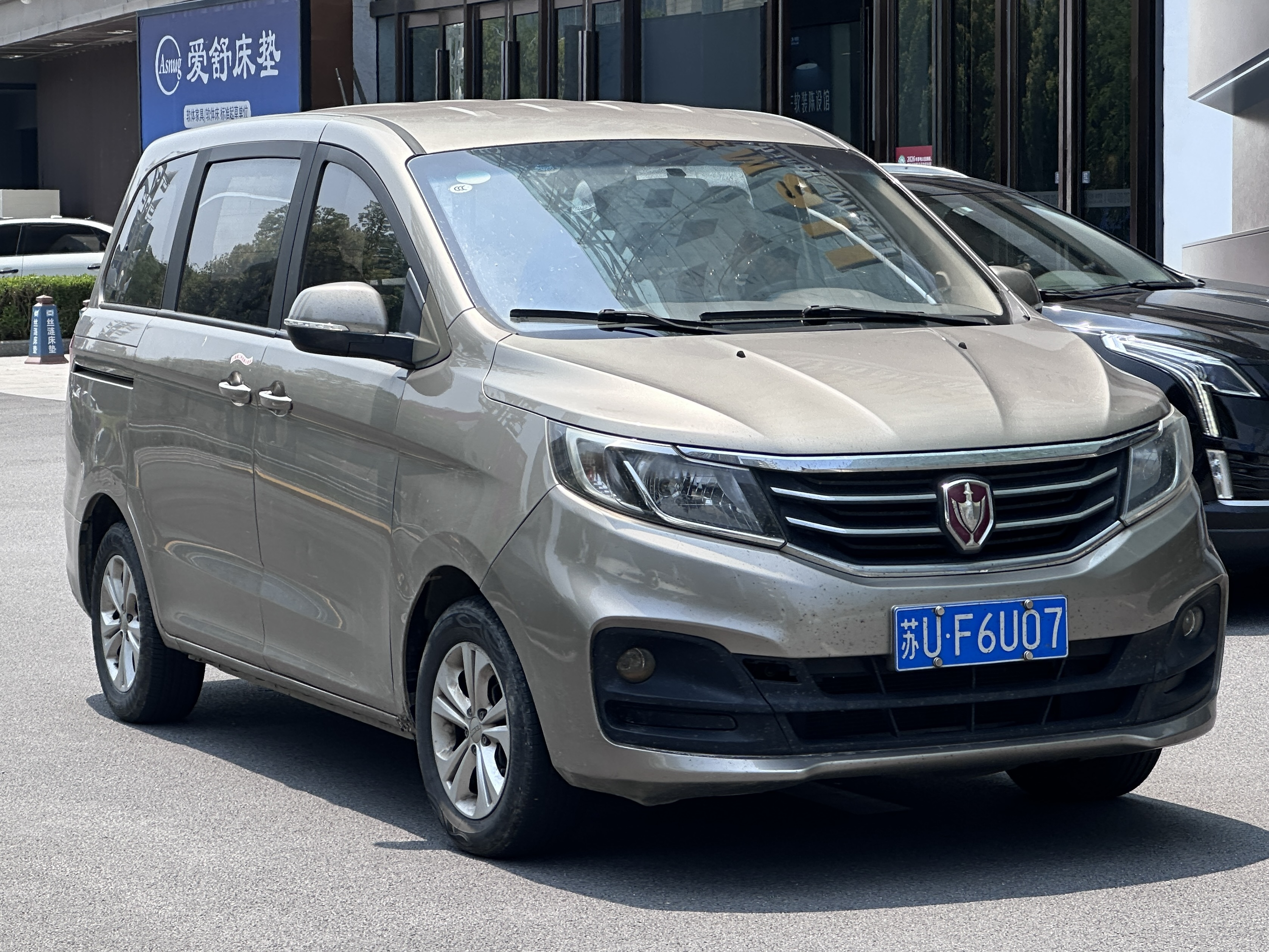
Jinbei F50 front view

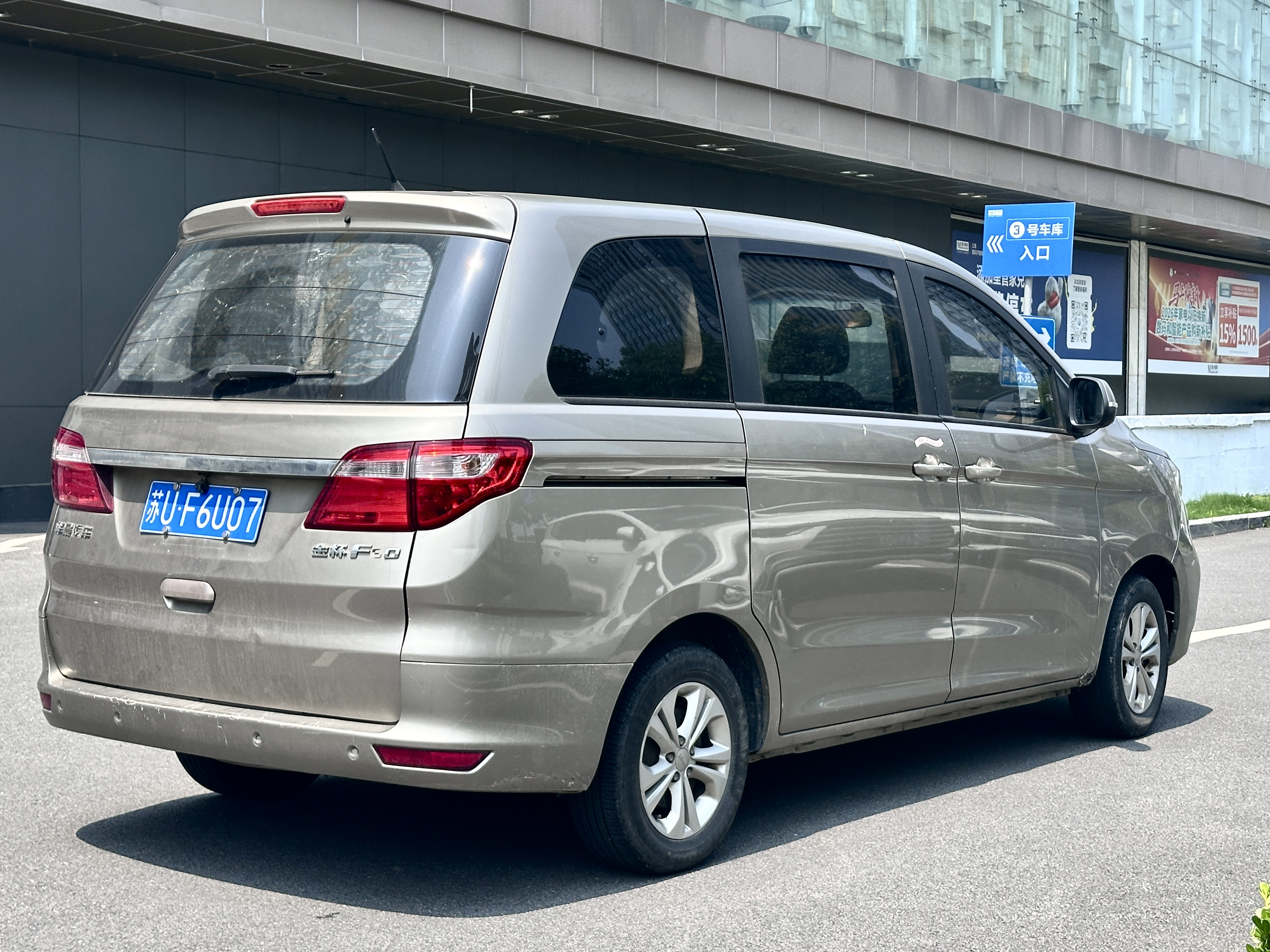
Jinbei F50 rear view
