= Jinbei (car brand) =

Chinese automobile brand

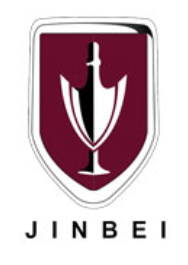
- Product type: Automobile brand
- Current owner: Renault Brilliance Jinbei
- Country: China
- Introduced: 1991; 35 years ago
- Related brands: Huasong (sister brand)
- Previous owners: Brilliance Auto (through Shenyang Brilliance Jinbei Automotive)
- Ambassador: Liu Pengcheng (brand's Chairman)
- Website: auto-jinbei.com jinbeisy.com

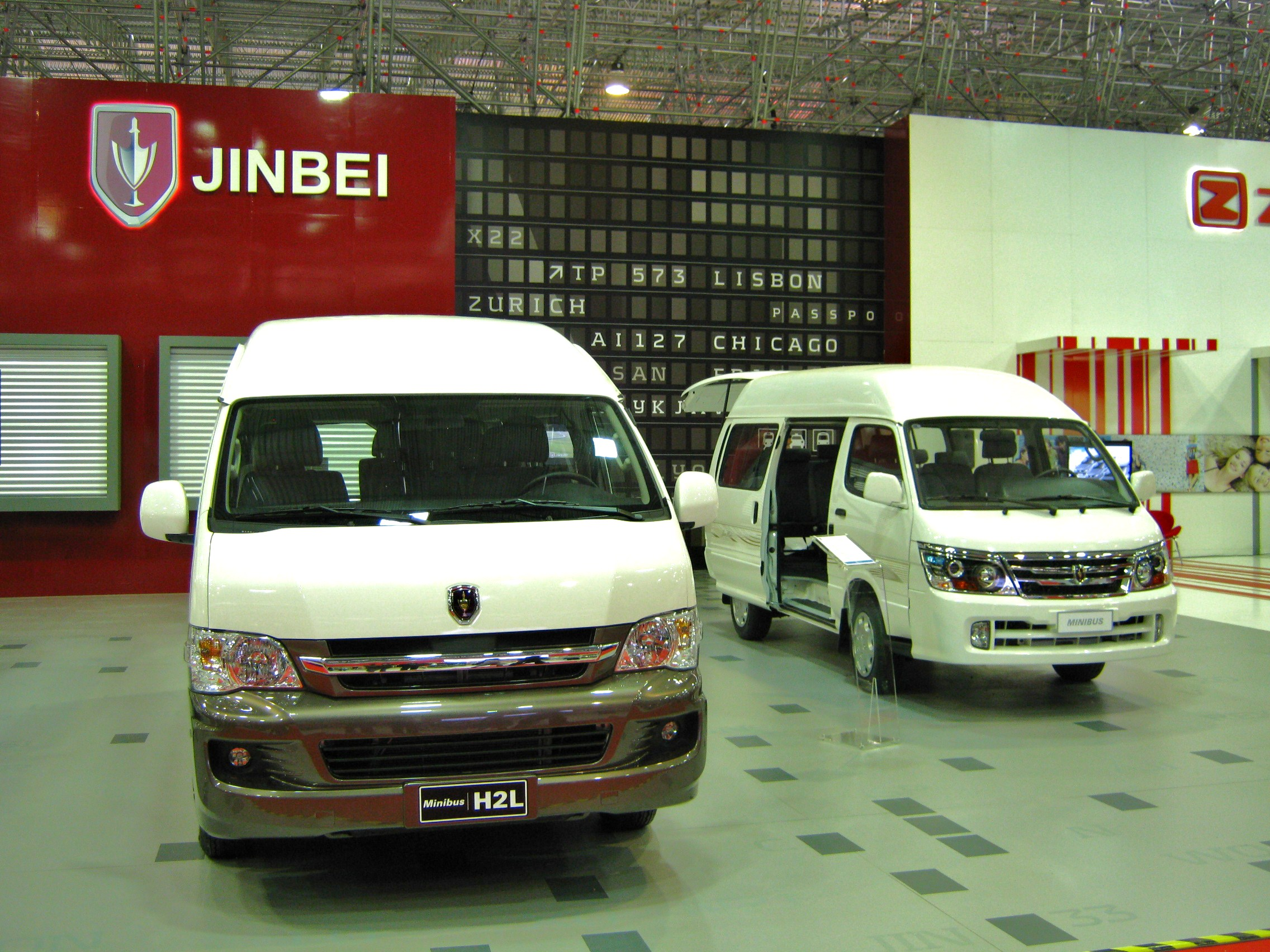
Jinbei minibuses on display in Chile, 2010

Jinbei (Chinese: 金杯; pinyin: Jīnbēi; lit. 'Gold Cup') is a Chinese automobile brand owned by Renault Brilliance Jinbei Automotive Co., Ltd., a joint venture between Brilliance Auto (51%) and Renault (49%) established in December 2017 and based in Shenyang, Liaoning, China. Until 2017, the marque was owned by Shenyang Brilliance Jinbei Automotive, a Brilliance subsidiary also based in Shenyang.

There are other sister companies that also used or are related to the Jinbei brand: Brilliance Shineray and the listed company Shenyang Jinbei Automotive.

== History ==
The Jinbei brand was launched into the market in 1991, selling products with Toyota's technology.

The Jinbei brand was used and produced by listed company Shenyang Jinbei Automotive, which formed a joint venture with General Motors (GM), as well as Shenyang Jinbei Coach Manufacturing with Brilliance Auto, which later known as Shenyang Brilliance Jinbei. Shenyang Jinbei Automotive was acquired by FAW Group in 1995, but sold back to the local government of Shenyang in 2000. The joint venture, with GM, is no longer in operation.

The listed company was acquired by Brilliance Auto Group, the parent company of the listed company Brilliance Auto, in 2018.

Despite retaining the name "Jinbei", Shenyang Jinbei Automotive no longer produces automobile but automobile parts only. The Jinbei brand is mainly produced by Shenyang Brilliance Jinbei Automotive instead.

In December 2017, Brilliance Auto and Renault announced the latter would be acquiring a 49% of the brand's owner company Shenyang Brilliance Jinbei Automotive, which was later reincorporated as Renault Brilliance Jinbei. The transaction was completed in January 2018.

Jinbei's upmarket sister brand Huasong was launched in 2014.

In 2018, Renault Brilliance Jinbei announced plans to launch up to seven light commercial vehicles and SUVs with Renault technology, under the Jinbei and Renault brands. However, in December 2021 the Renault Brilliance Jinbei Automobile JV filed for bankruptcy. This setback for the French group in China followed the failure of the JV with Dongfeng a year earlier.

== Products ==
Brilliance (through its subsidiary Shenyang Automotive) has manufactured and sold all of its minibuses under the Jinbei and Huasong brands in a variety of models based on the structure of the Toyota HiAce vans in China. The Group's principal minibus products are the deluxe minibus and the mid-priced minibus, targeting various market segments in the Chinese commercial and passenger car segments. The deluxe models and mid-priced models include the Granse, the Aurora and the Shuttler etc.

Shenyang Jinbei has produced the Jinbei Haise, also known as the "Haishi" (海狮), the Jinbei's version of the Toyota HiAce, and also produced the Granvia, locally called the "Geruisi" (阁瑞斯) (Jinbei Granse).

Chinese-built models are exported to numerous countries. One of their export markets is Chile, which started to receive them in 2008.

=== Production outside China ===
Units for the African market are manufactured by the Bavarian Auto Manufacturing Company, an Egyptian subsidiary of BMW, in the 6th of October City South west Cairo-Egypt. Available model is the Jinbei Cargo Van (de) which is available as an ambulance or police car also. It is assembled in the 1999 and 2003 generation versions.

Another manufacturer of Jinbei vehicles is IKK Ichigan, Inc. in Manila, Philippines which offers the assembled models Jinbei 2 Ton, Jinbei 3 Ton and Jinbei 3 Ton. The Haise and Granse models are imported by the company and are not listed in its official product lineup.

== Models ==
=== Current ===
- Jinbei Haise MK5
- Jinbei New Haise
- Jinbei Grand Haise
- Jinbei Haishiwang
- Jinbei Jiyun E6 (吉运E6)
- Jinbei Jiyun E9 (吉运E9)

=== Discontinued ===
- Chevrolet Blazer (in co-operation with GM)
- Chevrolet S-10 (in co-operation with GM)
- Jinbei Konect (Guanjing)
- Jinbei S30 - a subcompact crossover
- Jinbei S50 - a mid-size crossover
- Jinbei S70 (Jinbei Tjatse S70)
- Jinbei 750 - a compact MPV
- Jinbei F50
- Jinbei Granse
- Jinbei Granse Classic
- Jinbei Haixing X30 - (Jinbei X30) - a micro passenger van.
- Jinbei Haixing A7 (A9) - a micro passenger van.
- Jinbei Haise MK6
- Jinbei Haise X30L
  - Jinbei T50 - single cab cab chassis
  - Jinbei T52 - dual cab cab chassis
- Jinbei Haise S

== Gallery ==
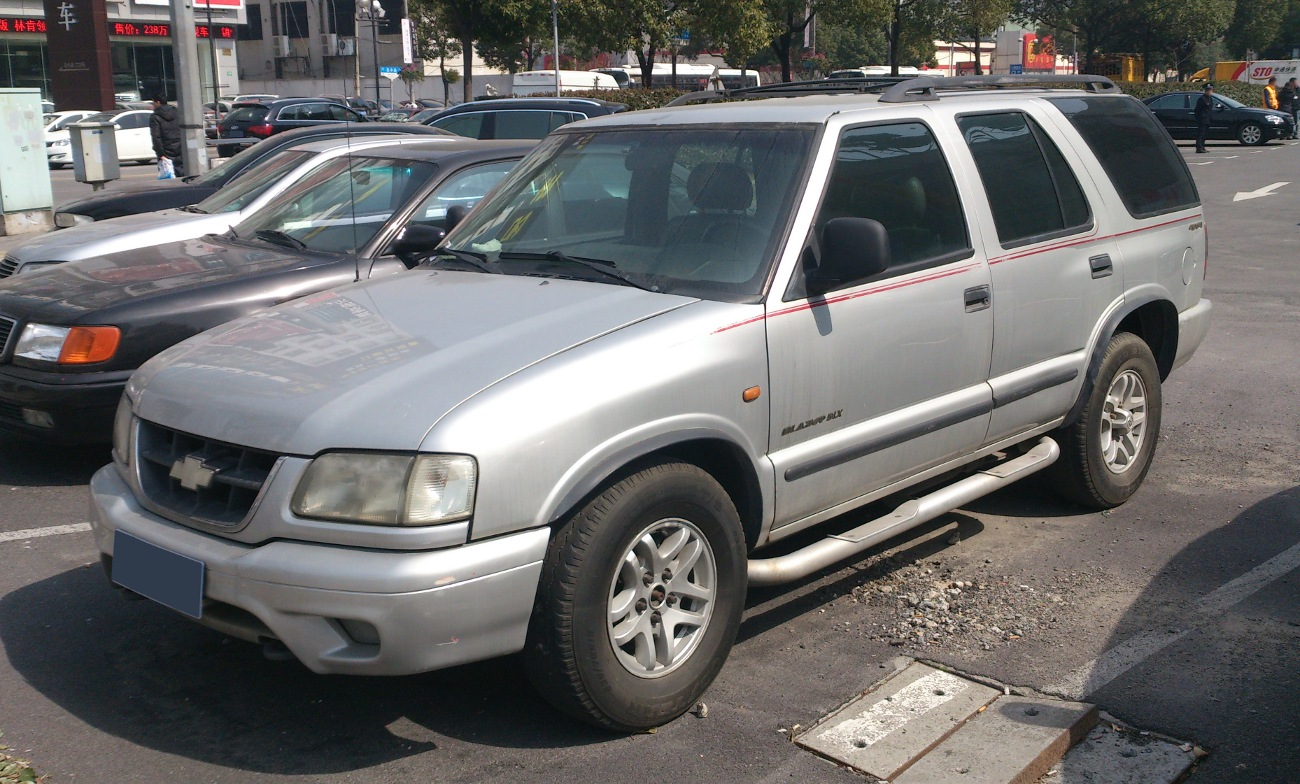
Jinbei-GM Chevrolet Blazer

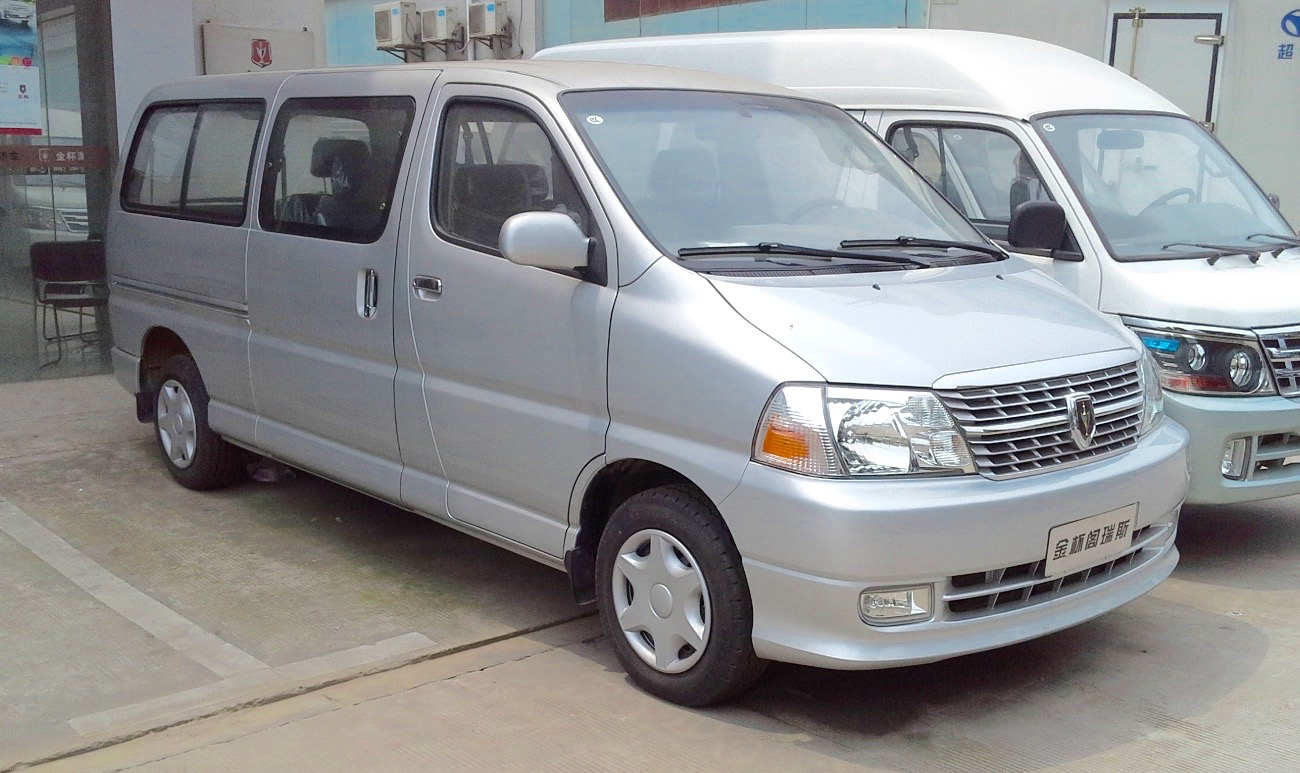
Jinbei Granse

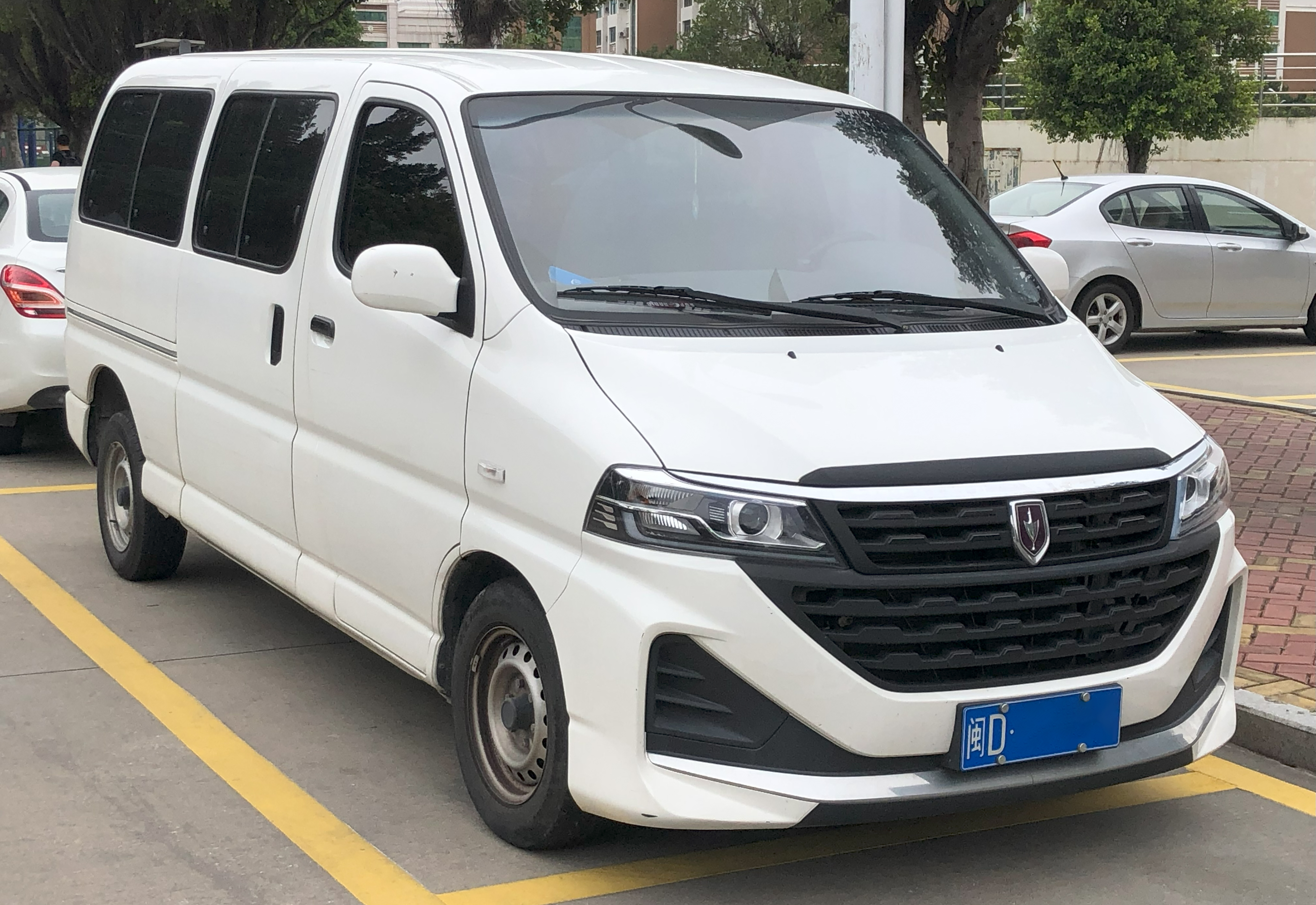
Jinbei Haise King (Haishiwang)

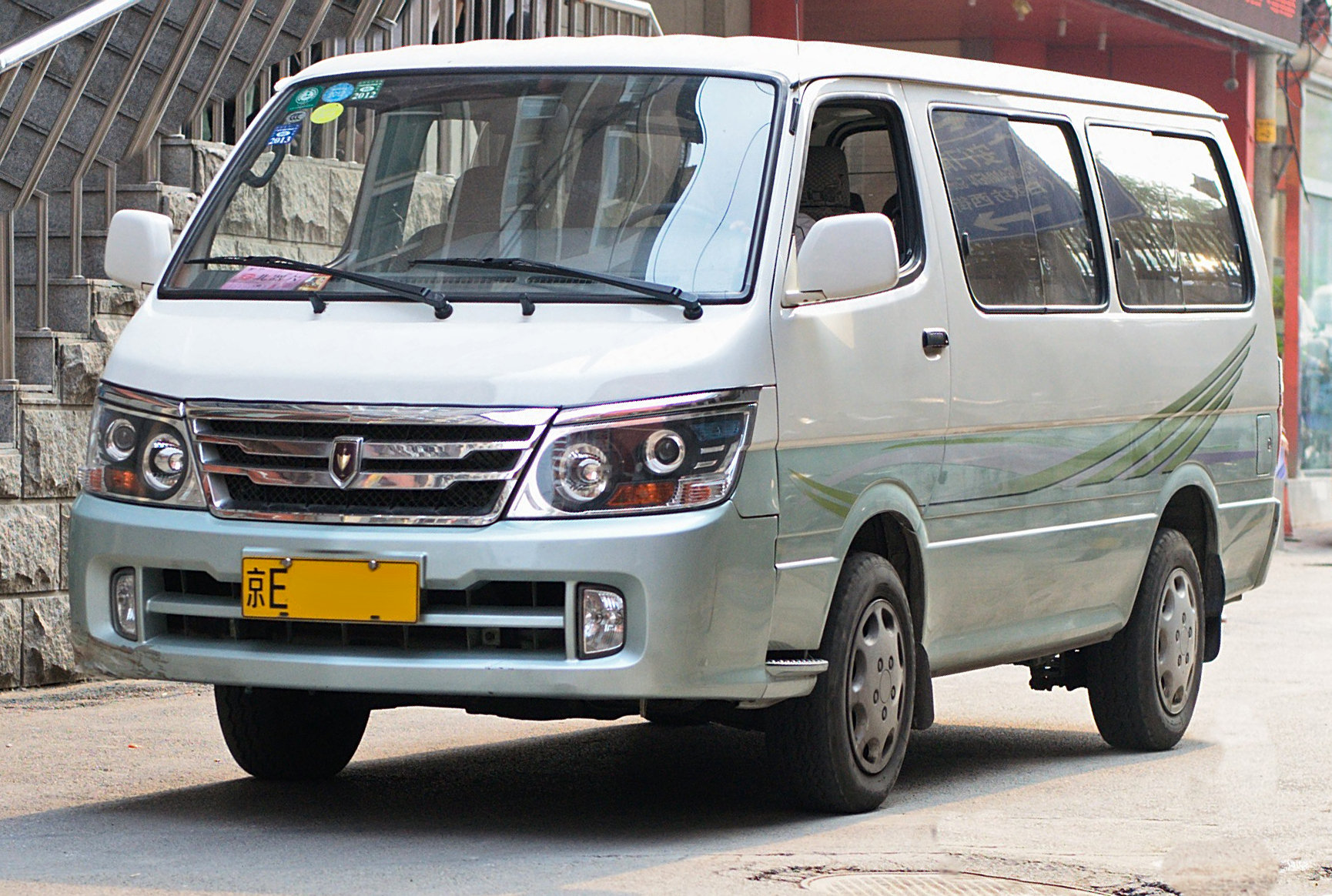
Jinbei Haise

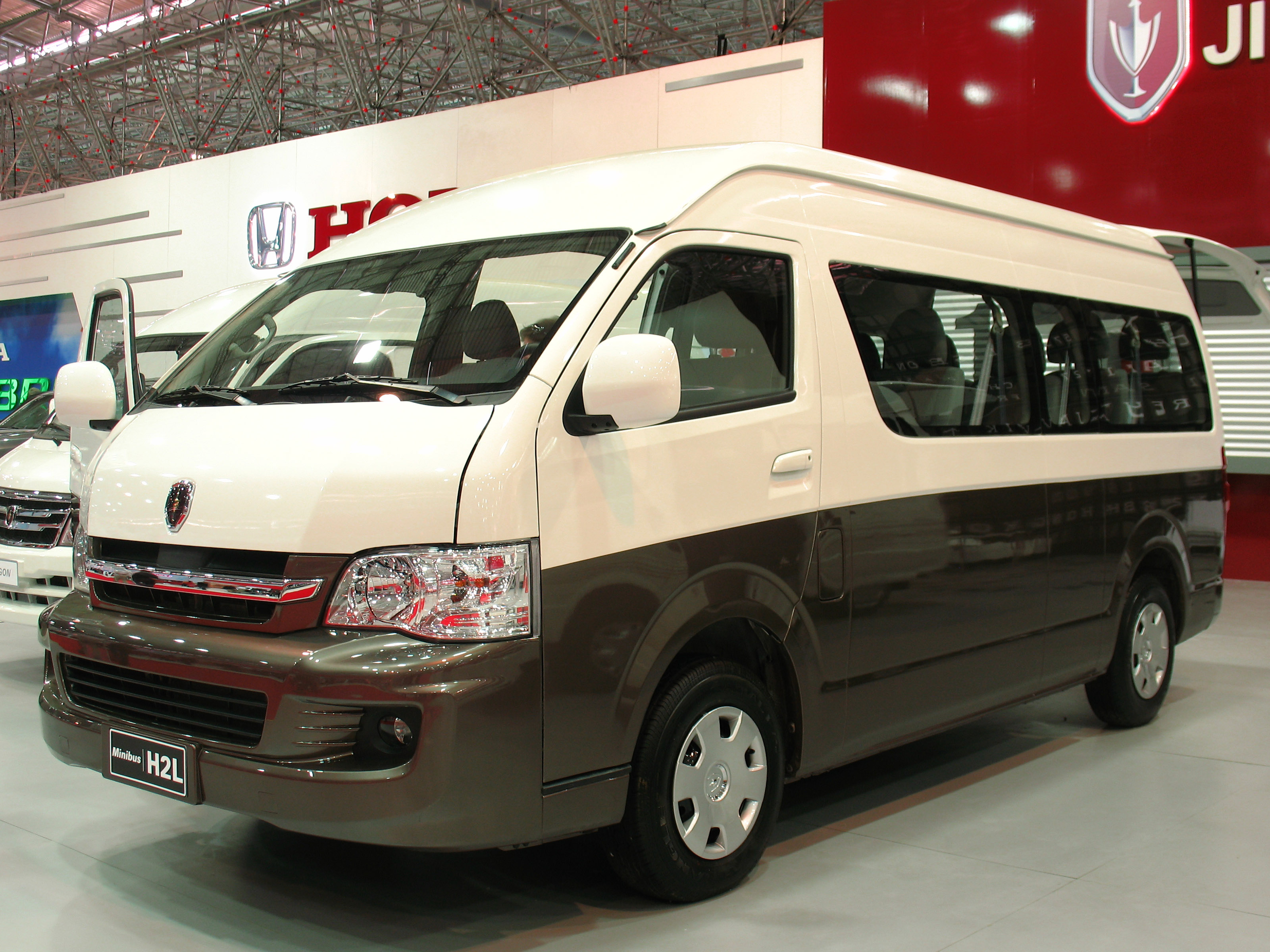
Jinbei H2L

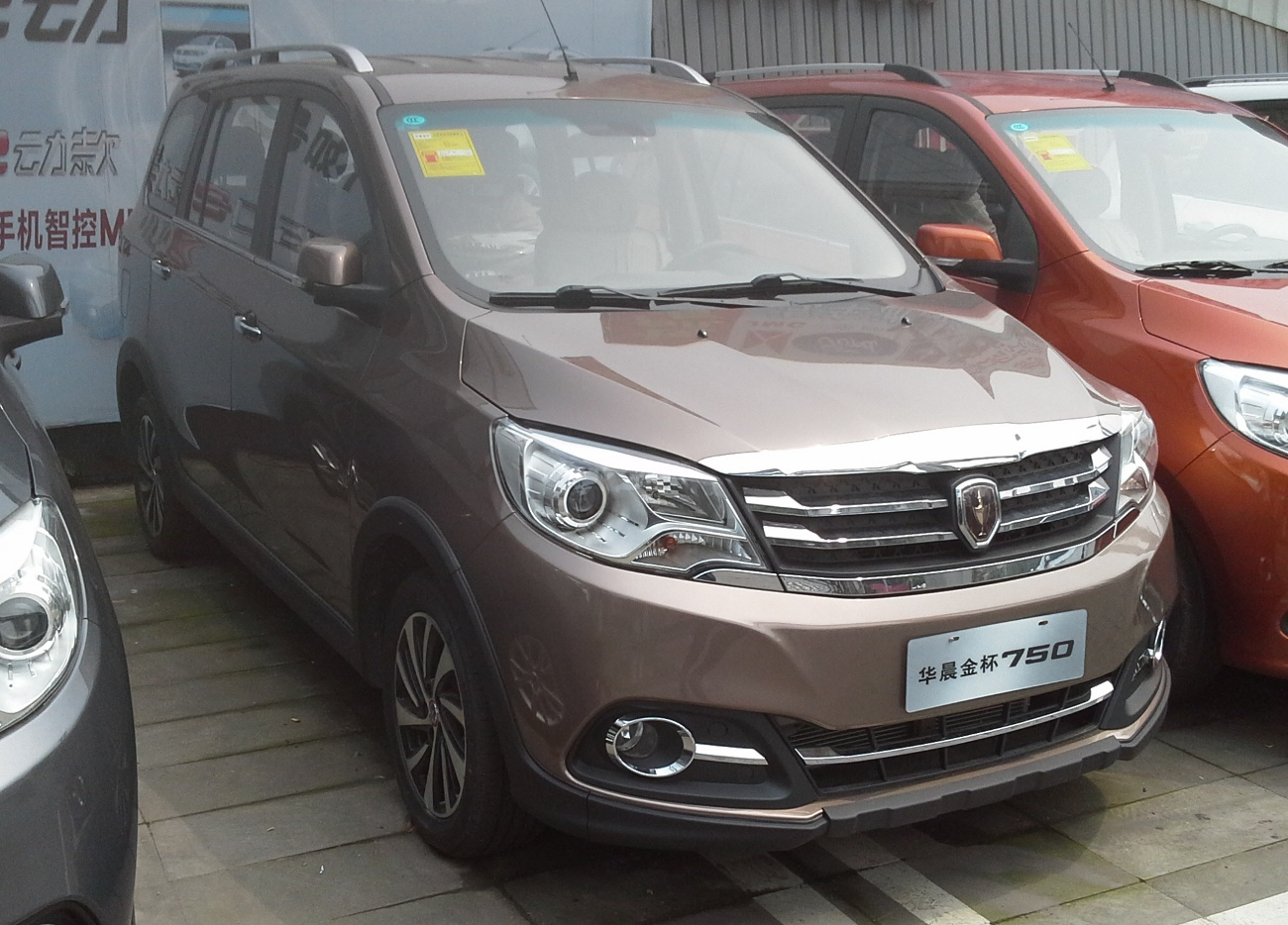
Jinbei 750

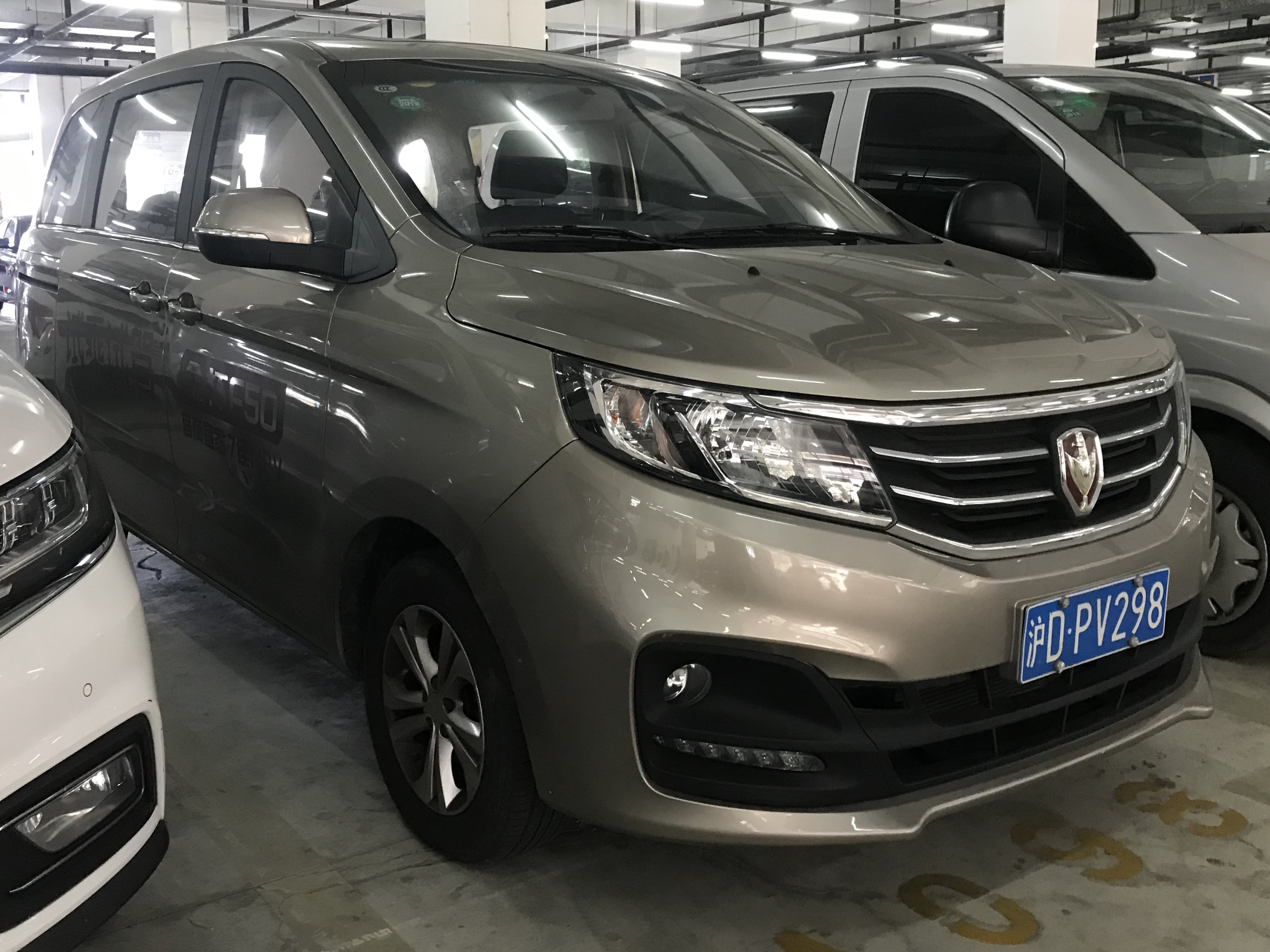
Jinbei F50

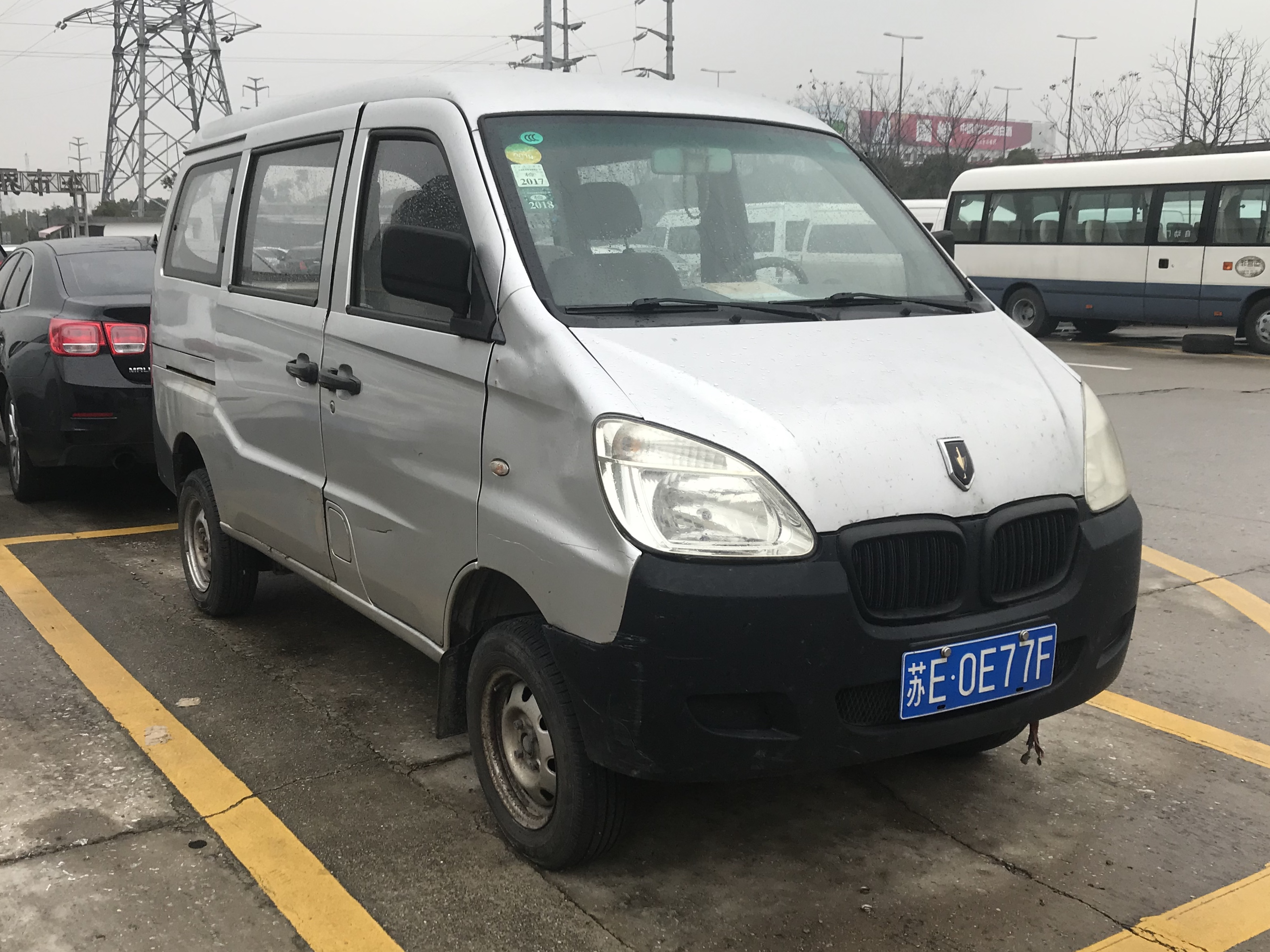
Jinbei Haixing A9

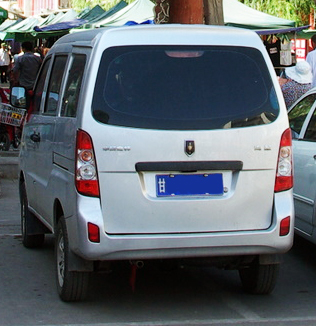
Jinbei Haixing (rear view)

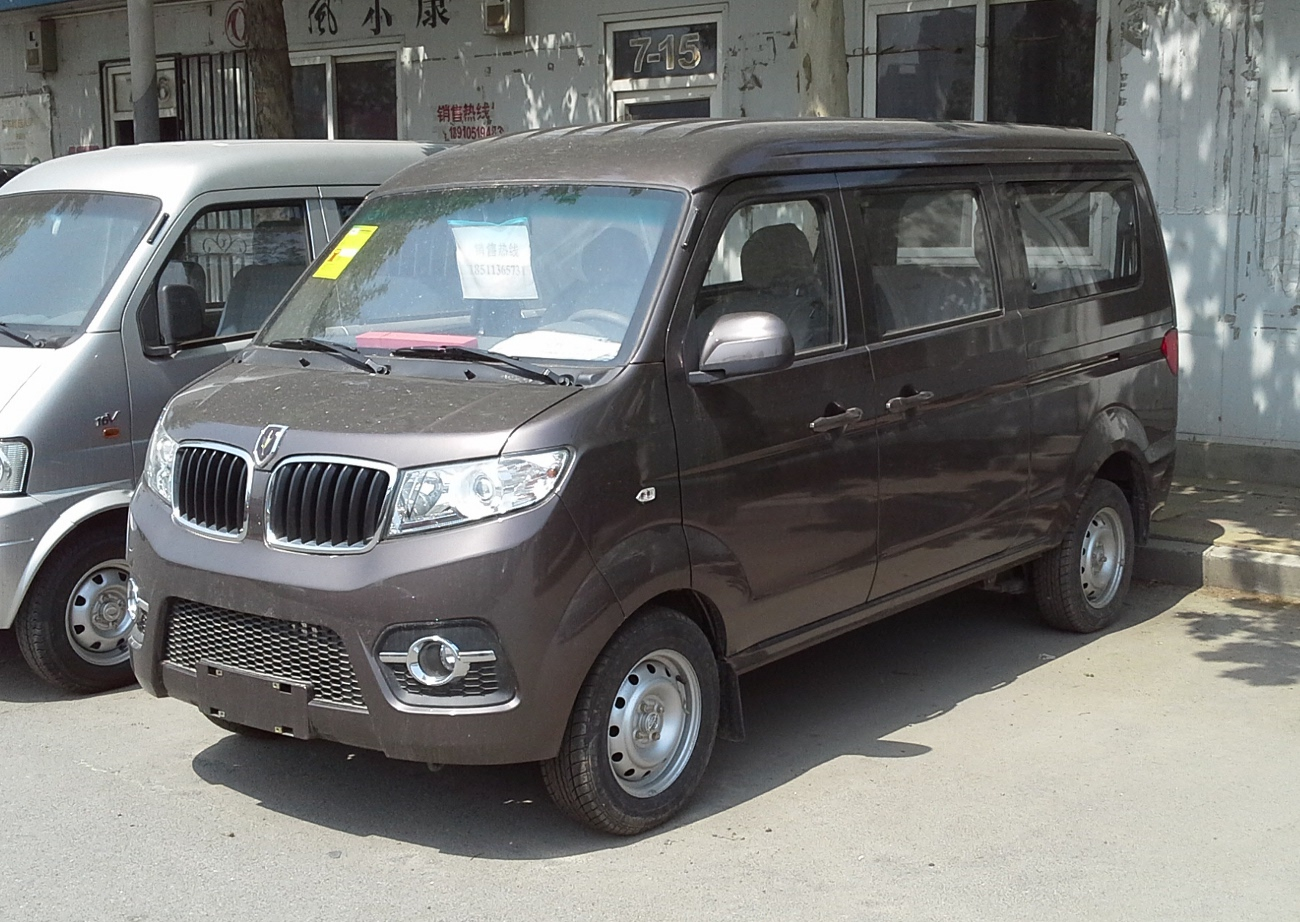
Jinbei Haixing X30

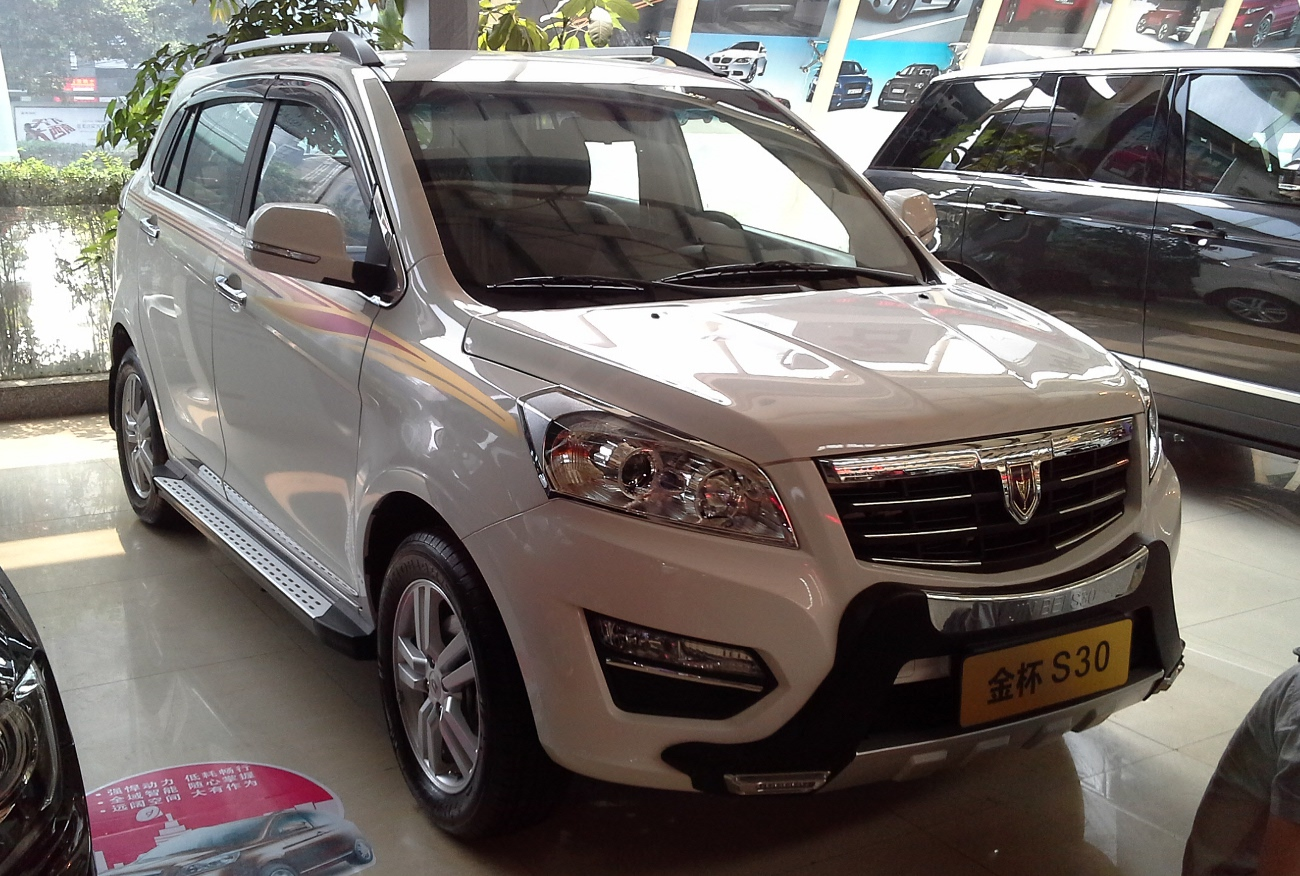
Jinbei S30

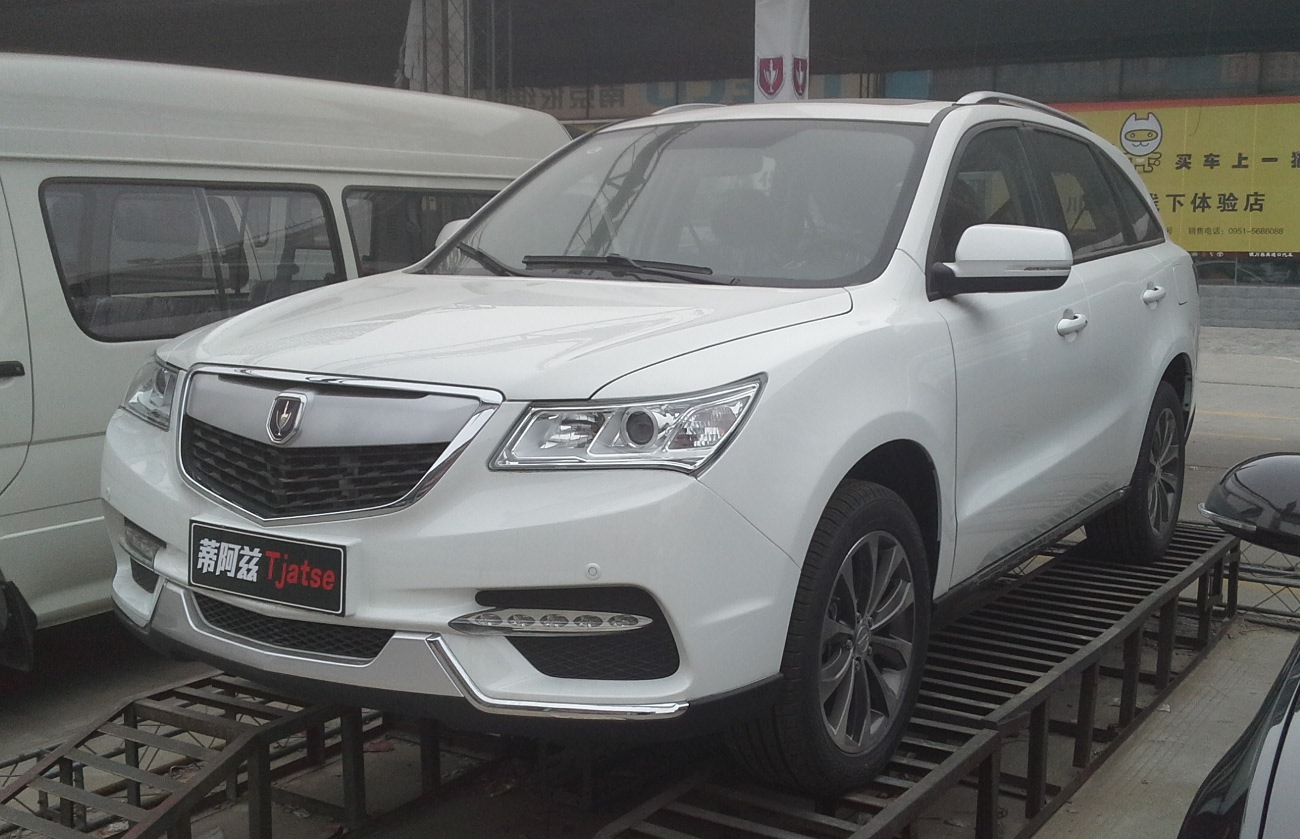
Jinbei Tjatse S70
