= Farizon Fengrui =

The Farizon Fengrui (Chinese: 锋锐) is a series of battery electric light trucks sold by Geely Auto under the commercial vehicle brand Farizon. The products of the Fengrui series include the following vehicles.

== Farizon Fengrui E200 ==
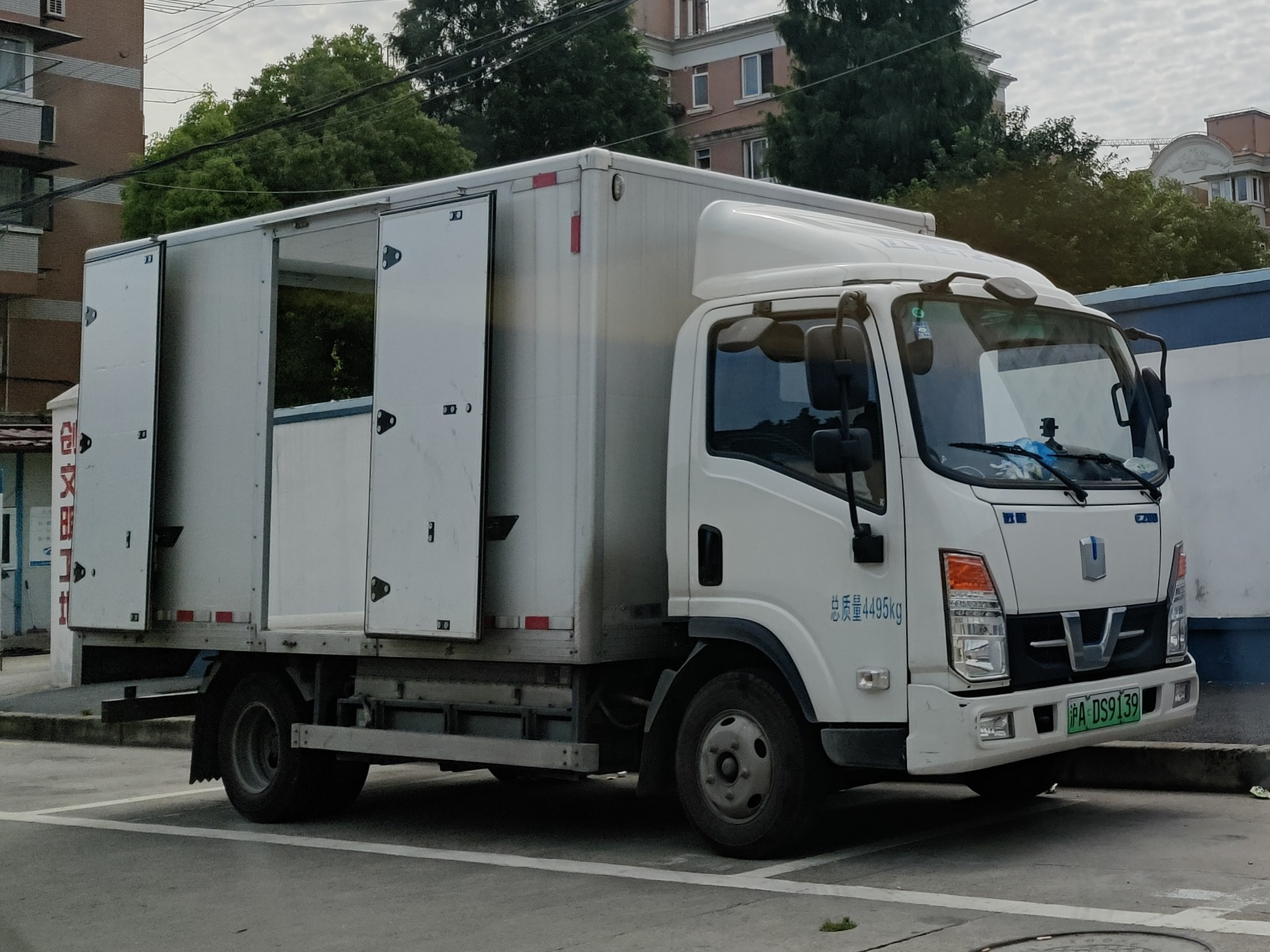
Farizon E200

== Farizon Fengrui E200S ==
The Fengrui V5E was originally sold as the E200S until 2022, and was offered as a refrigerator truck, a box van, and a flat bed pickup. All variants are equipped with a CATL supplied 66.8kWh battery.

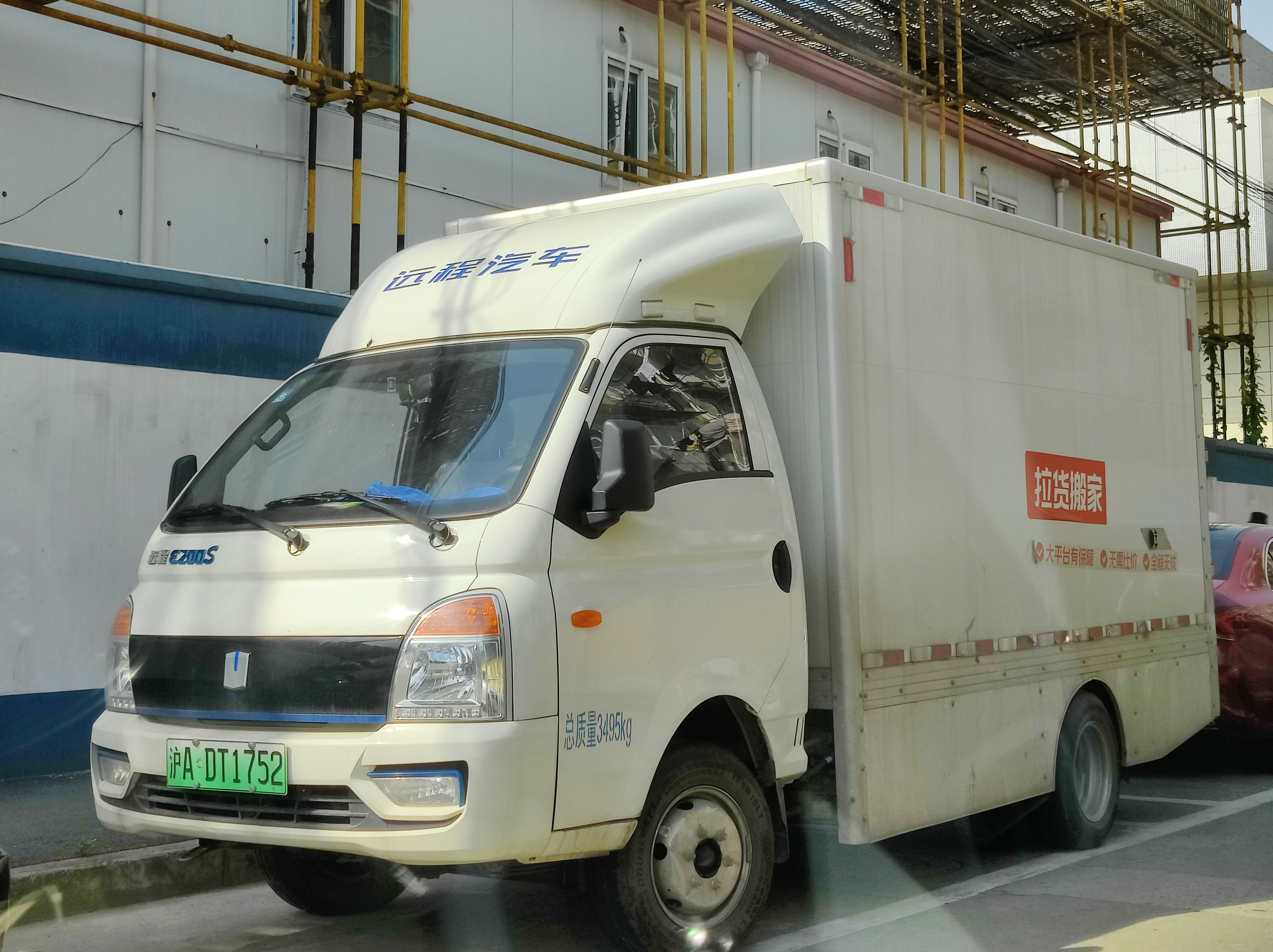
Farizon E200S

== Farizon Fengrui E200X ==
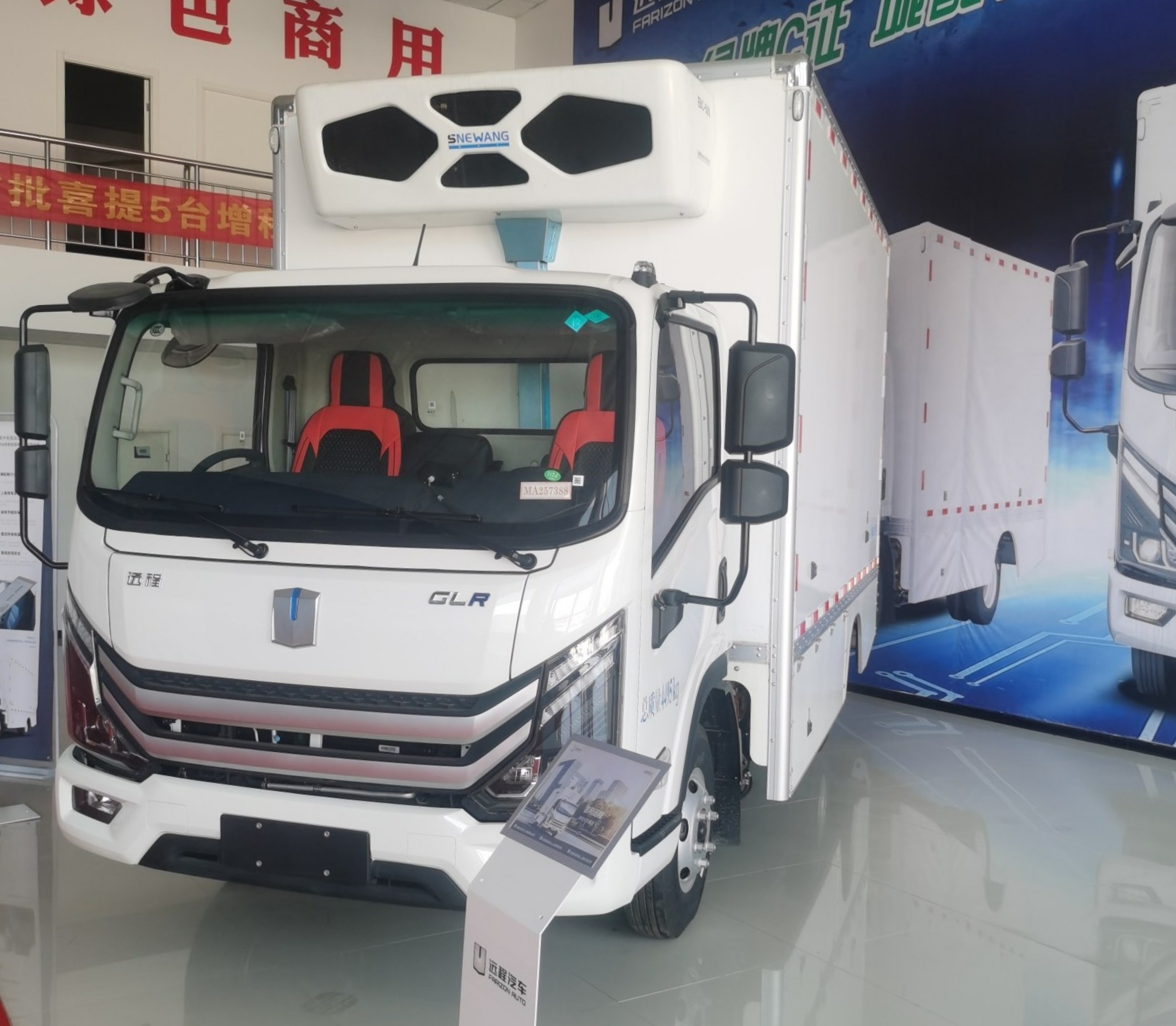
Farizon E200X

== Farizon Fengrui V5E ==
The E200S was updated and renamed as the V5E in November 2022 for the 2023 model year, with identical dimensions and bodystyles as the previous E200S. The battery is the same CATL supplied 66.8kWh battery and the electric motors produces up to 255N·m of torque.

== Farizon Fengrui F3 and F3E ==
The Ouling Fengrui F3 and the battery electric variant as the Fengrui F3E is a light truck based on tenth generation Suzuki Carry platform that was shared across multiple Chinese automobile manufacturers as their micro truck and heavy duty truck offerings. The Fengrui F3E was launched in August 2022, and is powered by a 55.7 kW battery by CATL with the electric motor producing a maximum output of 80 kW.

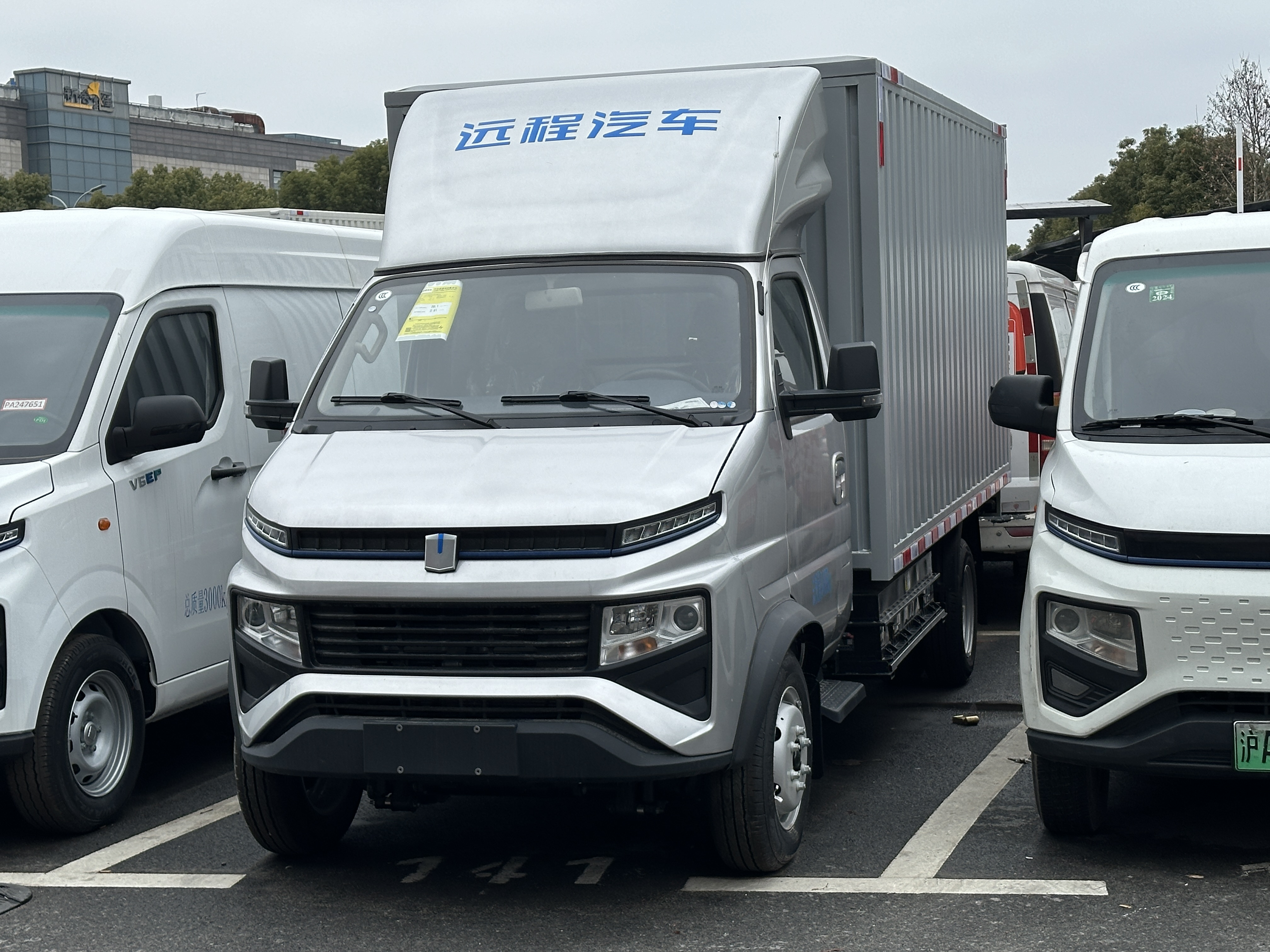
Farizon Fengrui F3E

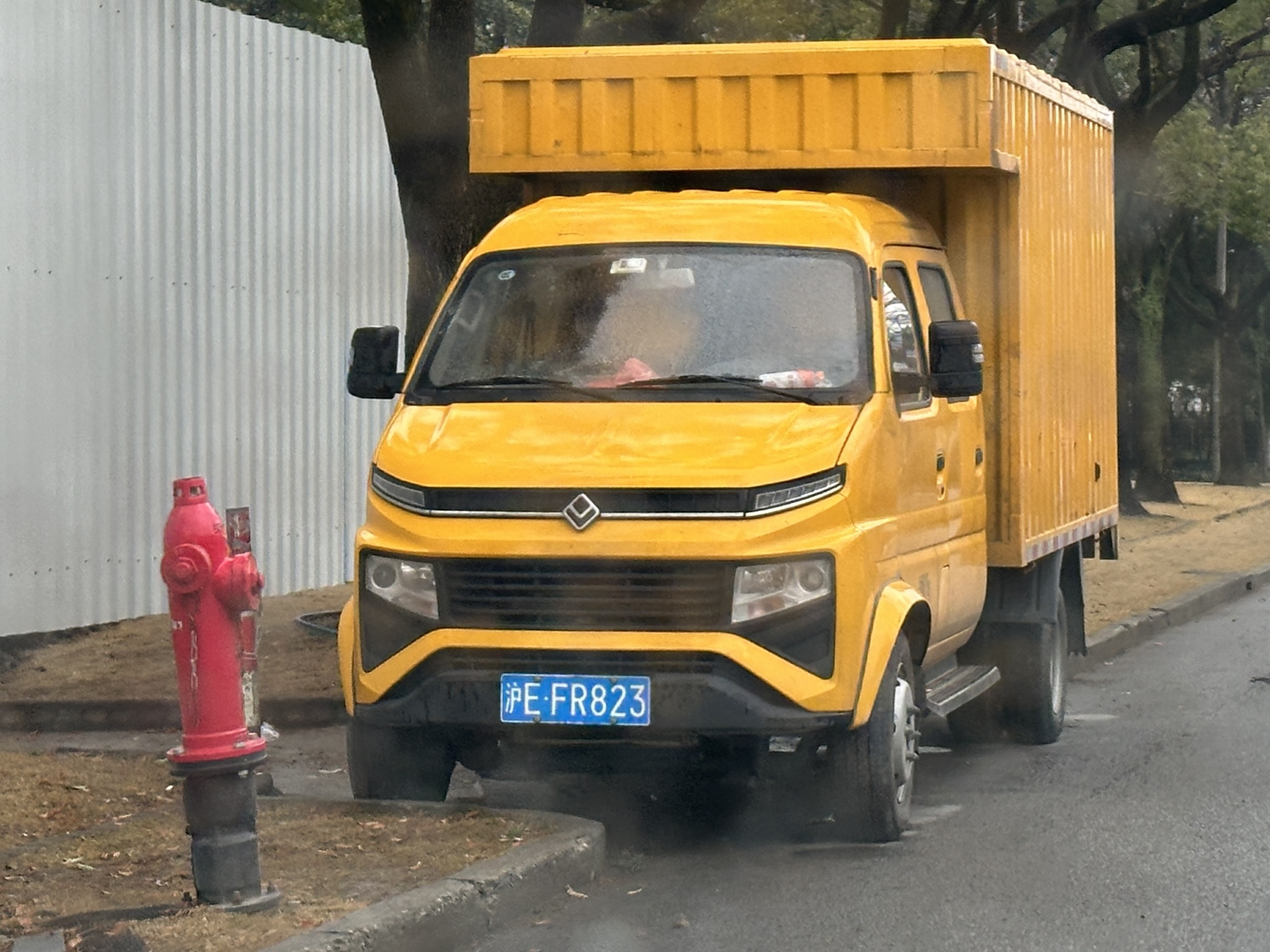
Ouling Fengrui F3
