= Farizon Xingxiang V =

Battery electric van

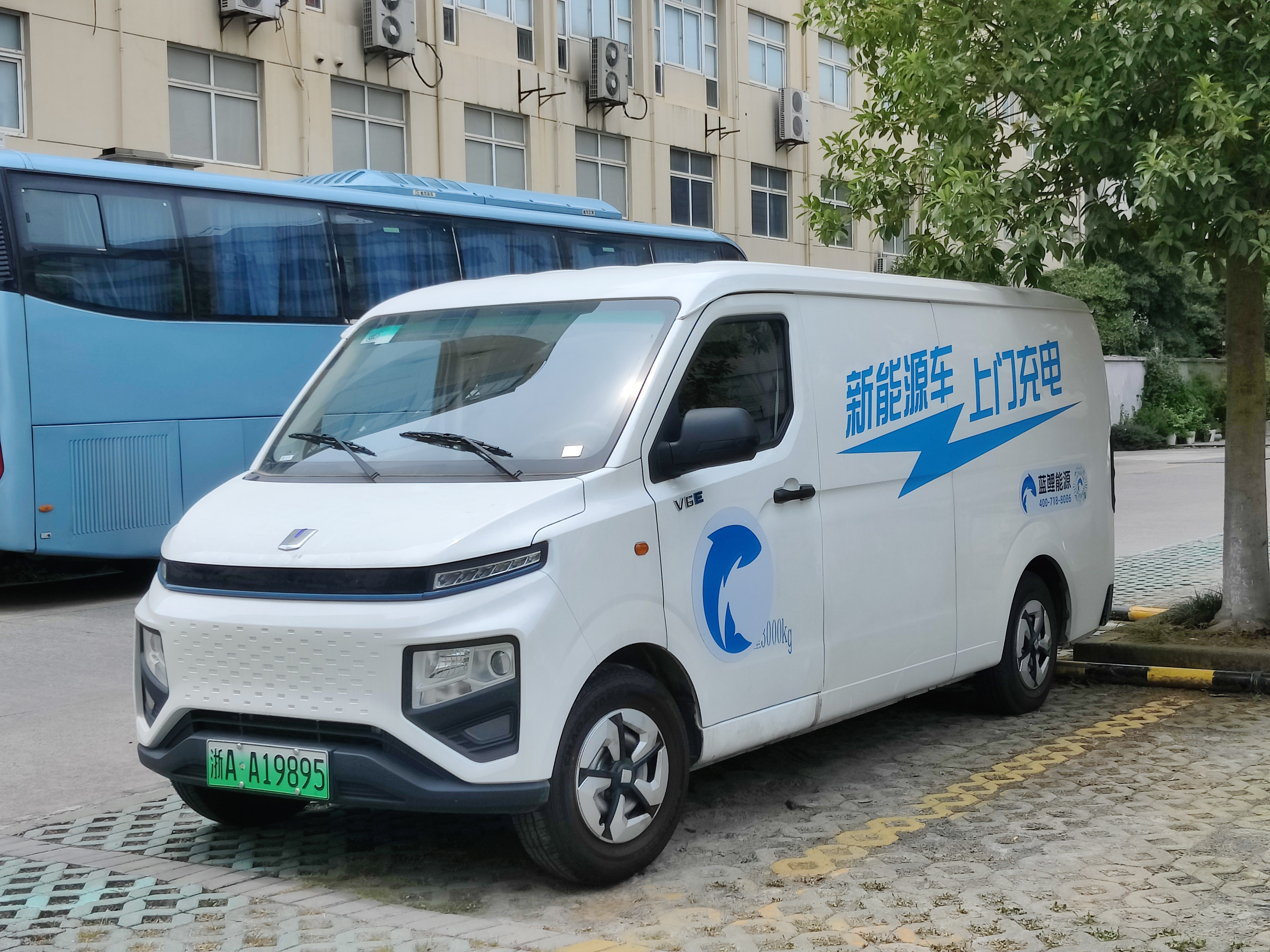
- The Farizon Xingxiang V in Hangzhou.

Overview
- Manufacturer: Farizon Auto
- Also called: Geely E51 EV; Jinbei Jiyun E6; SE-A (South Korea)
- Production: 2022–present
- Assembly: China

Body and chassis
- Class: Light commercial vehicle
- Body style: 4-door van
- Layout: Rear-engine, rear-wheel-drive
- Platform: GMA architecture

Powertrain
- Electric motor: Permanent magnet synchronous

Dimensions
- Wheelbase: 3,380 mm (133.1 in)
- Length: 4,540–4,845 mm (178.7–190.7 in)
- Width: 1,730 mm (68.1 in)
- Height: 1,895 mm (74.6 in)

The Farizon Xingxiang V (Chinese: 远程 星享V) is a battery electric van produced by the Chinese automaker Farizon from March 2022, also known as the Geely E51 EV. It was sold under the Xingxiang (星享) product series which focuses on vehicles for urban logistics.

== Overview ==
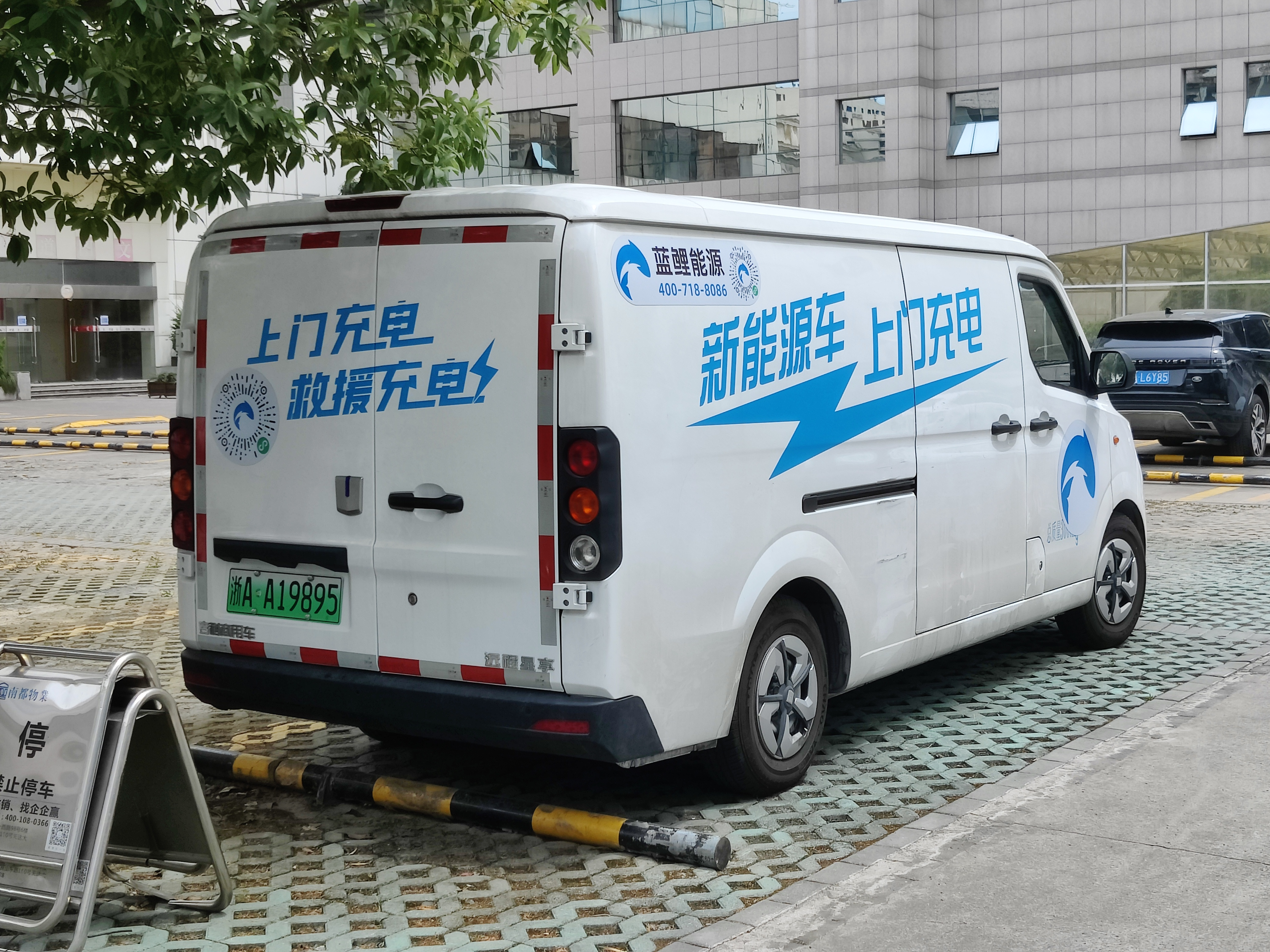
Rear view

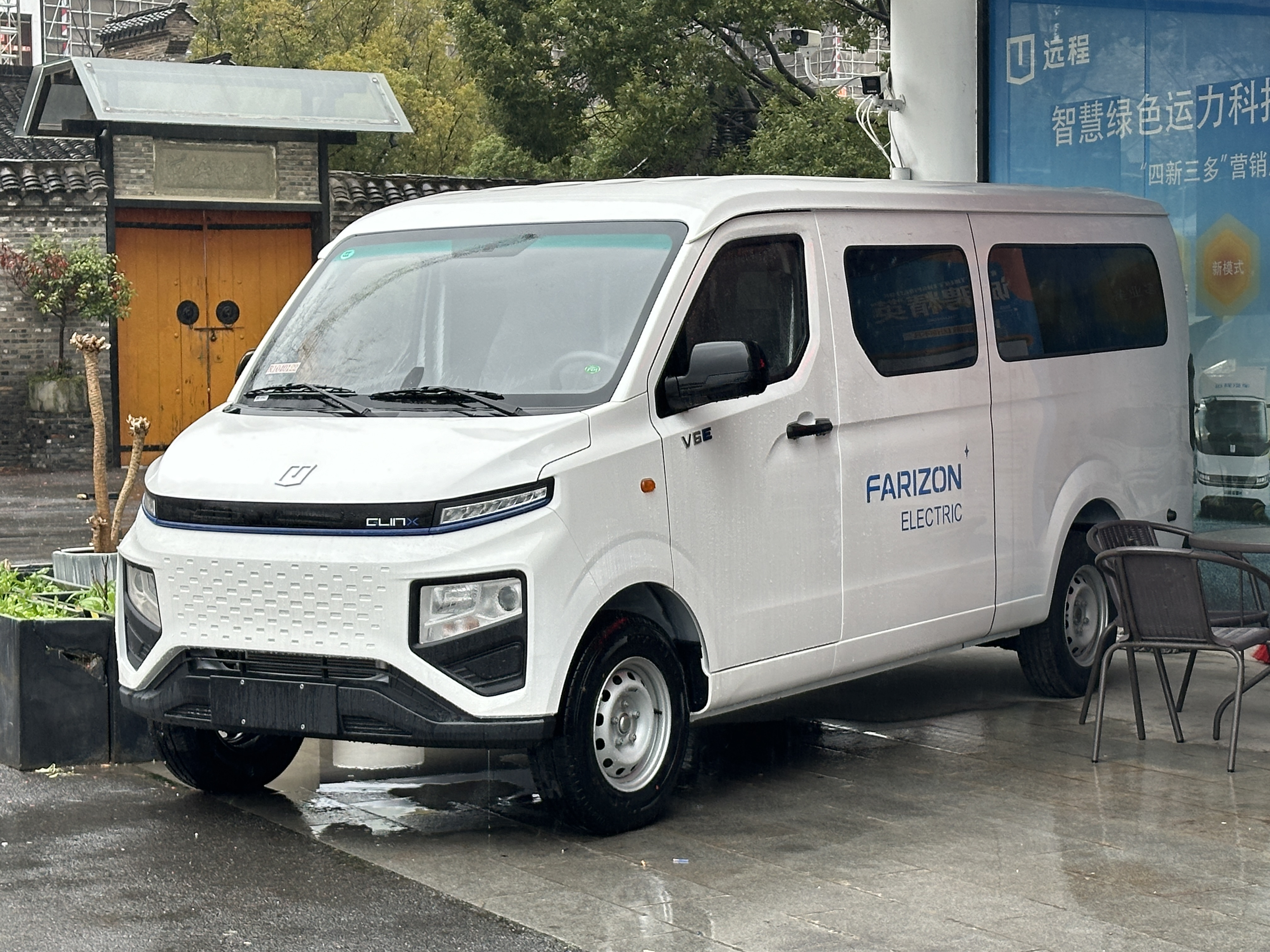
Farizon Xingxiang V6E

The Farizon Xingxiang V is a fully electric urban logistics microvan by Farizon Auto, specially designed for the needs of urban logistics and distribution. Two variants are available, with the Xingxiang V5E being in the microvan segment and the longer Xingxiang V6E being in the light commercial vehicles segment.

In February 2022, Farizon Auto signed a strategic partnership agreement with Korea's Farizon Auto Myoung Shin Co. Ltd., with the Farizon Xingxiang V being the first product under the partnership and would be produced and sold in Korea.

== Specifications ==
The Xingxiang V is powered by a 60 kW permanent magnet synchronous electric motor positioned over the rear axle, with the output of which reaching 82 hp, and 220 Nm of torque. A 41.86 kWh lithium iron phosphate flat battery pack supplied by CATL is located right under the floor. The top speed is 90 km/h.

The Xingxiang V is built on the GMA architecture with OTA compatibility and features a 1600mm-wide cargo area with the volume of the cargo compartment reaching 6 cubic meters. A full charge gives the van 260 km of range and a fast charger could charge the vehicle from 20% to 80% in under 50 minutes.

== Farizon Xingxiang V7E (First generation, 2024–2025) and V6E 2026 (facelift) ==
The Farizon Xingxiang V7E is the larger and more premium version of the Farizon Xingxiang V6E featuring a restyled front end. The Xingxiang V7E was launched in April 2024, and has a range of 305 km. Several more upmarket 2024 model year V6E trim levels also share the same exterior appearance. A V6F 10 year anniversary variant featuring a gold badge was available for the 2024 model year.

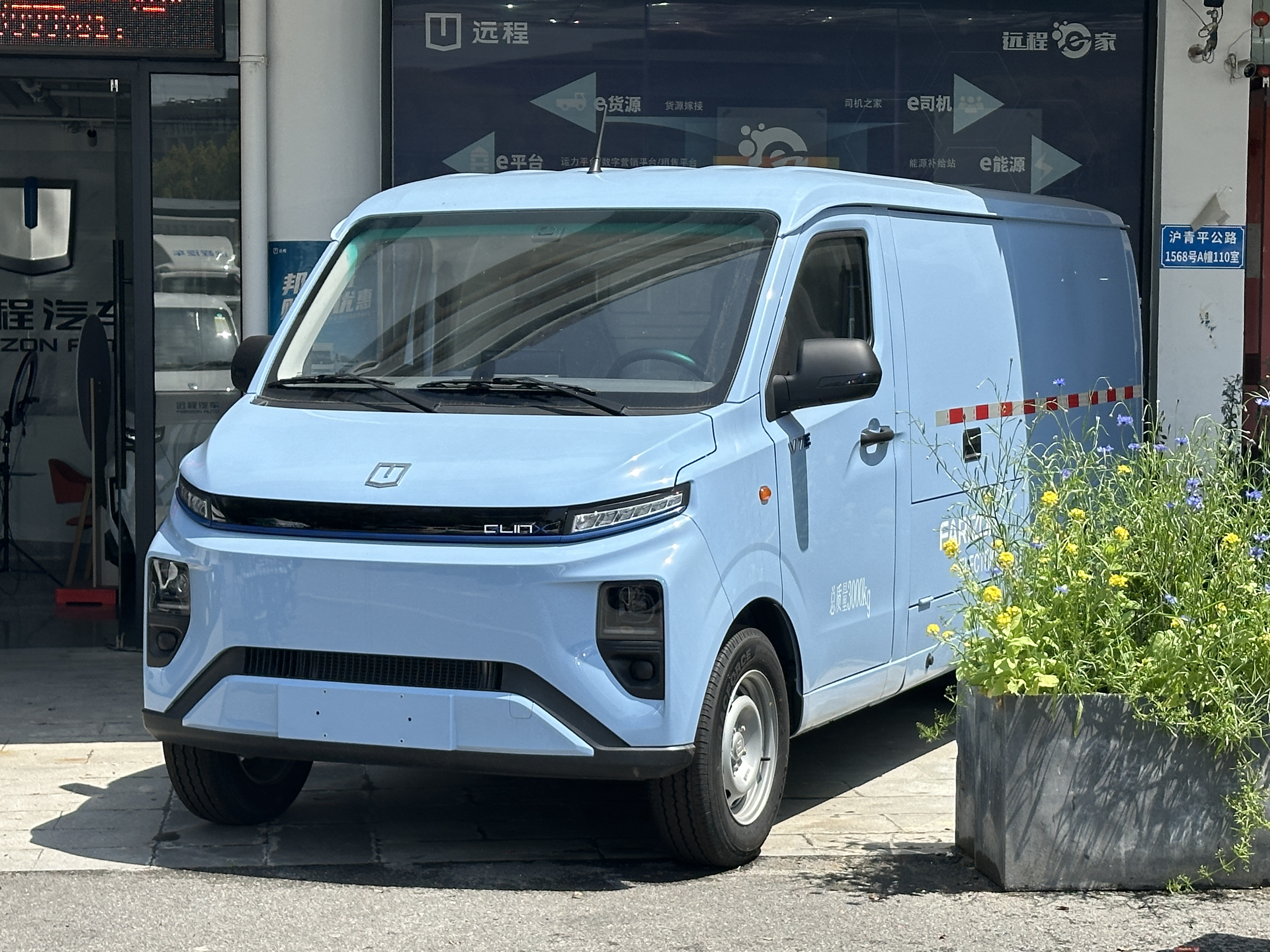
Farizon Xingxiang V7E

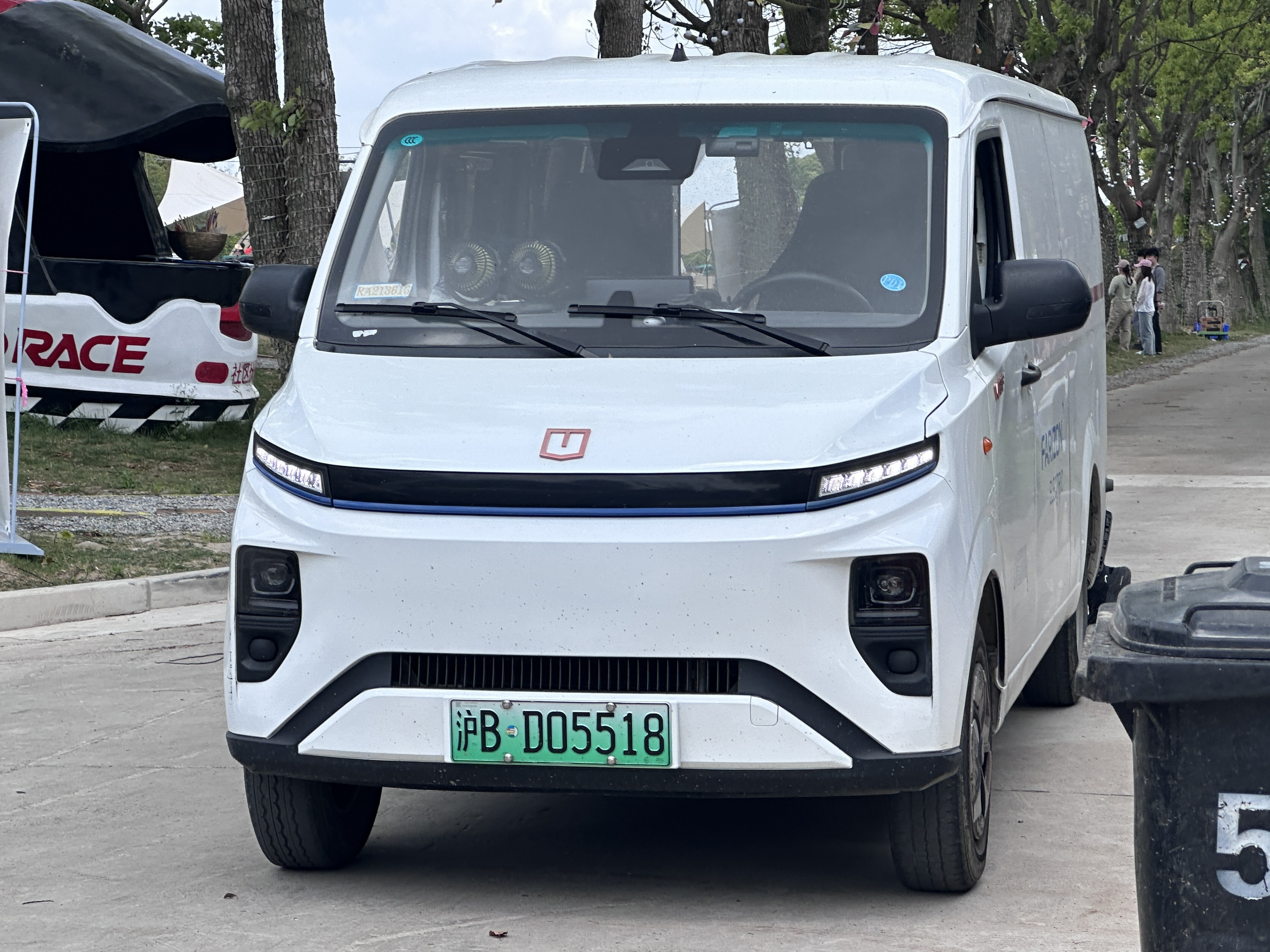
Farizon Xingxiang V6F

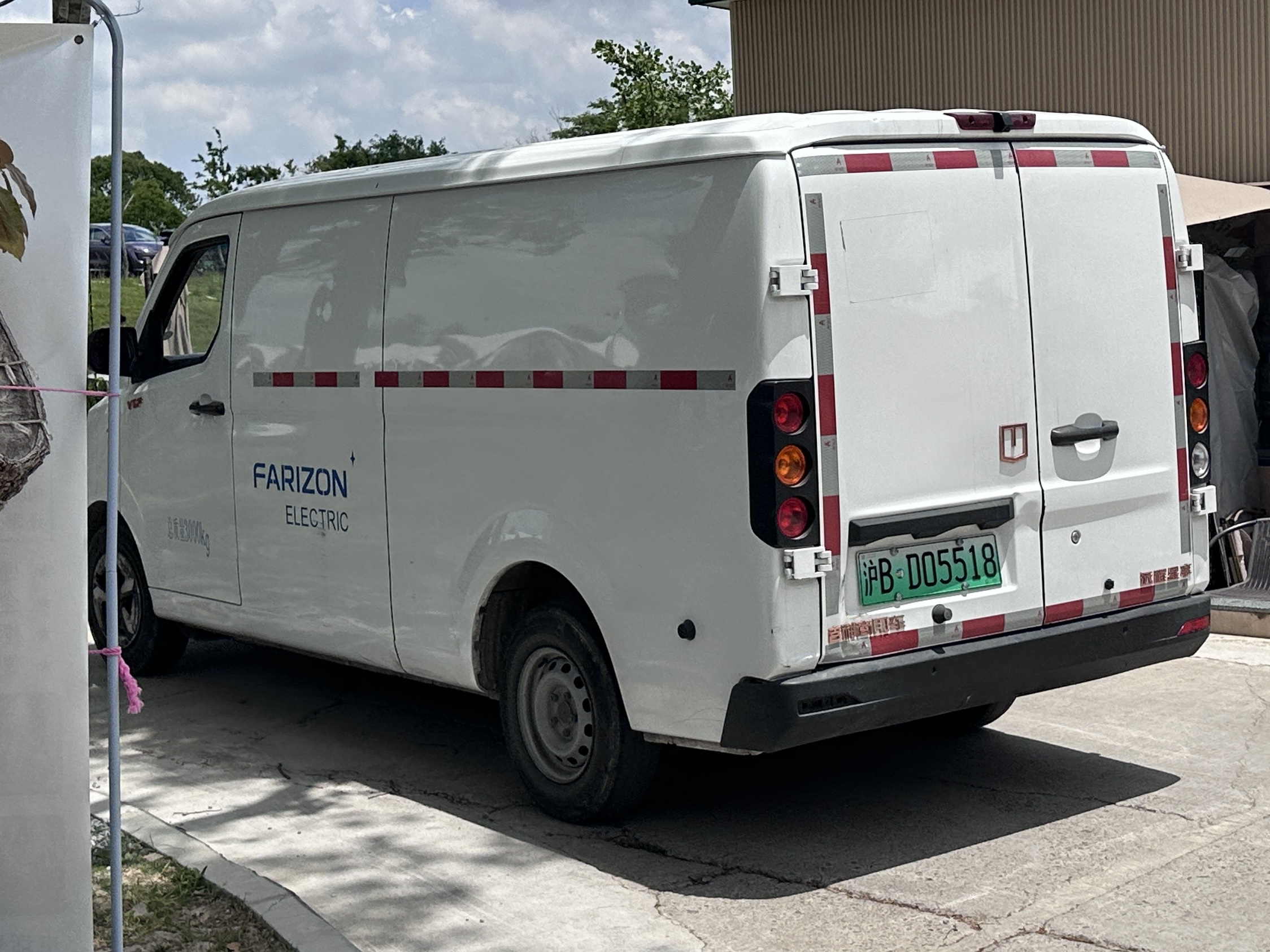
Rear view

Starting from July 2025, the V7E was updated with a completely new design all around and became an independent model.

== Farizon Xingxiang F1E ==
The Farizon Xingxiang F1E is the pickup version of the Farizon Xingxiang V6E featuring a restyled front bumper. The Xingxiang F1E was launched in June 2023, and is powered by either a 41 kW or 46kWh battery by CATL with the electric motor producing a maximum output of 60 kW.

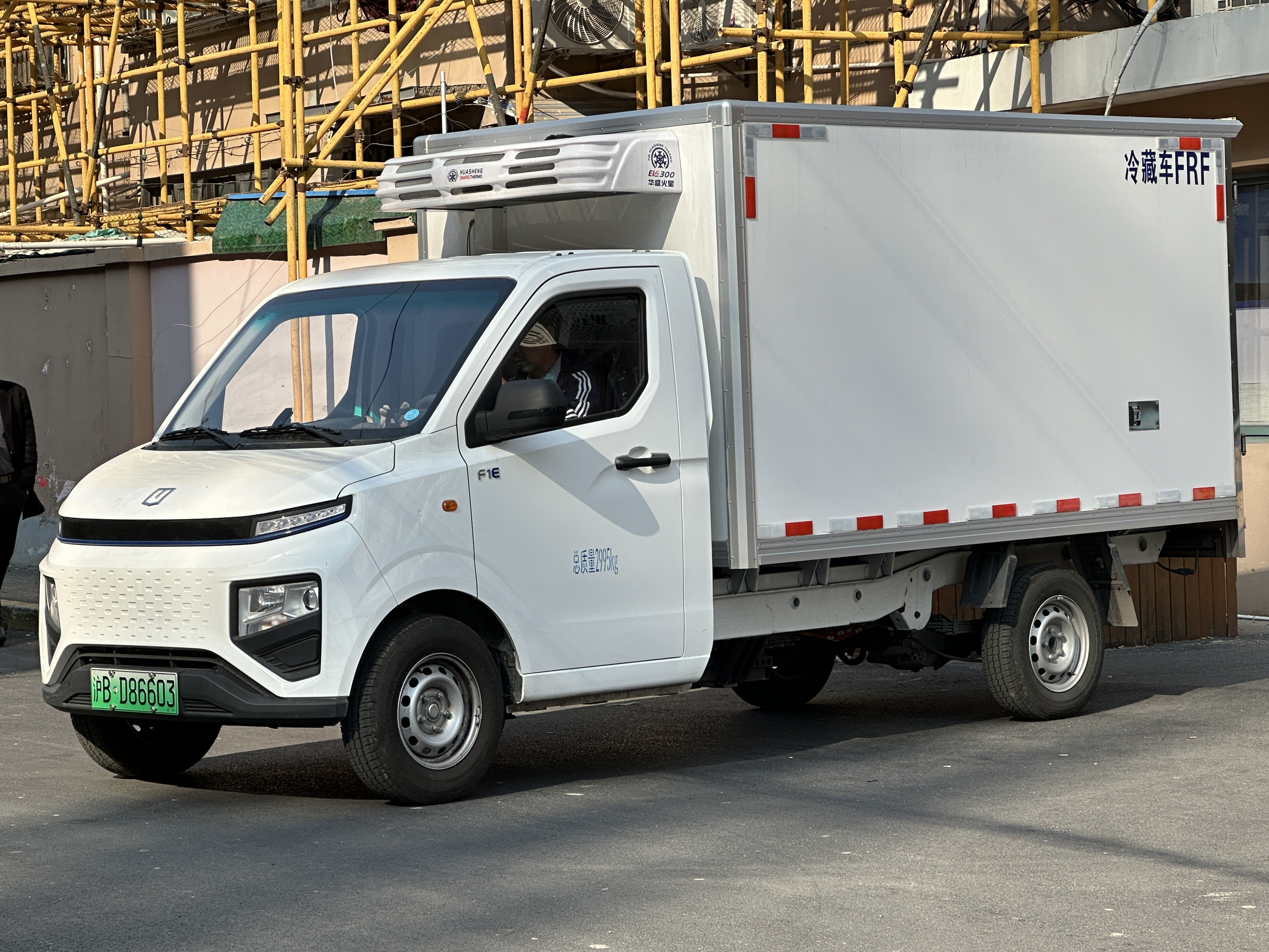
Farizon Xingxiang F1E (box truck)

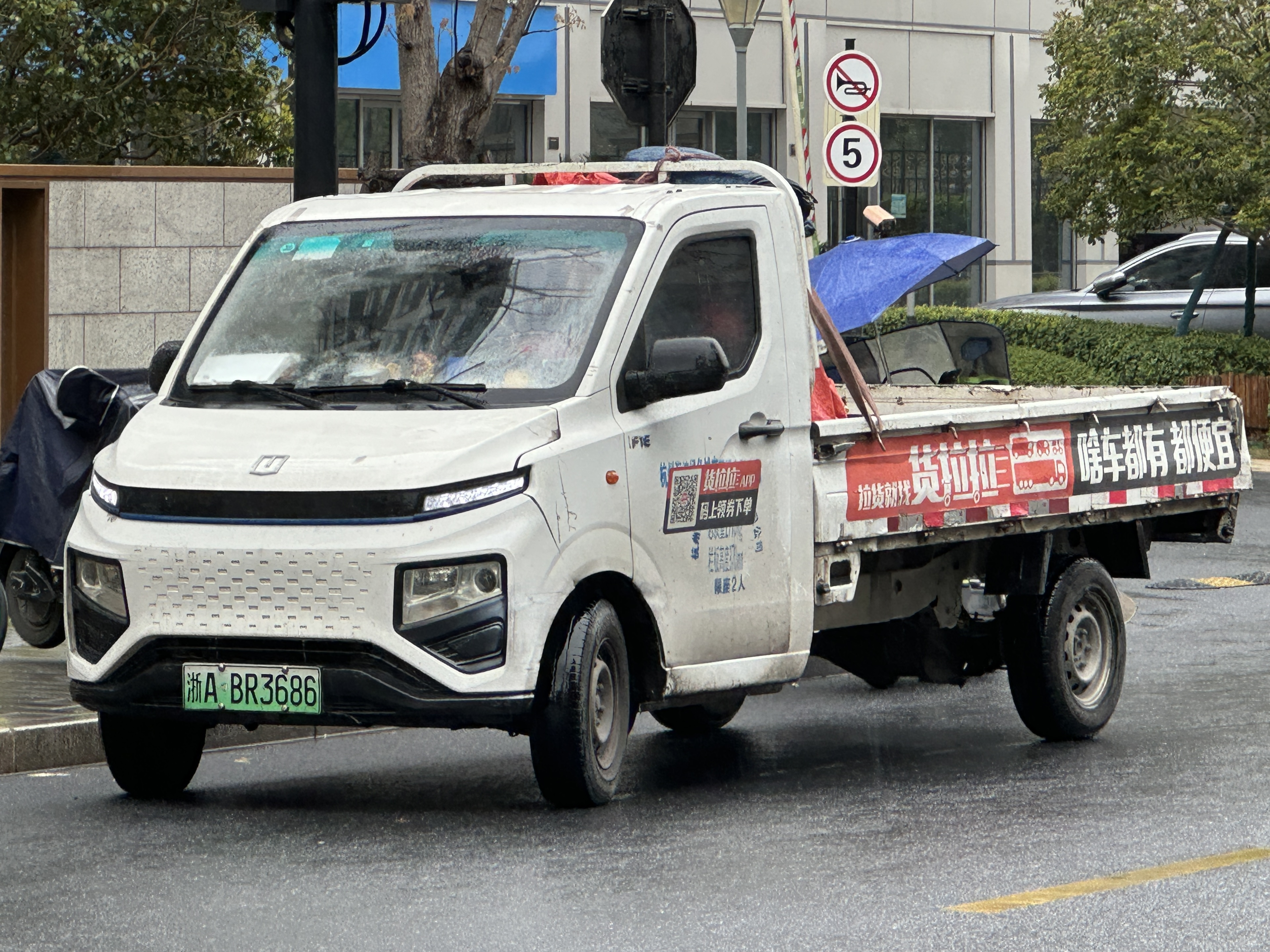
Farizon Xingxiang F1E (pickup)

== Jinbei Jiyun E6 ==
The Jinbei Jiyun E6 (金杯 吉运E6) is a rebadged variant of the Farizon Xingxiang V launched in December 2024 by Jinbei in cooperation with Geely.

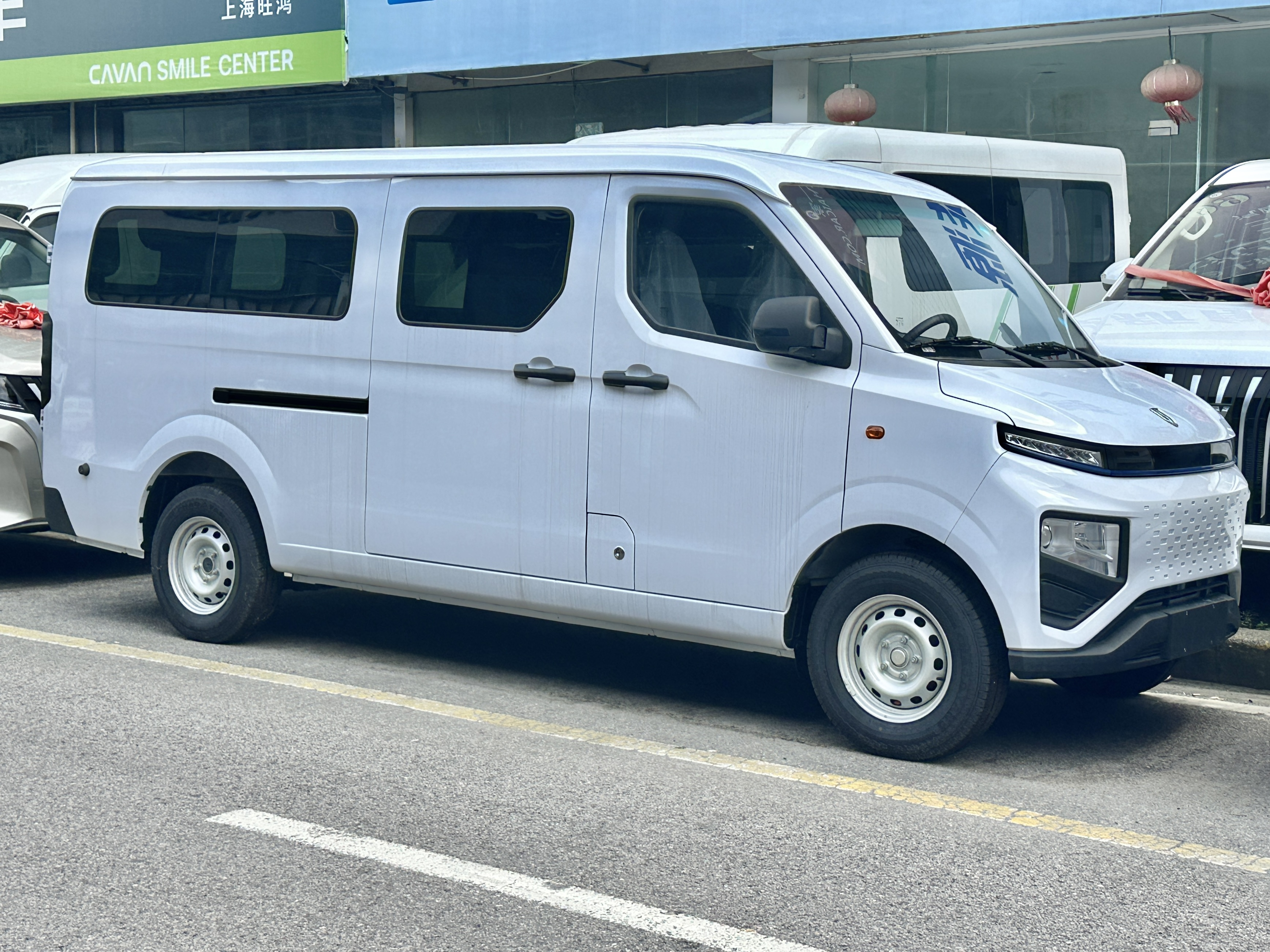
Jinbei Jiyun E6

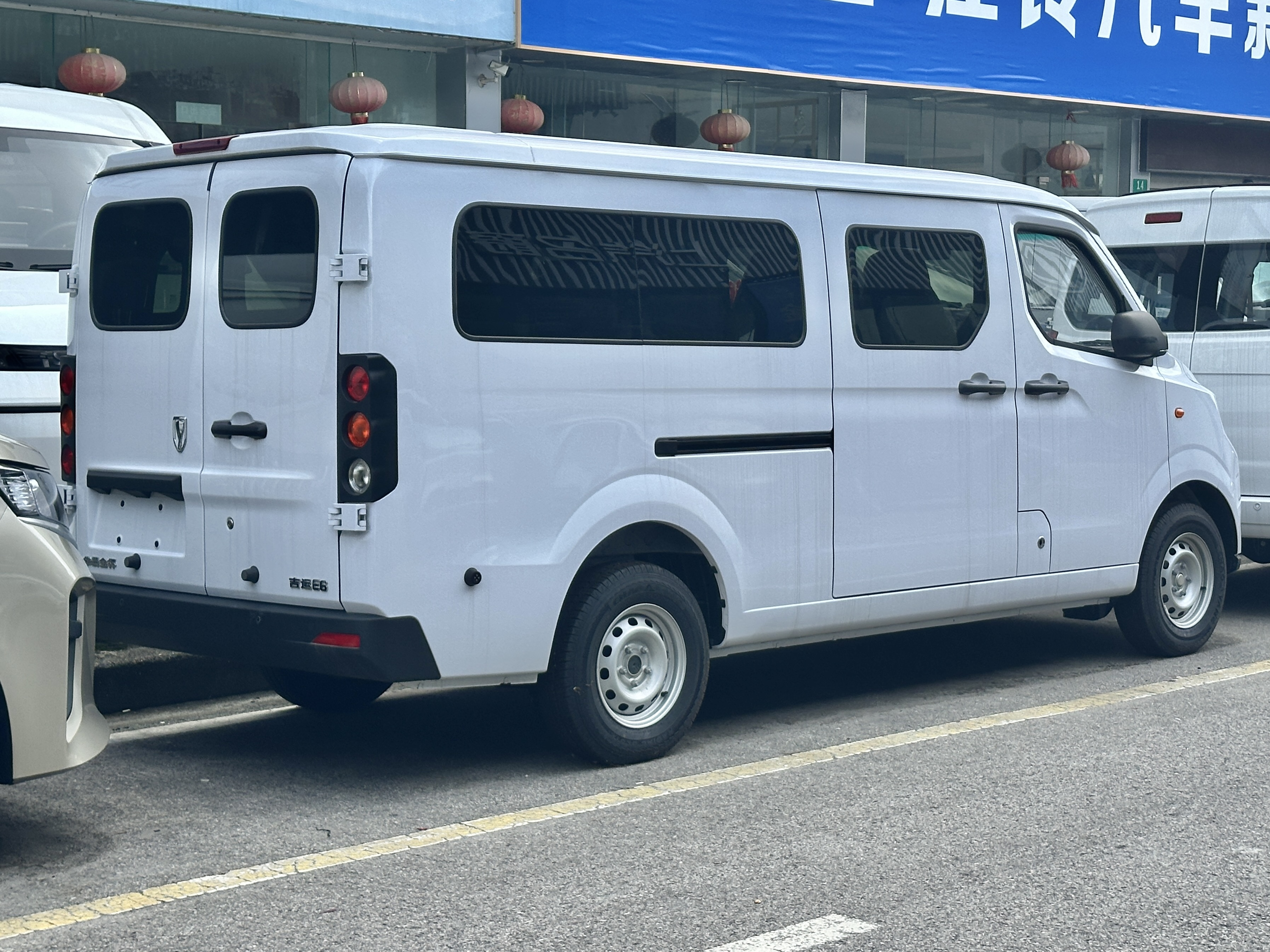
Rear view

== SE-A ==
The Farizon Xingxiang V was sold in South Korea by Mobility Networks as the SE-A.

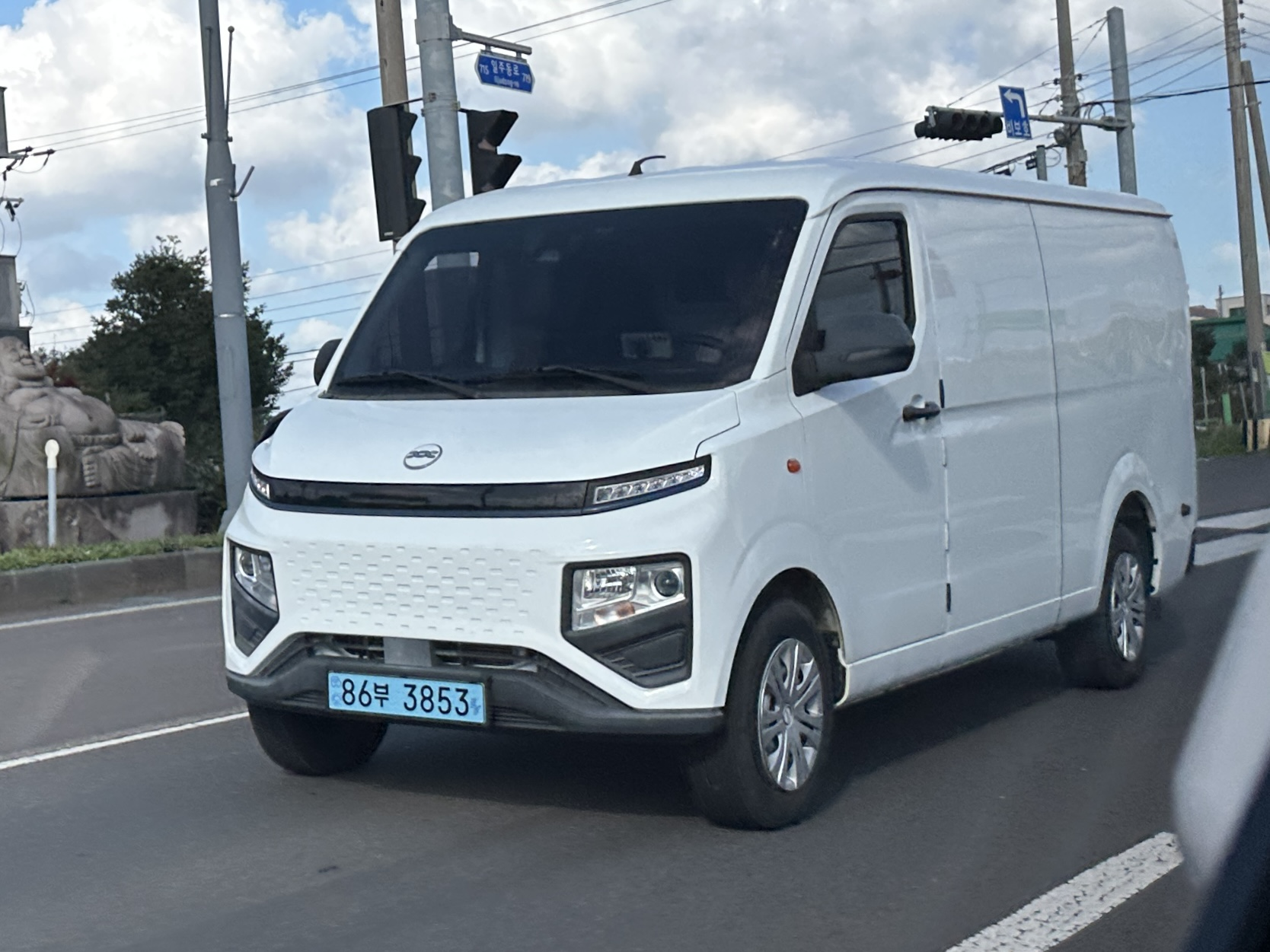
SE-A
