= Farizon Auto =

Chinese motor vehicle brand

- Formerly: Geely New Energy Commercial Vehicle Group
- Type: Subsidiary
- Industry: Automotive
- Founded: 2016; 10 years ago
- Headquarters: Hangzhou, China
- Area served: Worldwide
- Key people: Fan Xianjun (CEO)
- Products: Automobiles
- Parent: Zhejiang Geely Holding (100%)
- Website: geelycv.com

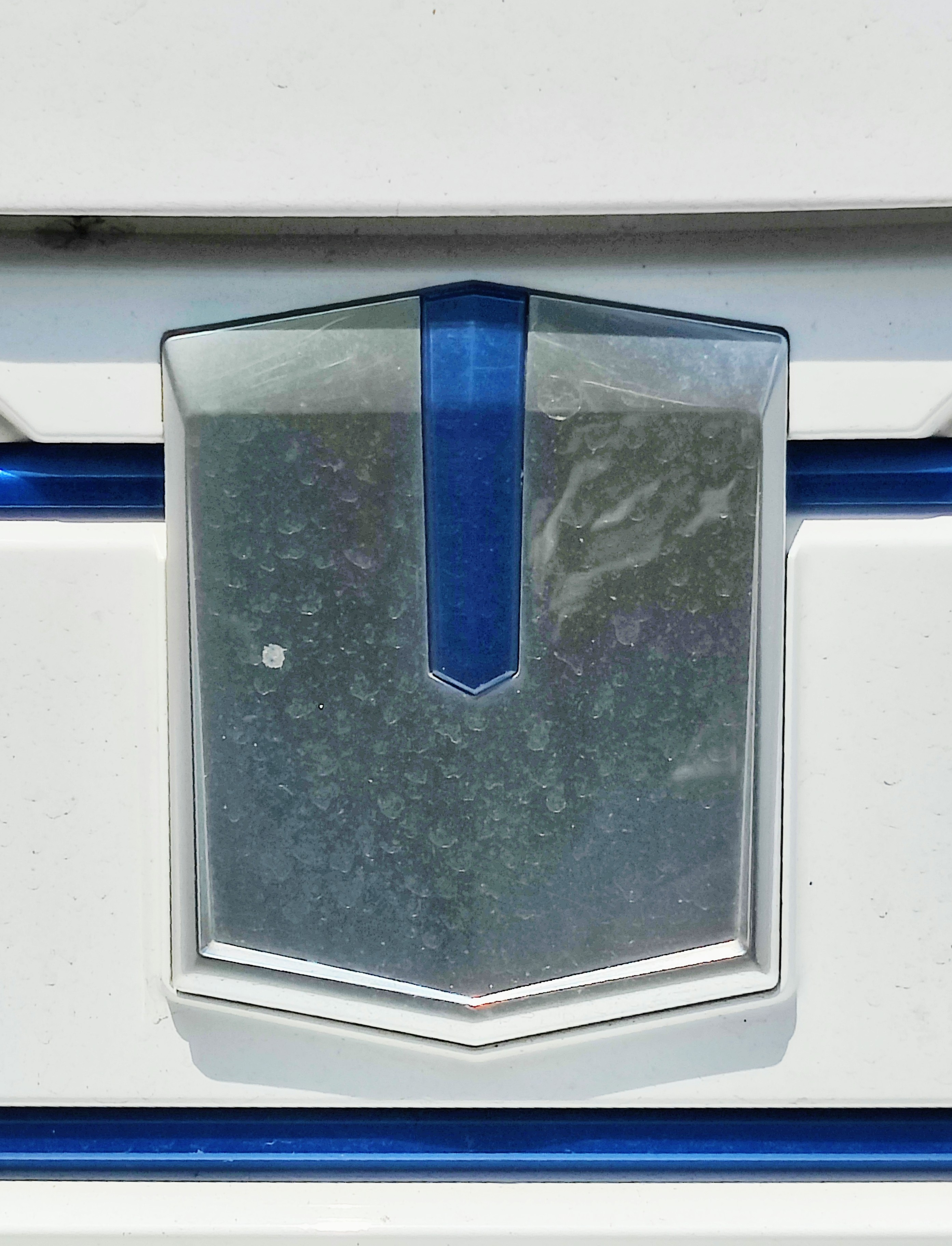
A Farizon Auto badge on one of its vehicles

Farizon Auto, officially Zhejiang Geely Farizon New Energy Commercial Vehicle Group is a Chinese automaker. Focused on manufacturing commercial vehicles, Farizon is a subsidiary of major Chinese automotive company Geely. As of 2026, its vehicles are sold in numerous global markets.

== History ==
Farizon Auto was founded in 2016. Its first products were a fully-electric light commercial vehicle, and a city bus.

The company raised over $300 million in a Pre-A Round in October 2022 led by GLP's investment arm Hidden Hill Capital, and $600 million in a Series A funding round in July 2023, led by Boyu Capital and Yuexiu Industrial Fund.

The factory was later acquired by the Chinese electric commercial vehicle company Yuancheng Auto, which in conjunction with Myoung Shin. The company plans to manufacture CKD-made electric trucks for the China market.

In May 2024, it was announced that it would give up production of finished vehicles and switch to the automobile parts and automation equipment business.

== Operations ==
As of mid-2026, aside from within China, Farizon Auto vehicles are sold in numerous global markets, including South Africa, the United Kingdom, and Portugal.

== Products ==
=== Farizon Auto ===
- Farizon FX – pickup truck
- Farizon C8E/ C9E/ C10E/ C12E/ C13E/ C12DD – city buses
- Farizon U11E/ U11F – tour buses
- Farizon Xinghan G – electric and hydrogen heavy duty trucks
- Farizon Xinghan H – electric and hydrogen heavy duty trucks
- Farizon Xingzhi H– new energy light trucks
  - Farizon Xingzhi H8E – light duty truck (BEV)
  - Farizon Xingzhi H8M – light duty truck (methanol range extended)
  - Farizon Xingzhi H8R – light duty truck (range extended)
  - Farizon Xingzhi H9E – light duty truck (BEV)
  - Farizon Xingzhi H9M – light duty truck (methanol range extended)
- Farizon SV (Supervan) – electric van
  - Farizon Xingfuhao – electric MPV
- Farizon E5 – electric cargo and panel vans
- Farizon E5L – electric cargo and panel vans
- Farizon E6 – electric cargo and panel vans
- Farizon Xingxiang V series – electric cargo and panel vans
  - Farizon Xingxiang V6E – micro van
  - Farizon Xingxiang V6E Plus – micro van
  - Farizon Xingxiang F1E – micro truck
- Farizon Xingxiang V7E– electric cargo and panel vans
  - Farizon Xingzhi F3E – electric micro truck
- Farizon Fengrui series – light trucks and micro trucks
  - Farizon Fengrui V5E – electric truck
  - Farizon Fengrui F3E – electric truck
  - Farizon Fengrui E200S – light truck
  - Farizon Fengrui E200X – medium-duty truck
  - Farizon Fengrui E200 – medium-duty truck
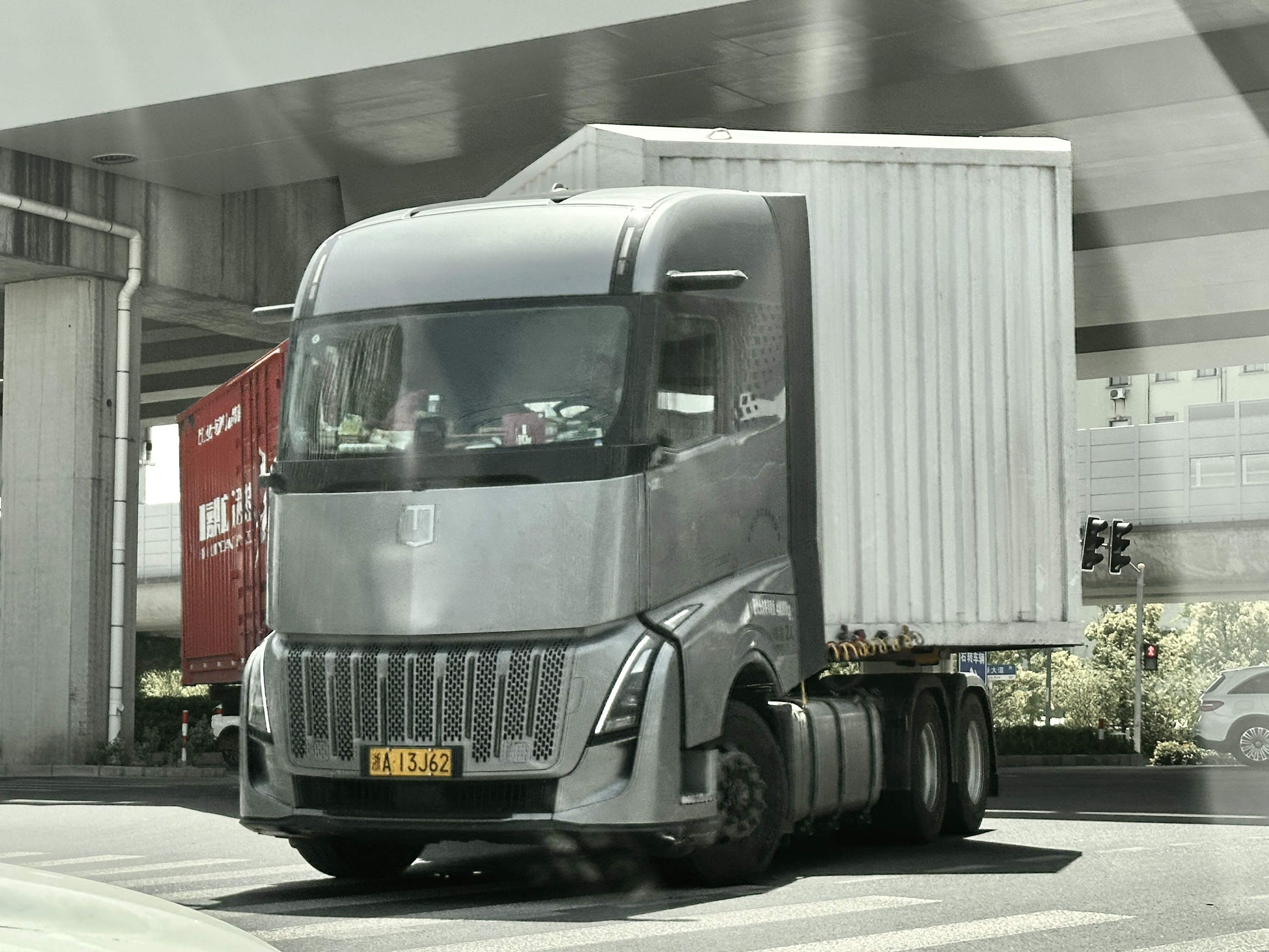
Farizon Xinghan H

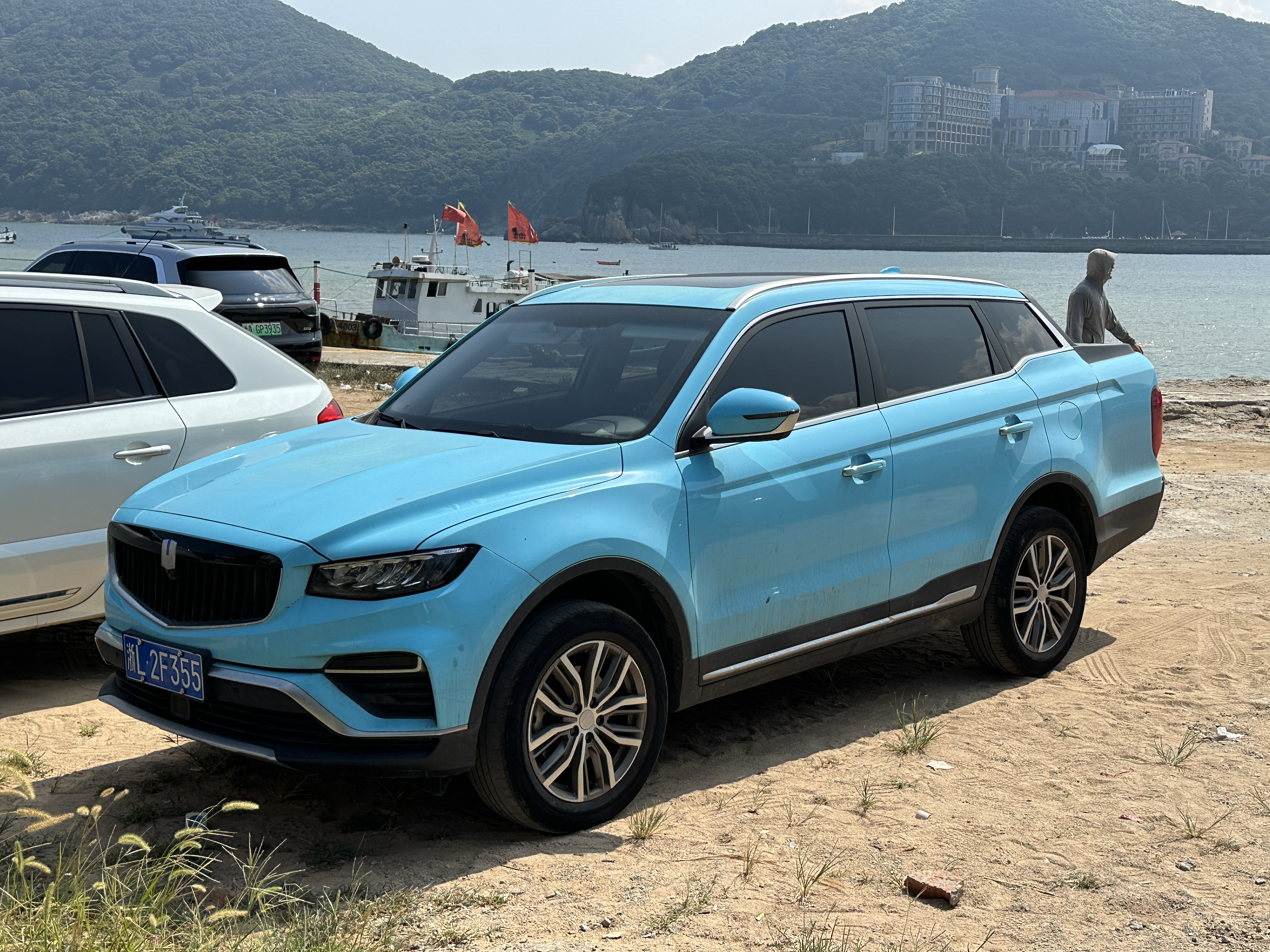
Farizon FX

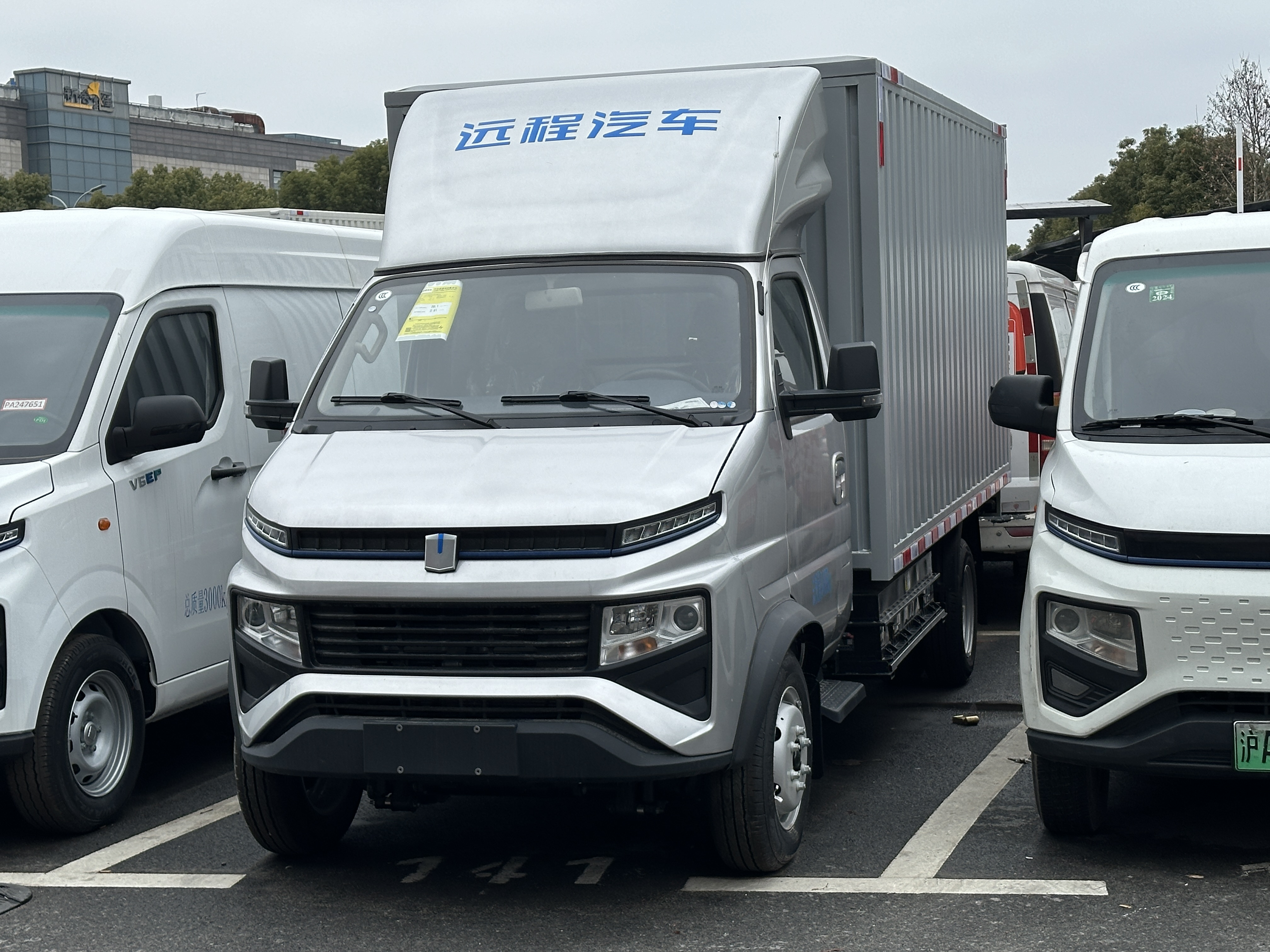
Farizon Fengrui F3E

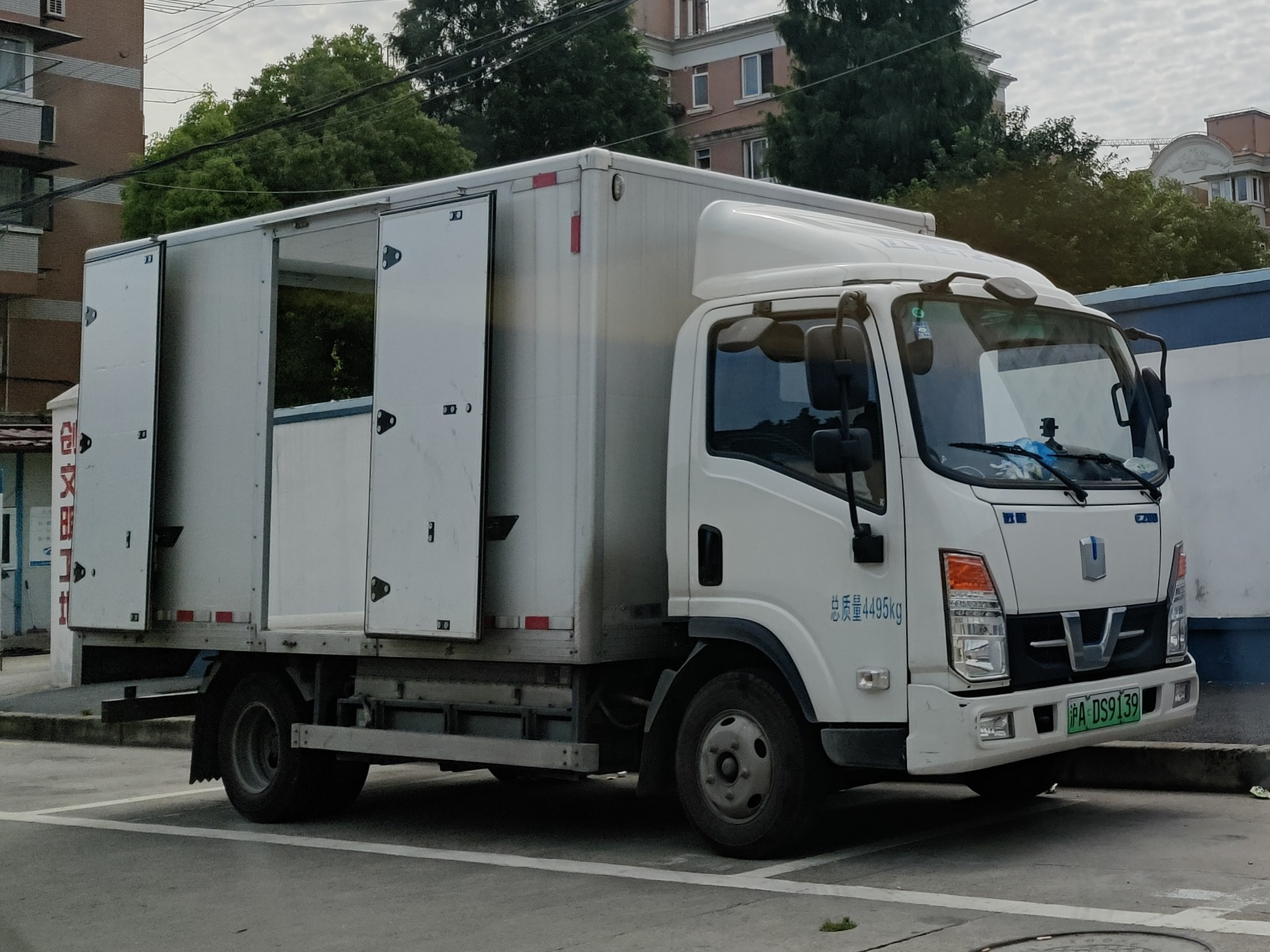
Farizon Fengrui E200

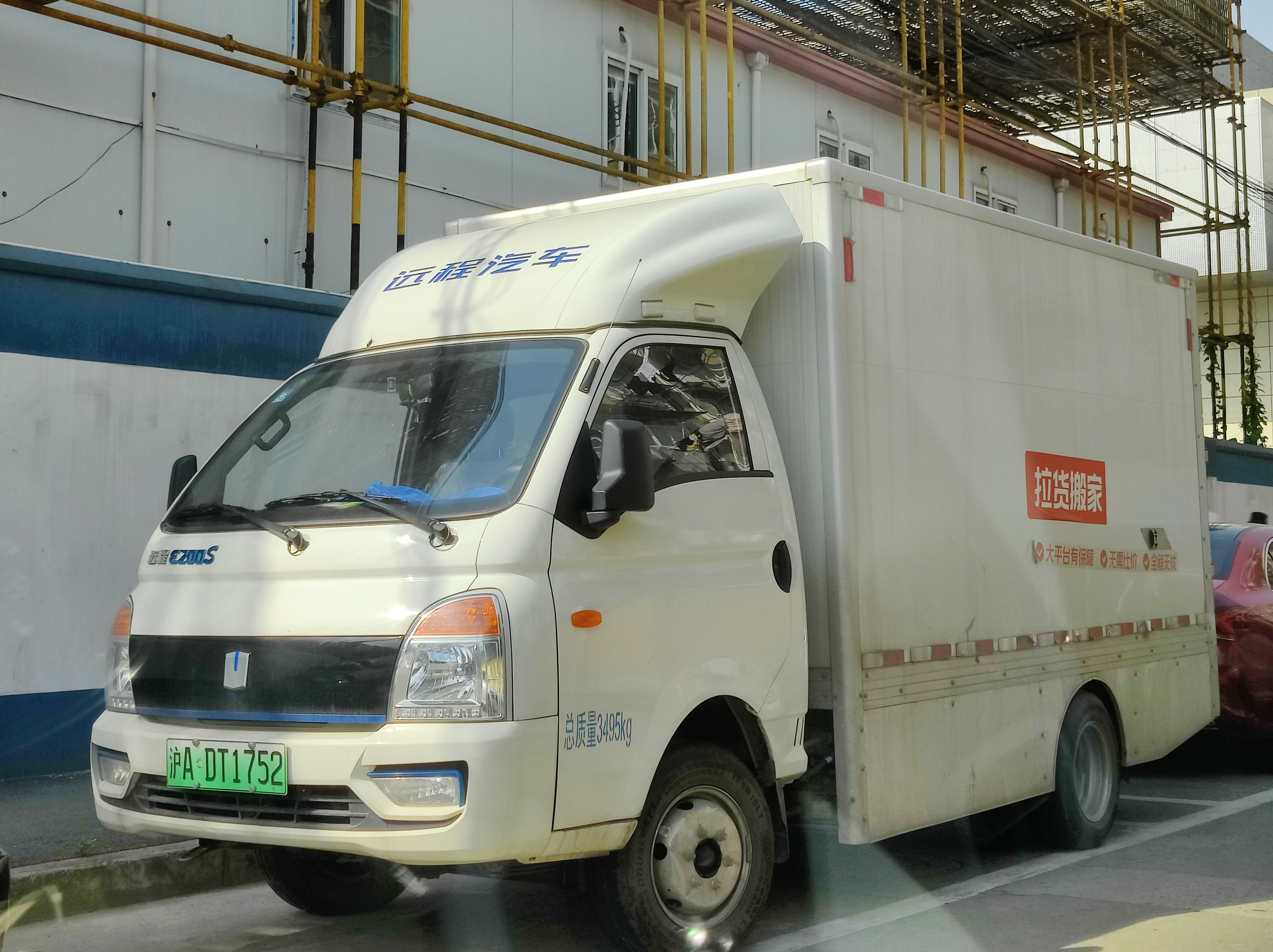
Farizon Fengrui E200S

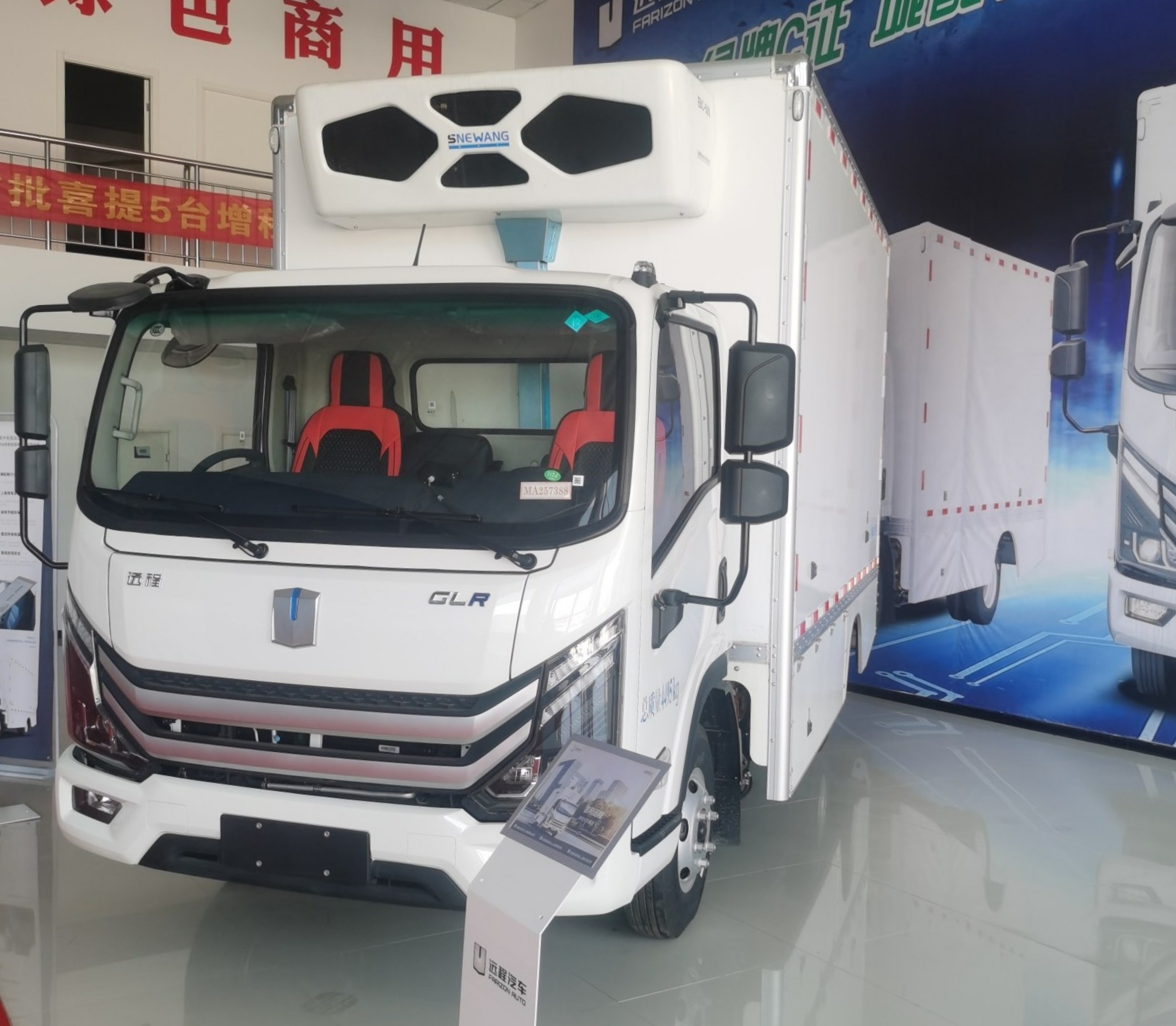
Farizon Fengrui E200X

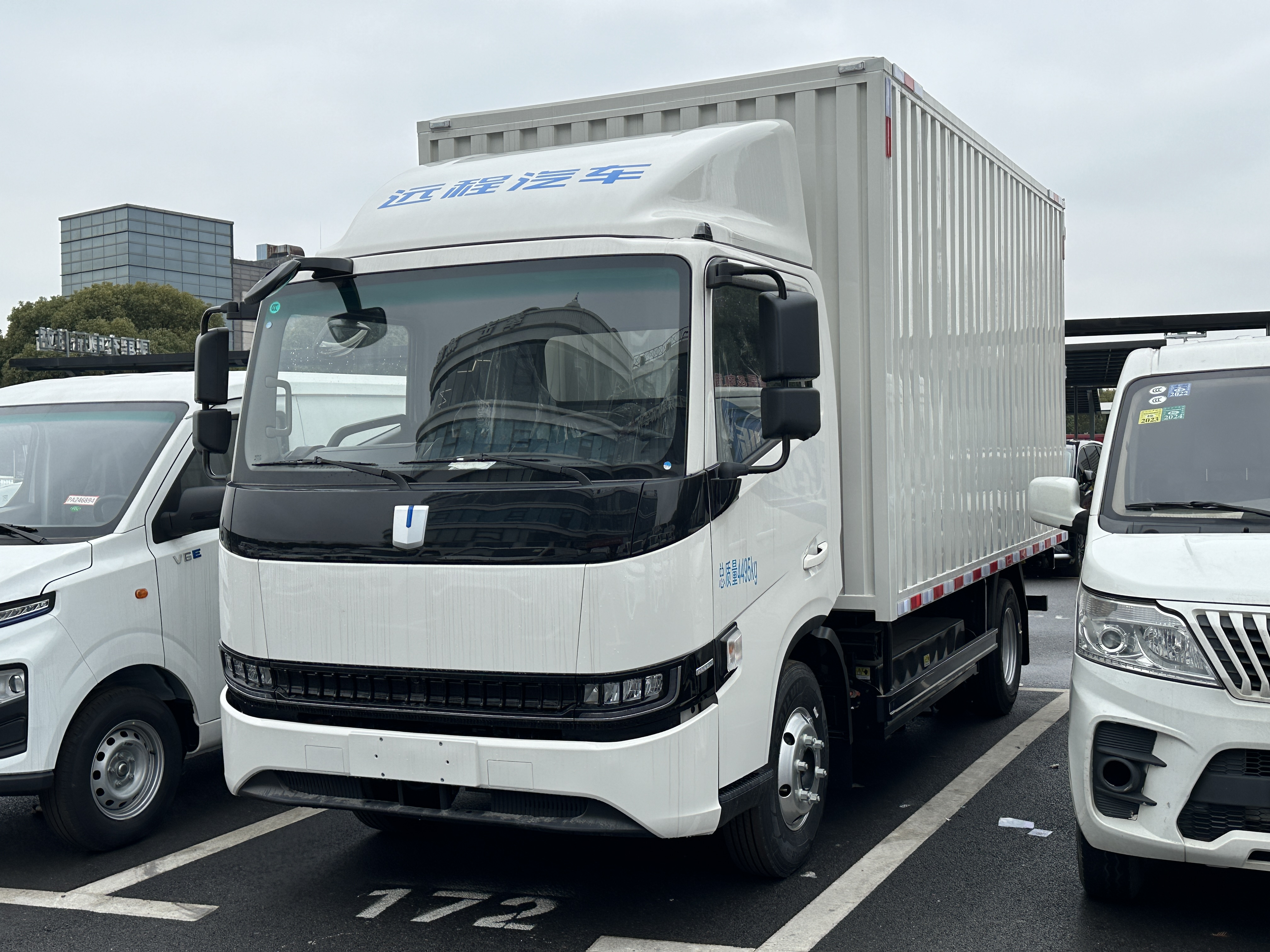
Farizon Xingzhi H8E

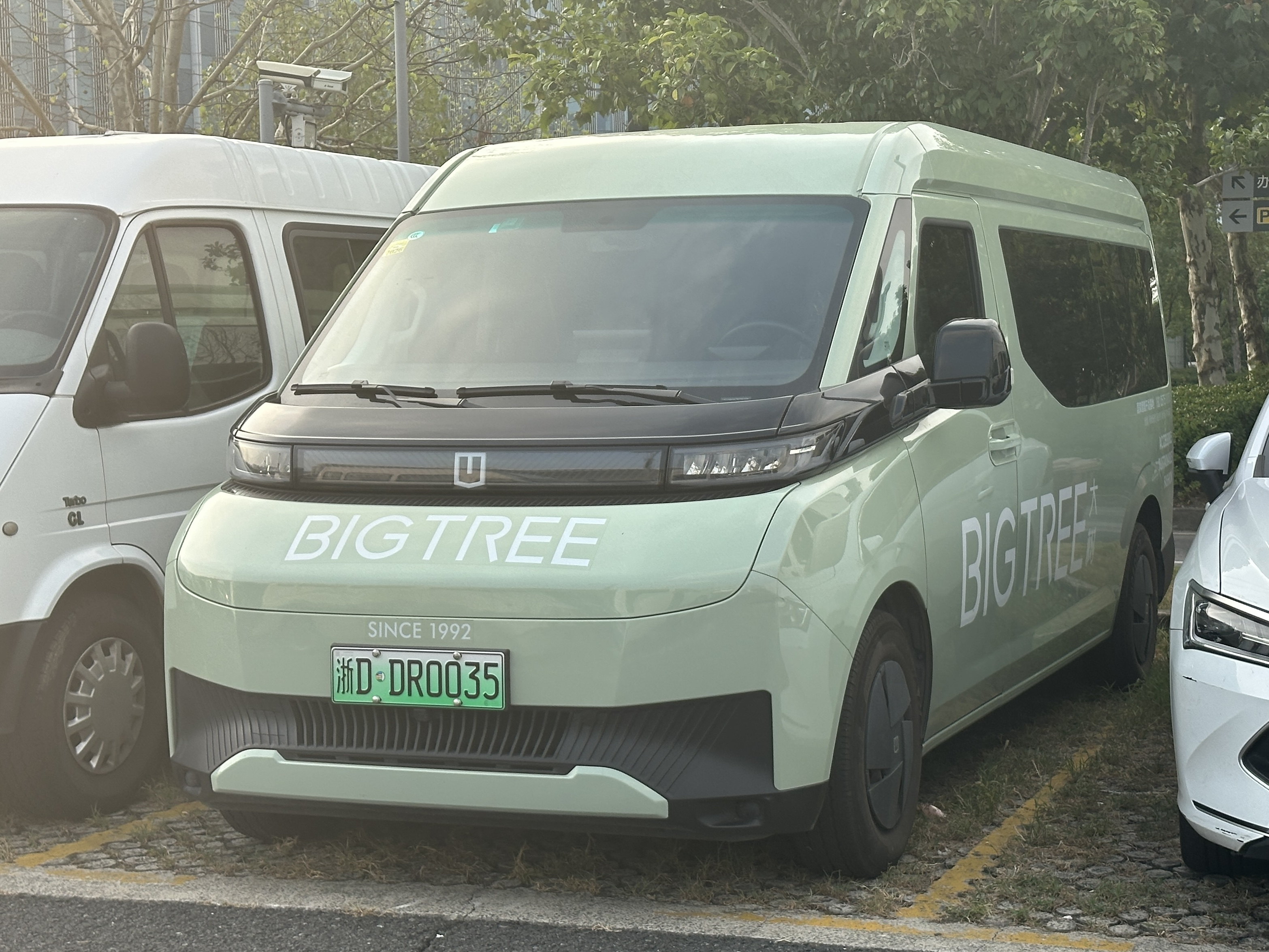
Farizon SV

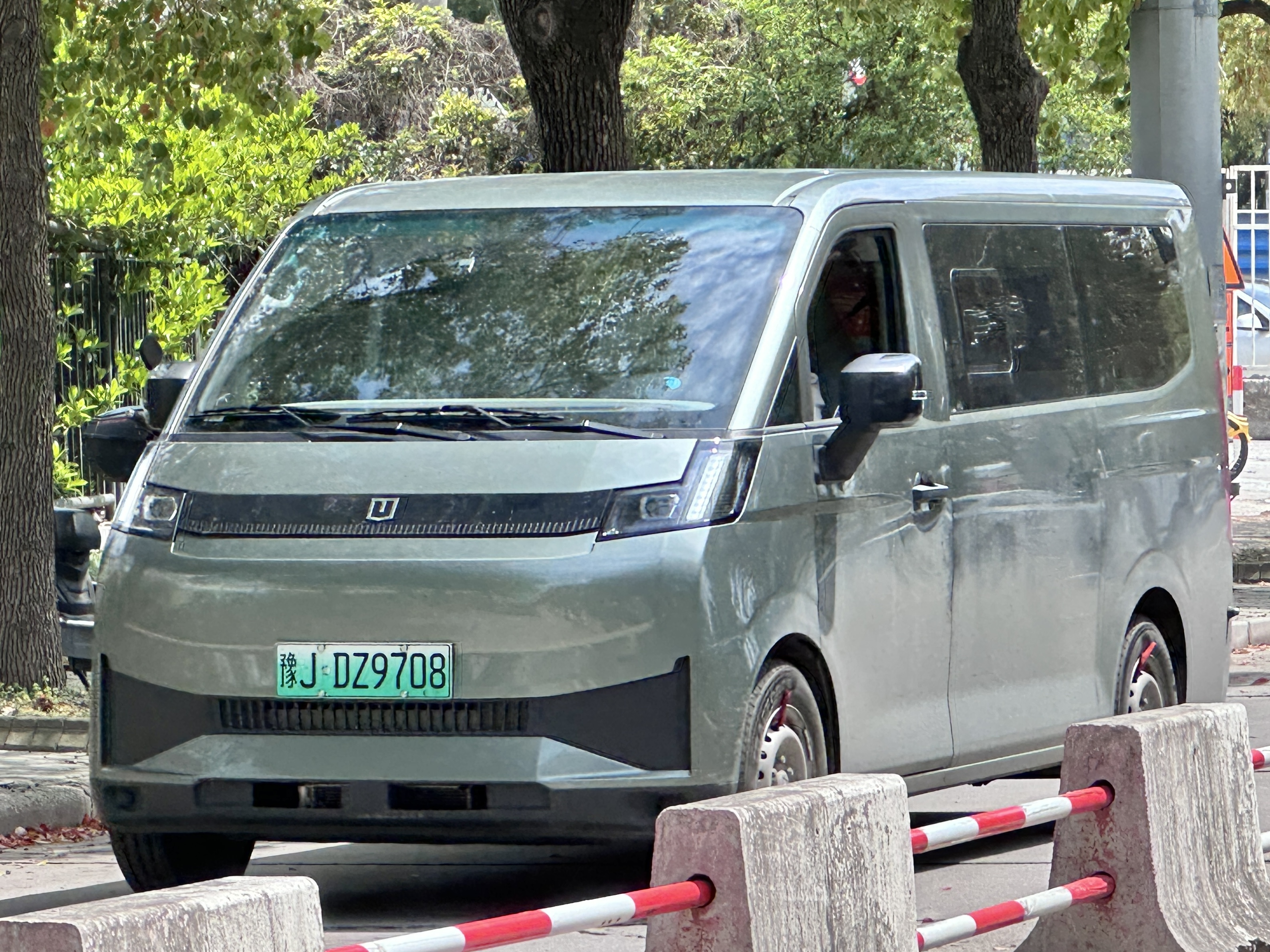
Farizon Xingxiang V7E II

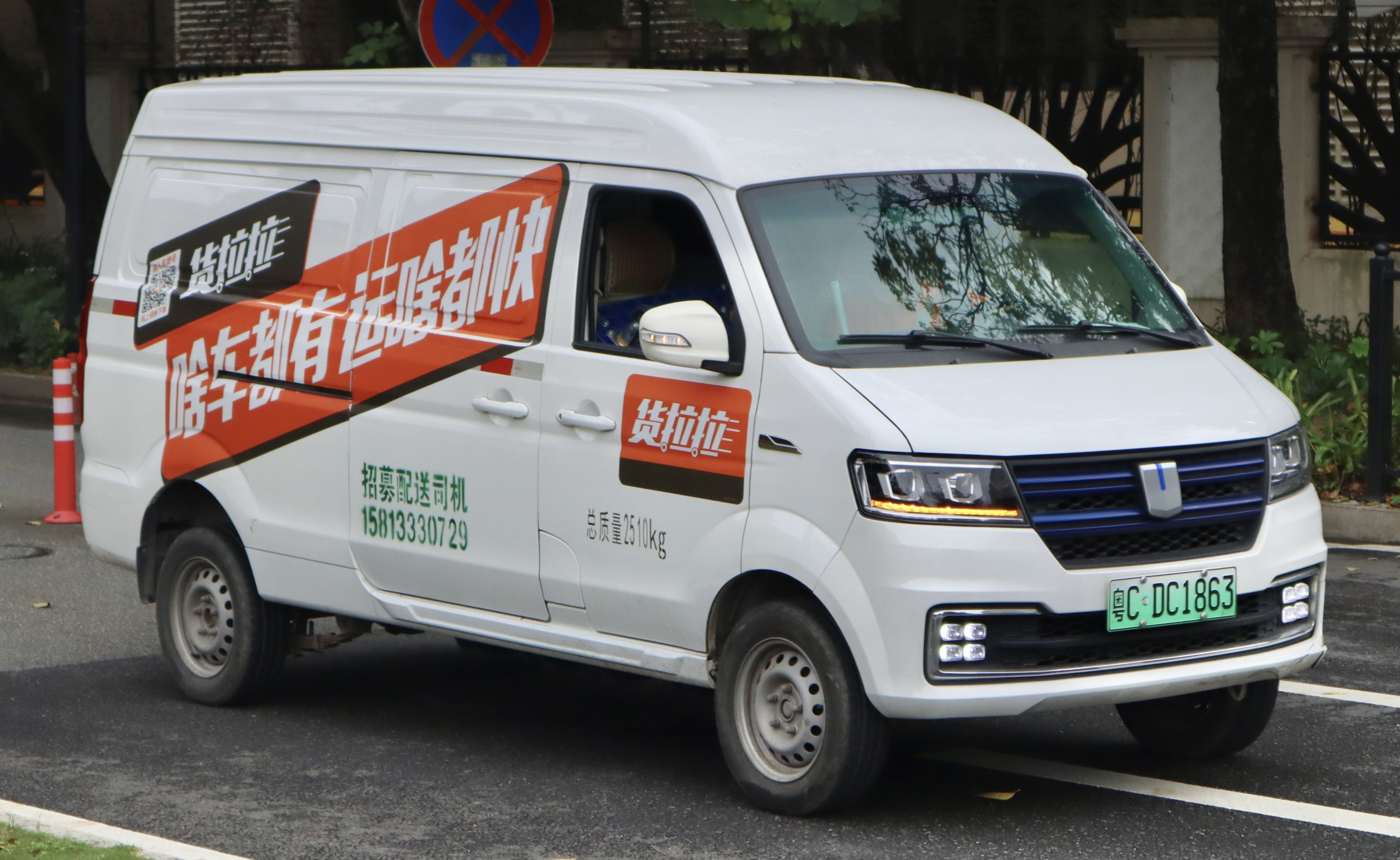
Farizon E5L

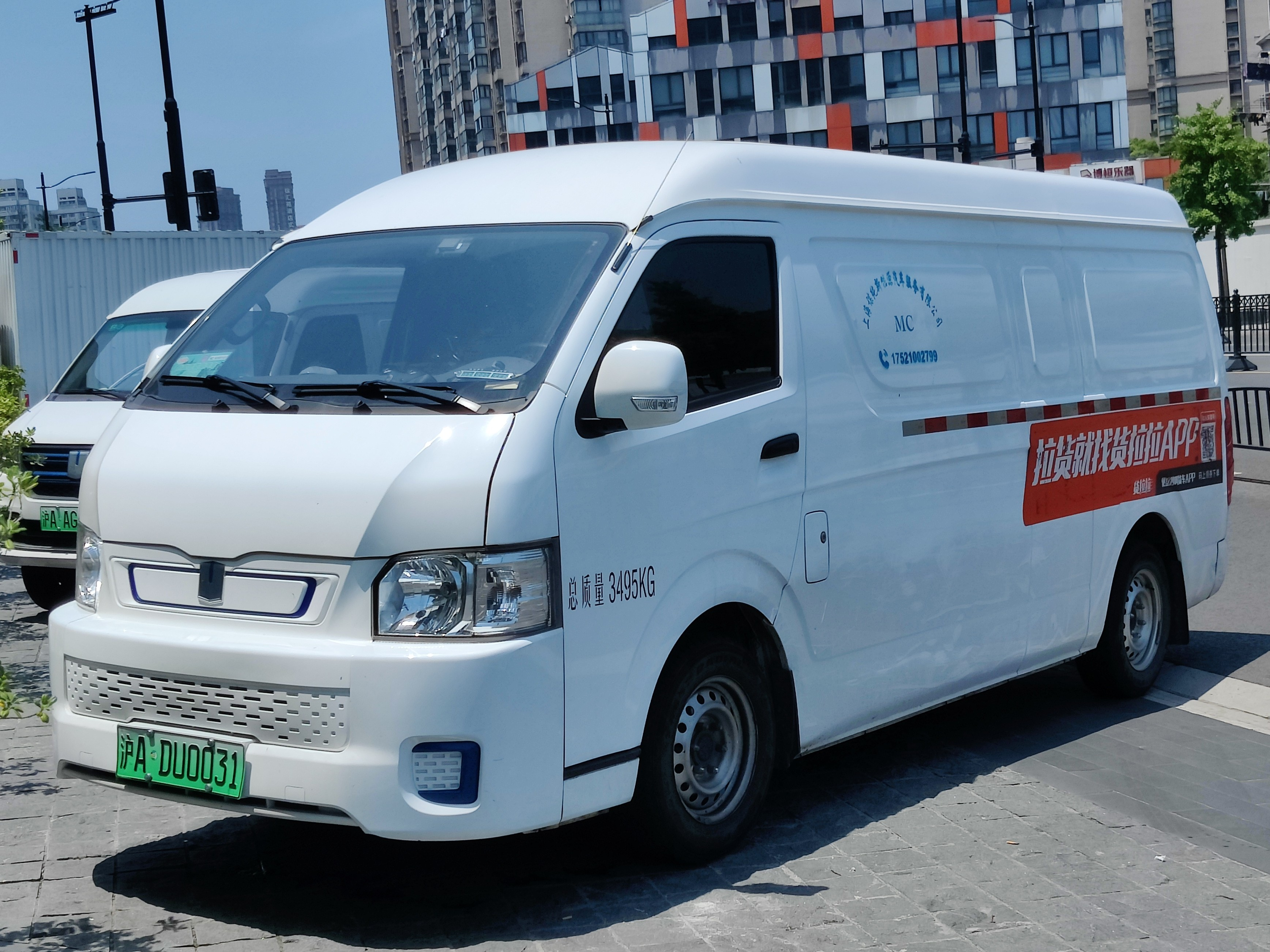
Farizon E6

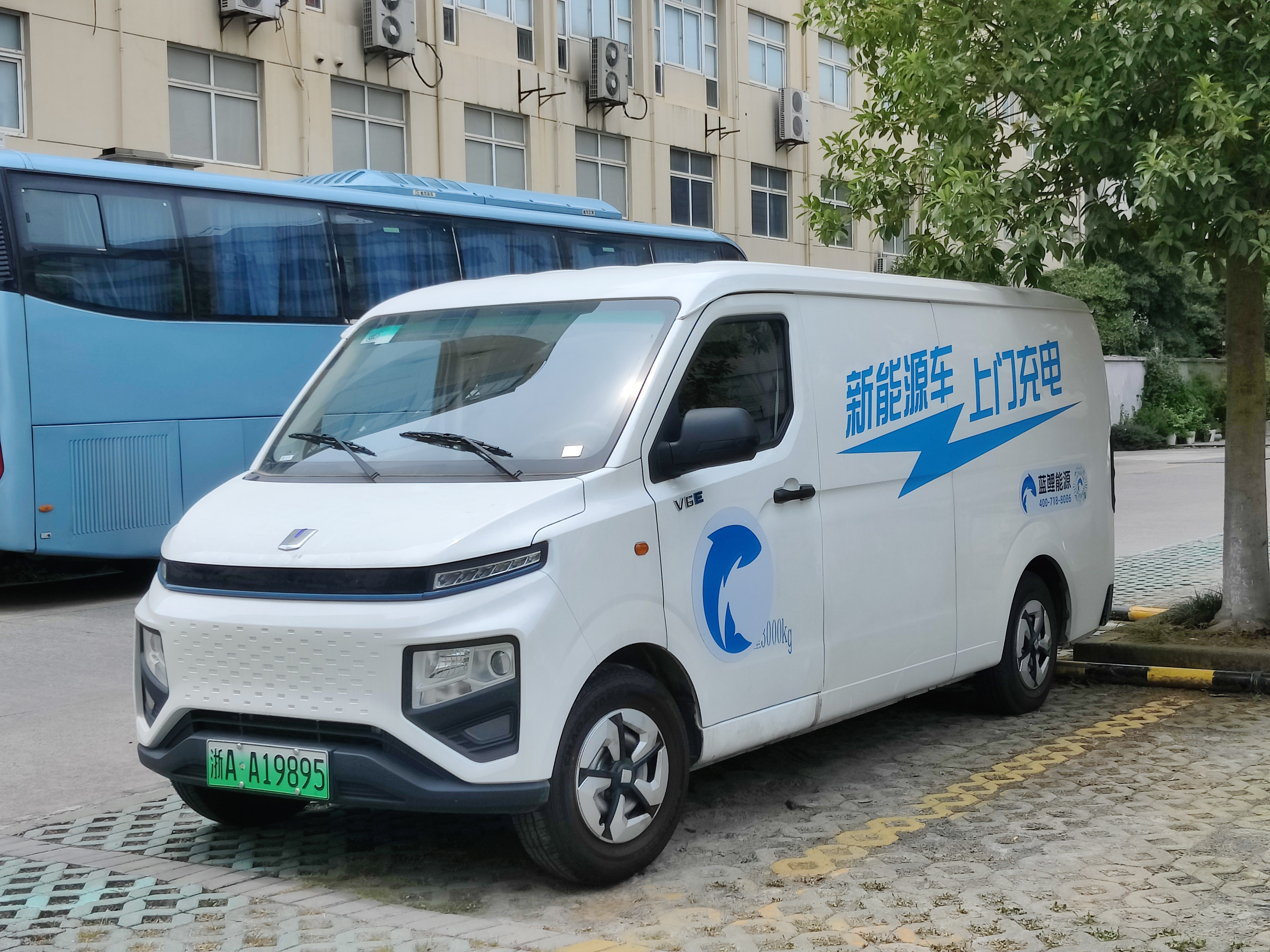
Farizon Xingxiang

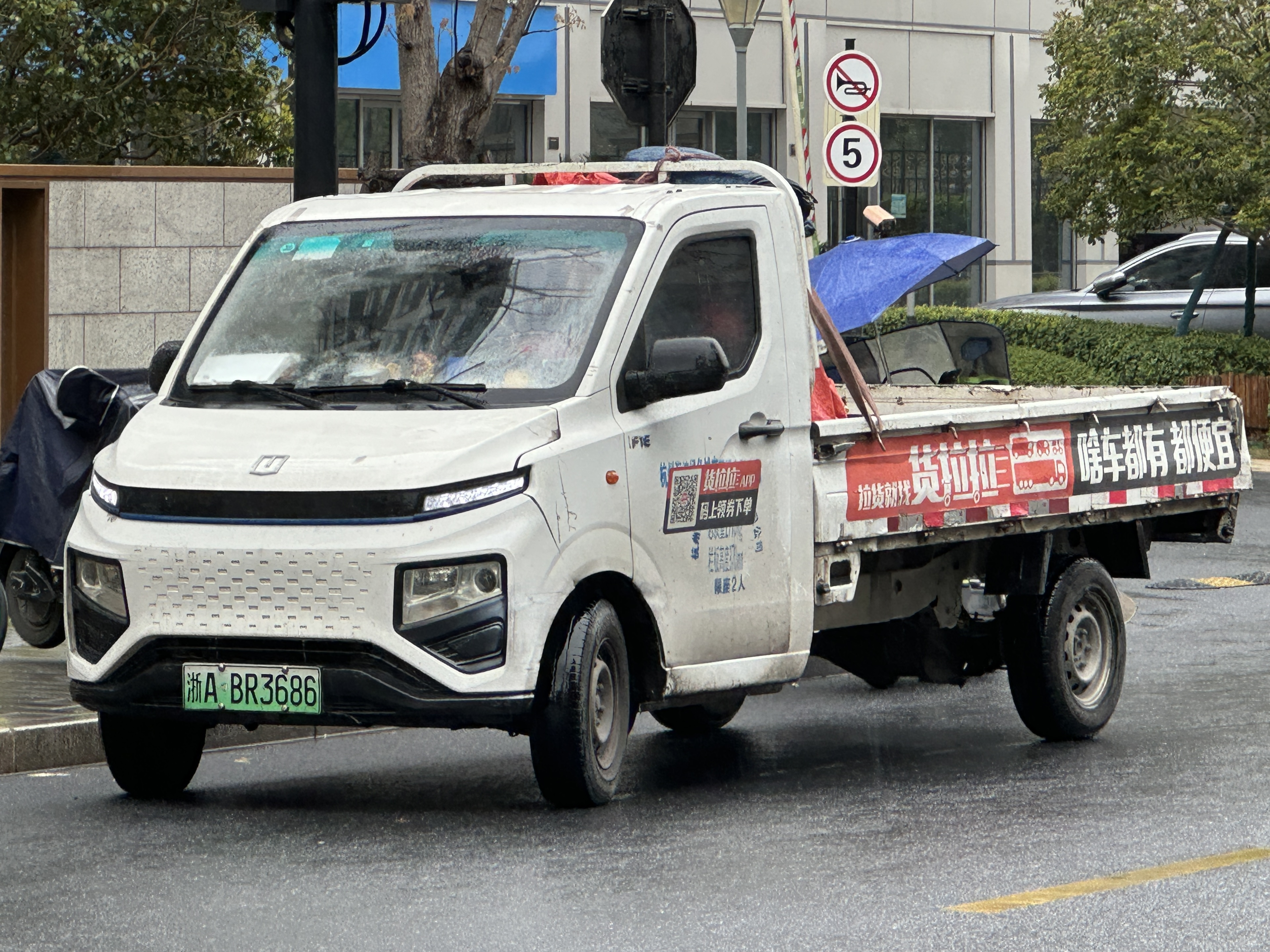
Farizon Xingxiang F1E

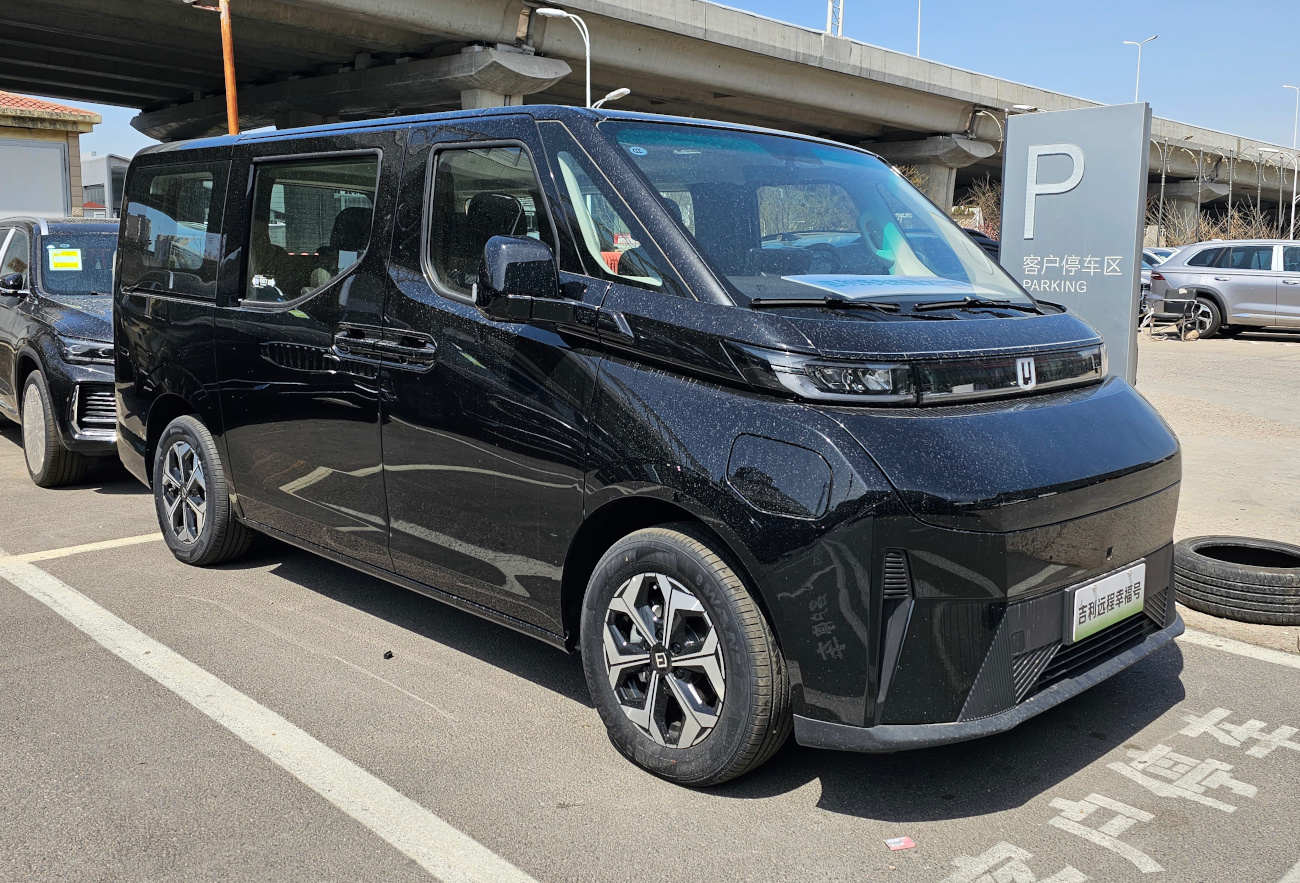
Farizon Xingfuhao

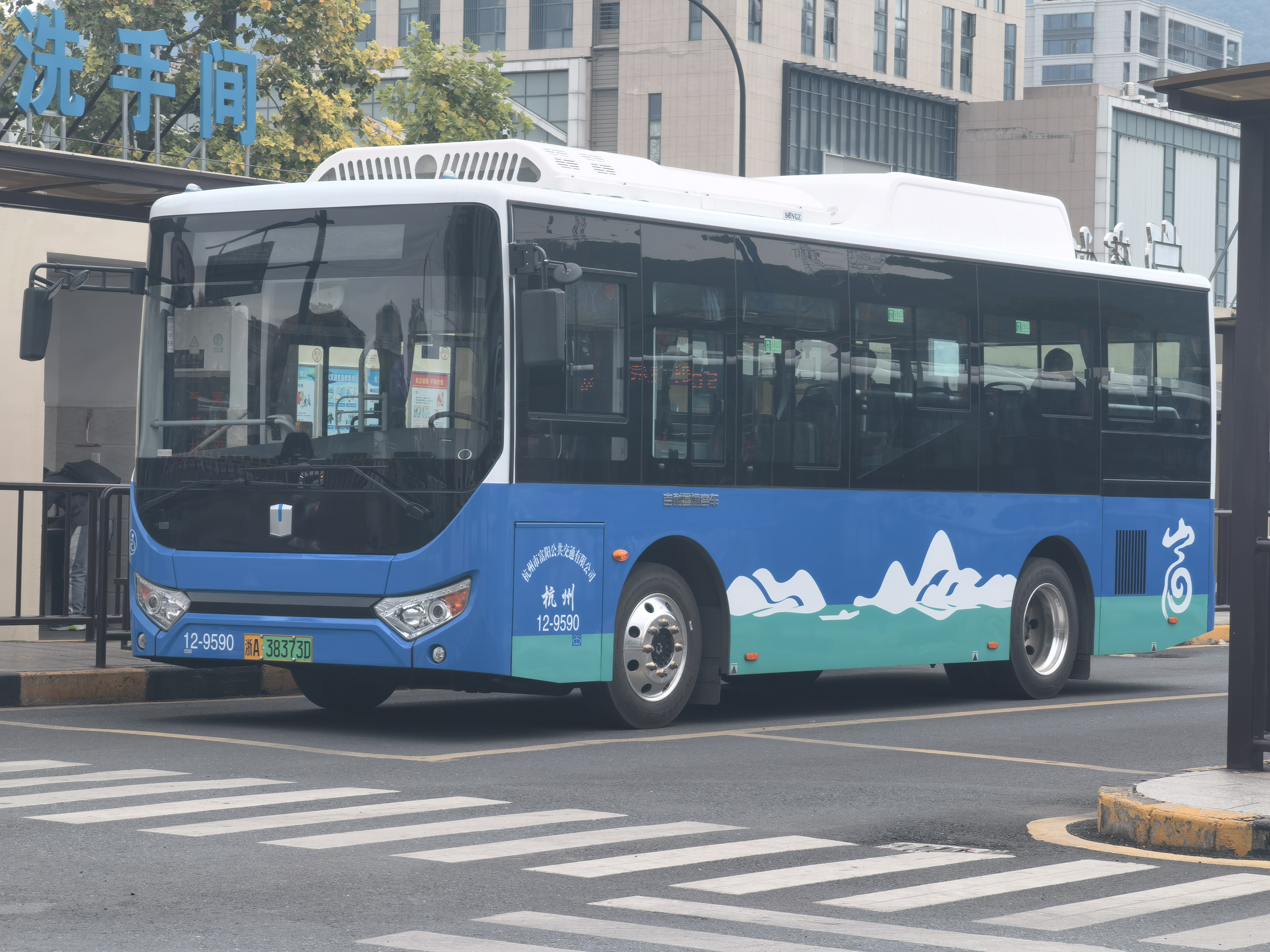
Farizon Xingji C8E

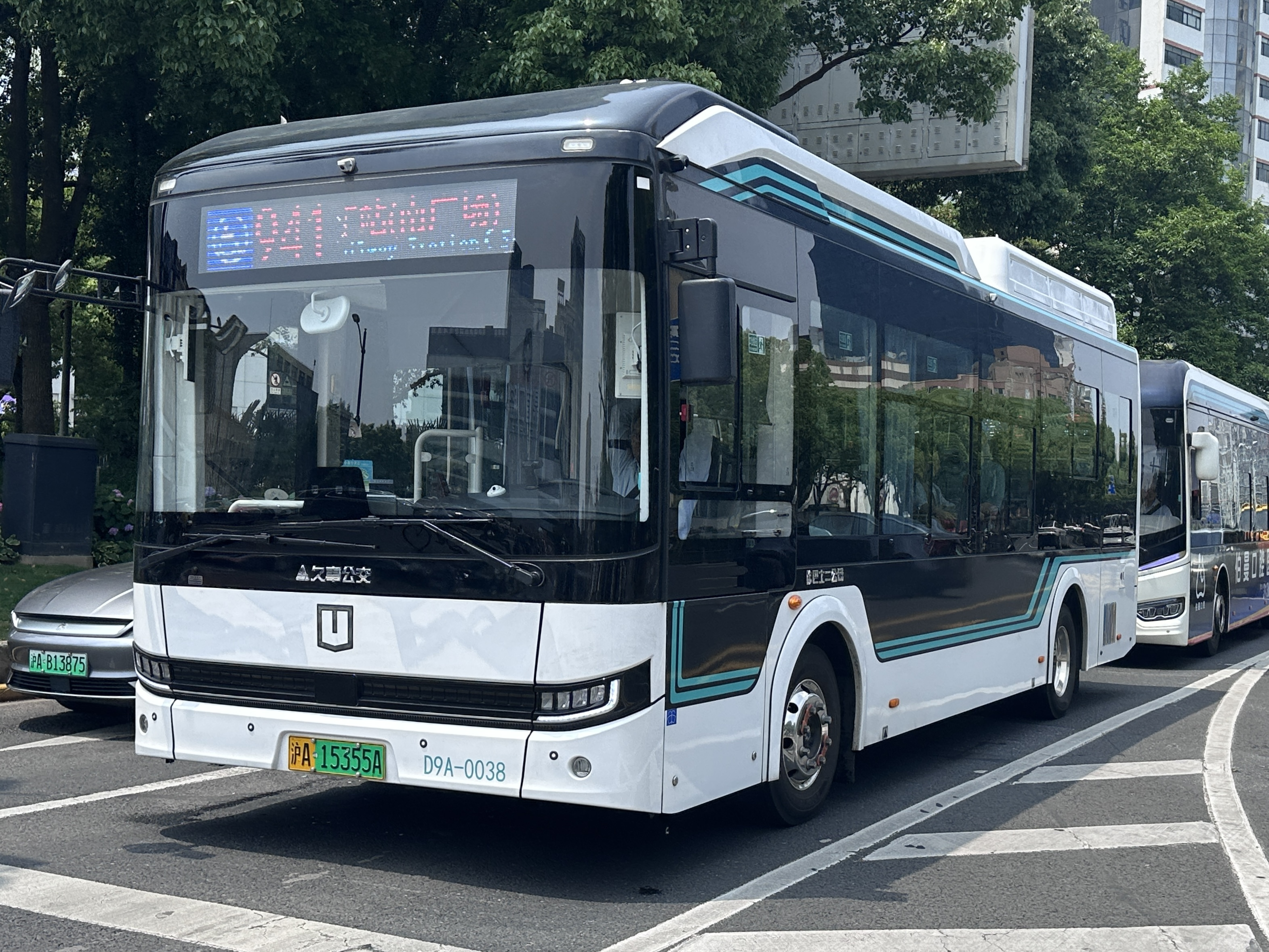
Farizon C9E

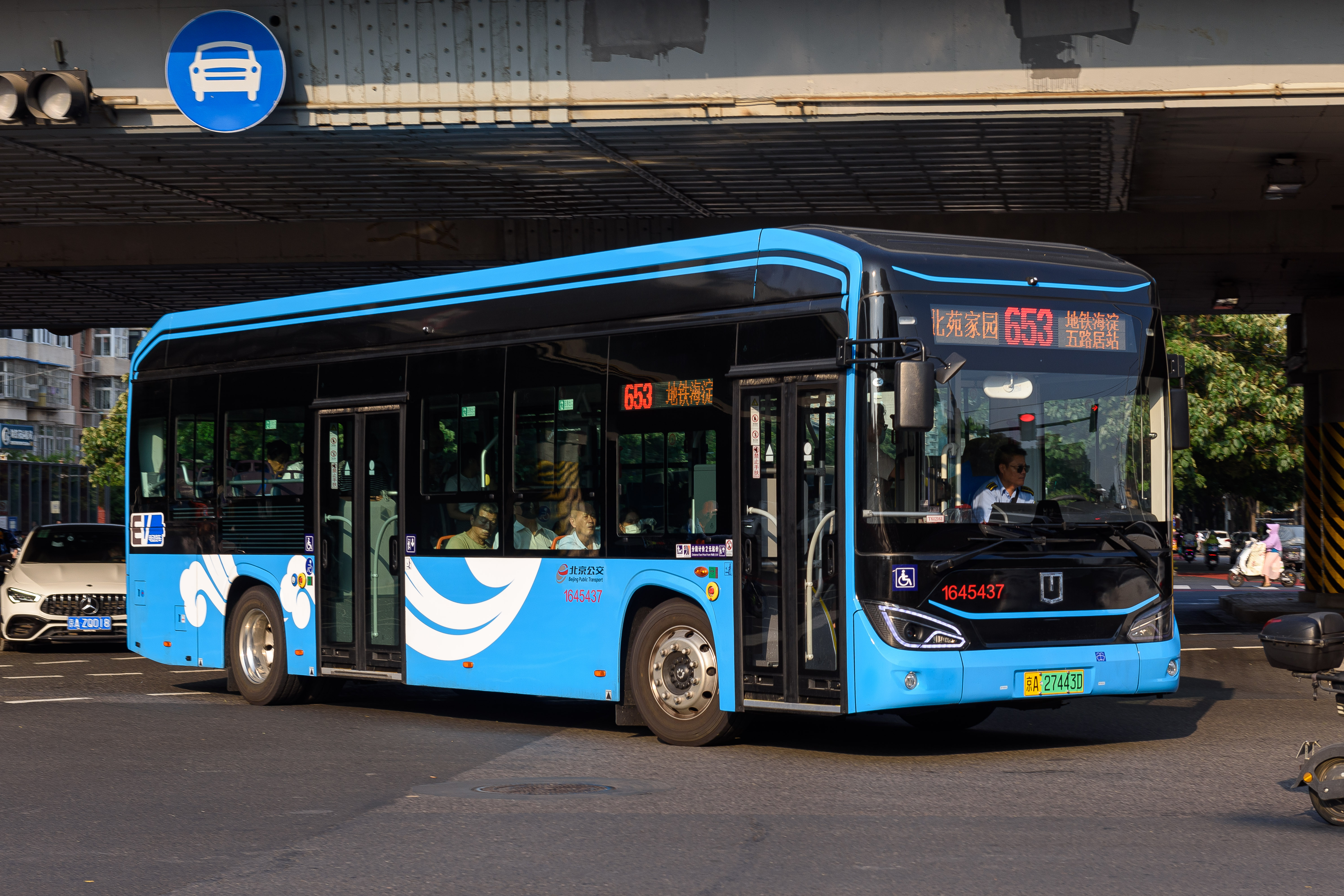
Farizon Xingji C10E

=== Ouling ===
Farizon acquired Ouling (Chinese: 欧铃) in 2021, a brand selling gasoline-powered lower end medium duty, light duty, and micro trucks.

- Ouling Fengrui F3 (欧铃 锋锐 F3) – single cab and crew cab micro truck
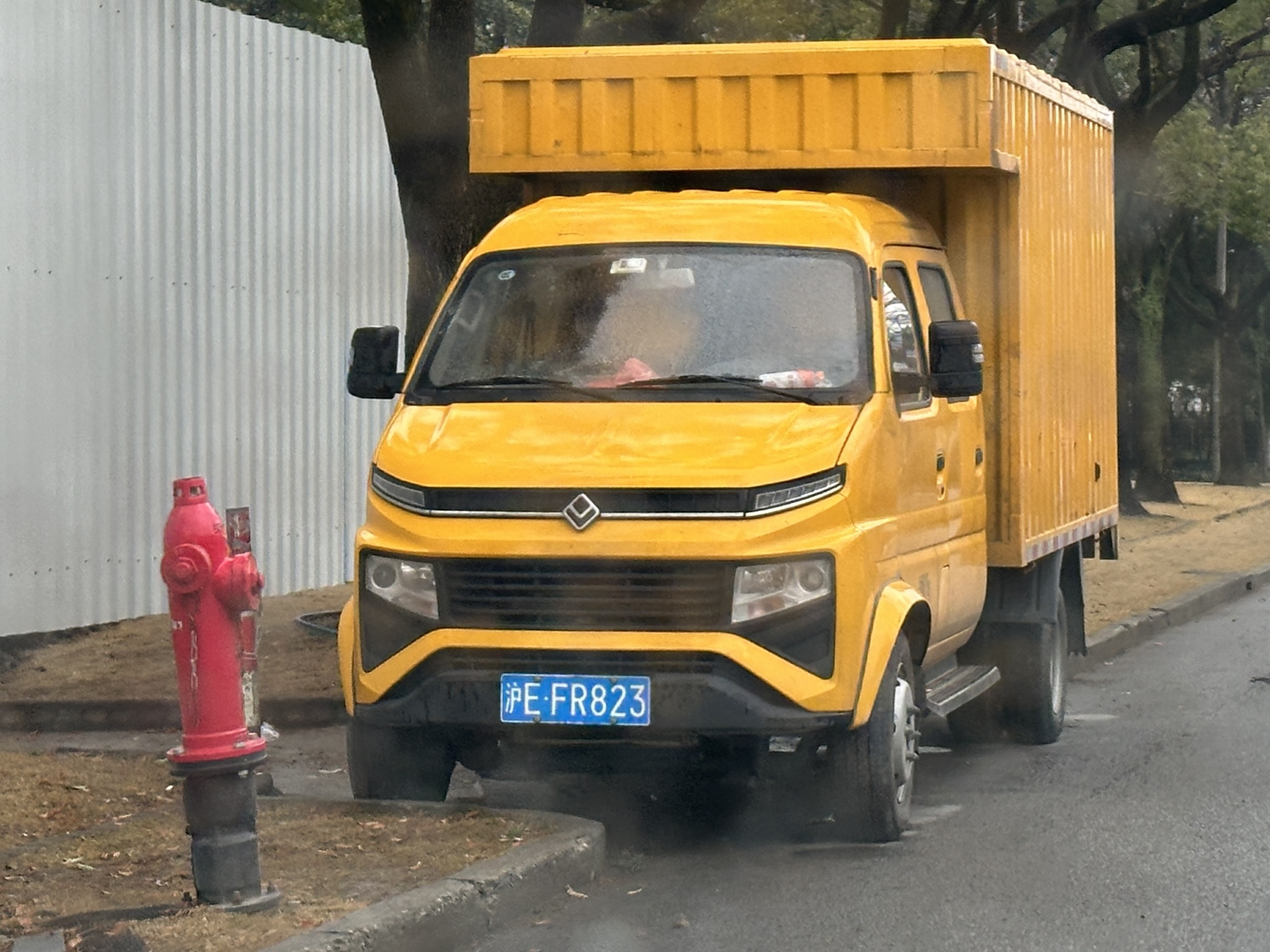
Ouling Fengrui F3

CAMC (Hanma Technology)

Farizon acquired CAMC (Chinese: 华菱星马) in 2020, a Chinese manufacturer of trucks and truck-based special vehicles established in 1999.

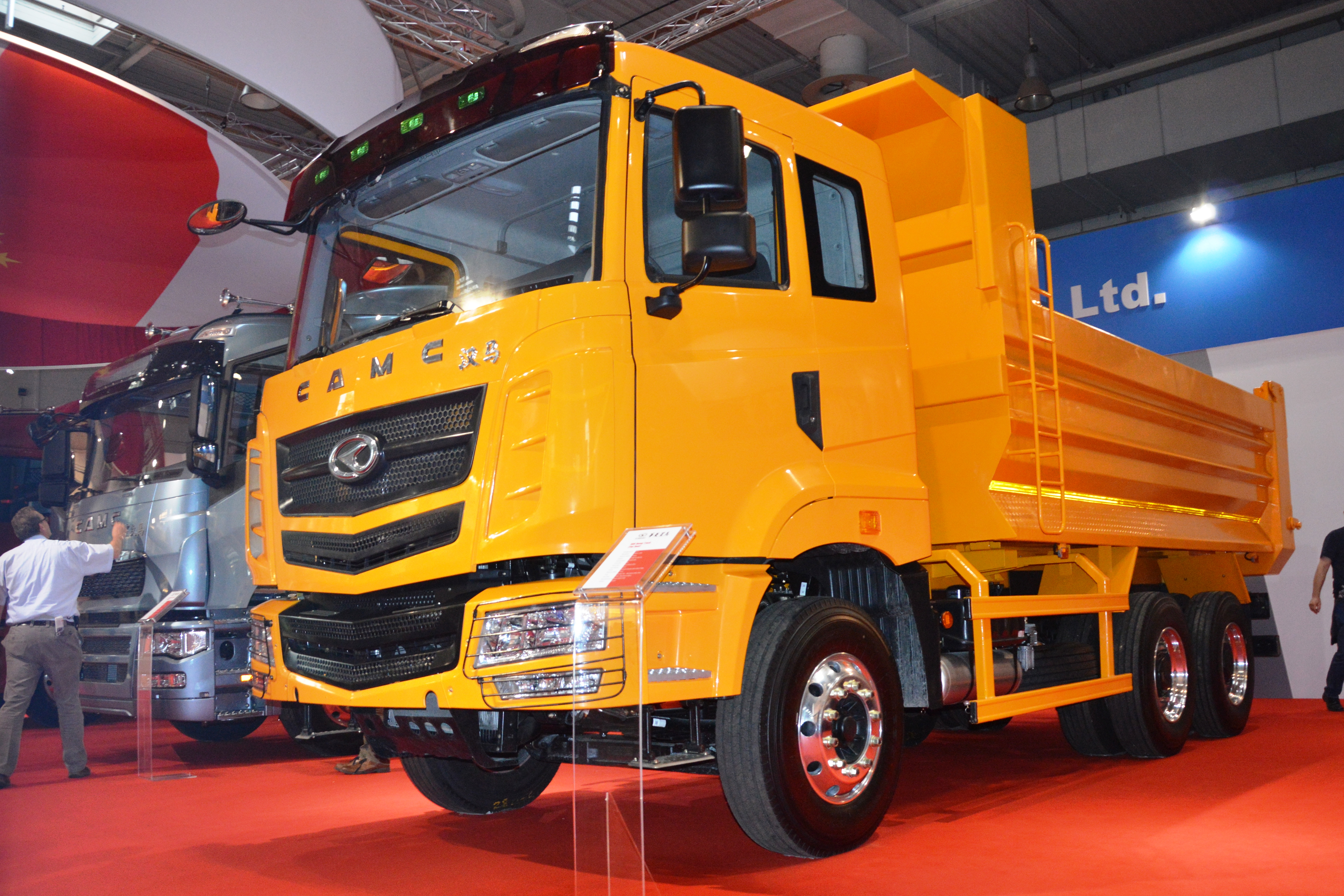
CAMC H08 dump truck
