= Bima (disambiguation) =

Bima is a city on the island of Sumbawa in Indonesia.

Bima may also refer to:

== Related to Bima, Indonesia ==
- Bima Sultanate, a former Muslim state in Indonesia
- Bima Regency, surrounding the city of Bima
- Sultan Muhammad Salahudin Airport, also known as Bima Airport
- Bima Bay
- Bimanese people
- Bima language

== Other places ==
- Bima, Nepal, a village in Nepal
- Bima Hill, a hill in Gombe State, Nigeria
- Bima River, in the Democratic Republic of the Congo

== Organisations ==
- Berkeley-Illinois-Maryland Association (BIMA), a collaboration that built the BIMA radio telescope array
- Institute for Federal Real Estate (Germany) (Bundesanstalt für Immobilienaufgaben, BImA), a German government agency
- British Interactive Media Association (BIMA), a not-for-profit industry body

== Transportation ==
- Bima (dredge), used for tin mining 1979–1990
- Bima (train), in Java, Indonesia
- Esemka Bima, a series of pickup trucks and vans

== Other uses ==
- Bima Bharti (born 1973), an Indian politician
- BIMA Satria Garuda, an Indonesian tokusatsu series
  - Satria Garuda BIMA-X
- Bema: Judaism; bema, in a Jewish context bima or bimah, is a raised platform in a synagogue
- Centro de Eventos Bima, a concert center in Bogotá, Colombia

== See also ==
- Bhim (disambiguation), including Bhima
- Bema (disambiguation)
