= Bhim (disambiguation) =

Bhim or Bhima is one of the central characters from the Hindu epic Mahabharata.

Bhim or Bhima may also refer to:

== People ==
- Bhima I, 11th century king of Gujarat in India
- Bhima II, 13th century king of Gujarat in India
- Bhima of Mahikavati, 13th century king of Konkan in India
- Bhim Chand (disambiguation), the name of several people
- Bhim Singh (disambiguation), the name of several people

== Places ==
- Bhim, Rajsamand district, Rajasthan, India
  - Bhim Assembly constituency
- Bhima River, in India

== Other uses ==
- BHIM, an Indian mobile payment app
- Bhim self-propelled howitzer, a type of self-propelled artillery
- Bhim-class tugboat, in the Indian Navy
- Bhima (moth), a genus of moths in the family Lasiocampidae
- Bhima Jewellers, Indian jewellery retail company

== See also ==
- Bima (disambiguation)
- Bhimsen (disambiguation)
- Bhimadeva (disambiguation)
- Bhim Singh (disambiguation)
- Bheemaa, a 2008 Indian film
- Bheema (2024 film), an Indian action thriller film
- B. R. Ambedkar (Bhimrao Ramji Ambedkar, 1891–1956), Indian political leader
- Komaram Bheem (1900–1940), Indian independence activist
- Chhota Bheem (2008–present), Indian animated series
