= X30 =

X30 may refer to:

== Automobiles ==
- Jinbei Haixing X30, a minivan
- Toyota Chaser (X30), a sedan
- Toyota Mark II (X30), a mid-size car

== Consumer electronics ==
- Dell Axim x30, a PDA
- Fujifilm X30, a camera
- Motorola Edge X30, a smartphone
- ThinkPad X30, a notebook computer

== Other uses ==
- X30 (New York City bus)
- Rockwell X-30, an American spacecraft project
- X30, a bus service operated by Essex Airlink
