= Bhimsen =

Bhimsen may refer to:

- Bhimasena, known as Bhima
- Bhimsen, Kanpur, a town in Uttar Pradesh, India
- Bhimsen Joshi (1922–2011), Indian vocalist
- Bhimsen (raga) A raga created by Mahesh Mahadev
- Bhimsen Thapa, the longest ruling Mukhtiyar (equivalent to Prime Minister) of Nepal
- Bhimsen Tower, former heritage tower in Kathmandu by Bhimsen Thapa

== See also ==
- Bhima (disambiguation)
