= SRM Shineray E3 =

Battery electric van

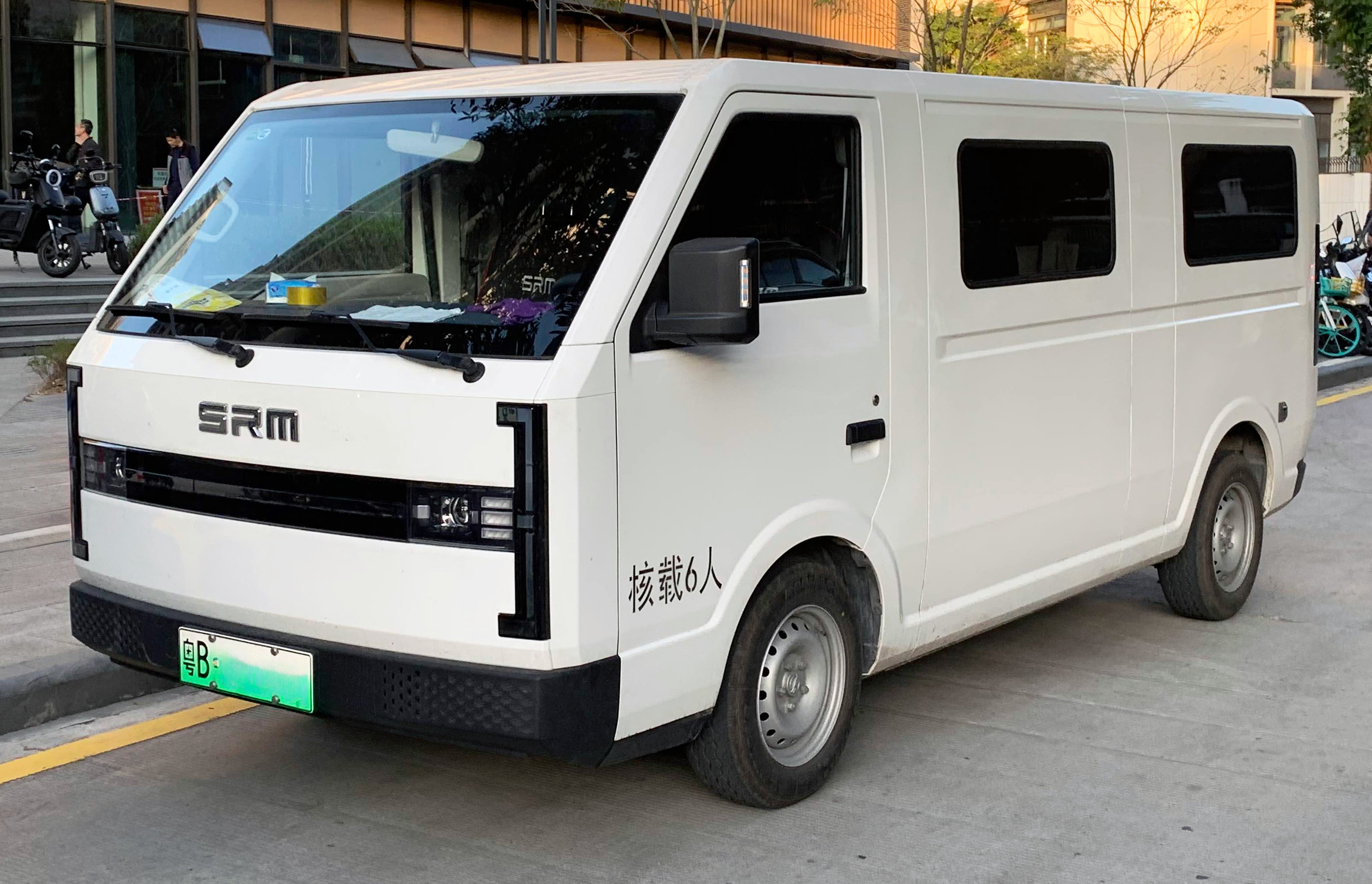

Overview
- Manufacturer: Shineray Group
- Production: 2024–present
- Assembly: China

Body and chassis
- Class: Light commercial vehicle
- Body style: 4-door van
- Layout: Mid-engine, rear-wheel-drive

Powertrain
- Electric motor: 60 kW permanent magnet synchronous
- Power output: 80 hp (60 kW; 81 PS)
- Transmission: Single-speed gear reduction
- Battery: 32.14 kWh LFP CATL; 38.64 kWh LFP CATL; 41.86 kWh LFP CATL
- Electric range: 221–263 km (137–163 mi) (CLTC)

Dimensions
- Wheelbase: 2,520 mm (99.2 in); 2,865 mm (112.8 in) (E3L)
- Length: 4,555 mm (179.3 in); 4,900 mm (192.9 in) (E3L)
- Width: 1,780 mm (70.1 in)
- Height: 1,990 mm (78.3 in)
- Curb weight: 800–1,000 kg (1,764–2,205 lb)

The SRM Shineray E3 (Chinese: 鑫源E3) and the slightly longer E3L variant is a battery electric van produced by Chinese car manufacturer Shineray Group under the SRM Shineray marque, and was launched in May 2024.

== Overview ==
The SRM Shineray E3 and E3L share the same boxy design. Both variants share a single powertrain across the range with a rear positioned 60 kW (80 hp; 82 PS) electric motor and 220 N⋅m (162 lb⋅ft). The E3 is powered by a 32.14 kWh CATL-supplied battery supporting 221 km (137 mi) of range or a 38.64 kWh CATL-supplied battery supporting 253 km (157 mi) of range. The E3L is powered by a 41.86 kWh CATL-supplied battery supporting 263 km (163 mi) of range. The E3 features a 1.275 m^{2} (13.72 sq ft) side entrance with the sliding doors open and a 3,145 mm (123.8 in) cargo area depth.

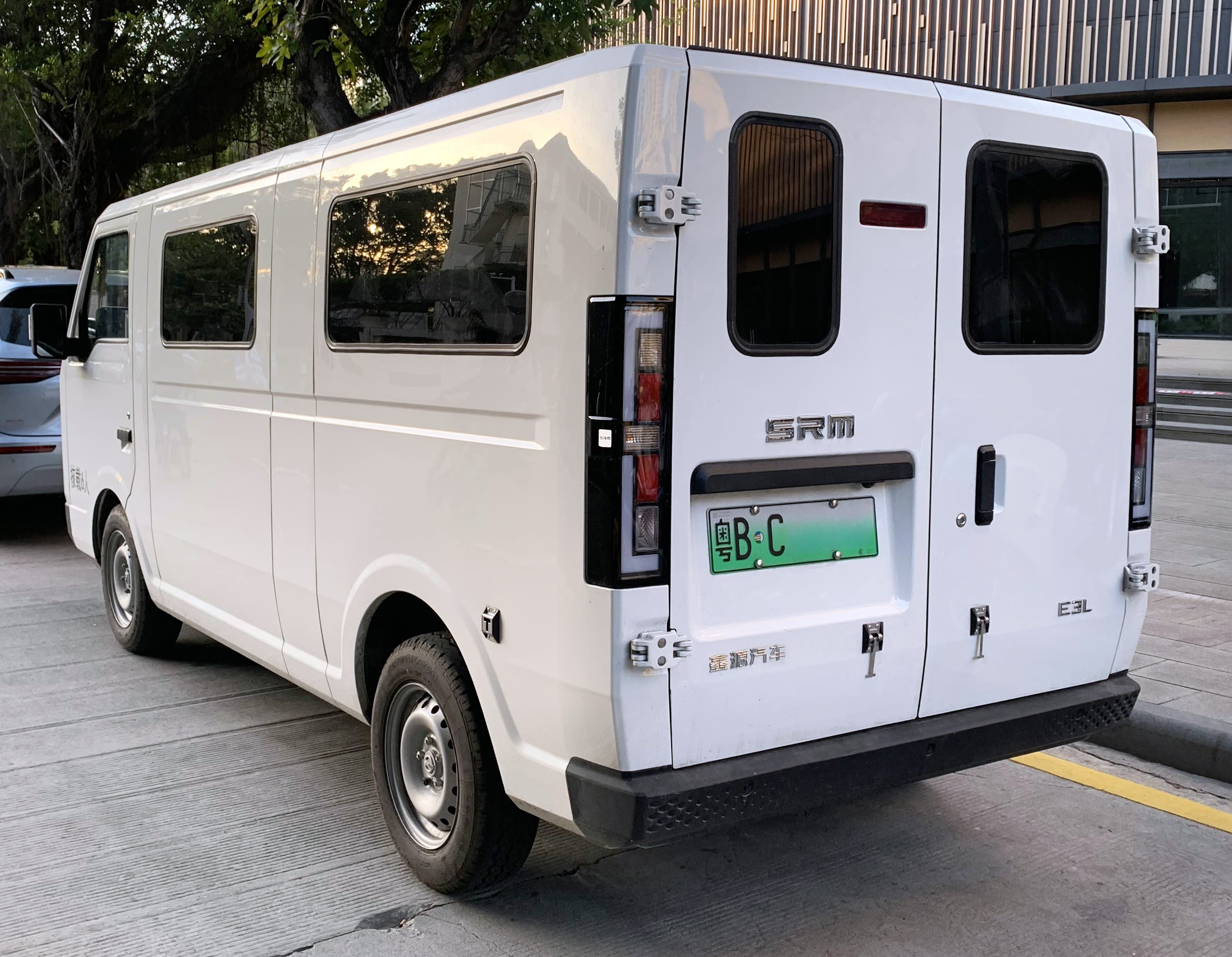
Rear view

=== 2026 (facelift) ===
The E3 and E3L both received a facelift for the 2026 model year, giving the original radically boxy front end a more generic restyle.

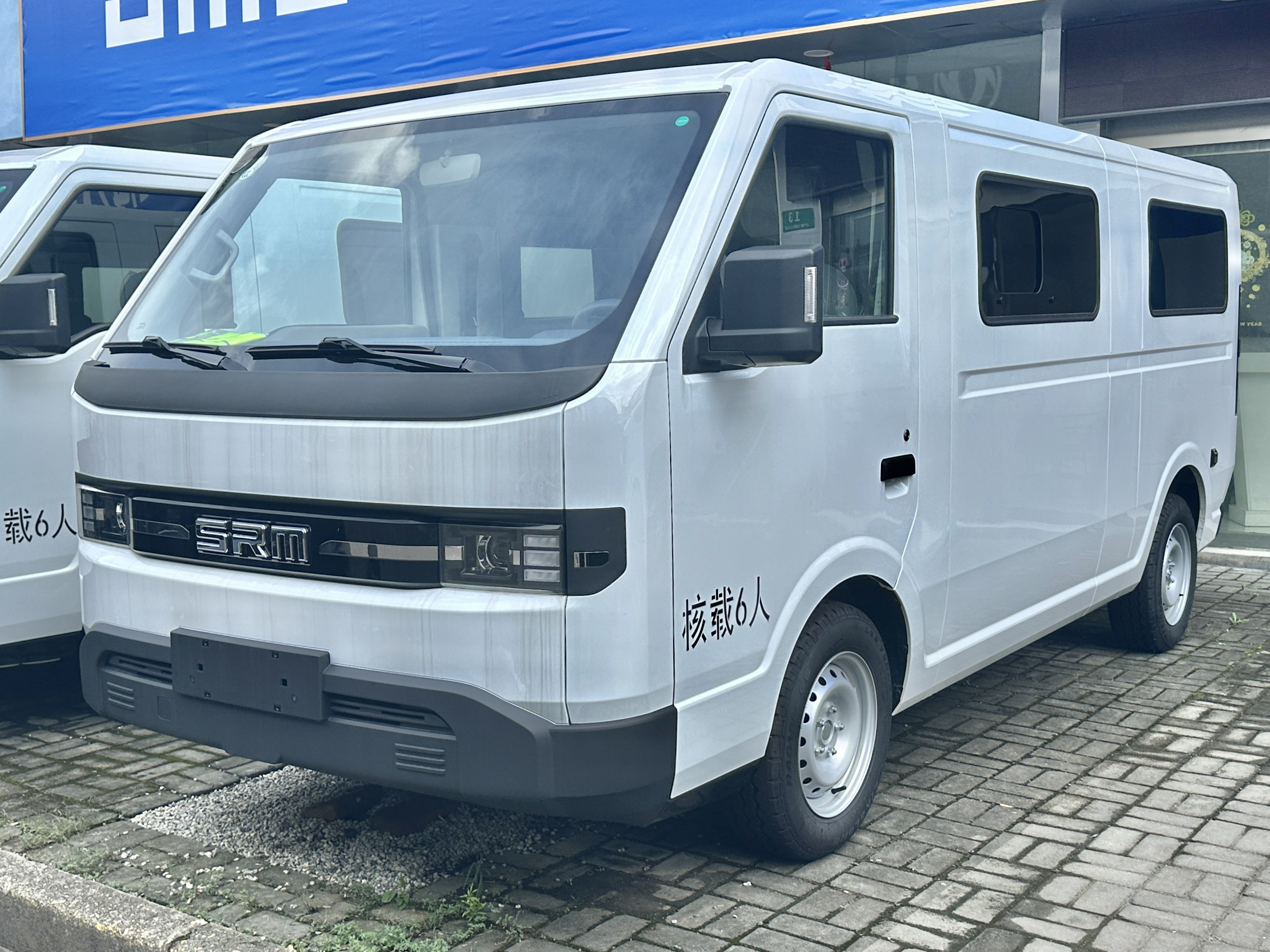
SRM Shineray E3L 2026 (facelift)

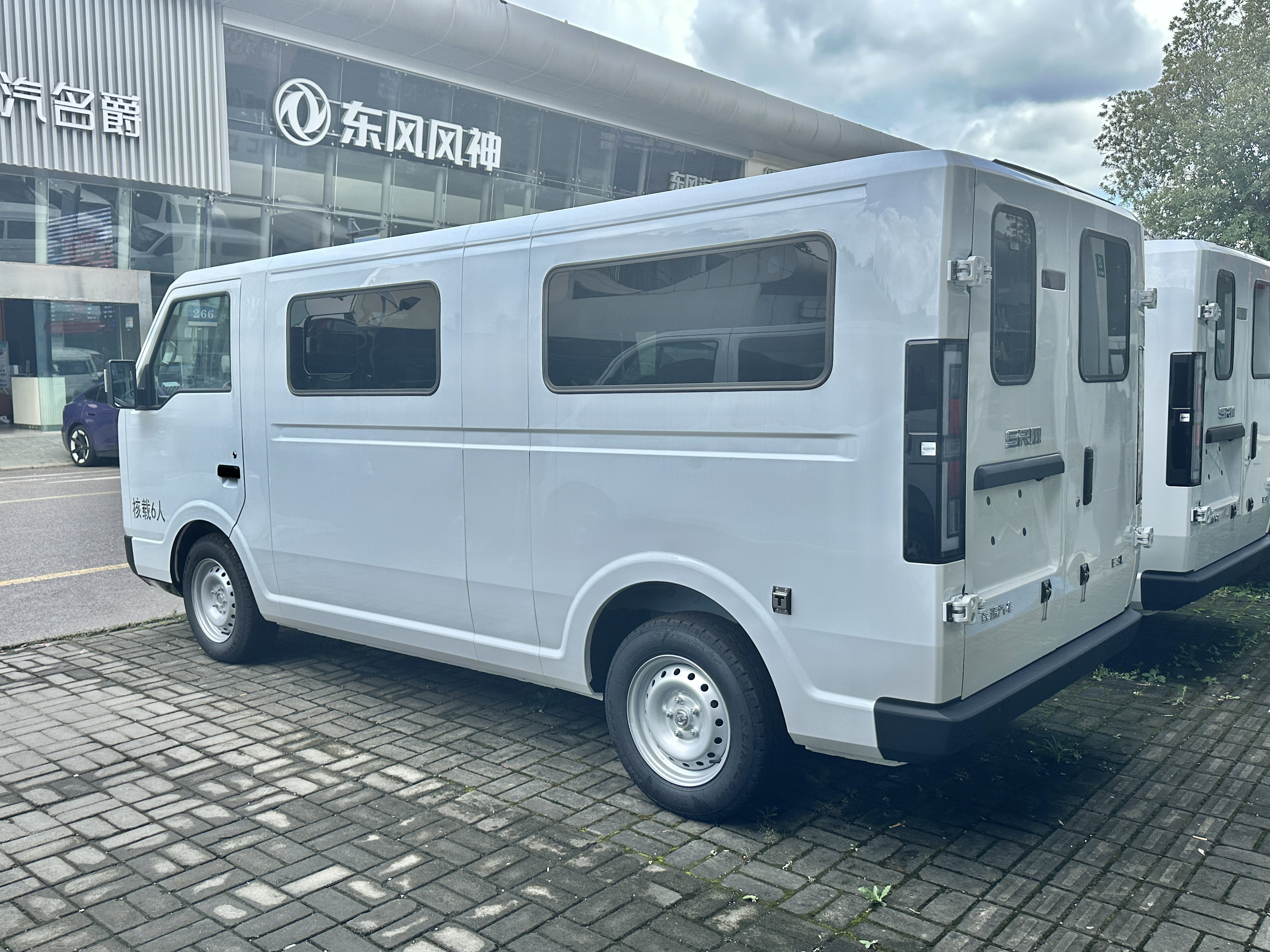
Rear view
