= SRM Jinhaishi M =

Chinese automobile

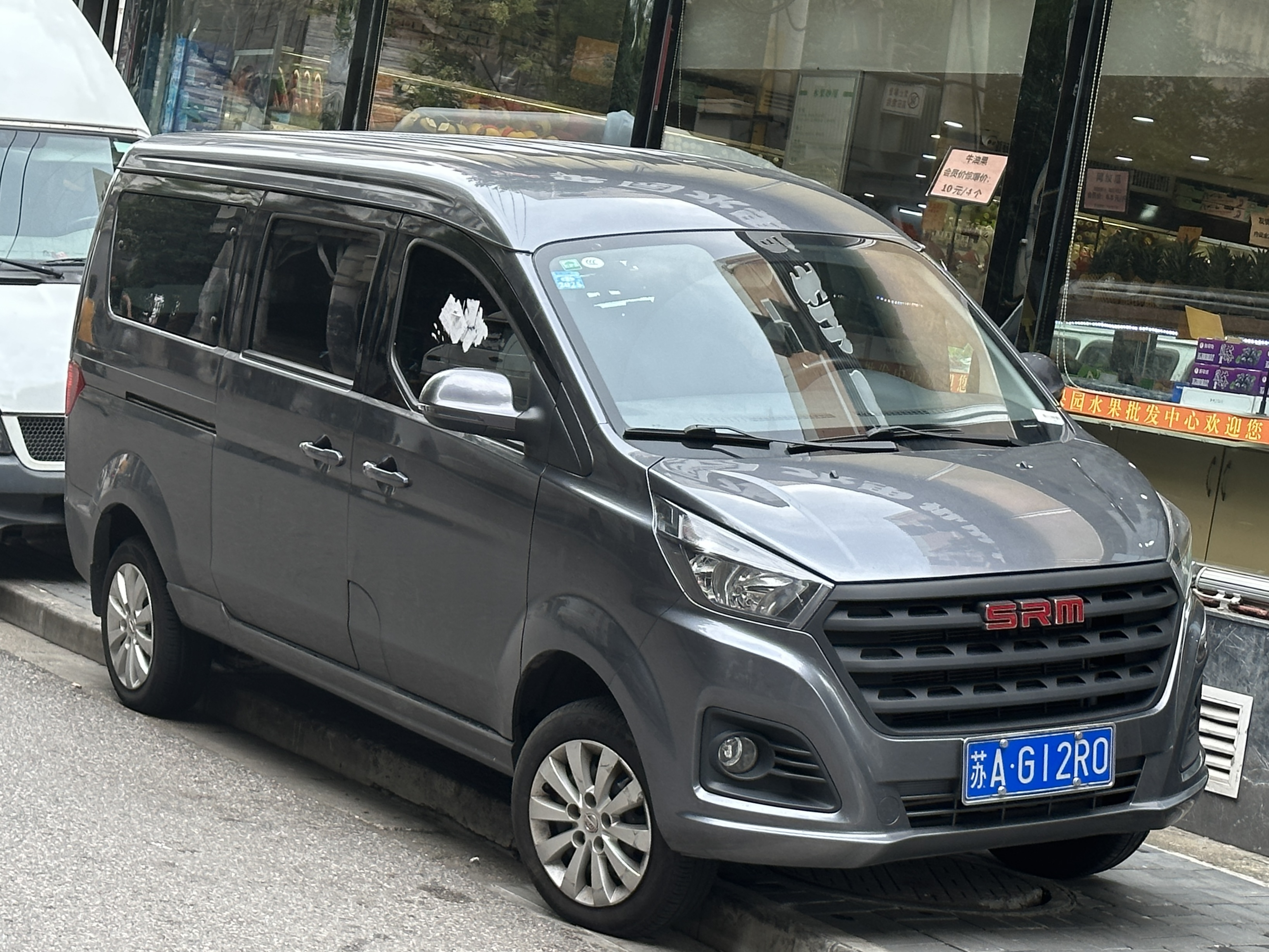
- SRM Jinhaishi M front

Overview
- Manufacturer: Shineray Group
- Production: 2022–present
- Model years: 2022–present

Body and chassis
- Class: Minivan
- Body style: 5-door wagon
- Layout: Mid-engine, rear-wheel-drive
- Related: Jinbei Haixing X30; SRM Jinhaishi

Powertrain
- Engine: 1.5 L SWD15F I4 (petrol); 1.6 L SWD16F I4 (petrol)
- Transmission: 5-speed manual

Dimensions
- Wheelbase: 2,690 mm (105.9 in)
- Length: 4,575 mm (180.1 in)
- Width: 1,700 mm (66.9 in)
- Height: 1,925 mm (75.8 in)

The SRM Jinhaishi M (金海狮 M) is a mid-size MPV produced by Chinese car manufacturer Shineray Group under the SRM marque. It is positioned under the slightly larger SRM Jinhaishi.

SRM used to produce Jinbei minivans, and serves as a joint venture between Brilliance Auto Group and Dongfang Xinyuan (鑫源) Holdings (Oriental Shineray Holdings). 80% is owned by Xinyuan Holdings and a subsidiary of Beijing North Industry owns 20% which is no longer part of Brilliance. Currently it produces microvans under the Shineray (now SRM) and SWM brands.

== Overview ==
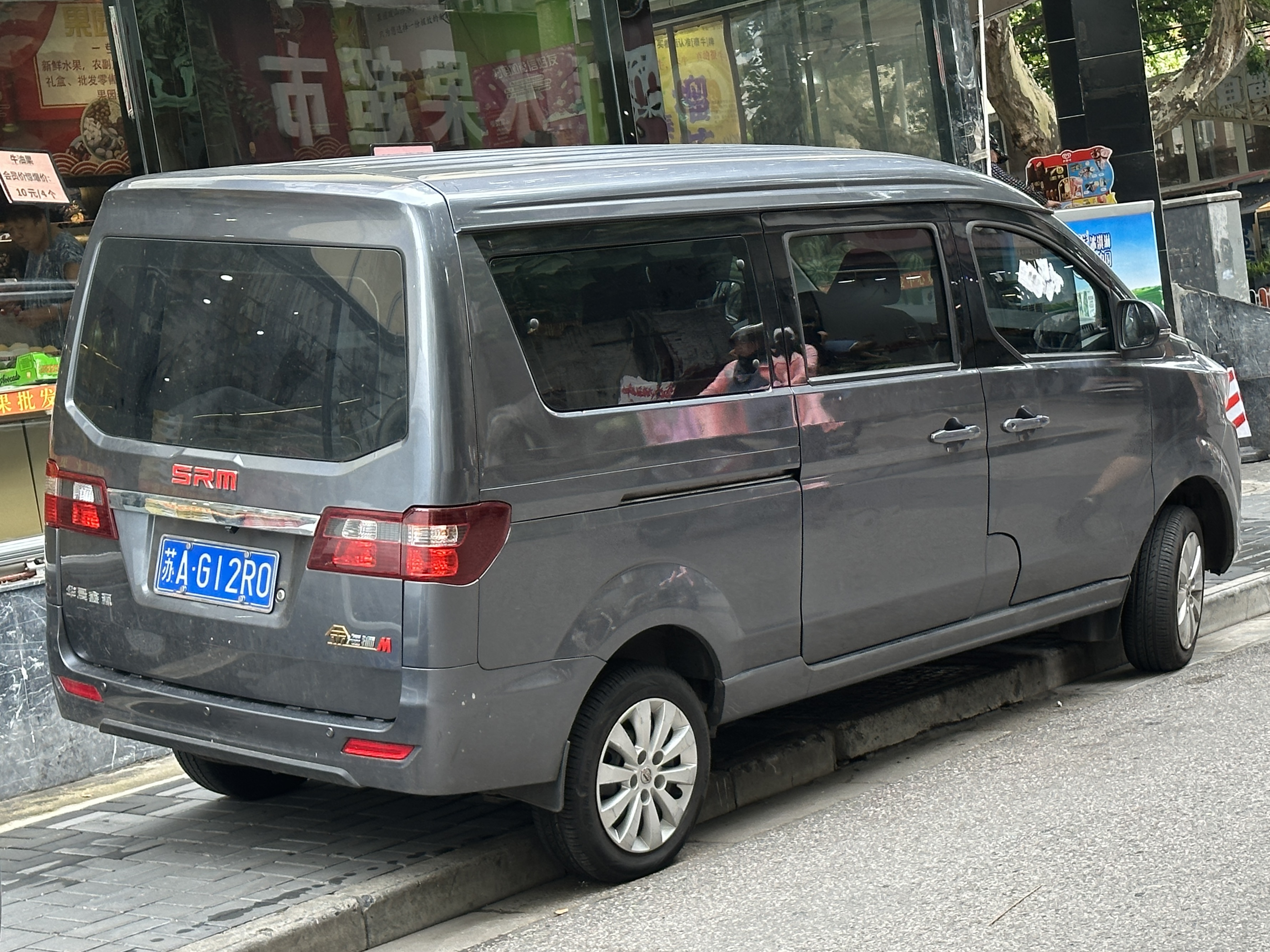
SRM Jinhaishi M rear

Based on a modified platform of the Jinbei Haixing X30, the SRM Jinhaishi M features near identical rear end to the Jinbei Haixing X30 while featuring a completely redesigned front cabin shared mostly with the SRM Jinhaishi. The SRM Jinhaishi M was released by Brilliance Auto in July, 2022 and offers seating for up to 8 passengers.

Built by Brilliance Xinyuan Chongqing Auto (华晨鑫源), originally the Chongqing branch of Brilliance Auto, the SRM Jinhaishi M was offered with a 1.5-liter engine that produces 112 hp for the base model and a 1.6-liter unit developing 120 hp for higher trim models. Each engine is paired with a 5-speed manual transmission.
