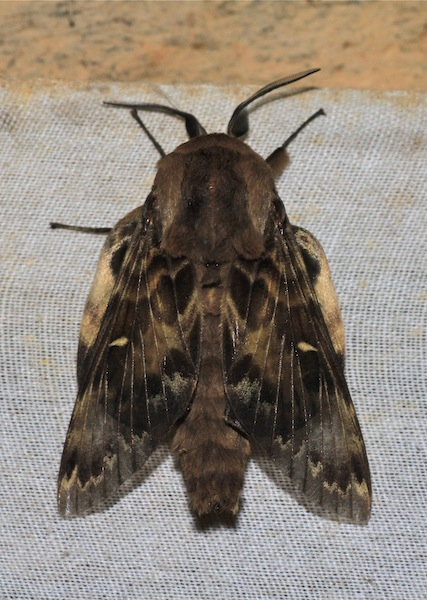

Scientific classification
- Kingdom: Animalia
- Phylum: Arthropoda
- Clade: Pancrustacea
- Class: Insecta
- Order: Lepidoptera
- Family: Lasiocampidae
- Genus: Bhima
- Species: B. borneana

Binomial name
- Bhima borneana Holloway, 1987

= Bhima borneana =

Species of moth

Bhima borneana is a species of moth of the family Lasiocampidae first described by Jeremy Daniel Holloway in 1987. It is found on Borneo. The wing markings are dull, ochreous, pale brown, rather than grey, also the thorax; the pale area of the hindwing is more extensive.

The wingspan is 25–27 mm.
