= Shineray Group =

Chinese conglomerate

East Shineray Group Co., Ltd.
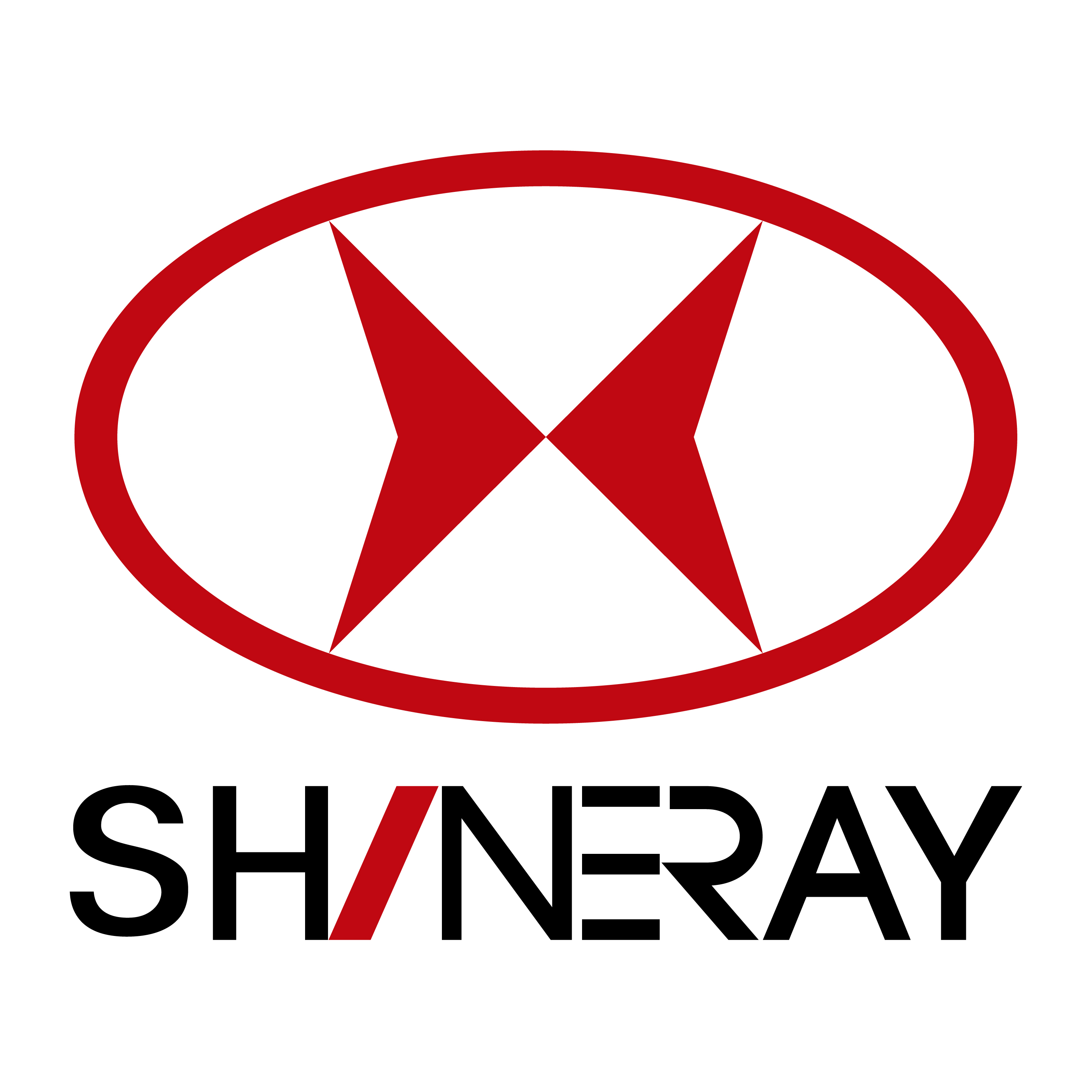
- Trade name: Shineray Group
- Type: Private Enterprise
- Industry: Automotive; Motorcycle
- Founded: 1997; 29 years ago
- Founder: Gong Daxing
- Headquarters: Chongqing, China
- Area served: Worldwide
- Subsidiaries: SWM Motorcycles; SWM Motors
- Website: www.shineray.com

Shineray Group (Chinese: 鑫源集团) is a multinational manufacturing enterprise based in China, with core businesses spanning the R&D, manufacturing, and sales of automobiles, motorcycles, agricultural machinery, and powertrains. The group started with motorcycle manufacturing and gradually expanded into the automotive sector, implementing a global strategy.The group is the owner of the Italian motorcycle brand SWM.

Shineray Group also formed a joint venture with Brilliance Auto Group to produce SWM branded automobiles and motorcycles in Chongqing, China.

== Group History and Overview ==
Shineray Group was founded by Mr. Gong Daxing. Its motorcycle business began in 1997 (Chongqing Shineray Motorcycle Co., Ltd.), and the "SHINERAY" brand was officially adopted in 2002. In 2007, the group formally established Shineray Automobile Co., Ltd., entering the automotive manufacturing industry.

The group is headquartered in Chongqing, China. Its automotive brands include SRM Shineray, SWM Motors, and Jinbei, with products covering SUVs, MPVs, minivans, mini-trucks, and new energy vehicles. Its motorcycle brands mainly include "Shineray", "SWM", and the new energy-focused "Binsen".

== Business Segments and Operations ==
- Automotive Manufacturing (Shineray Automobile)

Shineray Automobile holds full qualifications for independent production across all vehicle categories (including new energy vehicles) and operates two major production bases in Chongqing: Fuling (annual capacity of 300,000 passenger vehicles and 300,000 engines) and High-tech Zone (annual capacity of 100,000 commercial vehicles). Additionally, its manufacturing footprint extends to Vietnam and Italy.

As of July 2024, Shineray Automobile products have entered nearly 50 global markets, including Germany, Spain, Russia, South Korea, Singapore, and Uzbekistan, with over 2,000 global service outlets and cumulative sales exceeding 1.5 million units.

Shineray Automobile has established strategic partnerships in the new energy sector with companies such as FinDreams Power (BYD), CATL, iFLYTEK, and Tencent.

- Motorcycle Manufacturing

Chongqing Shineray Motorcycle Co., Ltd. is the main entity for the group's motorcycle business, with an annual production capacity of 500,000 motorcycle units and 1 million motorcycle engines. The company offers over 150 models across various types including cruisers, underbones, off-road, scooters, street bikes, ATVs, and ADVs, sold in over 100 countries and regions worldwide.

Shineray Motorcycle has also accelerated its presence in the African market. In November 2024, its dual brands SHINERAY and SWM were featured at a exhibition in Nigeria, with plans to target the West African market initially, aiming for annual motorcycle sales of 10,000 units. Furthermore, its Brazilian subsidiary (Shineray do Brasil) opened its first store in São Paulo in late 2021 and launched electric motorcycle products.

== Global Layout and Technology R&D ==
Shineray Group pursues an active global strategy, forming an industrial layout centered in Chongqing, China, radiating to Southeast Asia, Central Asia, West Asia, Europe, and the Americas. It has design and R&D centers in Milan, Italy and Chongqing, China, focusing on vehicle design, engine development, performance calibration, and new energy technology R&D.

Technologically, Shineray Automobile has mastered three core technologies: vehicle system integration and matching, vehicle control systems, and electric drive systems, and has launched its self-developed "King Kong Drill" series of engines. Its "KeE Pure Electric Platform" integrates chassis systems, three-electric systems (battery, motor, electronic control), and vehicle intelligence systems.

== SRM Shineray ==
SRM Shineray is the NEV brand of Shineray Group which cooperates with Brilliance Automotive. Brilliance Automotive sells light commercial vehicles under the Jinbei brand which shares the platform for electric SRM Shineray light commercial vehicles. Prior to Brilliance, SRM had a working relationship with FAW, which was terminated.

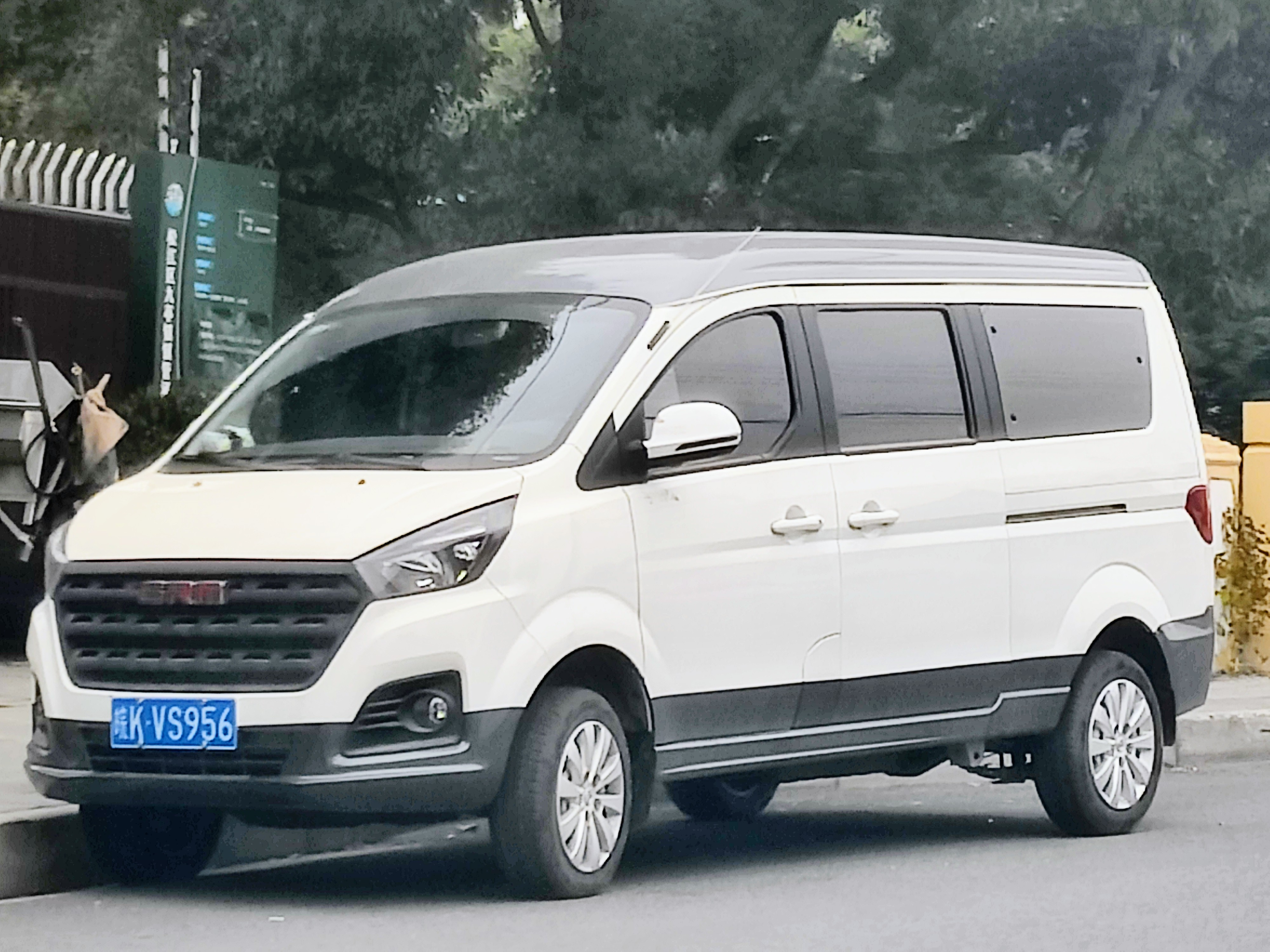
SRM Jinhaishi M

As of October 2020, the DST Shenzhou No.5 (DST神州5号) by Hangtianshenzhou Automobiles (航天神州汽车) based on the SRM Shineray Haoyun No.1 was revealed, with the model being a rebadge despite still wearing the SRM Shineray logo.

== SWM automobile ==
SWM Automobiles is a Chinese automobile manufacturer and a subsidiary of Shineray Group (鑫源集团). The brand utilizes the historic Italian SWM name, originally known for motorcycles^{[}, for its line of passenger vehicles, primarily SUVs and MPVs, targeting the affordable segment of the market

=== History and Background ===
- Italian Origins and Acquisition (1971-2014)

The SWM brand was founded in Italy in 1971, originally manufacturing motorcycles where it gained recognition in off-road competition. The brand faced financial difficulties and became inactive in the late 1980s. In January 2014, the Chinese industrial conglomerate Shineray Holdings (鑫源控股) acquired the SWM brand outright.

- Transition to Automobiles (2016)

Following the acquisition, Shineray Holdings leveraged the brand recognition of SWM to enter the passenger car market. The SWM Automobiles brand was officially launched in July 2016 in Beijing, China. Its first product, the SWM X7 SUV, began production earlier that year in January at Shineray's facility in Fuling, Chongqing. This strategic move utilized the European heritage of the SWM name for its new line of vehicles.

=== Operations and Product Lines ===
SWM Automobiles focuses on designing, engineering, and selling passenger vehicles, mainly SUVs.

1. Design and R&D: The company maintains design and research and development centers in Milan, Italy, and Chongqing, China, aiming to blend Italian stylistic elements with its engineering and manufacturing processes.
2. Manufacturing: Primary production takes place at a manufacturing base in the Fuling District of Chongqing, which has a reported annual capacity of 300,000 vehicles and 300,000 engines.
3. Product Portfolio: The brand's vehicle lineup encompasses SUVs and MPVs. Models include the G01 (including a G01 FF variant), G05, X3, and G03F EDi/Big Tiger (大虎) SUVs. These vehicles typically feature turbocharged gasoline engines and are positioned in the competitive affordable segment of the Chinese market.
4. Global Sales: SWM Automobiles markets its vehicles in numerous countries outside China, including export markets in Europe, South America, and Southeast Asia.

=== Notable Vehicles ===
- SWM X7: The first production vehicle launched by the brand in 2016[1][2].
- SWM G05: A midsize SUV. In May 2025, it reported sales of 209 units in China, representing a significant year-over-year increase.
- SWM G01 FF: A compact SUV offering various trim levels with features like panoramic sunroofs, leather seats, and driver assistance systems.
- SWM G03F EDi/Big Tiger (大虎): An SUV available in configurations like a 1.5L 7-seater.

== Products ==
SRM Shineray products are rebadged vehicles based on Jinbei products.

=== Microvans ===
- SRM Shineray E3/SRM Shineray E3L
- SRM Shineray X30L
- SRM Shineray X30LEV
- SRM Shineray Haoyun No.1
- SRM Shineray Haoyun No.2
- SRM Shineray Small Haise EV
- SRM Jinhaishi M
- SRM Jinhaishi
- Shineray Xiangshang V6

=== Light trucks ===
- SRM Shineray T20S
- SRM Shineray T20EV
- SRM Shineray T22S
- SRM Shineray T30S
- SRM Shineray T32S
- SRM Shineray T50EV

=== Motorcycles ===
- Shineray XY50
- Shineray XY100
- Shineray XY125
- Shineray XY150
- Shineray XY200
- Shineray XY250
- Shineray XY400
- Shineray XY650
