= Esemka Bima =

Light commercial vehicle

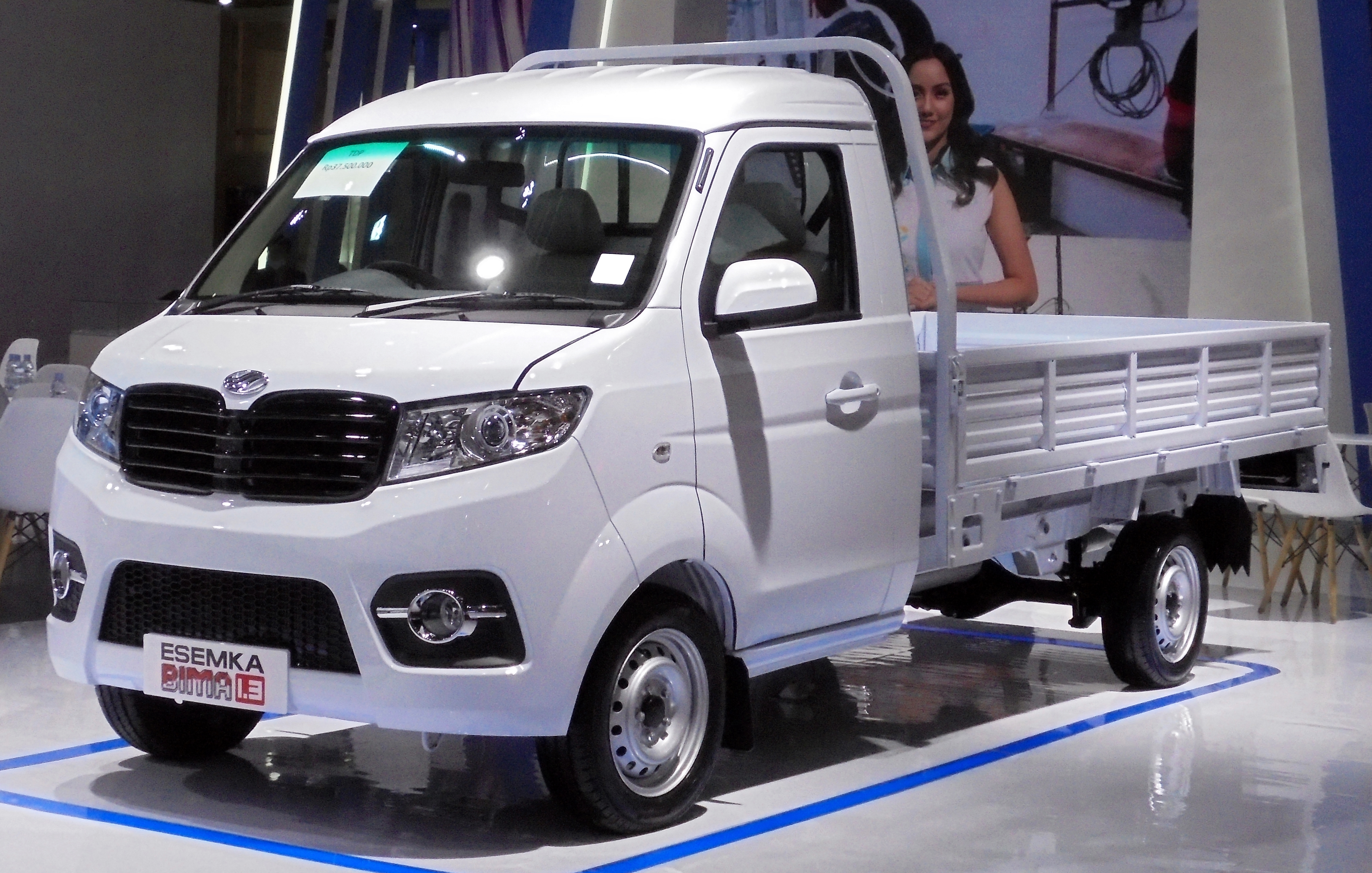
- Esemka Bima 1.3

Overview
- Manufacturer: Esemka
- Also called: Chana Star 5 (Bima 1.2); Jinbei T30 (Bima 1.3); SRM Shineray X30LEV (Bima EV)
- Production: September 2019 – July 2021
- Assembly: Indonesia: Boyolali, Central Java (Esemka, Bima 1.2/1.3); China: Chongqing (Shineray Group, Bima EV)

Body and chassis
- Class: Light commercial vehicle
- Body style: 2-door pickup (Bima 1.2/1.3); 5-door van/panel van (Bima EV)
- Layout: Front mid-engine, rear-wheel-drive (Bima 1.2/1.3); Front mid-motor, rear-wheel-drive (Bima EV)

Powertrain
- Engine: Petrol: 1,243 cc (1.2 L; 75.9 cu in) E-Power I4 (Bima 1.2); 1,298 cc (1.3 L; 79.2 cu in) DLCG12 I4 (Bima 1.3)
- Electric motor: TM4018 permanent-magnet synchronous (Bima EV)
- Power output: 72 kW (97 hp; 98 PS) (Bima 1.2); 63 kW (84 hp; 86 PS) (Bima 1.3); 75 kW (101 hp; 102 PS) (Bima EV)
- Transmission: 5-speed manual (Bima 1.2/1.3)
- Battery: 49.1 kWh ternary lithium (Bima EV)
- Range: 300 km (190 mi) (Bima EV, claimed)

Dimensions
- Wheelbase: 2,900 mm (114.2 in) (Bima 1.2); 3,050 mm (120.1 in) (Bima 1.3); 2,925 mm (115.2 in) (Bima EV)
- Length: 4,560 mm (179.5 in) (Bima 1.2); 4,930 mm (194.1 in) (Bima 1.3); 4,495 mm (177.0 in) (Bima EV)
- Width: 1,645 mm (64.8 in) (Bima 1.2); 1,720 mm (67.7 in) (Bima 1.3); 1,680 mm (66.1 in) (Bima EV)
- Height: 1,890 mm (74.4 in) (Bima 1.2); 1,995 mm (78.5 in) (Bima 1.3); 1,990 mm (78.3 in) (Bima EV)
- Kerb weight: 1,070 kg (2,359 lb) (Bima 1.2); 1,250 kg (2,756 lb) (Bima 1.3)

The Esemka Bima is a series of pickup trucks and vans manufactured by the Indonesian carmaker Esemka. It is the first product that is being mass-produced by the company, mainly locally assembled at Solo Manufaktur Kreasi (SMK, pronounced "esemka" in Indonesian) manufacturing facility in Boyolali, Central Java for pickup truck models. The Bima was launched on 6 September 2019. A total of 26 local component manufacturers supplied parts for the pickup, including INKA. The company claimed the Bima is built with 60–62 percent of locally produced parts. Despite being built locally, the blueprint design of the Bima is allegedly identical to the Changan, Jinbei, and Shineray pickup trucks, although the company did not confirm this explicitly.

The battery electric van variant was launched on 16 February 2023 at the 30th Indonesia International Motor Show as the Bima EV. Based on the 1.3 model, it is imported from China instead of being manufactured locally for study and technology transfer reasons.

== History ==
The Bima nameplate was first registered in 2012, along with the Rajawali SUV. Esemka claimed that they would be partnered with Chinese carmakers Chery and Foday to build the car at the time. The Bima was proposed to be a low-cost pickup truck equipped with a 1.1-litre petrol engine and would be targeted to rural farmers. Later in 2013, 40 units of the Bima and Rajawali had been delivered.
