= SRM Jinhaishi =

Chinese automobile

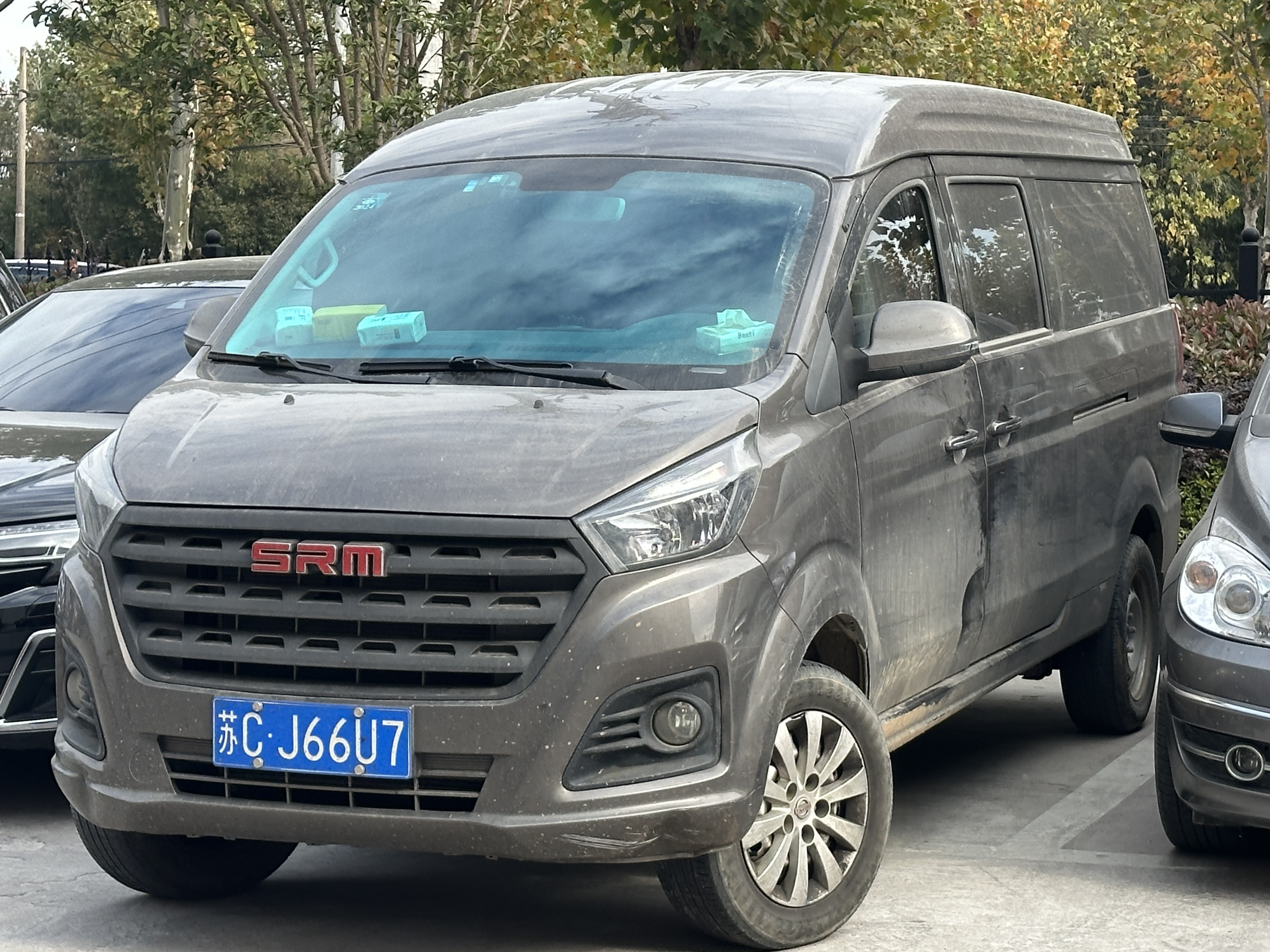
- SRM Jinhaishi front

Overview
- Manufacturer: Shineray Group
- Also called: SKM M7 (Russia)
- Production: 2021–present (China); 2026–present (Russia)
- Assembly: China, Chongqing; Russia, Tolyatti (AvtoVAZ)

Body and chassis
- Class: Minivan
- Body style: 5-door wagon
- Layout: Mid-engine, rear-wheel-drive
- Related: Jinbei Haise X30L; SRM Jinhaishi M

Powertrain
- Engine: 1.3 L DLCG12 I4 (petrol); 1.5 L SWC15M I4 (petrol); 1.5 L DLCG14 I4 (petrol)
- Transmission: 5-speed manual

Dimensions
- Wheelbase: 3,185 mm (125.4 in)
- Length: 4,890 mm (192.5 in)
- Width: 1,700 mm (66.9 in)
- Height: 1,995 mm (78.5 in)

The SRM Jinhaishi (金海狮) is a midsize MPV produced by Chinese car manufacturer Shineray Group under the SRM marque.

SRM used to produce Jinbei minivans, and serves as a joint venture between Brilliance Auto Group and Dongfang Xinyuan (鑫源) Holdings (Oriental Shineray Holdings). 80% is owned by Xinyuan Holdings and a subsidiary of Beijing North Industry owns 20% which is no longer part of Brilliance. Currently it produces microvans under the Shineray (now SRM) and SWM brands.

== Overview ==
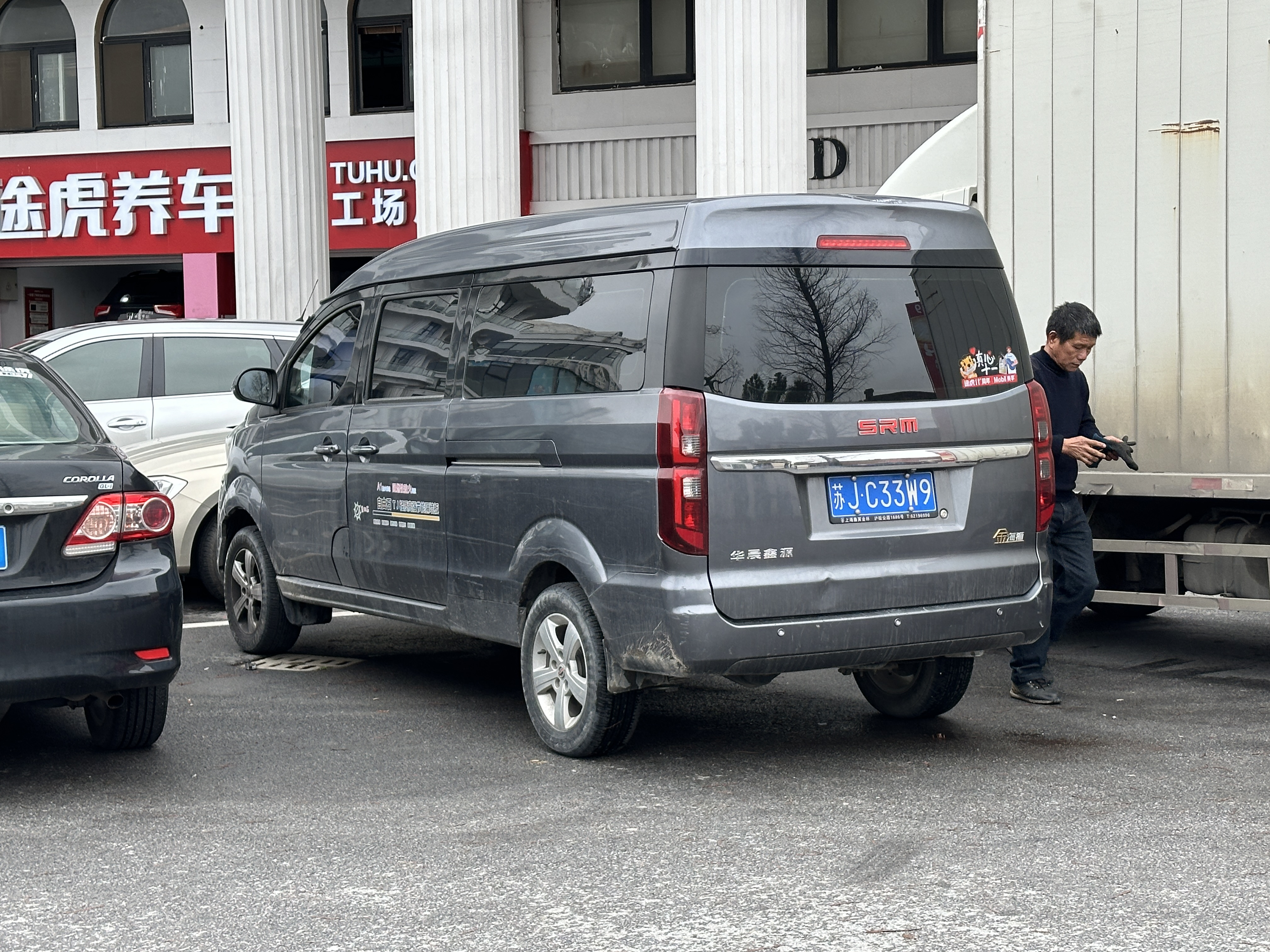
SRM Jinhaishi rear

Based on a modified platform of the Jinbei Haise X30L, the SRM Jinhaishi features near identical rear end to the Jinbei Haise X30L while featuring a completely redesigned front cabin. The SRM Jinhaishi was released by Brilliance Auto in September, 2021 and offers up to 18 seating configurations, including a 2, 5, 6, 7, and 9 seater models.

Built by Brilliance Xinyuan Chongqing Auto (华晨鑫源), originally the Chongqing branch of Brilliance Auto, the SRM Jinhaishi was offered with a 1.5 liter naturally aspirated engine producing 78kW, a 1.6 liter naturally aspirated engine producing 85kW, and a 2.0liter naturally aspirated engine producing 101kW, all paired with a 5-speed manual transmission.
