= Jinbei Haise X30L =

Chinese automobile

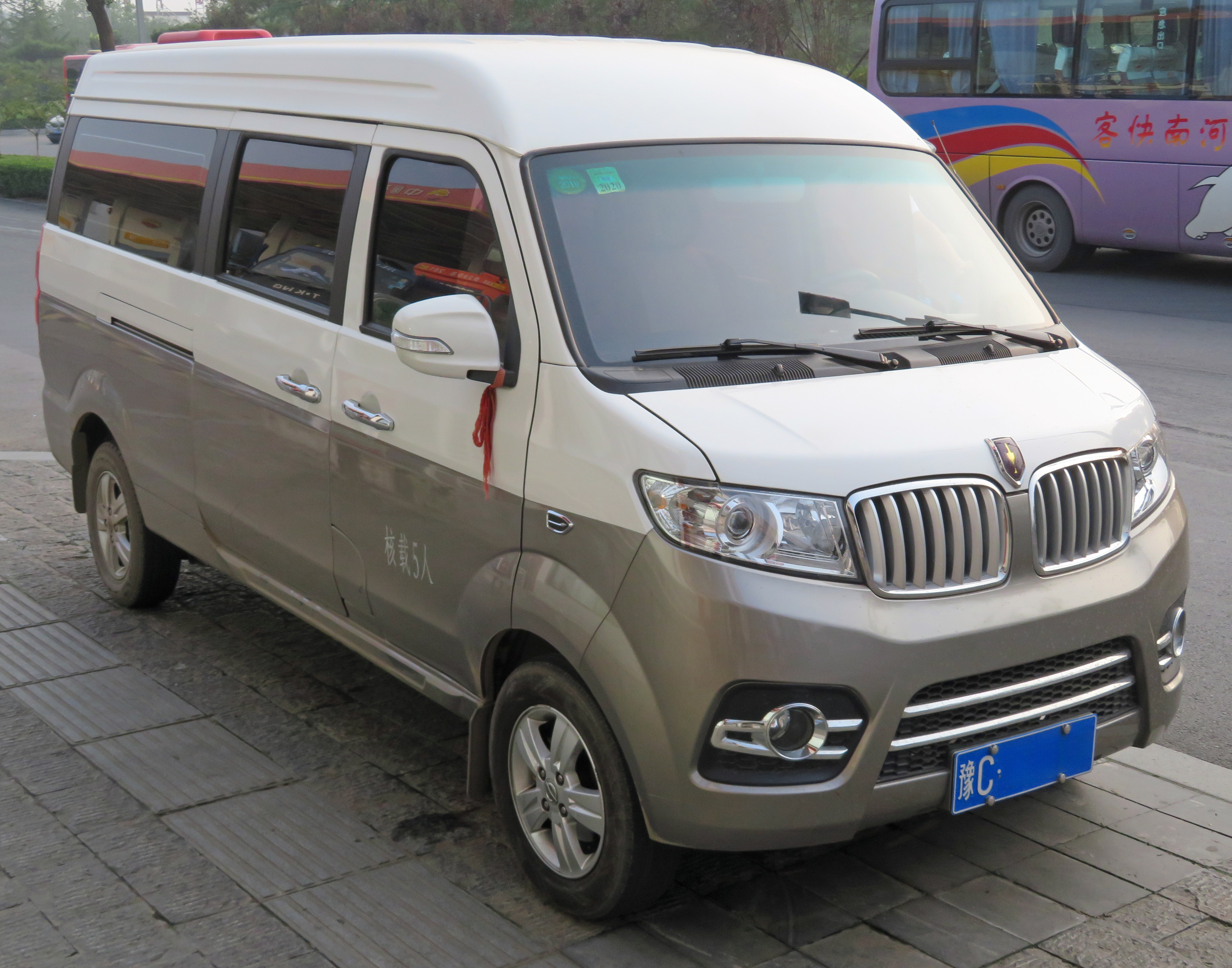
- Jinbei New Haise

Overview
- Manufacturer: Brilliance Shineray
- Also called: Jinbei New Haise; Jinbei Haise S (facelift); Jinbei T50 (single cab pickup, heavy duty)/ T52 (crew cab pickup, heavy duty); Jinbei T30 (single cab pickup)/ T32 (crew cab pickup)/ Jinka S2 (single cab pickup); SRM Shineray X30L; SRM Shineray X30LEV (electric van); SRM Shineray Haoyun No.1 (electric panel van); Hangtianshenzhou Automobiles DST Shenzhou No.5 (electric panel van); Dongfeng EM13 (electric panel van); Farizon E5L (electric panel van); Ankai T3/ Kuaileyun (electric panel van); Esemka Bima 1.3 (pickup, Indonesia); Esemka Bima EV (electric pickup, Indonesia); Jeis Mobility ET Van (South Korea); Elaris Caro S (Germany)
- Production: 2014–present

Body and chassis
- Class: Leisure activity vehicle/panel van (M)
- Body style: 5-door wagon 2-door pickup (Jinbei Jinka S2)
- Layout: Mid-engine, rear-wheel-drive
- Related: Jinbei Haixing X30; SRM Jinhaishi

Powertrain
- Engine: 1.3 L DLCG12 I4 (petrol); 1.5 L SWC15M I4 (petrol); 1.5 L DLCG14 I4 (petrol)
- Transmission: 5-speed manual

Dimensions
- Wheelbase: 2,925 mm (115.2 in)
- Length: 4,495 mm (177.0 in)
- Width: 1,680 mm (66.1 in)
- Height: 1,990 mm (78.3 in)

The Jinbei Haise X30L (海狮X30L) is a 7-seater van produced by Chinese car manufacturer Brilliance Auto under the Jinbei marque.

== Overview ==
Based on the same platform as the Jinbei Haixing X30, the Jinbei Haise X30L was released by Brilliance Auto in December, 2015.

Built by Brilliance Xinyuan Chongqing Auto (华晨鑫源), the Chongqing branch of Brilliance Auto, the Jinbei Haise X30L was offered with engine options including a 1.3 liter DLCG12 inline-four petrol engine, a 1.5 liter SWC15M inline-four petrol engine, and a 1.5 liter DLCG14 inline-four petrol engine, with all engines paired with a 5-speed manual transmission. Prices of the Jinbei X30 range from 35,000 yuan to 46,800 yuan.

The grille looks like that of a BMW as the parent company of Jinbei ( Brilliance Auto) is in joint venture with BMW, to manufacture BMW vehicles in China.

== Jinbei Haise S ==
The Jinbei Haise S is the facelifted version of the Jinbei Haise X30L. The Haise S features a restyled front end, replacing the BMW-inspired kidney grilles from the X30L. Engine options include a 1.5 liter engine and 1.6 liter engine with both engines mated to a 5-speed manual gearbox. Prices of the Jinbei Haise S range from 50,800 yuan to 56,800 yuan.

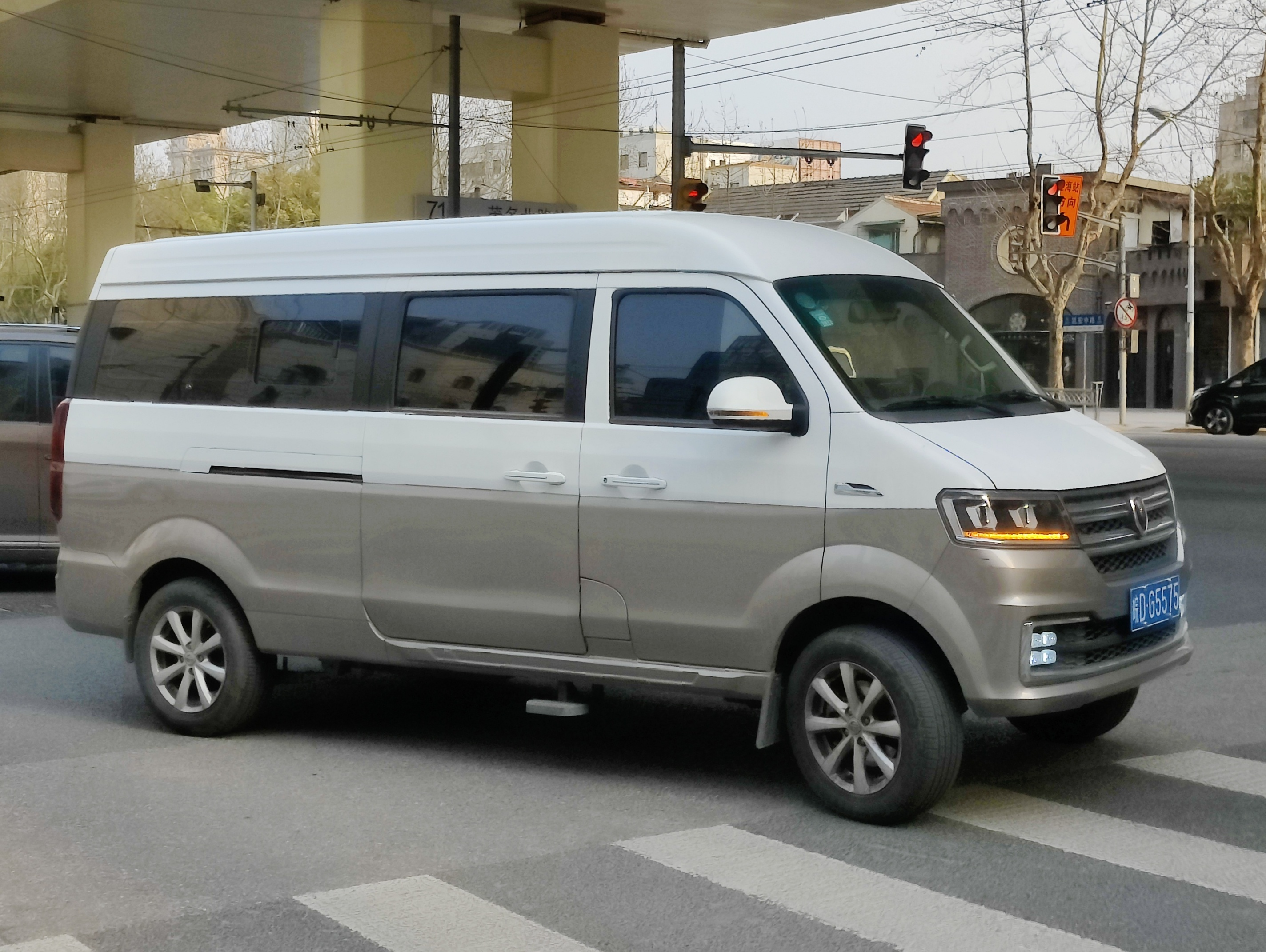
Jinbei Haise S front view

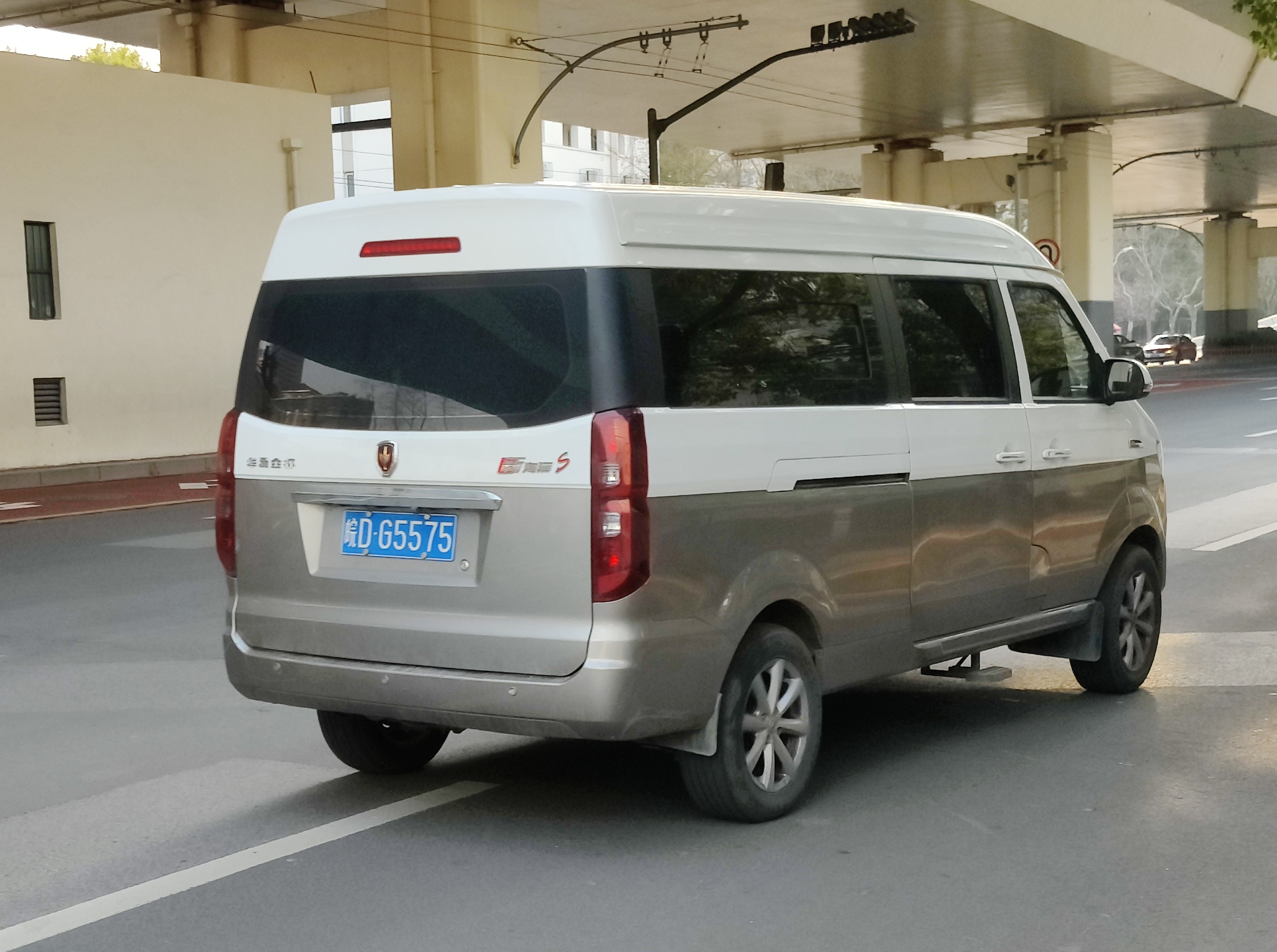
Jinbei Haise S rear view

== Pickup variants ==
The Dongfeng EM13 is an electric panel van based on the same platform as the Jinbei Haise X30L, which has been in production since 2018. The EM13 has the same dimensions as the Haise X30L and is marketed under the product model designation DFA5030XXYABEV. The Haise X30L platform has also been used for several pickup truck variants. These include the two-door Jinbei T30 and the four-door Jinbei T32 crew cab, as well as heavy-duty dually variants, the two-door Jinbei T50 and four-door Jinbei T52 crew cab. The higher-specification Jinbei Haise S has likewise been developed into pickup variants, including the two-door Jinbei S30 and four-door Jinbei S32 crew cab. In February 2023, the Jinbei S30 was relaunched under the name Jinbei Jinka S2.

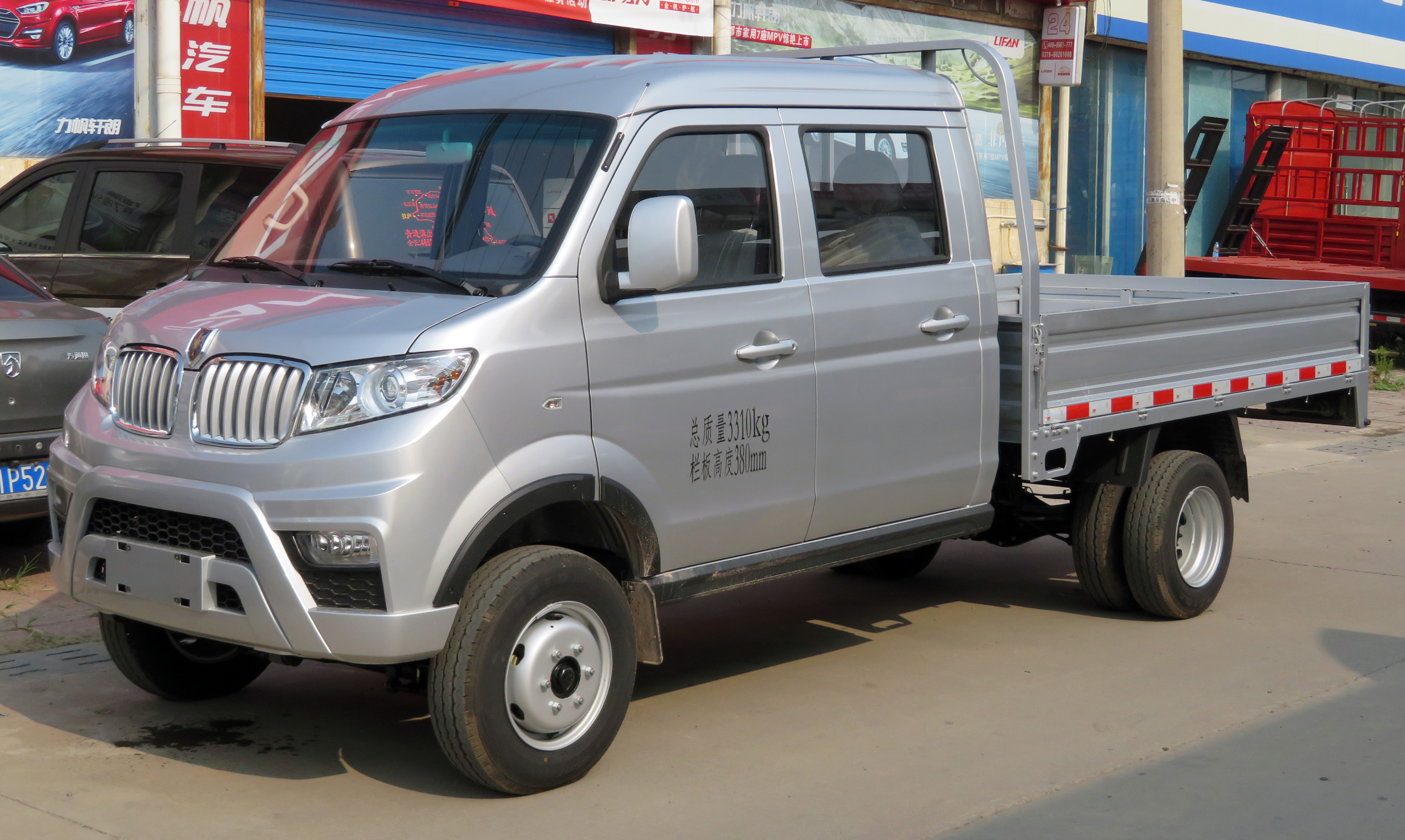
Jinbei T52 crew cab

Jinbei T52 crew cab facelift

Jinbei T52S crew cab

Jinbei T52 regular cab

Jinbei T50S

Jinbei Jinka S6

== SRM Shineray X30L/ SRM Shineray X30LEV/ SRM Shineray Haoyun No.1/ Hangtianshenzhou Automobiles DST Shenzhou No.5 ==
The SRM Shineray X30L is a rebadged version of the Jinbei Haise X30L wearing the SRM Shineray badge of Brilliance Xinyuan Chongqing Auto. The SRM Shineray X30LEV is the electric variant, while the SRM Shineray Haoyun No.1 is the electric panel van variant. The SRM Shineray X30LEV features a 49.1kWh battery and the electric range is 305 km. The SRM Shineray Haoyun No.1 panel van features a 49.1kWh battery and the electric range is 285 km.

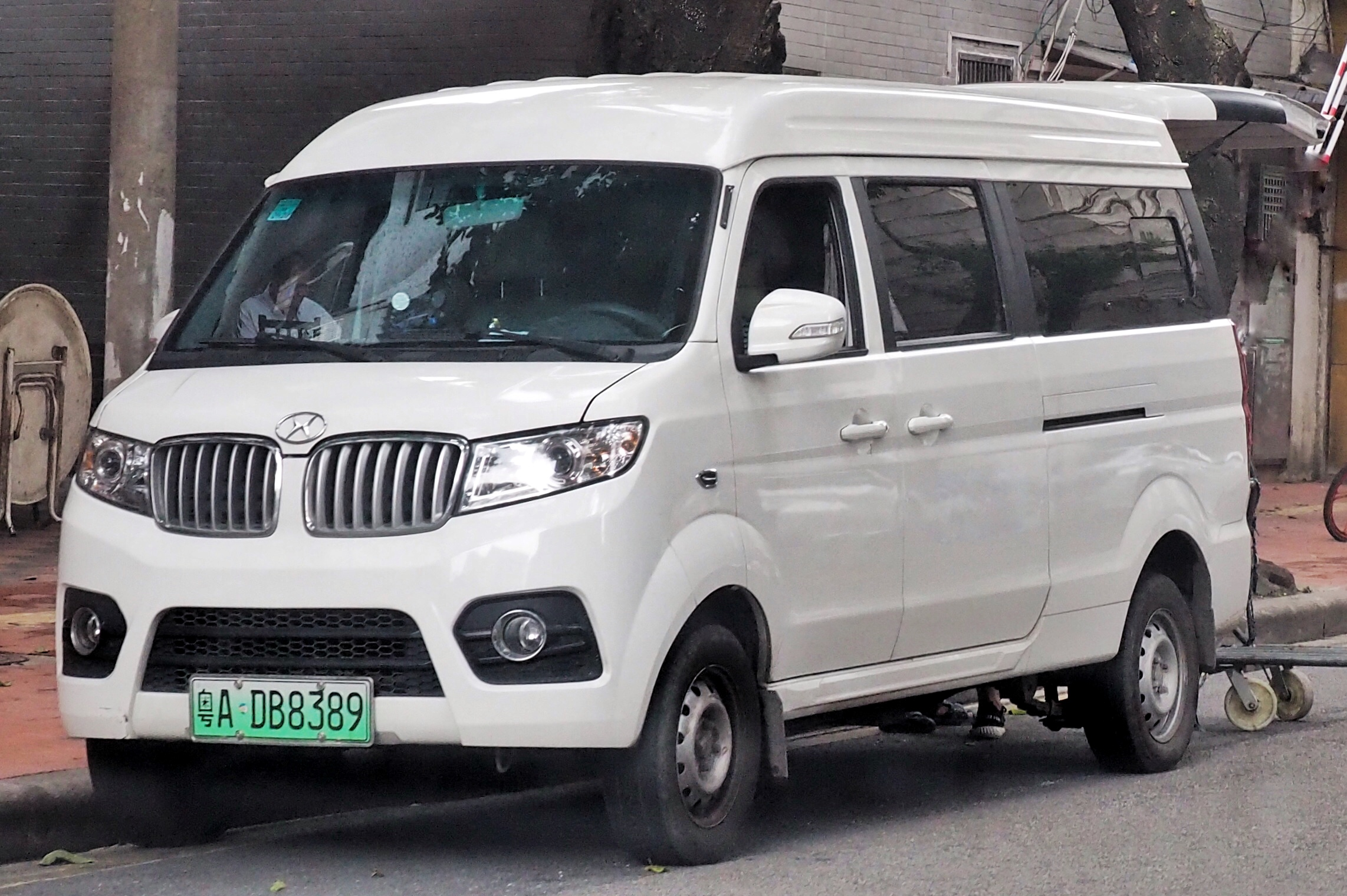
Shineray Haixing X30L EV front view

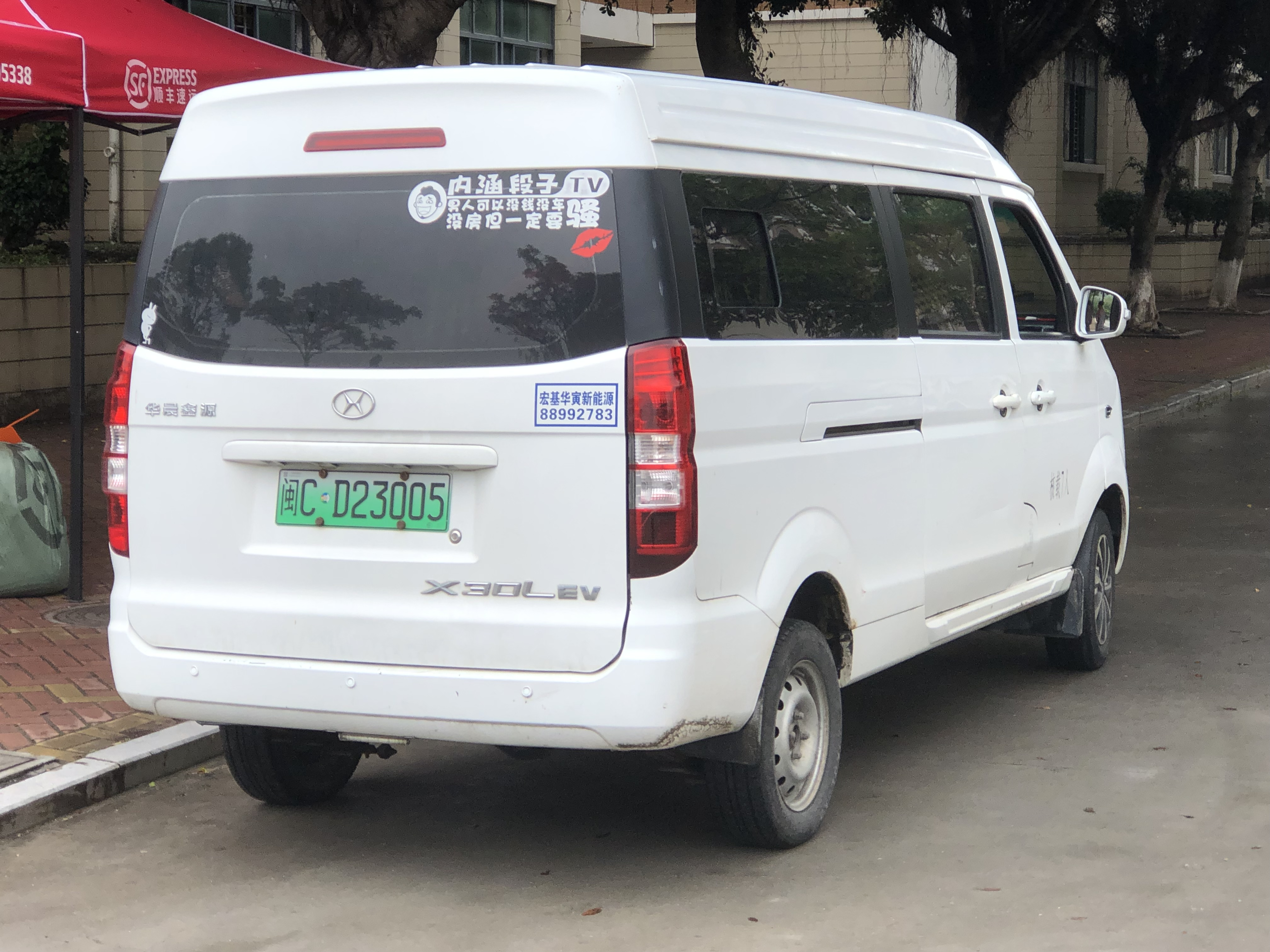
Shineray Haixing X30L EV rear view

The DST Shenzhou No.5 (DST神州5号) by Hangtianshenzhou Automobiles (航天神州汽车) is another rebadged model based on the SRM Shineray Haoyun No.1, which still displays the SRM Shineray logo. The DST Shenzhou No.5 is equipped with a rear-positioned electric motor that produces 80 hp and 220 N·m, powering the rear wheels. It features a 41.86 kWh battery, providing an electric range of 300 km.

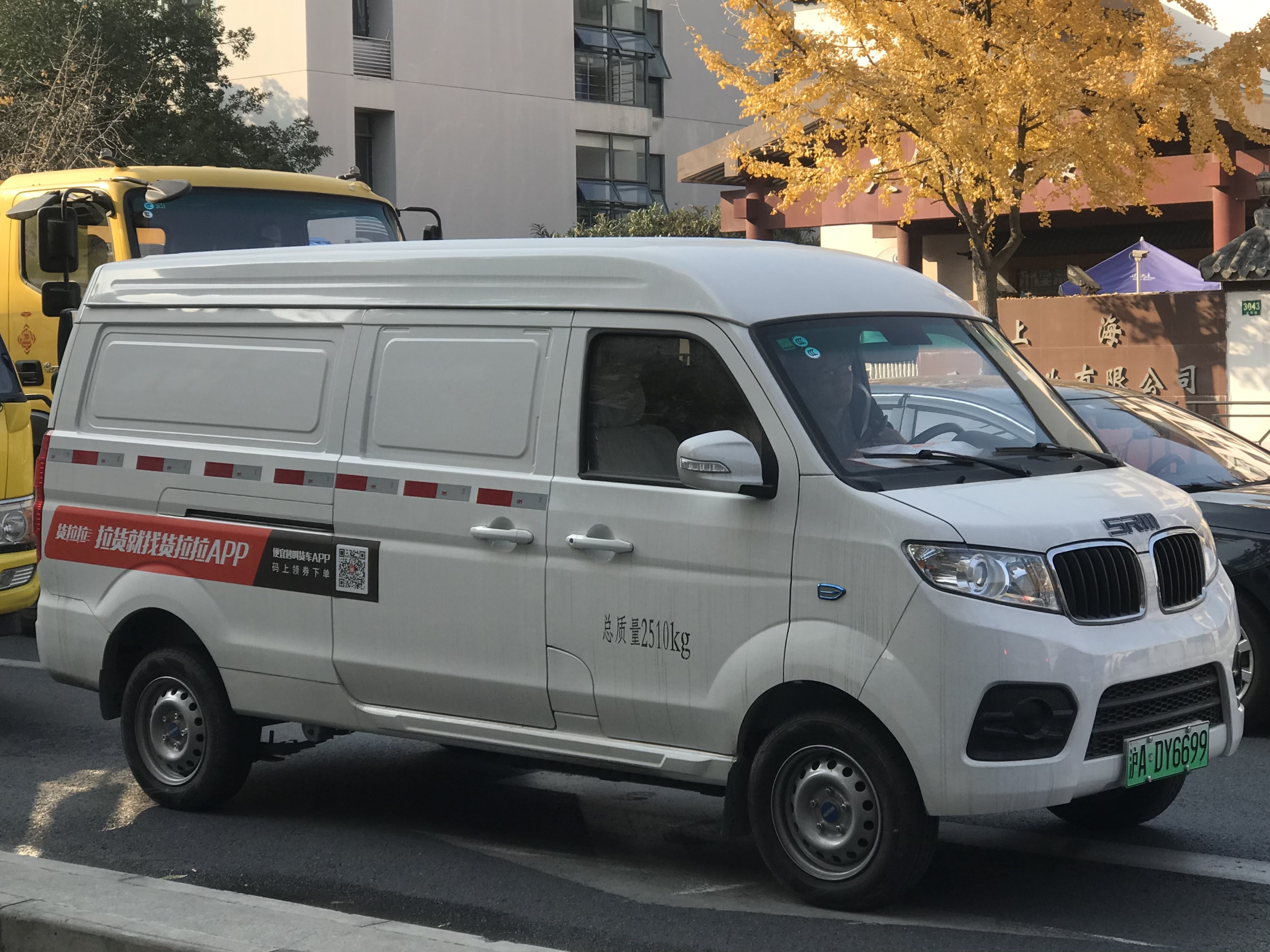
DST Shenzhou No.5 panel van (front)

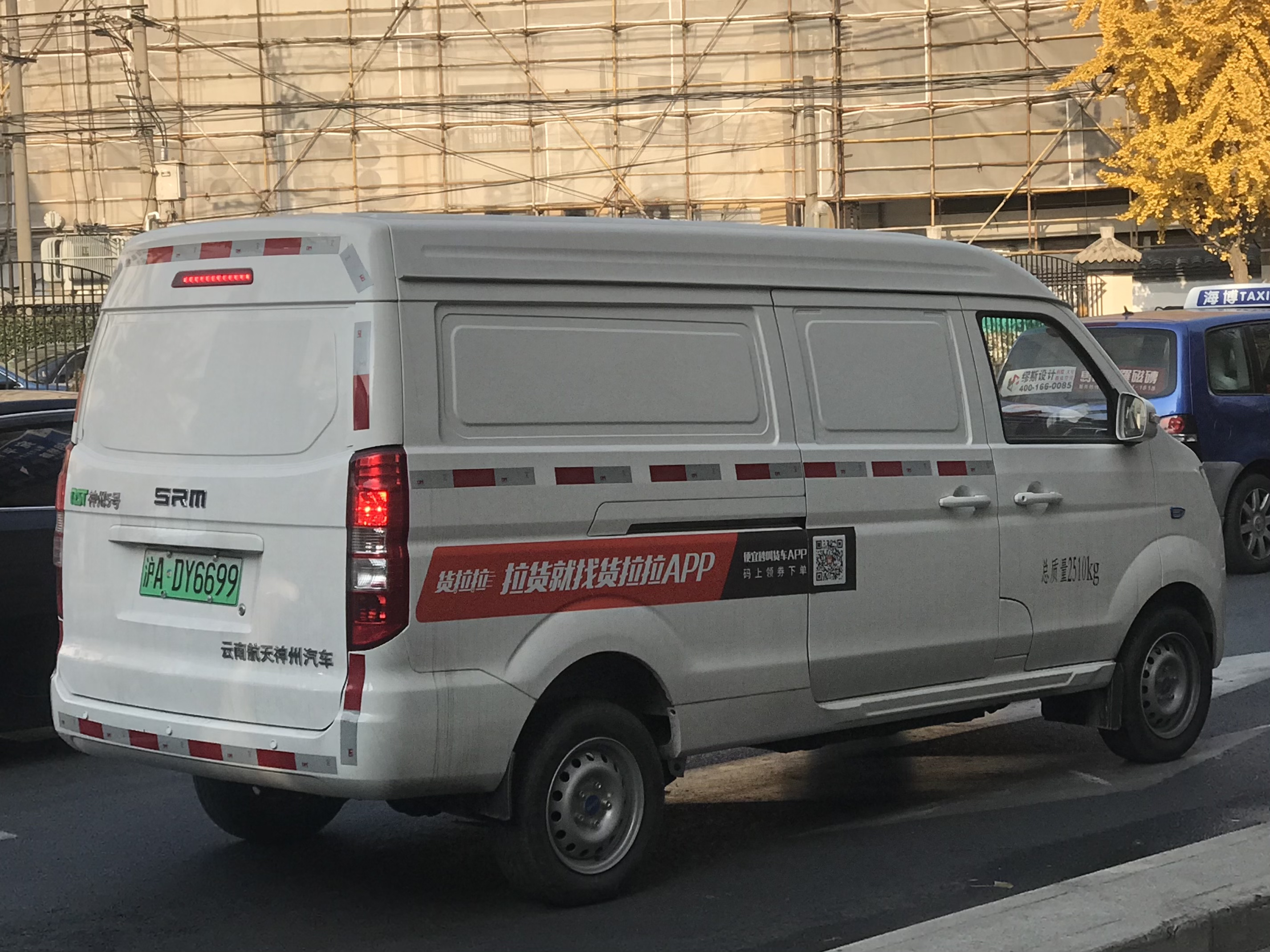
DST Shenzhou No.5 panel van (rear)
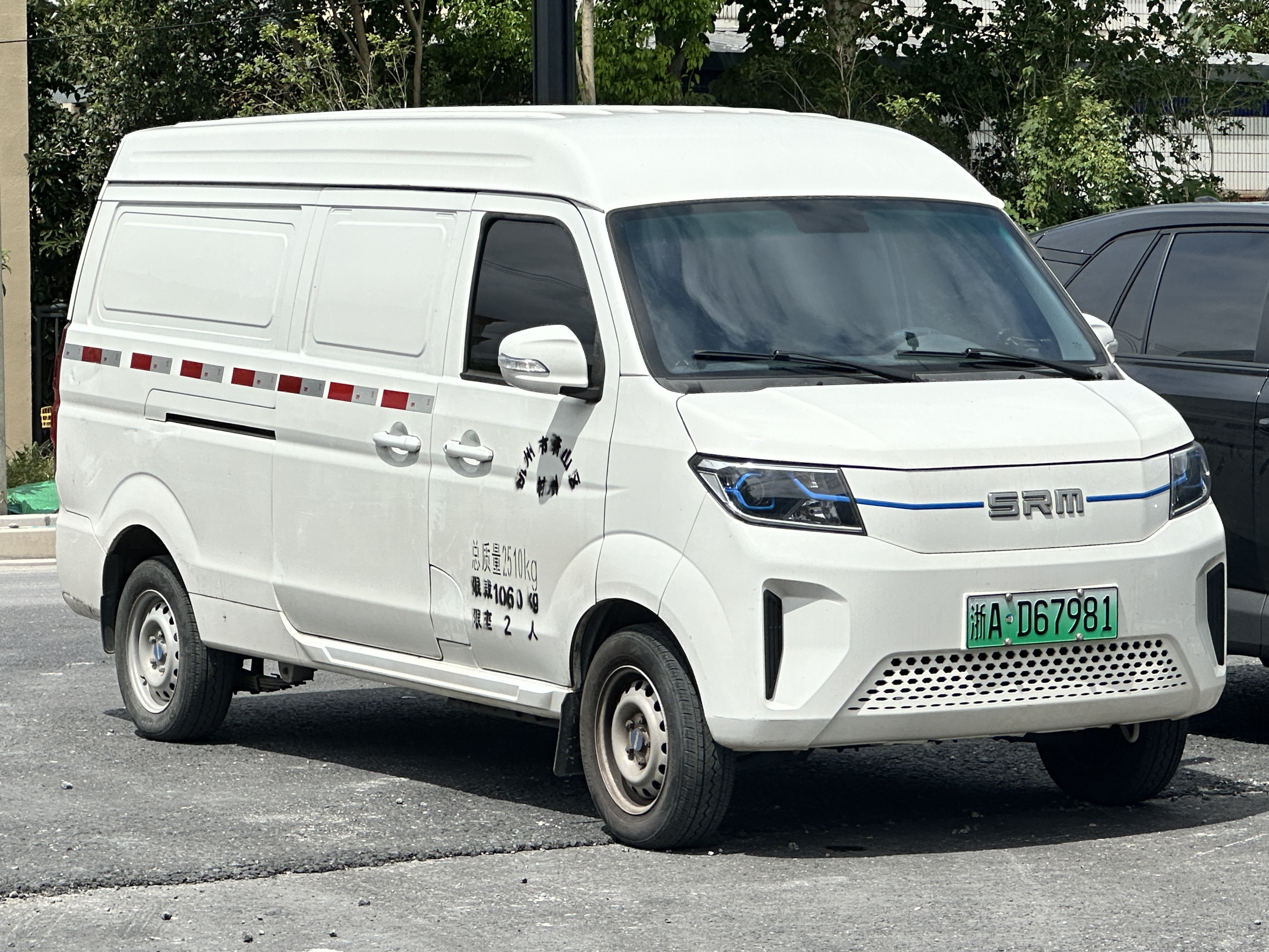
SRM Shineray Haoyun 2025 facelift

Rear (With barn doors)

== Dongfeng EM13 Electric panel van ==
The Dongfeng EM13 is a rebadged electric panel van sharing the same platforms of the Jinbei Haise X30L, produced since 2018. Dimensions are exactly the same as the Jinbei Haixing X30L with product model names DFA5030XXYABEV and DFA5030XXYABEV1. Payload of the Dongfeng EM13 DFA5030XXYABEV is 1440 kg with a capacity of 2 occupants. Payload of the Dongfeng EM13 DFA5030XXYABEVa is 860 kg with a capacity of 2+3 occupants. Both models of the Dongfeng EM13 utilize the permanent magnet synchronization motors with motor parameters 40/75kW and 72/165Nm. Driving range can exceed 220 km.

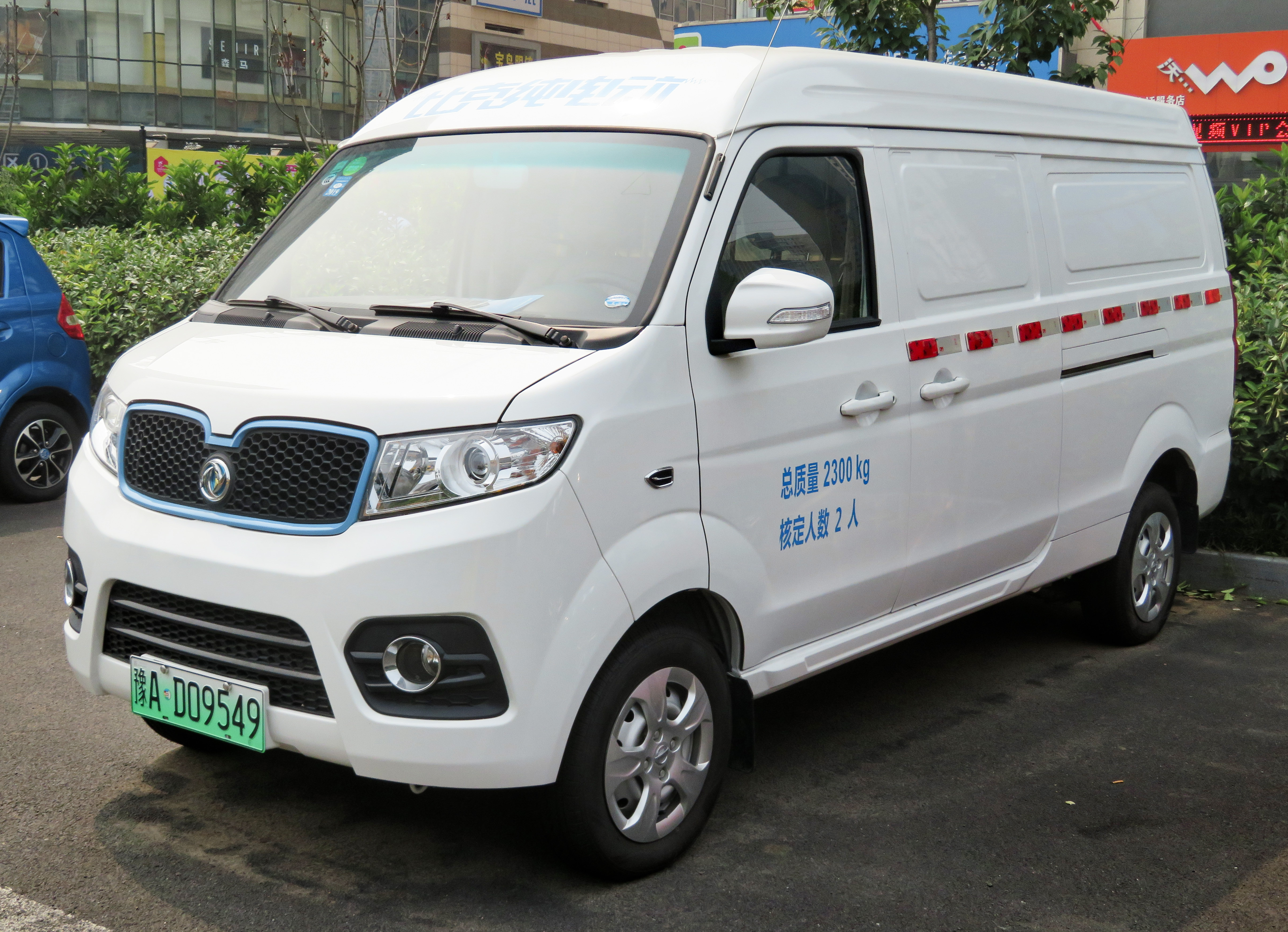
Dongfeng EM13 Electric panel van (front)

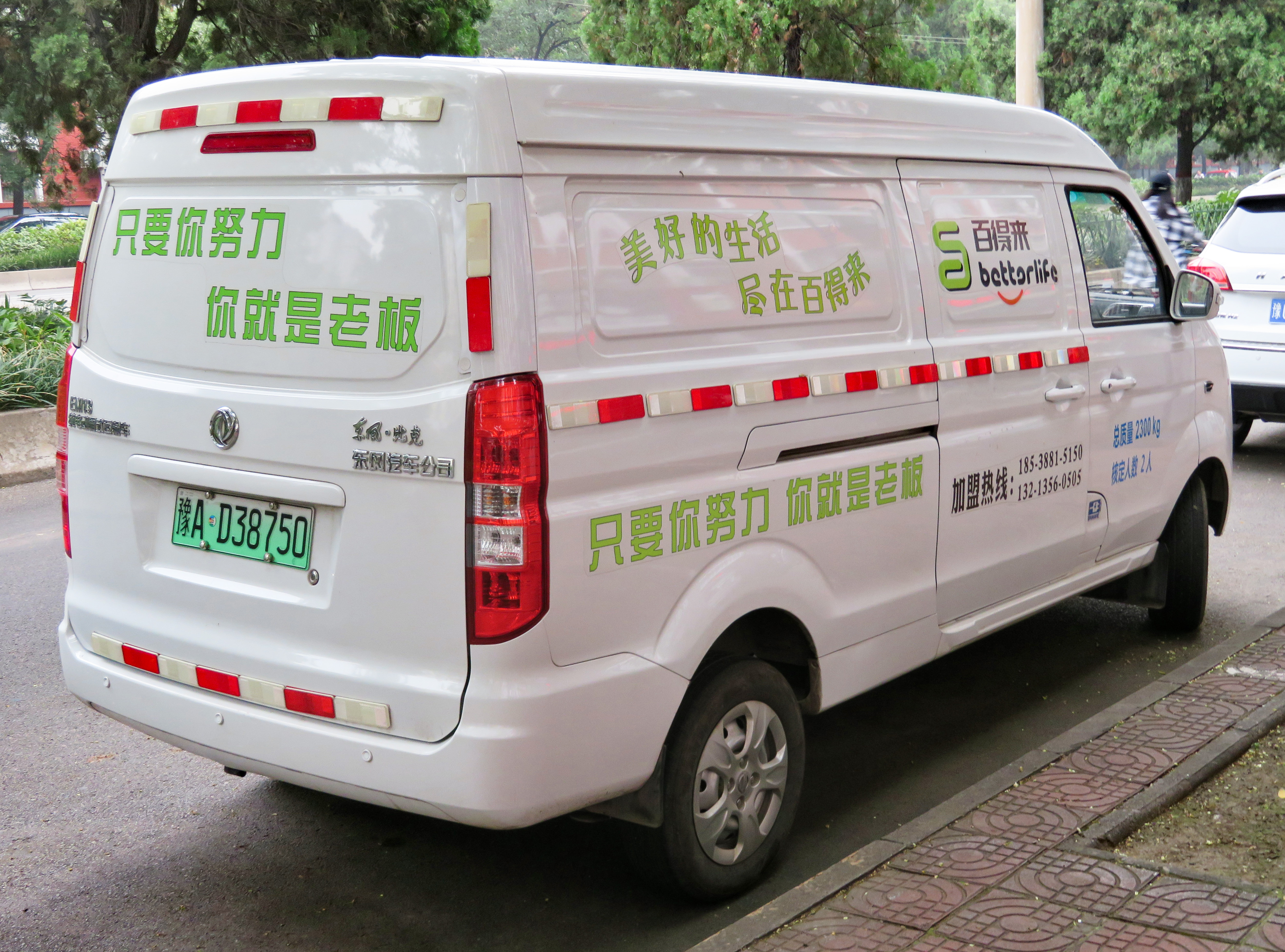
Dongfeng EM13 Electric panel van (rear)

== Farizon E5L Electric panel van ==
The Farizon E5L is a rebadged electric panel van by Geely under the Farizon brand sharing the X30L platform. The smaller Farizon E5 models are Gonow Way CL- based while the Farizon E5L models are rebadged Haise X30Ls. As of 2020, only the E5L remains to be available. The E5L features sliding side doors.

The E5L is powered by a rear positioned 60 kW motor developing 82Ps and 220Nm powering the rear wheels. The top speed is 90 km/h, and the battery is available as a 39.9 kWh battery by Guoxuan and a 41.86kWh battery by CATL with both batteries capable of a range of 280 km.

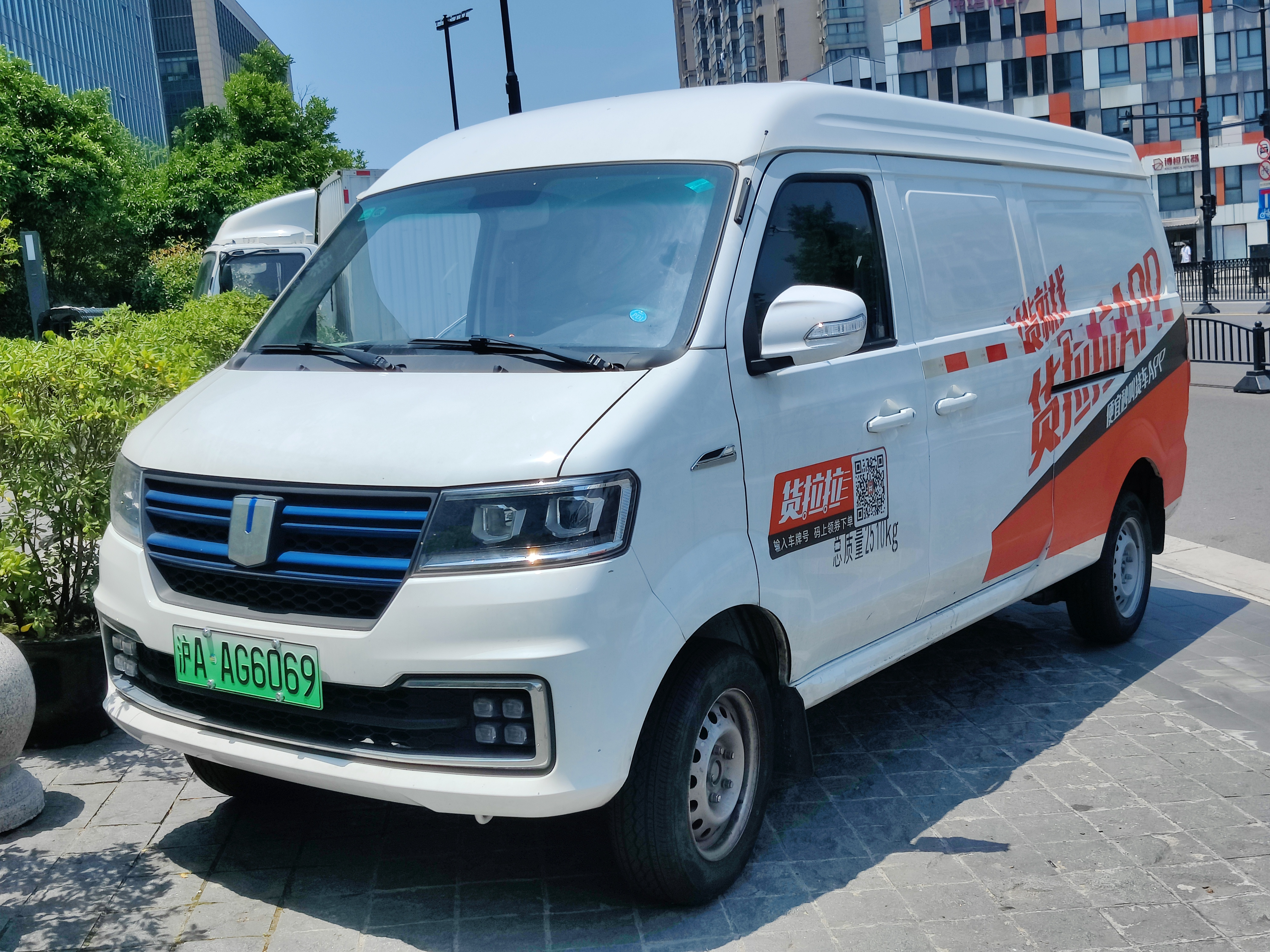
Farizon E5L facelift electric panel van

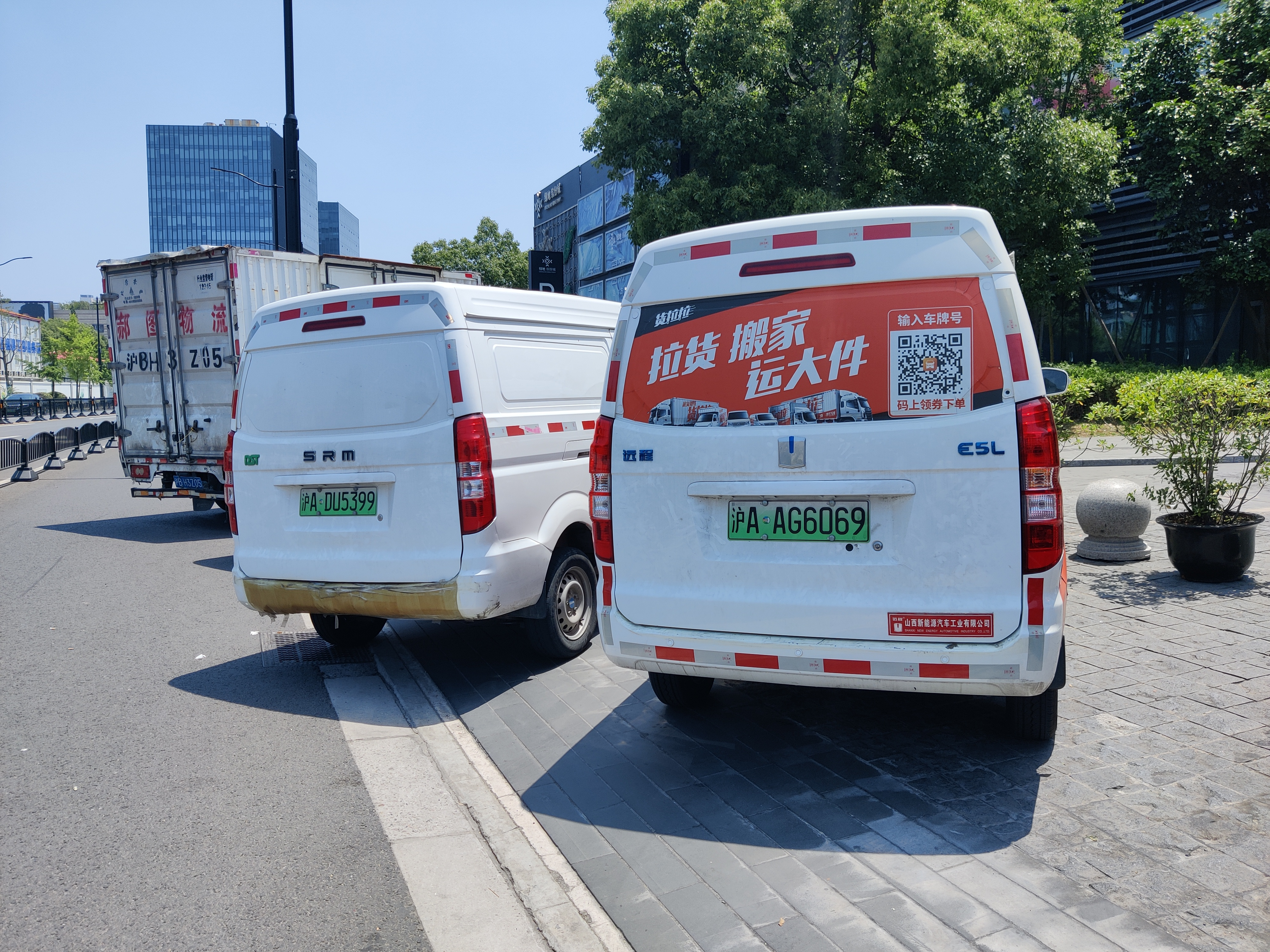
Farizon E5L facelift electric panel van and SRM electric panel van rear view

== Ankai T3 and Ankai Kuaileyun ==
The Ankai T3 and Ankai Kuaileyun (安凯快乐运) are rebadged electric panel van variants based on the Haise X30L by Ankai. The maximum power output of the Ankai Kuaileyun is 60 kW with a maximum torque of 220 N·m. Batteries are supplied by CATL and the maximum range on a full charge is 290 km.

== Esemka Bima ==
The Indonesian manufacturer, Esemka, rebadged the SRM Shineray X30LEV and sold as the Bima EV and the Jinbei T30 as the Bima 1.3 pickup. It debuted on the 2023 Indonesia International Motor Show.

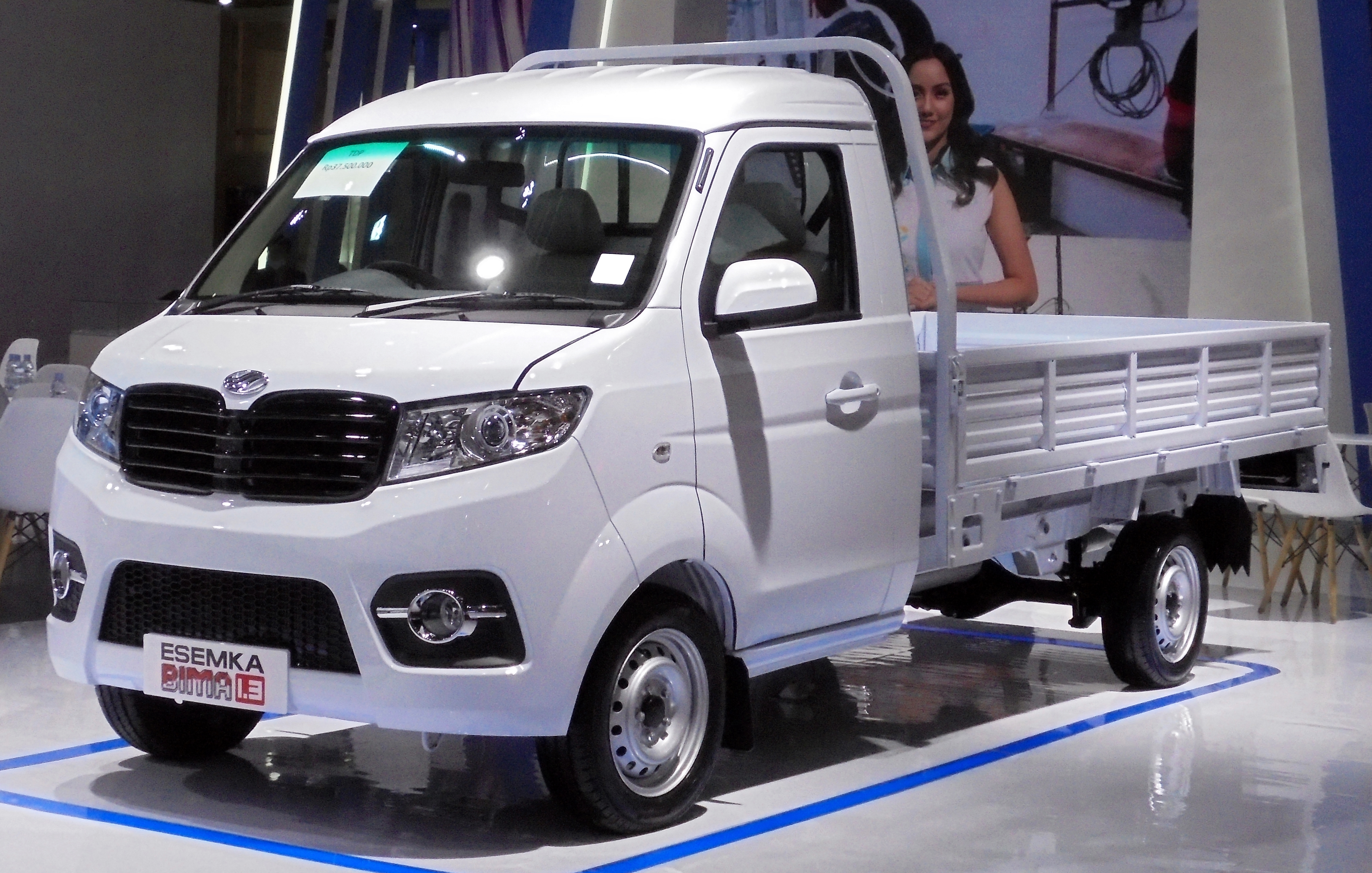
Esemka Bima 1.3 pickup
