= Bhim Singh =

Bhim Singh may refer to:

- Bhim Singh of Amber (died 1537), ruler of the kingdom of Amber
- Bhim Singh Rana (1707–1756), ruler of the princely state of Gohad
- Bhim Singh of Marwar (died 1803)
- Bhim Singh of Mewar (1768–1828), of Mewar Kingdom and the 1st Maharana of the Princely state of Udaipur
- Bhim Singh II (1909–1991), last ruling Maharaja of the princely state of Kotah
- Bhim Singh (politician) (born 1937), Indian politician, activist and author
- Bhim Singh (Bihar politician) (born 1962), Indian educationist and politician
- Bhim Singh (athlete) (born 1945), Indian former high jumper
- Bhim Singh (wrestler), Indian freestyle wrestler
- A. Bhimsingh or Bhim Singh, Indian filmmaker
- Bhimsingh Lenin or B. Lenin, Indian filmmaker

== See also ==
- Bhim (disambiguation)
