= Bema myja =

Scientific classification
- Kingdom: Animalia
- Phylum: Arthropoda
- Class: Insecta
- Order: Lepidoptera
- Family: Pyralidae
- Genus: Bema
- Species: B. myja

Binomial name
- Bema myja Dyar, 1914

Species of moth

Bema myja is a species of snout moth in the genus Bema. It was described by Harrison Gray Dyar Jr. in 1914 and is found in Panama.
