= Bhimadeva =

Bhimadeva may refer to:

- Bhimadeva Shahi, a king of the Hindu Shahi dynasty
- Bhima I, a king of the Chalukya (Solanki) dynasty of Gujarat
- Bhima II, a king of the Chalukya (Solanki) dynasty of Gujarat
- Bhima of Mahikavati, a prince of the Yadava dynasty of Devagiri; established a new capital at Mahim in present-day Mumbai
- Bhima, a legendary hero of India

== See also ==
- Bhima (disambiguation)
