= Bema (disambiguation) =

A bema is a ceremonial platform set up in an assembly.

Bema or BEMA may also refer to:

- Bema (moth), a genus of moth
- Bema, Lombardy, a town in the province of Sondrio, Italy
- The British Environment and Media Awards
- Oromë or Béma, a Vala in Tolkien's mythology
- Bema, an Ancient Greek unit of measurement
- The Business Equipment Manufacturers Association, historical name of the Information Technology Industry Council

== See also ==
- Białystok-osiedle Bema, a district of the city of Białystok in Poland
