= Bema neuricella =

Scientific classification
- Kingdom: Animalia
- Phylum: Arthropoda
- Clade: Pancrustacea
- Class: Insecta
- Order: Lepidoptera
- Family: Pyralidae
- Genus: Bema
- Species: B. neuricella

Binomial name
- Bema neuricella (Zeller, 1848)

Synonyms
- Ephestia neuricella Zeller, 1848

Species of moth

Bema neuricella is a species of snout moth in the genus Bema. It was described by Philipp Christoph Zeller in 1848, and is known from St. Thomas, Hispaniola, Cuba and the Bahamas. It is also found in North America, including Iowa and Florida.
