= Bima Hill =

Nigerian Tourist Centre

Bima Hill is a hill in Gombe State, Nigeria located in the Yamaltu/Deba Local Government area. It has a prominence of 404 m (1325 ft). Bima Hill is the fourth most elevated hill in Gombe State out of 23. It is also the first out of two in Yamaltu/Deba. By prominence, Bima Hill is the 80th in Nigeria, the second in Gombe and first in Yamaltu/Deba.

== Localities of Bima Hill ==
Shinga is a town in the Yamaltu/Deba area of Gombe State, Nigeria. It lies at an elevation of 425 m (1394 ft) between the Bima Hills and the left bank of the Gongola River. Shinga is situated 8 km (5 mi) north of the Bima Hills. Other nearby villages are:

- Kalo: 4.4 km (5 mi)
- Gwani: 6.9 km (4.3 mi)
- Gadam: 9.7 km (6 mi)
- Nahantsi: 11.1 km (6.9 mi)

== Geography ==
Bima Hill is located to the left bank of Gongola River with latitude 10.3997°N, 11.5331°E. with an elevation of about 764 m (2,507 ft).

Landmarks

Biryel Government House: 9 km (5.6 mi) southeast

Dadin Kowa Dam: 10 km (6.2 mi) southwest

Wade Hills: 11 km (6.8 mi) northeast

Deba Fulani: 18 km (11.2 mi) west

The relief is less than 300 m (984 ft) which rises above the surrounding land with the climate type of topical savanna.

The feature of the hill is the hypsographic type which is the study and mapping of Earth's topography above the sea level
