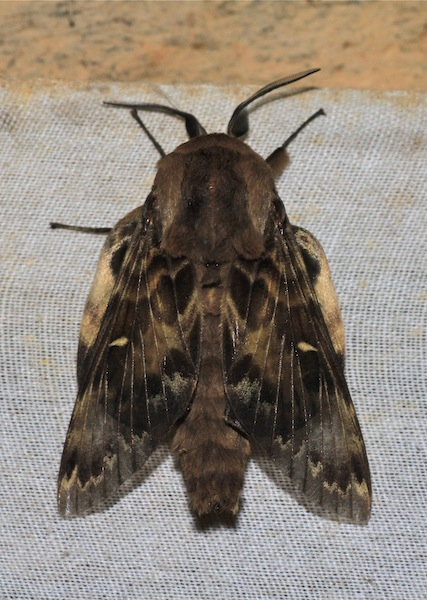
- Bhima borneana from Borneo

Scientific classification
- Domain: Eukaryota
- Kingdom: Animalia
- Phylum: Arthropoda
- Class: Insecta
- Order: Lepidoptera
- Family: Lasiocampidae
- Genus: Bhima; Moore, 1888

= Bhima (moth) =

Genus of moths

Bhima is a genus of moths in the family Lasiocampidae. The genus was first described by Frederic Moore in 1888.

== Species ==
- Bhima borneana Holloway, 1987
- Bhima eximia Oberthür, 1881
- Bhima idiota Graeser, 1888
- Bhima potanini Alphéraky, 1895
- Bhima rotundipennis de Joannis, 1930
- Bhima undulosa Walker, 1855
