= Bema (moth) =

Scientific classification
- Domain: Eukaryota
- Kingdom: Animalia
- Phylum: Arthropoda
- Class: Insecta
- Order: Lepidoptera
- Family: Pyralidae
- Subfamily: Phycitinae
- Genus: Bema; Dyar, 1914

Synonyms
- Relmis Dyar, 1914

Genus of moths

Bema is a genus of snout moths. It was described by Harrison Gray Dyar Jr. in 1914 and is known from Panama and St. Thomas.

== Species ==
- Bema myja Dyar, 1914
- Bema neuricella (Zeller, 1848)
- Bema ydda (Dyar, 1914)
