= Bhimsen, Kanpur =

Village in Uttar Pradesh, India

Bhimsen
- village
- Location in Uttar Pradesh, India
- Coordinates: 26°25′0″N 80°12′0″E
- Country: India
- State: Uttar Pradesh
- District: Kanpur

Government
  - Type: Gram Panchayat
  - Body: Bhimsen Gram Panchayat
- Elevation: 125 m (410 ft)

Population (2011)
  - Total: 7,359

Languages
  - Official: Hindi
- Time zone: UTC+5:30 (IST)
- Vehicle registration: UP-78
- Coastline: 0 kilometres (0 mi)

Bhimsen is a village in Kanpur district in the state of Uttar Pradesh, India.

== Demographics ==
Bhimsen village has population of 7359 of which 3903 are males while 3456 are females as per Population Census 2011. Bhimsen village has higher literacy rate compared to Uttar Pradesh. In 2011, literacy rate of Bhimsen village was 72.65% compared to 67.68% of Uttar Pradesh. In Rampur Bhimsen Male literacy stands at 79.82% while female literacy rate was 64.41%.

== Transport ==
It is well connected by rail and road. Bhimsen Junction railway station provides connections to Manikpur Sarhat, Kanpur and Jhansi.

== Geography ==
Bhimsen is located at 26°25′0″N 80°12′0″E. It has an average elevation of 125 meters (413 feet)
