= Centro de Eventos Bima =

Centro de Eventos Bima is a concert center located next to the Bima Oulet Mall in Bogotá, Colombia. The place has a capacity for 12 thousand people. The artists that have arisen are:

== Concerts ==
Artist	Date
Gustavo Cerati and Aterciopelados	June 7, 2003
Judas Priest	November 3, 2008
Pet Shop Boys	May 25, 2013
Luis Miguel	November 15, 2013
Ringo Starr and His All Star Band	March 6, 2015
Ed Sheeran and Manuél Mendrano	April 19, 2015
