= Bhim Chand =

Bhim Chand may refer to:

- Bhim Chand (Kahlur) (born 1651), Rajput King of Bilaspur state
- Bhim Chand (soldier) (born 1905), Indian Army officer
