= Jinbei Haixing X30 =

Chinese automobile

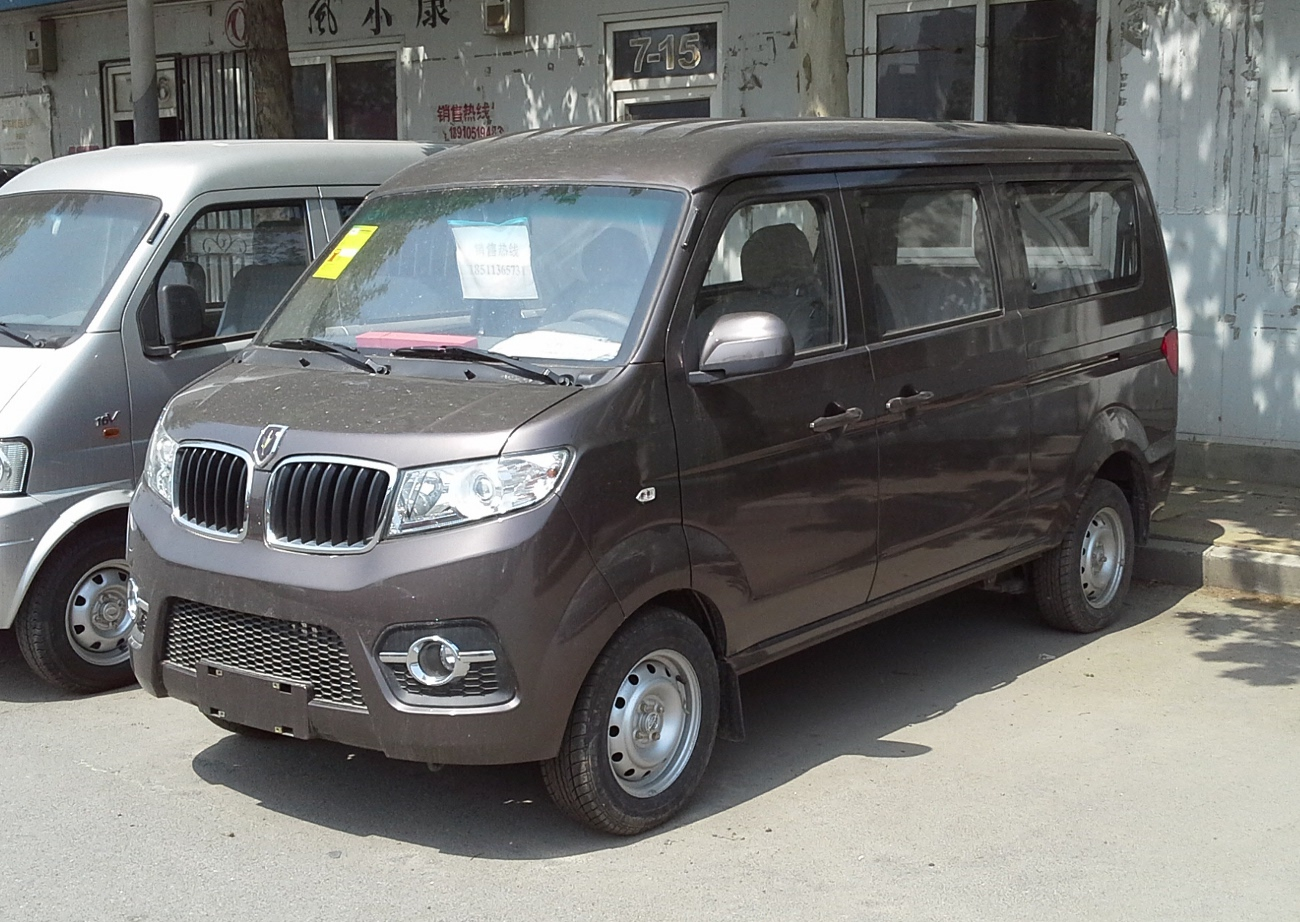
- Jinbei Haixing X30

Overview
- Manufacturer: Brilliance Auto
- Also called: Jinbei X30; Jinbei Small Haise X30; SRM Shineray Haoyun No.2 (panel van); SRM Shineray Small Haise EV; Jinbei/Shineray T30 (pickup)
- Production: 2013–present
- Model years: 2013–present

Body and chassis
- Class: Minivan
- Body style: 5-door minivan
- Layout: Mid-engine, rear-wheel-drive
- Related: Jinbei Haise X30L; SRM Jinhaishi M

Powertrain
- Engine: 1.3 L I4 (petrol)
- Transmission: 5-speed manual

Dimensions
- Wheelbase: 2,700 mm (106.3 in)
- Length: 4,200 mm (165.4 in)
- Width: 1,695 mm (66.7 in)
- Height: 1,930 mm (76.0 in)

The Jinbei Haixing X30 is a 8-seater minivan produced by Chinese car manufacturer Brilliance Auto under the Jinbei brand.

== Overview ==
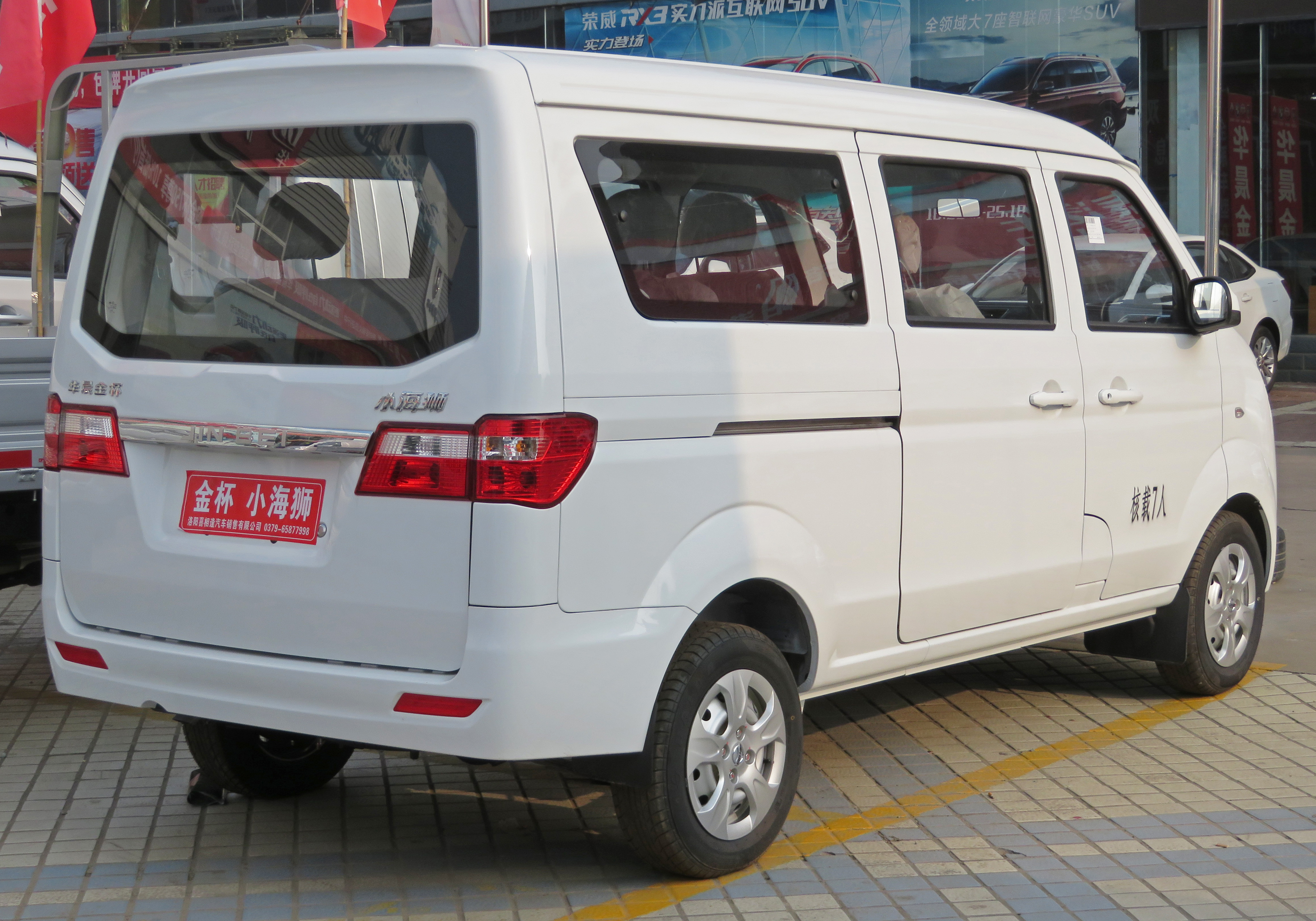
Rear view of the Small Haise

The Jinbei Haixing X30 was released by Brilliance Auto in August, 2013. Built by Brilliance Xinyuan Chongqing Auto (华晨鑫源), the Chongqing branch of Brilliance Auto, the Jinbei X30, originally known as Haixing X30, was developed as the flagship in the Haixing commercial van lineup.

When launched in the market in August 2013, the Jinbei Haixing X30 was originally sold as the Jinbei Small Haise X30, despite not having any real connection with the Toyota-Hiace-based Shenyang-made Jinbei Haise vans. Prices of the Jinbei X30 ranges from 35,000 yuan to 46,800 yuan.
