= Haise =

Haise may refer to:

== People ==
- Franck Haise (born 1971), French football player and manager
- Fred Haise (born 1933), American astronaut
- Lars Haise (born 1989), German politician

== Vehicles ==
- Jinbei Haise, Chinese automobile produced by Jinbei
- Jinbei Haise X30L, Chinese automobile produced by Jinbei
- Jinbei Grand Haise, Chinese automobile produced by Jinbei
