= Jinbei Grand Haise =

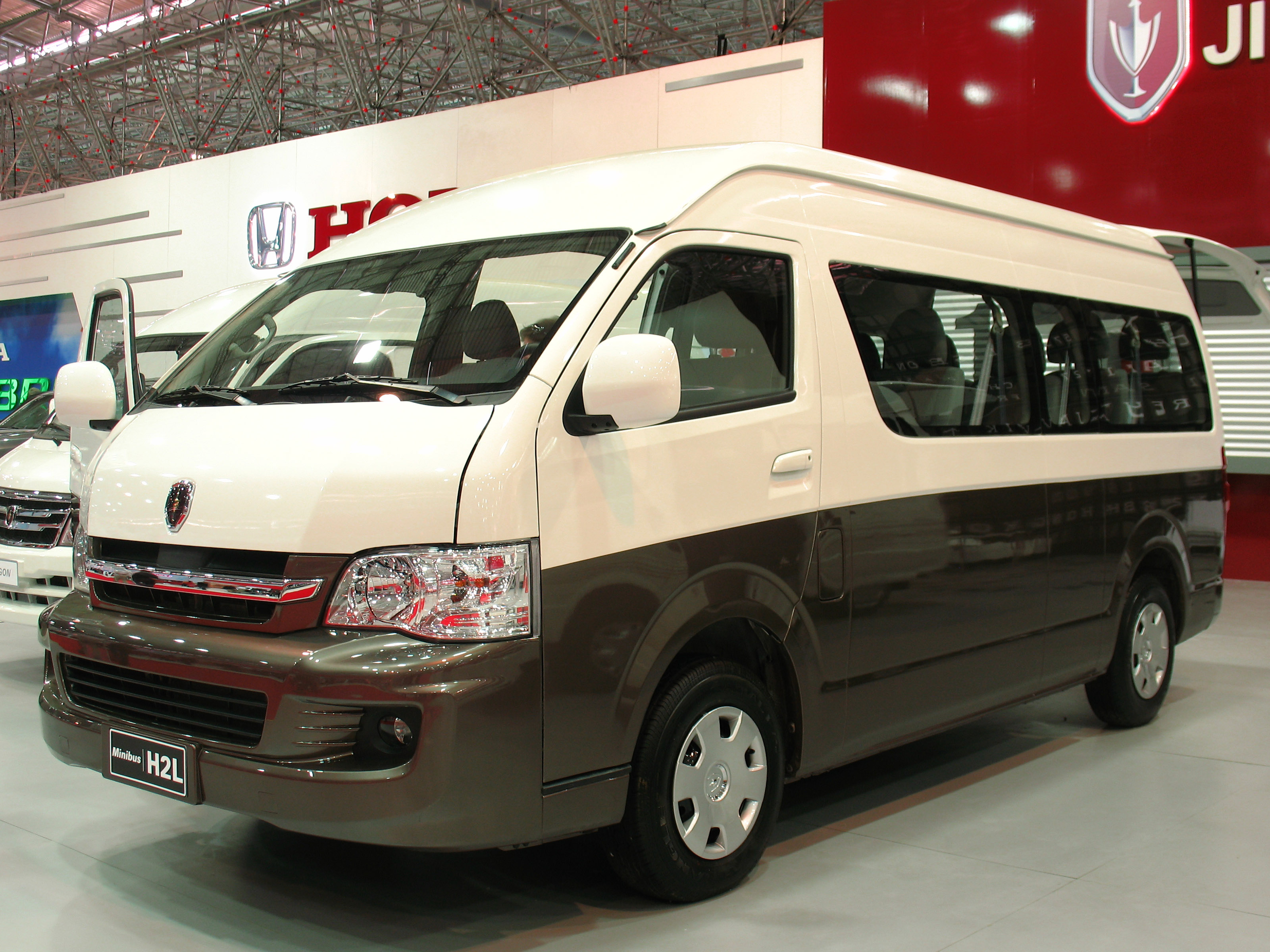

Overview
- Also called: Jinbei New Haise; Jinbei H2; Jinbei H2L; Toyota HiAce
- Production: 2010–present
- Assembly: China: Anhui

Body and chassis
- Body style: 3-door van/minibus; 4-door van/minibus; 5-door van/minibus
- Layout: Front-engine, rear-wheel-drive / four-wheel drive
- Related: Jinbei Haise

Powertrain
- Engine: 2.4 L 4RB2 I4; 2.5 L DK4B diesel I4 (H6)
- Transmission: 4-speed automatic 5-speed manual

Dimensions
- Wheelbase: W: 2,570 mm (101.2 in); L: 3,110 mm (122.4 in)
- Length: W: 4,880 mm (192.1 in); L: 5,420 mm (213.4 in)
- Width: 1,880 mm (74.0 in)
- Height: 2,285 mm (90.0 in)

The Jinbei Grand Haise or Jinbei New Haise (金杯大海狮) is a series of light commercial van produced by the Chinese automobile manufacturer Jinbei based on the same platform as the smaller Jinbei Haise vans. First launched in 2010, the Jinbei Grand Haise has since been available in a wide range of body configurations, including a minivan/MPV, minibus, panel van, crew van, and an ambulance. Short wheelbase versions are named Jinbei Grand Haise W or Jinbei H2 while long wheelbase versions are named Jinbei Grand Haise L or Jinbei H2L.

== Overview ==
The Jinbei Grand Haise W or Jinbei H2 was released by Jinbei on March 23, 2012, with the Jinbei Grand Haise L or Jinbei H2L models being added shortly after. The Jinbei Grand Haise W provides up to 12 seating positions, compared with 14 seats on the Jinbei Grand Haise L. The Jinbei Grand Haise W and Jinbei Grand Haise L models share all essential body parts as well as styling features with only the size being different. A cheaper model based on the Grand Haise W called the Jinbei New Haise was added later featuring a restyled front bumper.

Engine options of the Jinbei Grand Haise include a 2.4 liter petrol engine and a 2.5 liter diesel engine mated to a 5-speed manual transmission. With the 2.5 liter engine producing 115hp and 280N·m of torque.

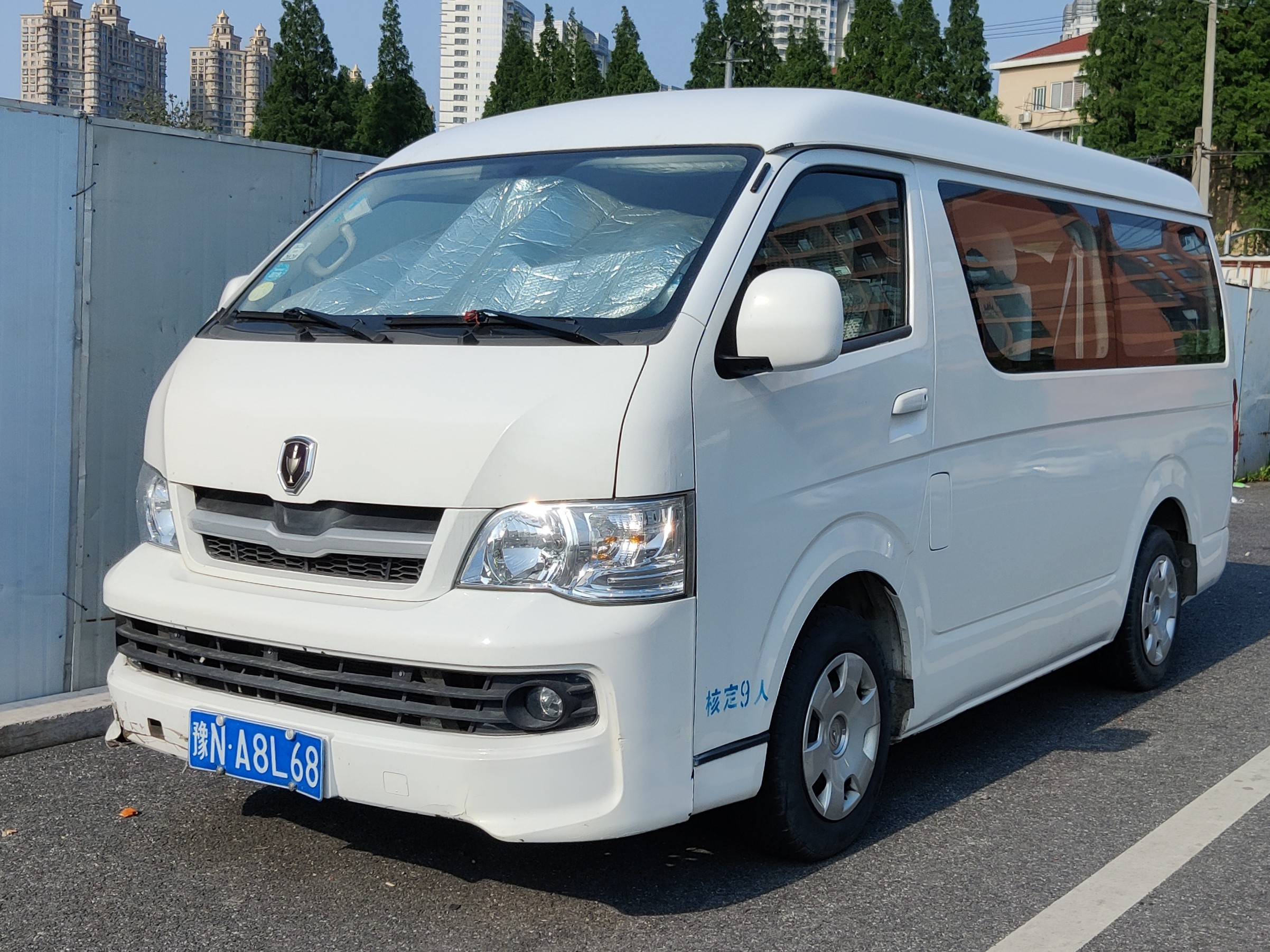
Jinbei New Haise front.

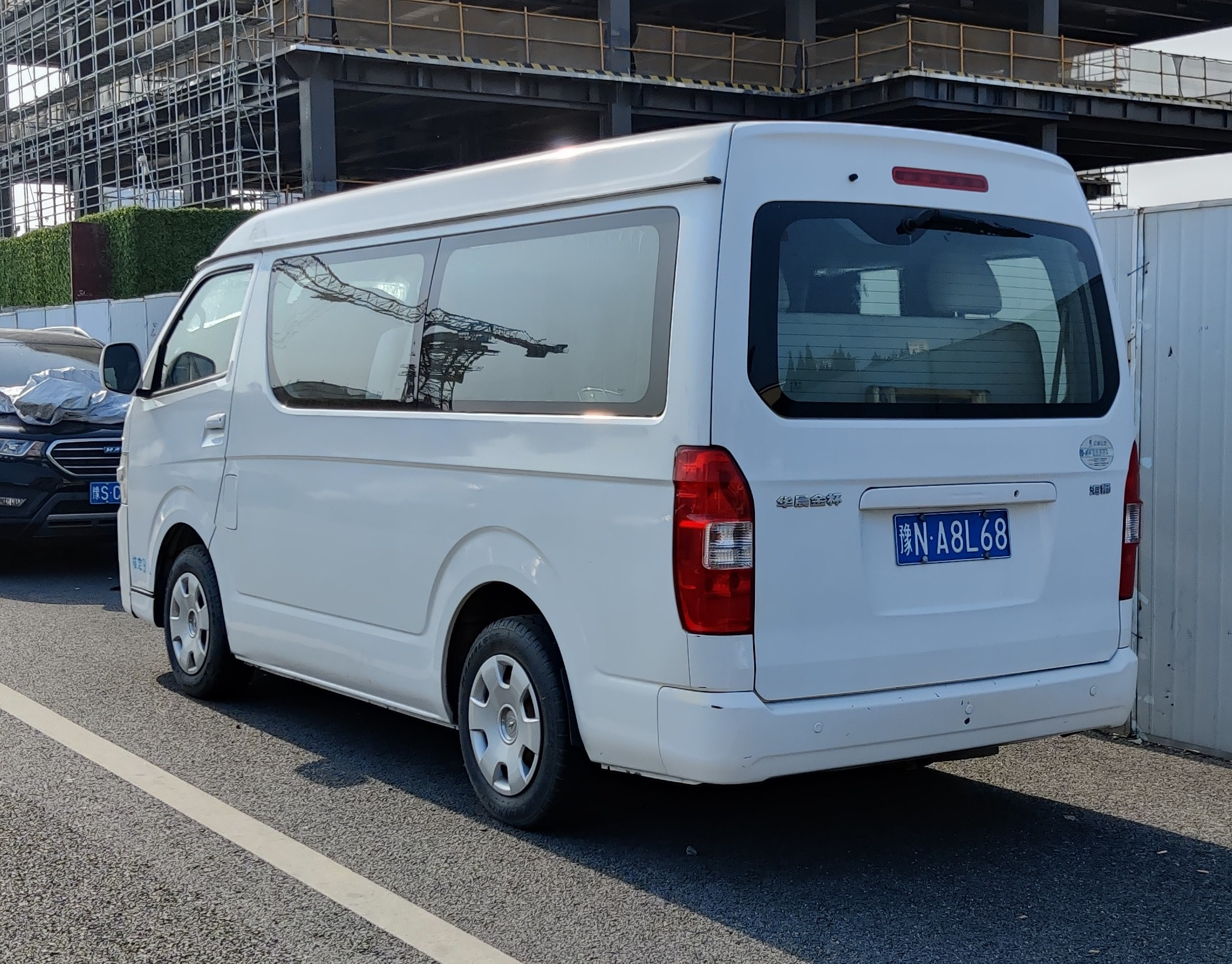
Jinbei New Haise rear.

== Controversies ==
The designs of the Jinbei Grand Haise models are controversial as they heavily resemble the fifth generation Toyota HiAce (H200) with similar body styles and overall vehicle dimensions despite only having the license to produce the H100 models. The Jinbei Grand Haise are among the various Chinese vans from domestic brands that chose to replicate the Toyota HiAce H200 vans with only minor styling differences. Other brands include government owned manufacturers including Rely and Foton.

== See also ==
Chinese-made Toyota HiAce clones

- Foton View by Foton
- Rely H series by Rely of Chery
- King Long Kaige by King Long
- Higer H5C by Higer
- Joylong A-series by Joylong
- Kaicene Zunxing by Kaicene of Changan Automobile
