= Kaicene Zunxing =

Kaicene Zunxing (长安凯程-尊行)
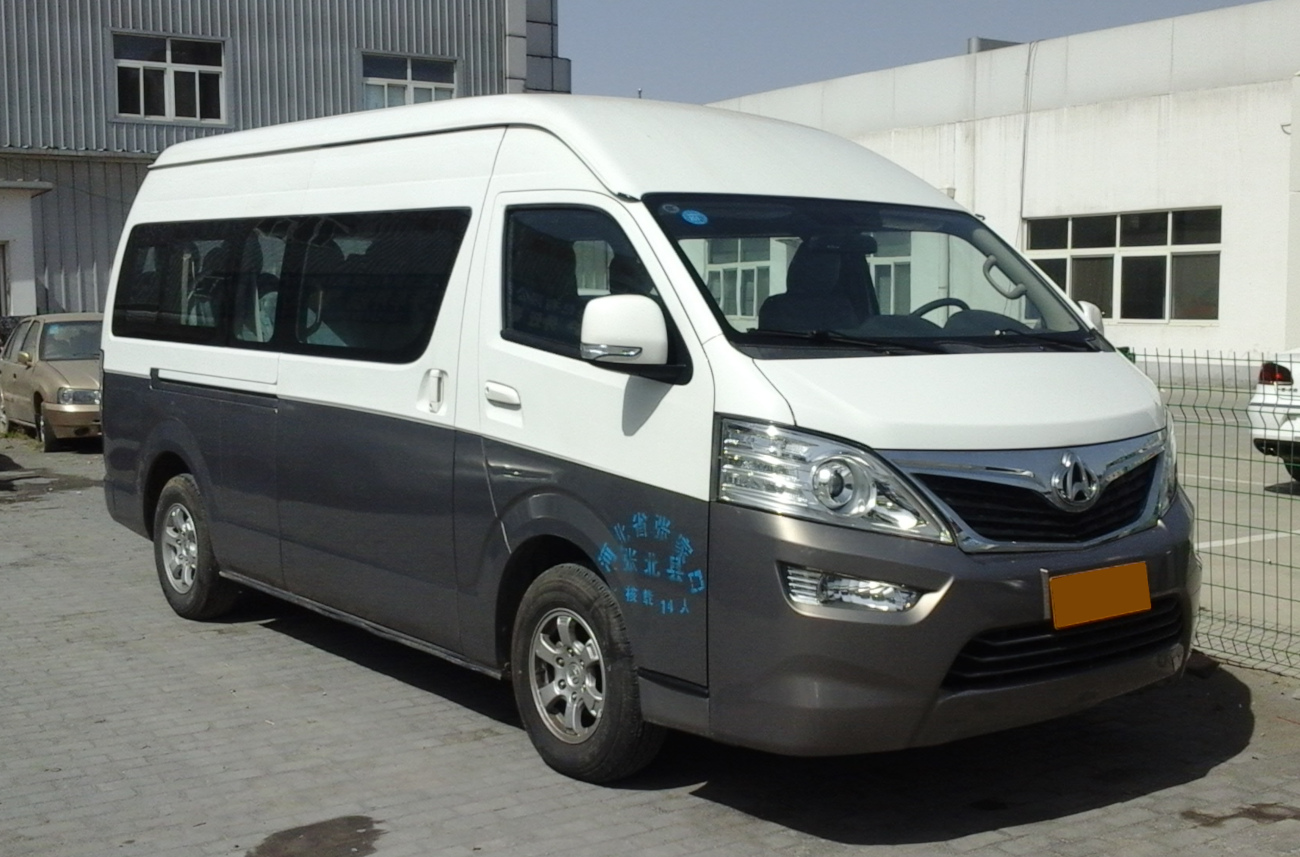

Overview
- Also called: Chana Zunxing
- Production: 2013–2016

Body and chassis
- Body style: 5-door van/minibus
- Layout: Front-engine, rear-wheel-drive

Powertrain
- Engine: 2.7 L "3TZ" DOHC VVT-i I4
- Transmission: 5-speed manual

Dimensions
- Wheelbase: 3,110 mm (122.4 in)
- Length: 5,495 mm (216.3 in)
- Width: 1,880 mm (74.0 in)
- Height: 2,280 mm (89.8 in)

The Kaicene Zunxing is a series of light commercial van produced by the Chinese automobile manufacturer Changan Automobile under the Kaicene brand, a commercial vehicle brand by Changan Automobile.

== Overview ==
The Kaicene Zunxing or originally Chana Zunxing was released by Changan Auto on October 23, 2013, with prices between 159,800 yuan and 209,800 yuan.

Power of the Kaicene Zunxing comes from a 2.7 liter DOHC VVT-i engine producing 163hp (120kW) at 4600-5000rpm and 256N·m of torque at 3200rpm.

== Controversies ==
The design of the Kaicene Zunxing is controversial as it heavily resemble the fifth generation Toyota HiAce (H200) with similar body styles and overall vehicle dimensions. The Rely H3 and Rely H5 are among the various Chinese vans from domestic brands that chose to replicate the Toyota HiAce H200 vans with only minor styling differences. Other brands include government owned manufacturers including Rely, Jinbei and Foton.
