= Jinbei Haise =

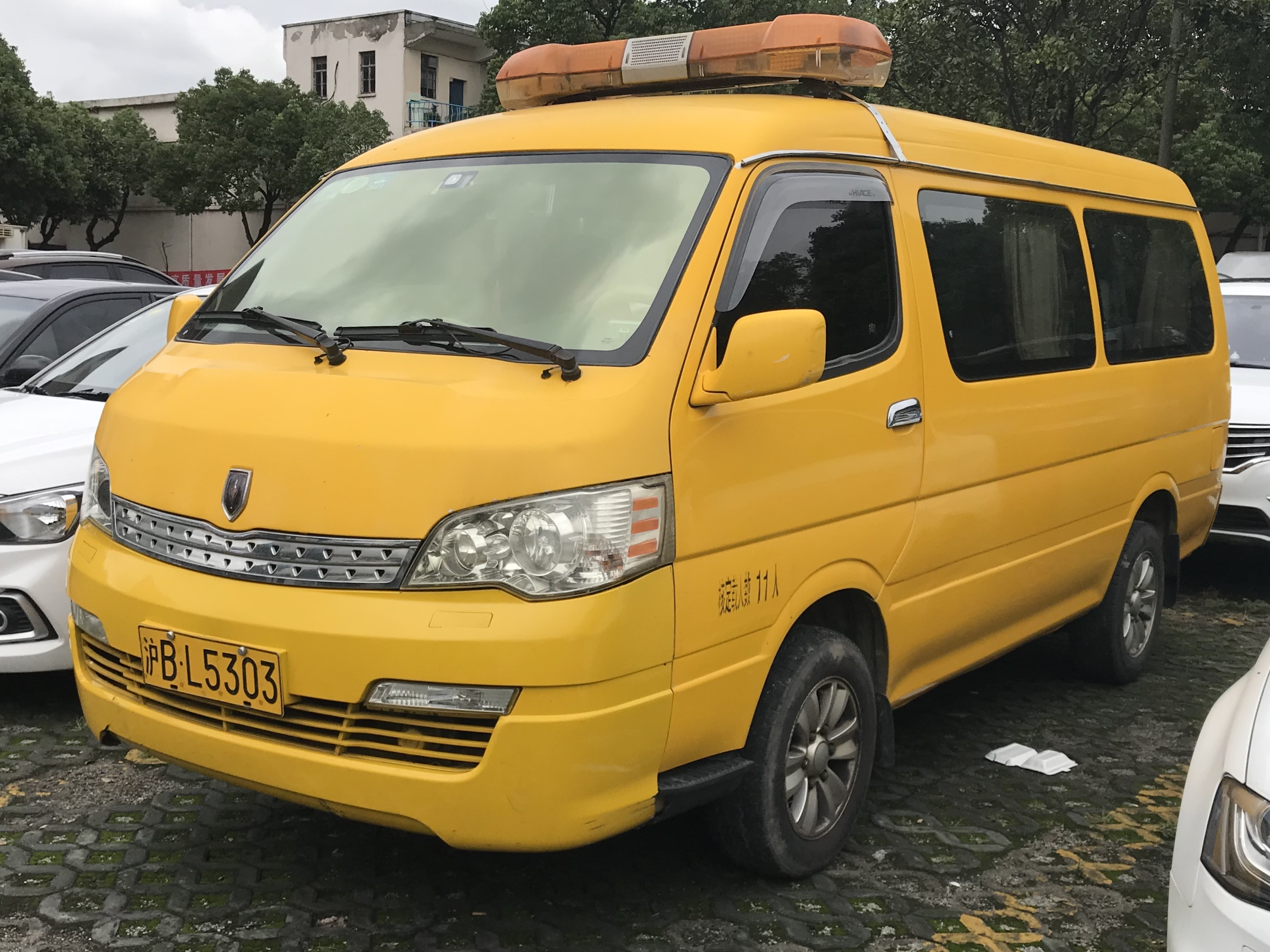

Overview
- Manufacturer: Jinbei
- Also called: Pars Khodro Haise (Iran); Pyeonghwa Samcheonri (North Korea; 2005–present); Jinbei Topic (Brazil)
- Production: 1991–present 2015–present (Pars Khodro)

Body and chassis
- Class: Light commercial vehicle; Mid-size van
- Body style: van, minibus

The Jinbei Haise (金杯海狮) is a 4-door mid-size van produced by Chinese automaker Jinbei since 1991. The Jinbei Haise started out as a licensed rebadged Toyota HiAce with the first Jinbei Haise based on the fourth generation Toyota HiAce.

== Jinbei Haise I (1991–2001) ==
On November 3, 1991, the first CKD assembled Jinbei Haise (金杯海狮) was assembled. The van was based on the prefacelift version of the fourth generation Toyota HiAce, and featured Jin Bei in block letters up front.

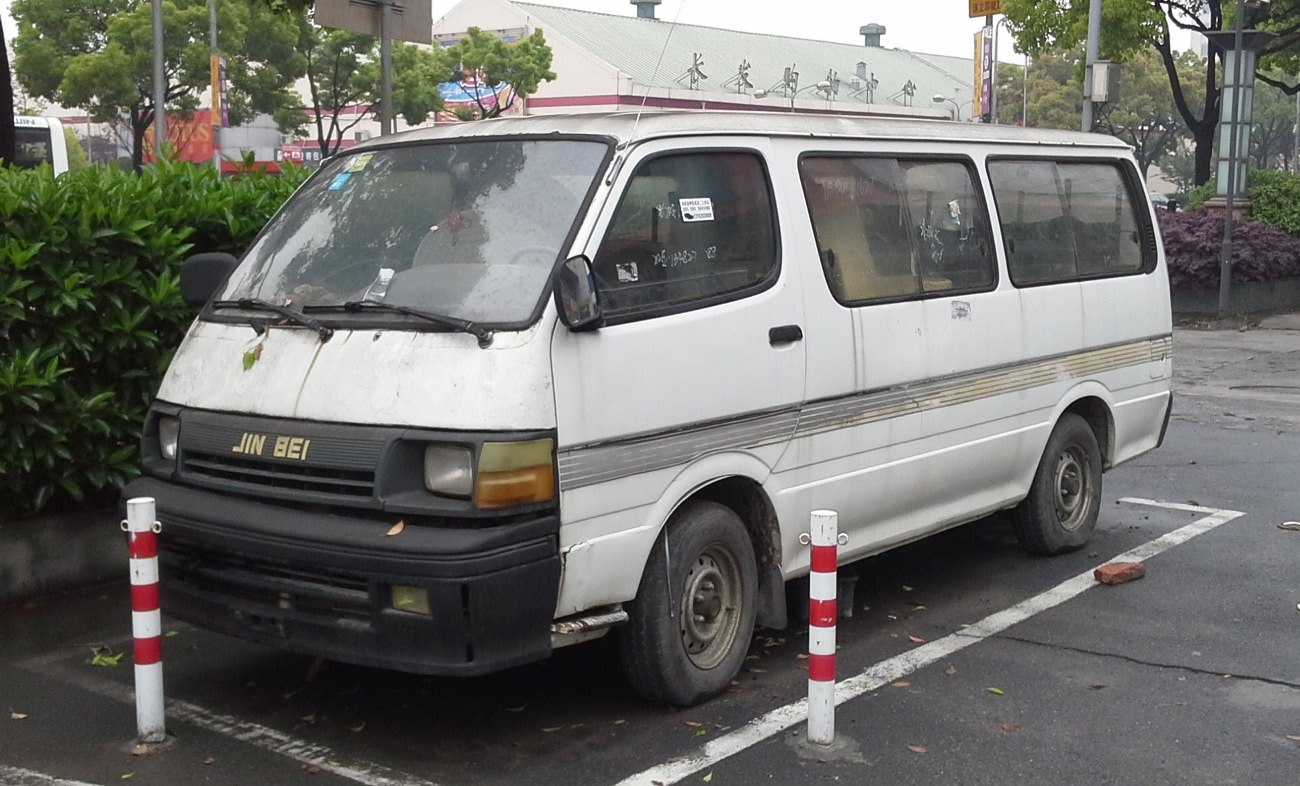
Jinbei Haise I

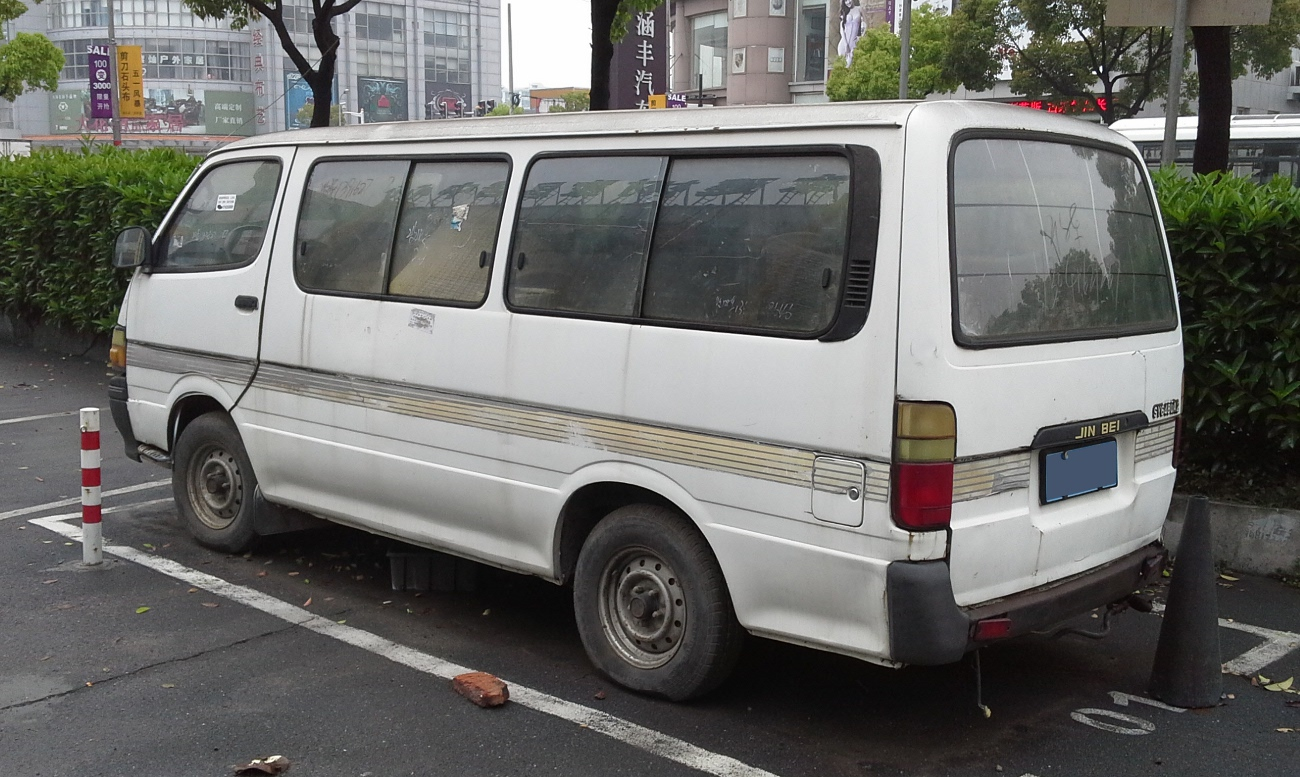
Jinbei Haise I

== Jinbei Haise II (1999–2006) ==
The second generation Jinbei Haise is still a rebadged Toyota HiAce, but with the facelifted front fascia from the HiAce. Rear end remains the same.

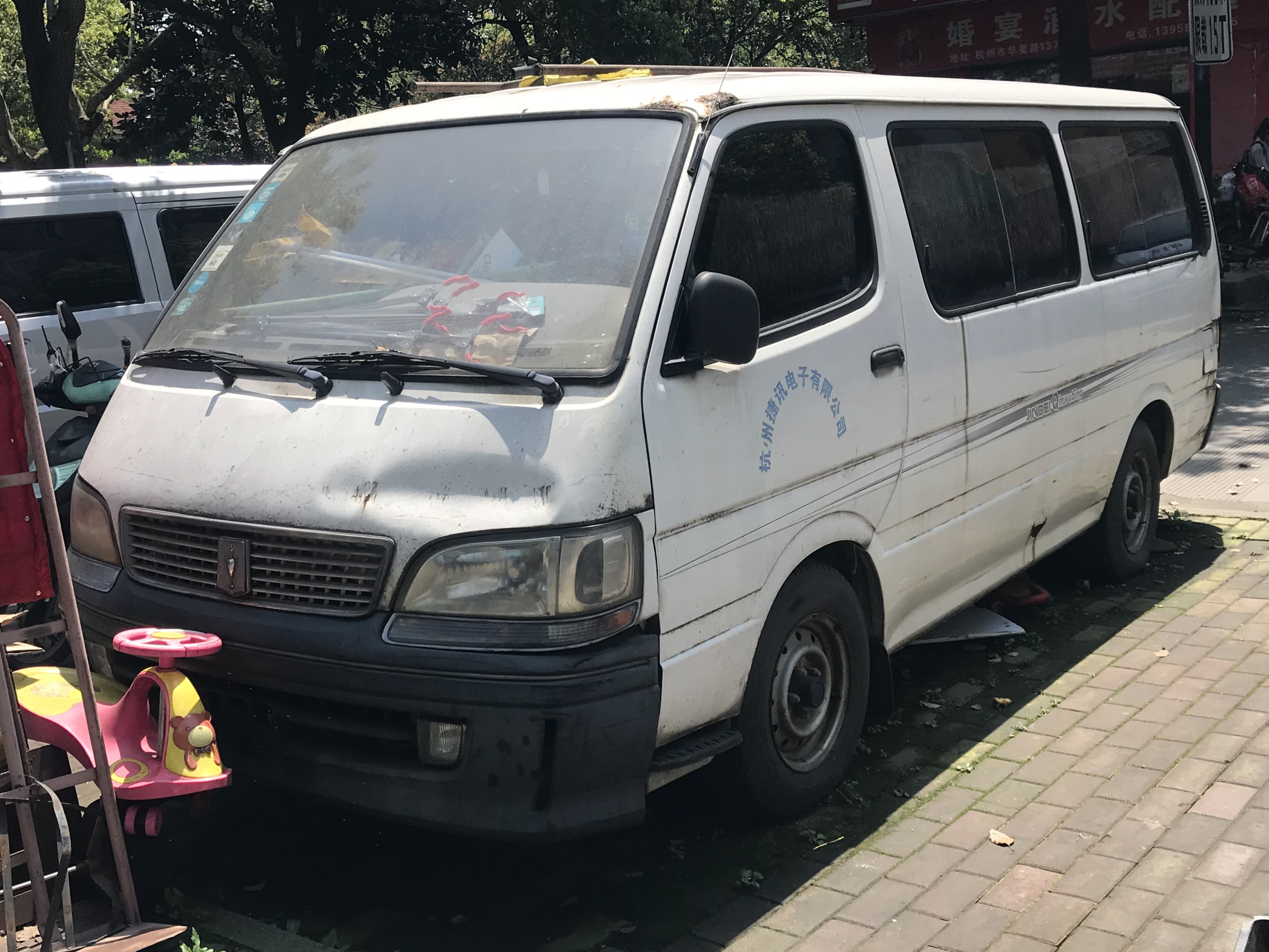
Jinbei Haise II

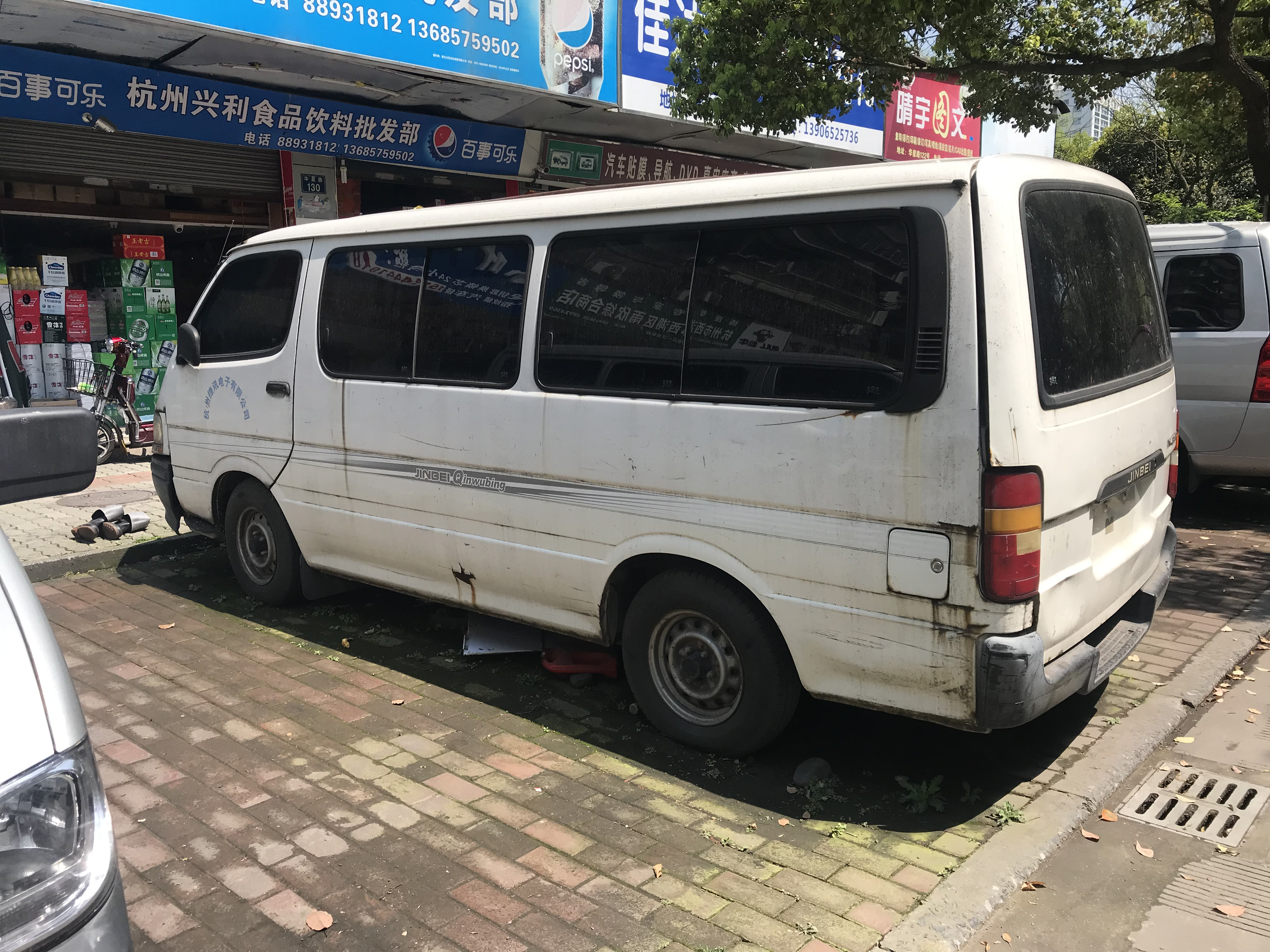
Jinbei Haise II

== Jinbei Haise III (2002–2006) ==
Just like previous generations, the third generation Jinbei Haise is still a rebadged updated Toyota HiAce MK4. The 10,000th Jinbei Haise was produced in 1997, and on July 17, 1999, the 200,000th Jinbei Haise was produced. By the end of 2002, the annual sales of Jinbei Haise has passed 65,000.

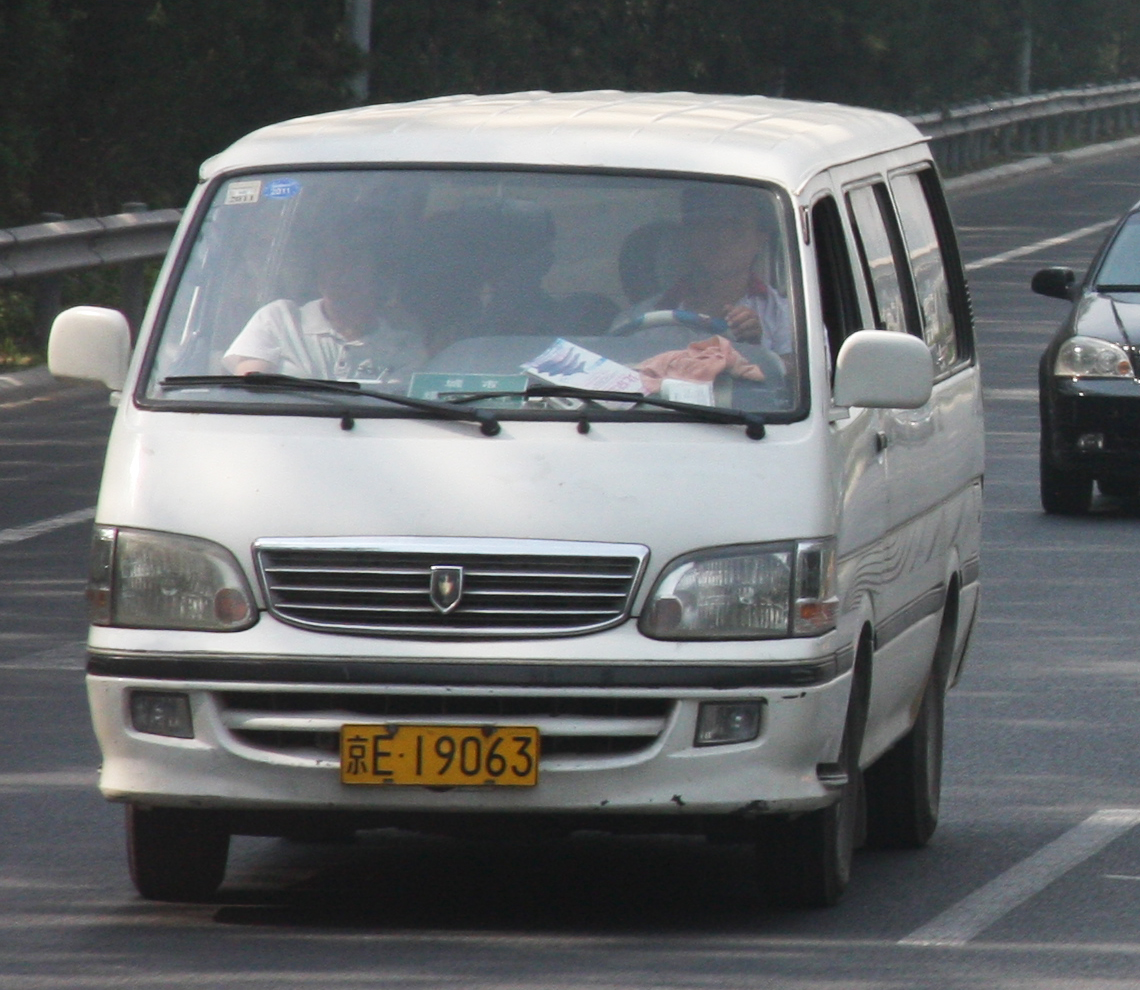
Jinbei Haise III

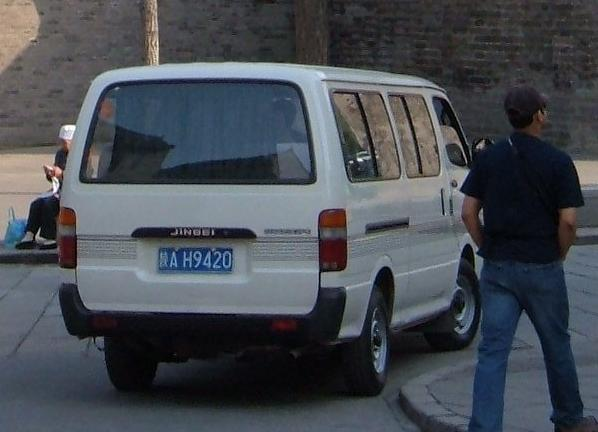
Jinbei Haise III

== Jinbei Haise IV (2002–2011) ==
The Jinbei Haise IV at launch features a completely redesigned front fascia and updated tail lamps while underneath the Haise is still a fourth generation Toyota HiAce. On October 27, 2010, Brilliance Jinbei rolled out the 1 millionth Haise. On the same day, more upmarket models based on the same platform as the Jinbei Haise resembling the fifth-gen Toyota Hiace (H200) went on sale, named Grand Haise or H2 in foreign markets.

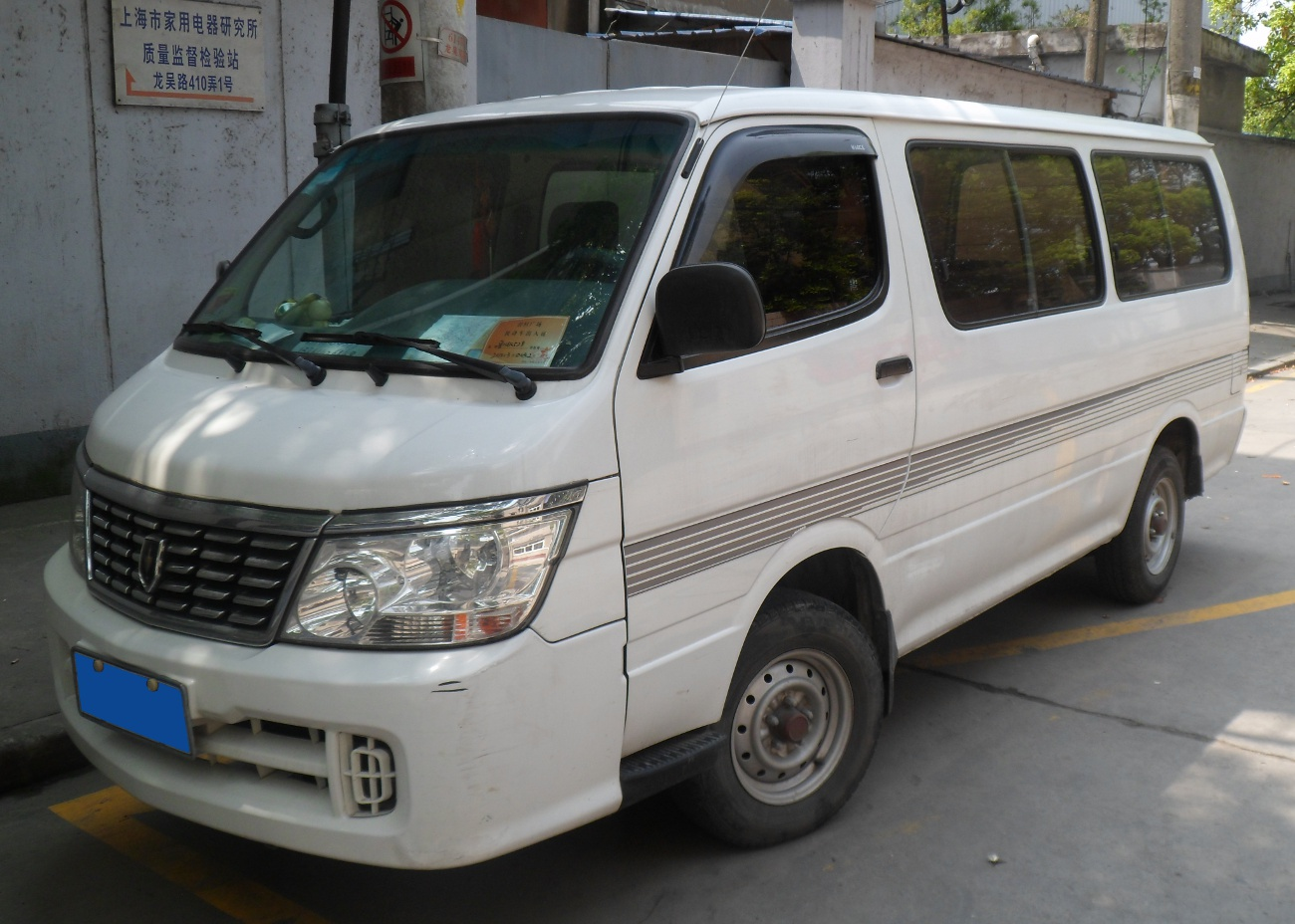
Jinbei Haise IV

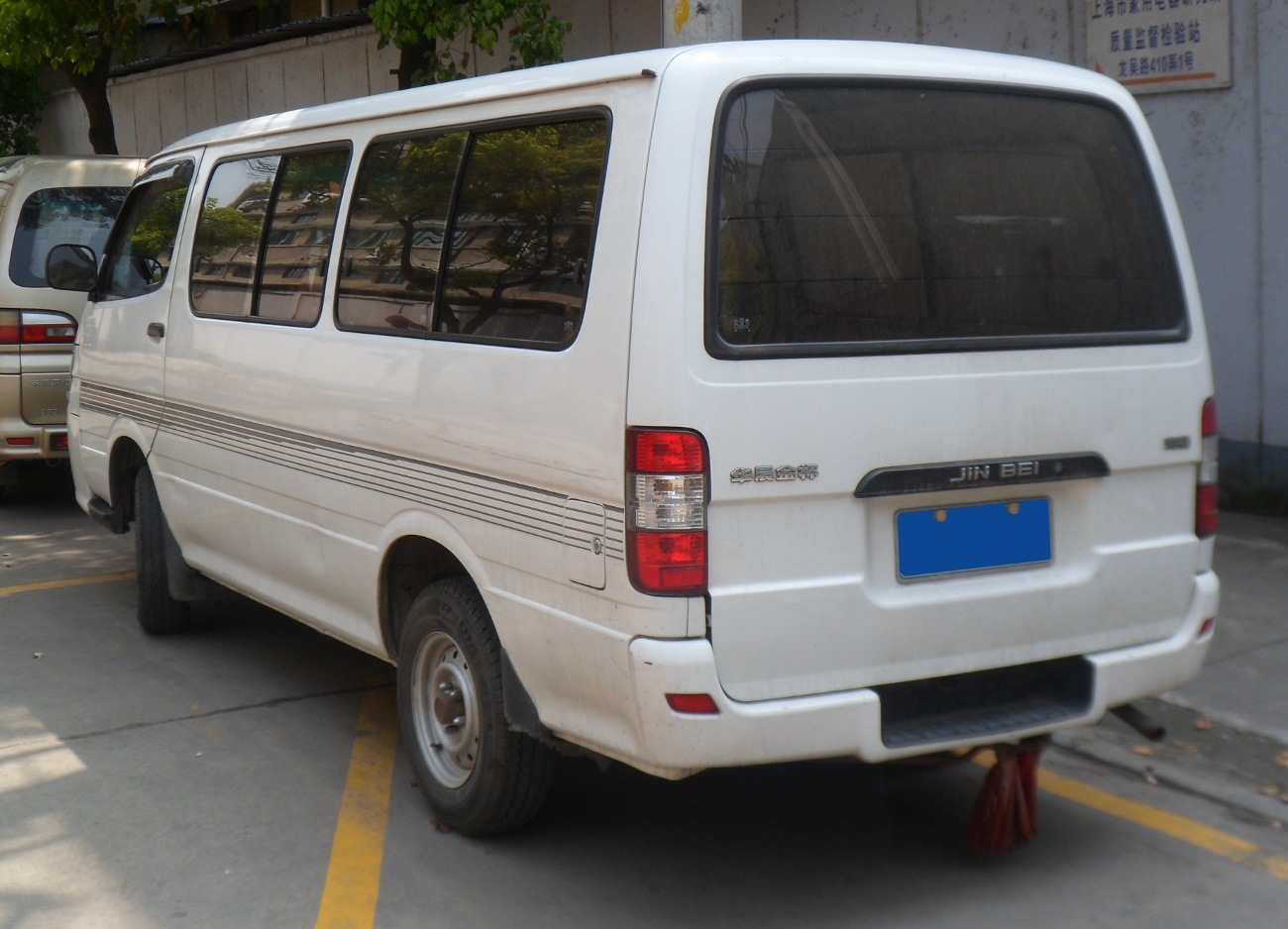
Jinbei Haise IV

== Jinbei Haise V (2006–present) ==
The fifth generation Jinbei Haise is essentially an extensive facelift of the Toyota HiAce based fourth generation Haise, and while the fifth generation on sale, the fourth generation vans were sold alongside as a lower trim option. The Jinbei Haise V features a redesigned rear end and updated headlamp and grille trim insert.

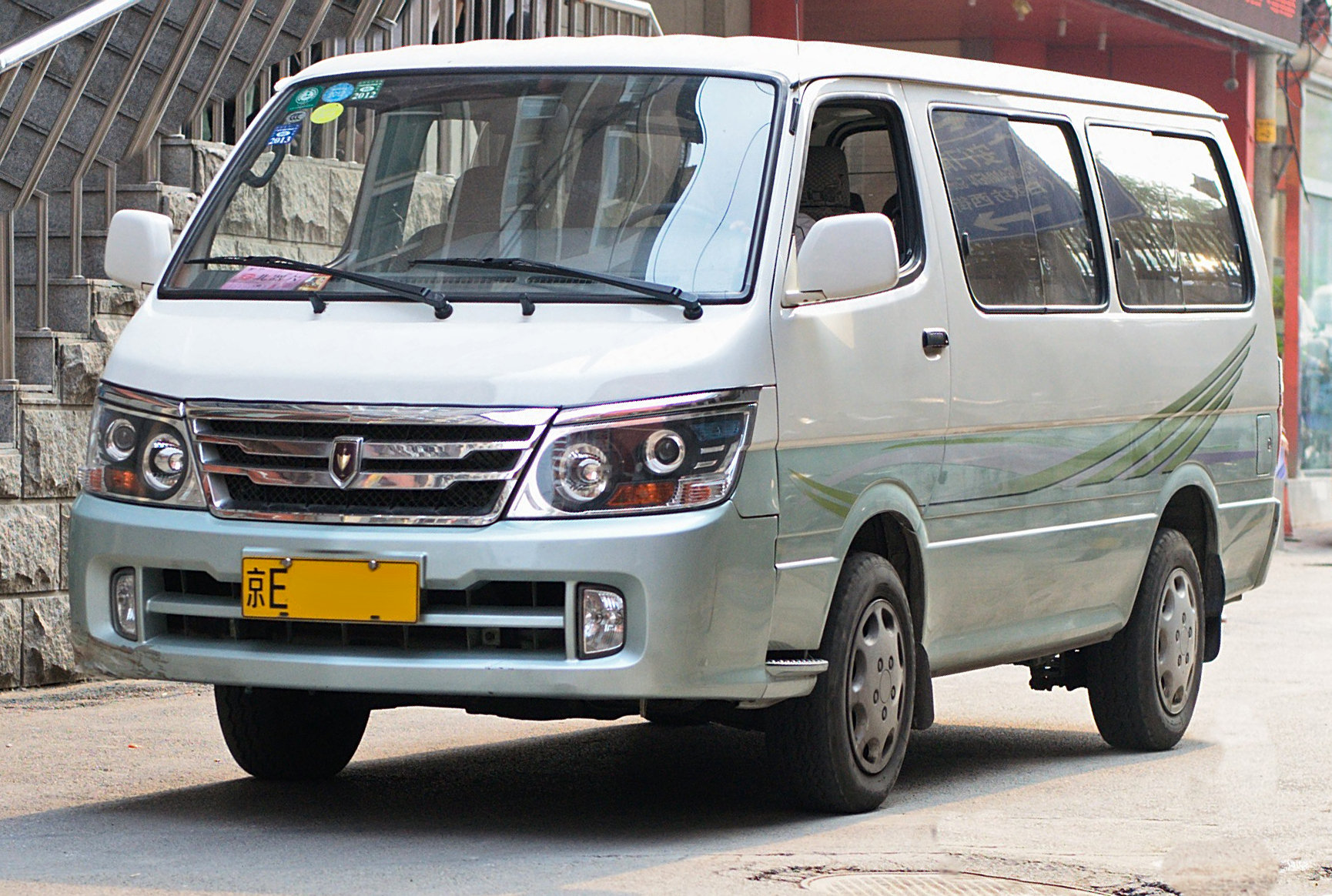
Jinbei Haise V

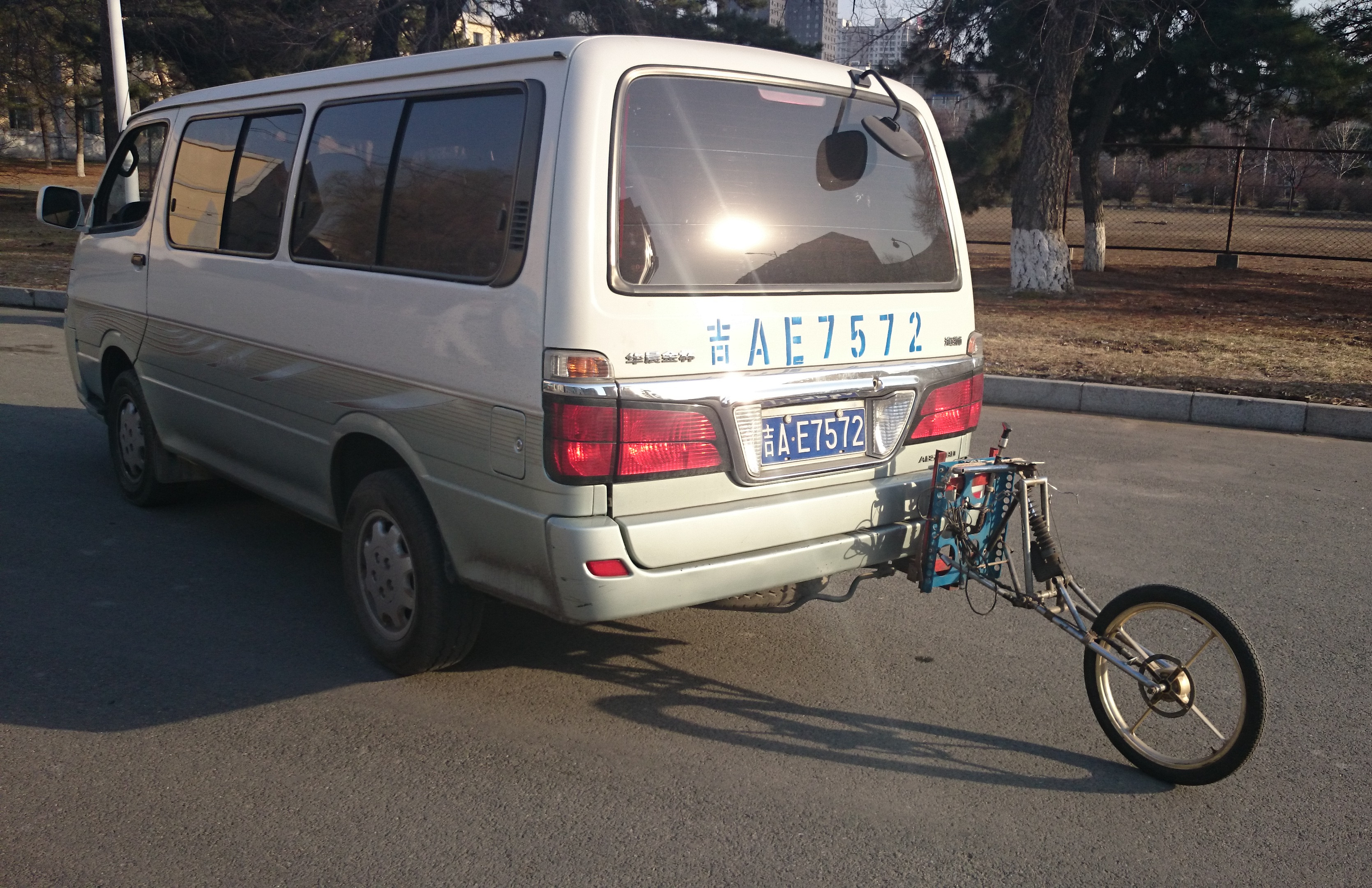
Jinbei Haise V

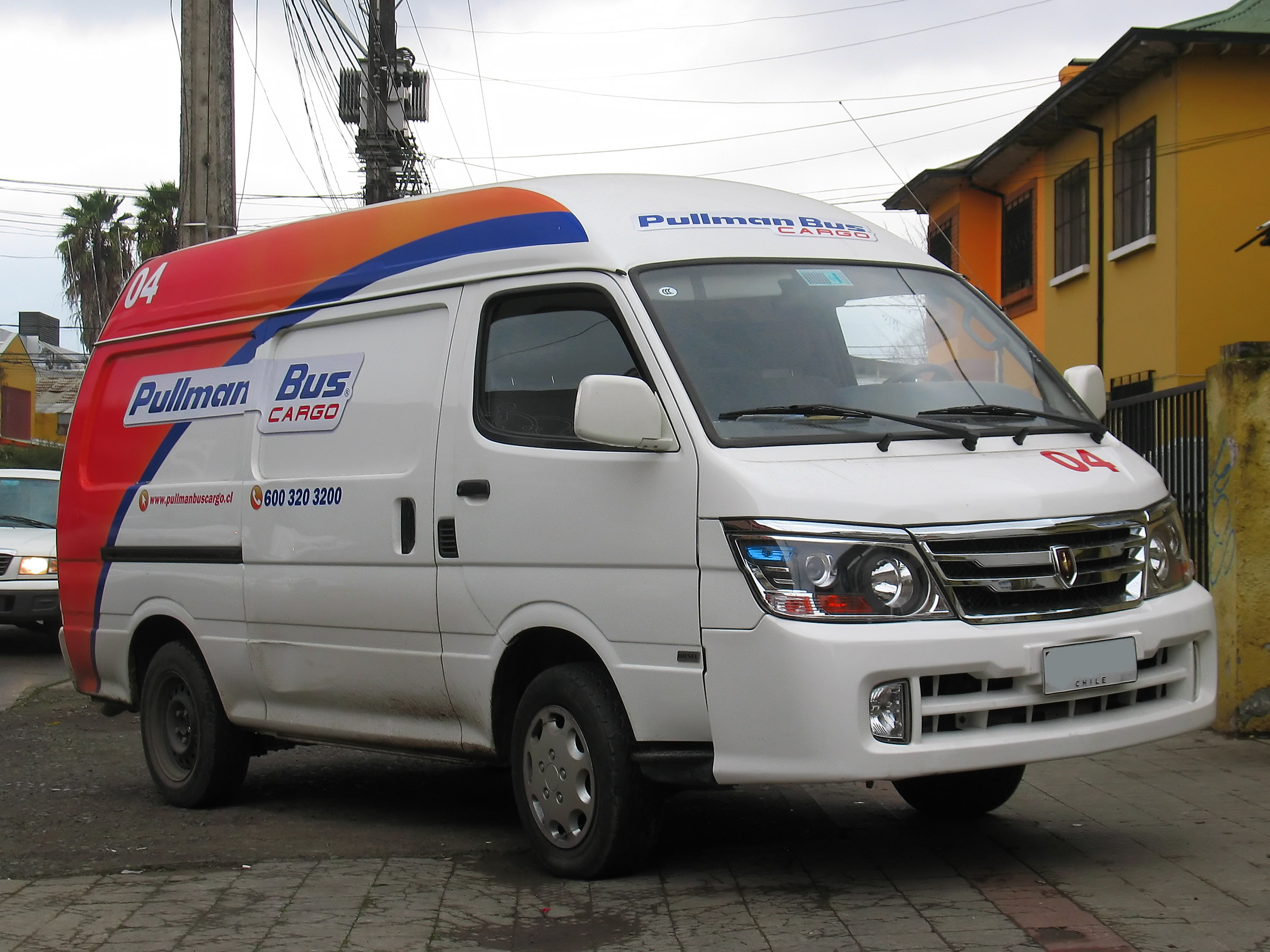
Jinbei Haise V 2.4d Cargo 2013 in Chile

== Jinbei Haise VI (2008–2013) ==
On September 23, 2008, the sixth generation Jinbei Haise was launched, and the 800,000th Jinbei Haise was also produced at the same time. Just like the previous Haise generations, the fifth generation was sold alongside as a more affordable option. The sixth generation Jinbei Haise, still essentially being an extensive facelift of the previous generations, featured a completely redesigned front fascia and rear end. This version is no longer part of Jinbei's model range due to its discontinuation on the official website.

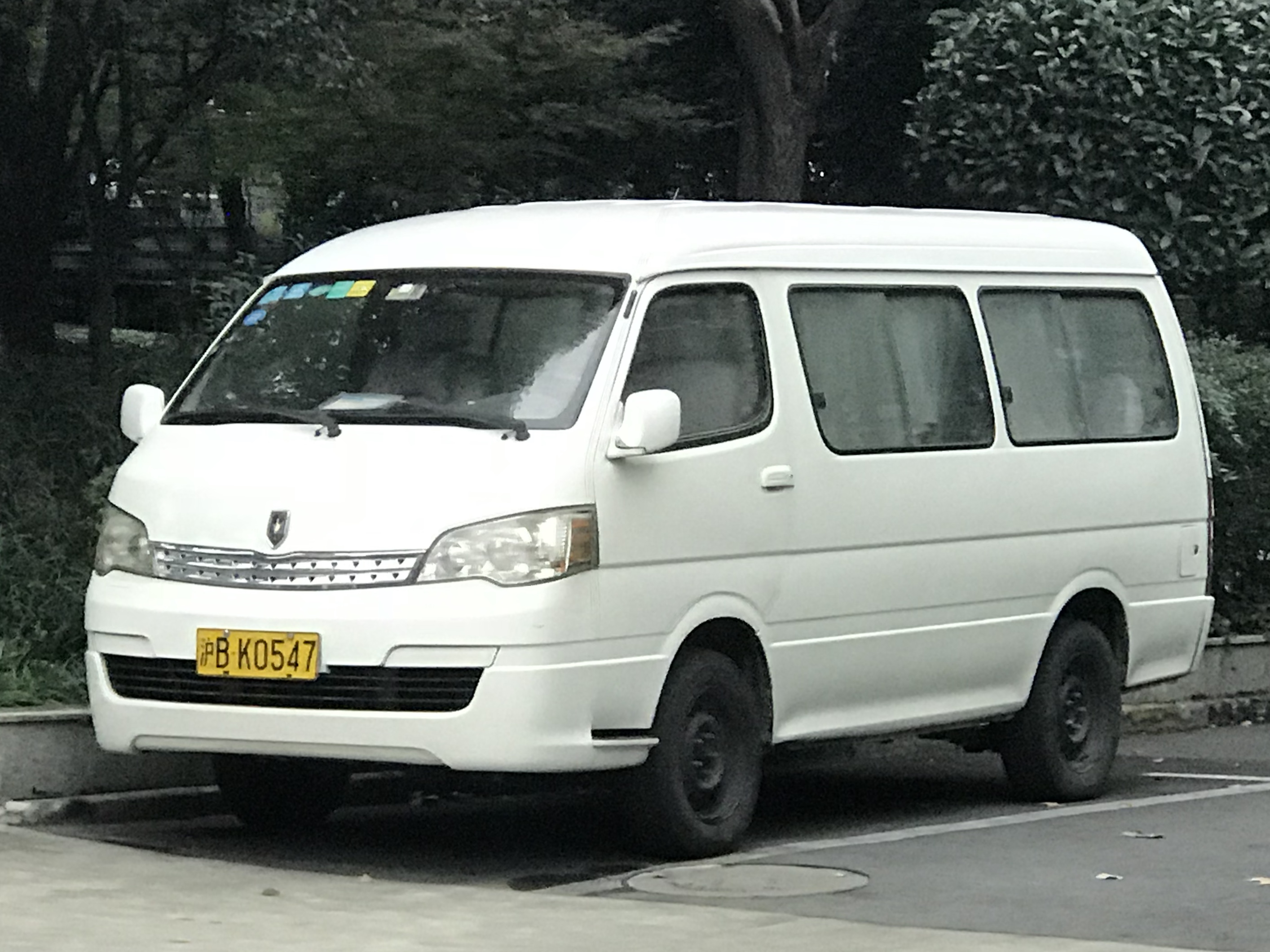
Jinbei Haise VI

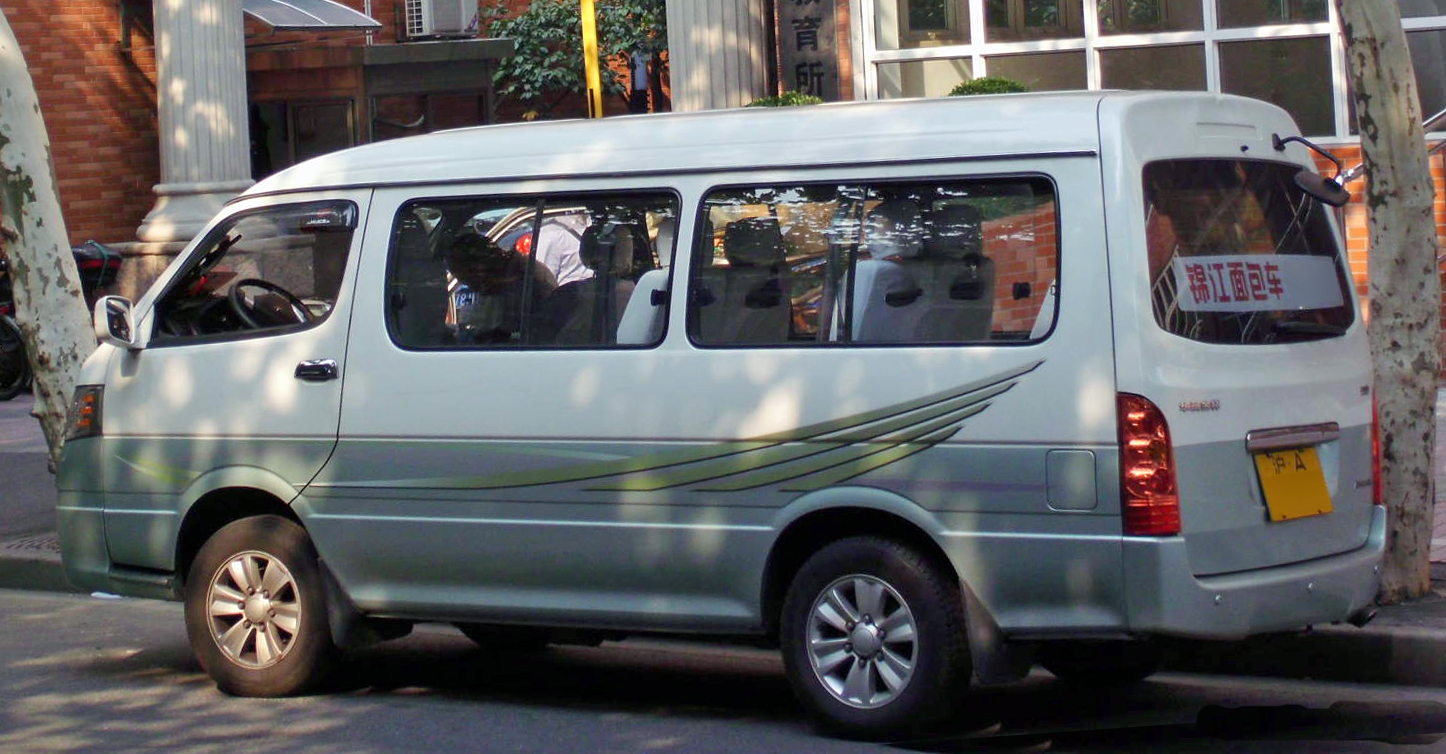
Jinbei Haise VI minibus

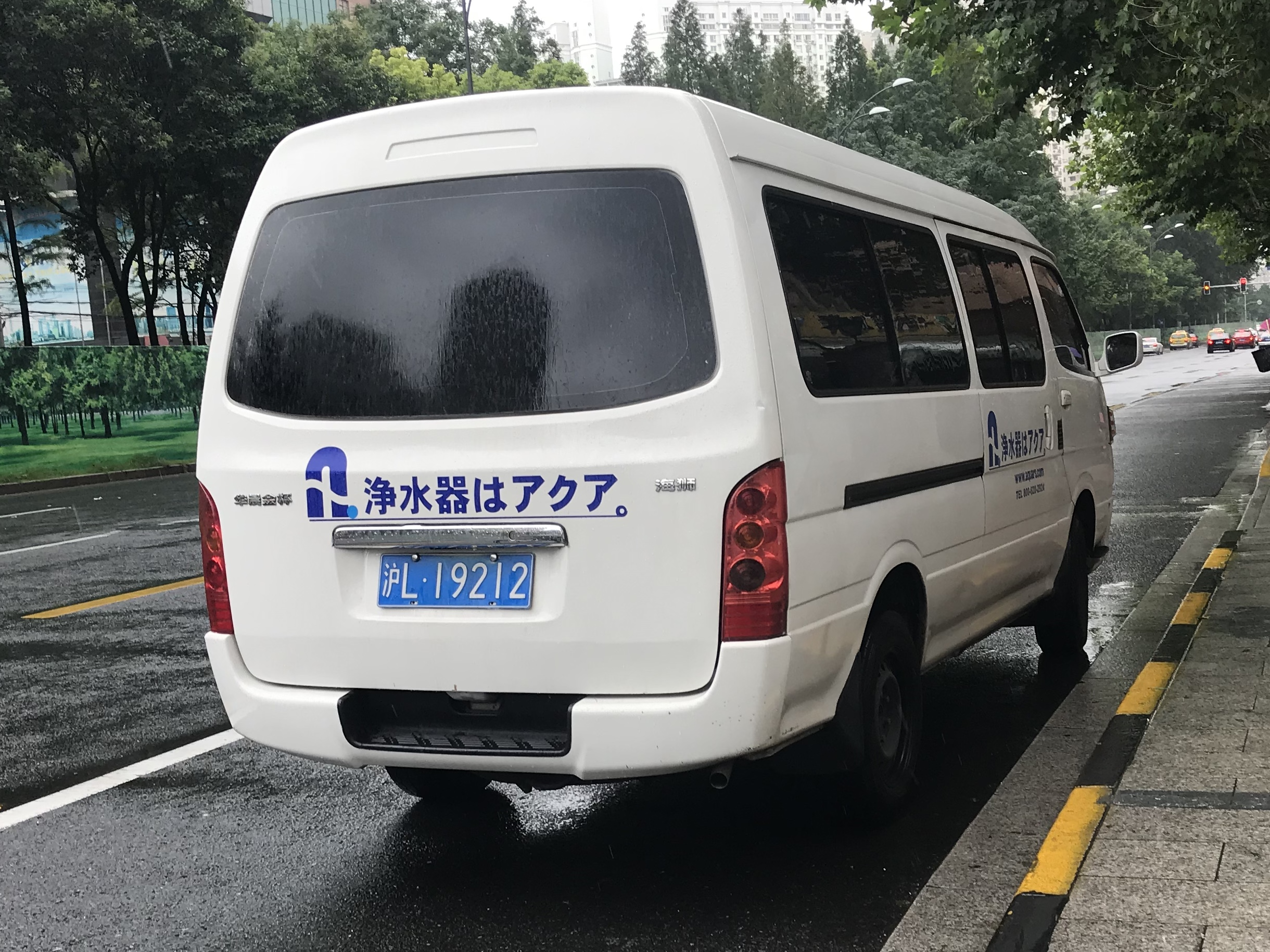
Jinbei Haise VI
