= Farda Motors =

Iranian automotive manufacturer

- Industry: Automotive
- Founded: 2013
- Headquarters: Tehran, Iran
- Products: Automobiles
- Owner: Golestan Group
- Subsidiaries: Farda Diesel
- Website: www.fardamotors.com

Farda Motors (Persian: فردا موتورز), trade name FMC (Farda Motors Company), is an Iranian automotive manufacturer established in 2013. It is a subsidiary of the Golestan Group, which is owned by the Grami family.

== History ==
Farda Motors, a subsidiary of the Golestan Group, was founded in 2013 in Iran. Initially, Iran Khodro outsourced its products to this company. The Samand and Peugeot Pars were the first products manufactured by Farda Motors in a factory in Semnan province. However, in early 2019, this company began production and introduced the MG RX5. However, shortly after, SAIC Motor ended its collaboration with this company.

After that, Farda Motors started assembling Dongfeng products. The first vehicle was the Forthing (Dongfeng Fengxing) SX6, which was introduced to the Iranian market as "Farda SX6" in late 2019. One year later, the company introduced another Dongfeng product to the Iranian market, the Forthing (Dongfeng Fengxing) Jingyi X5, under the name "FMC SX5".

In 2021, Farda Motors launched the Changan Alsvin sedan as their fourth vehicle with the Farda Motors logo on the front windshield, naming it "Farda 511." However, after some time, a dispute emerged between the two companies, and the production of this vehicle was stopped. During the same year, Farda Motors introduced the Forthing (Dongfeng Fengxing) T5 as the FMC T5.

In 2022 at the Tehran Auto Show, Farda Motors revealed the FMC M4 van. This vehicle, which was later renamed as Suba M4, was essentially a rebadged version of the Forthing Yacht. Additionally, an upgraded version of the FMC SX5 was introduced in the same year.

In 2022, Farda Motors launched its second production line by taking over the Zagross Khodro production line in Borujerd.

== Current models ==
- FMC SX5
- FMC T5
- FMC Suba M4
- FMC 511
- FMC P4
- FMC P5
