= Forthing Jingyi X3 =

Subcompact CUV

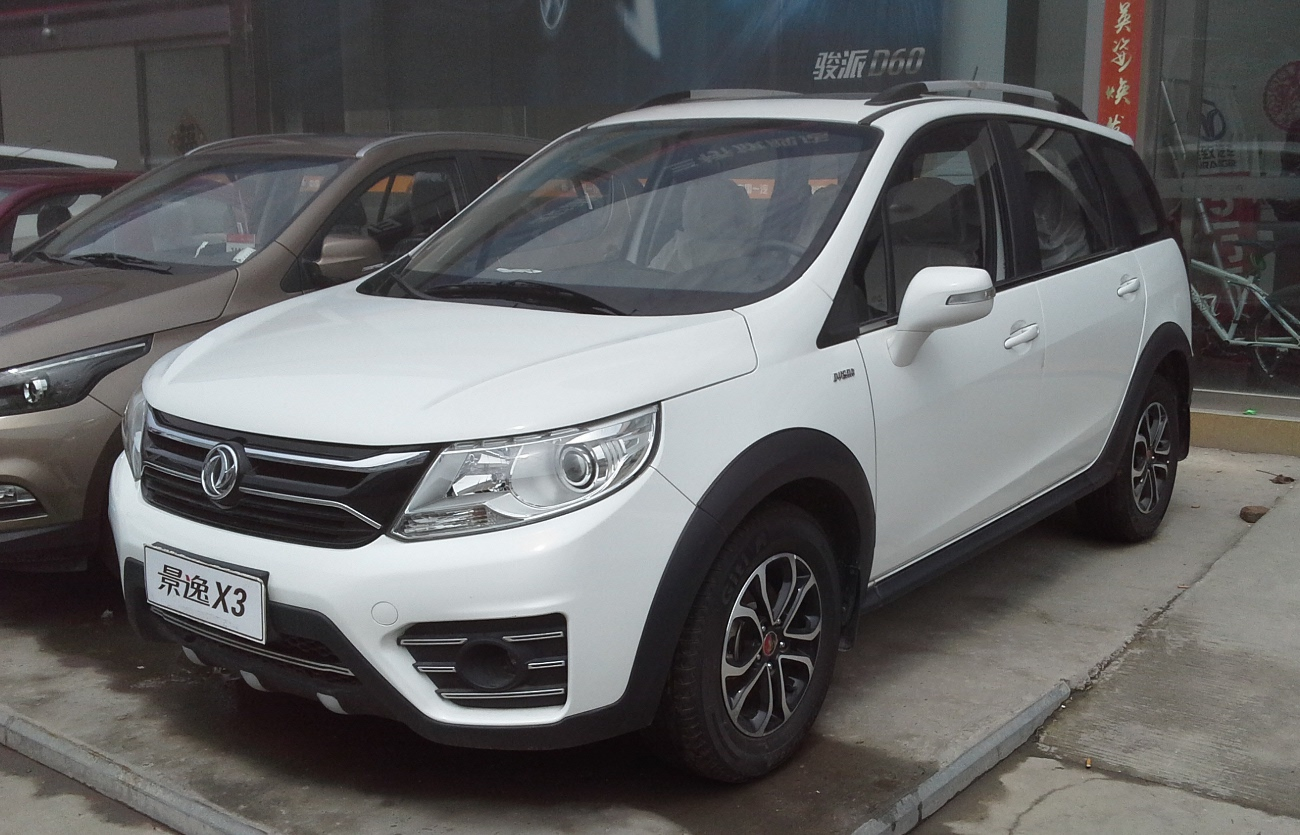

Overview
- Manufacturer: Dongfeng Liuzhou Motor
- Production: 2014—2019
- Assembly: Liuzhou, China

Body and chassis
- Class: Subcompact crossover SUV
- Body style: 5–door station wagon
- Layout: FF layout
- Related: Dongfeng Fengxing Jingyi X5; Mitsubishi Grandis

Powertrain
- Engine: 1.5 L 4A91 I4 (petrol)
- Transmission: 5 speed manual

Dimensions
- Wheelbase: 2,685 mm (105.7 in)
- Length: 4,382 mm (172.5 in)
- Width: 1,828 mm (72.0 in)
- Height: 1,705 mm (67.1 in)

The Forthing Jingyi X3 is a subcompact crossover SUV produced by Dongfeng Liuzhou Motor under the Jingyi product series of the Dongfeng Fengxing sub-brand.

== Overview ==
The Forthing Jingyi X3 is positioned under the first generation Forthing Jingyi X5 compact MPV it shares the platform with at launch. It was launched in 2014 with prices ranges from 66,900 yuan to 86,900 yuan. Design is similar to the facelifted Dongfeng Fengxing Jingyi X5 I as the two vehicle shares the same platform. A minor facelift was launched in 2016 refreshing the front grilles.

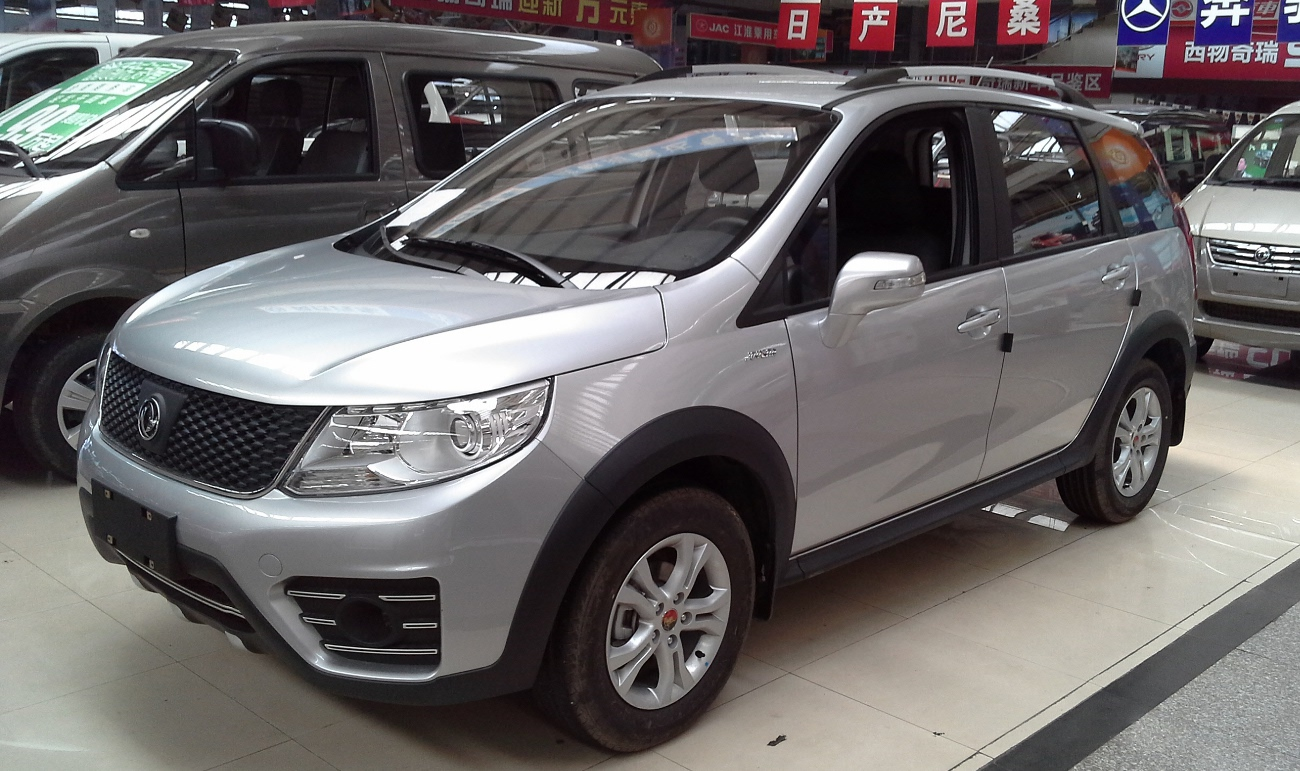
Dongfeng Fengxing Jingyi X3 pre-facelift front view

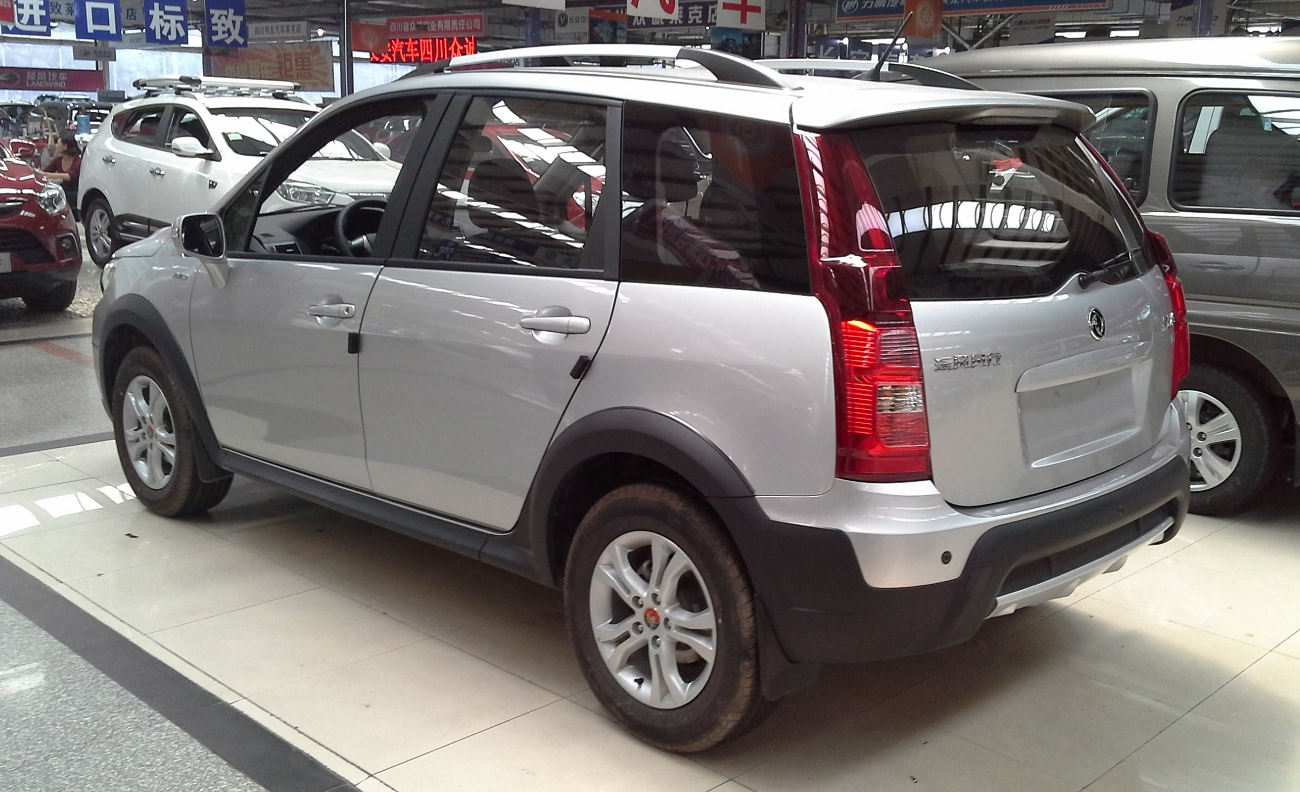
Dongfeng Fengxing Jingyi X3 pre-facelift rear view
