= Forthing T5 =

Crossover SUV

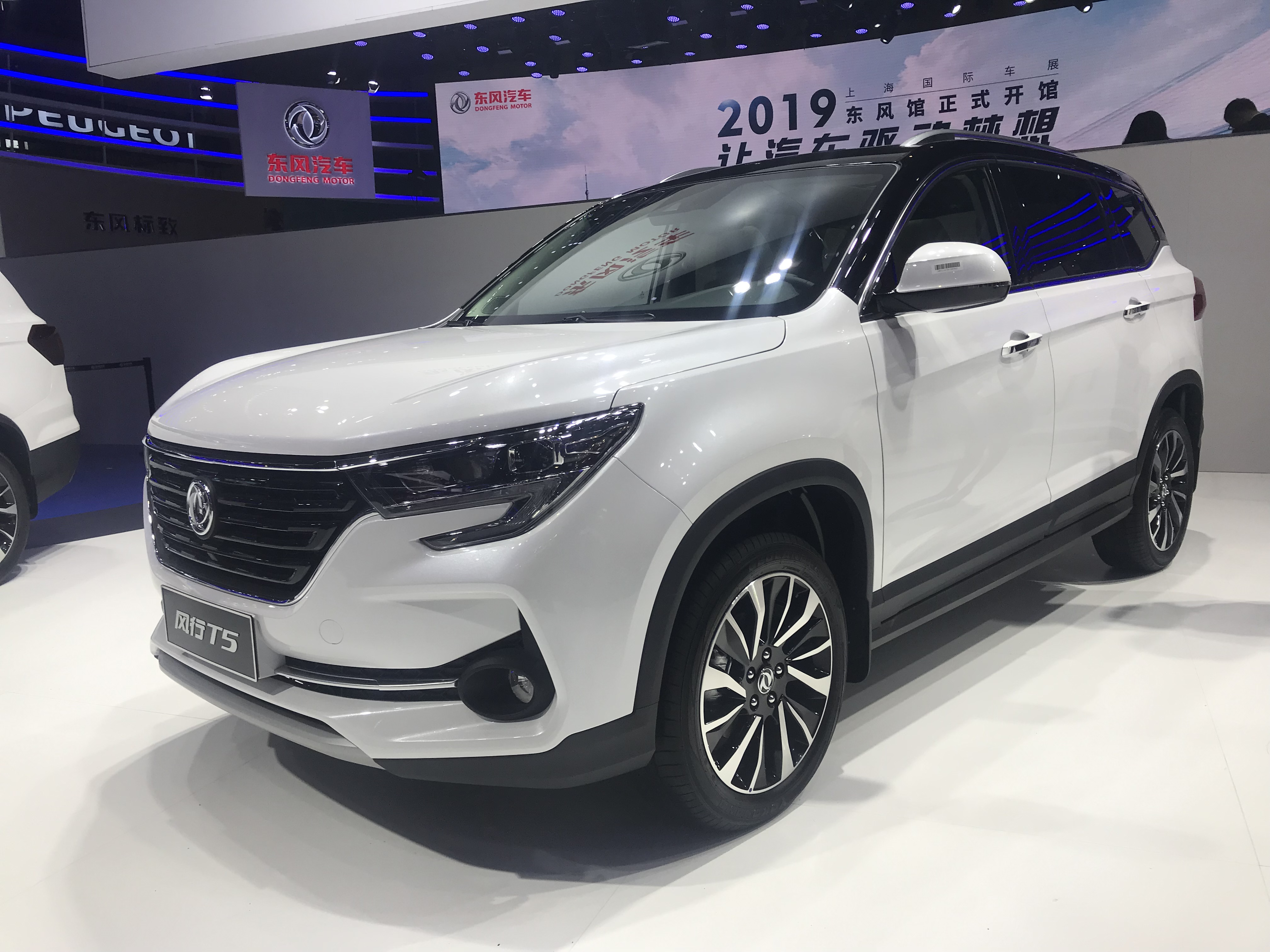

Overview
- Manufacturer: Forthing
- Also called: Farda T5 (Iran)
- Production: 2018–present
- Assembly: China: Liuzhou; Iran: Semnan; Borujerd (FMC)

Body and chassis
- Class: Compact crossover SUV (C)
- Body style: 5-door SUV
- Layout: Front engine, front wheel drive
- Related: Dongfeng Fengxing Jingyi X5; Forthing Yacht

Powertrain
- Engine: Petrol: 1.5 L turbo I4; 1.6 L turbo I4; 1.8 L turbo I4
- Transmission: 6-speed manual; CVT; 7-speed dual-clutch

Dimensions
- Wheelbase: 2,720 mm (107.1 in)
- Length: 4,550 mm (179.1 in)
- Width: 1,825 mm (71.9 in)
- Height: 1,725 mm (67.9 in)
- Kerb weight: 1,520–1,585 kg (3,351–3,494 lb)

The Forthing T5 is a compact crossover SUV produced by Forthing or originally Dongfeng Fengxing sub-brand. A larger 7-seater mid-size crossover SUV variant called the Forthing T5L is also offered from the 2019 model year.

== Overview ==
The Forthing T5 was launched as a compact crossover SUV under the Fengxing or Forthing brand of Dongfeng Motor Group for China, it officially debuted as a prototype during the 2018 Beijing Auto Show in April 2018, with the production version complying the National Standard V Emission standard of China available from Q3 2018.

The updated English name of the original Fengxing brand was also launched with the Dongfeng Fengxing T5 which is "Forthing", with the name labeled on the tailgate of the T5.

The Forthing T5's powertrain comes from a 1.6 liter turbo engine producing 204 hp (152 kW; 207 PS) and 280 N⋅m (207 lb⋅ft; 29 kg⋅m) of torque. Prices ranges from 84,900 yuan to 135,900 yuan.

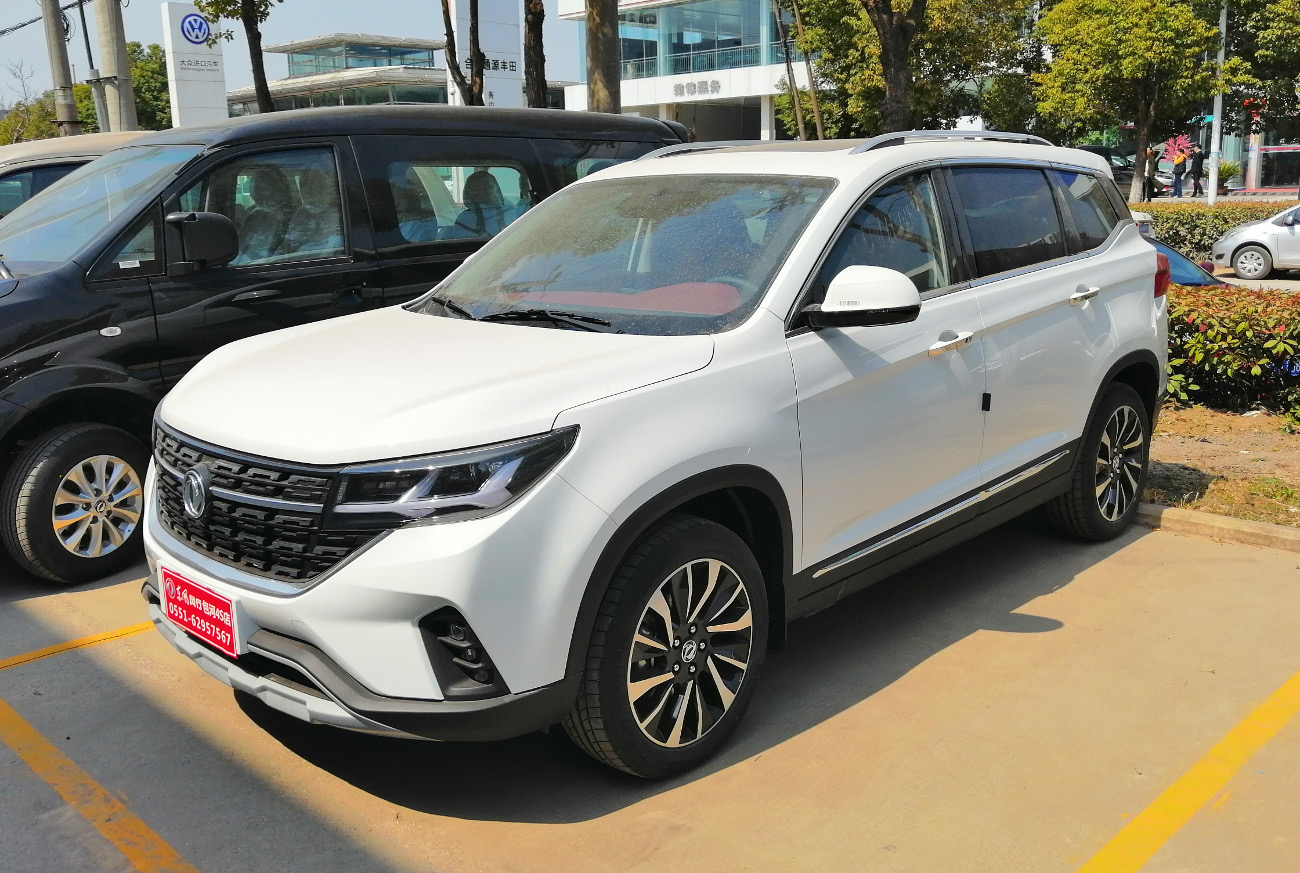
2018 Fengxing (Forthing) T5 (National Standard V, pre facelift) front

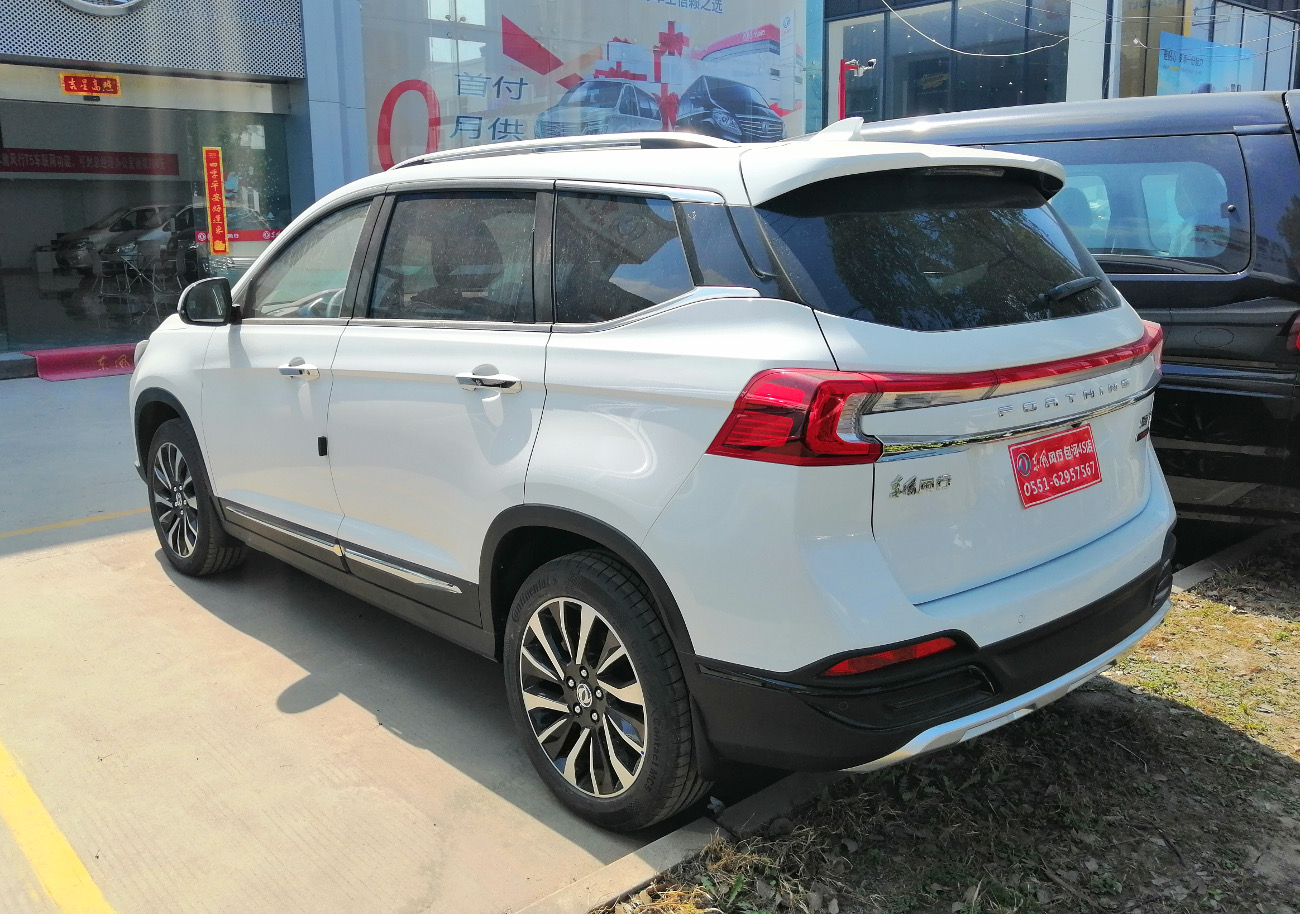
2018 Fengxing (Forthing) T5 (National Standard V, pre facelift) rear

=== 2019 facelift (National Standard VI) ===
A facelift of the Forthing T5 complying with the National Standard VI emission standard of China was revealed at the 2019 Shanghai Auto Show featuring a slightly restyled front fascia which looks like current Renault lineup's design language.

The 2019 facelifted T5 is equipped with a 1.5 liter turbo engine producing 150 hp (110 kW; 150 PS) and 210 N⋅m (155 lb⋅ft) and a 1.6-litre turbo diesel engine producing 204 hp (152 kW; 207 PS).

The 1.5 liter turbo version is available with either a 6-speed manual gearbox or a CVT, while the 1.6 liter turbo diesel version is only available with a 7-speed DCT.

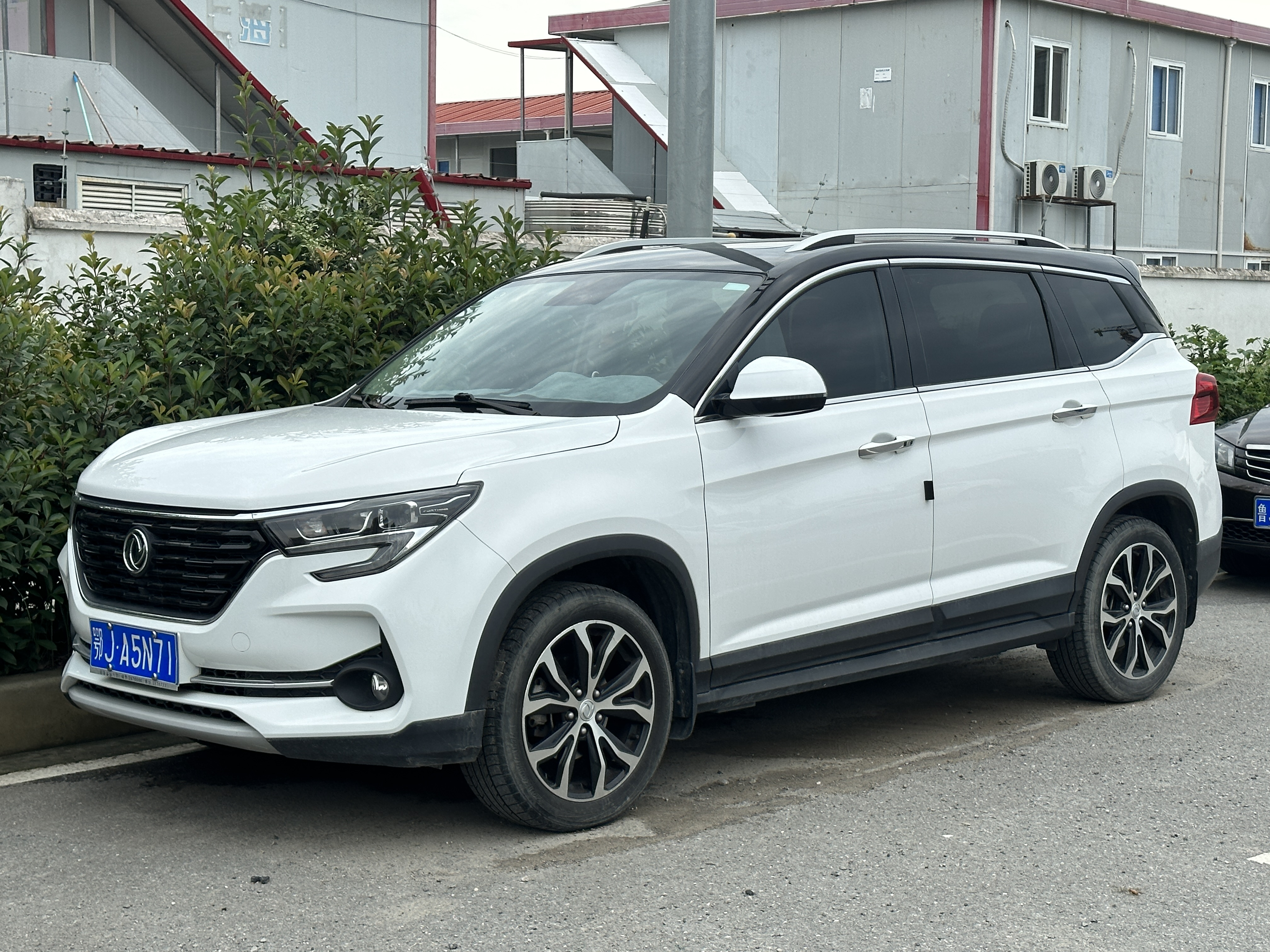
Forthing T5 facelift front

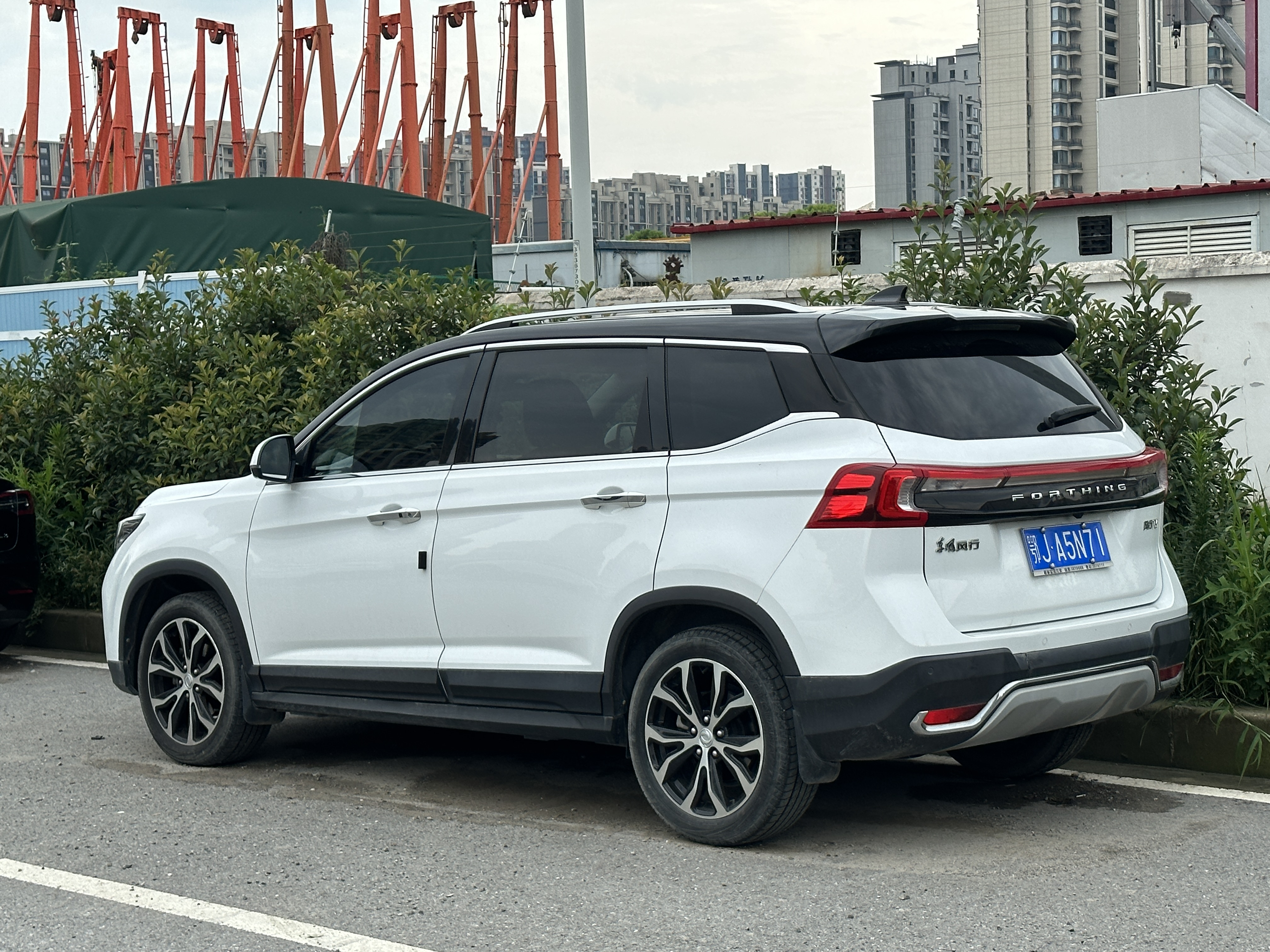
Forthing T5 facelift rear

== Forthing T5L ==
Forthing T5L
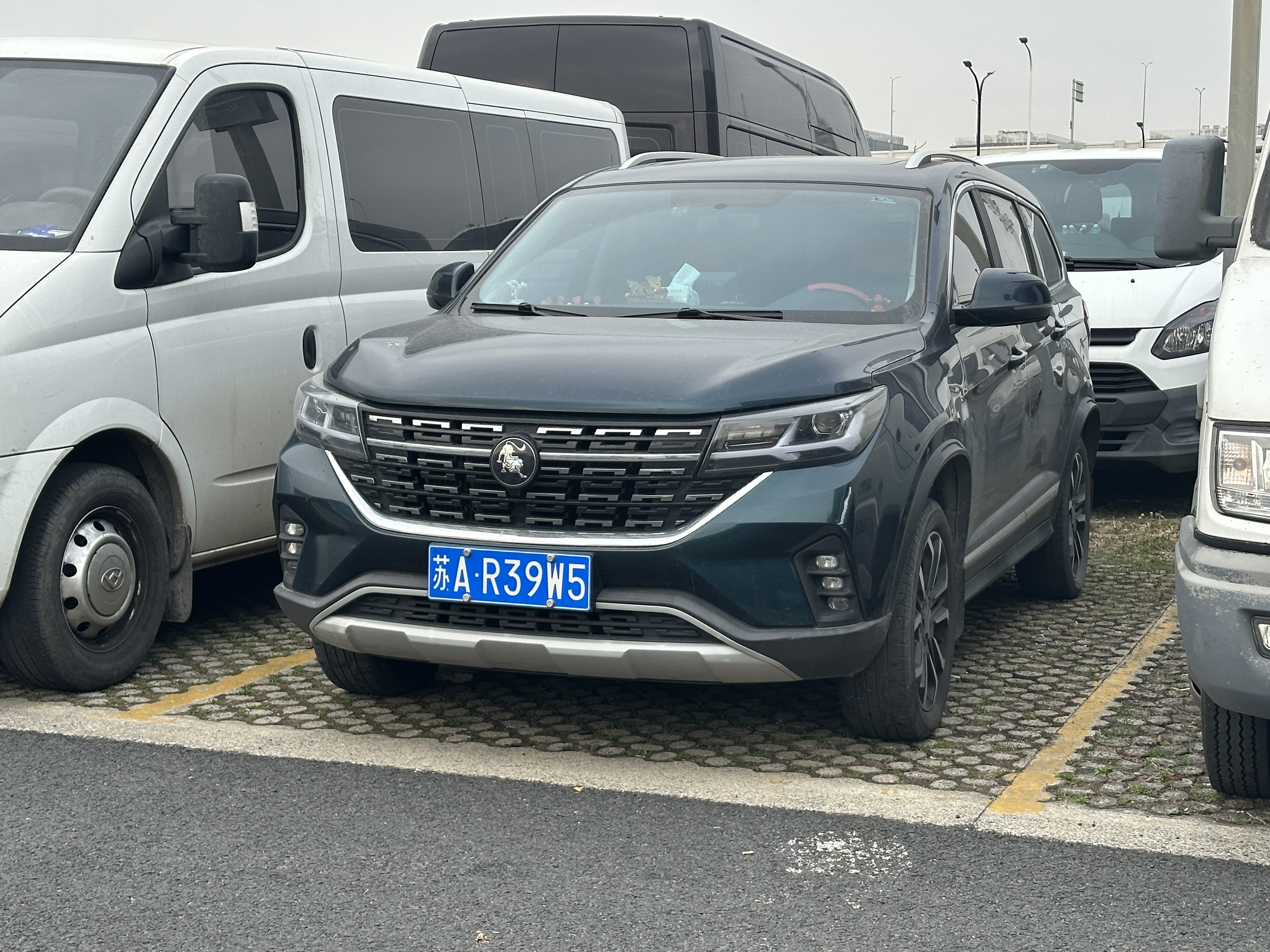

Overview
- Manufacturer: Forthing
- Also called: IVM/Innoson G5T (Nigeria); Dongfeng SX6 Pro (Peru); Cirelli 3zero3 (Italy)
- Production: 2019–2021
- Assembly: China: Liuzhou

Body and chassis
- Class: Mid-size crossover SUV
- Body style: 5-door SUV
- Layout: Front engine, front wheel drive
- Related: Dongfeng Fengxing Jingyi X5

Powertrain
- Engine: Petrol: 1.6 L turbo I4
- Transmission: 6-speed manual; CVT; 7 speed dual-clutch

Dimensions
- Wheelbase: 2,753 mm (108.4 in)
- Length: 4,789 mm (188.5 in)
- Width: 1,872 mm (73.7 in)
- Height: 1,760 mm (69.3 in)

A pre-production model was revealed during the 2018 Chengdu Auto Show called the Fengxing T7, a seven-seater mid-size crossover that will be positioned above the original Fengxing T5, which is essentially a longer version of the T5, and was later renamed to Forthing T5L for the production version. The model hit the market on 30 March 2019 as the Forthing T5L.

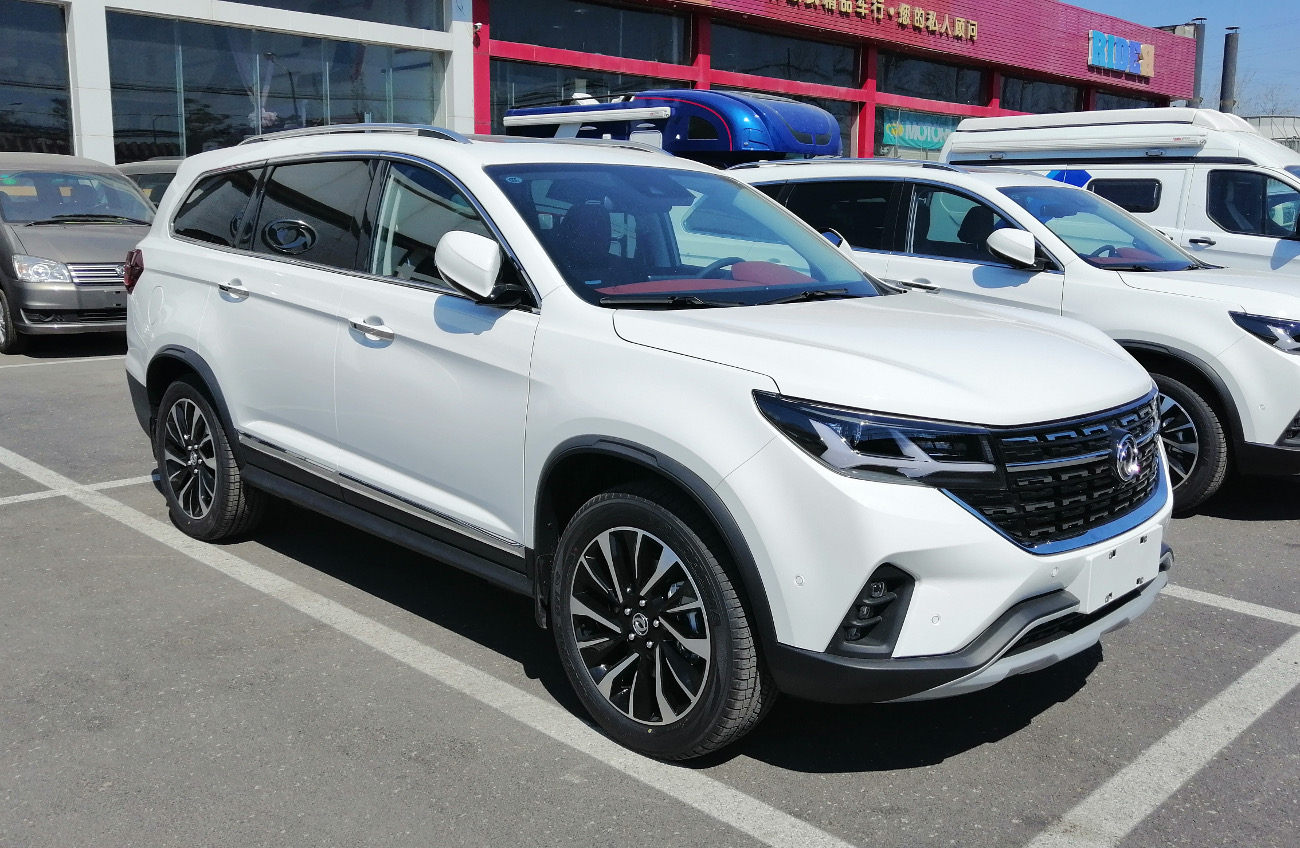
2019 Forthing T5L front

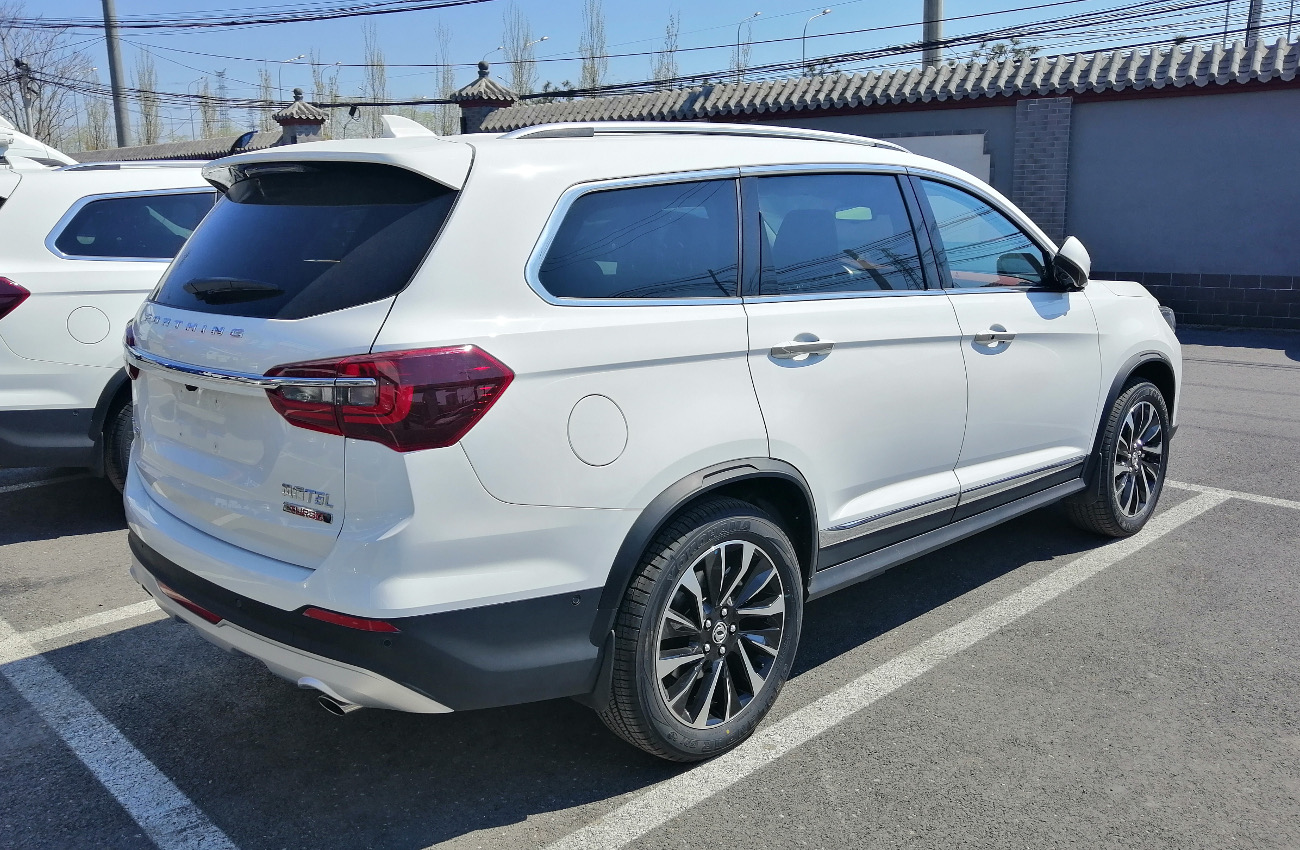
2019 Forthing T5L rear

=== Interior ===
The Forthing T5L is a 7-seater in 2+3+2 layout, the second and third rows can be folded flat. The trunk volume of the Forthing T5L in the 5-seat state reaches 1600L, and with the second and third rows of seats are all folded up, the trunk capacity can expand to 2370L. The interior features include a push-button starter, hill descent control, electronic handbrake, panoramic sunroof and panoramic imaging.

=== Powertrain ===
The Forthing T5L is powered by a 1.6 liter turbo engine, codenamed CE16, which is based on the development of BMW N13 engine. The CE16 engine inherits BMW’s Valvetronic variable valve lift and twin scroll turbocharging technology, producing a maximum power output of 150 kW (201 hp; 204 PS) and maximum torque of 280 N⋅m (207 lb⋅ft).

=== Forthing T5 Mach Edition ===
From 2022, the Forthing T5L was simply sold as the 7-seater variant Forthing T5, dropping the "L" moniker. Later in September 2022, the Forthing T5 received an update called the "Mach Edition". Just like the other Forthing Mach Edition vehicles, the T5 Mach Edition features bright color accents and a restyled front end. The powertrain is the "Mach power" 1.5-liter turbo engine producing a maximum output of 140kW (190hp) and a torque of 300N·m and a 7-speed dual-clutch transmission.

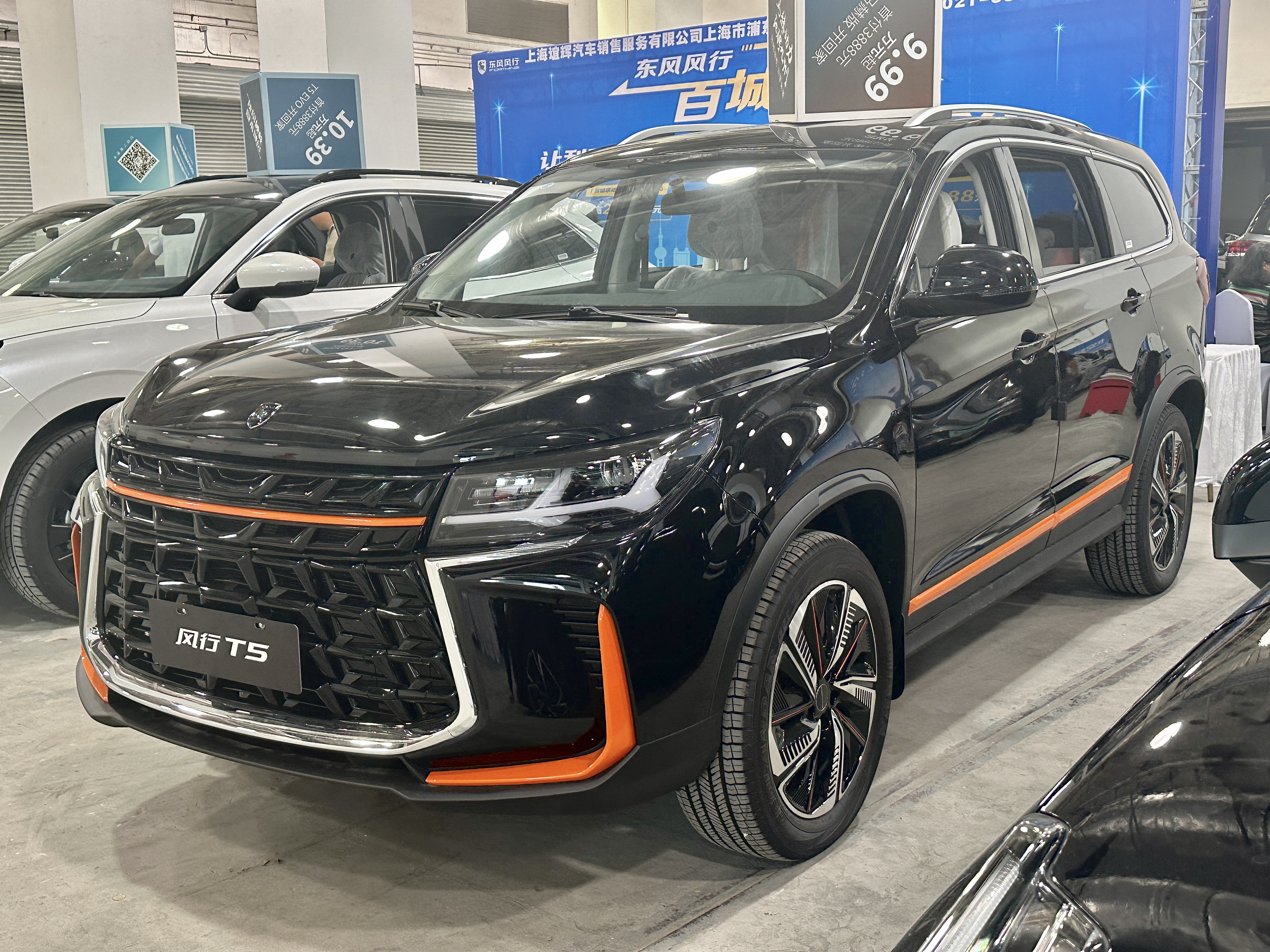
Forthing T5 Mach Edition

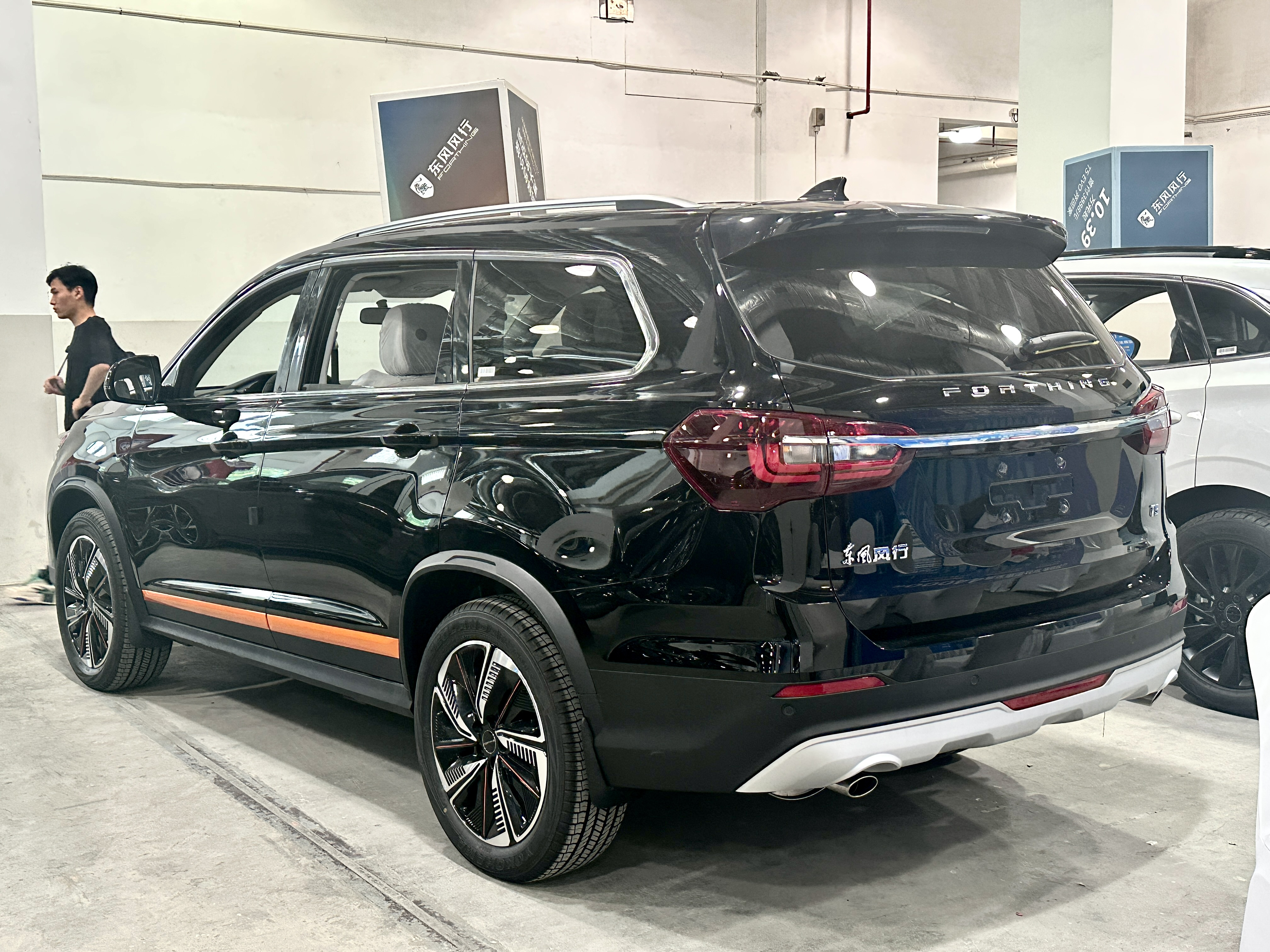
Forthing T5 Mach Edition (rear)

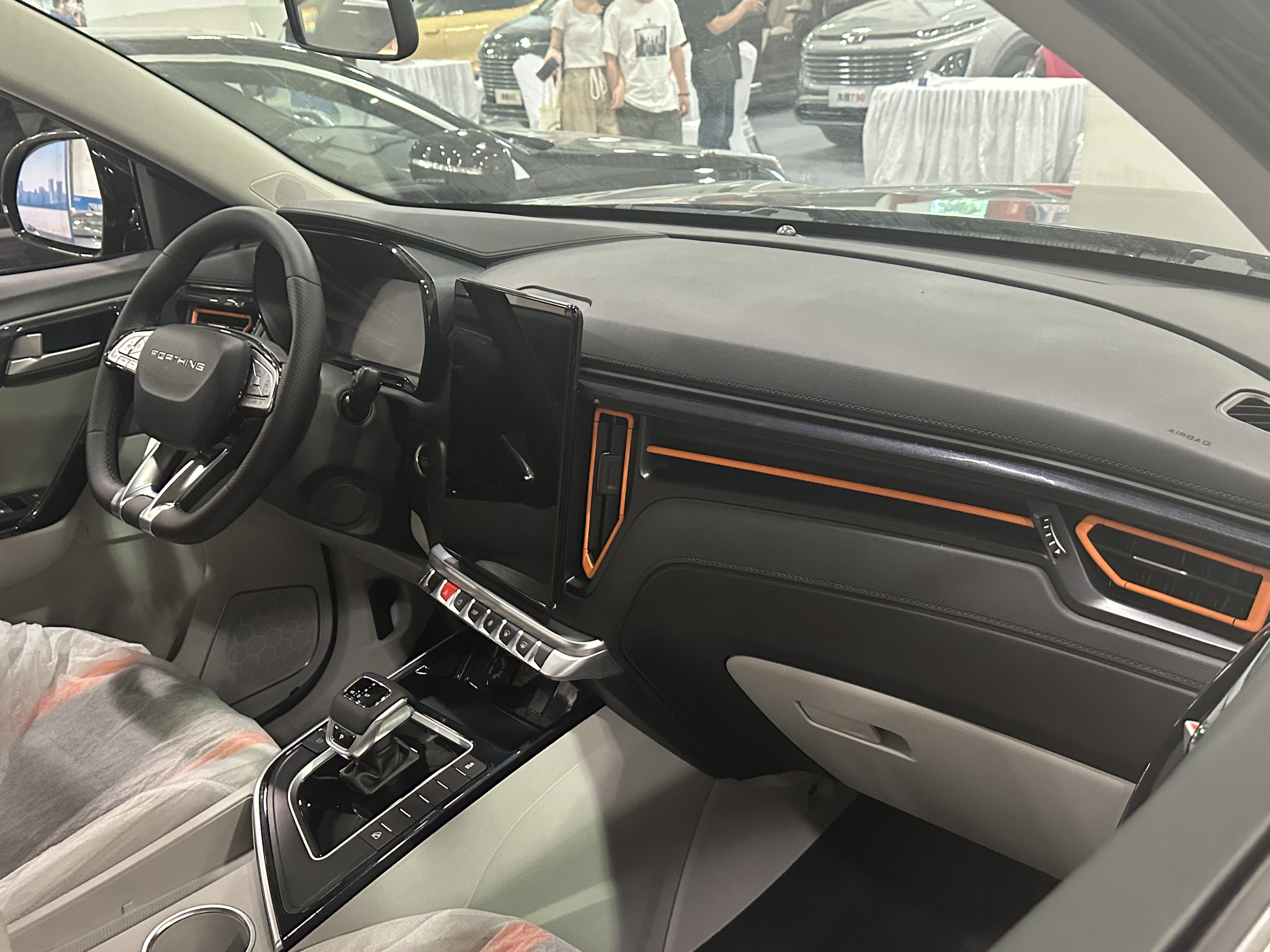
Forthing T5 Mach Edition (interior)

== Sales ==
Year	China
2022	5,446
2023	15,521
2024	15,612
