= Dongfeng Fengxing Jingyi =

Dongfeng Fengxing Jingyi (东风风行景逸) is a series of passenger vehicles sold under the Dongfeng Fengxing (东风风行) sub-brand of Dongfeng Liuzhou Motor, a subsidiary of Dongfeng Motors.

== History ==
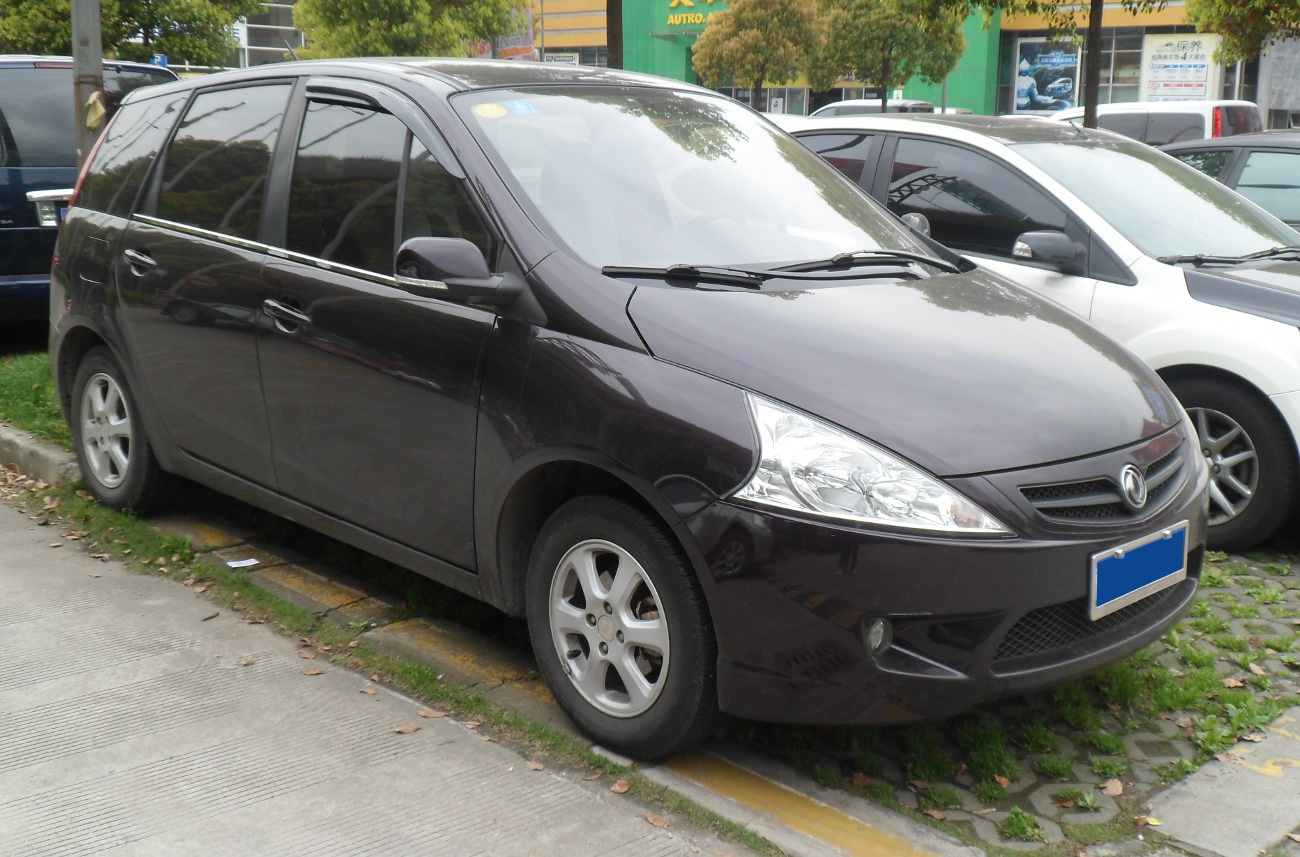
Dongfeng Fengxing Jingyi compact MPV

The Dongfeng Fengxing Jingyi (景逸) was originally a compact MPV produced by Dongfeng Liuzhou Motor under the Dongfeng Fengxing sub-brand. The compact MPV was later renamed to Dongfeng Fengxing Jingyi X5 as the Dongfeng Fengxing Jingyi became a series of passenger vehicles including sedans, CUVs, and MPVs.

== Products ==
- Jingyi S50 compact sedan/Jingyi S50 EV electric compact sedan
- Jingyi X3 subcompact crossover
- Jingyi X5 compact crossover
- Jingyi X6 mid-size crossover
- Jingyi X7 mid-size crossover

== Product Gallery ==
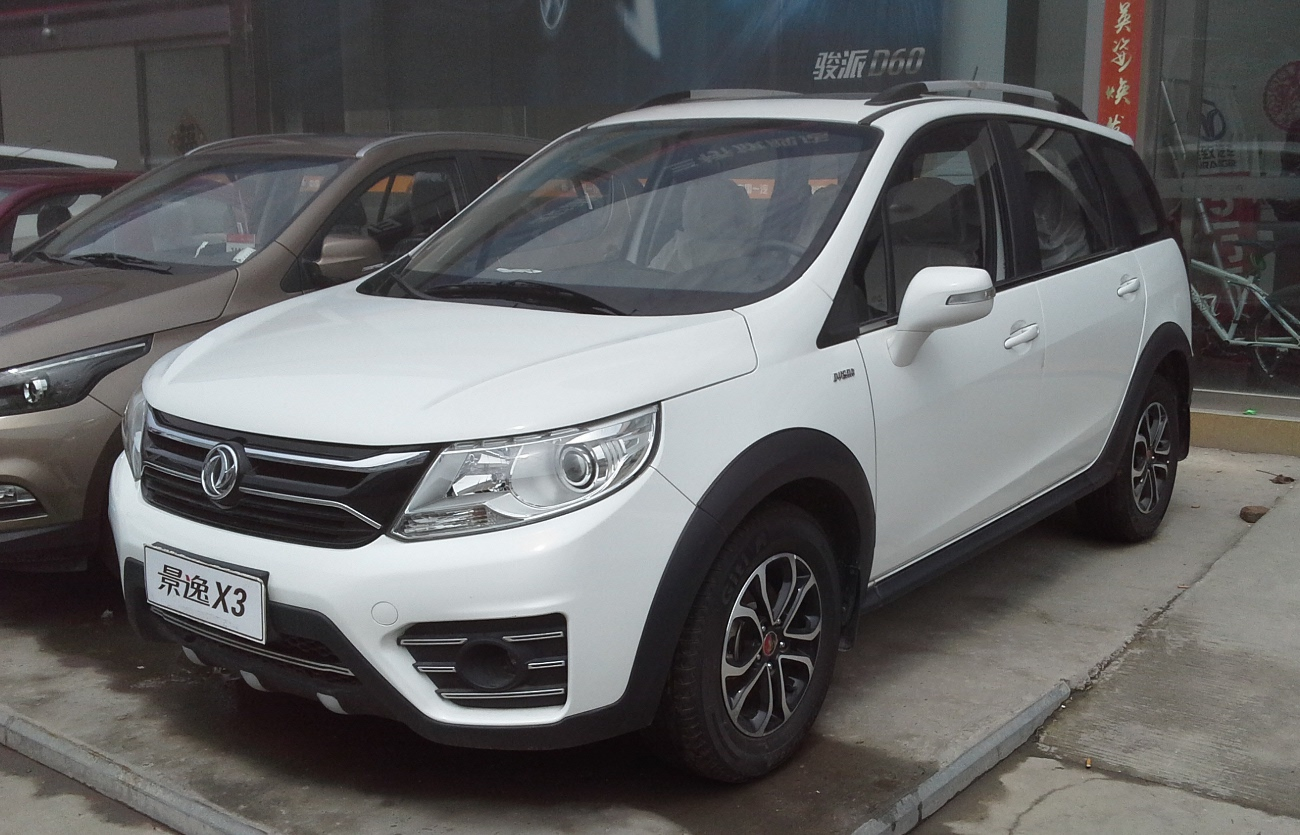
Dongfeng Fengxing Jingyi X3

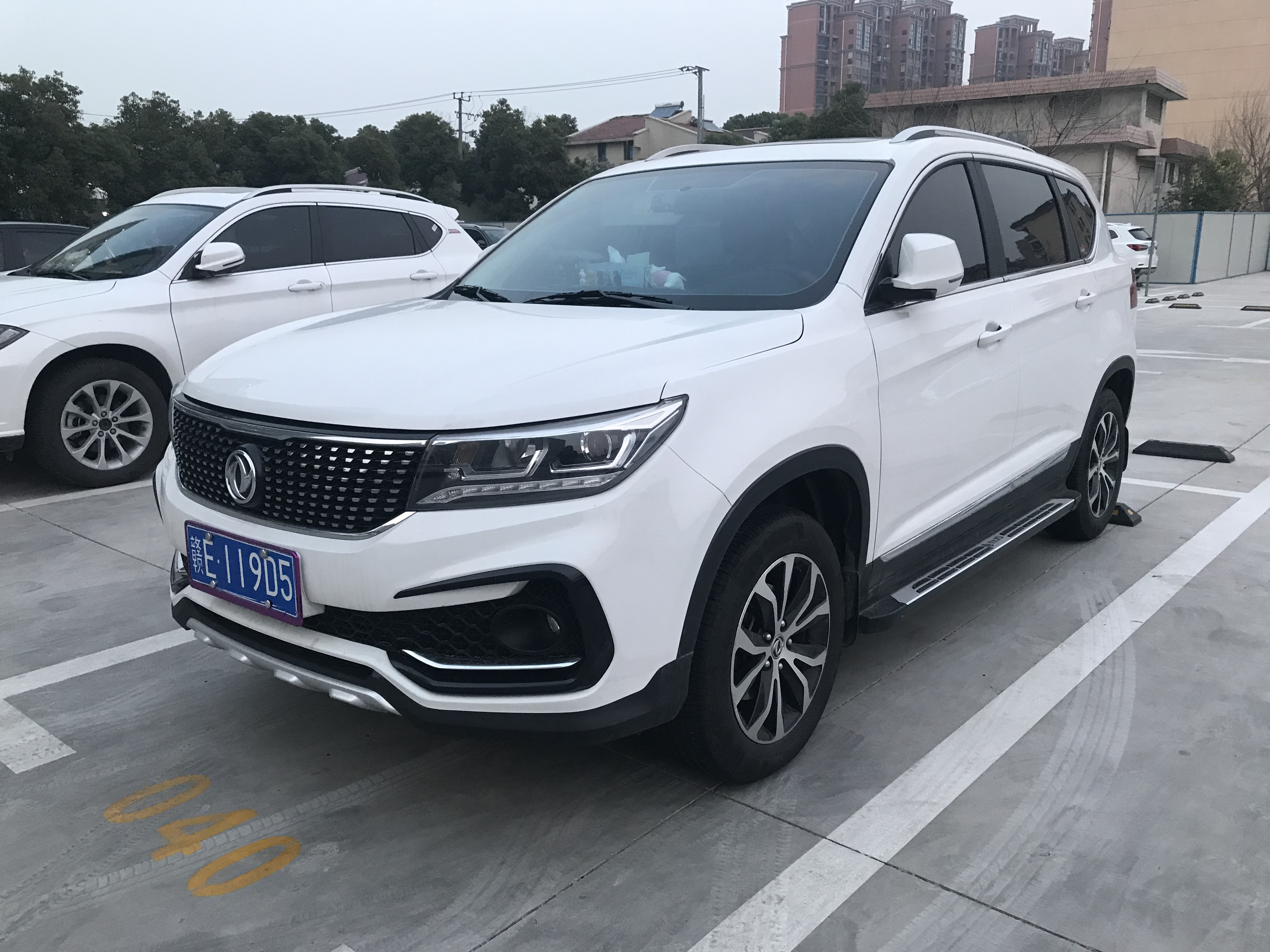
Dongfeng Fengxing Jingyi X5 II

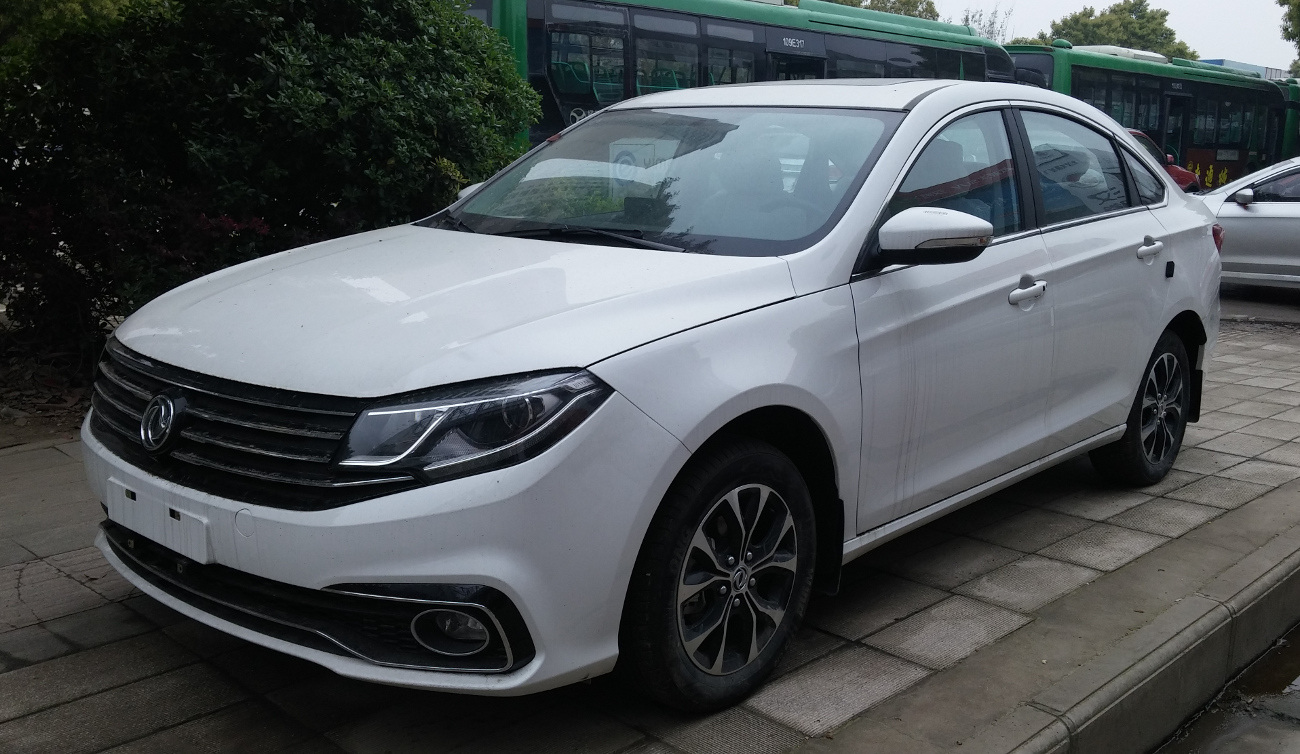
Dongfeng Fengxing Jingyi S50
