= Forthing Yacht =

Chinese minivan

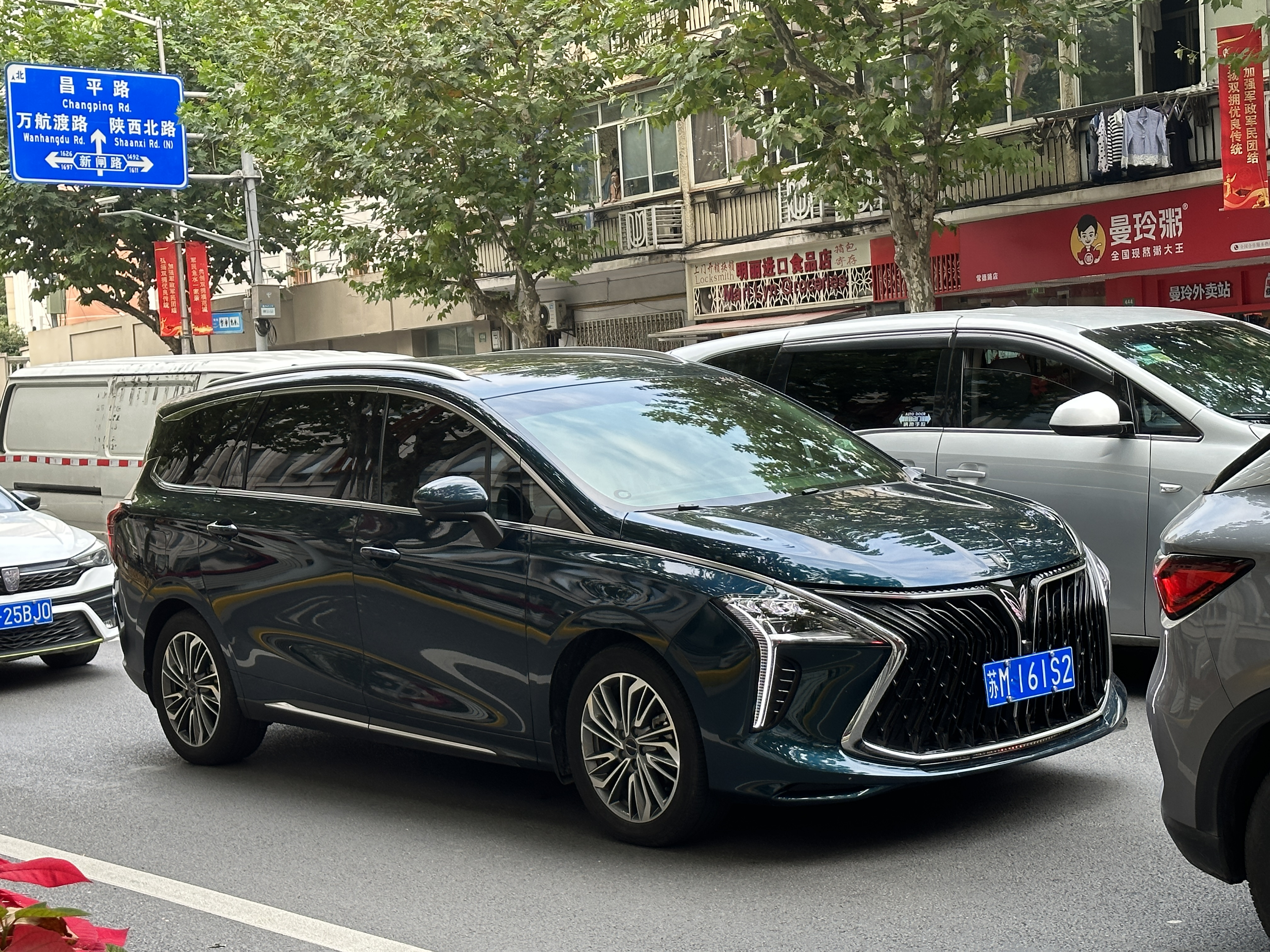

Overview
- Manufacturer: Forthing
- Model code: M4
- Also called: Forthing U-Tour (Europe); FMC Suba M4 (Iran); Cirelli 7 (Italy); EVO Spazio (Italy)
- Production: 2022–present
- Assembly: China: Liuzhou

Body and chassis
- Class: Minivan (M)
- Body style: 5-door minivan
- Layout: FF layout
- Platform: Super Cube EMA
- Related: Forthing T5 Evo; Forthing Xinghai V9

Powertrain
- Engine: 1.5 L turbo I4 petrol engine
- Transmission: 7-speed DCT

Dimensions
- Wheelbase: 2,900 mm (114.2 in)
- Length: 4,850 mm (190.9 in)
- Width: 1,900 mm (74.8 in)
- Height: 1,715 mm (67.5 in)
- Curb weight: 1,715–2,260 kg (3,781–4,982 lb)

The Forthing Yacht (Chinese: 风行 游艇; pinyin: Fengxing Youting) is a minivan produced by Dongfeng Liuzhou Motor under the Forthing brand. The Forthing Yacht is based on the Super Cube EMA architecture of the Forthing brand with semi-independent rear suspension and available as both six and seven seat versions.

== Overview ==
Originally codenamed M4 during development phase and unveiled at the 2021 Guangzhou Auto Show, the Forthing Yacht was launched on 15 April 2022. The Forthing Yacht is powered by a Shenyang Aerospace-Mitsubishi Motors joint-venture manufactured 1.5-litre turbocharged inline-4 engine producing a maximum output of 197 hp (147 kW; 200 PS) with peak torque of 285 N⋅m (210 lb⋅ft; 29 kg⋅m). The engine is mated to a 7-speed Magna wet dual-clutch automatic gearbox. Top speed is electronically limited to 180 km/h (112 mph).

The interior of the Forthing Yacht is equipped with two 10.25-inch screens on the front, and the climate control has a separate remote on the center console. The media system is integrated with voice control and over-the-air update function. In terms of safety, the Forthing Yacht has six or eight airbags depending on configuration, adaptive cruise control, automatic braking system and autonomous parking. The interior was first available as a seven-seat cabin in a 2+2+3 configuration with the seats upholstered in Nappa leather.

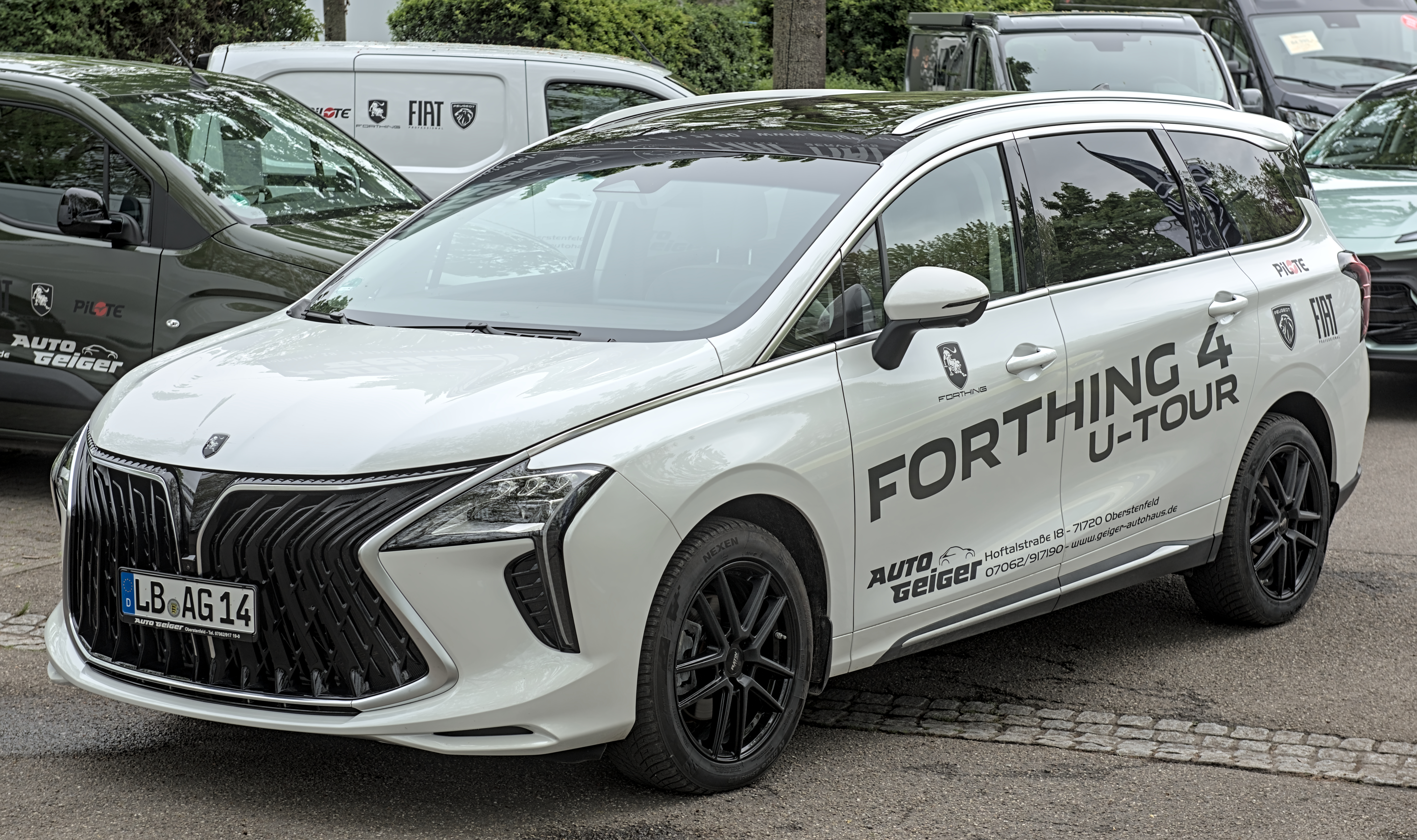
Forthing U-Tour (Europe)

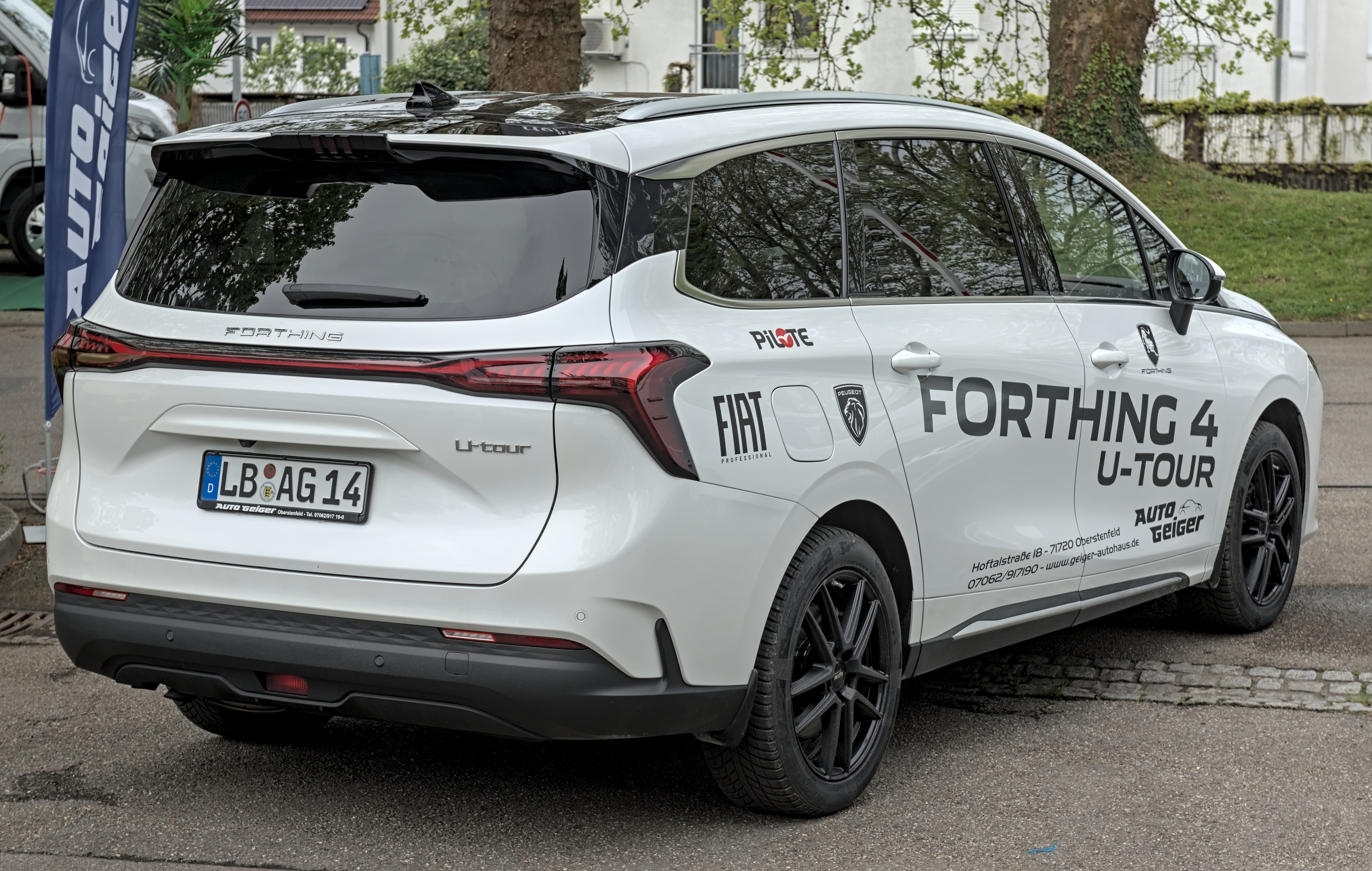
Rear view

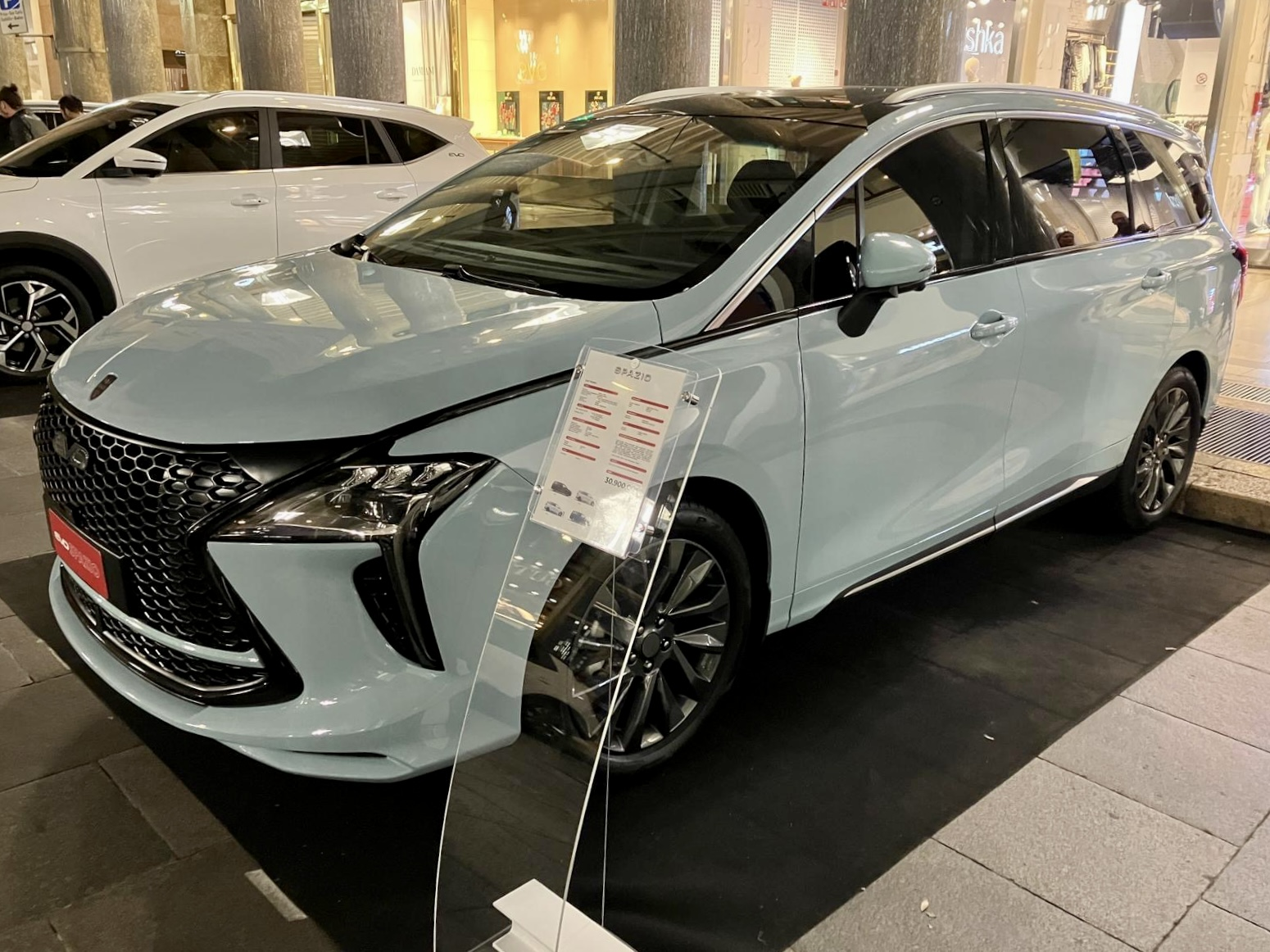
EVO Spazio (Italy)

== Markets ==
=== Iran ===
At the 2022 Tehran Auto Show, The Farda Motors Company (FMC) introduced this car under the name FMC Suba M4 for the Iranian market. This car was pre-sold in March 2023 and entered the Iranian market in May 2023. In January 2024, Forthing M4 U-tour began to be sold in Belarus.

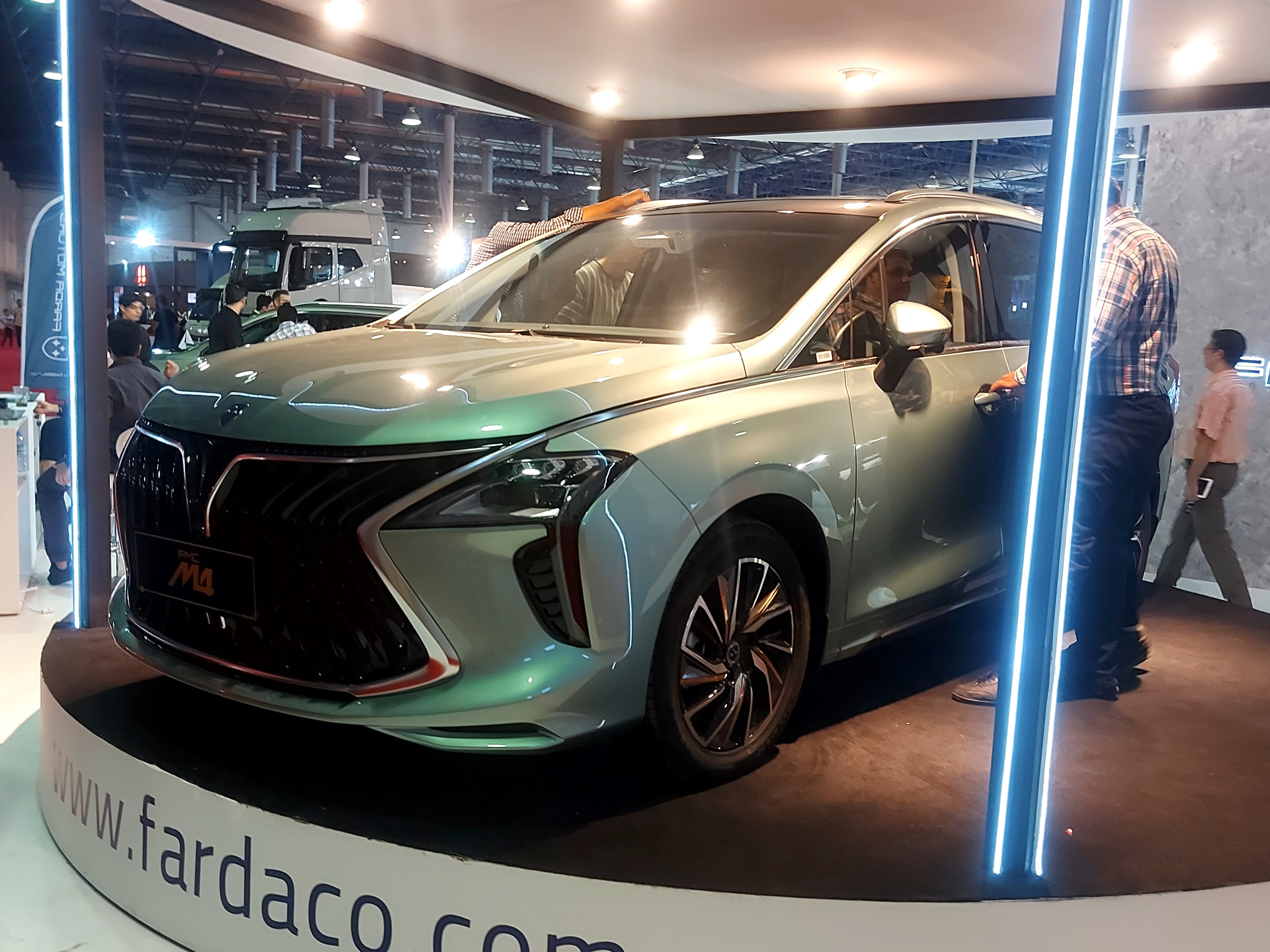
FMC Suba M4 (Iran)

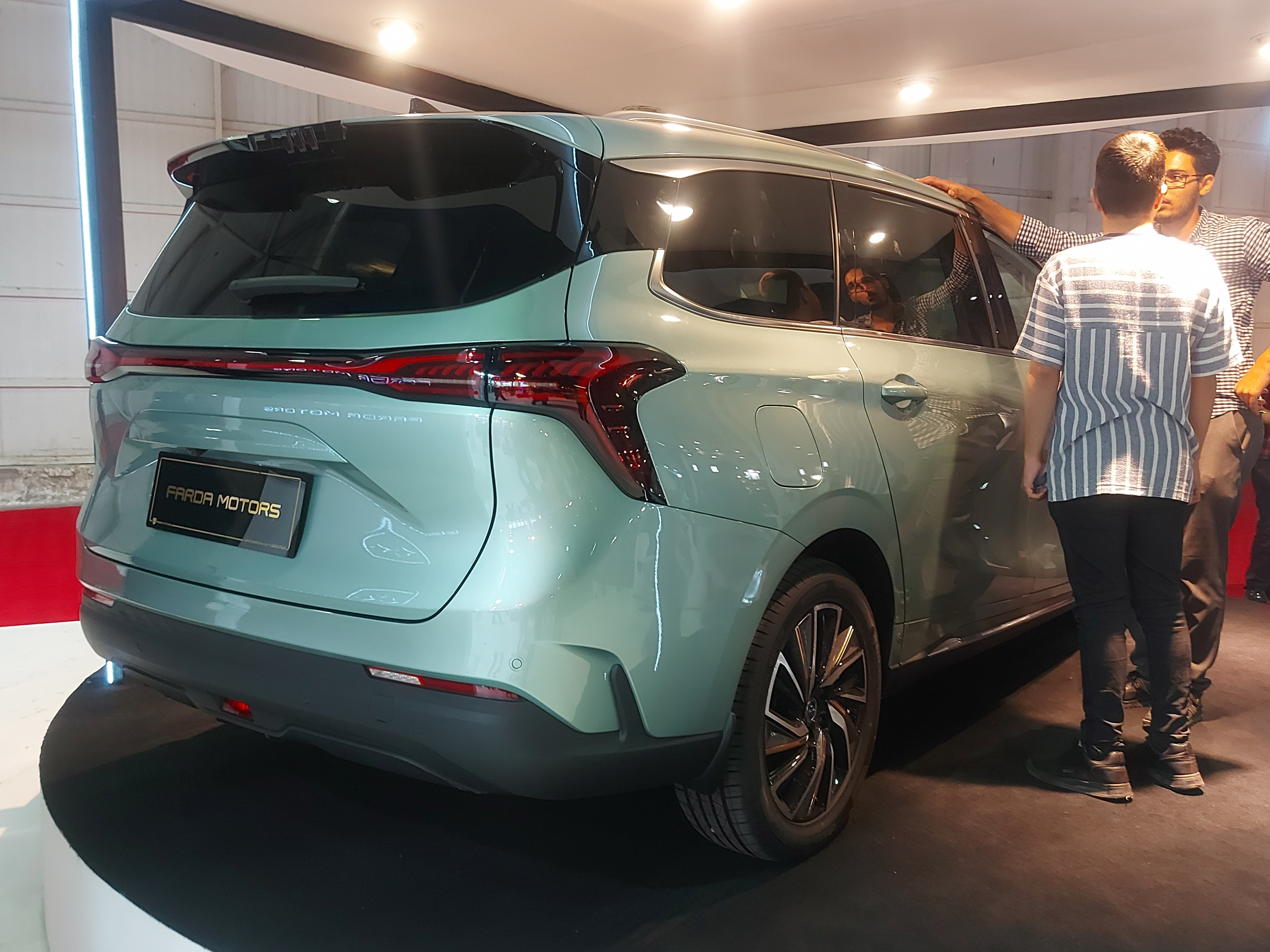
Rear view

== Forthing Xinghai V6 ==
Forthing Xinghai V6

Overview
- Also called: Forthing TK7 (Europe, Thailand)
- Production: 2026–present
- Assembly: China: Liuzhou

Powertrain
- Electric motor: 135 kW YY39TZ180S01

Dimensions
- Wheelbase: 2,910 mm (114.6 in)
- Length: 4,900 mm (192.9 in)
- Width: 1,900 mm (74.8 in)
- Height: 1,755 mm (69.1 in)
- Curb weight: 1,810 kg (3,990 lb)

The Xinghai V6 was introduced in April 2026 at the Beijing Auto Show and is expected to launch in the third quarter of 2026. According to Dongfeng Liuzhou representatives, it is the first model under the Forthing brand to be developed in collaboration with Huawei.

It is powered by a front-mounted electric motor capable of producing 135 KW power and 260 NM of torque, giving it a high speed of 160 KM/h. Electric motor relies on an LFP battery with the capacity of 45.5 KW/h or 60.5 KW/h. Full charge provides a range of 400 or 510 Kilometers receptively.

For the 400KM model, Forthing Xinghai V6 is priced at 89900 yuan (13310 USD) but for the 510KM model which also comes with more standard features like panoramic sunroof, captain chair second row seats, 50W wireless phone charging pad, power tailgate, Level 2 driver assistance systems and heated/ventilated driver's seat, the asking price rises to 104900 yuan which is around 15530 USD.

Rear view

== Sales ==
Year	China
2022	3,912
2023	4,354
2024	1,002
2025	196
