= Forthing Jingyi X5 =

Dongfeng Fengxing Jingyi X5
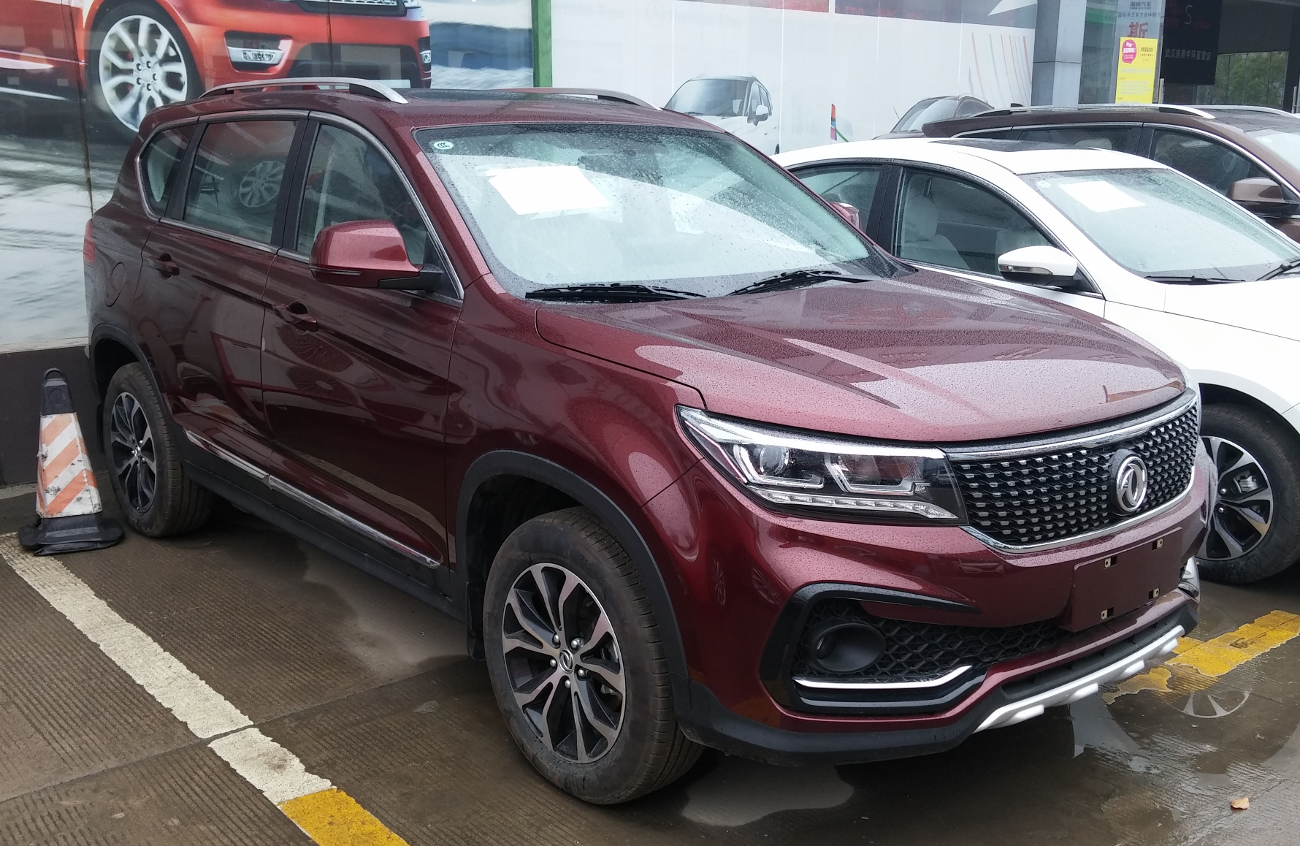

Overview
- Manufacturer: Forthing (Dongfeng Liuzhou Motor)
- Production: 2013–2021

The Forthing Jingyi X5 is a compact crossover SUV produced by Dongfeng Liuzhou Motor under the Jingyi product series of the Forthing (Dongfeng Fengxing) sub-brand.

== First generation (Fengxing Jingyi X5 I) ==
Forthing (Dongfeng Fengxing) Jingyi X5 I
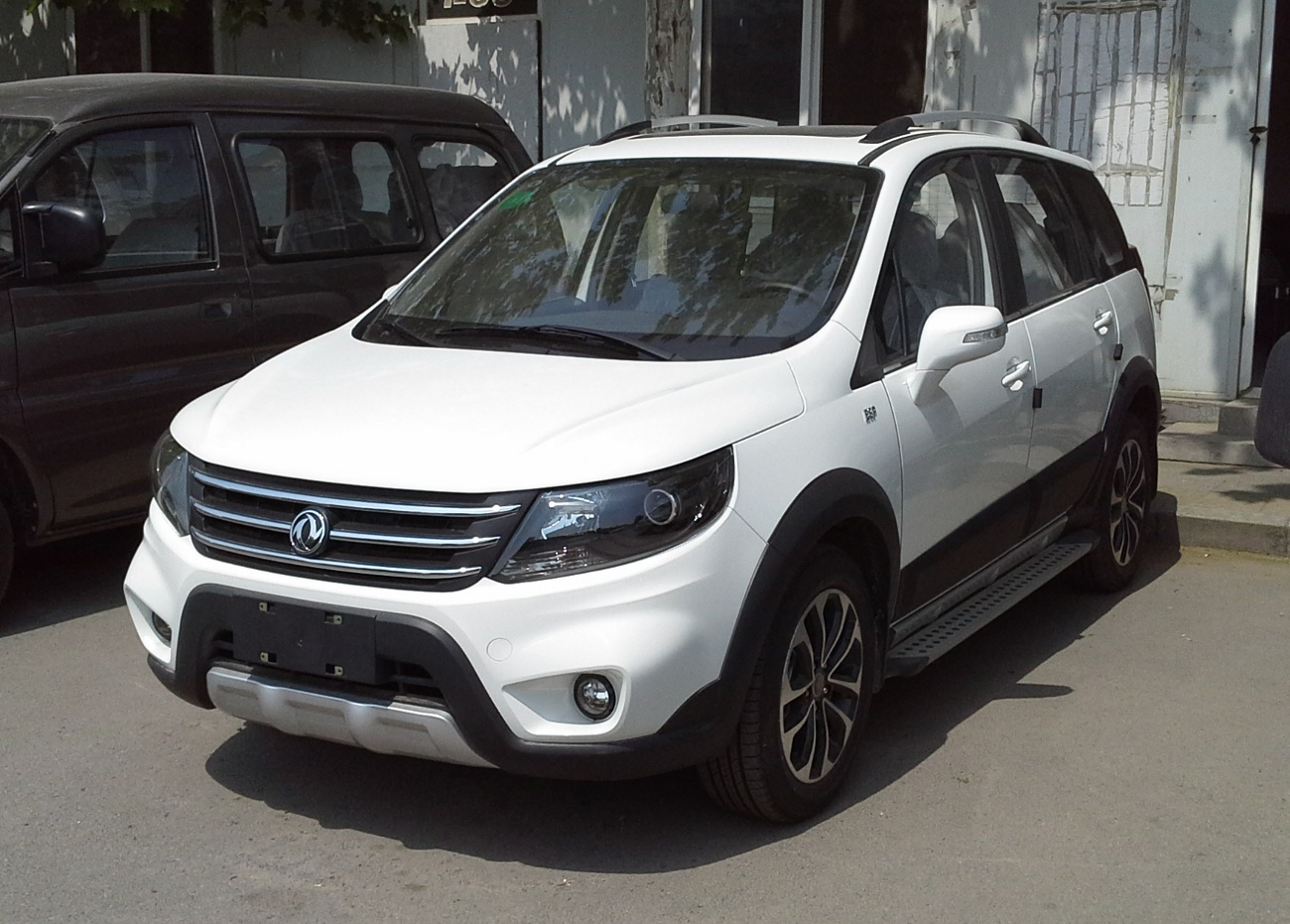

Overview
- Manufacturer: Forthing (Dongfeng Liuzhou Motor)
- Also called: Dongfeng Fengxing Jingyi; Dongfeng Fengxing Jingyi LV/SUV; Dongfeng Fengxing Jingyi Cross; Dongfeng Fengxing Joyear
- Production: 2013–2016
- Assembly: Liuzhou, China

Body and chassis
- Body style: 5–door SUV
- Layout: FF layout
- Related: Dongfeng Fengxing Jingyi X3; Mitsubishi Grandis; Forthing Jingyi X6

Powertrain
- Engine: 1.6 L 4A92 I4 (petrol); 1.8 L 18K4G I4 turbo (petrol)
- Transmission: 5 speed manual

Dimensions
- Wheelbase: 2,600 mm (102.4 in)
- Length: 4,347 mm (171.1 in)
- Width: 1,835 mm (72.2 in)
- Height: 1,739 mm (68.5 in)

Chronology
- Successor: Forthing Jingyi X5 II

The first generation Dongfeng Fengxing Jingyi X5 was originally named simply Dongfeng Fengxing Jingyi. It was a compact MPV produced by Dongfeng Liuzhou Motor under the Dongfeng Fengxing sub-brand based on a modified chassis of the Mitsubishi Grandis. The only engine for the Jingyi is a 1.6 liter with 122hp and 155nm, mated to a 5-speed manual transmission.

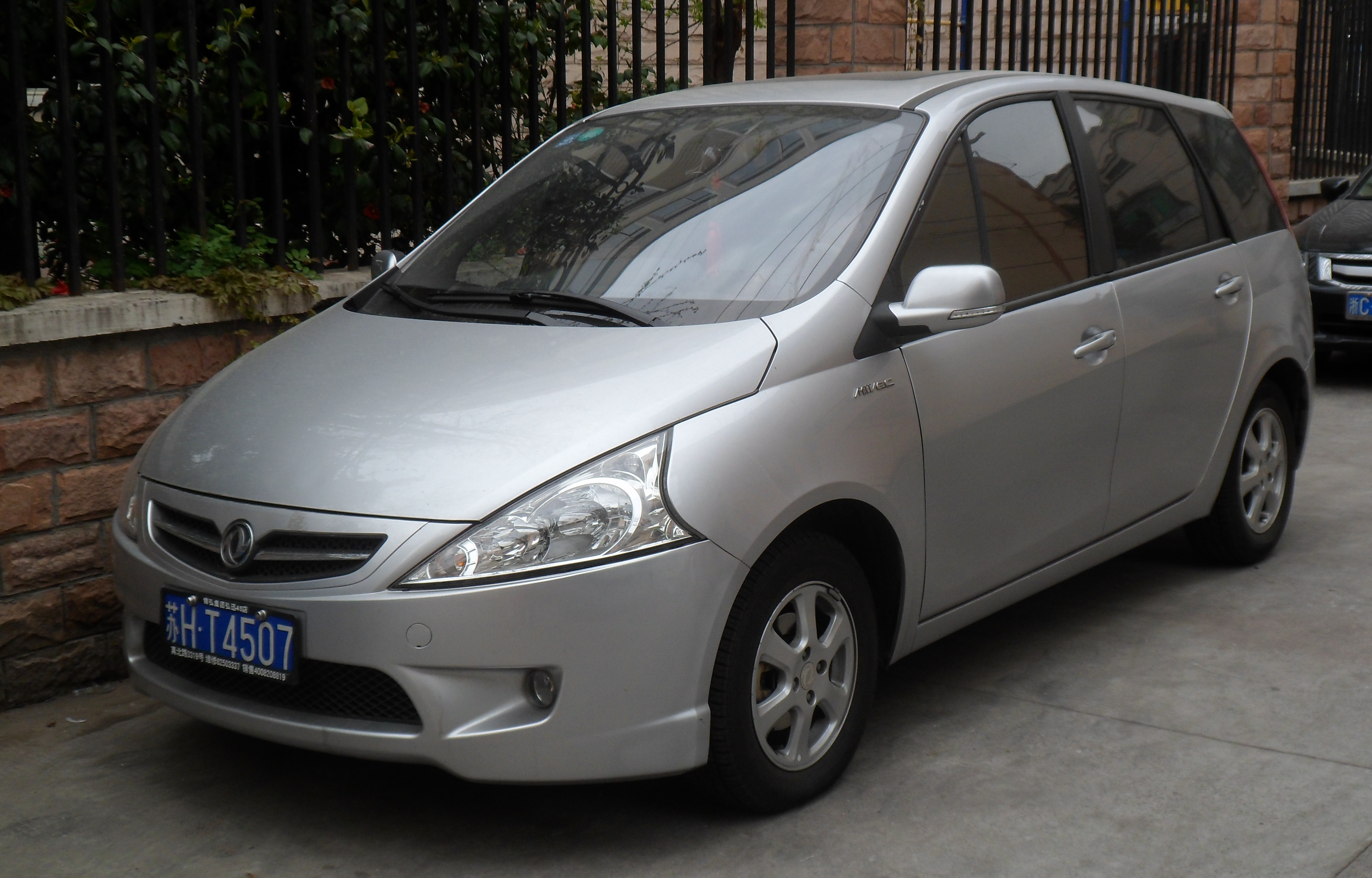
Dongfeng Fengxing Jingyi front (pre-facelift)

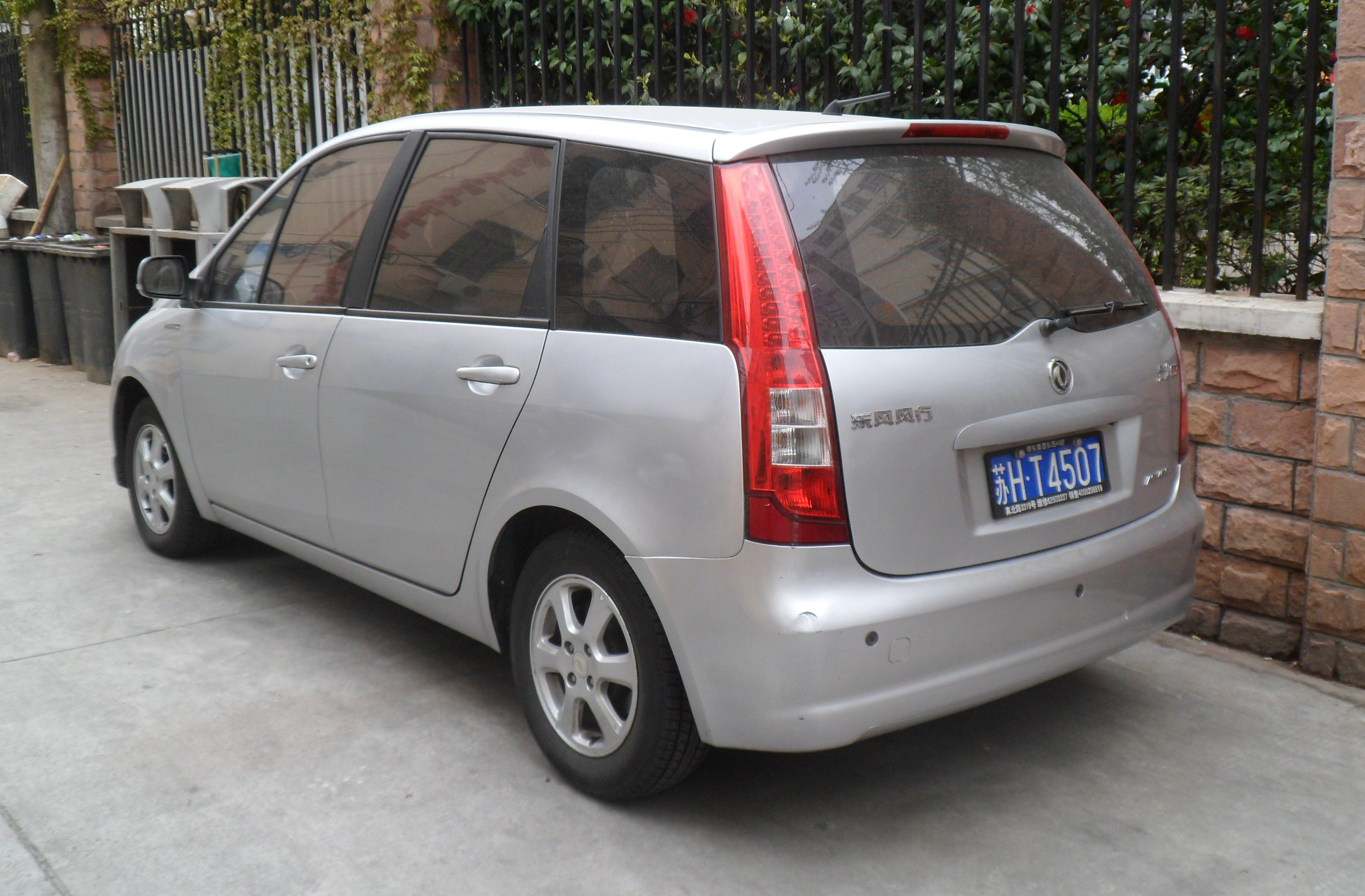
Dongfeng Fengxing Jingyi rear (pre-facelift)

A version with different grilles and crossover cues including plastic claddings around the wheel arches and bumpers was also available as the Dongfeng Fengxing Jingyi LV or Dongfeng Fengxing Jingyi SUV before the facelift. After the facelift, the whole front DRG was updated and the crossover cues became standard. The compact MPV was renamed to Dongfeng Fengxing Jingyi X5 after the facelift as the Dongfeng Fengxing Jingyi became a series of passenger vehicles. Prices ranges from 99,900 yuan to 105,900 yuan.

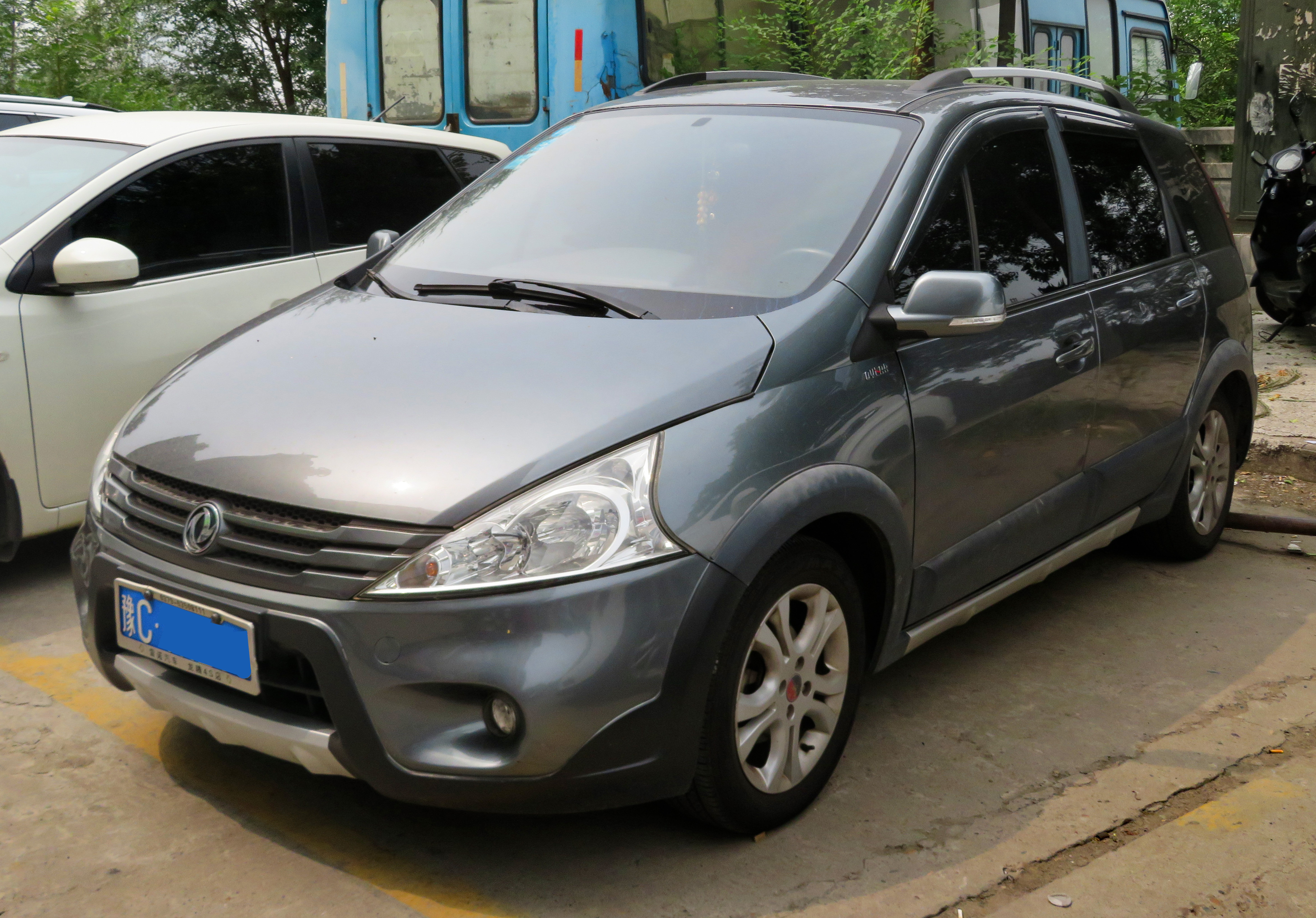
Dongfeng Fengxing Jingyi LV front

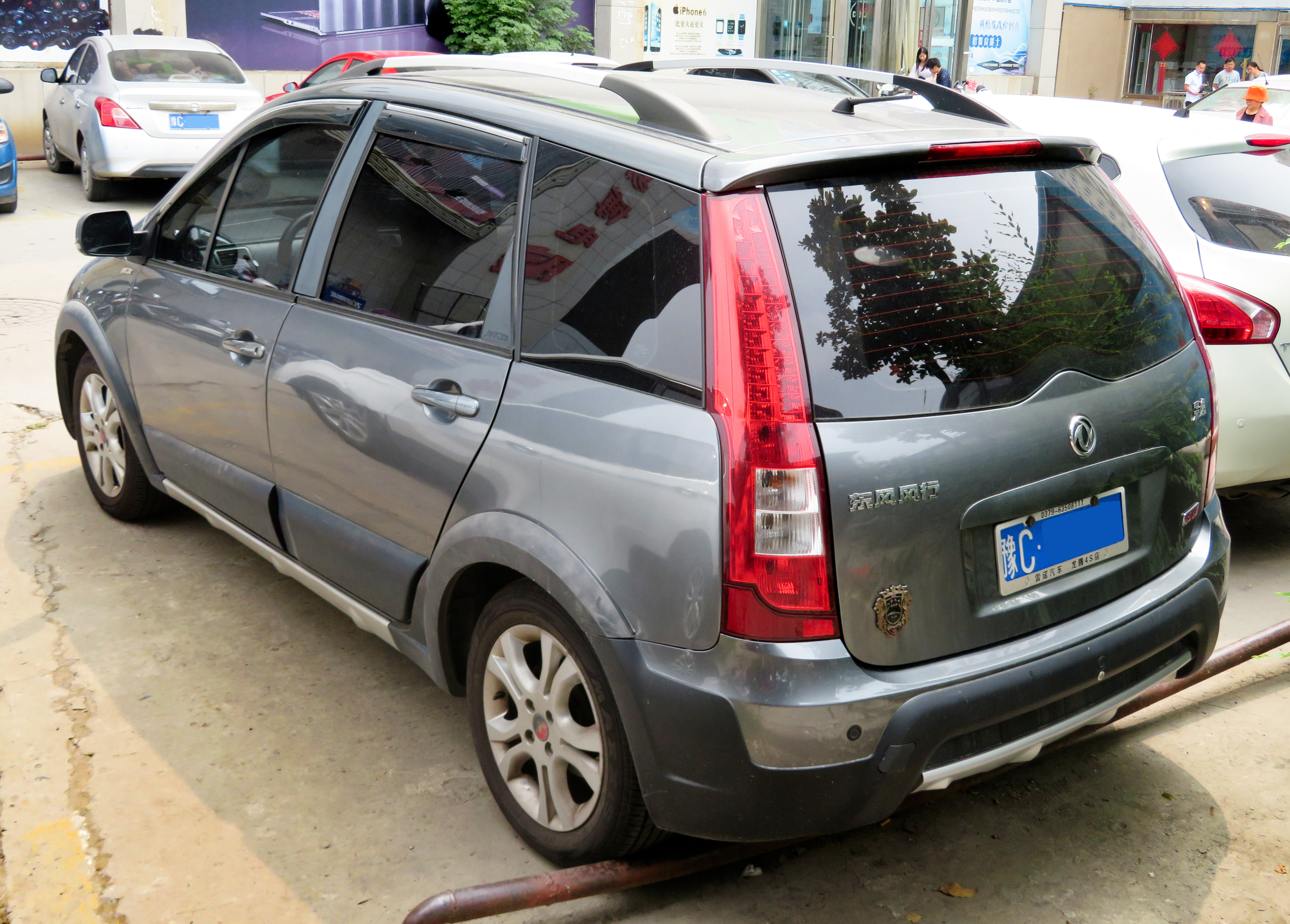
Dongfeng Fengxing Jingyi LV rear

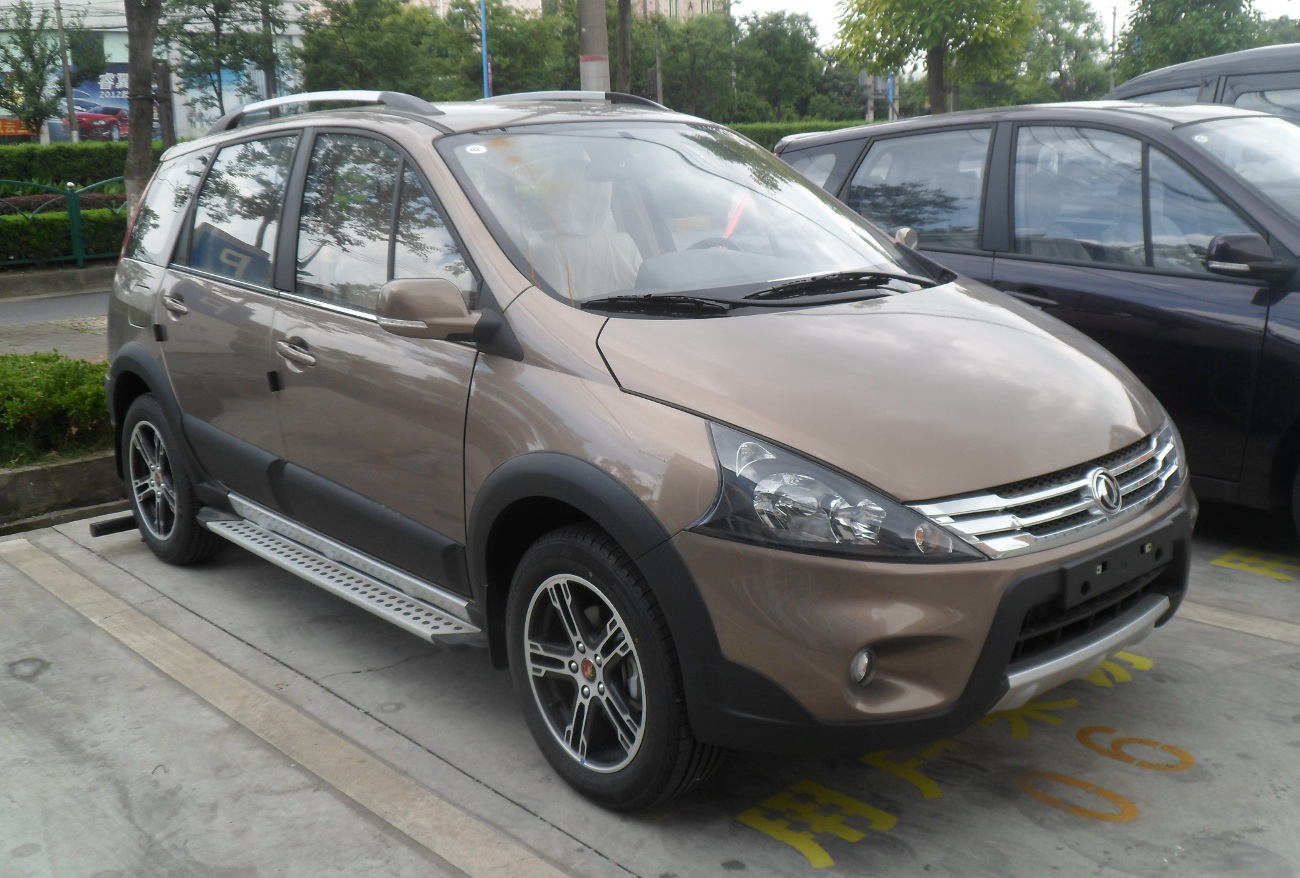
Dongfeng Fengxing Jingyi SUV front (pre-facelift)

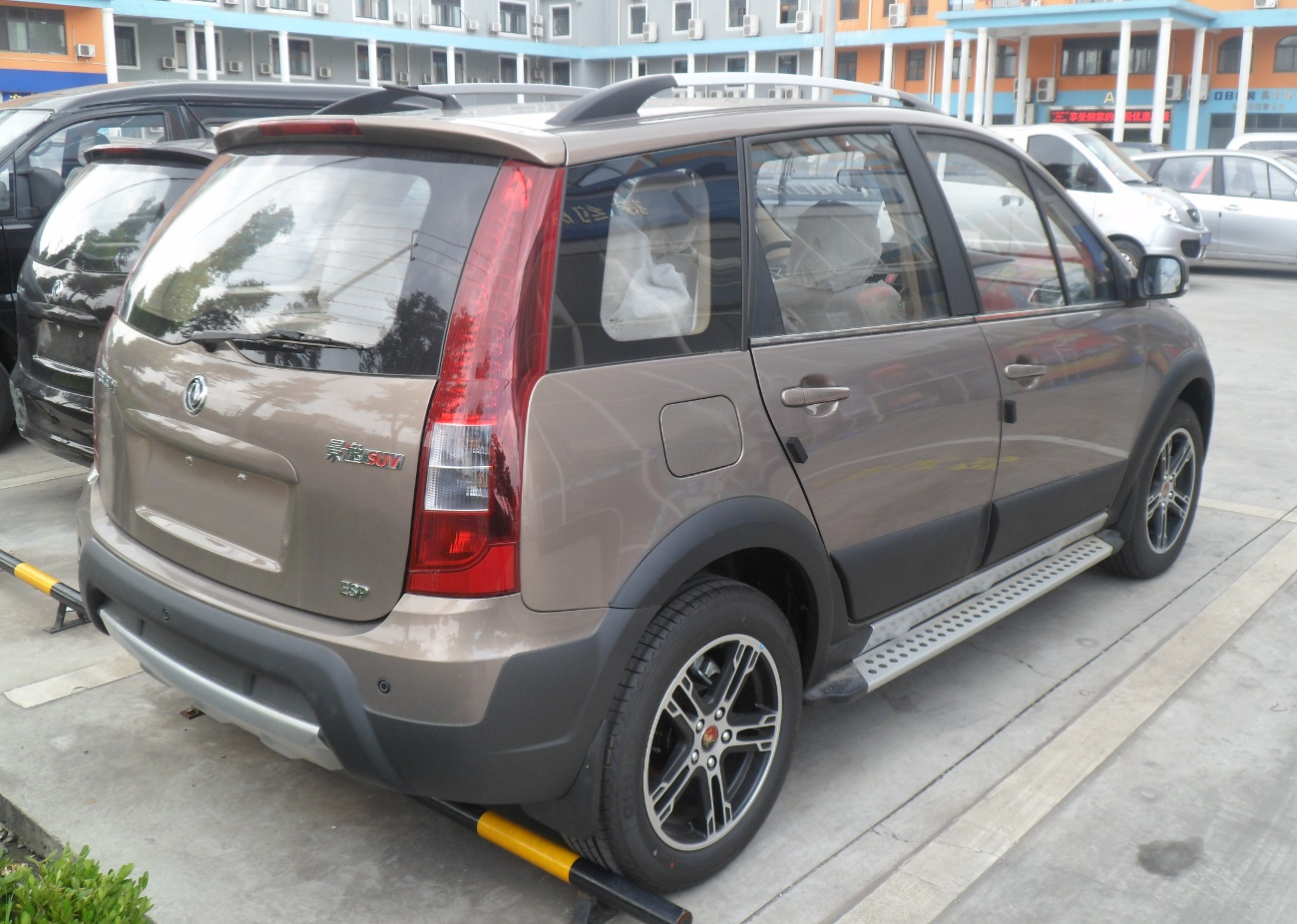
Dongfeng Fengxing Jingyi SUV rear (pre-facelift)

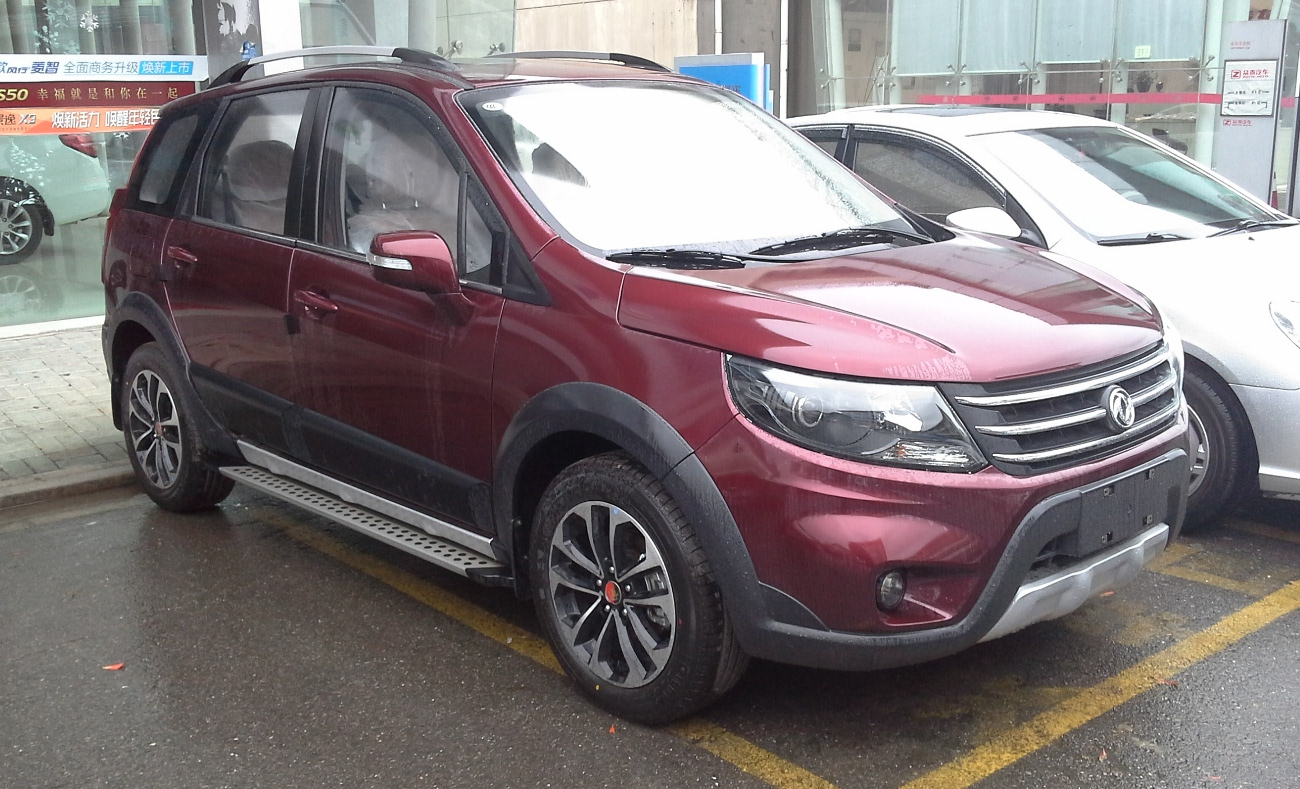
Dongfeng Fengxing Jingyi X5 front (facelift)

== Second generation (Forthing Jingyi X5 II) ==
Forthing Jingyi X5 II
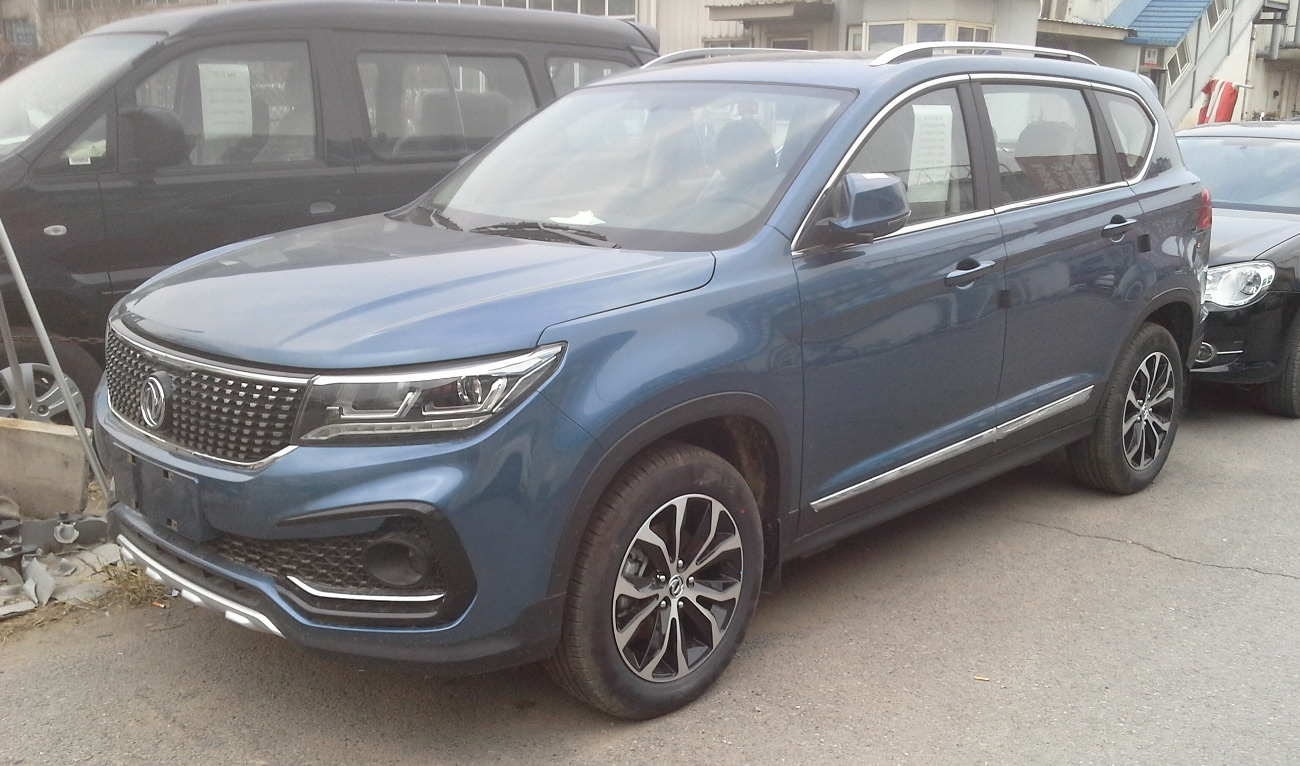

Overview
- Manufacturer: Forthing (Dongfeng Liuzhou Motor)
- Also called: Farda SX5 (Iran)
- Production: 2016–2021 2021 - present (Iran)
- Assembly: Liuzhou, China; Semnan, Iran (FMC); Borujerd, Iran (FMC)

Body and chassis
- Body style: 5–door SUV
- Layout: FF layout
- Related: Forthing T5

Powertrain
- Engine: 1.5 L 4A91 I4 Turbo (petrol); 1.6 L 4A92 I4 (petrol); 2.0 L DFMB20 I4 (petrol)
- Transmission: 5 speed manual CVT

Dimensions
- Wheelbase: 2,720 mm (107.1 in)
- Length: 4,545–4,554 mm (178.9–179.3 in)
- Width: 1,855 mm (73.0 in)
- Height: 1,716–1,719 mm (67.6–67.7 in)
- Kerb weight: 1,592–1,730 kg (3,510–3,814 lb)

Chronology
- Predecessor: Fengxing Jingyi X5 I

This second generation Forthing Jingyi X5 was launched as a for China, it officially debuted during the 2016 Guangzhou Auto Show in November 2016. The second generation Jingyi X5 is powered by the previously available 122hp 1.6 liter engine and a new 147hp 2.0 liter engine, while the 1.8 liter turbo engine option is cancelled. Gearbox options include a five-speed manual transmission or CVT. Prices ranges from 89,900 yuan to 122,900 yuan.

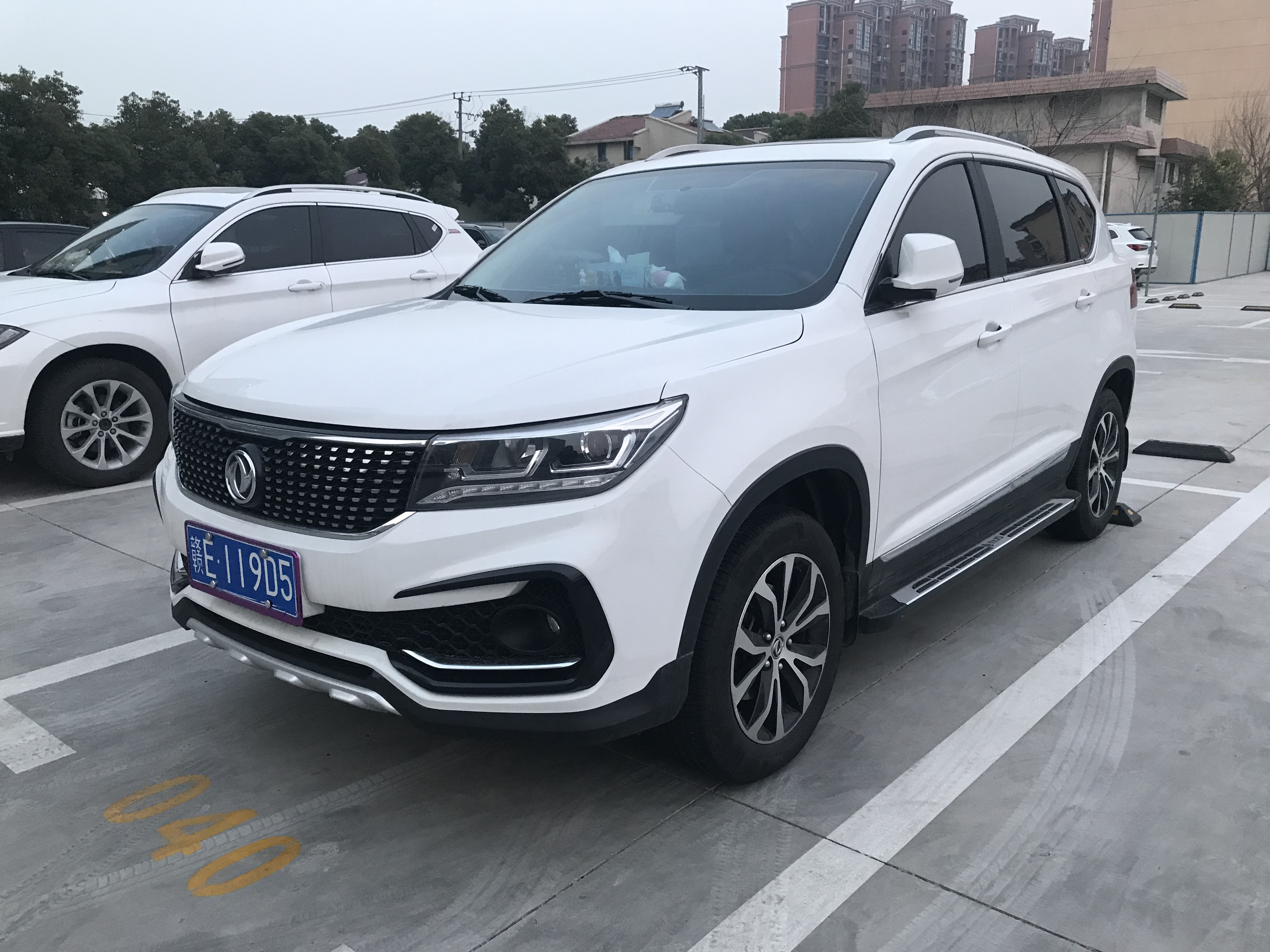
Forthing Jingyi X5 II front view

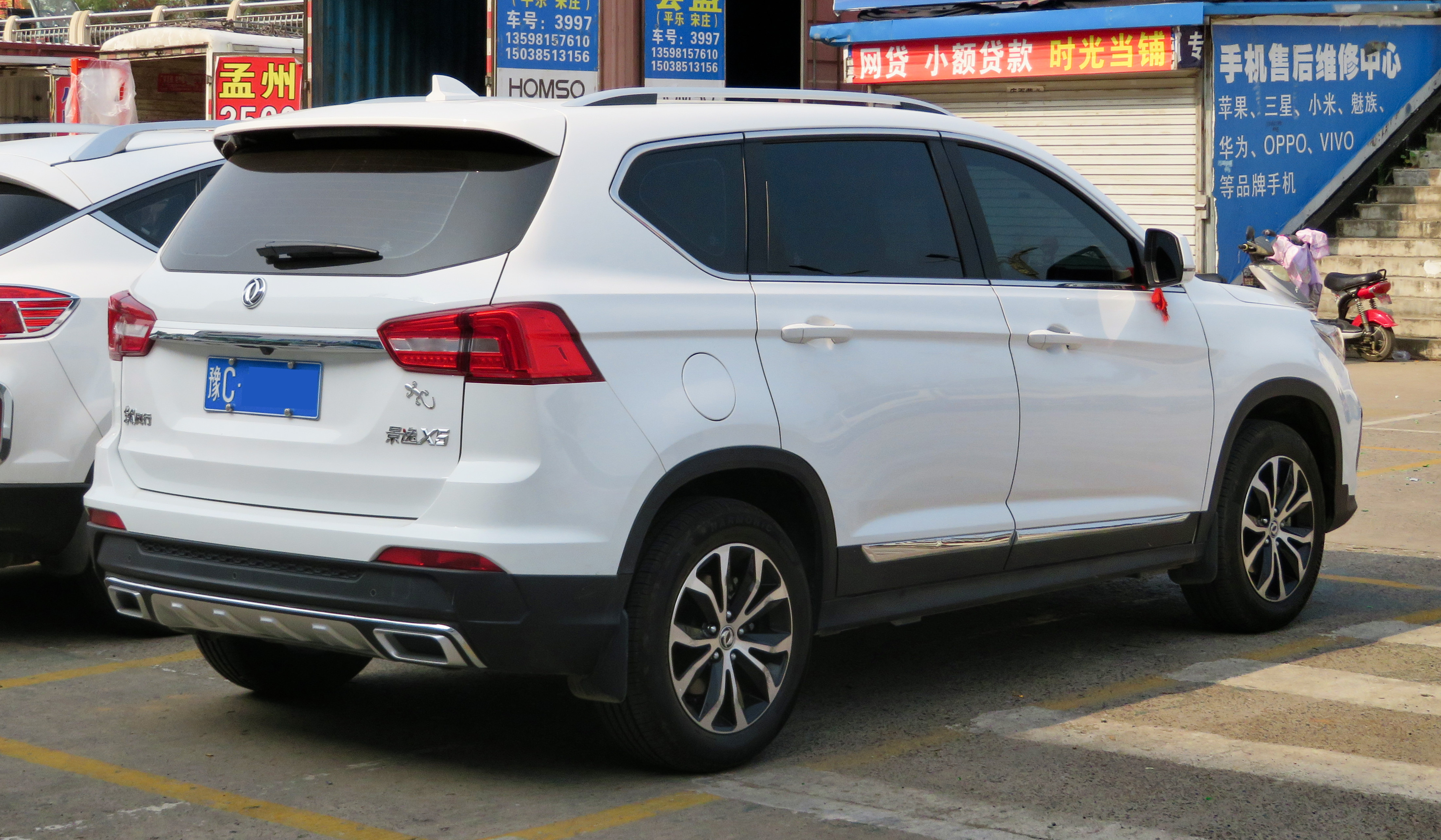
Forthing Jingyi X5 II rear view

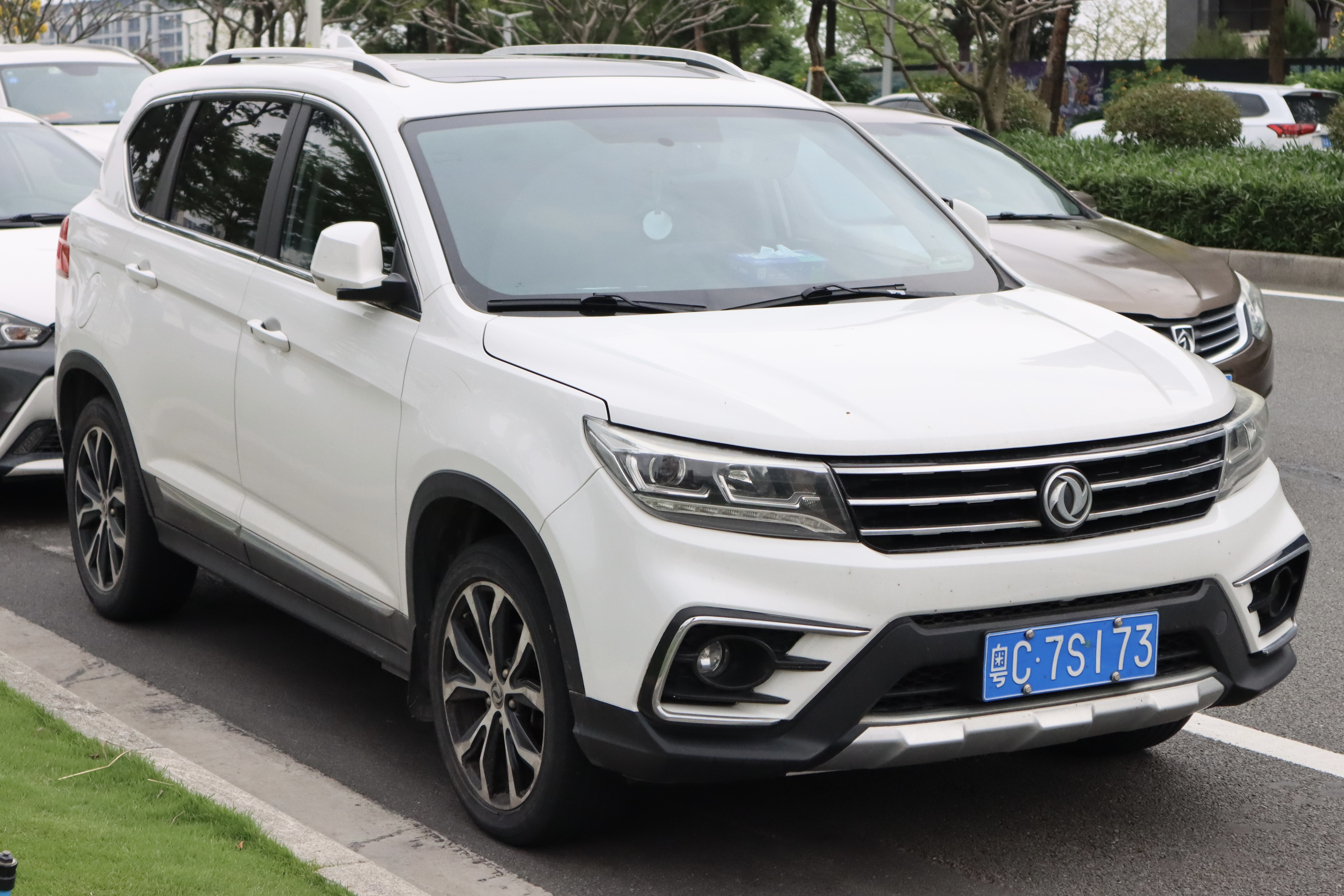
Forthing Jingyi X5 II facelift front view
