= Forthing S500 =

Forthing (Dongfeng Fengxing) S500
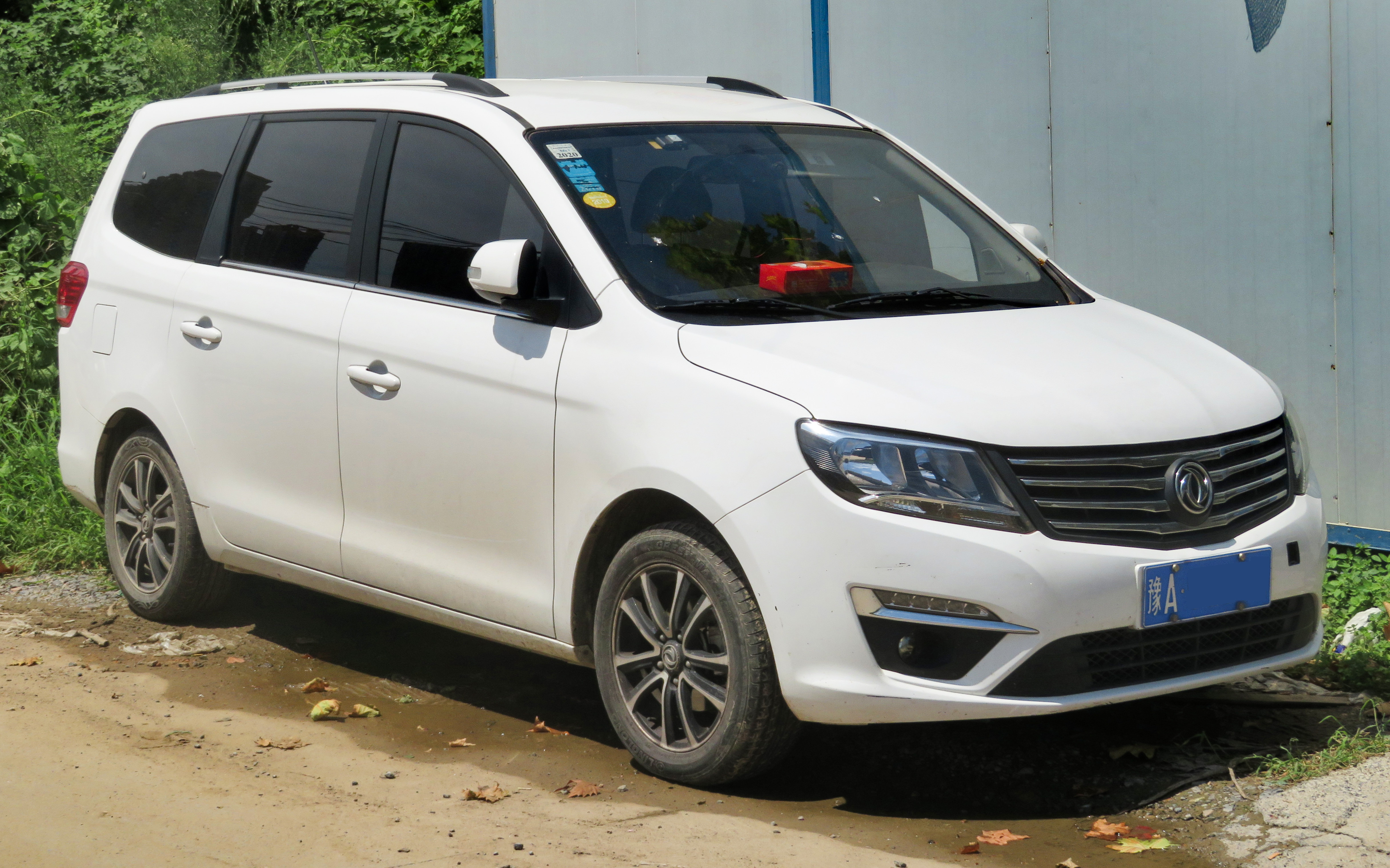

Overview
- Manufacturer: Forthing (Dongfeng Liuzhou Motor)
- Production: 2015–2017
- Assembly: Liuzhou, China

Body and chassis
- Class: Compact MPV
- Body style: 5-door station wagon
- Layout: Front-engine, front-wheel-drive
- Related: Jingyi X6; Fengxing SX6

Powertrain
- Engine: 1.6 L I4 (petrol); 1.5 L I4 (petrol)
- Transmission: 5-speed manual CVT

Dimensions
- Wheelbase: 2,750 mm (108.3 in)
- Length: 4,650 mm (183.1 in)
- Width: 1,820 mm (71.7 in)
- Height: 1,790 mm (70.5 in)

The Forthing S500 is a compact MPV produced by Dongfeng Liuzhou Motor under the Forthing (Dongfeng Fengxing) sub-brand.

== Overview ==
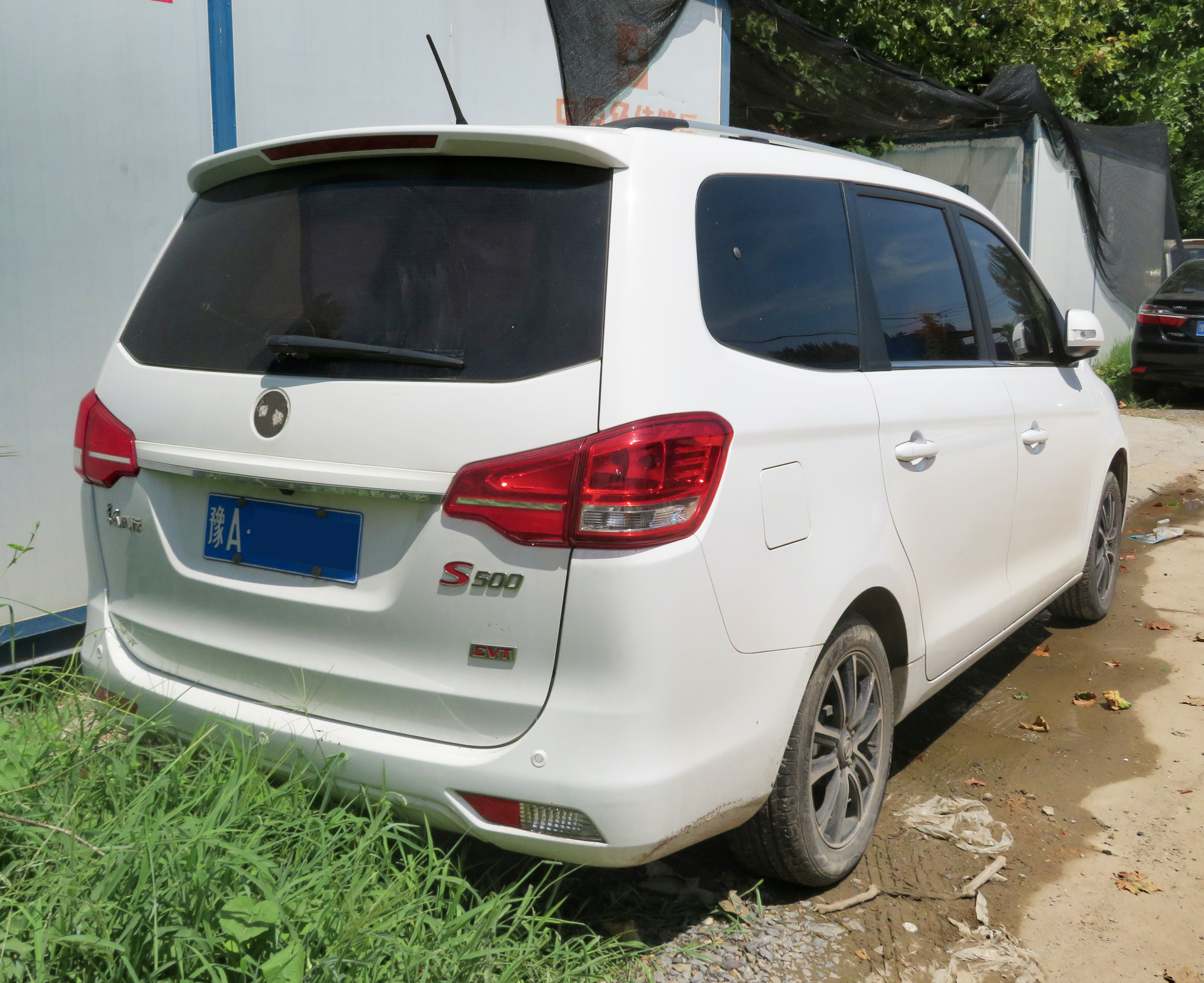
Dongfeng Fengxing S500 rear

The Fengxing S500 officially debuted in April 2015 at the 2015 Shanghai Auto Show.

The S500 is a seven-seater in a 2-2-3 seating configuration with prices ranging from 65,000 yuan to 99,900 yuan. The Fengxing S500 is powered by an inline-4 1.5 liter and 1.6 liter petrol engines, mated to a five-speed manual transmission or a CVT.
