= Forthing Jingyi X6 =

Chinese automobile

Dongfeng Fengxing Jingyi X6
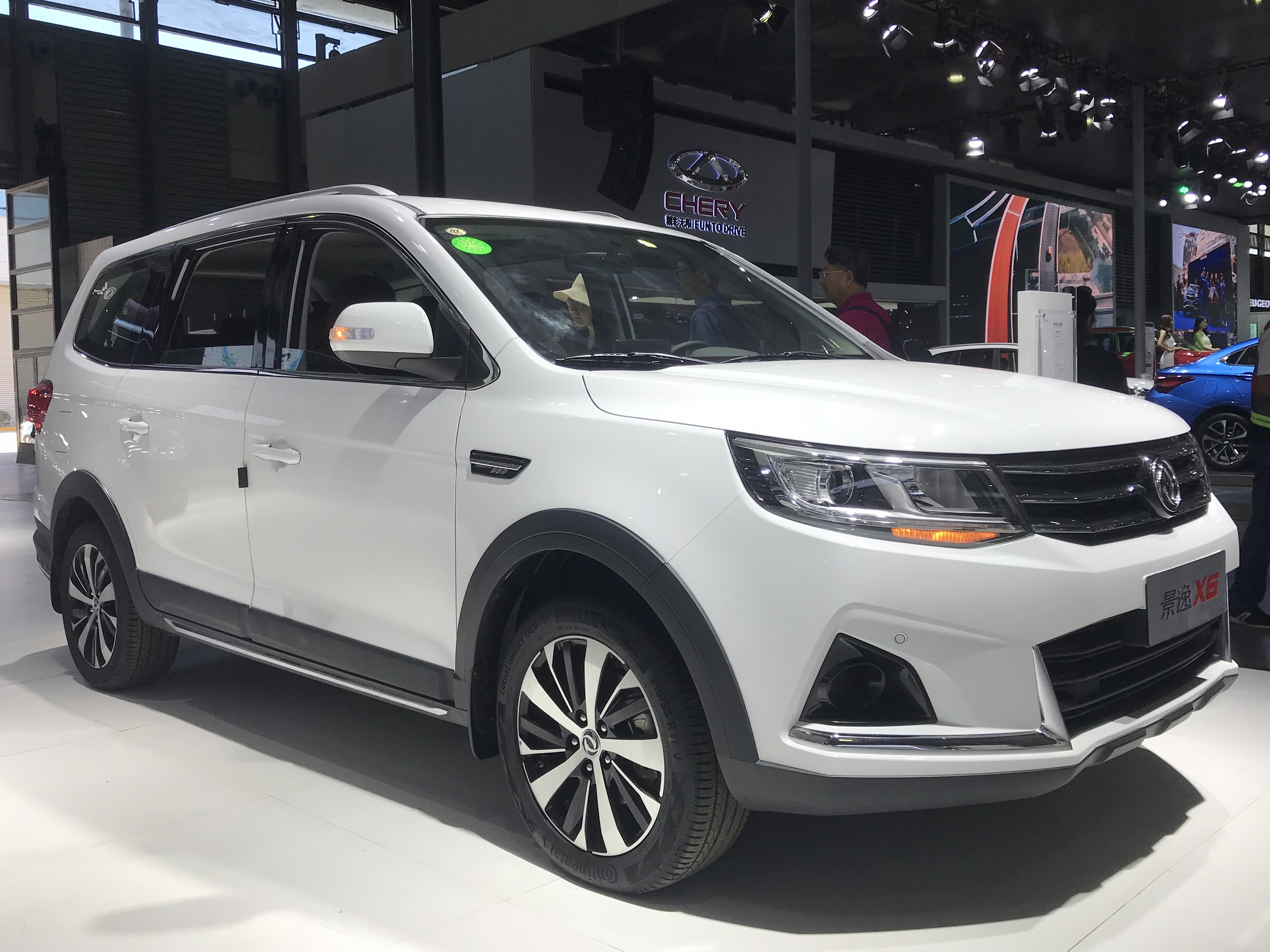

Overview
- Manufacturer: Dongfeng Liuzhou Motor
- Production: 2016—2017
- Assembly: Liuzhou, China

Body and chassis
- Class: Midsize CUV
- Body style: 5–door station wagon
- Layout: FF layout
- Related: Fengxing Jingyi X5; Dongfeng Fengxing SX6; Forthing S500

Powertrain
- Engine: 1.5 L turbo I4 (petrol); 2.0 L I4 (petrol)
- Transmission: 5 speed manual CVT

Dimensions
- Wheelbase: 2,750 mm (108.3 in)
- Length: 4,660 mm (183.5 in)
- Width: 1,810 mm (71.3 in)
- Height: 1,790 mm (70.5 in)

The Forthing Jingyi X6 is a Midsize Crossover sport utility vehicle positioned above the Forthing Jingyi X5 produced by Dongfeng Liuzhou Motor under the Forthing (Dongfeng Fengxing) sub-brand.

== Overview ==
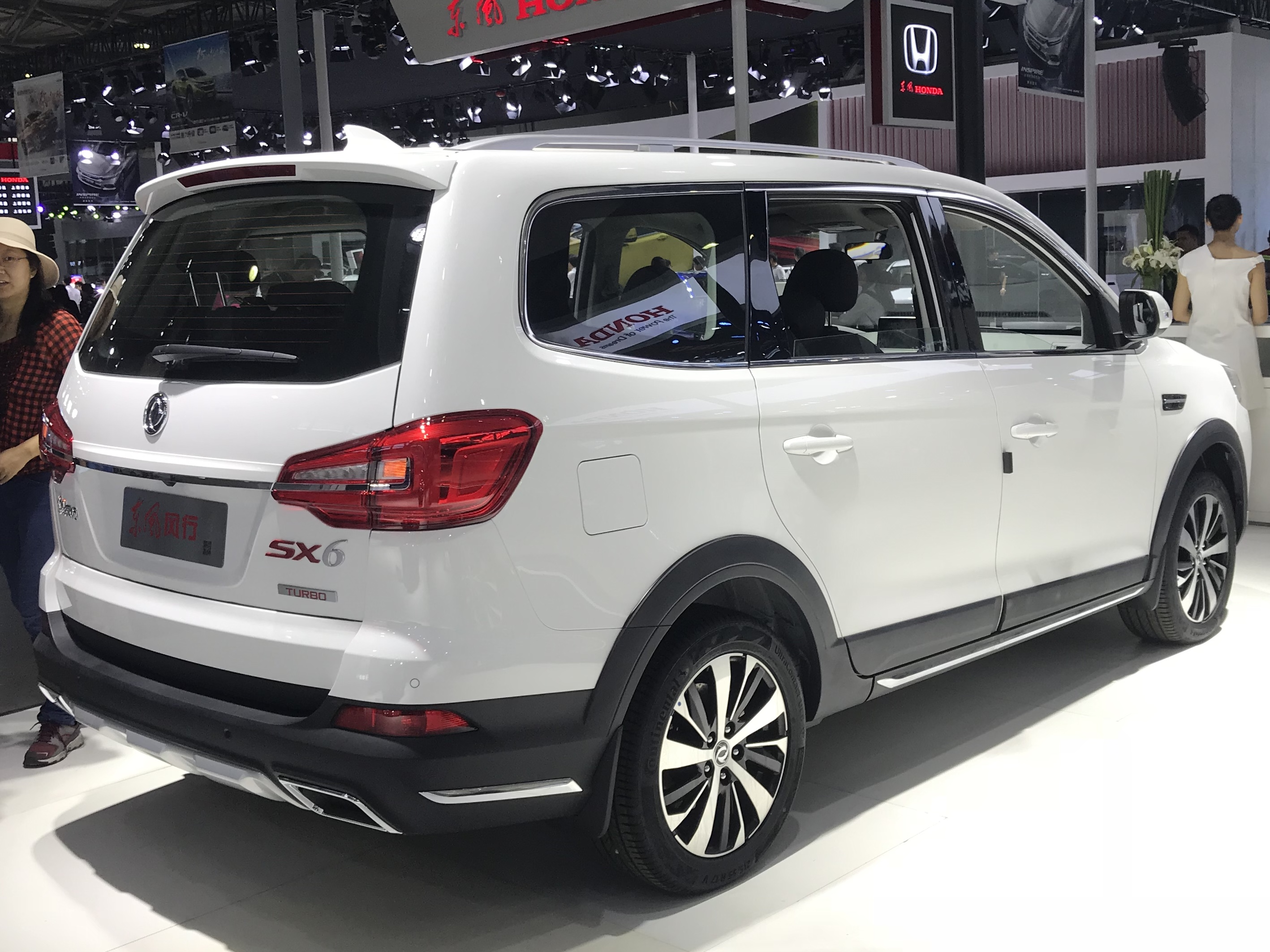
Fengxing Jingyi X6 rear

The Fengxing Jingyi X6 was offered as a more upmarket variant of the Fengxing SX6, featuring more powerful engines and a CVT as the automatic gearbox option. Being essentially a rebadged Dongfeng Fengxing SX6, the Fengxing Jingyi X6 is a seven-seater in a 2-2-3 seating configuration with prices ranging from 84,900 yuan to 109,900 yuan. Two engines are available for the Fengxing Jingyi X6, including a 1.5 liter inline-4 turbo engine producing 150hp and 200nm, and a 2.0 liter inline-4 engine producing 147hp and 200nm. The model was discontinued with 2017 being its last model year due to slow sales.
