= Forthing Lingzhi =

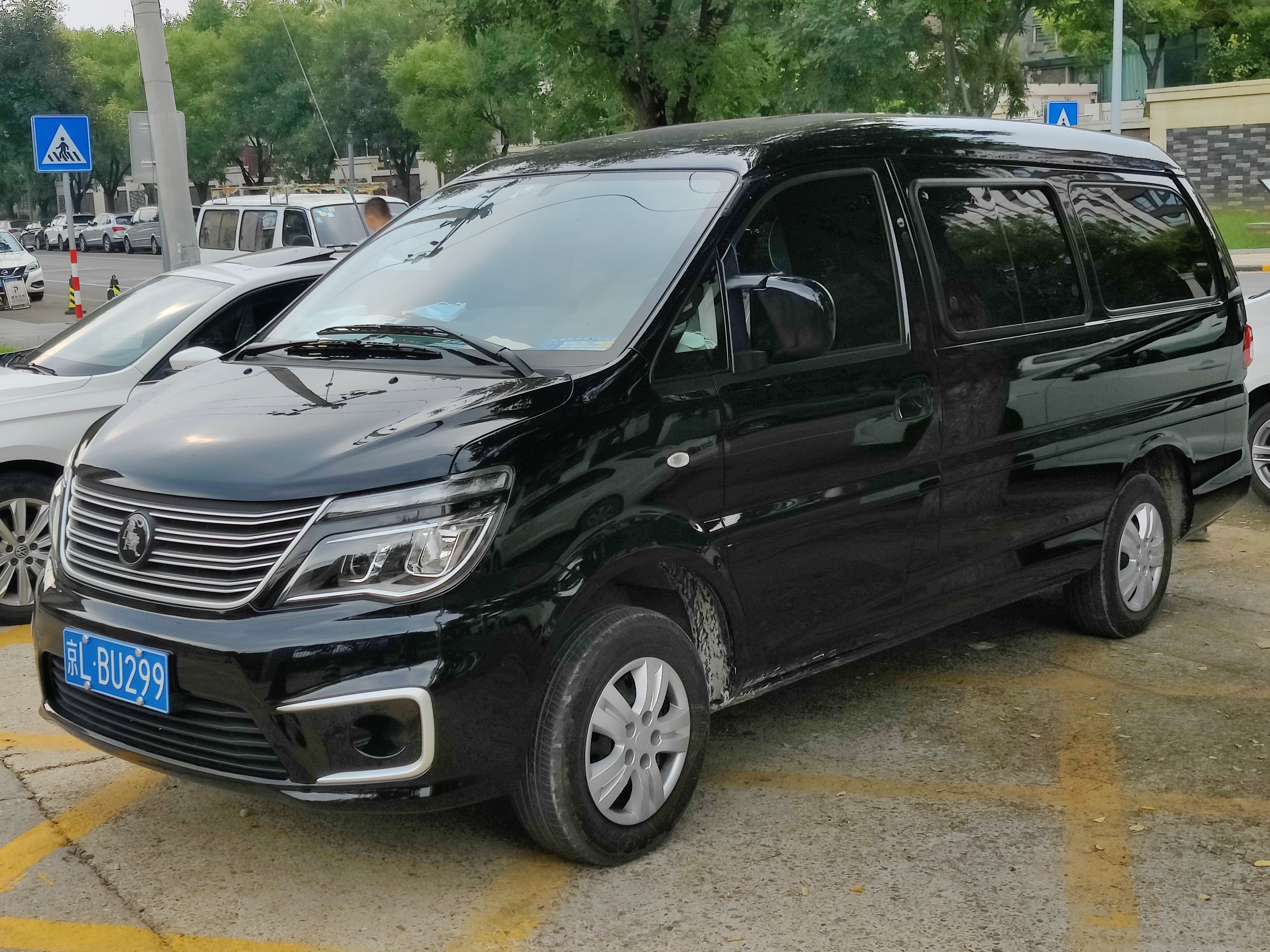

Overview
- Also called: Dongfeng Fengxing Lingzhi M5/M5L; Dongfeng Fengxing Lingzhi M3/M3L; Dongfeng Fengxing Lingzhi V3/V3L; Evolute i-Van (Russia)
- Production: 2001–present
- Assembly: Liuzhou, China

Body and chassis
- Class: MPV (M)
- Body style: 4-door van
- Layout: Front engine, rear-wheel-drive layout
- Related: Mitsubishi Space Gear

Powertrain
- Engine: Petrol: 1.3 L 4G13T I4 (turbo); 1.5 L 4G15S I4; 1.6 L 4G18S I4; 2.0 L 4G63 I4 (petrol); 2.0 L DFMB20 I4; 2.4 L 4G64 I4; Diesel: 1.9 L D19 I4 (turbo-diesel)
- Transmission: 5/6-speed manual 4 speed automatic

Dimensions
- Wheelbase: 2,800–3,000 mm (110.2–118.1 in)
- Length: 4,680–5,145 mm (184.3–202.6 in)
- Width: 1,720 mm (67.7 in)
- Height: 1,940–1,960 mm (76.4–77.2 in)
- Curb weight: 1,510–1,730 kg (3,330–3,810 lb)

The Forthing Lingzhi is a range of MPVs produced by Dongfeng Liuzhou Motor under the Forthing (Dongfeng Fengxing) sub-brand. It is the first product of the Forthing brand by Dongfeng Liuzhou Motor.

== Overview ==
At launch, the Forthing Lingzhi was essentially a rebadged fourth generation Mitsubishi Delica or the Mitsubishi Delica Space Gear. The Delica platform was acquired from Taiwan’s China Motor Corporation, a partner of Mitsubishi Motors. Therefore, the initial facelifts from Dongfeng Liuzhou were identical to the Taiwanese China Motor Corporation built Mitsubishi Space Gear. After the China Motor Corporation built Mitsubishi Space Gears were discontinued in Taiwan, Dongfeng Liuzhou continued the production in China and conducted their own facelifts and development of the model.

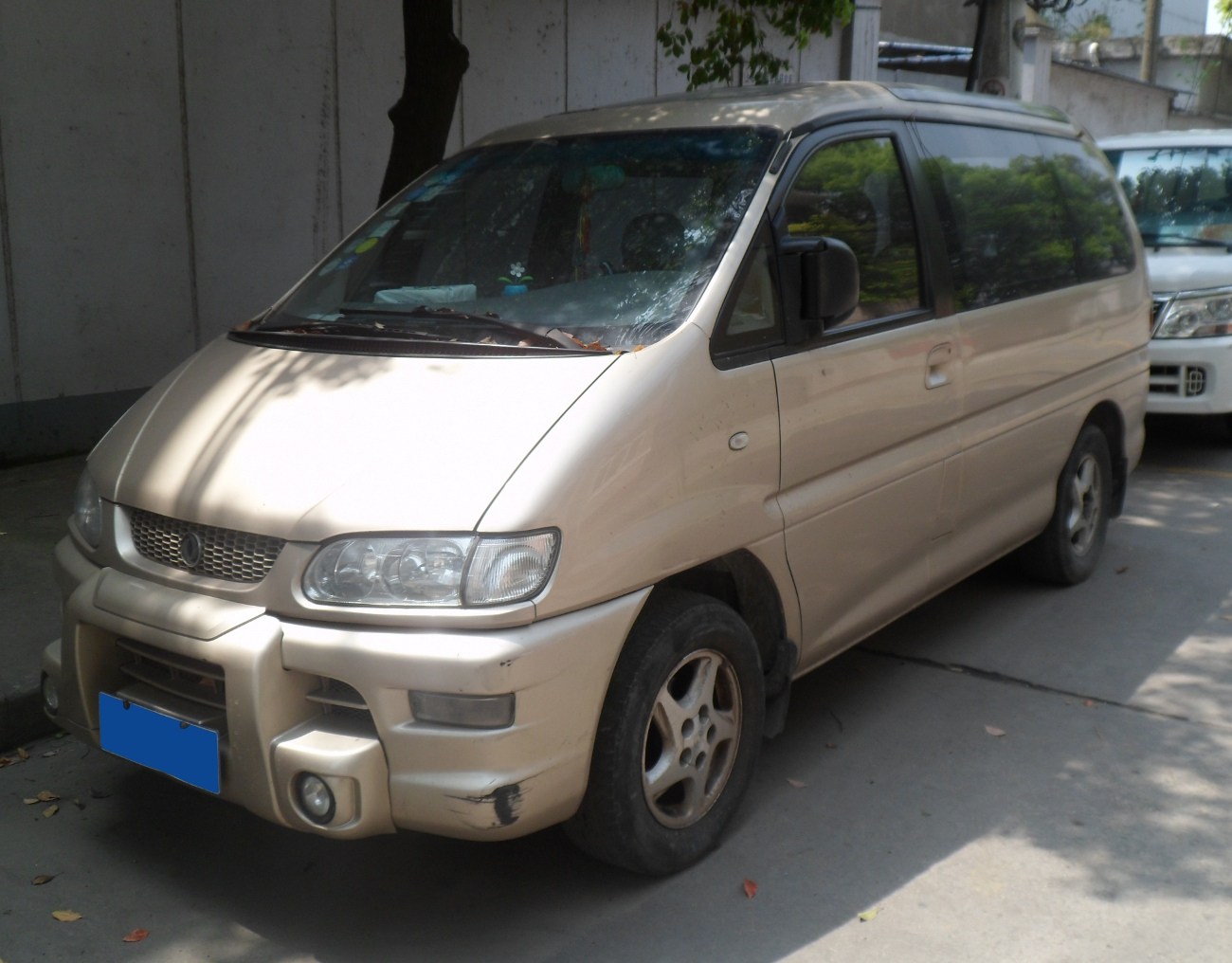
Original Dongfeng Fengxing Lingzhi

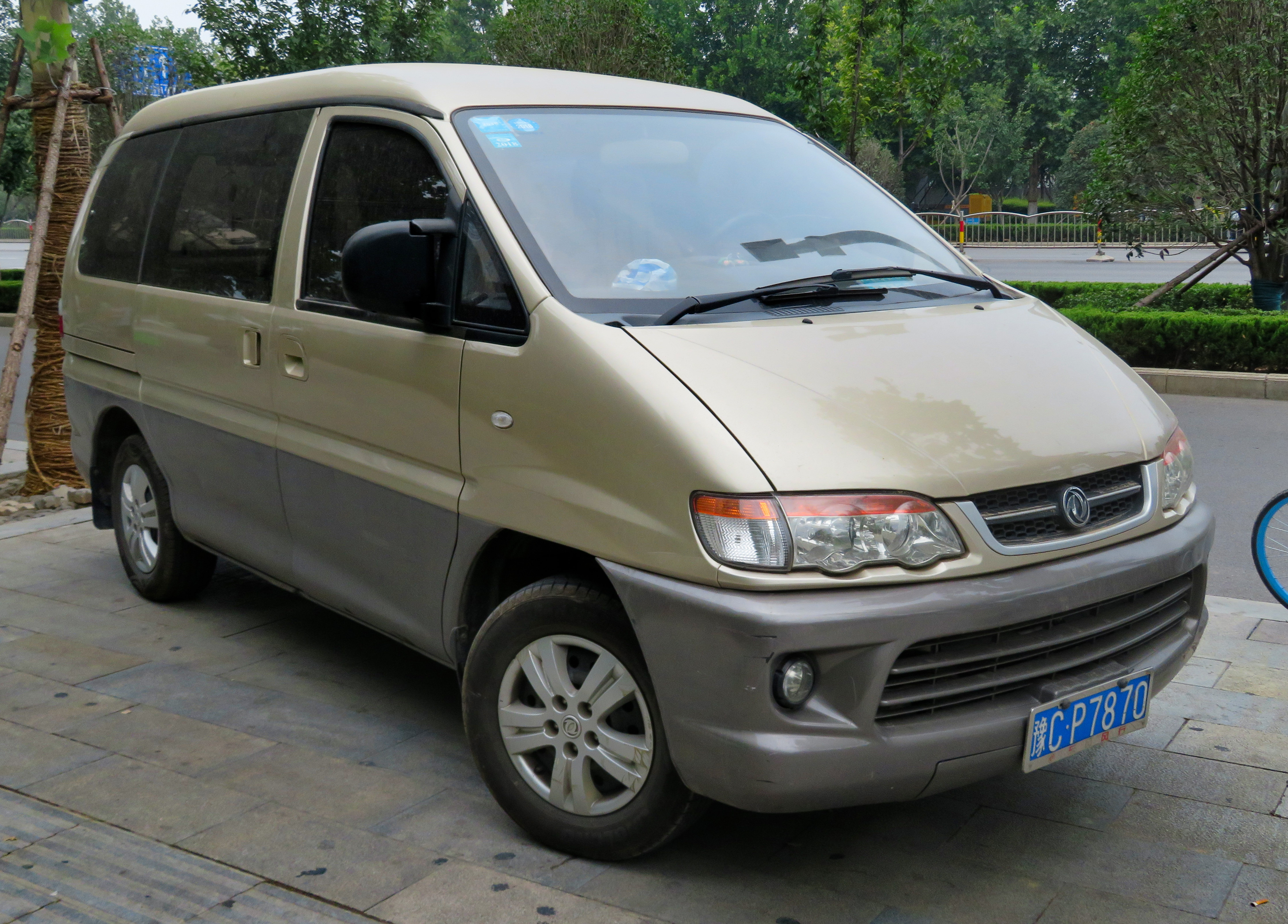
First facelift

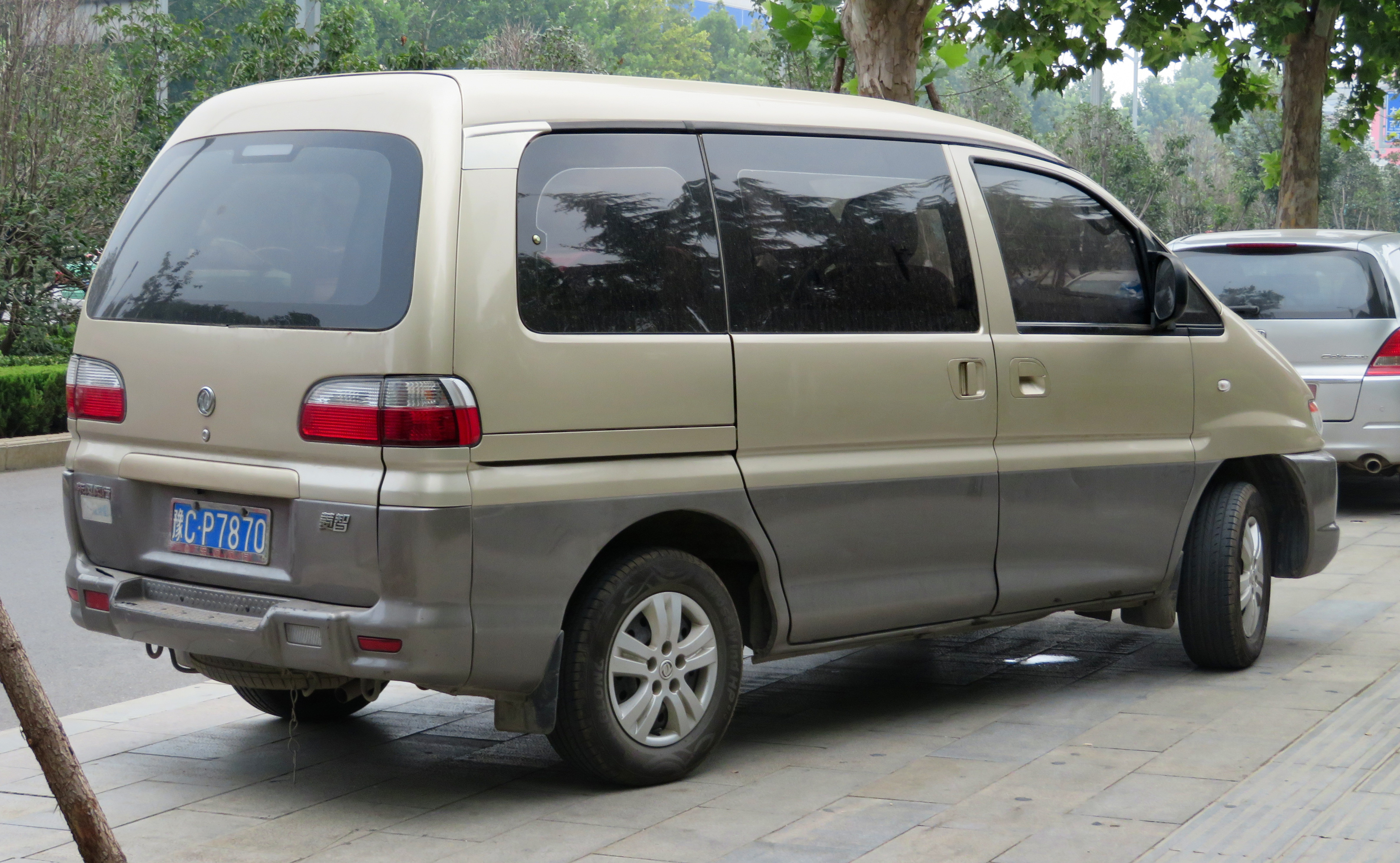
First facelift

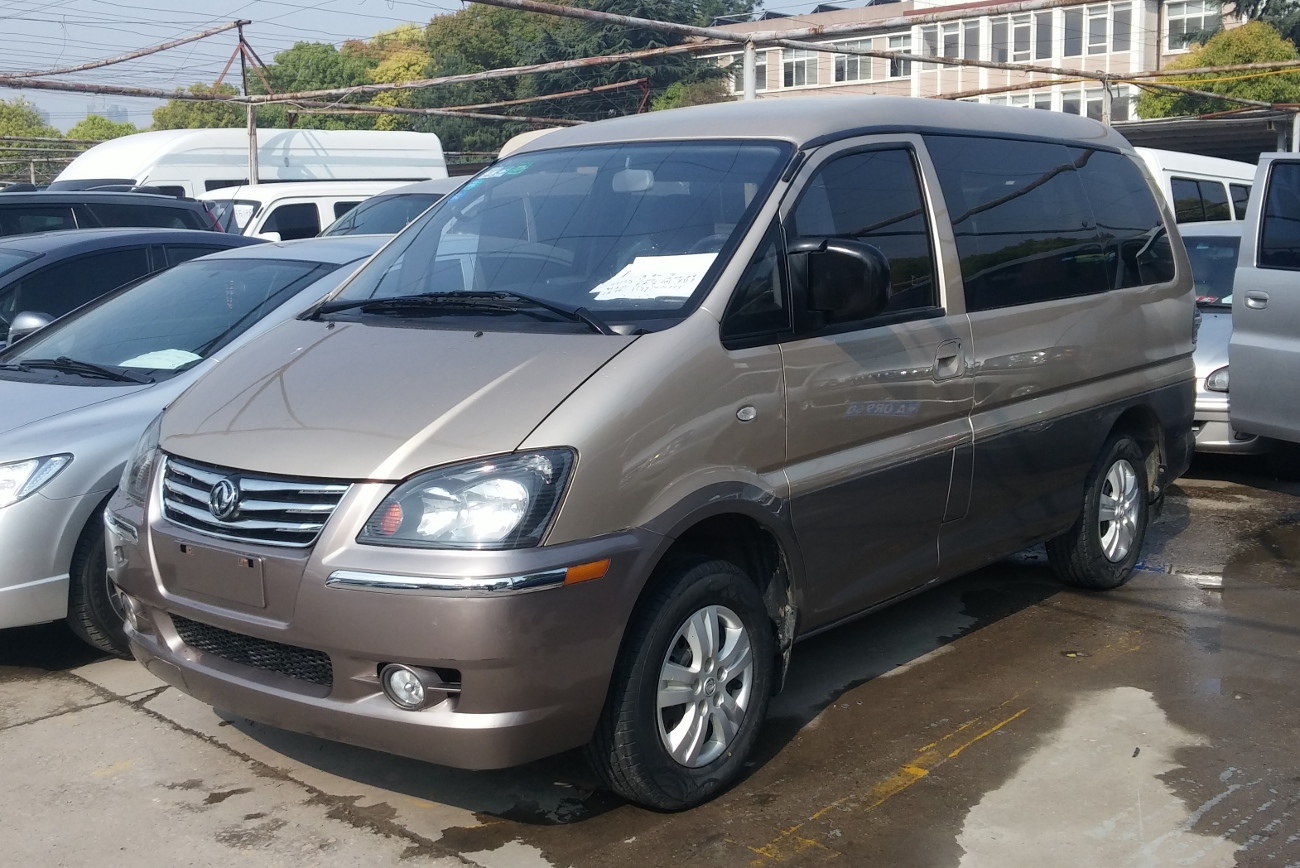
Second facelift

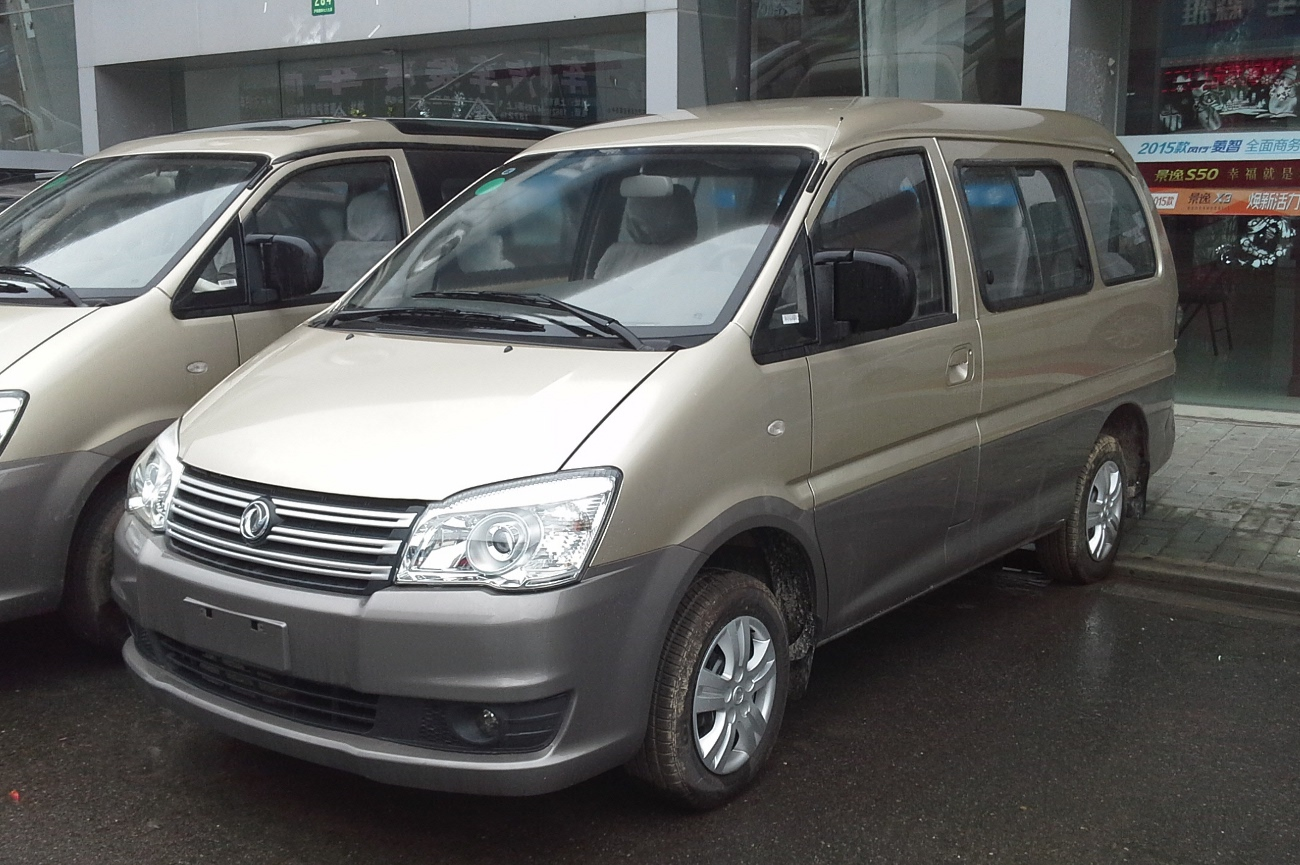
Third facelift (M3)

Three trim levels were developed after the facelift by Dongfeng Liuzhou was conducted, including the Lingzhi M5, M3, and V3, which targets different groups of consumers and were priced differently. The M5 is the premium version, featuring a restyled front DRG and restyled tail lamps with prices ranging from 77,900 yuan to 98,900 yuan. The M3 being the basic passenger version sharing the same front DRG design and same tail lamps with the V3 but with clear DLO with prices ranging from 55,900 yuan to 71,900 yuan. The V3 is the utility cargo version with a sealed cargo area and being the most affordable of the three trim levels with prices ranging from 55,900 yuan to 66,900 yuan. Each trim is available with a long wheelbase version called the Lingzhi M5L, M3L, and V3L respectively all sharing the same tail lamp design.

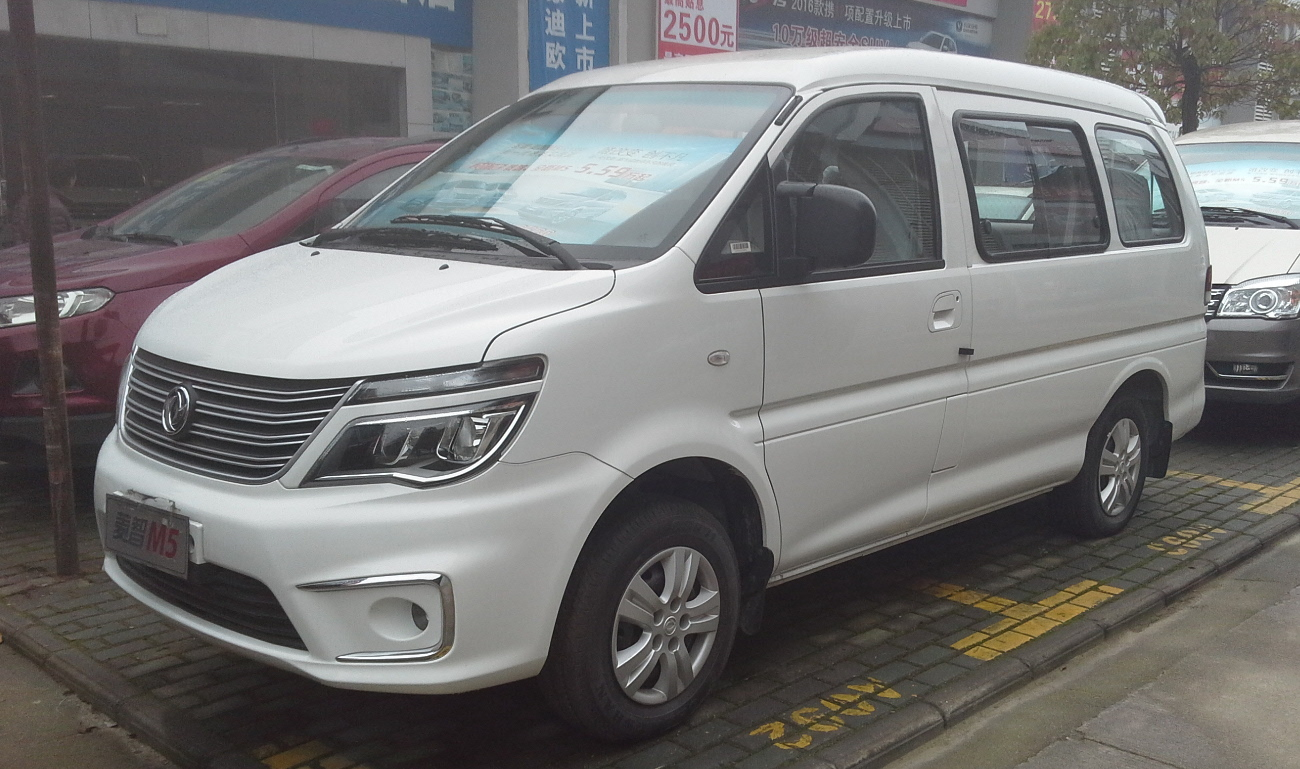
Dongfeng Fengxing Lingzhi M5 (front)

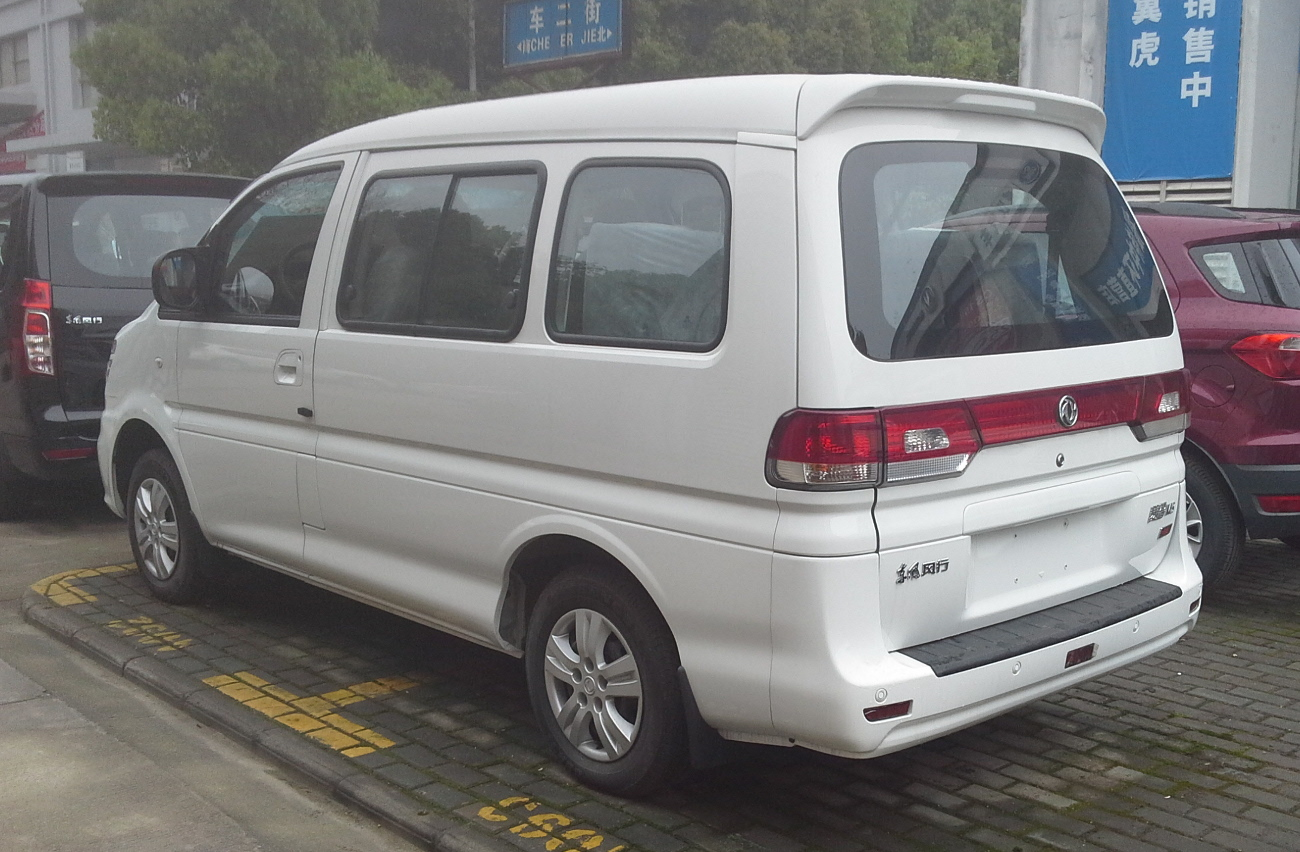
Dongfeng Fengxing Lingzhi M5 (rear)
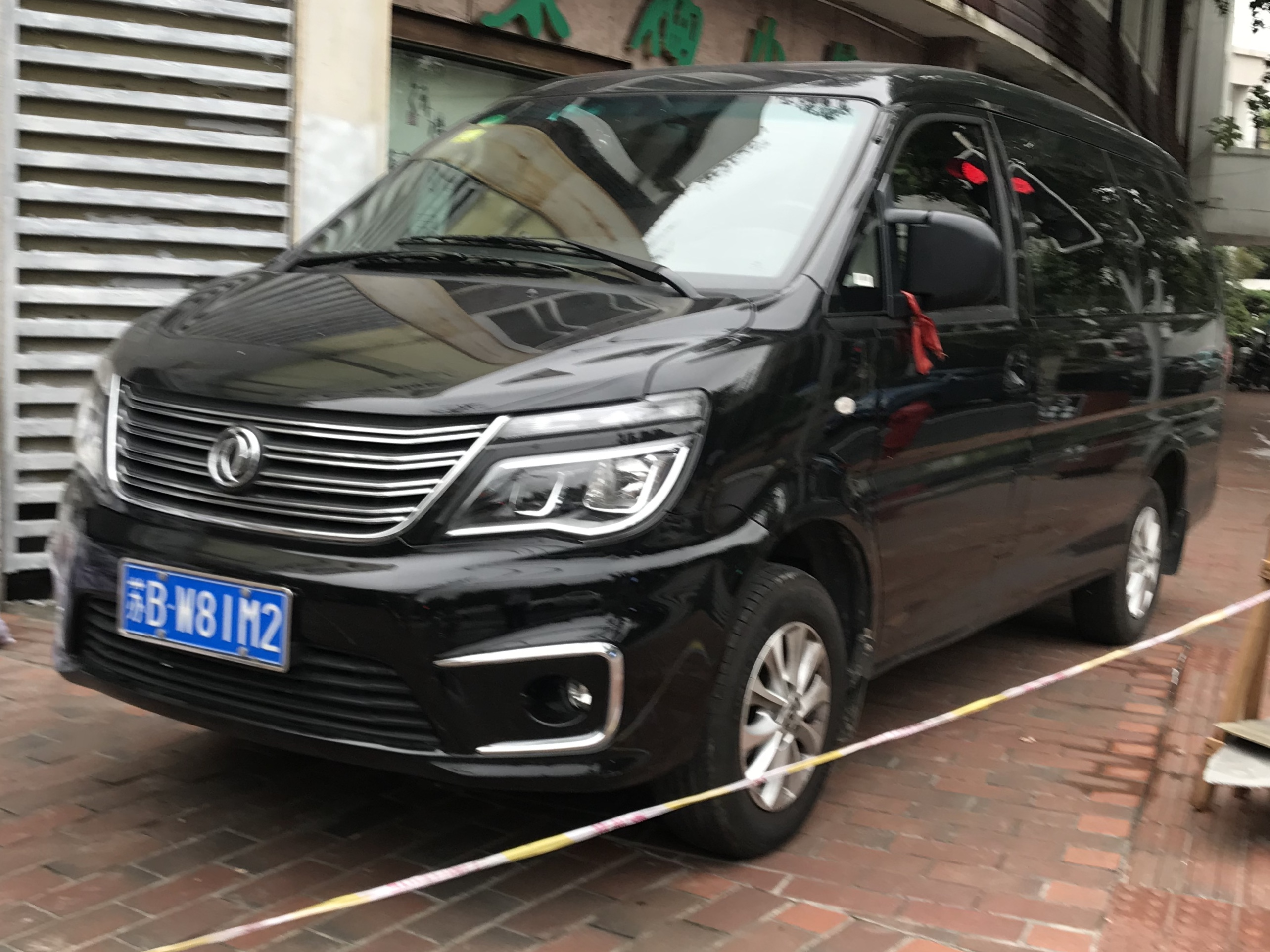
Dongfeng Fengxing Lingzhi M5L (front)

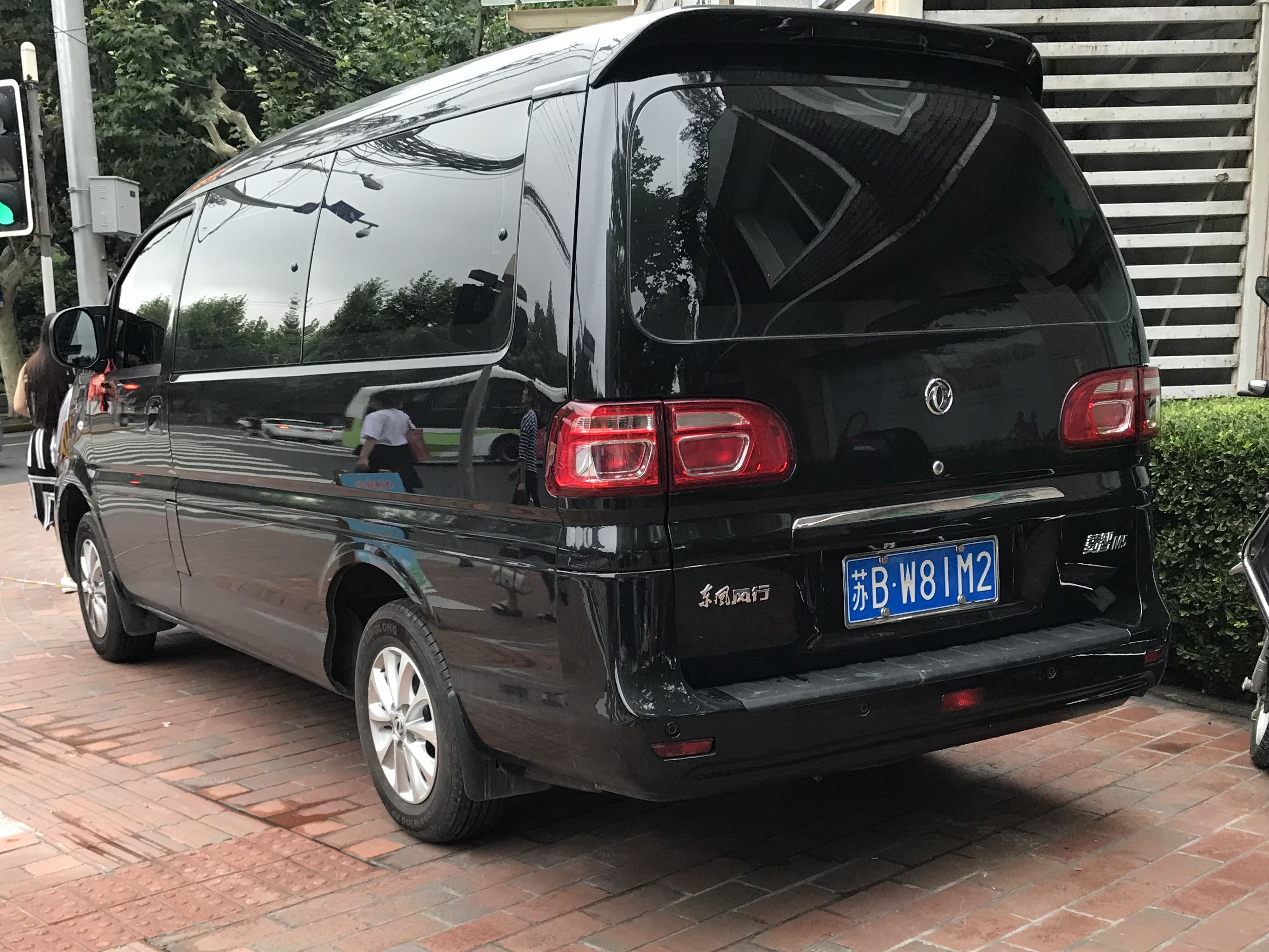
Dongfeng Fengxing Lingzhi M5L (rear)

A facelift was launched in 2020 featuring redesigned front bumper and grilles. The engine of the post-facelift model is a 1.6-liter naturally aspirated engine with a 5-speed manual transmission MT and a newly added 2.0-liter engine producing 122hp and 200Nm mated to a 6-speed manual transmission.

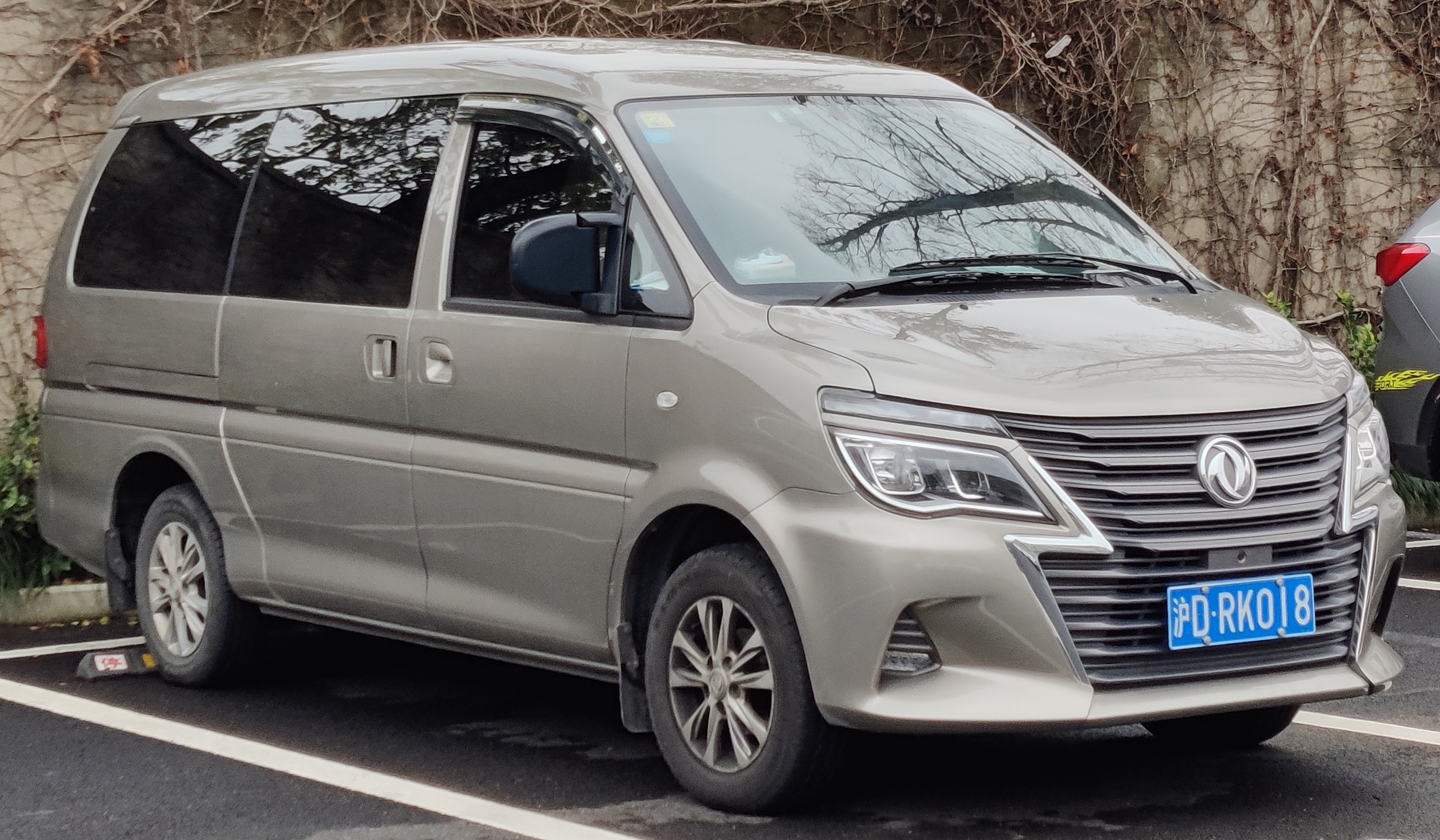
2020 Dongfeng Fengxing Lingzhi M5

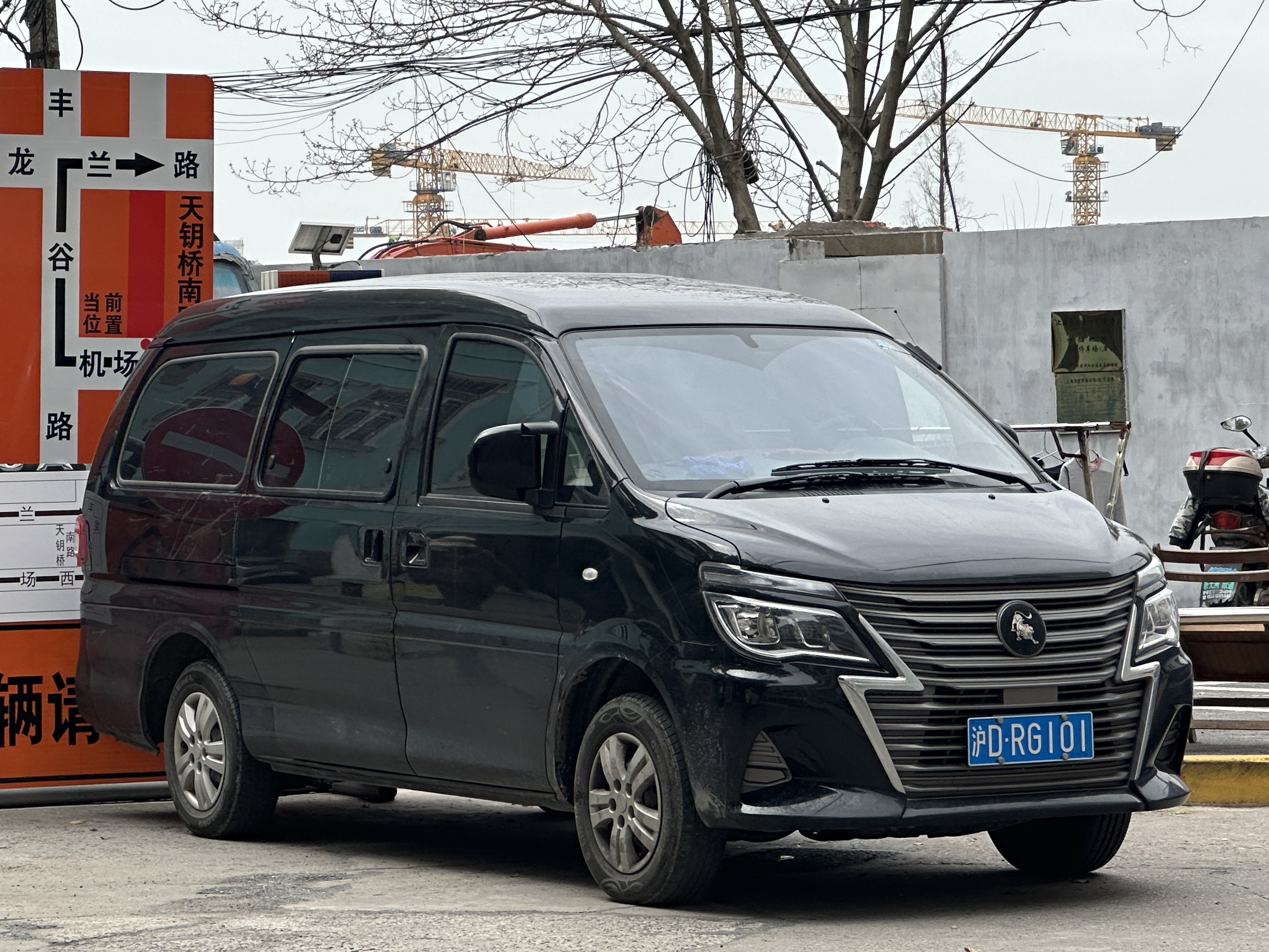
2023 Forthing Lingzhi M5 with the updated badge
