= Dongfeng Liuzhou Motor =

Chinese automobile manufacturer

Dongfeng Liuzhou Automobile Co., Ltd.
- Native name: Liuzhou Agricultural Machinery Factory
- Type: Subsidiary
- Industry: Automotive; Industrial vehicles
- Predecessors: Liuzhou Automobile Co., Ltd.
- Founded: 6 October 1954; 72 years ago
- Headquarters: Liuzhou, China
- Area served: China
- Products: Automobiles, Trucks, commercial vehicles, auto parts
- Brands: Forthing; Chenglong
- Owners: Dongfeng Motor Group (75%); Liuzhou Industrial Shareholding Co Ltd. (25%)
- Number of employees: 7,000
- Website: http://www.dflzm.com.cn/

Dongfeng Liuzhou Motor Co., Ltd. is a subsidiary of Dongfeng Motor Group, located in the city of Liuzhou, Guangxi, China.

Dongfeng Liuzhou Motor was founded in 1954 and entered the field of automobile production in 1969. It manufactures passenger cars sold in China under the brand Dongfeng Forthing (Fengxing, Chinese: 东风风行); these include the Jingyi small multi-purpose vehicle also known as Joyear, the Jingyi S50 sedan and the S500 large multi-purpose vehicle, as well as two types of vans, the Ling Zhi (also known as Future) and the CM7. Some of these models are also sold in Latin American markets such as Chile and Peru under the brands Dongfeng, DFM or DFLZ.

Dongfeng Liuzhou also produces trucks under the brands Dongfeng Chenglong (Chinese: 东风乘龙), BaLong and LongKa.

== Products ==
The following vehicles are currently available.

Forthing (Fengxing) series:

- Fengxing T5/ Fengxing T5L compact crossover
- Fengxing T5 EVO compact crossover
- Fengxing SX6 mid-size crossover/ Fengxing SX6 EV electric mid-size crossover
- Fengxing S500 compact MPV/ Fengxing S500 EV electric compact MPV
- Fengxing F600 MPV
- Fengxing CM7 MPV
- Forthing Yacht MPV
- Forthing U-Tour V9 MPV

Lingzhi vans:

- Lingzhi V3 panel van
- Lingzhi M3 MPV
- Lingzhi M5 MPV/ M5 EV electric MPV

Joyear (Jingyi) series:

- Jingyi S50 compact sedan/ Jingyi S50 EV electric compact sedan
- Jingyi X3 subcompact crossover
- Jingyi X5 compact crossover
- Jingyi X6 mid-size crossover

== Product gallery ==
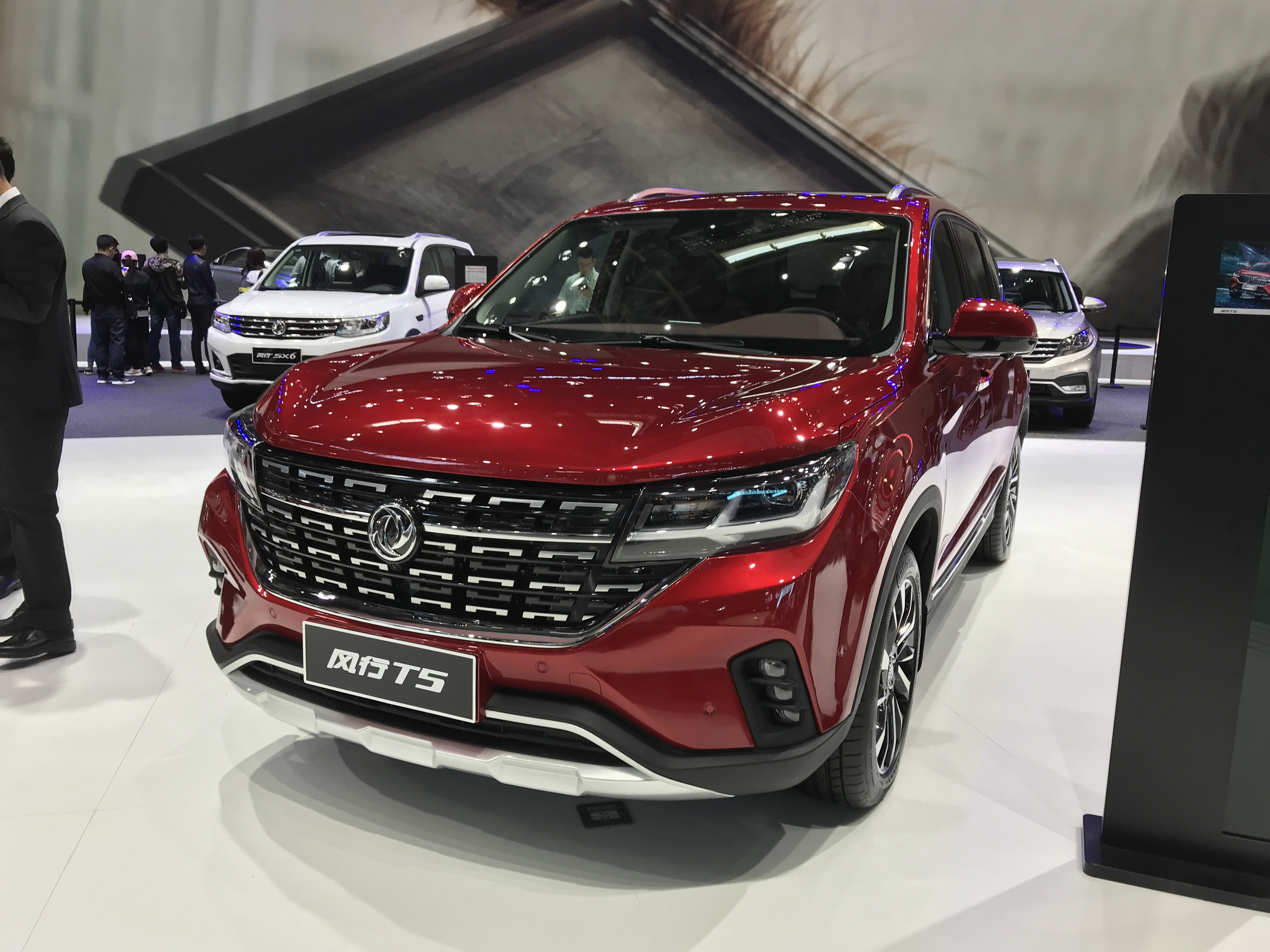
Dongfeng Fengxing T5

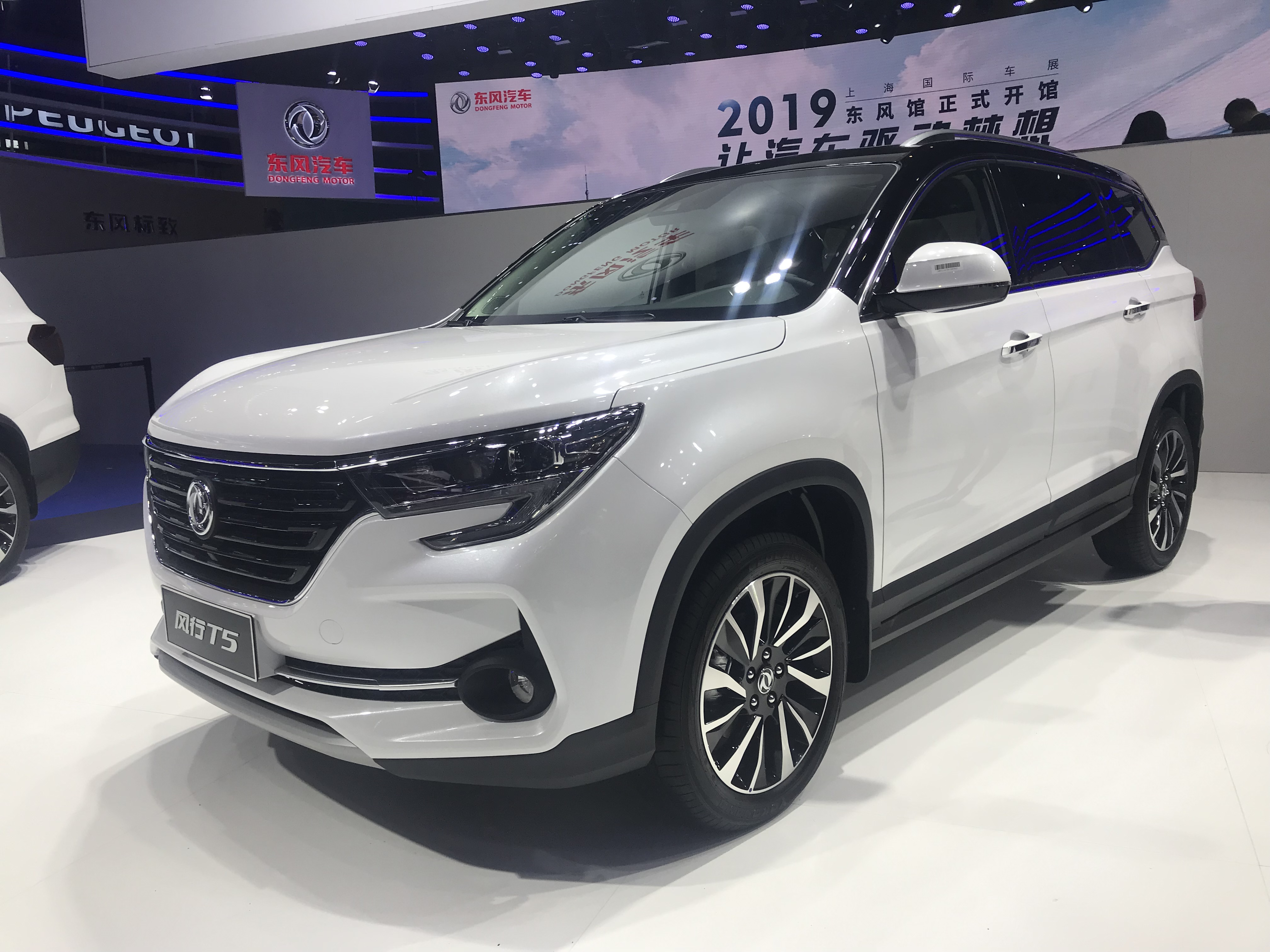
Dongfeng Fengxing T5 (2019 National Standard VI version)

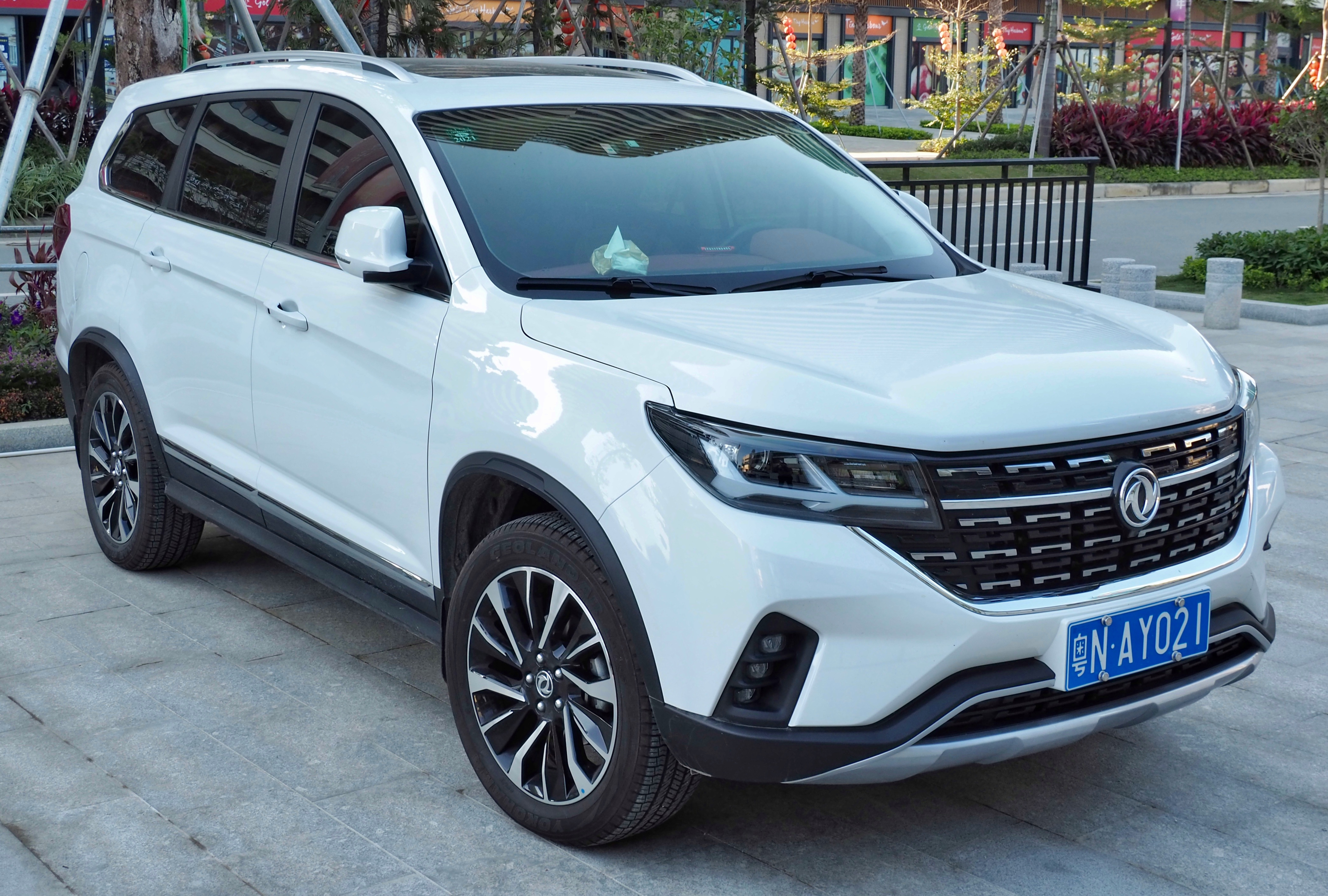
Dongfeng Fengxing T5L

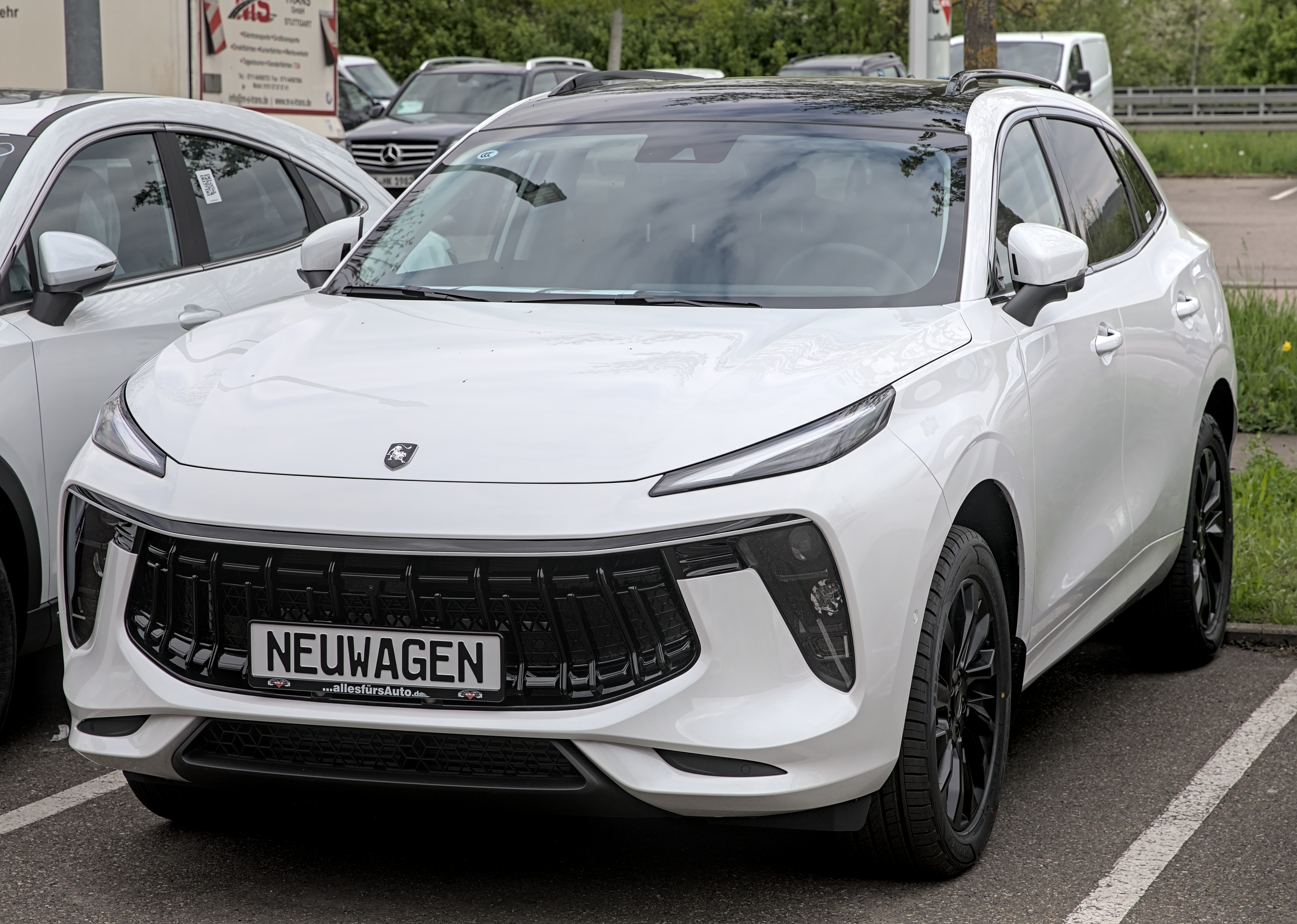
Forthing T5 EVO

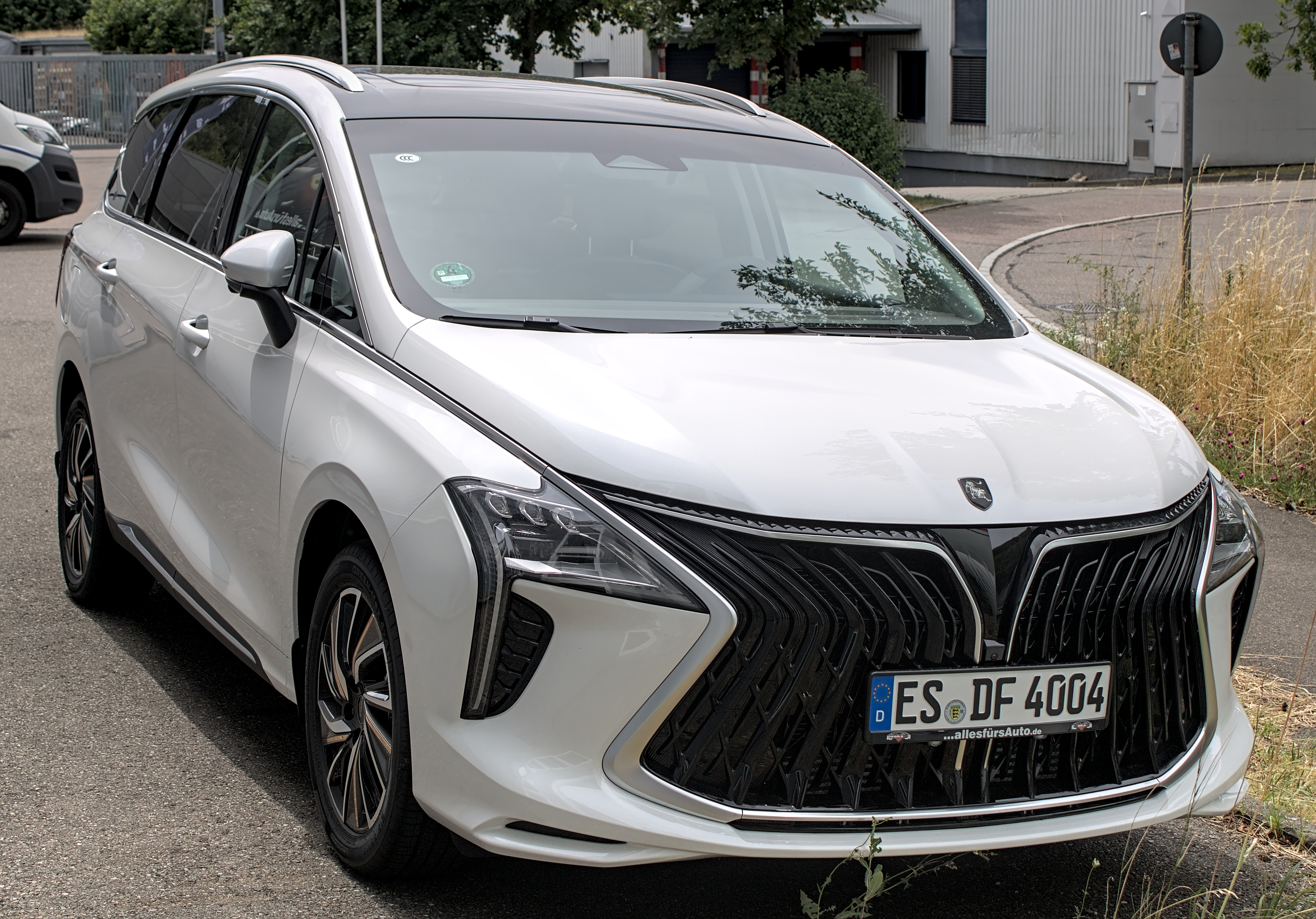
Forthing Yacht

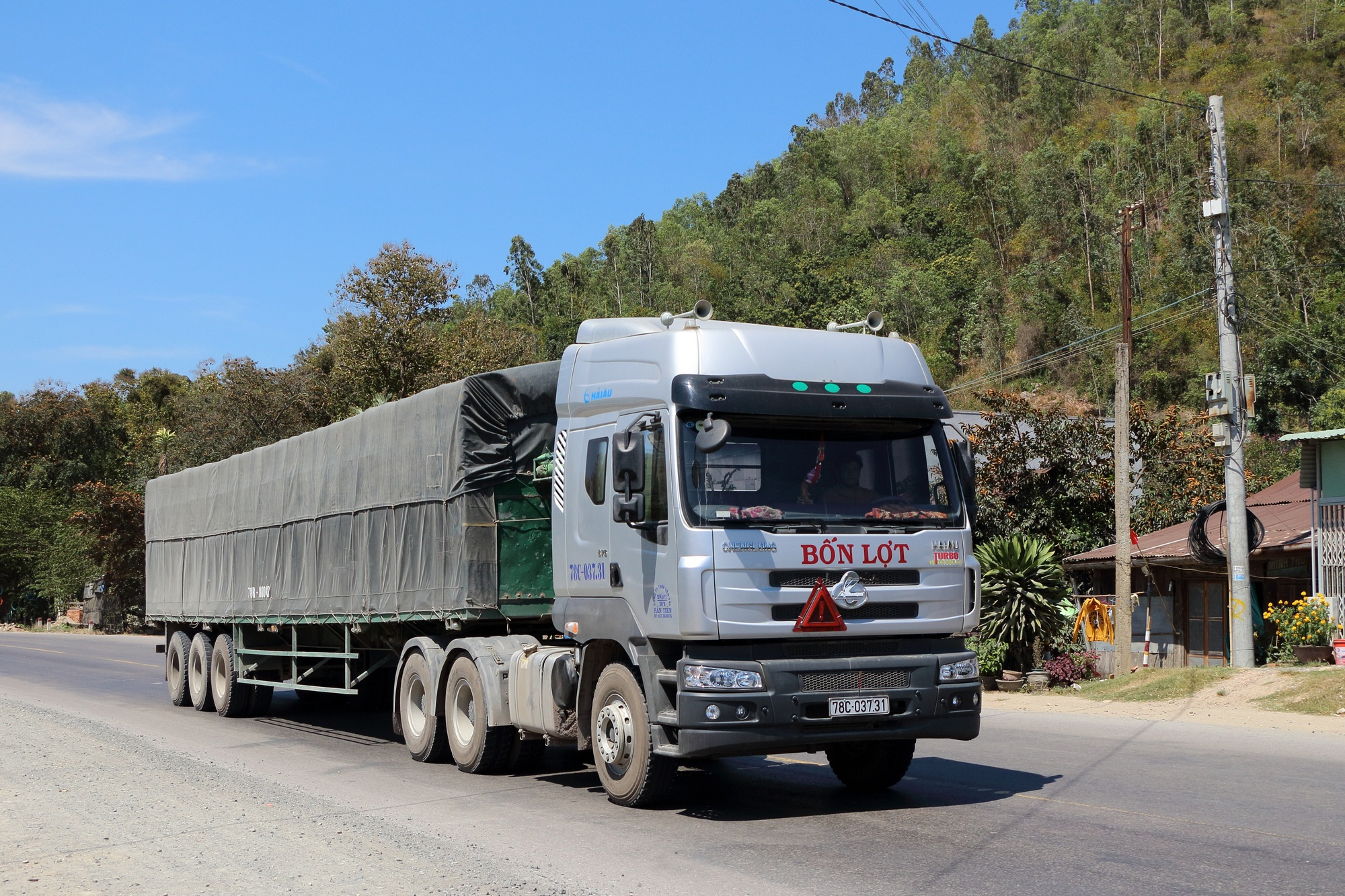
Chenglong Balong 507

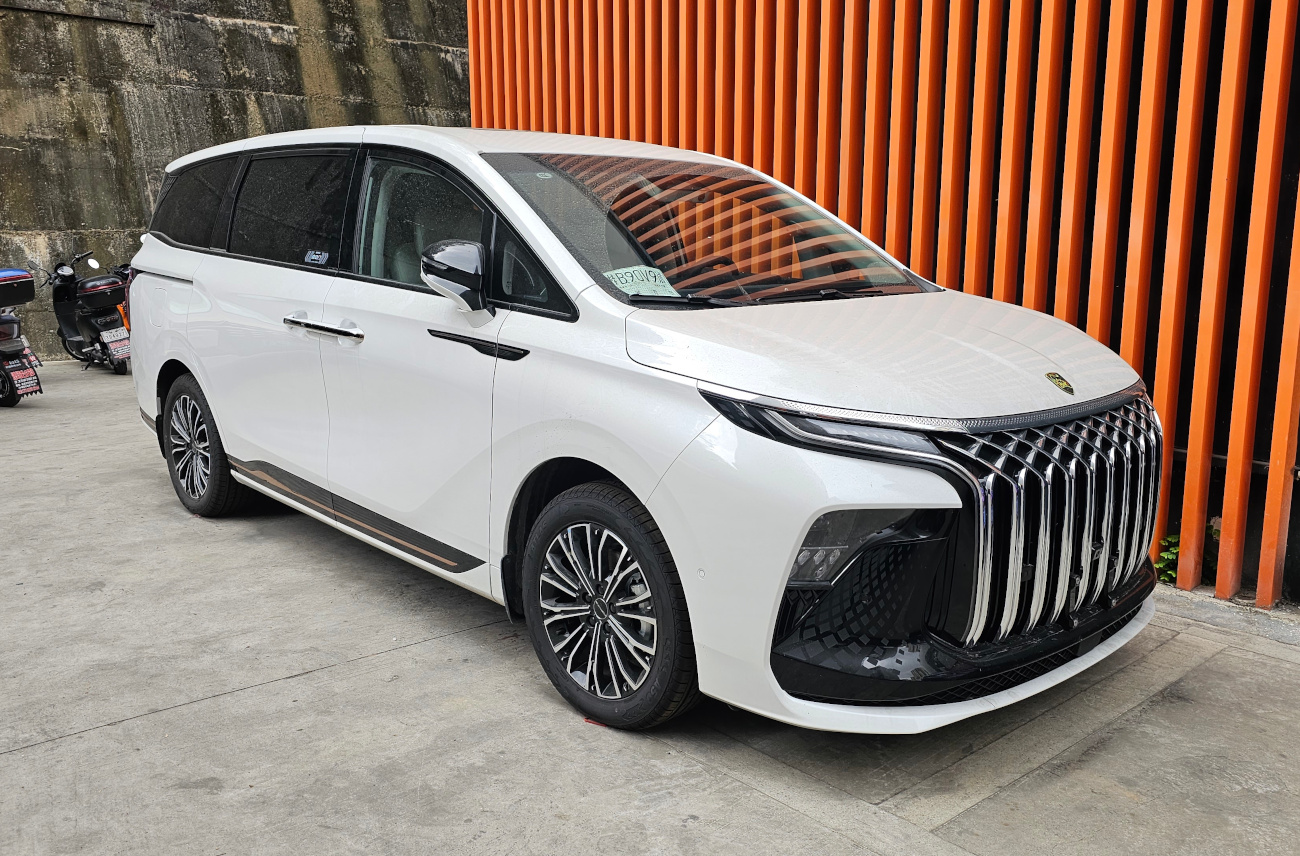
Forthing U-Tour V9

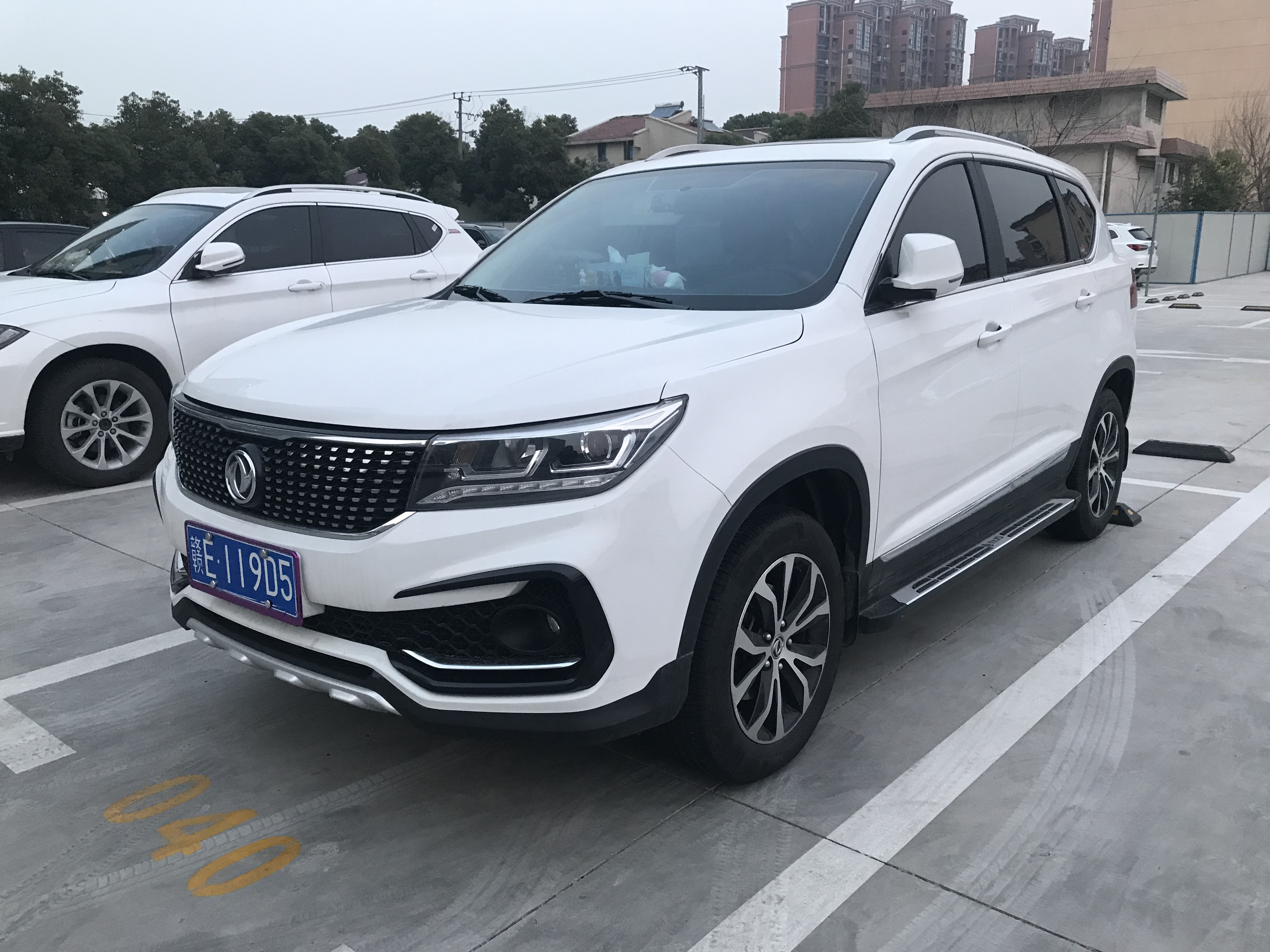
Dongfeng Fengxing Jingyi X5 II

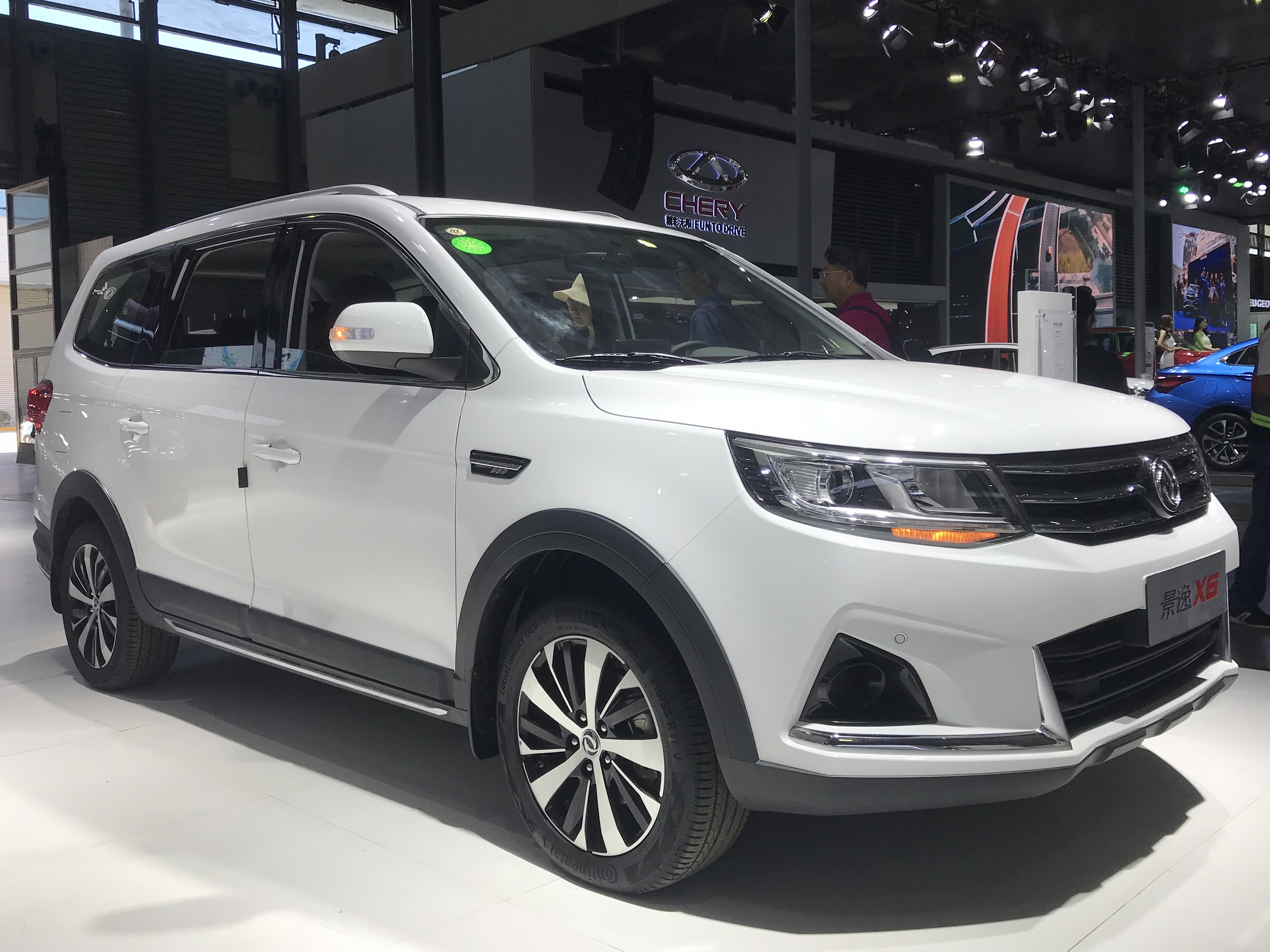
Fengxing Jingyi X6

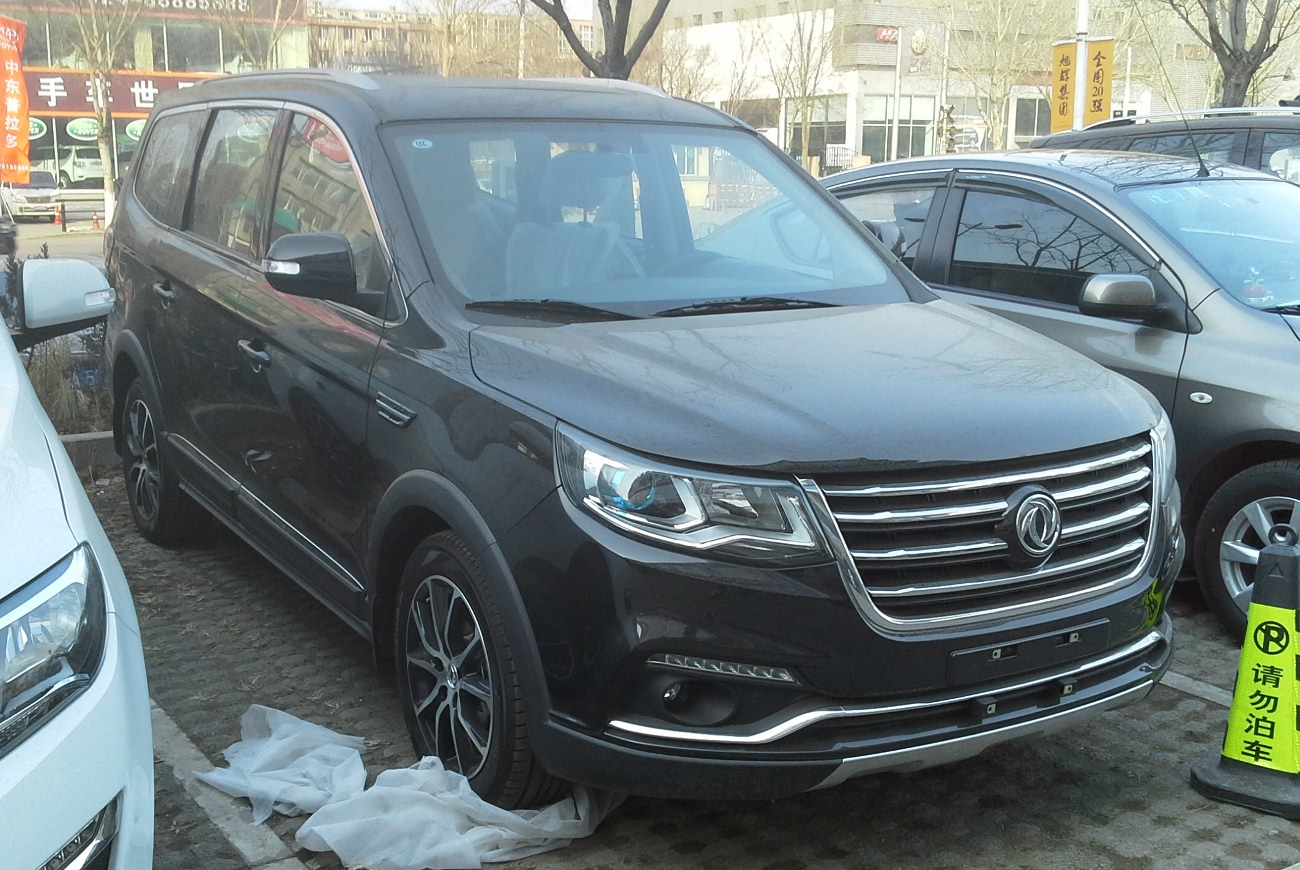
Dongfeng Fengxing SX6

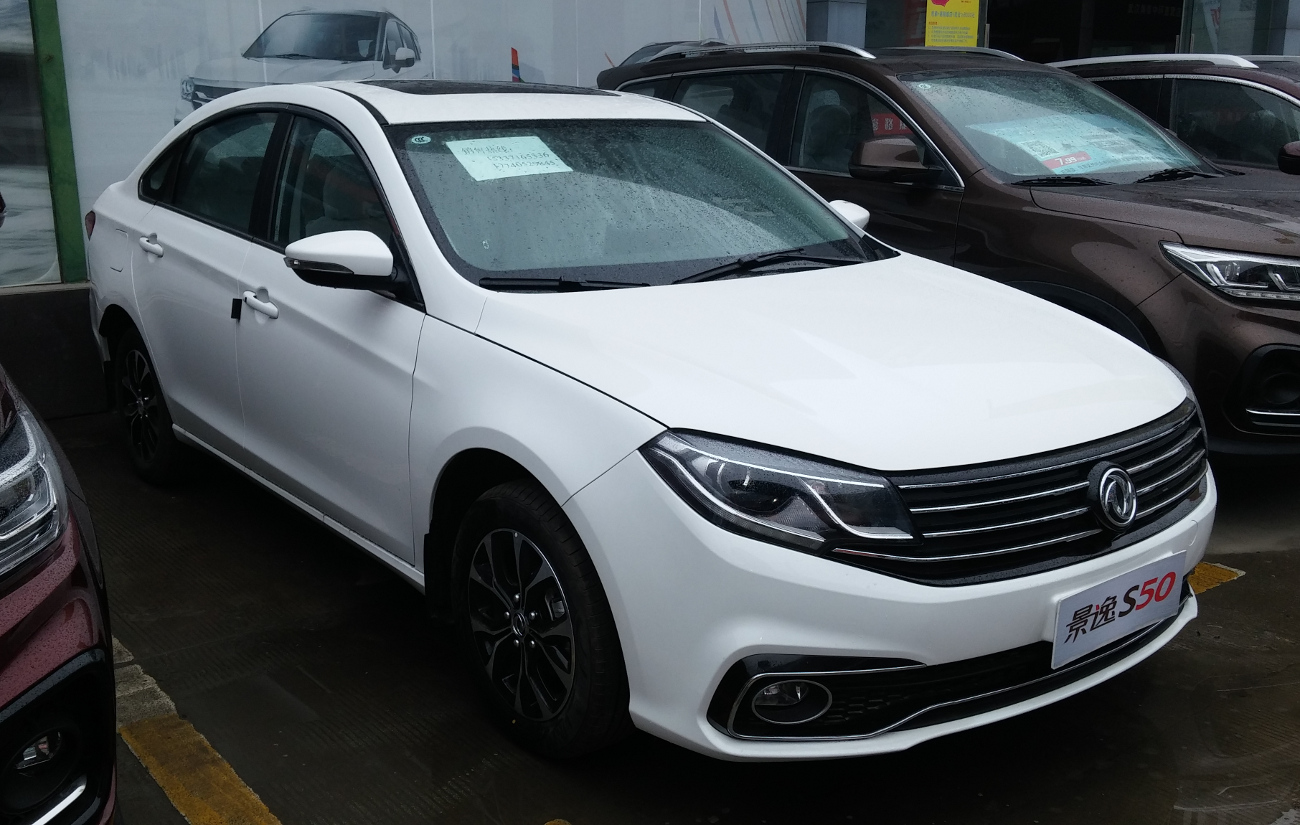
Dongfeng Fengxing Jingyi S50

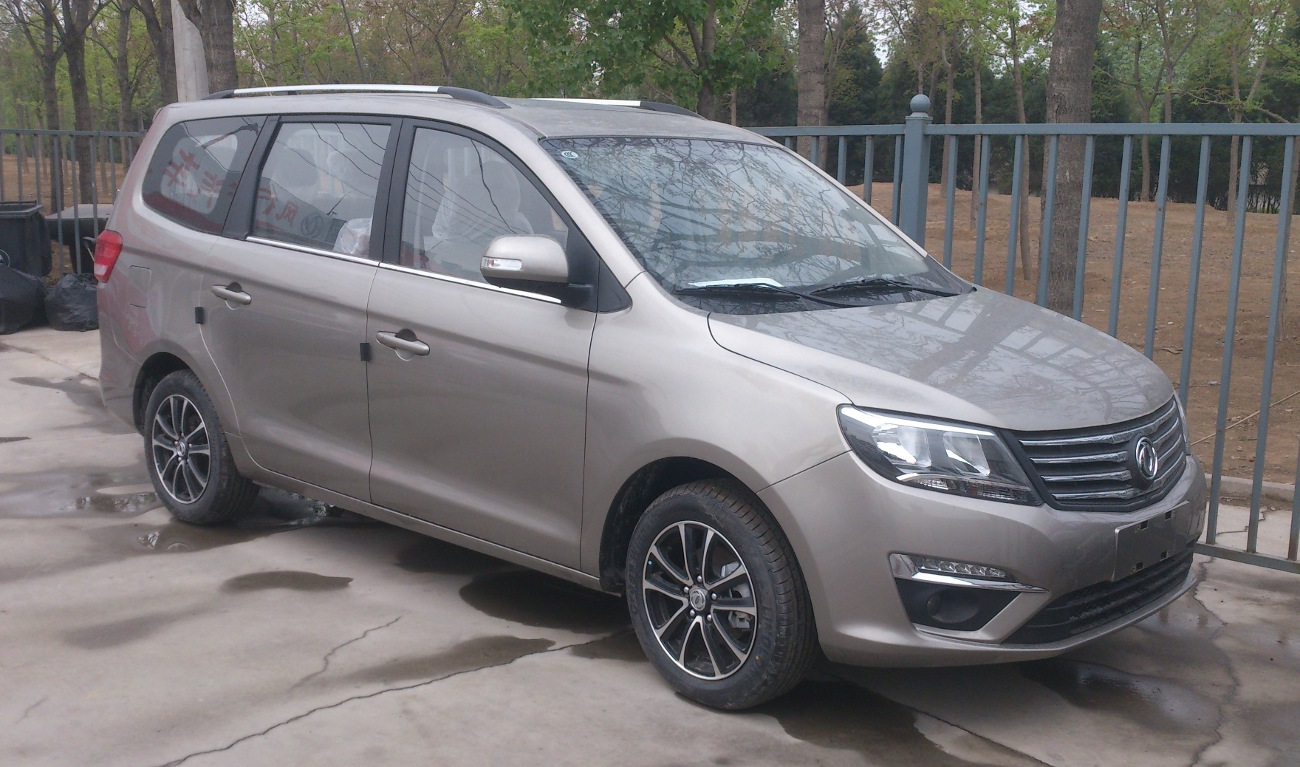
Dongfeng Fengxing S500

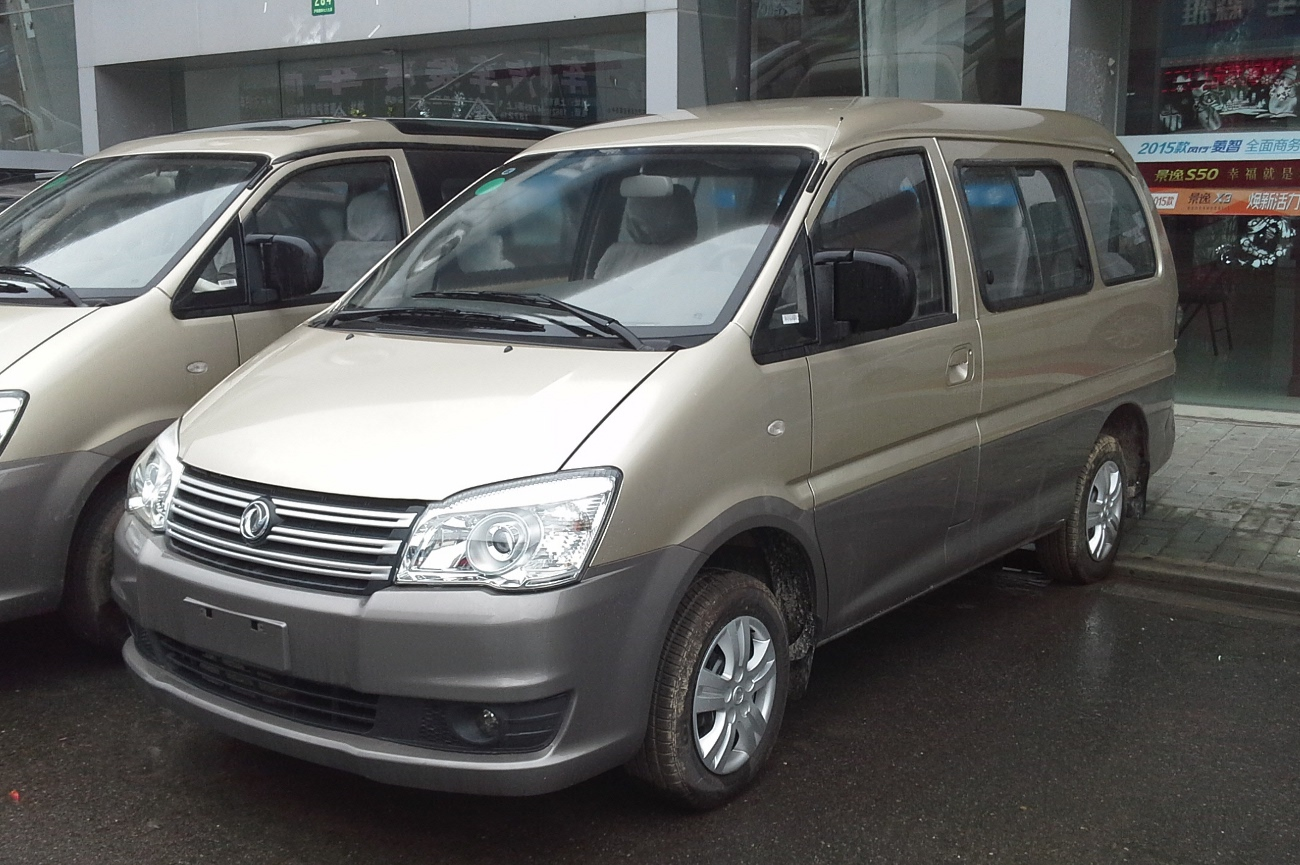
Dongfeng Fengxing Lingzhi M3

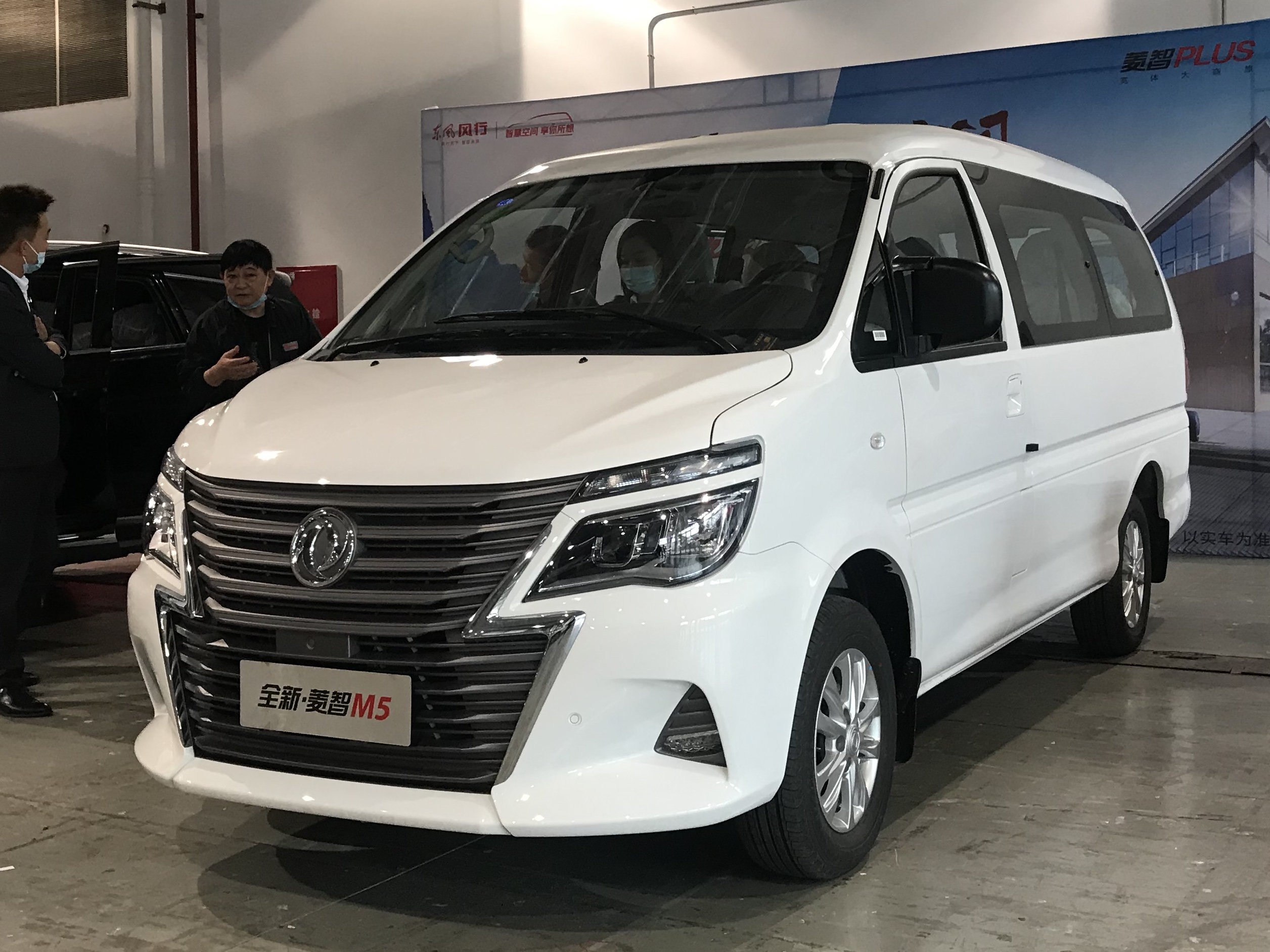
Dongfeng Fengxing Lingzhi M5

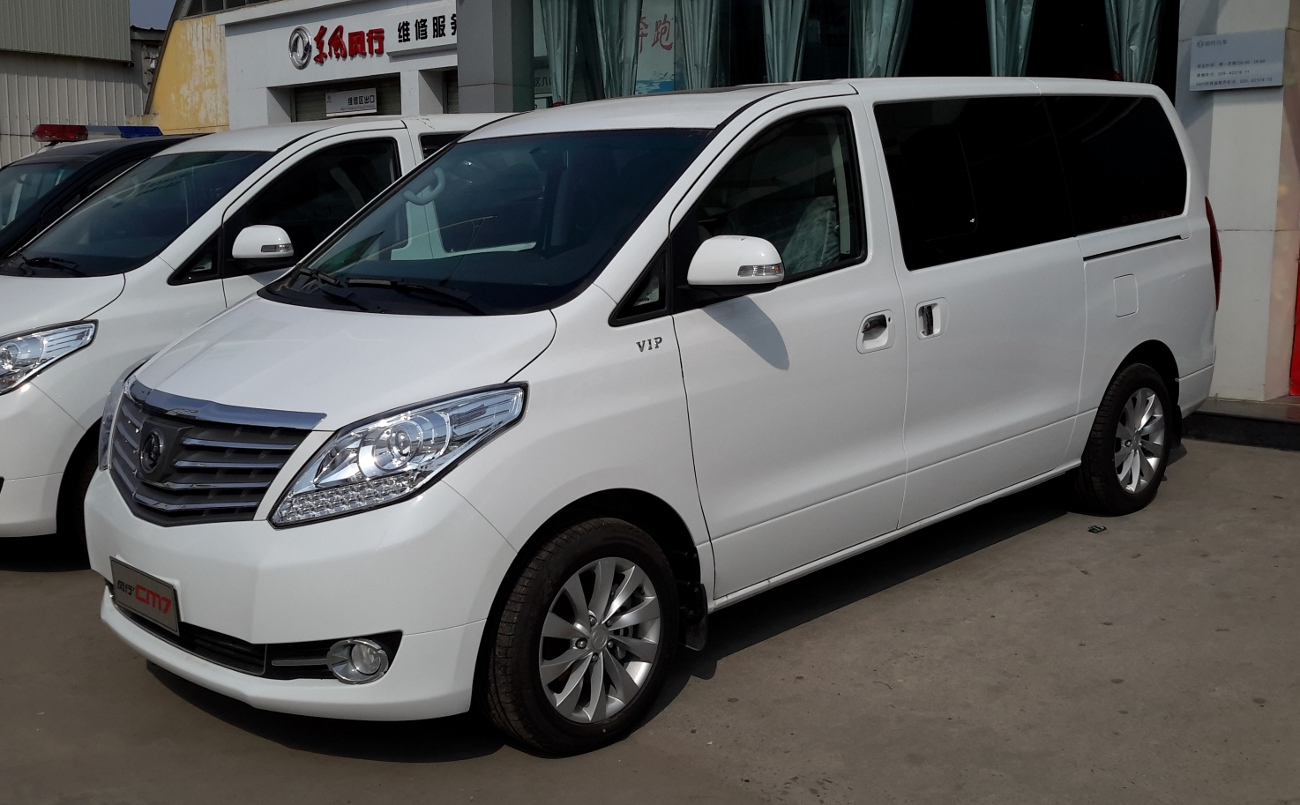
Dongfeng Fengxing CM7

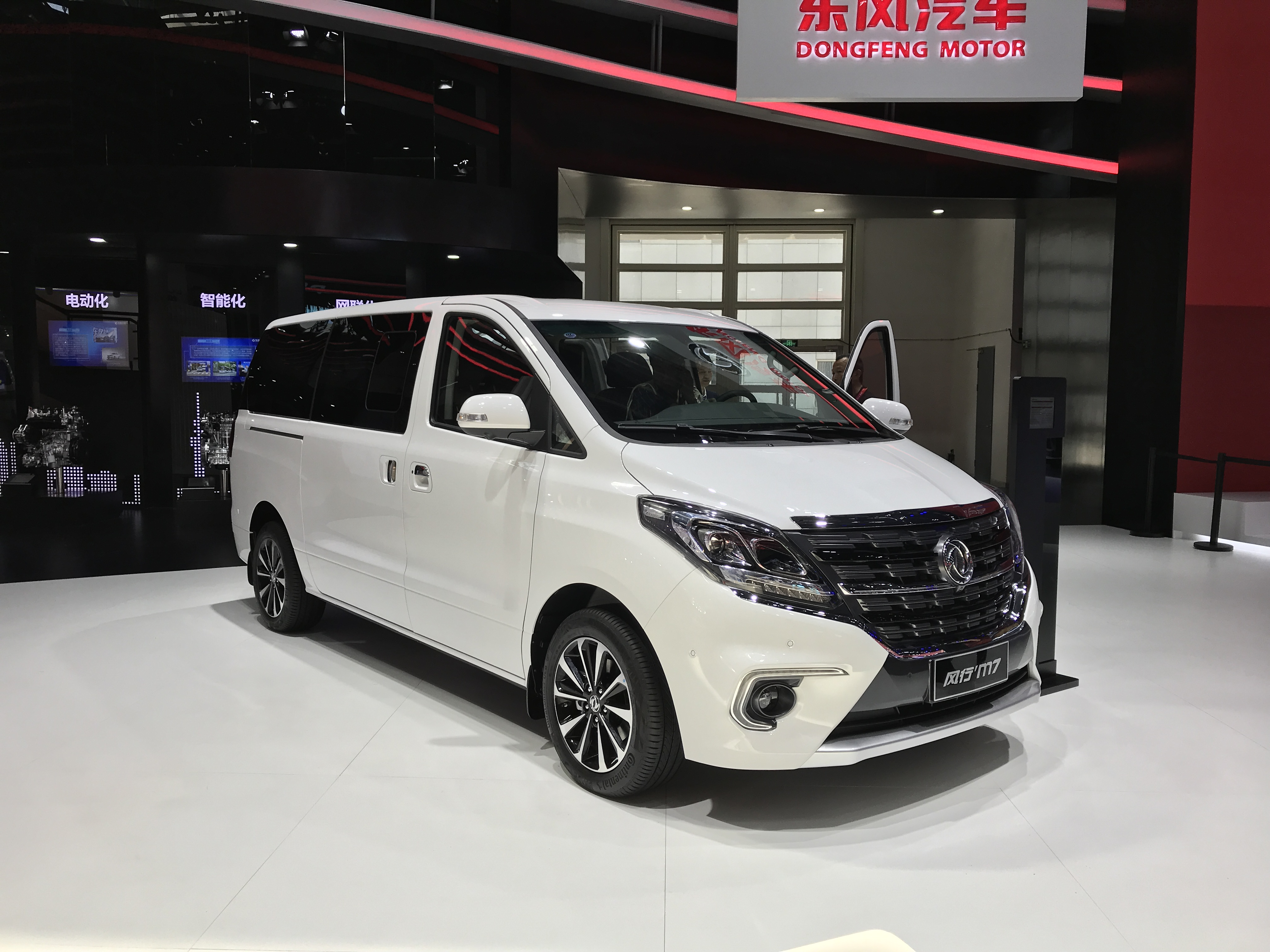
Dongfeng Fengxing M7

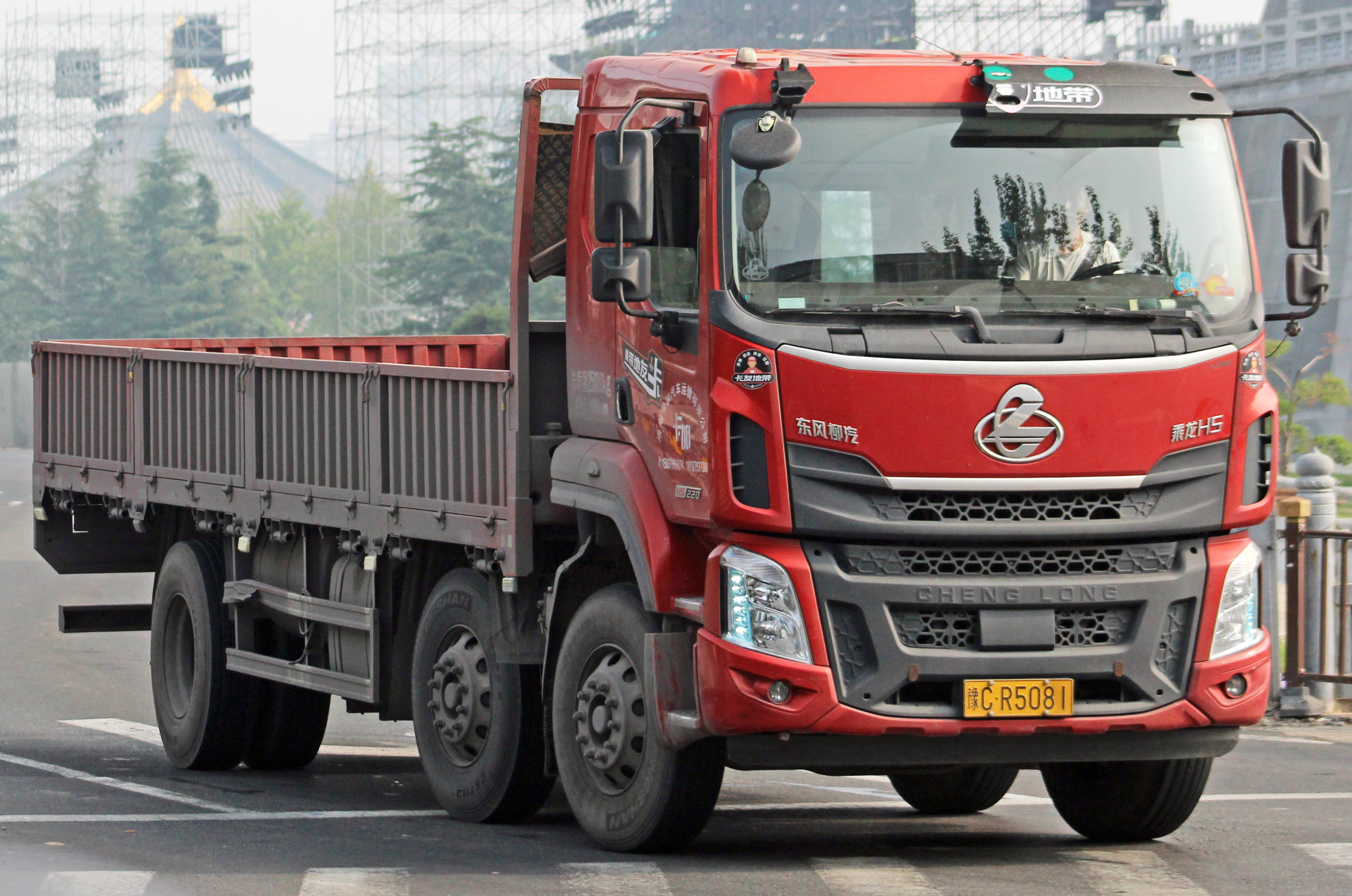
Dongfeng Chenglong H5
