= Forthing SX6 =

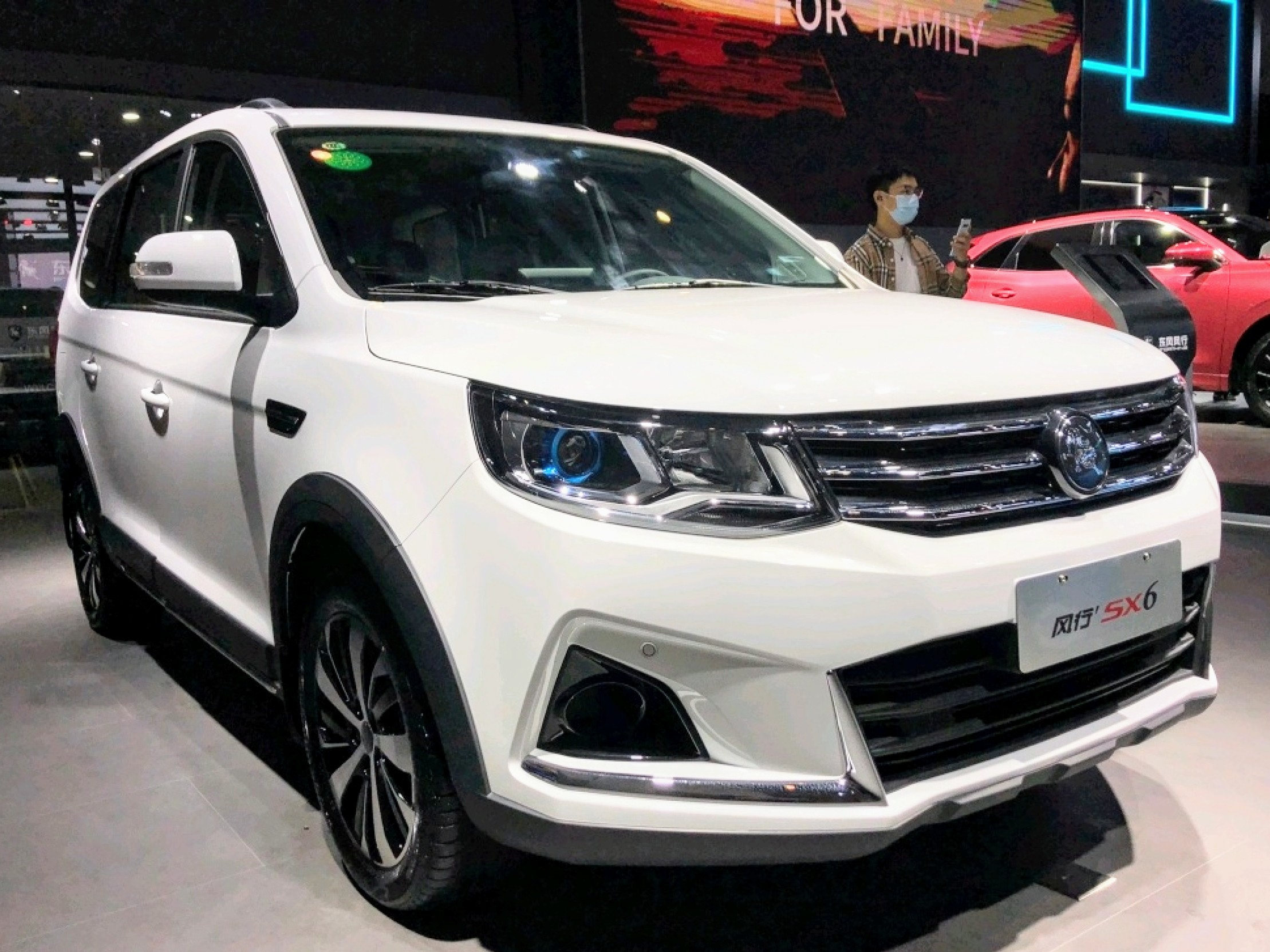

Overview
- Manufacturer: Forthing (Dongfeng Liuzhou Motor)
- Also called: Farda SX6 (Iran)
- Production: 2016–2023
- Assembly: Liuzhou, China; Semnan, Iran

Body and chassis
- Class: Midsize CUV
- Body style: 5–door station wagon
- Layout: FF layout
- Related: Jingyi X6

Powertrain
- Engine: 1.3 L 4G13 I4 Turbo (petrol); 1.6 L 4A92 I4 (petrol); 2.0 L DFMB20 I4 (petrol)
- Transmission: 5 speed manual CVT

Dimensions
- Wheelbase: 2,750 mm (108.3 in)
- Length: 4,650 mm (183.1 in)
- Width: 1,820 mm (71.7 in)
- Height: 1,790 mm (70.5 in)

The Forthing SX6 is a Midsize Crossover sport utility vehicle positioned above the Forthing S500 MPV produced by Dongfeng Liuzhou Motor under the Forthing (Dongfeng Fengxing) sub-brand, and it officially debuted in July 2016.

== Overview ==
The SX6 is a seven-seater in a 2-2-3 seating configuration with prices ranging from 69,900 yuan to 102,900 yuan. Two engines are available for the Fengxing SX6, including a 1.6 liter engine producing 117hp and 150nm, and a 2.0 liter engine producing 138hp and 200nm. The 1.6 liter engine is mated to a five-speed manual gearbox or a CVT, and the 2.0 liter engine is only available with the five-speed manual gearbox. No automatic box is offered for the Fengxing SX6. The 1.6 liter engine codenamed 4A9 is sourced from Mitsubishi and the 2.0 liter engine is sourced from PSA.

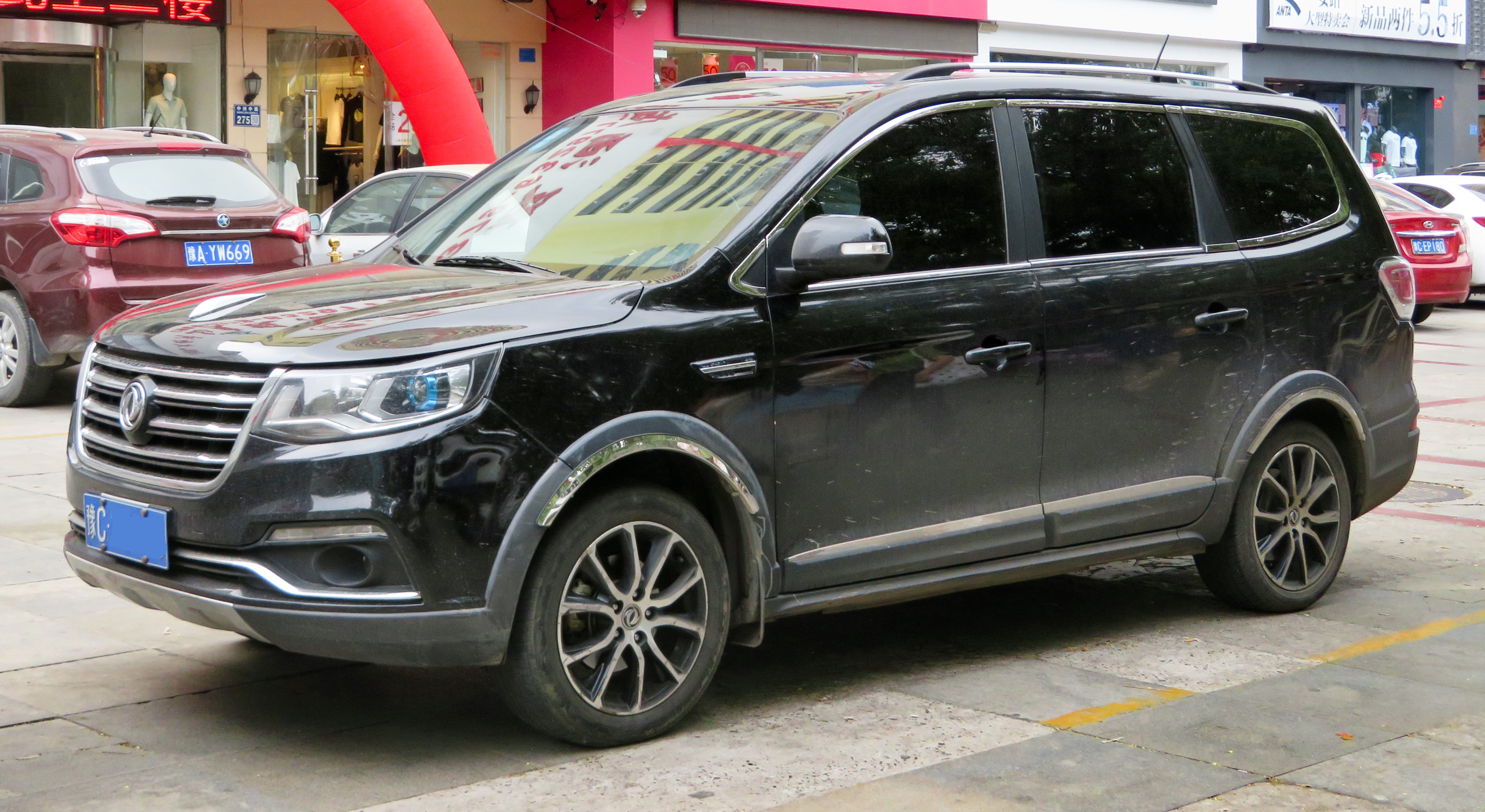
Dongfeng Fengxing SX6 (pre-facelift)

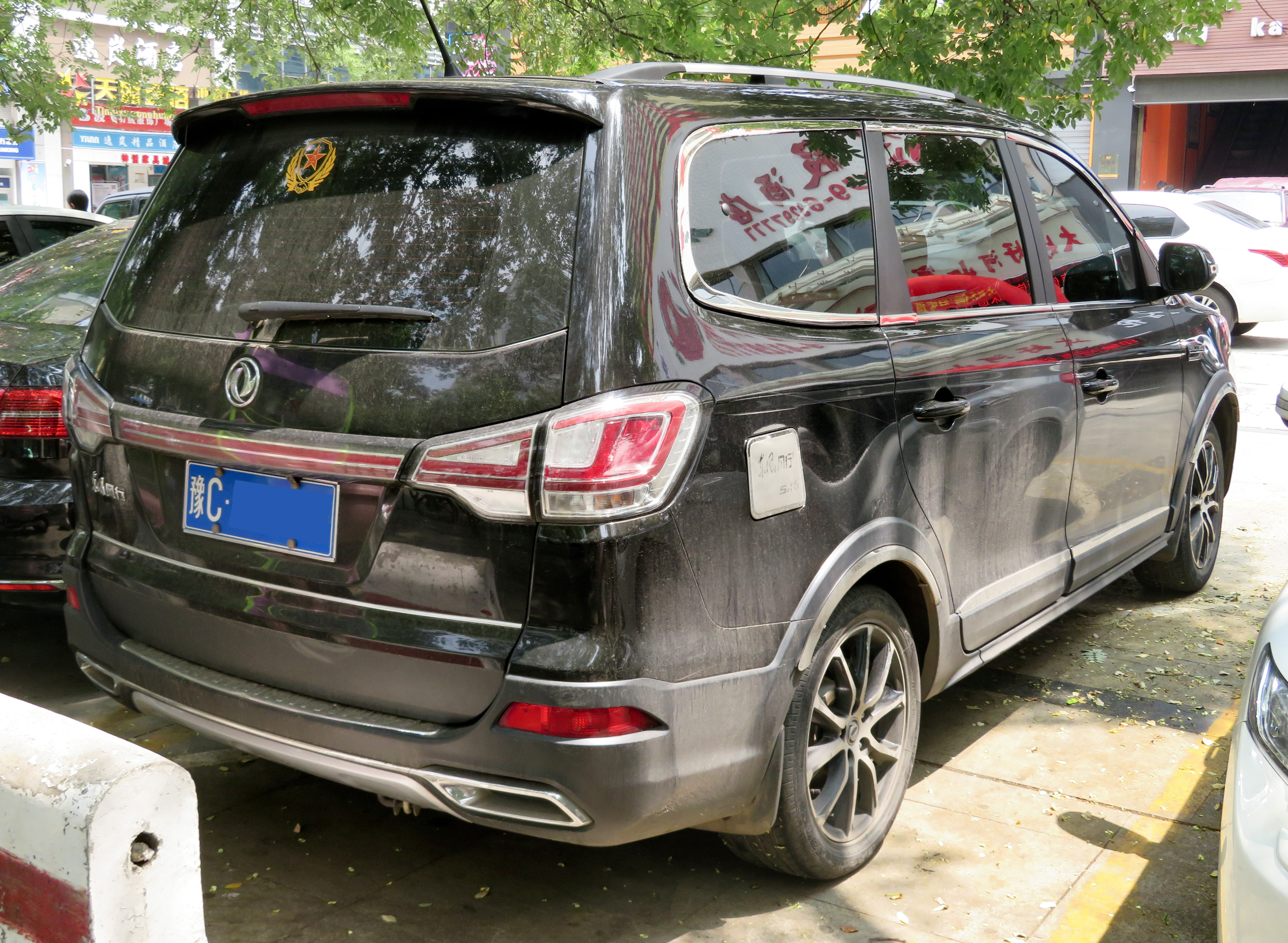
Dongfeng Fengxing SX6 rear (pre-facelift)

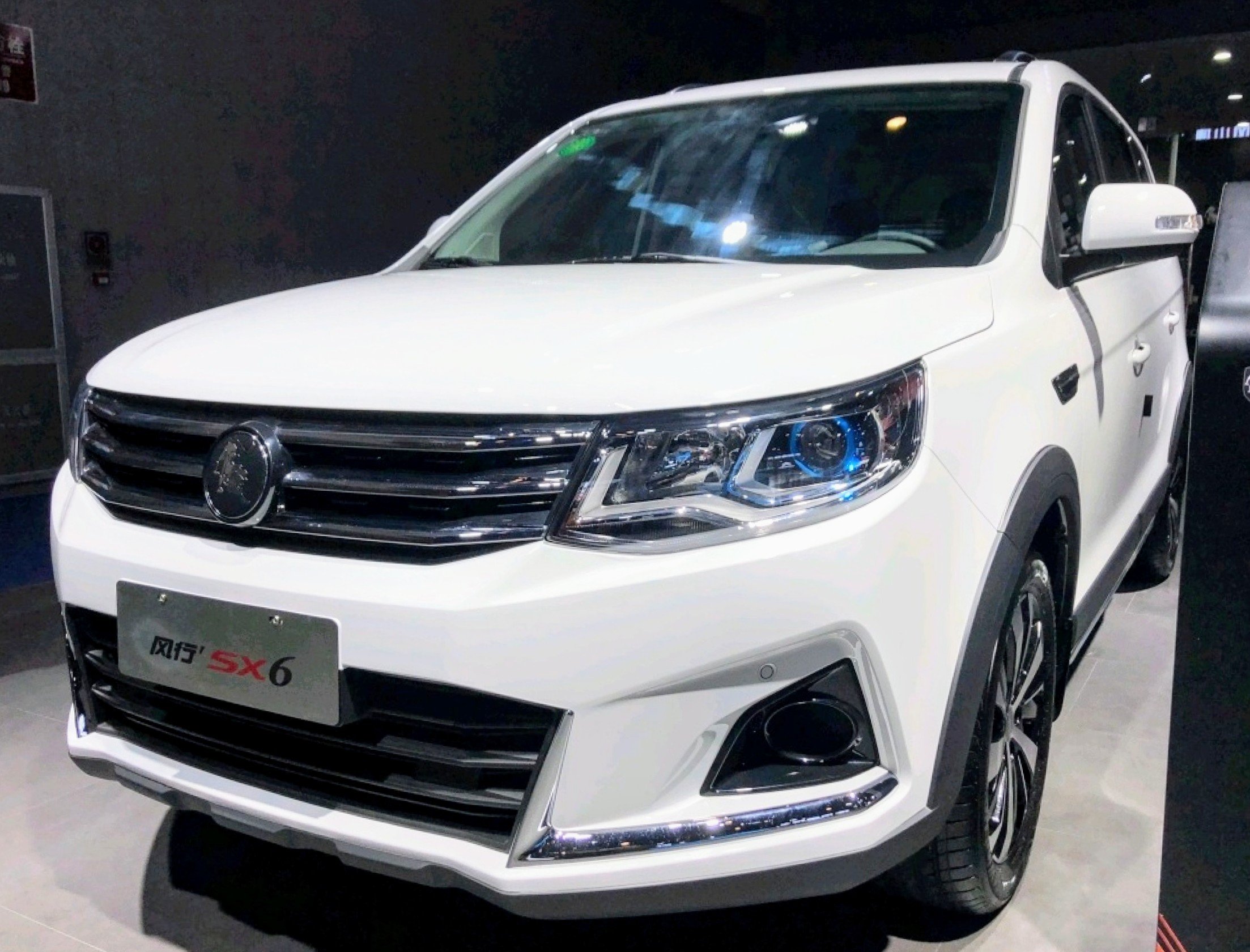
Forthing SX6 (post-facelift)

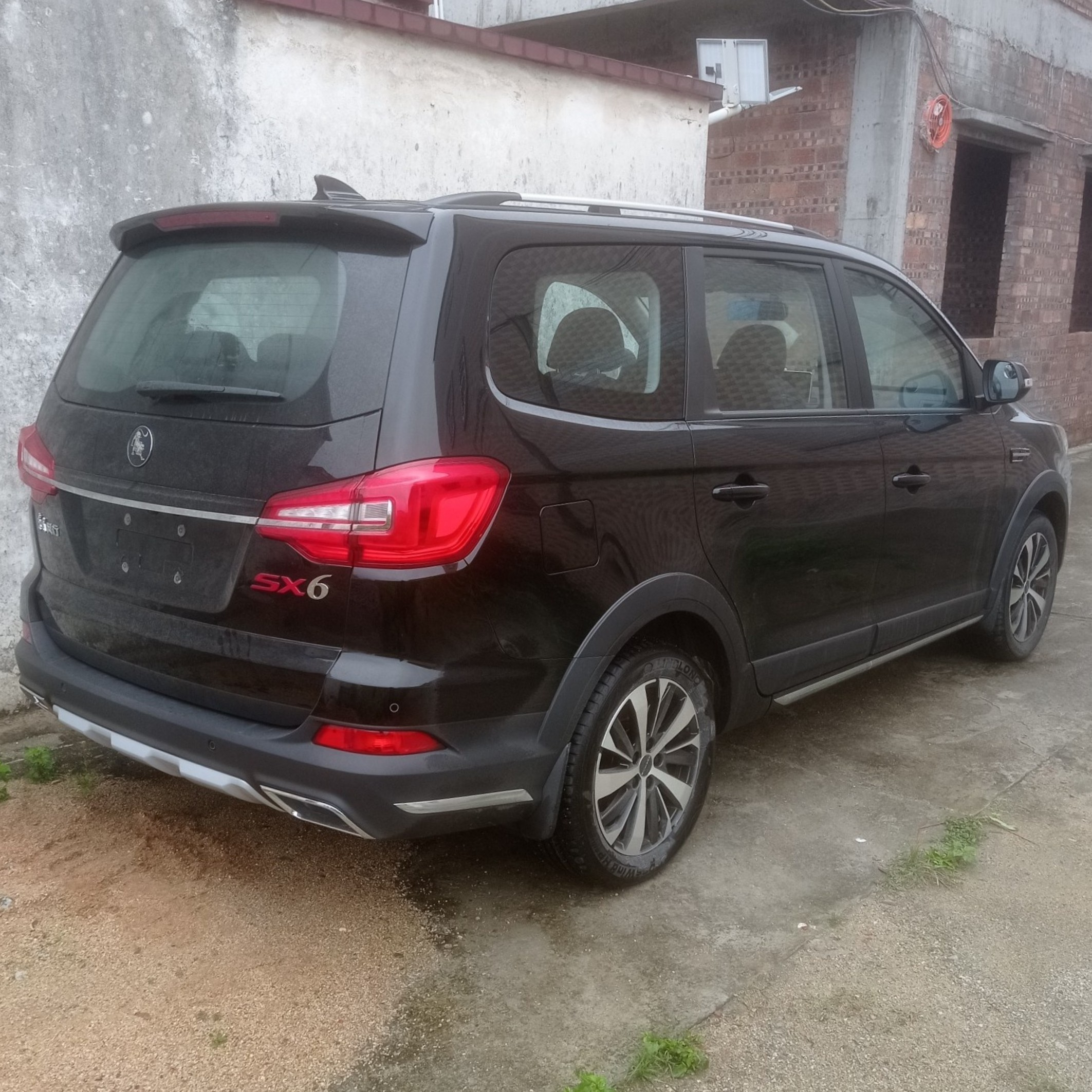
Forthing SX6 (post-facelift)
