= Forthing =

Chinese automobile brand owned by Dongfeng Liuzhou Motor

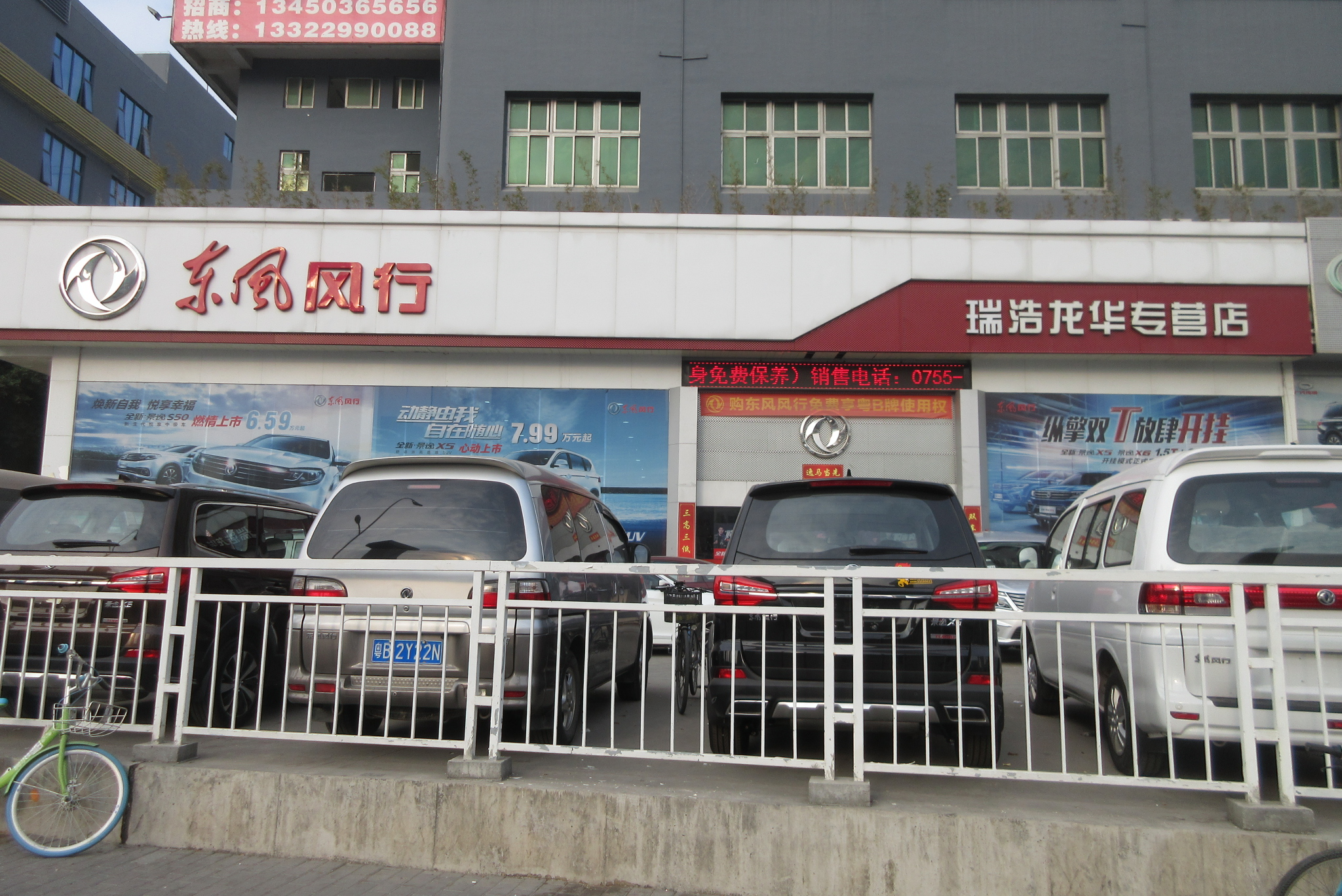
- Forthing (Dongfeng Fengxing) dealership in Longhua, Shenzhen
- Product type: Automobile marque
- Current owner: Dongfeng Liuzhou Motor
- Country: China
- Introduced: 2001; 25 years ago
- Markets: China; Europe; Middle East; South America
- Website: www.forthingmotor.com

Chinese name
- Traditional Chinese: 東風風行
- Simplified Chinese: 东风风行
Transcriptions
Standard Mandarin
- Hanyu Pinyin: Dōngfēng Fēngxing

Forthing (Dongfeng Fengxing) is an automobile marque owned by the Chinese automaker Dongfeng Liuzhou Motor, a division of Dongfeng Motor Group. The brand was launched in 2001 using the Fengxing (风行) name, and was later renamed to Forthing as the English name, while the Chinese name remained the same (Chinese: 风行; pinyin: Fēngxing).

From the launch of the brand, Forthing, or Fengxing brand products, have always featured the Dongfeng emblem, just like the majority of vehicle brands under the Dongfeng umbrella. On 17 November 2020, the Forthing T5 EVO crossover was launched, and at the press conference, Dongfeng Fengxing's new lion emblem was unveiled, with the Forthing T5 EVO being the first product to wear the updated badge. On 10 June 2021, the brand renewal conference of Dongfeng Fengxing was held in Shanghai, where Dongfeng Fengxing's first concept car dedicated to family mobility was unveiled alongside the official announcement of the new emblem. This update includes the new slogan, "Confidence, Fearlessness, and Bravery Forward," represented by the lion badge.

Products of the Forthing brand include the Jingyi crossover SUV series also known as Joyear for oversea markets, the Jingyi S50 sedan and the S500 large multi-purpose vehicle, as well as two types of vans, the Lingzhi and the CM7. Some of these models are also sold in Latin American markets such as Chile and Peru under the brands Dongfeng, DFM or DFLZ.

== Products ==
=== Current models ===
- Forthing S50 EV (2016–present), compact sedan
- Forthing T5 (2018–present), compact SUV
- Forthing T5 EVO (2021–present), compact SUV
  - Forthing Xinghai T5/Leiting (2023–present), BEV variant
- Forthing Yacht / 4 U-Tour (2022–present), mid-size MPV
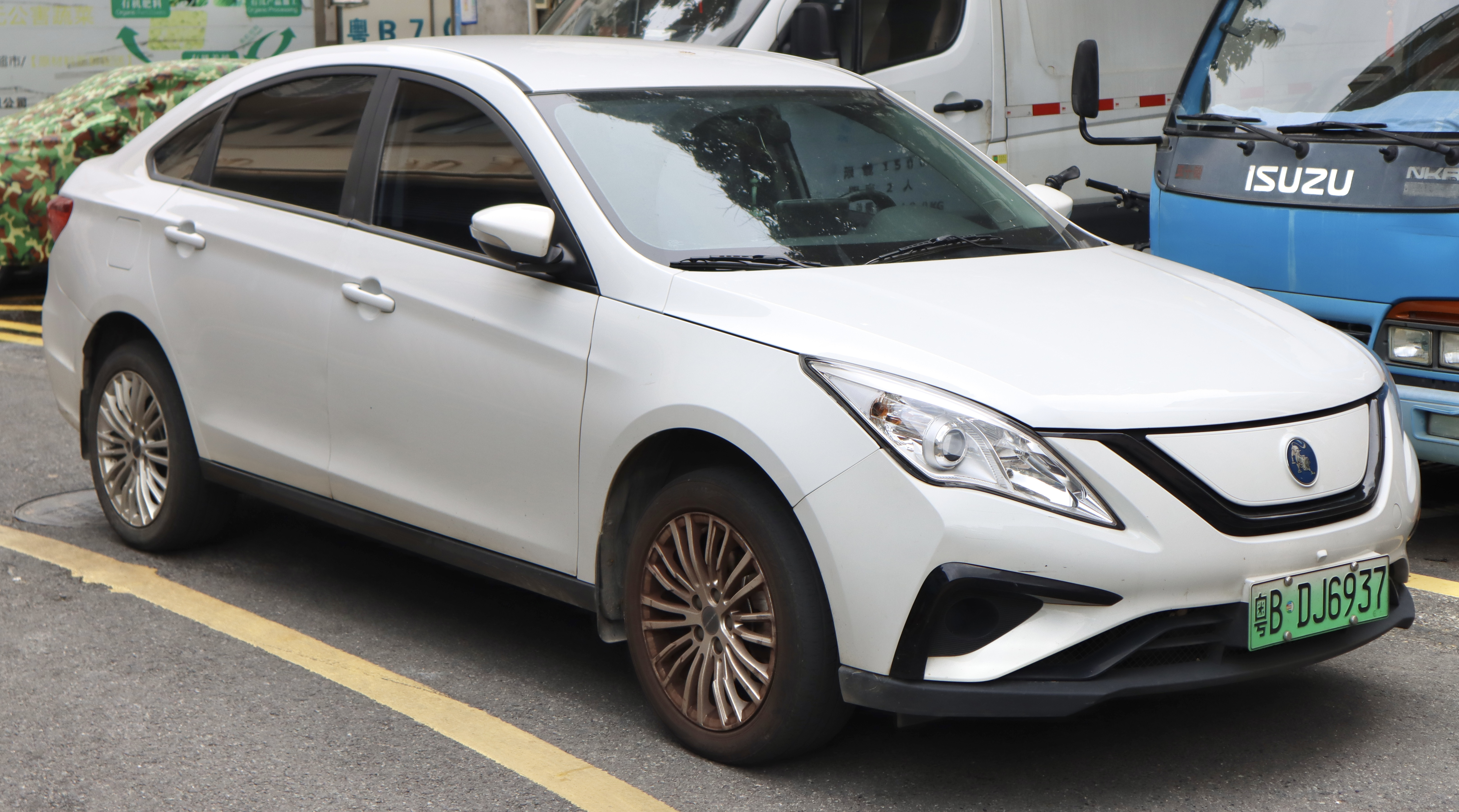
Forthing S50 EV

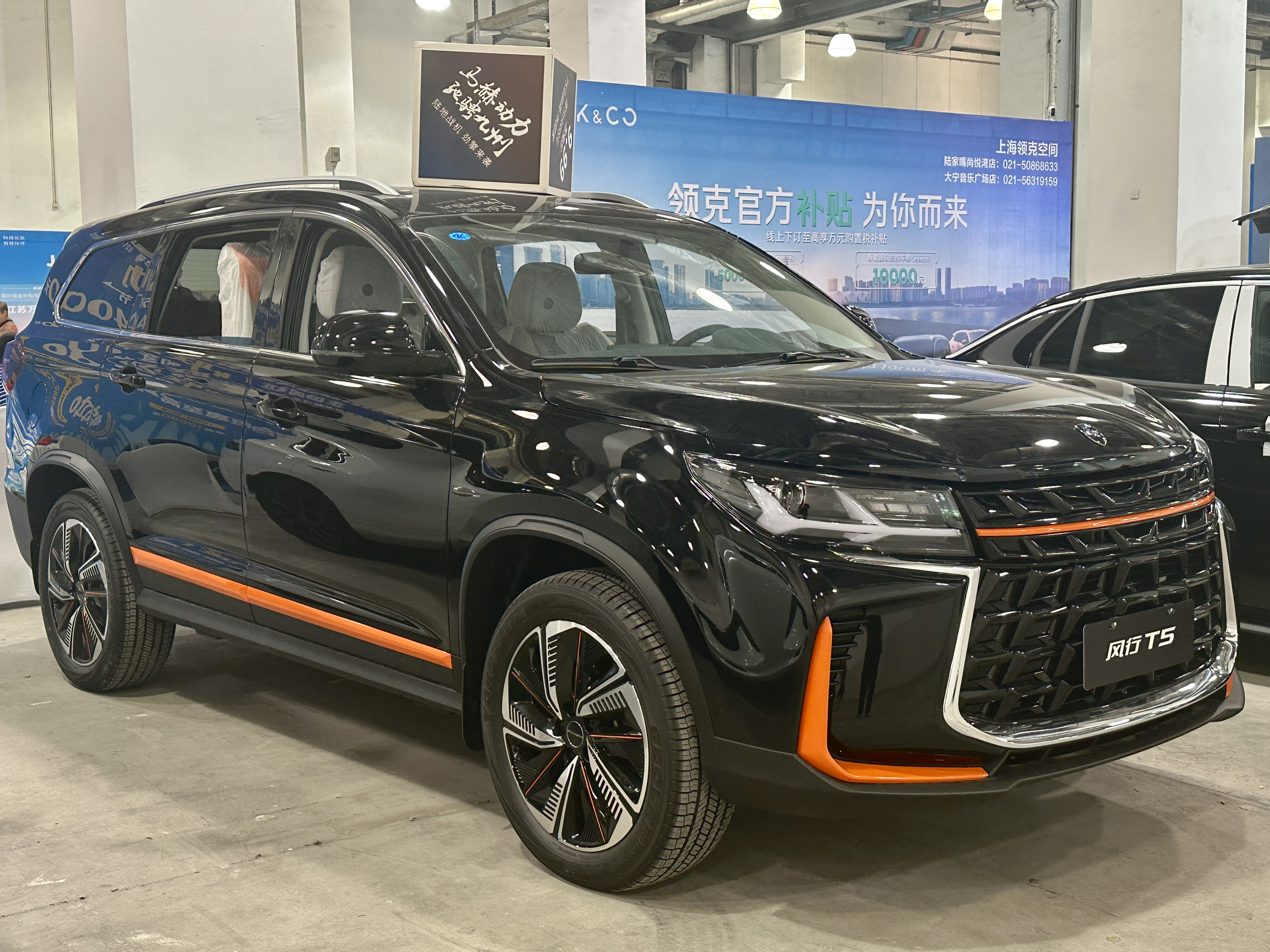
Forthing T5

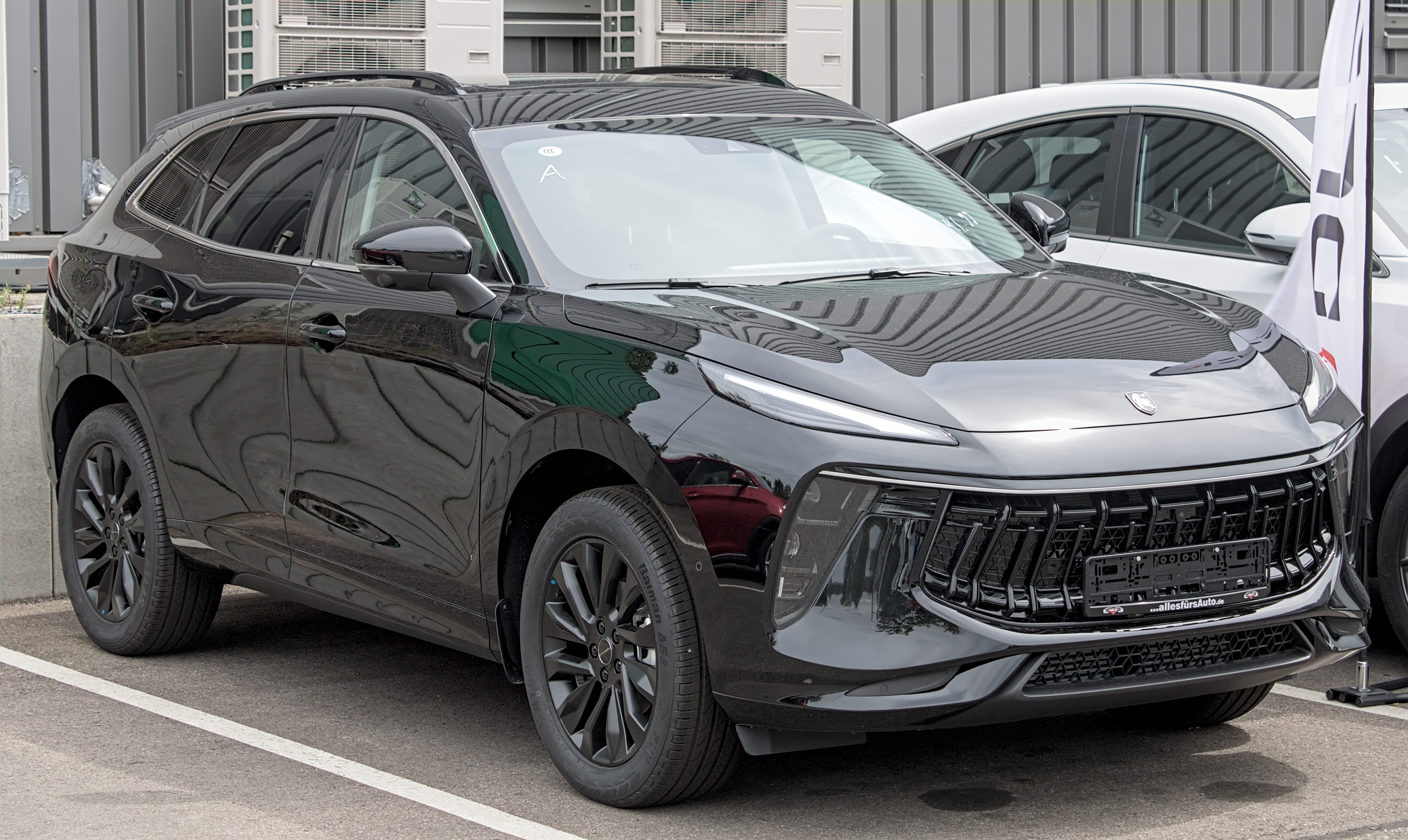
Forthing T5 EVO

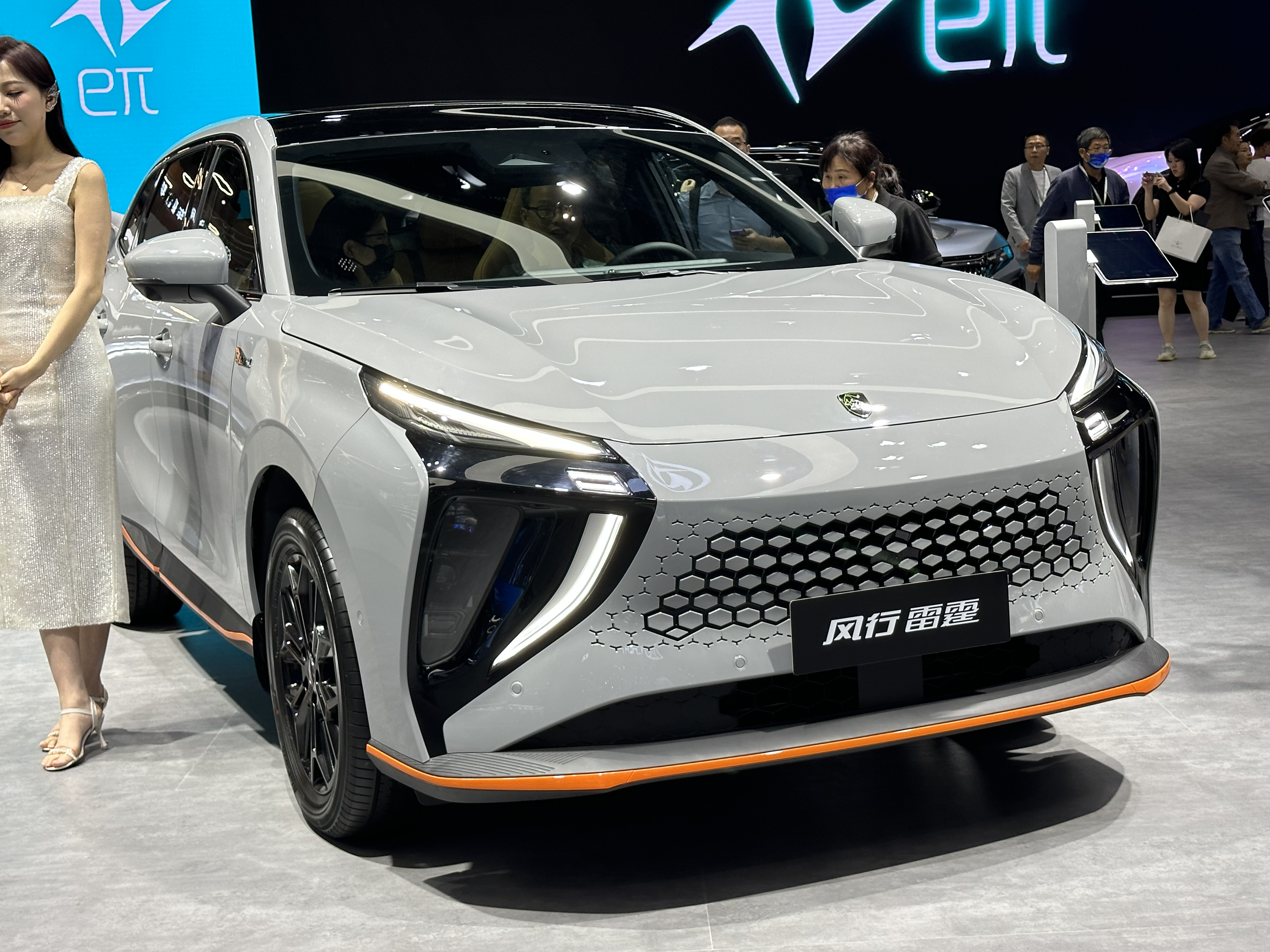
Forthing Leiting

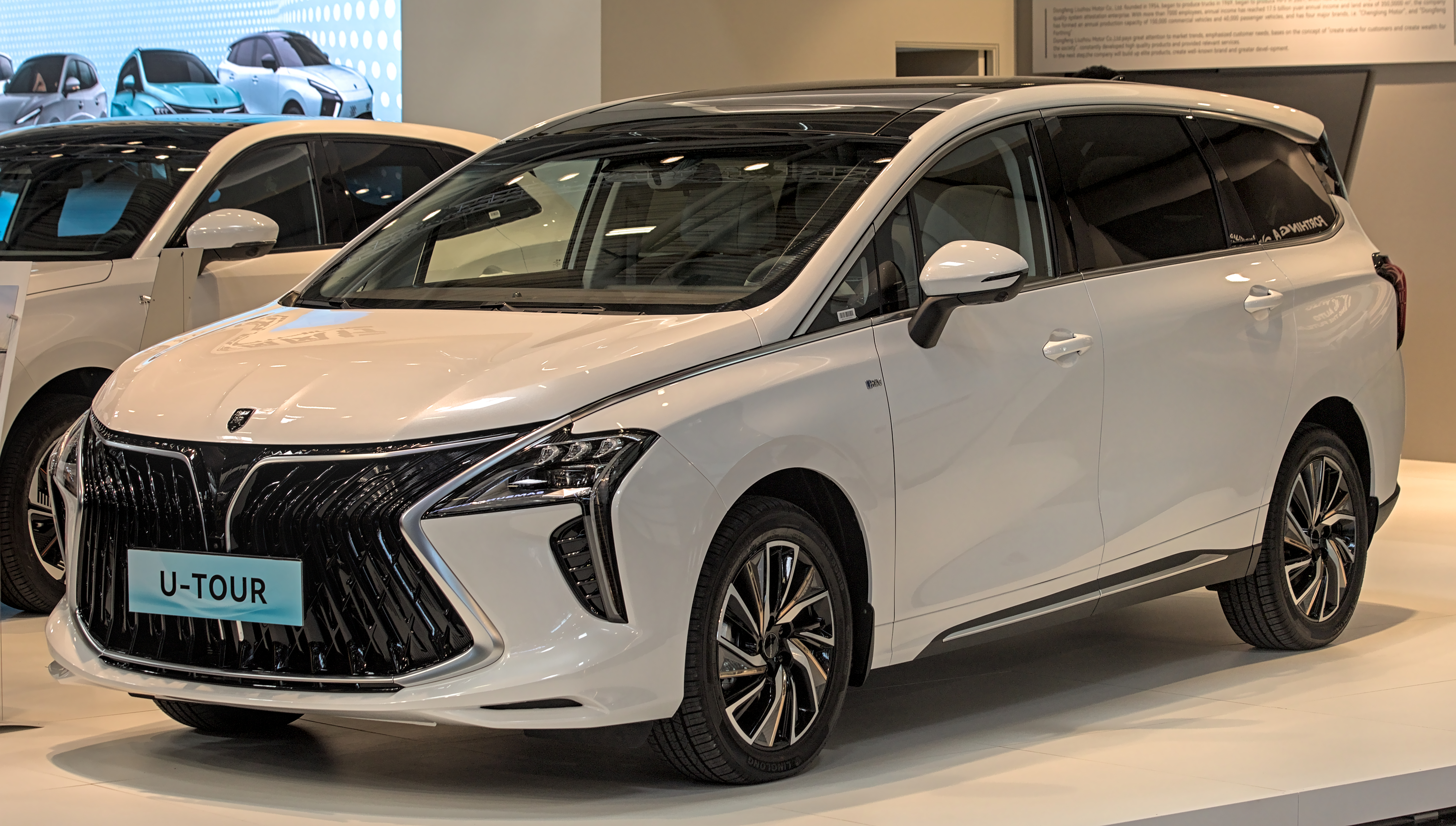
Forthing Yacht

Forthing Xinghai (星海) series models:

- Forthing Xinghai V6 (2026–present), mid-size MPV, PHEV variant
- Forthing Xinghai V9 (2024–present), full-size MPV, PHEV
- Forthing Xinghai S7 (2025–present), mid-size sedan, BEV
- Forthing Xinghai T5 (2026–present), compact CUV, BEV
Forthing Xinghai V6

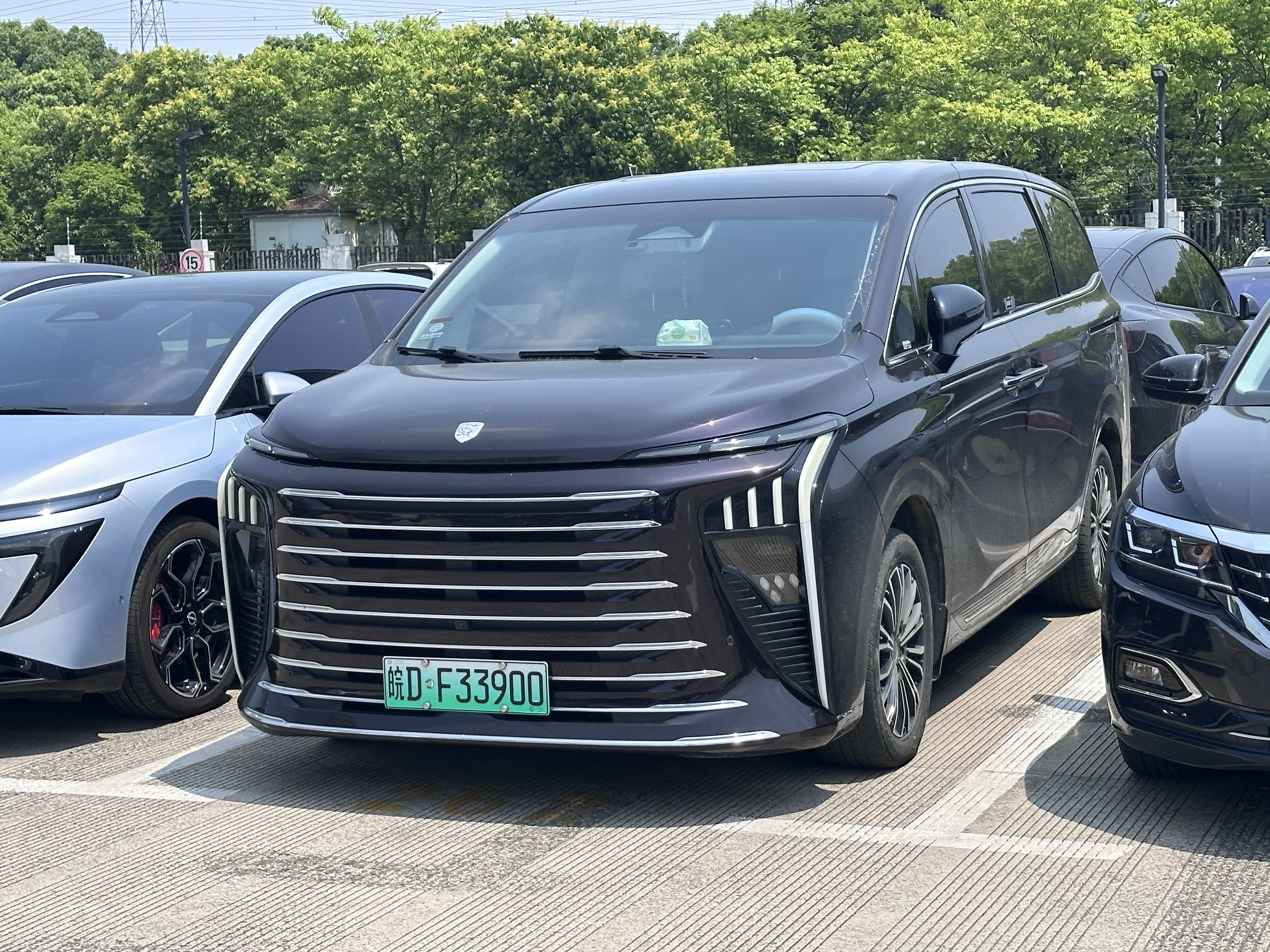
Forthing Xinghai V9

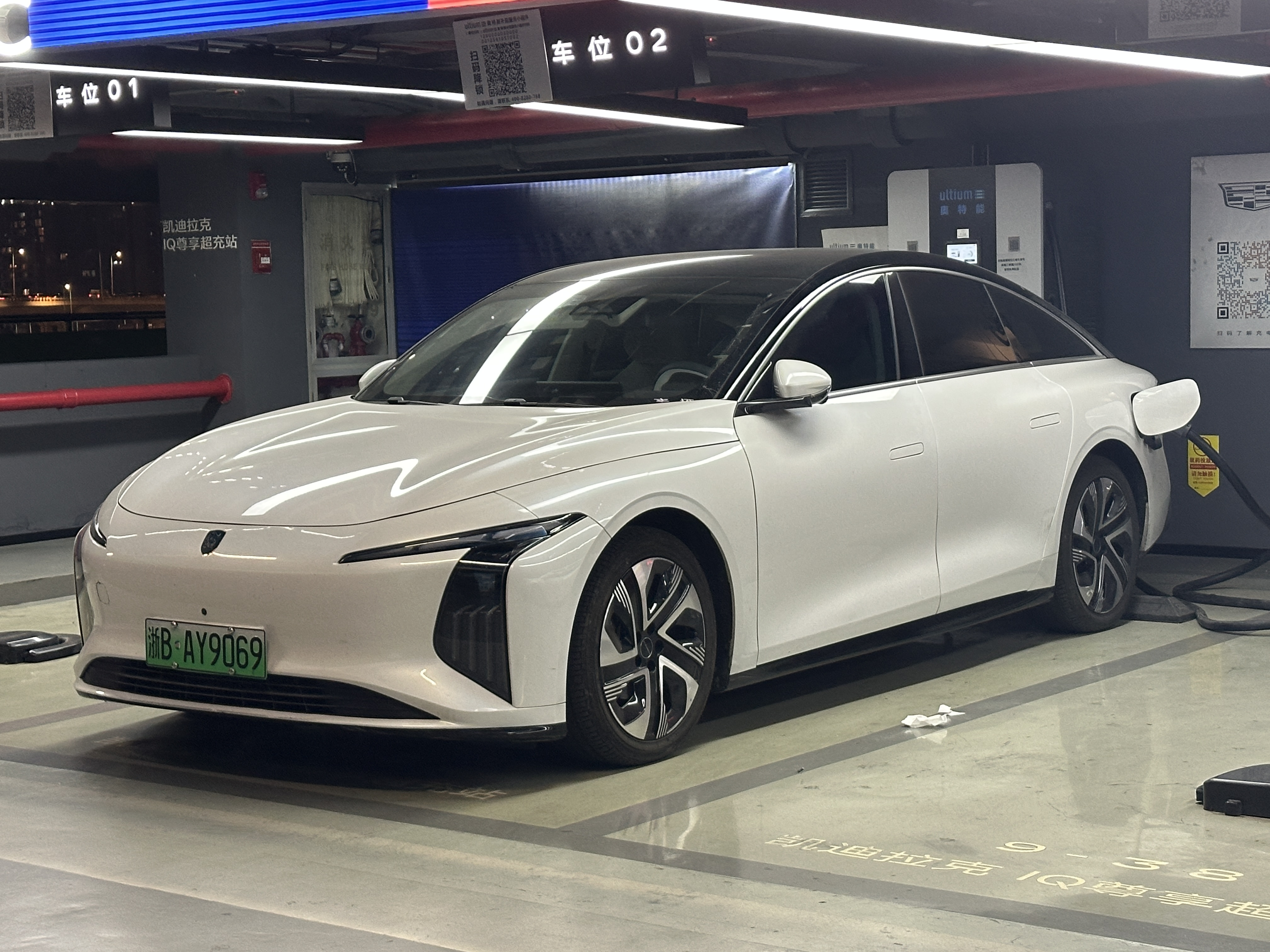
Forthing Xinghai S7

Forthing Xinghai T5

Lingzhi series vans:

- Forthing Lingzhi (2001–present), mid-size MPV
- Forthing Lingzhi M5 (2018–present), full size MPV
- Forthing Lingzhi M7 (2019–present), full size MPV
- Forthing Lingzhi Plus (2021–present), full size MPV
- Forthing Little Lingzhi (To be commenced), compact MPV
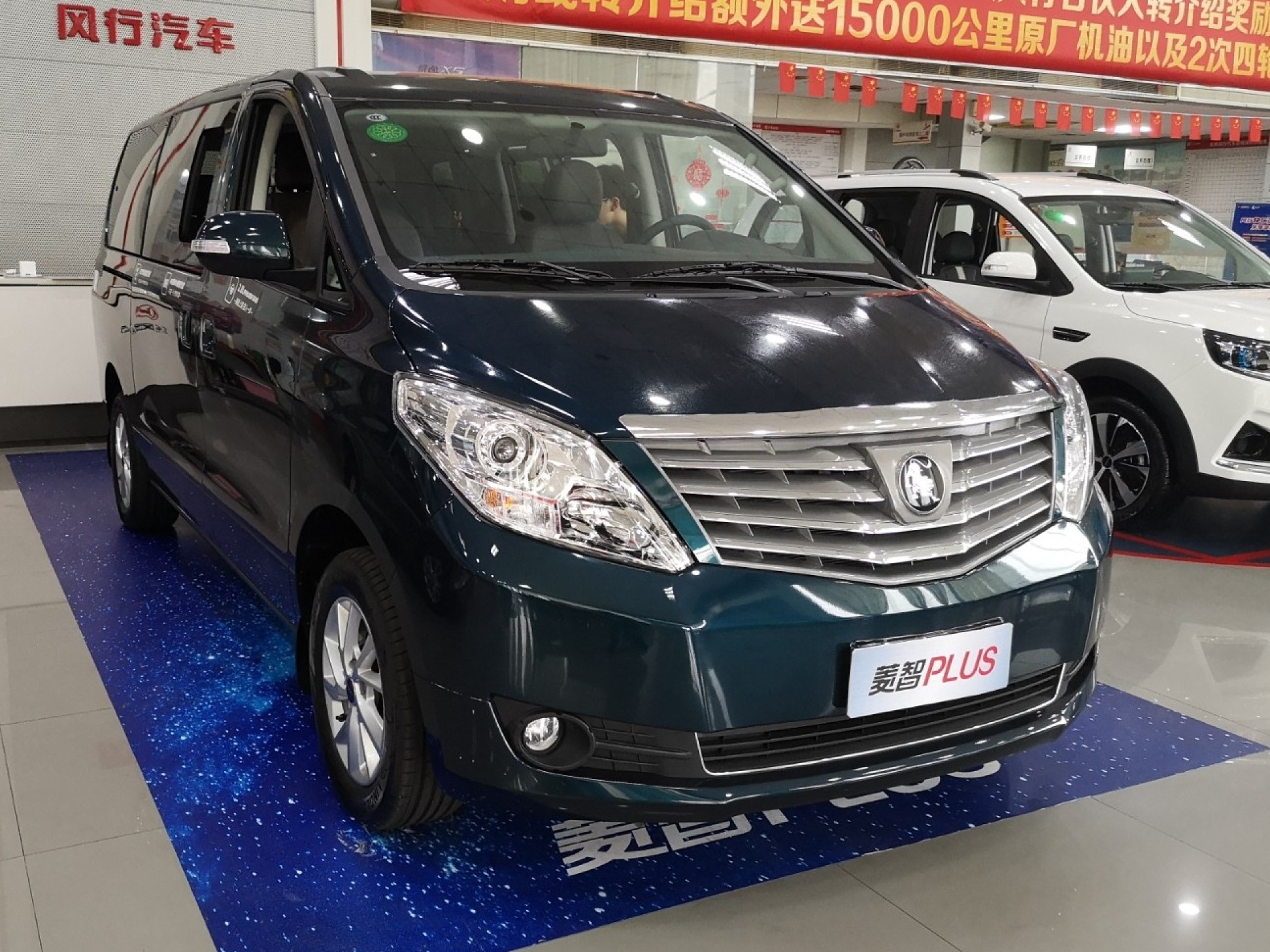
Forthing Lingzhi Plus

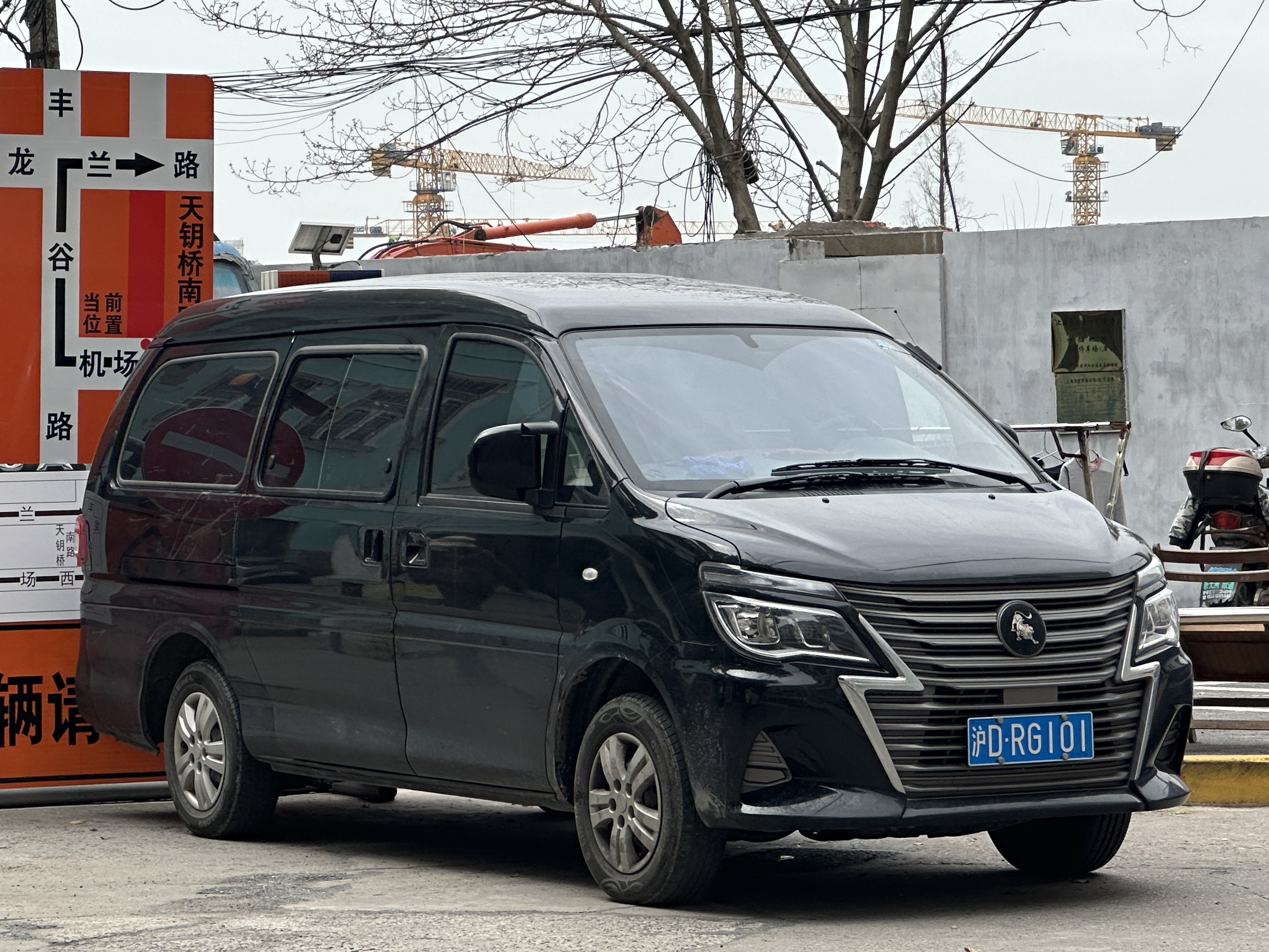
Forthing Lingzhi M5

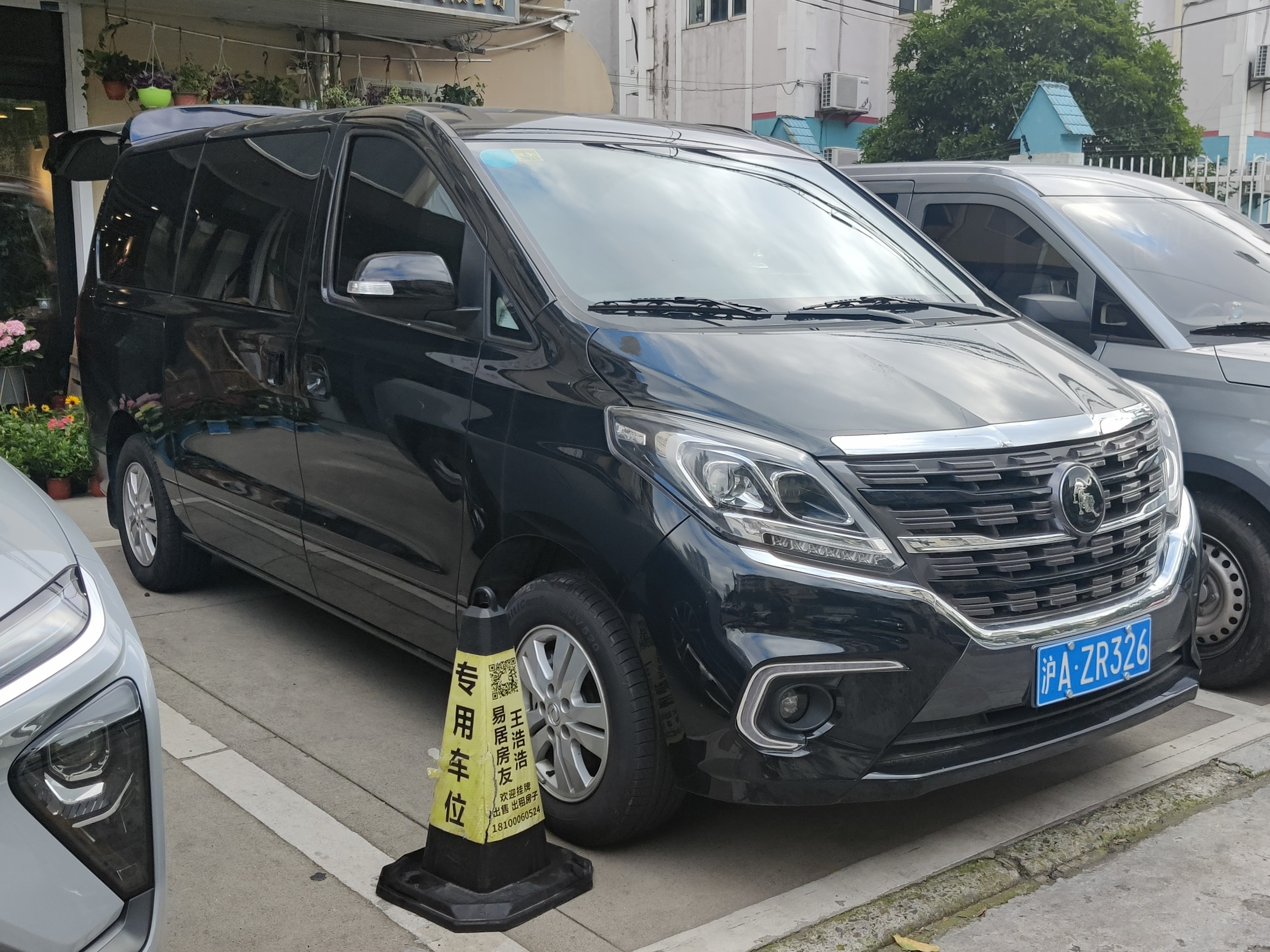
Forthing M7

=== Discontinued models ===
- Forthing T5L (2019–2021), mid-size SUV
- Forthing S60 EV (2016–2024), compact sedan
- Forthing Jingyi S50 (2021–2023), subcompact Sedan
- Forthing Jingyi X3 (2014–2019), subcompact SUV
- Forthing Jingyi X5 (2013–2021), compact SUV
- Forthing Jingyi X6 (2016–2017), mid-size SUV
- Forthing SX6 (2016–2023), mid-size SUV
- Forthing S500 (2016–2017), compact MPV
- Forthing F600 (2016–2019), full size MPV
- Forthing CM7 (2014–2018), full-size MPV
- Forthing M6 (2019–2020), compact MPV
- Forthing Jingyi (2007–2015), compact MPV
  - Forthing Jingyi SUV (2012–2013), SUV variant
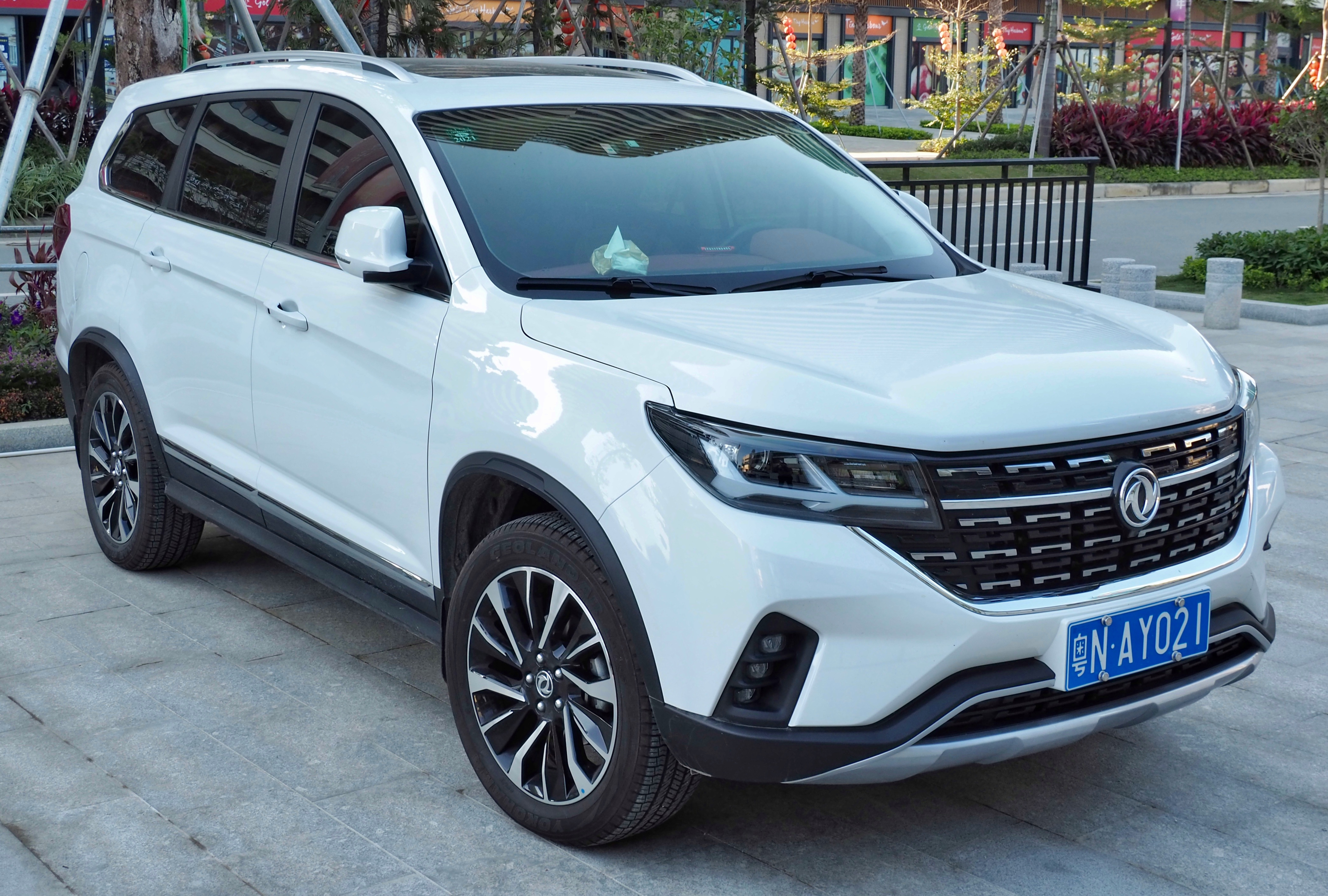
Forthing T5L

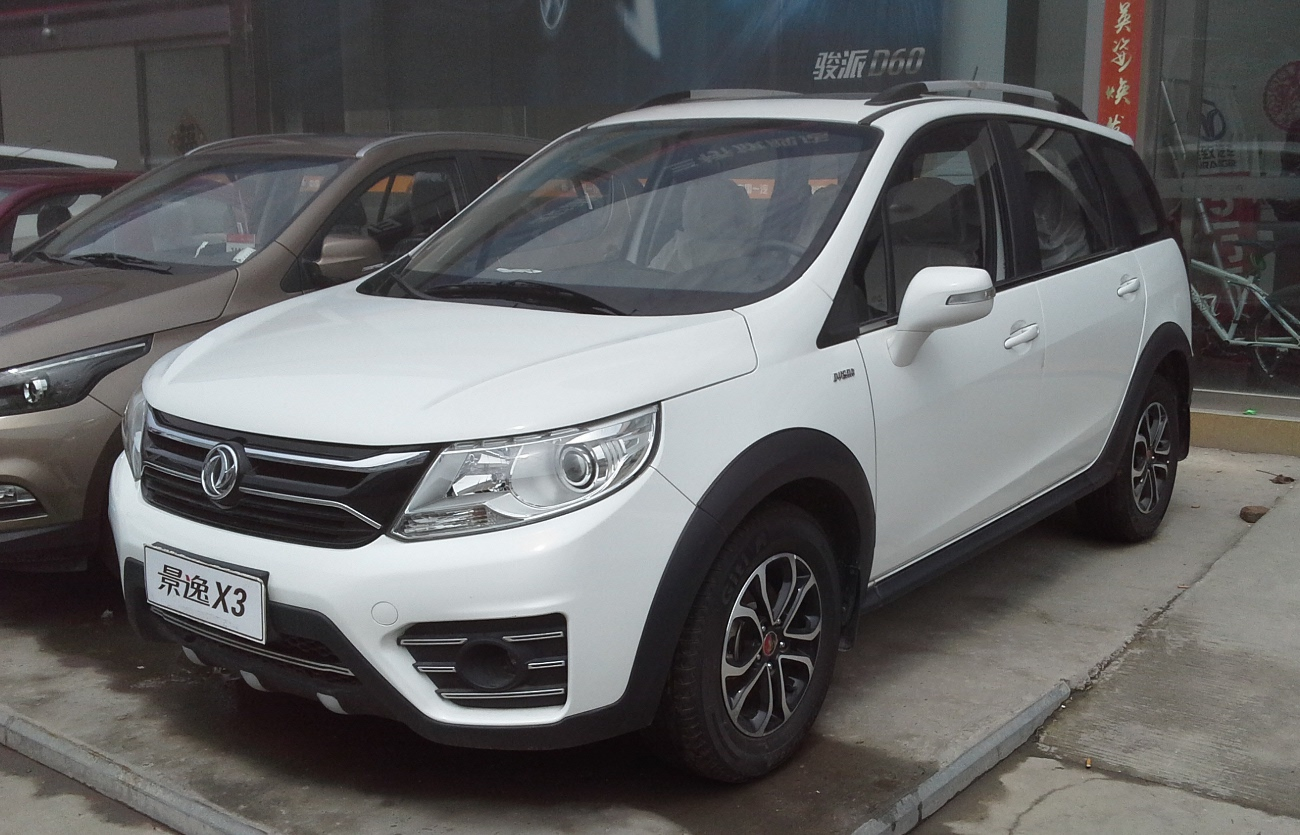
Forthing Jingyi X3

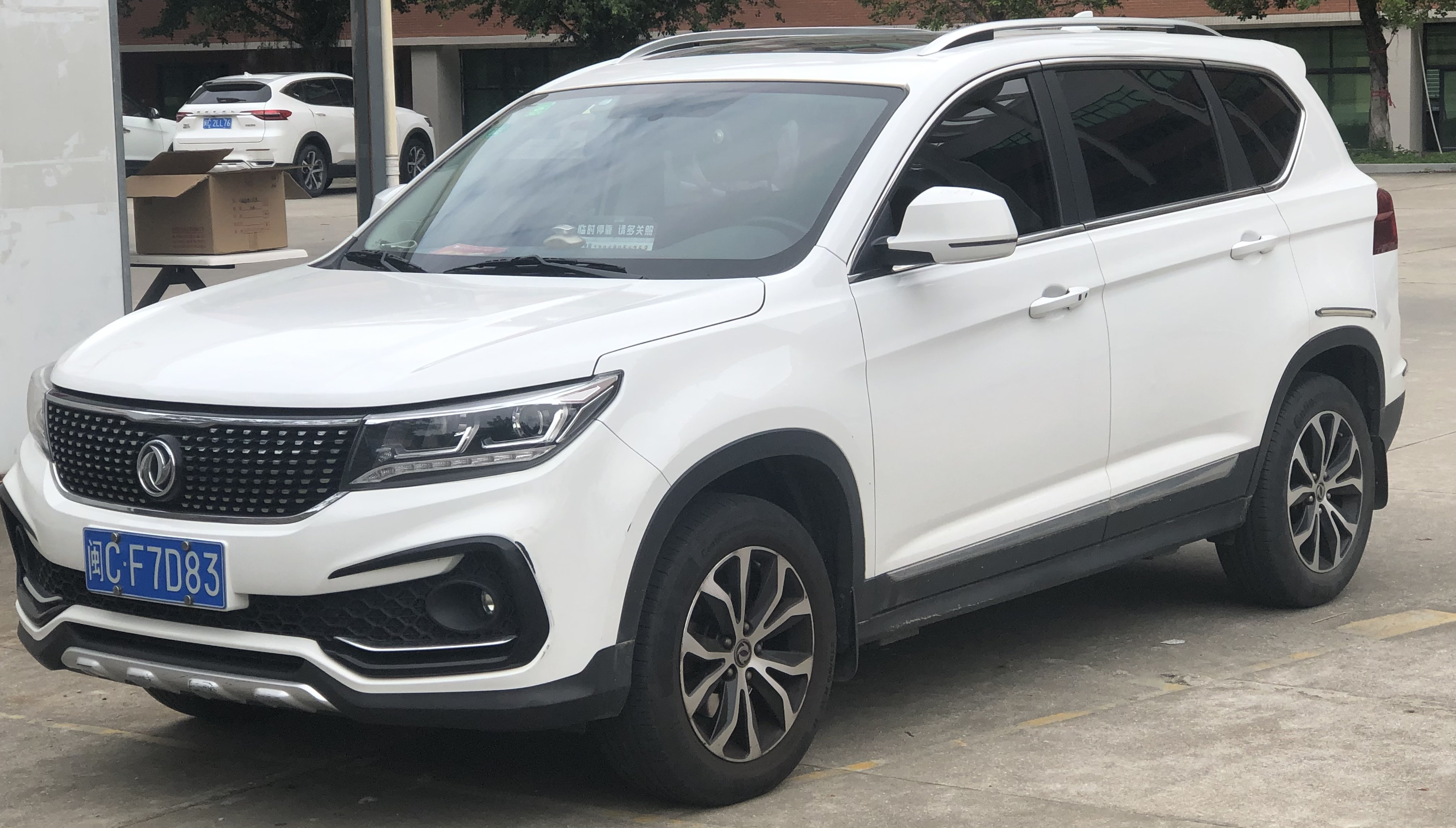
Forthing Jingyi X5

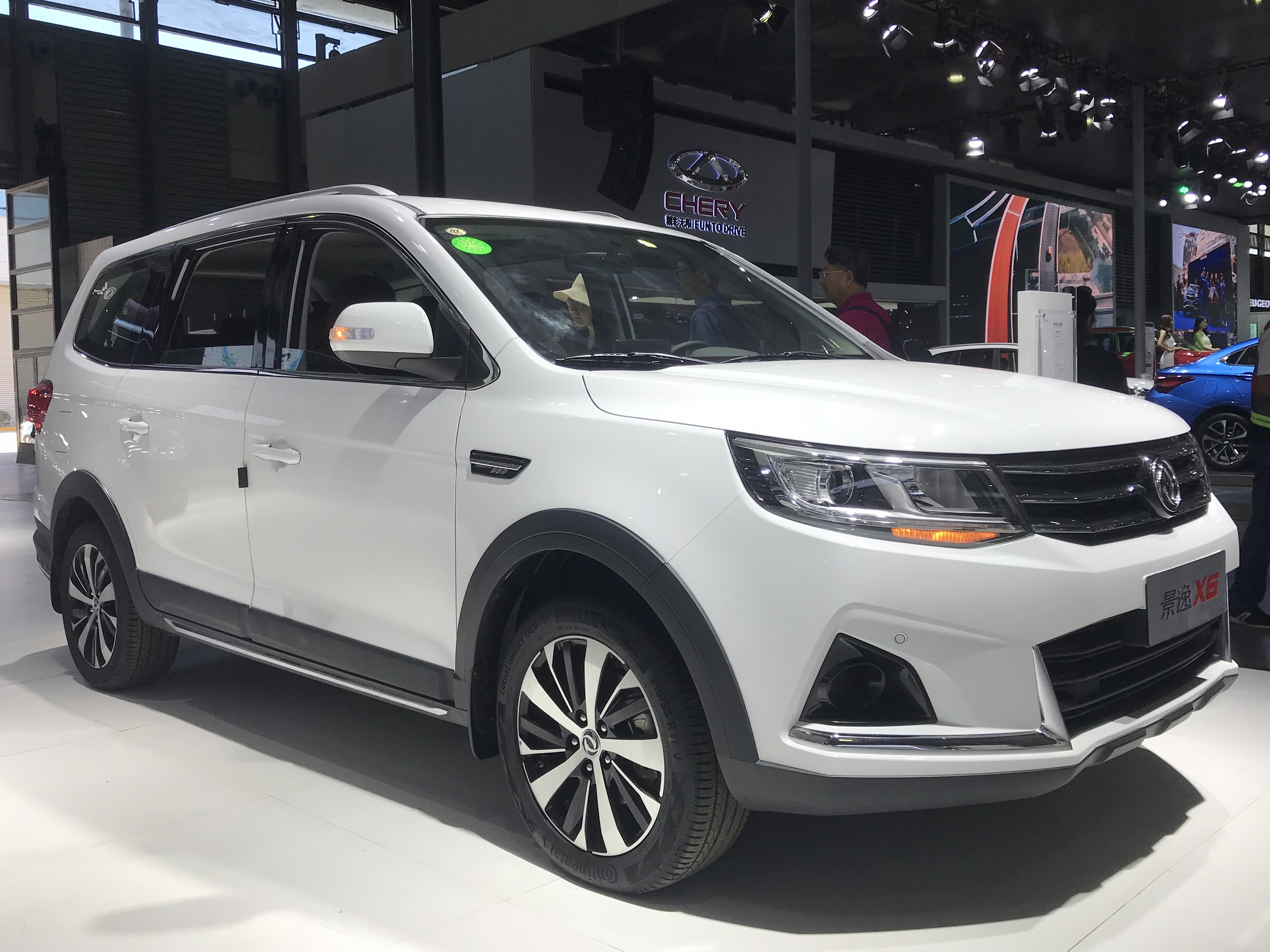
Forthing Jingyi X6

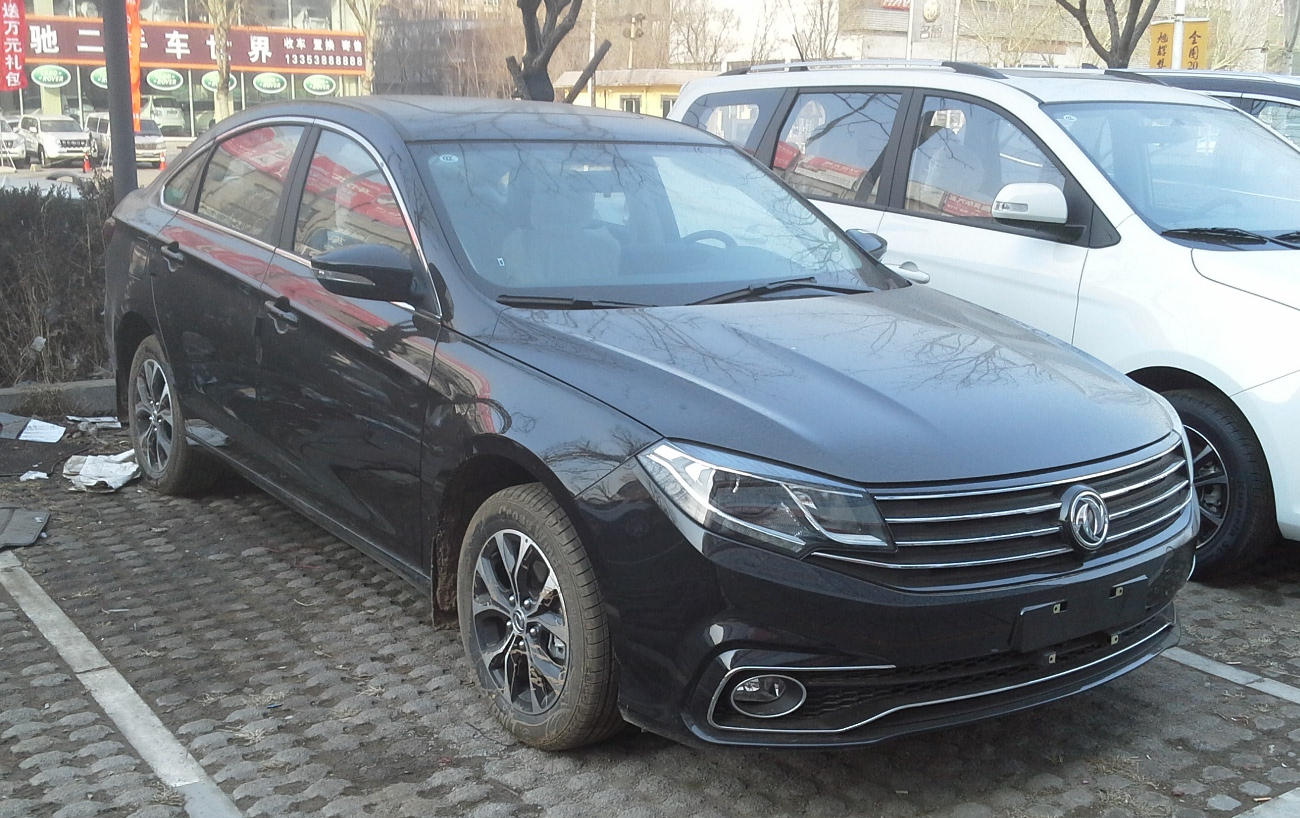
Forthing Jingyi S50

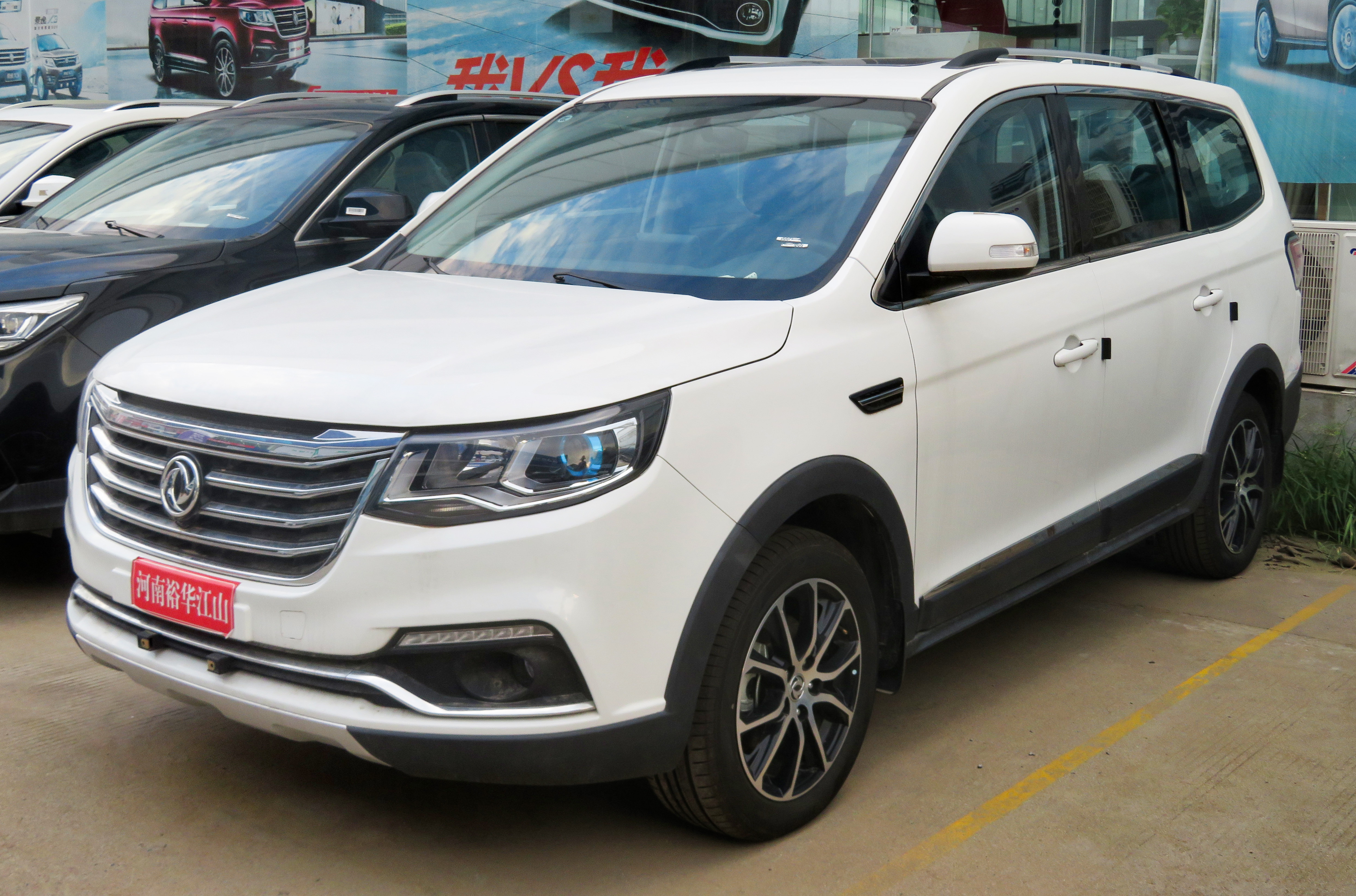
Forthing SX6

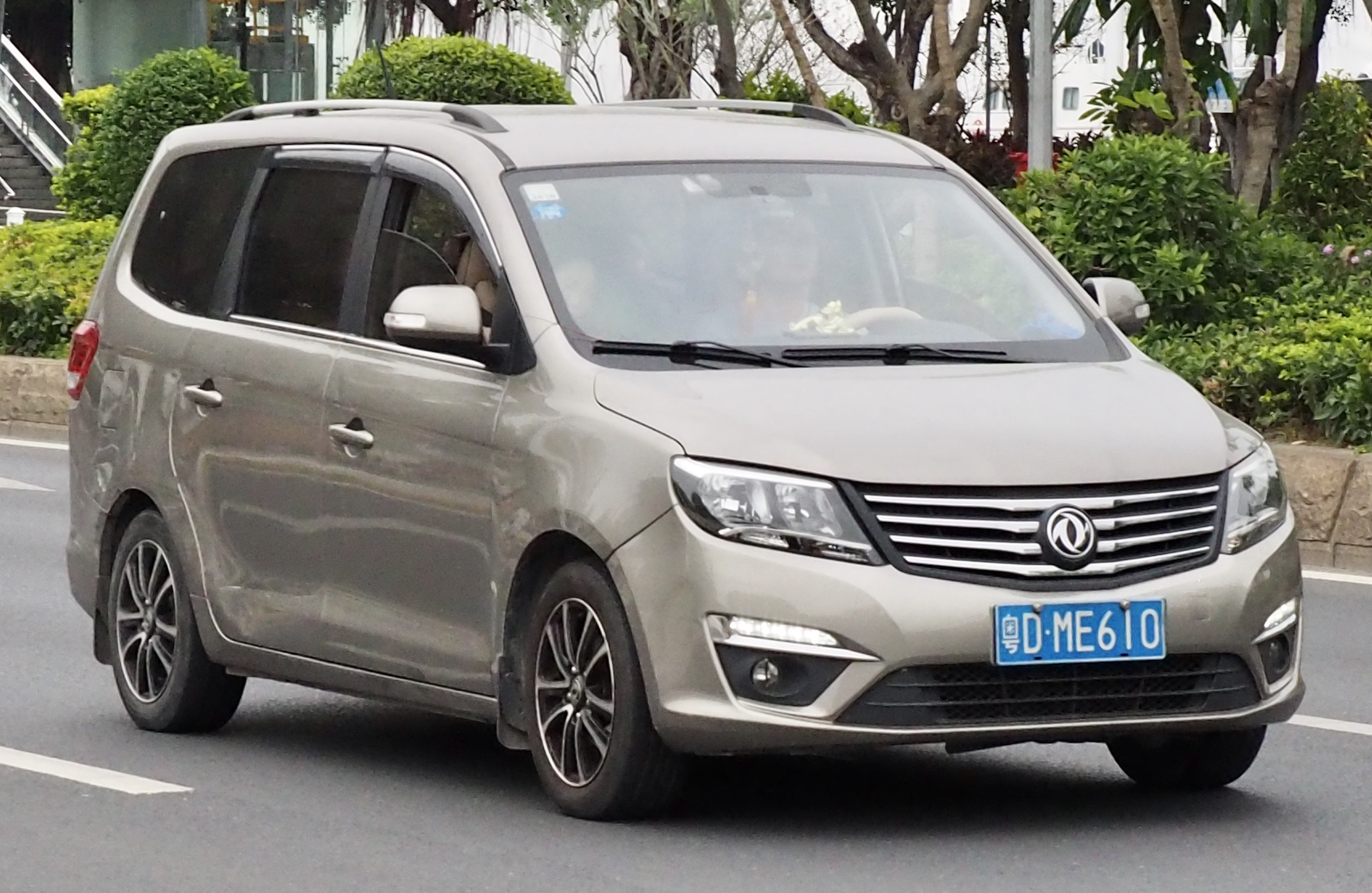
Forthing S500

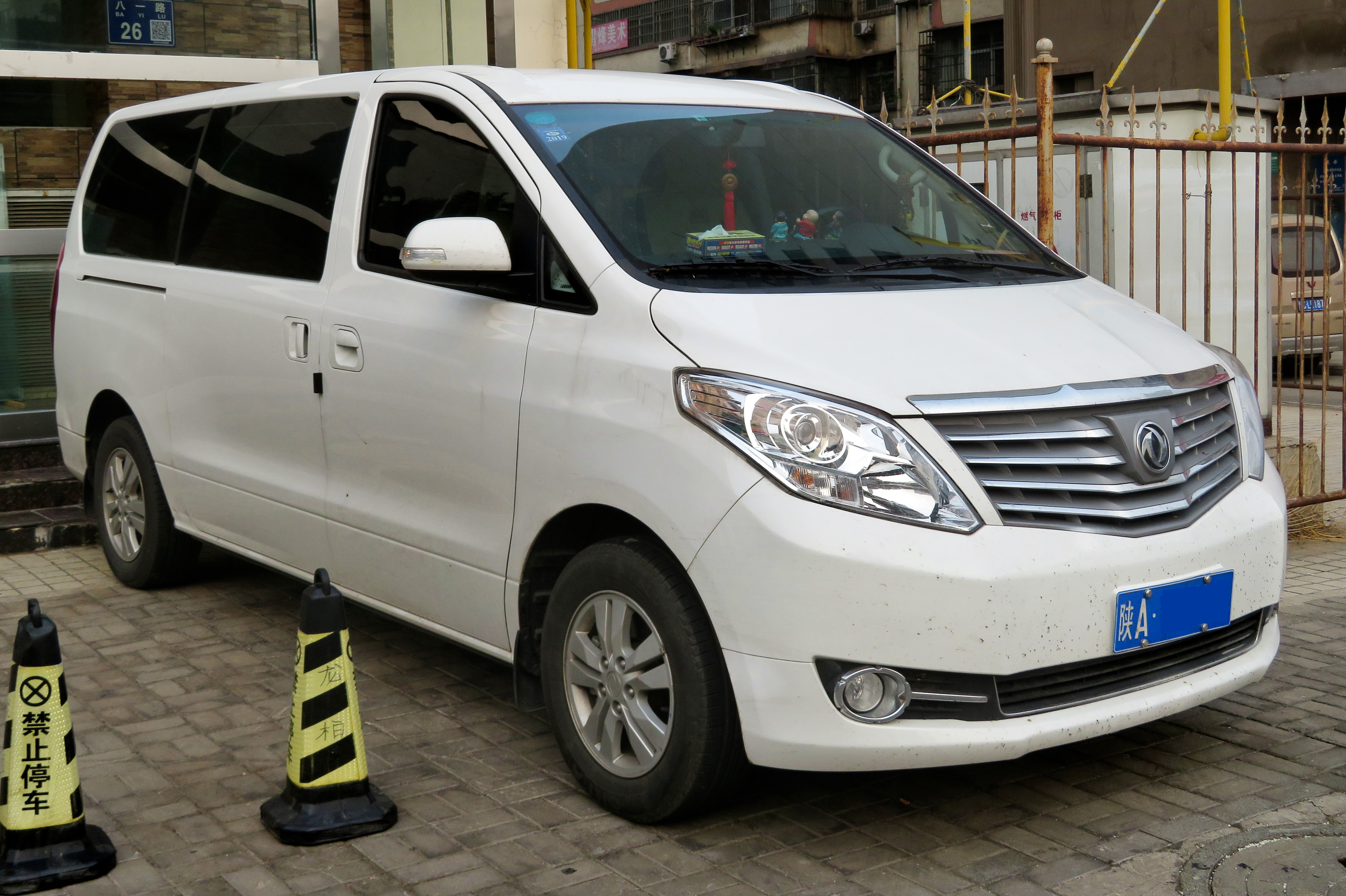
Forthing CM7

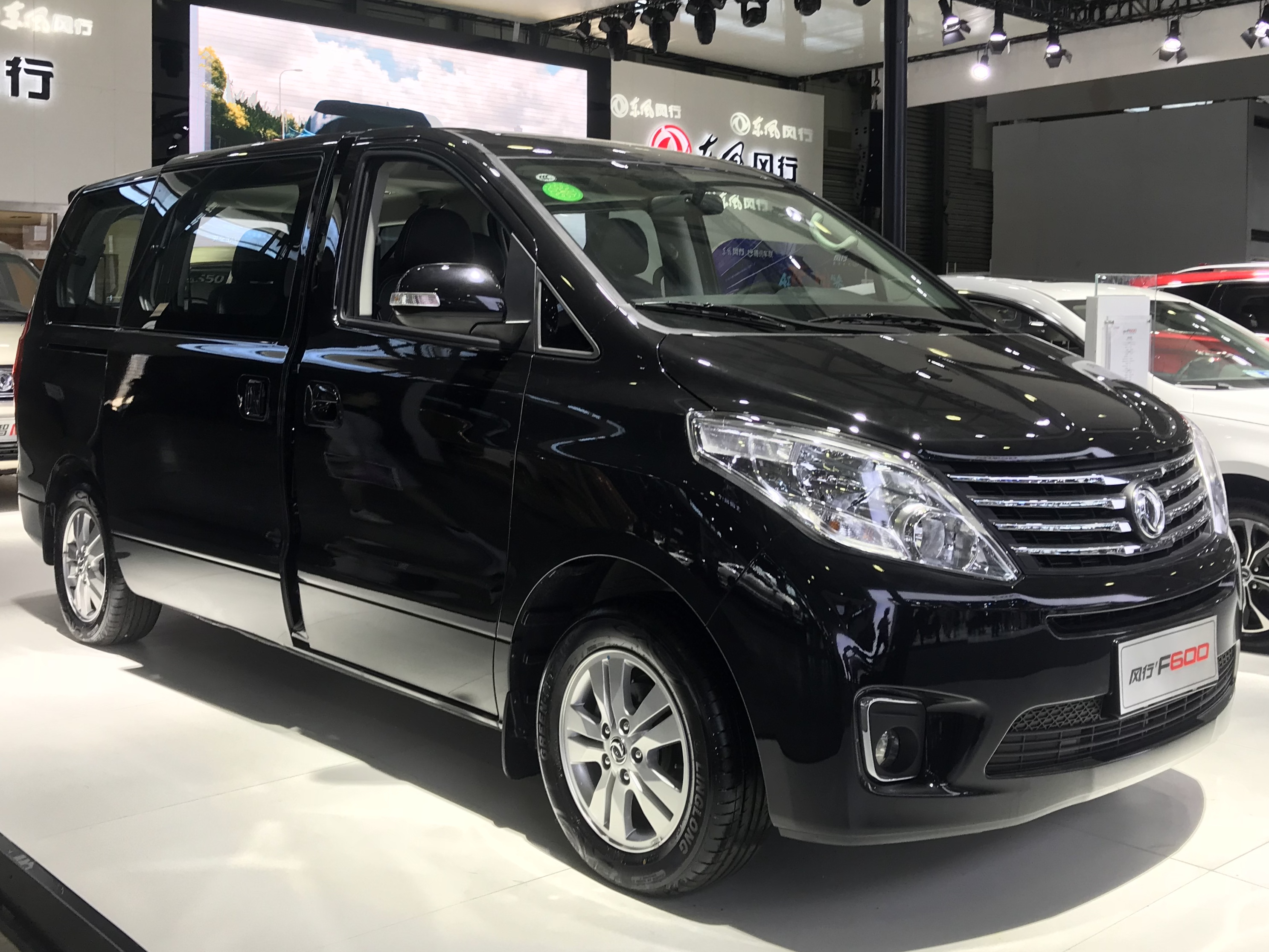
Forthing F600

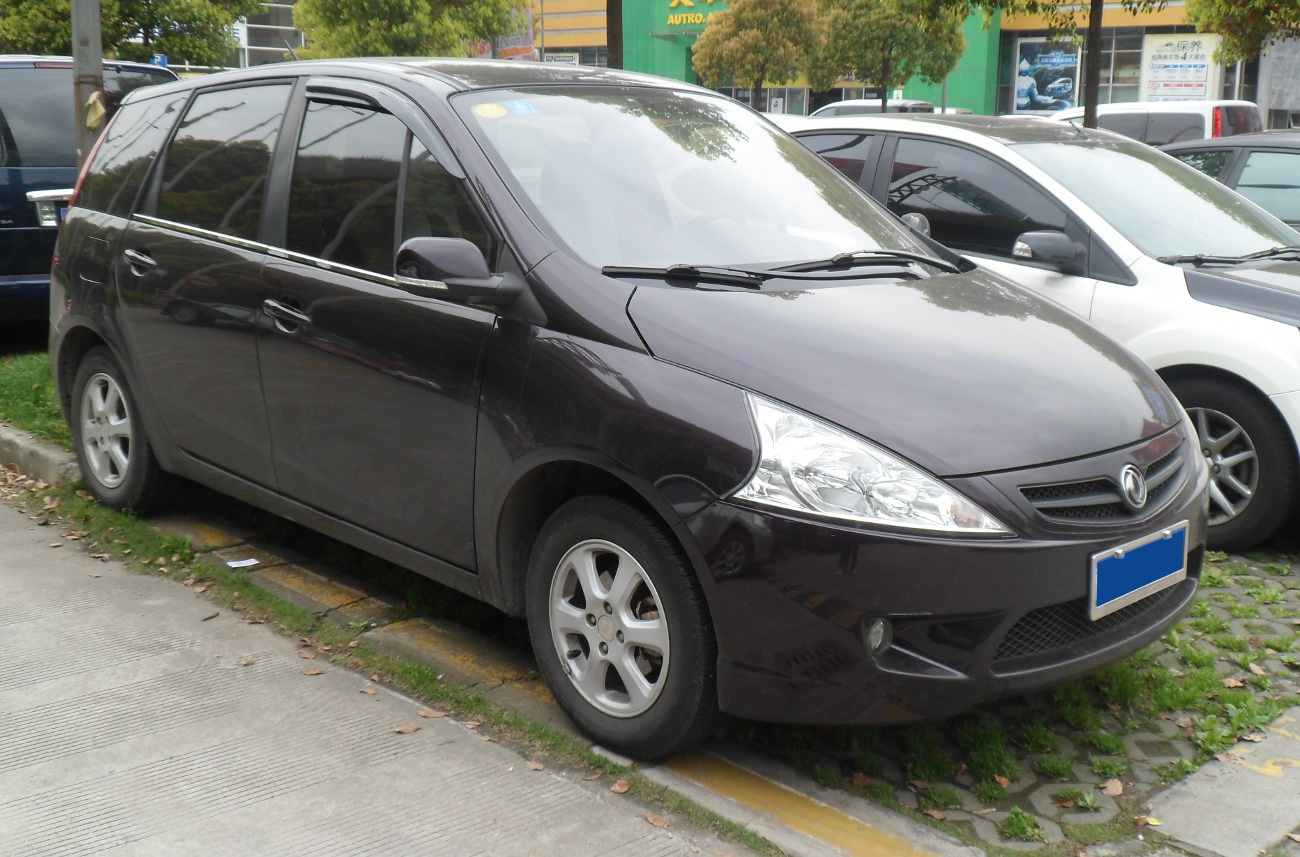
Forthing Jingyi

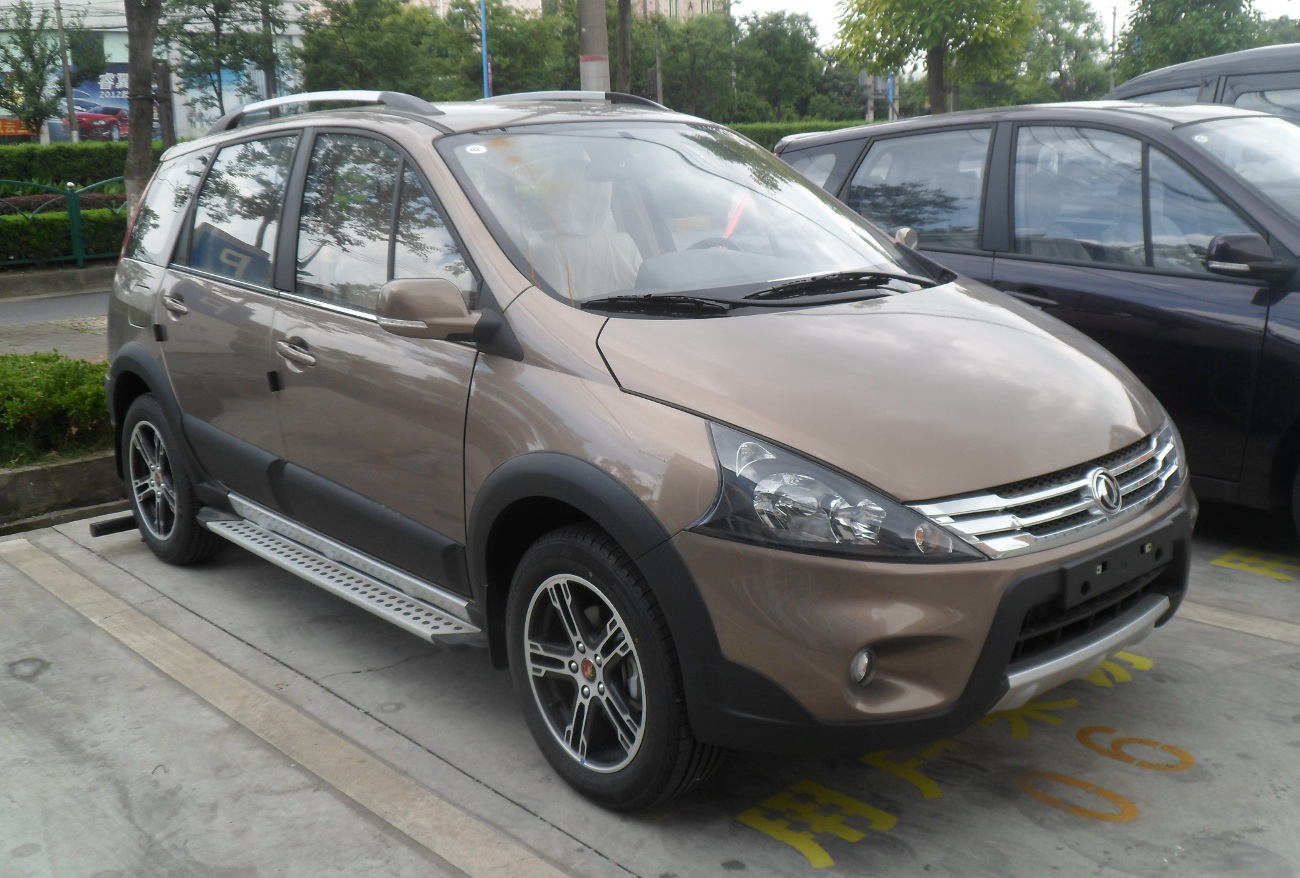
Forthing Jingyi SUV

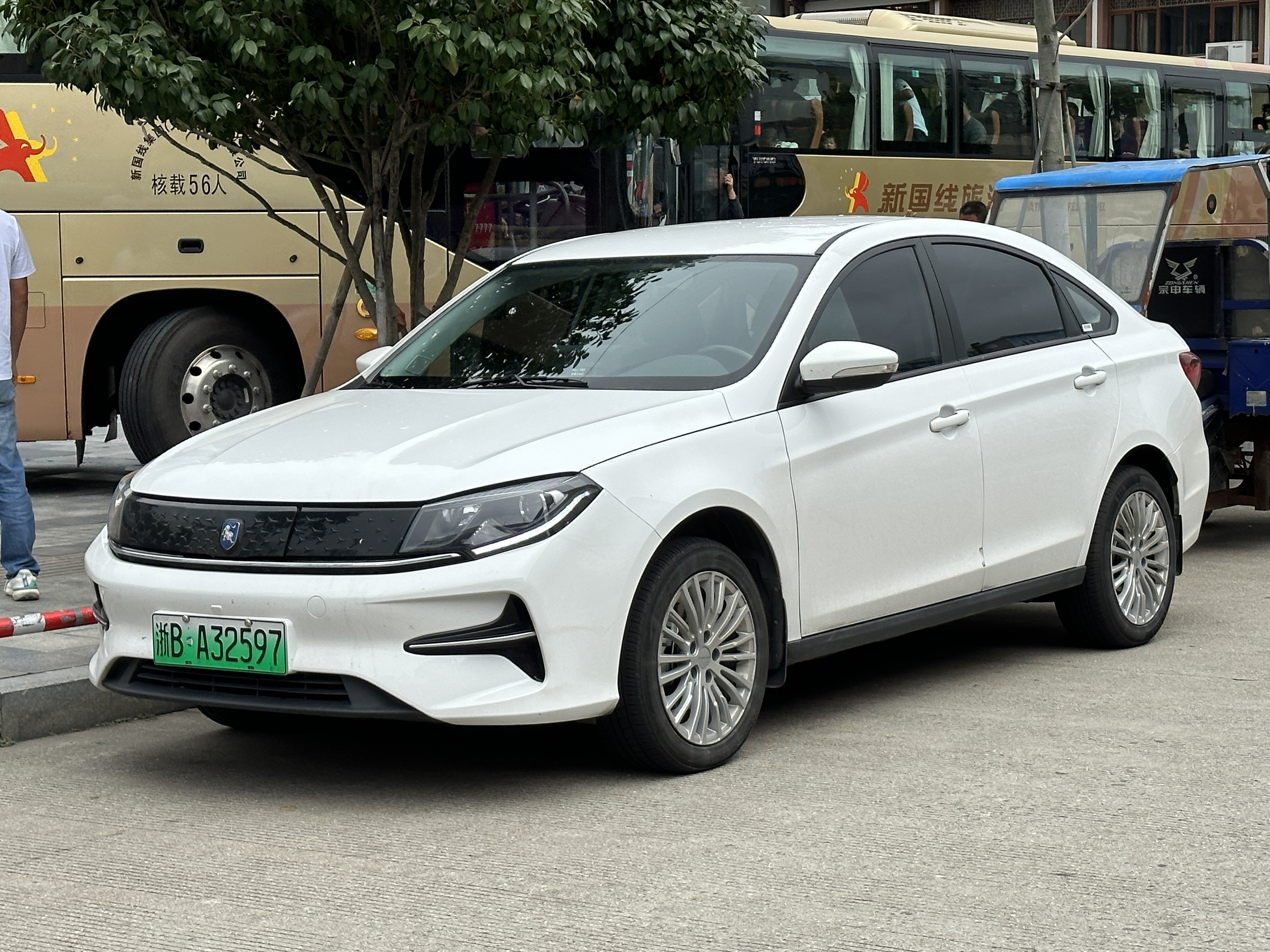
Forthing S60 EV

== See also ==
- Automobile manufacturers and brands of China
- List of automobile manufacturers of China
