= Forthing Lingzhi Plus =

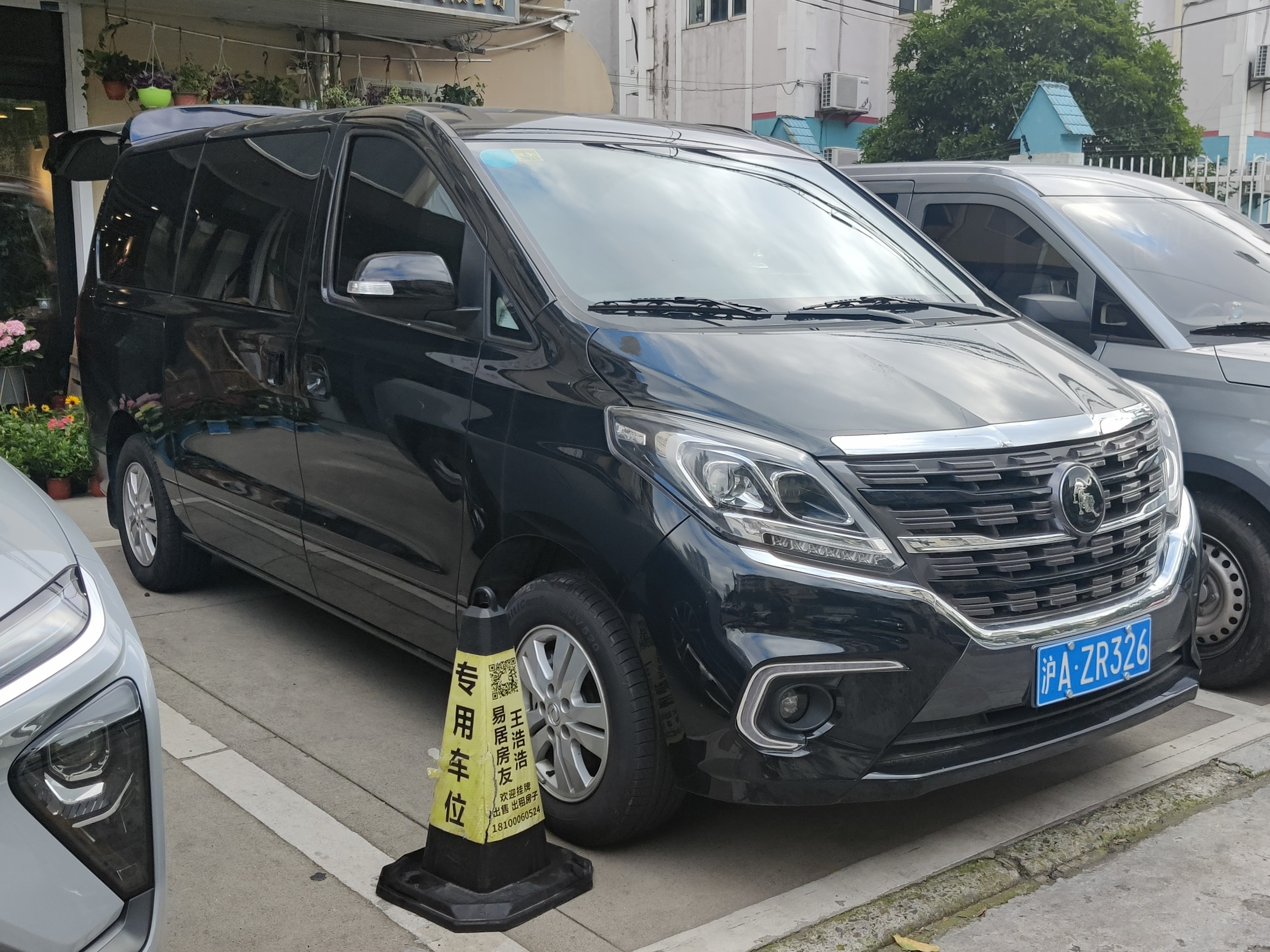

Overview
- Manufacturer: Forthing
- Also called: Forthing CM7; Forthing F600/ F600L; Forthing M7/ M6; IVM / Innoson Capa (Nigeria)
- Production: 2013–present
- Assembly: China: Liuzhou

Body and chassis
- Class: Minivan
- Body style: 5-door minivan
- Layout: FR layout

Powertrain
- Engine: 2.4 L Mitsubishi 4G69 I4; 2.0 L turbo I4 Diesel engine
- Transmission: 5-speed manual

Dimensions
- Wheelbase: 3,200 mm (126.0 in); 3,198 mm (125.9 in) (Forthing M7)
- Length: 5,150 mm (202.8 in); 5,170 mm (203.5 in) (Forthing M7)
- Width: 1,920 mm (75.6 in)
- Height: 1,925 mm (75.8 in); 1,930 mm (76.0 in) (Forthing M7)

The Forthing Lingzhi Plus is a minivan produced by Dongfeng Liuzhou Motor under the Forthing or, originally, the Dongfeng Fengxing sub-brand.

== Overview ==
Originally named the Fengxing CM7, the first model debuted at the 2013 Shanghai Auto Show and was launched in the market later in the same year. The Fengxing CM7 is powered by a Mitsubishi 4G69 2.4 liter inline-4 engine producing 150hp mated to a 5-speed manual gearbox. A variant will also be available with a 2.0 liter turbocharged diesel engine, mated to the same 5-speed manual gearbox. The styling of the body was heavily inspired by the second generation Hyundai Starex with a front DRG design inspired by the second generation Toyota Alphard.

Prices of the Dongfeng Fengxing CM7 ranges from 129,900 yuan to 173,900 yuan in China at launch. Later in the market, the price range was adjusted to a range from 118,900 yuan to 229,900 yuan.

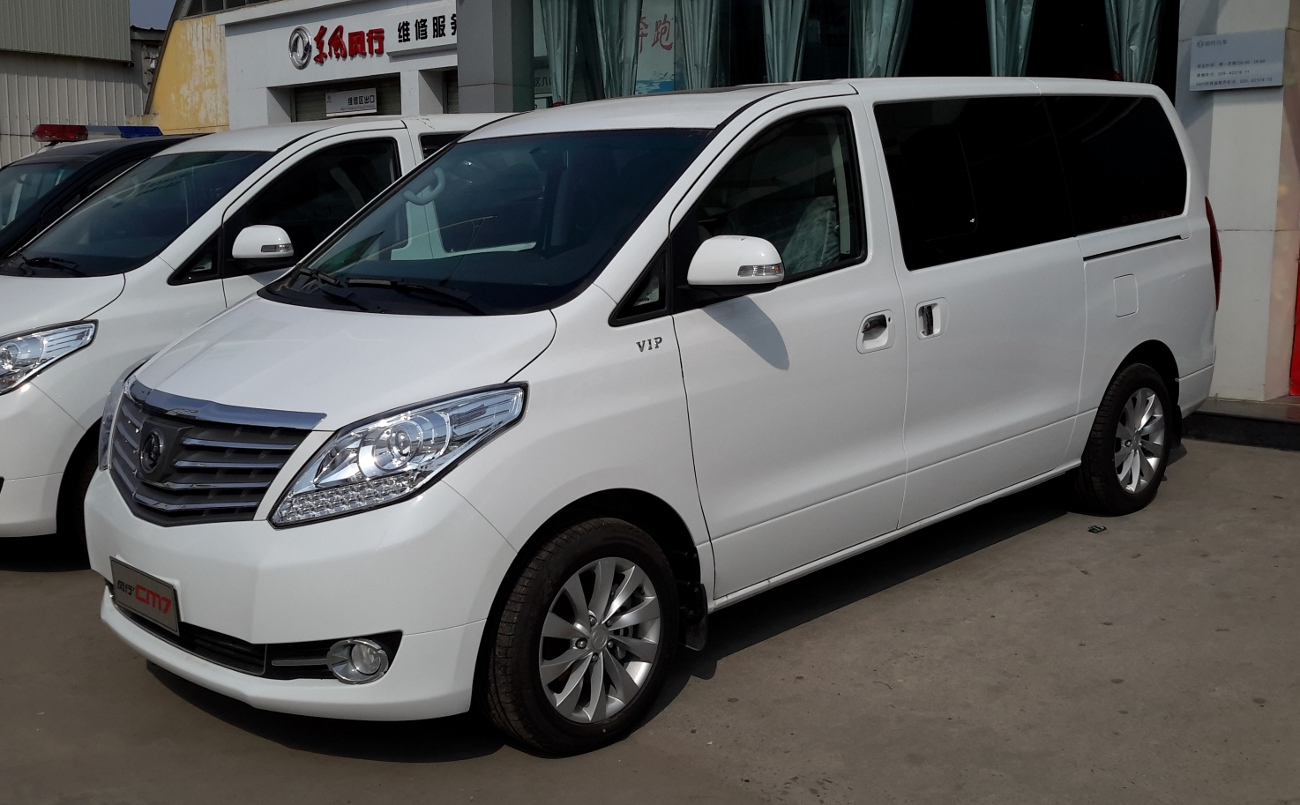
Forthing CM7

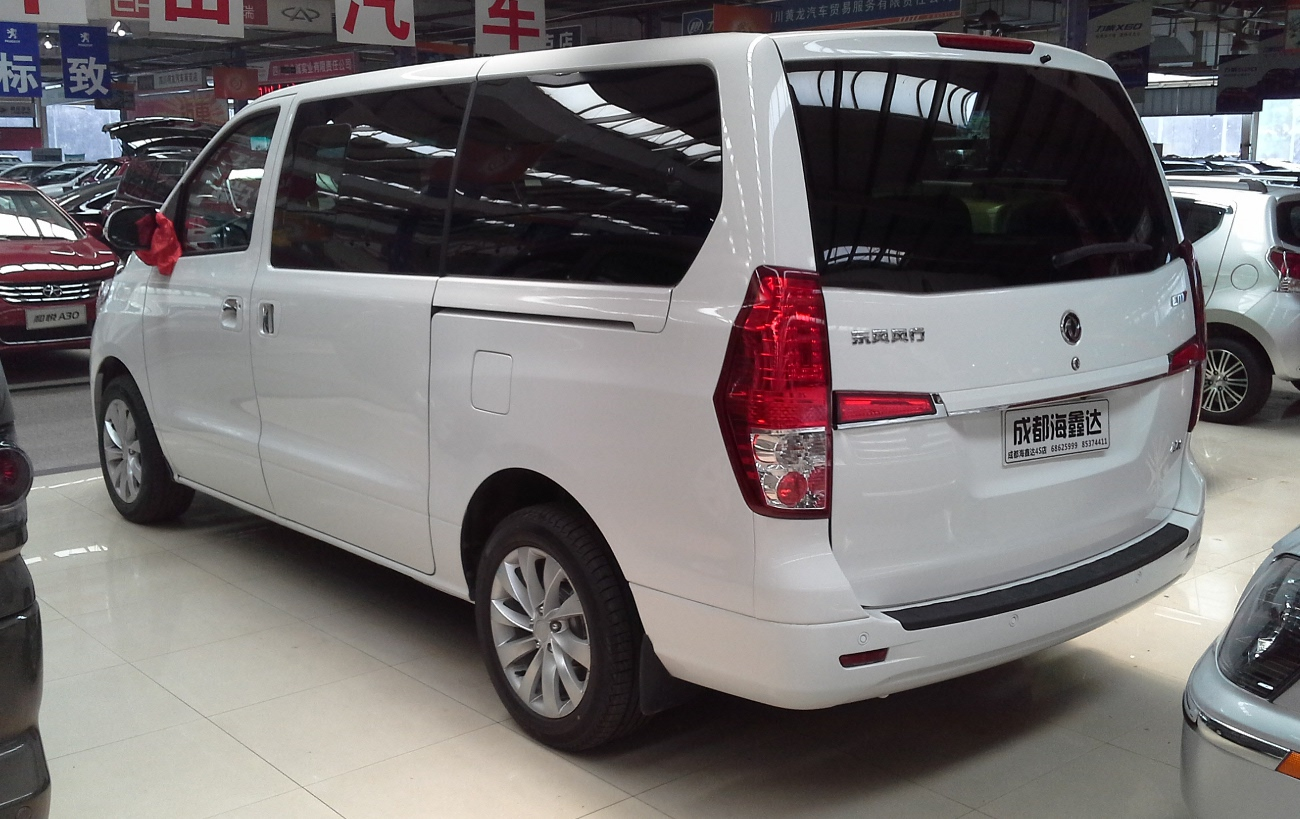
Rear view

== Forthing F600 (2016–2019) ==
A cheaper trim was also available from 2016 to 2019 called the Forthing F600, featuring restyled front and rear DRG designs. A facelift of the Forthing F600 was revealed in 2018 during the 2018 Beijing Auto Show.

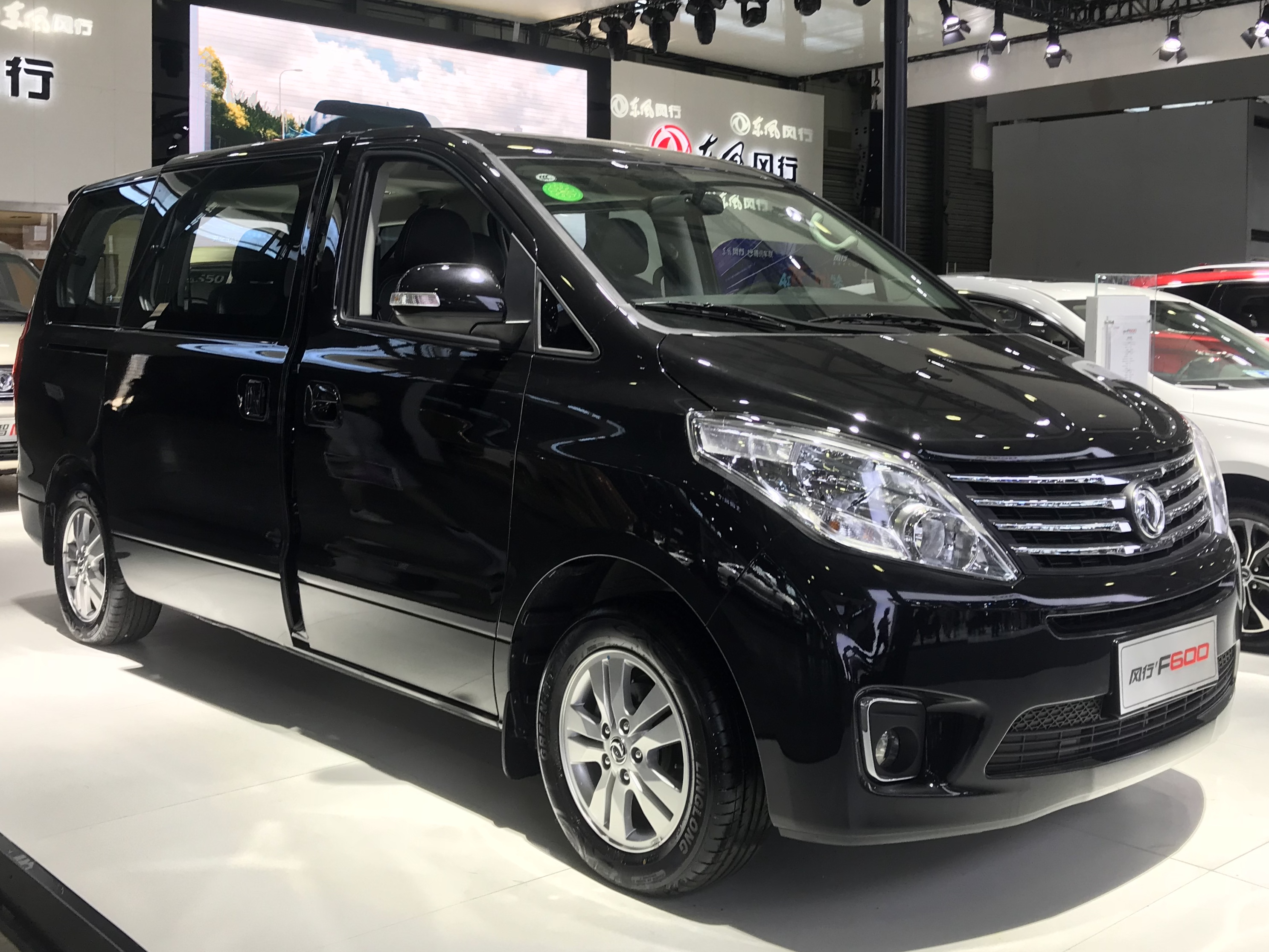
Forthing F600

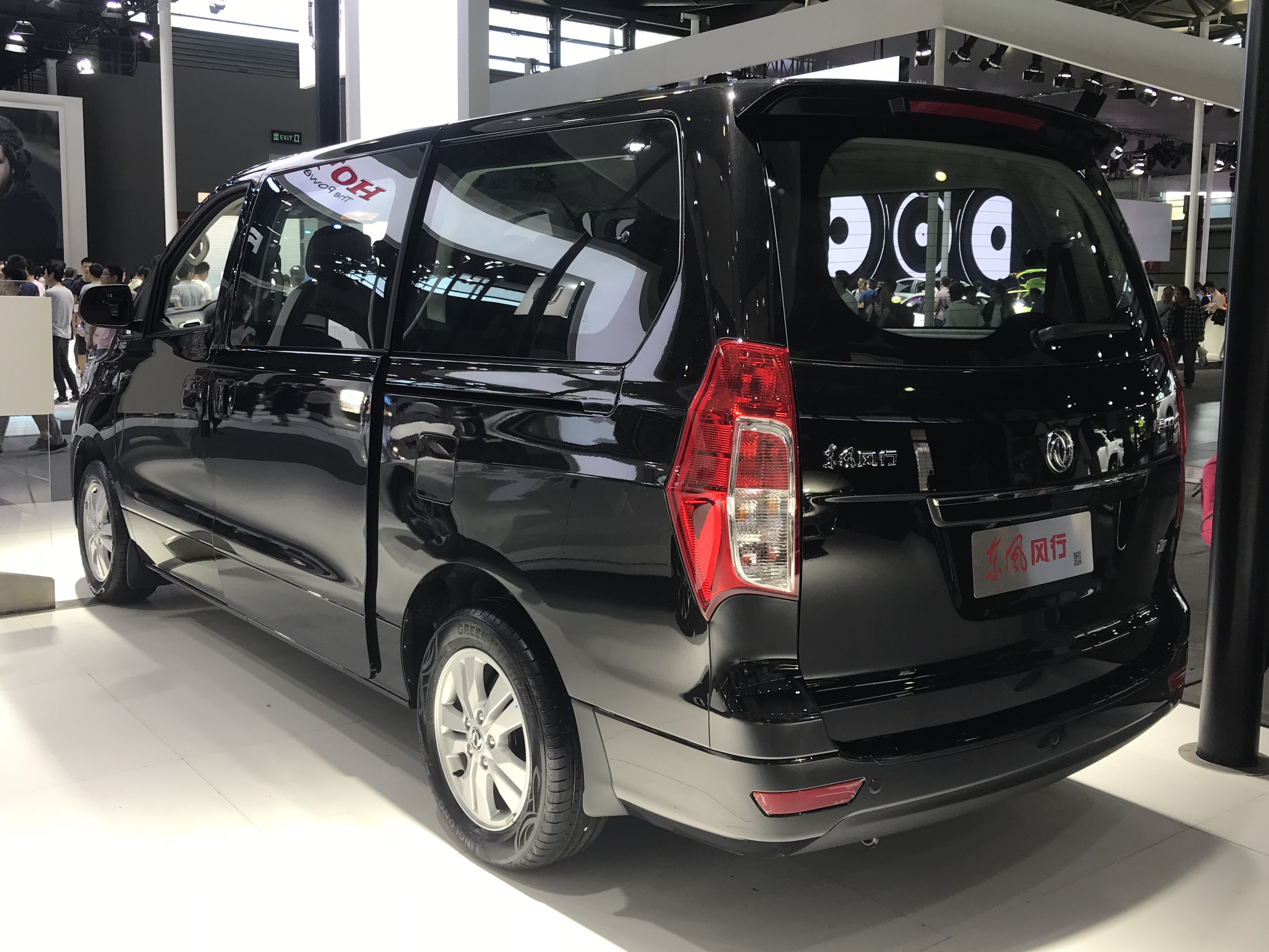
Rear view

== Forthing Lingzhi Plus (2020–) ==
As of October 2020, a variant based on the CM7 called the Forthing Lingzhi Plus was launched. Despite being named Lingzhi, the model is essentially a rebadged 7-seater CM7 and has nothing to do with the Dongfeng Fengxing Lingzhi series. The Forthing Lingzhi Plus is powered by a codenamed DFMB20AQA 2.0 liter naturally aspirated engine producing 133hp and 200 N·m mated to a 6-speed manual gearbox.

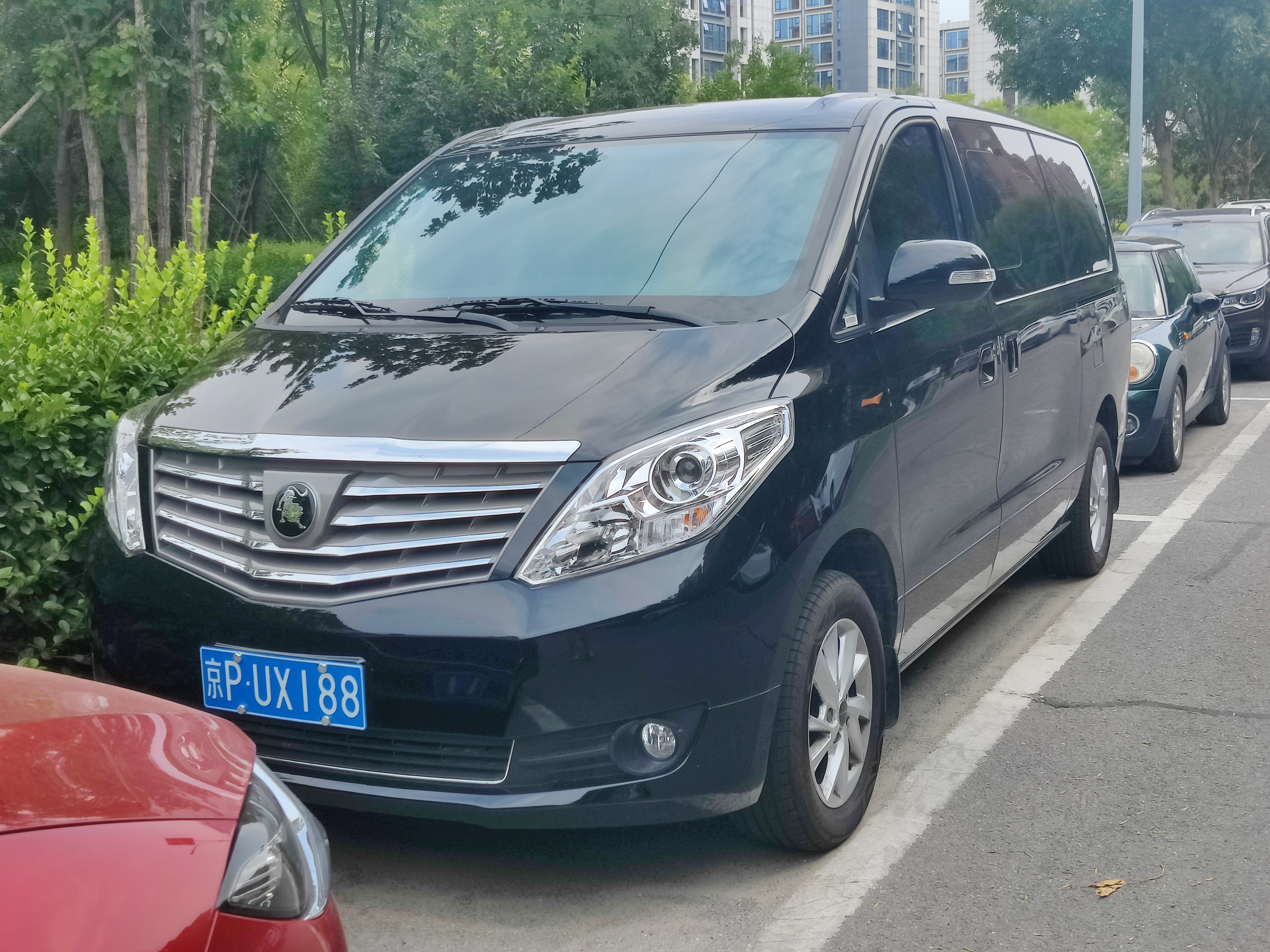
Forthing Lingzhi Plus

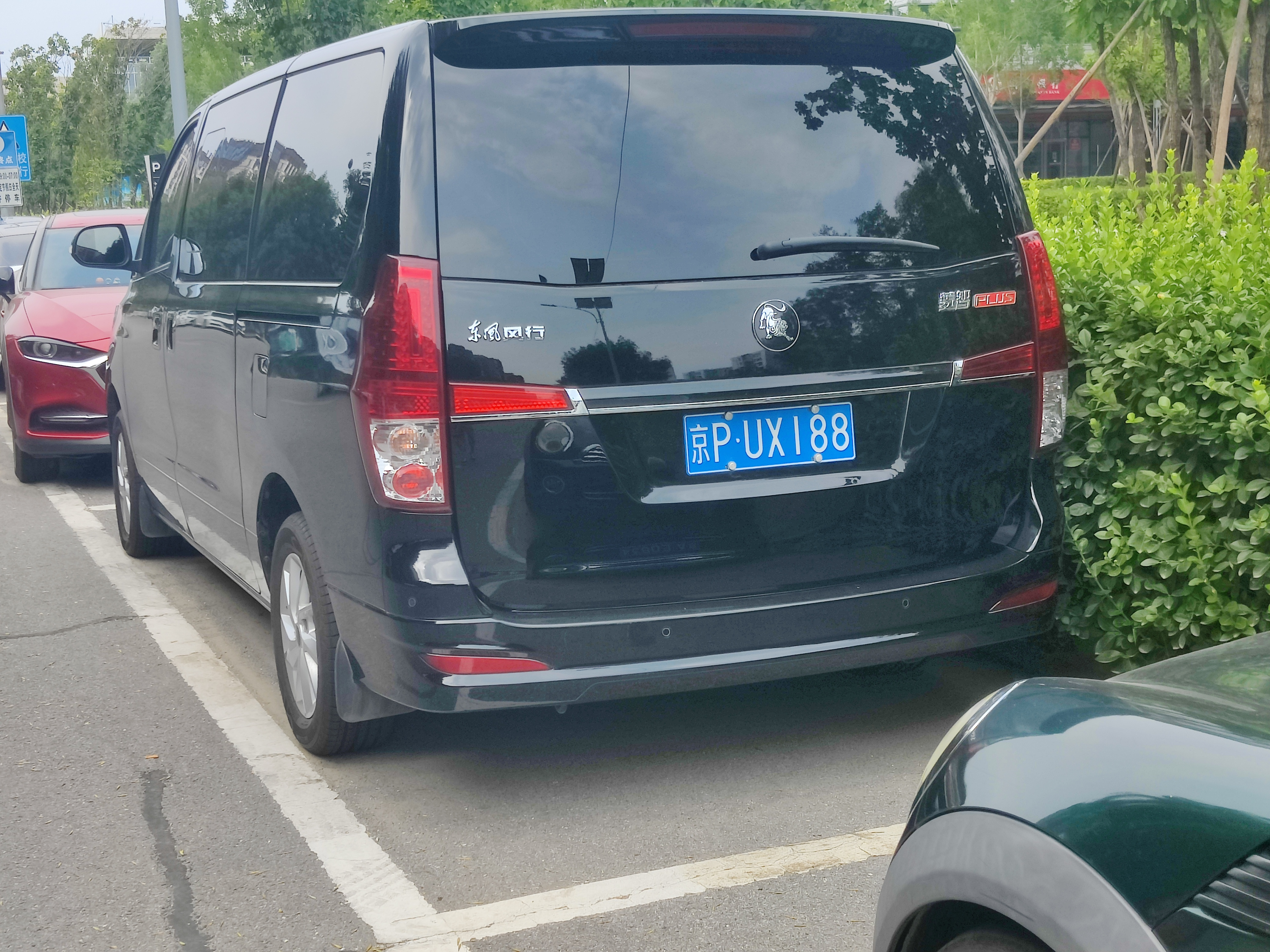
Rear view

=== 2023 facelift and CNG variant ===
The Forthing Lingzhi Plus received a facelift from the 2023 model year, and the facelift was first introduced as a CNG variant with a 180L CNG tank resulting in a combined range of 580km. The styling was later shared across the range and remained the same as of 2027 model year.

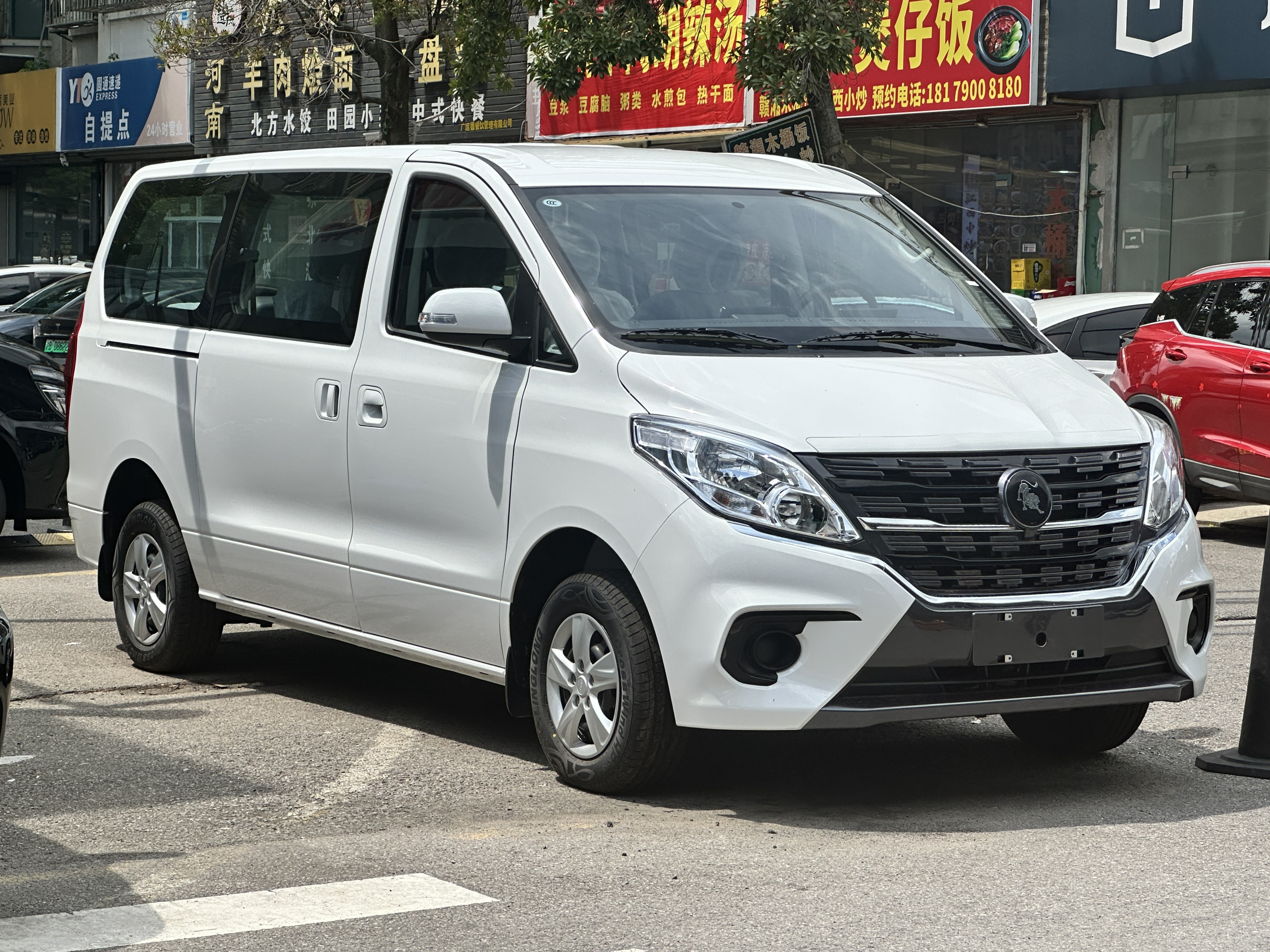
Forthing Lingzhi Plus facelift

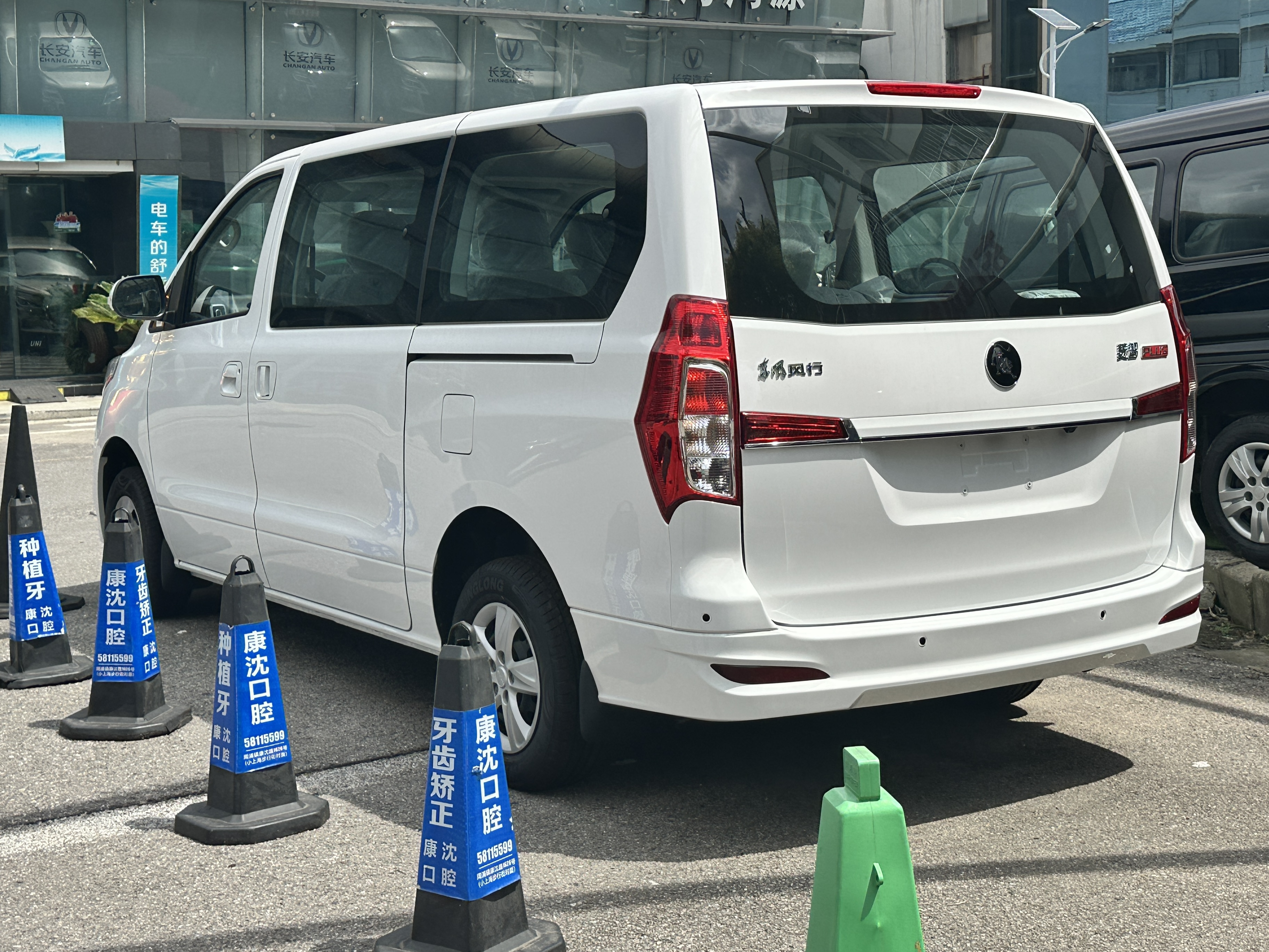
Rear view

== Forthing M7 (2022–) ==
The Forthing M7 was launched as a 2020 facelift model featuring restyled front and rear ends designed by Pininfarina. The engine powering the Forthing M7 is a 1.8 liter turbocharged engine producing 160 hp and 240 N·m. As of October 2020, the 2021 model was introduced with a slight update to the interior features and pricing.

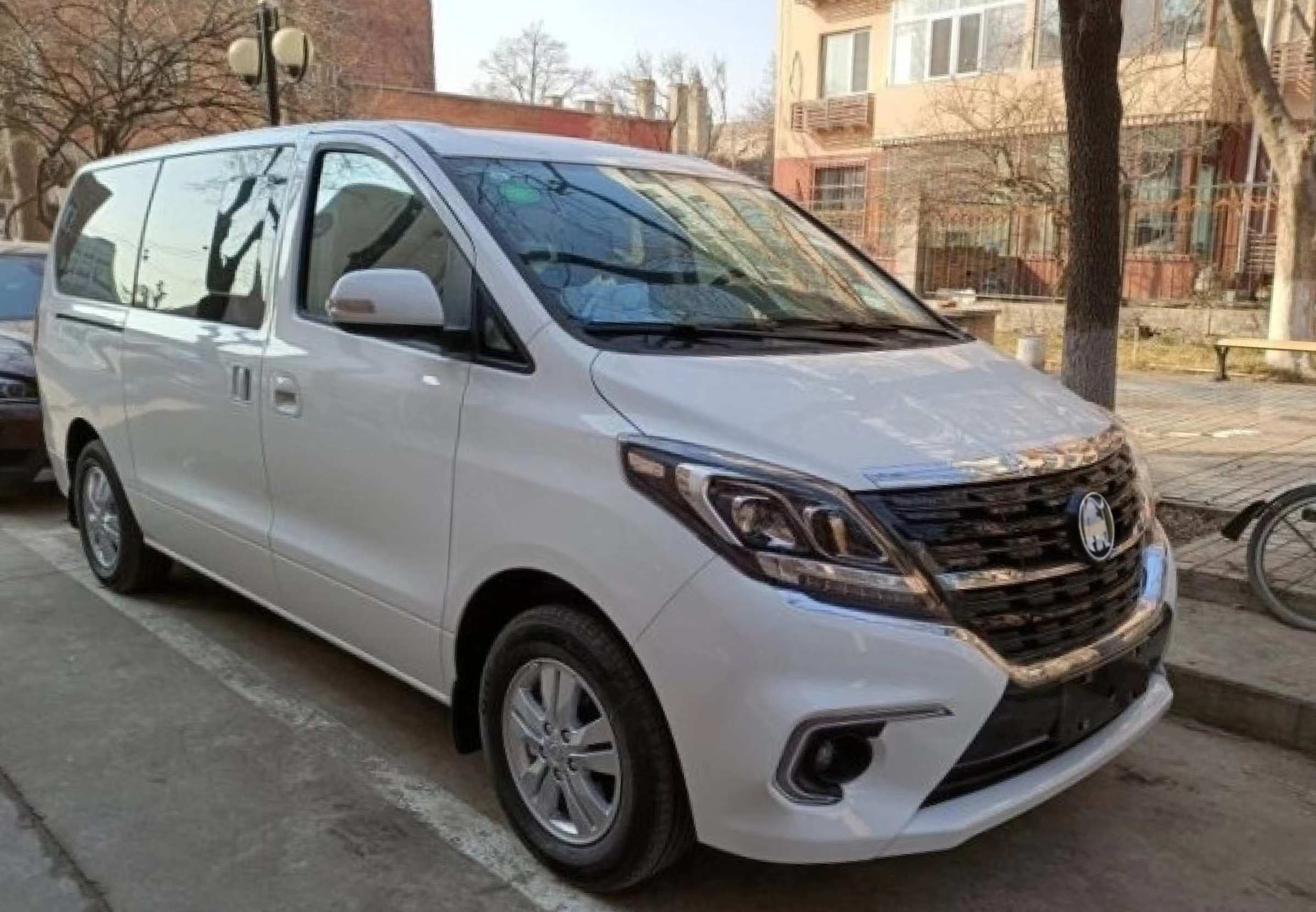
Forthing M7

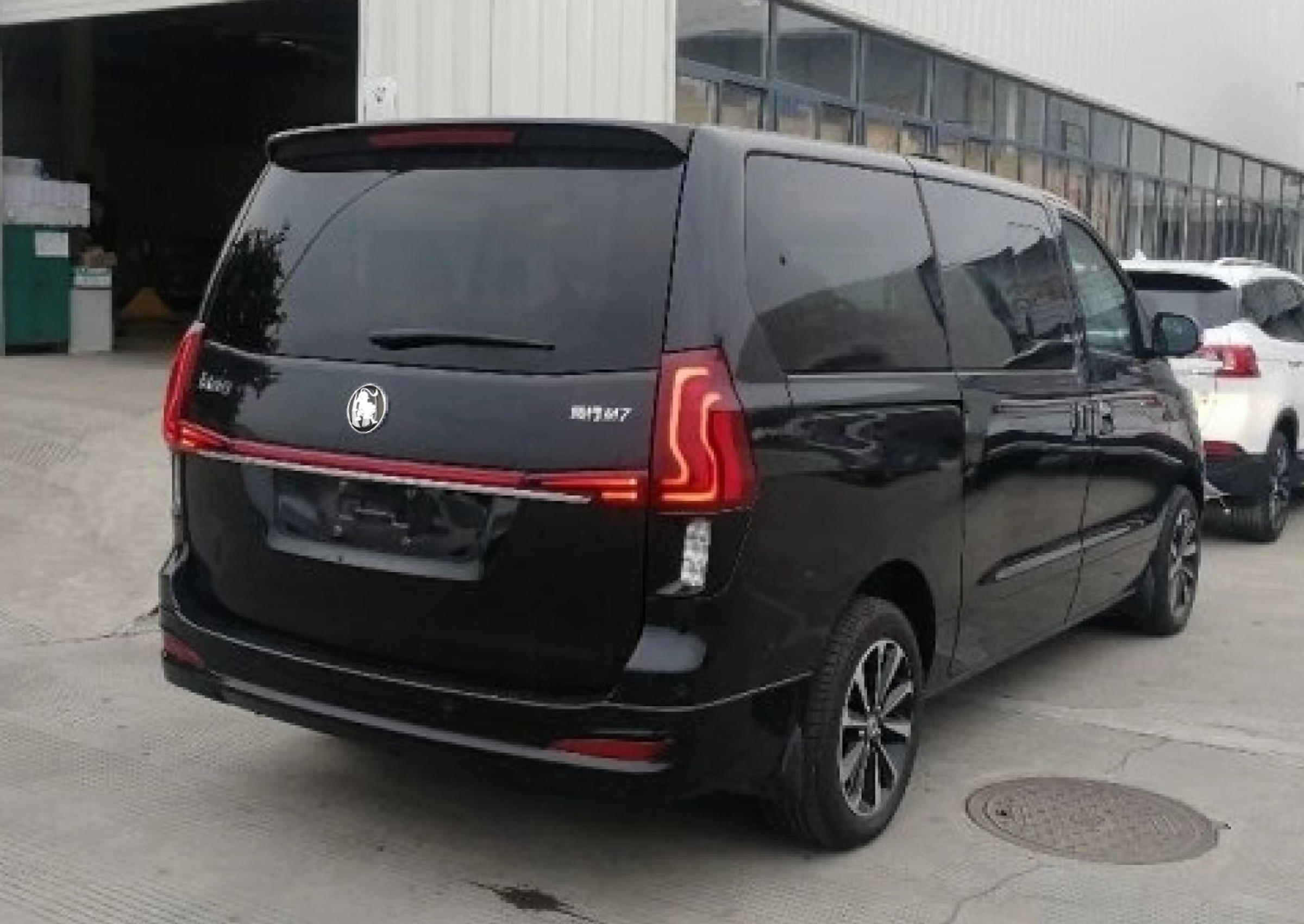
Rear view
