= Forthing Xinghai S7 =

Full-size liftback sedan

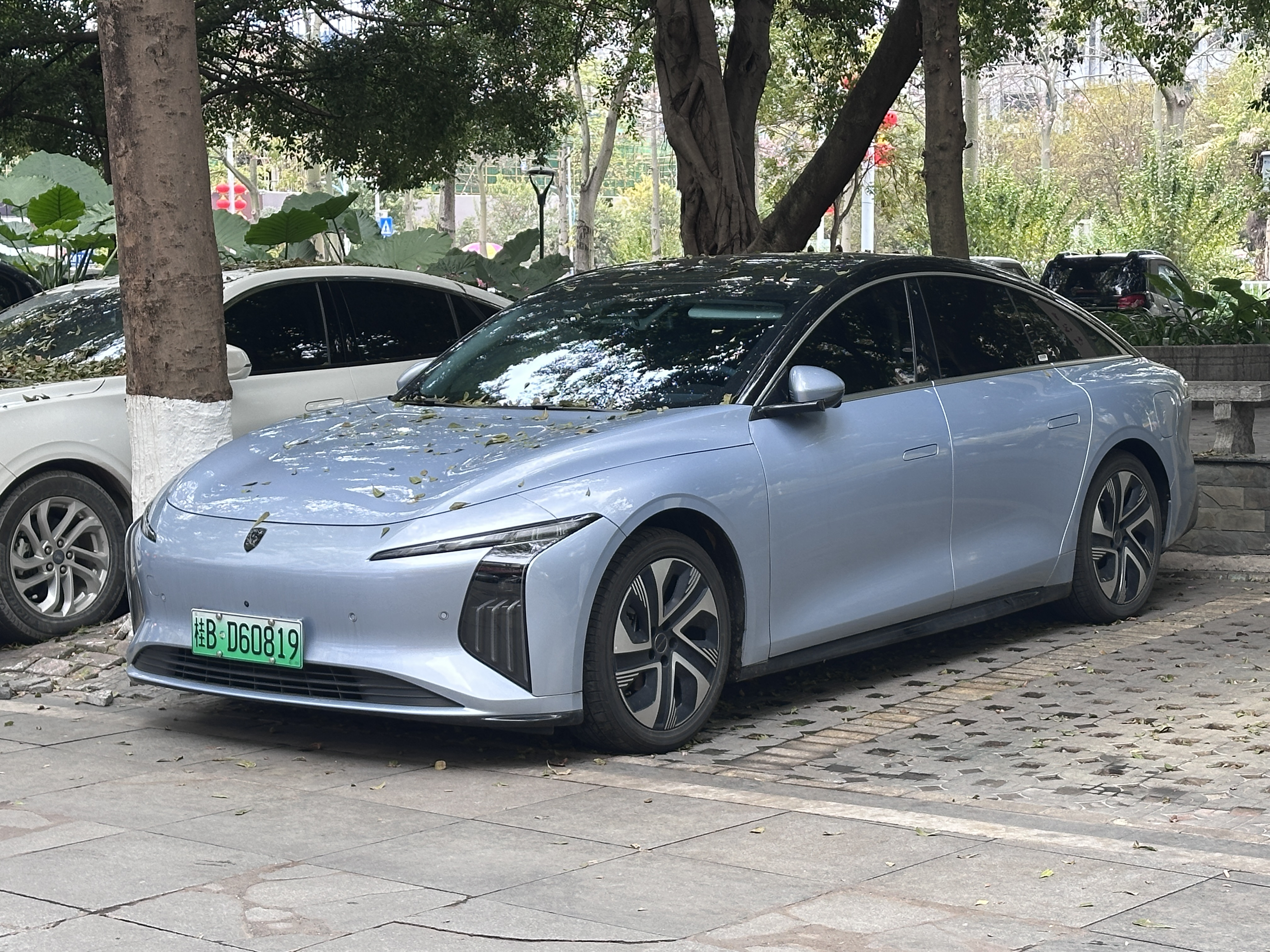

Overview
- Manufacturer: Forthing
- Also called: Forthing S7 (export); Cirelli 7zero7 (Italy)
- Production: February 2025 – present
- Assembly: China: Liuzhou

Body and chassis
- Class: Full-size car (E)
- Body style: 5-door liftback
- Layout: Rear-motor, rear-wheel-drive (EV); Front-motor, rear-wheel-drive (EREV)
- Platform: Super Cube EMA
- Related: Dongfeng eπ 007

Powertrain
- Engine: Petrol range extender: 1.5 L DFMC15DE I4
- Electric motor: Permanent magnet synchronous
- Hybrid drivetrain: Series hybrid range extender
- Battery: 28.4 kWh LFP CALB; 56.8 kWh LFP Sunwoda; 68.2 kWh LFP Sunwoda
- Range: 1,250 km (777 mi) (EREV)
- Electric range: 555–650 km (345–404 mi) (EV); 235 km (146 mi) (EREV)

Dimensions
- Wheelbase: 2,915 mm (114.8 in)
- Length: 4,935 mm (194.3 in)
- Width: 1,915 mm (75.4 in)
- Height: 1,495 mm (58.9 in)
- Curb weight: 1,730–2,105 kg (3,814–4,641 lb)

The Forthing Xinghai S7 (Chinese: 风行 星海S7; pinyin: Fengxing Xinghai S7) is a battery electric and plug-in hybrid full-size liftback sedan produced by Dongfeng Liuzhou Motor under the Forthing brand. The Xinghai S7 is the second model in the Xinghai line.

== Overview ==
Unveiled on 26 of September, 2024, the Xinghai S7 pure electric sedan was claimed to have the lowest wind resistance of any mass-produced car with a drag coefficient of Cd 0.191. The infotainment system of the Xinghai S7 provides 4G and a Wi-Fi hotspot and runs on the Xinghai OS system, which supports voice commands and gestures.

=== 2026 update ===
Unveiled on October 31, 2025, the Xinghai S7 was upgraded for the 2026 model year with a variant using an 800V electrical architecture for the 650 Ultra-Fast Charging variant. The system is capable of achieving a CLTC pure electric range of 650 kilometres (404 mi) and can replenish 320 kilometres (199 mi) of range under 14 minutes.

== Specifications ==
=== EV ===
The powertrain of the Xinghai S7 pure electric sedan is a 220 PS (162 kW; 217 hp), 310 N⋅m (229 lb⋅ft) electric motor powering the rear wheels. The battery of the pure electric version is a 56.8 kWh lithium-iron-phosphate (LFP) battery supporting a range of 555 kilometres (345 mi) under the CLTC cycle.

=== EREV ===
Launched in March 2025, the Xinghai S7 extended-range model is equipped with a 105 PS (77 kW; 104 hp) 1.5-liter inline-four engine as a range extender, providing a pure electric range of 235 kilometres (146 mi) and a combined range of 1,250 kilometres (777 mi).

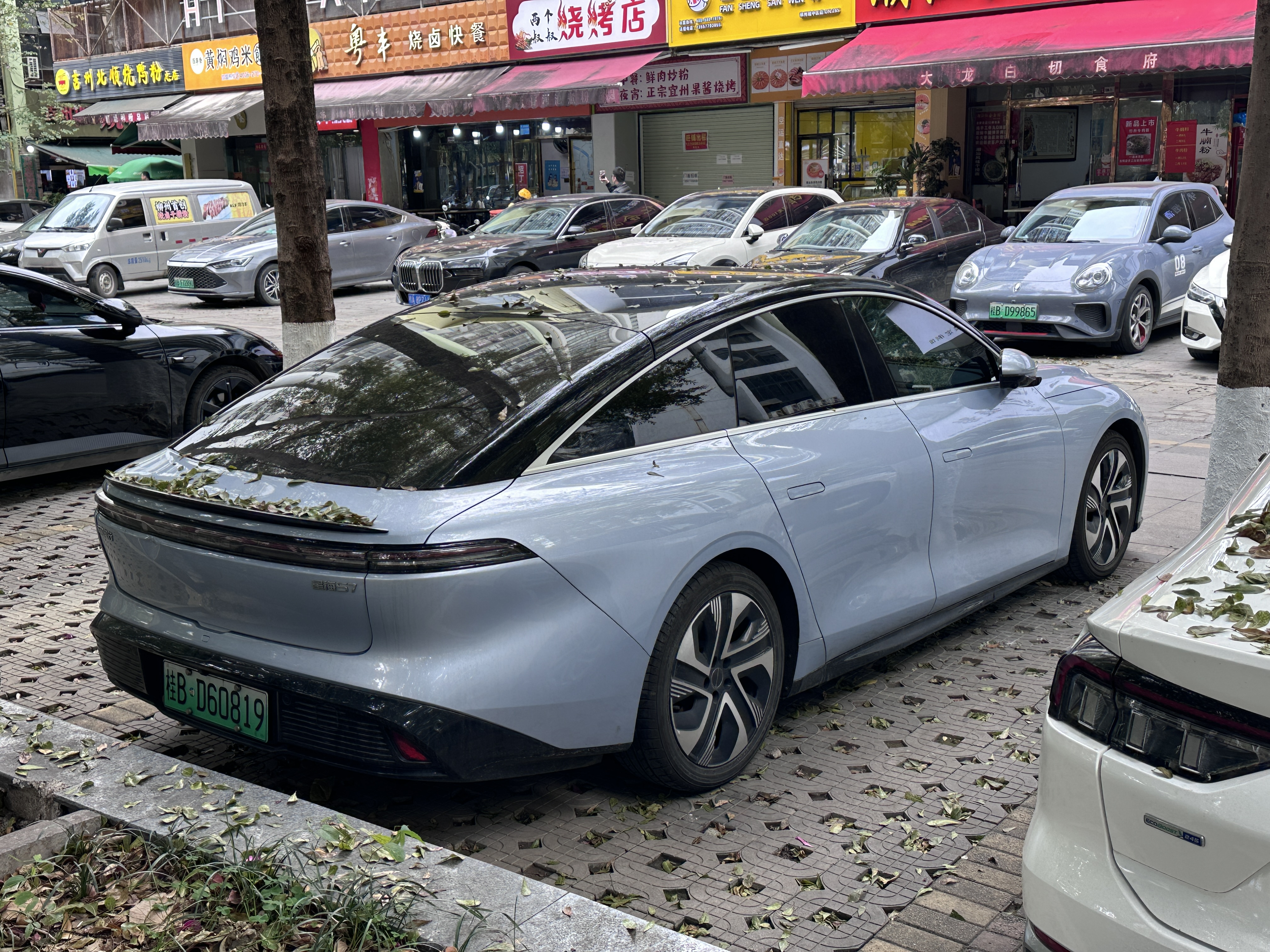
Rear view

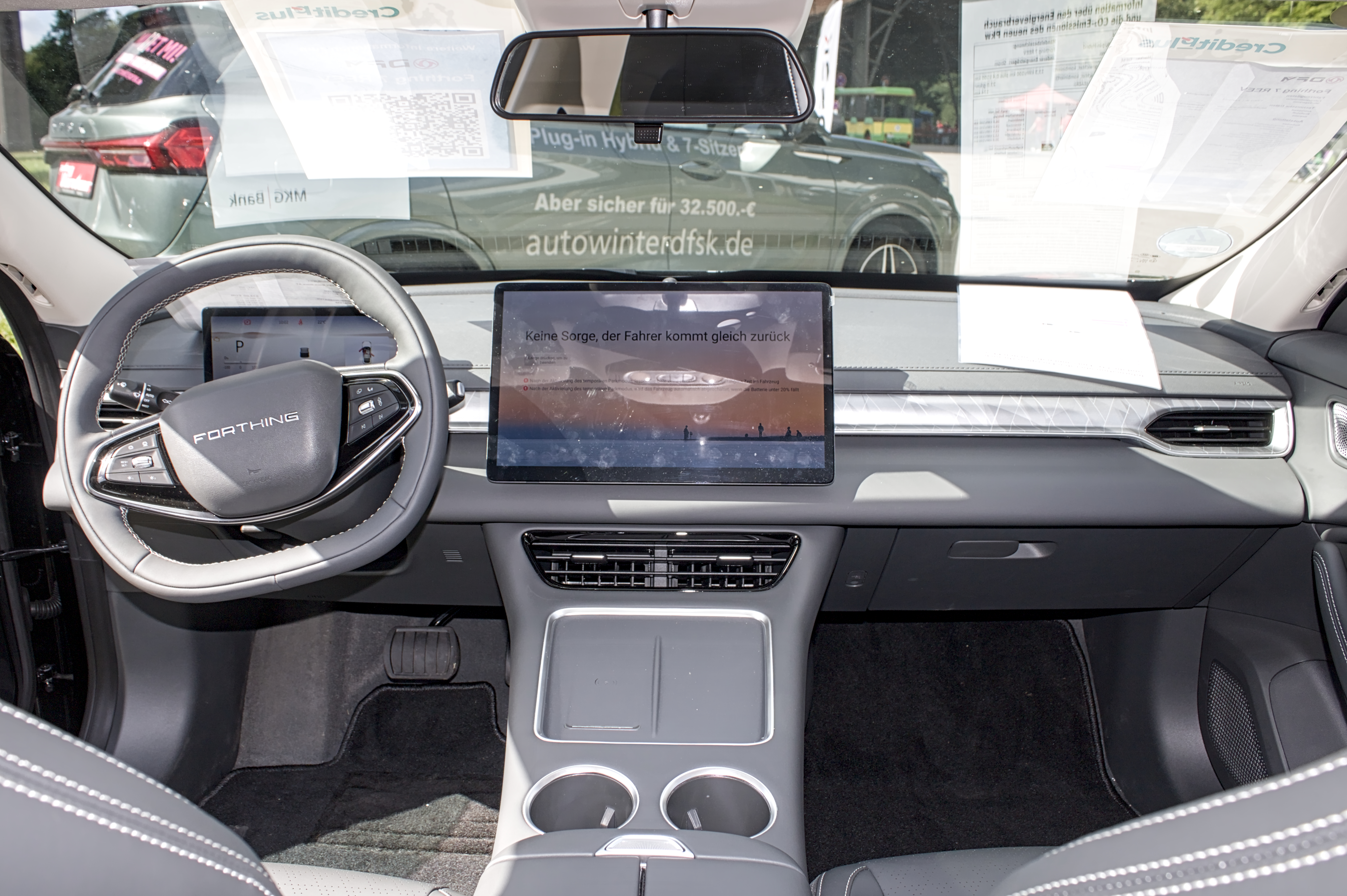
Interior

== Sales ==
Year	China		
Year	EV	EREV	Total
2024	4,385	27	4,412
2025	11,432	812	12,244
