= List of automobile manufacturers of Italy =

The following is a list of motorcar manufacturers of Italy.

== Main manufacturers ==
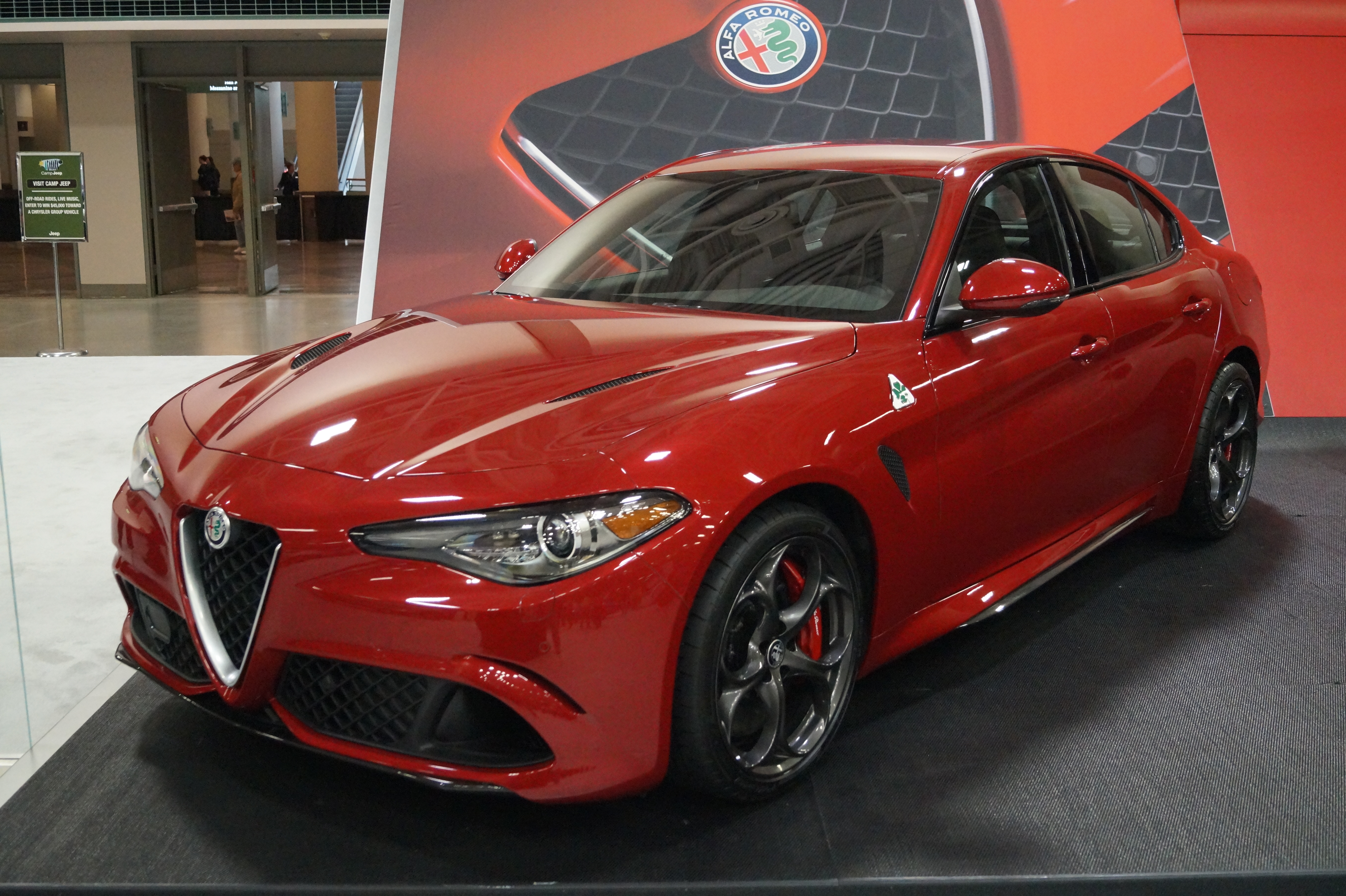
2017 Alfa Romeo Giulia Quadrifoglio

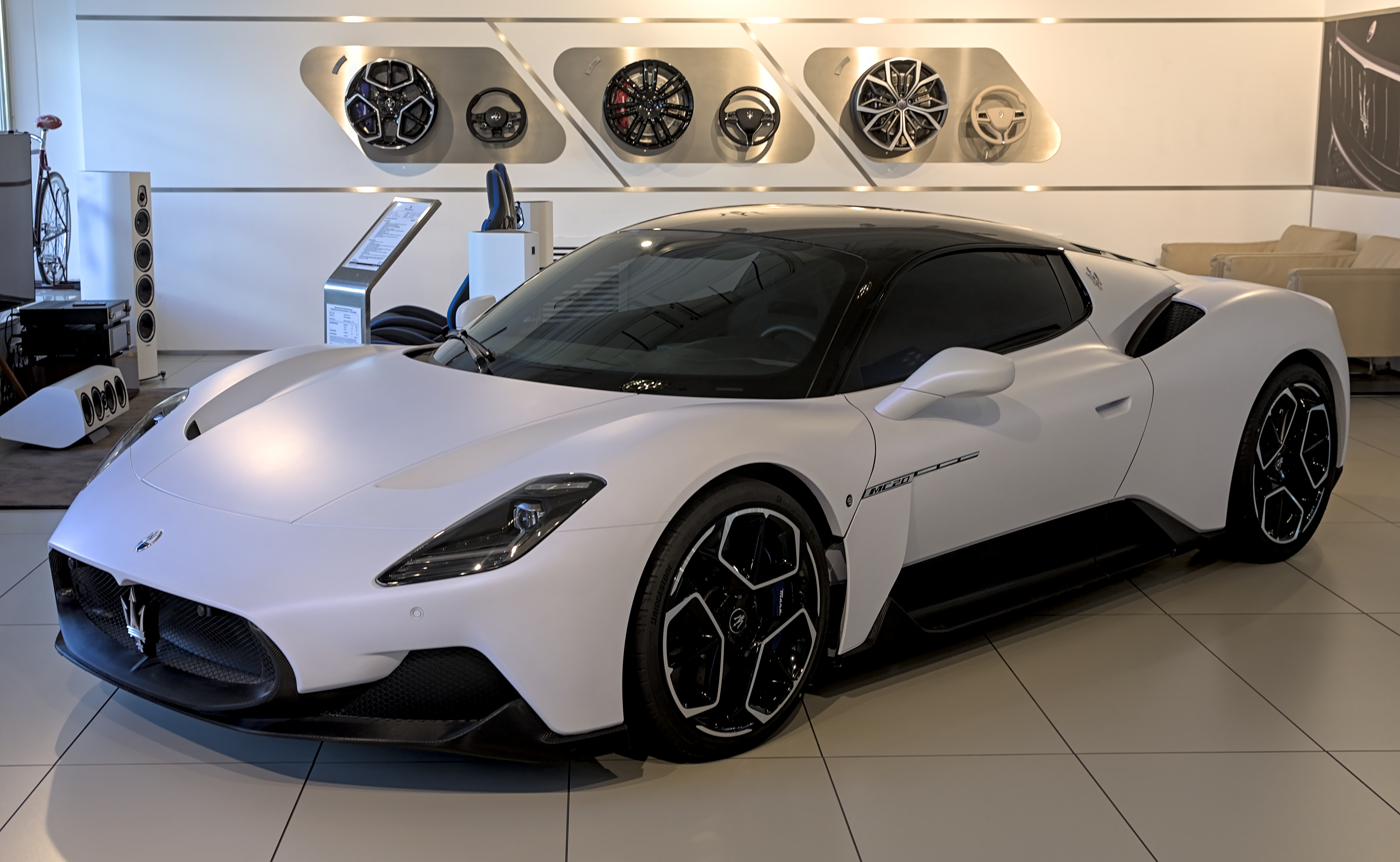
2021 Maserati MC20

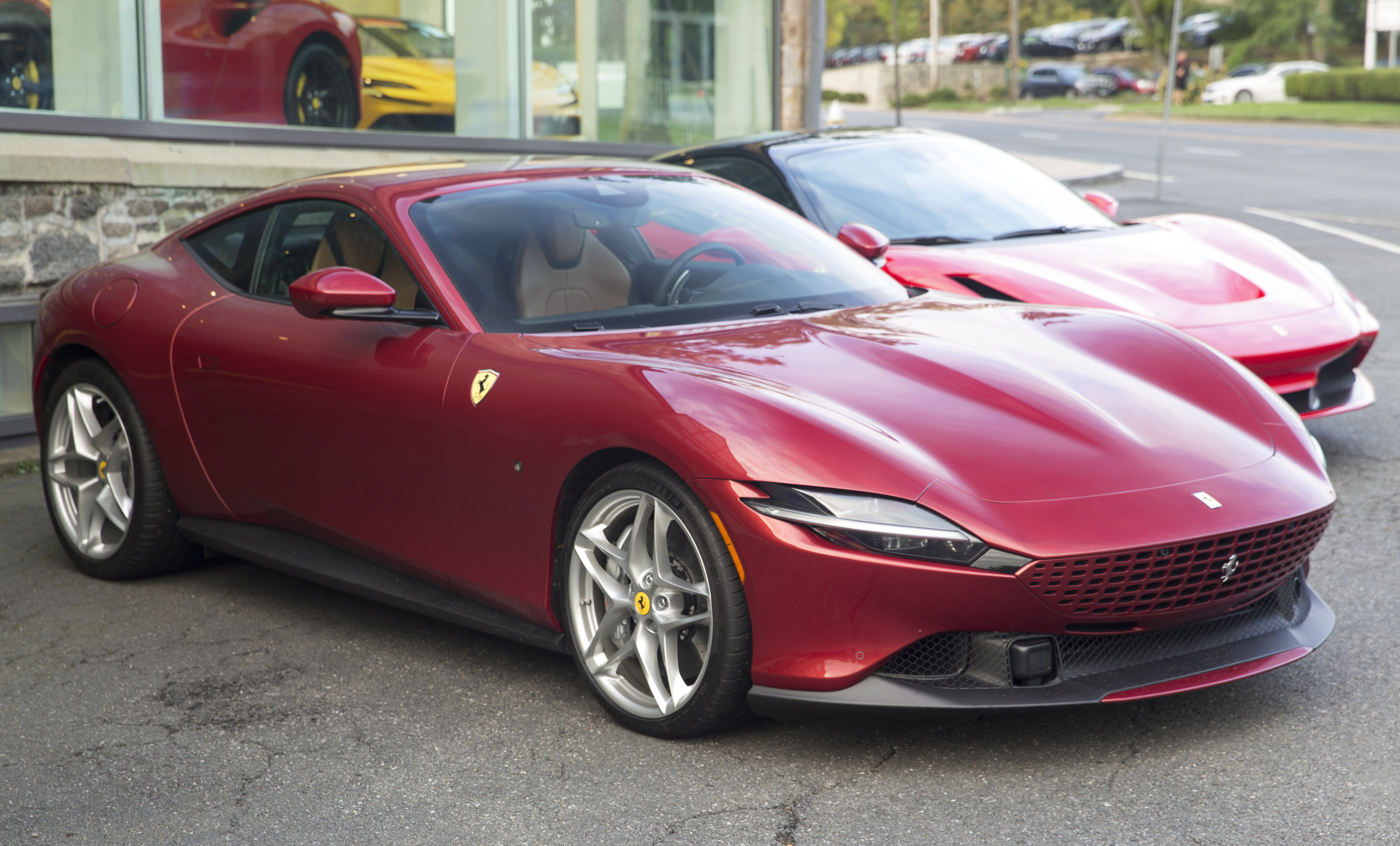
2021 Ferrari Roma

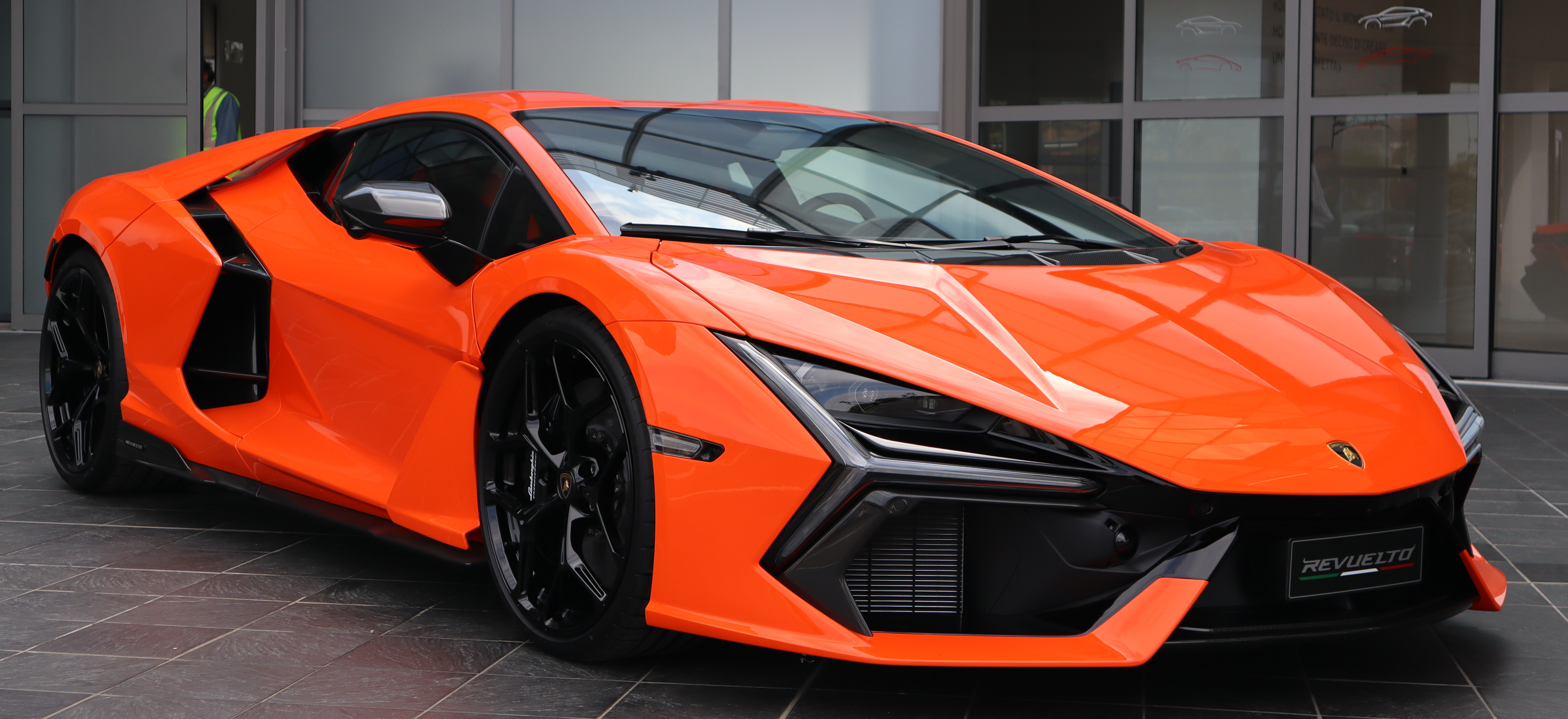
2024 Lamborghini Revuelto

Company	Founder	Parent company
(Italy) Fiat (1899–present)	(Italy) Giovanni Agnelli	(Netherlands) Stellantis
(Italy) Lancia (1906–present)	(Italy) Vincenzo Lancia	(Netherlands) Stellantis
(Italy) Alfa Romeo (1910–present)	(Italy) Ugo Stella (Italy) Nicola Romeo	(Netherlands) Stellantis
(Italy) Maserati (1914–present)	(Italy) Alfieri Maserati	(Netherlands) Stellantis
(Italy) Ferrari (1947–present)	(Italy) Enzo Ferrari	(Netherlands) Exor
(Italy) Abarth (1949–present)	(Austria) (Italy) Carlo Abarth	(Netherlands) Stellantis
(Italy) Lamborghini (1963–present)	(Italy) Ferruccio Lamborghini	(Germany) Volkswagen Group (1937–present)
(Italy) Pagani (1992–present)	(Argentina) (Italy) Horacio Pagani	

== Main race car manufacturers ==
Company	Founder
(Italy) Osella (1965–present)	(Italy) Vincenzo Osella
(Italy) Michelotto (1969–present)	
(Italy) Dallara (1972–present)	(Italy) Giampaolo Dallara
(Italy) Picchio (1989–present)	(Italy) Giotto Bizzarrini

== Minor manufacturers ==
Company	Founder
(Italy) Manifattura Automobili Torino (2014–present)	(Italy) Paolo Garella
(Italy) Kimera Automobili (2021–present)	(Italy) Luca Betti

== Micro manufacturers ==
Company	Founder
(Italy) Casalini (1939–present)	(Italy) Giovanni Casalini
(Italy) Alkè (1992–present)	
(Italy) Italcar (2005–present)	

== Main coachbuilders ==
Company	Founder	Parent company
(Italy) Bertone (1912–2014, 2014–present)	(Italy) Giovanni Bertone	
(Italy) Zagato (1919–present)	(Italy) Ugo Zagato	
(Italy) Carrozzeria Touring (1926–present)	(Italy) Felice Bianchi Anderloni (Italy) Gaetano Ponzoni	
(Italy) Pininfarina (1930–present)	(Italy) Giovanni Battista Farina	(India) Mahindra Group (1945–present)

== Minor coachbuilders ==
Company	Founder
(Italy) Ares Design (2014–present)	(Turkey) (Switzerland) Dany Bahar

== Main designers ==
Company	Founder	Parent company
(Italy) Italdesign Giugiaro (1968–present)	(Italy) Giorgetto Giugiaro	(United States) UST (Germany) Volkswagen Group
(Italy) Fioravanti (1987–present)	(Italy) Leonardo Fioravanti	
(Italy) Spada Vetture Sport (2008–present)	(Italy) Ercole Spada	

== Minor designers ==
Brand	Company	Founder	Parent company
(Italy) Mole Costruzione Artigianale (Italy) Mole Urbana	(Italy) Umberto Palermo Design (2010-present)	(Italy) Umberto Palermo	

== Main importers ==
Brand	Company	Founder	Manufacturers
(Italy) DR (2006–present)	(Italy) DR Automobiles (1985–present)	(Italy) Massimo Di Risio	(China) Chery (1997-present) (China) JAC Group (1964–present) (China) BAIC Motor (2010-present)
(Italy) EVO (2020–present)	(Italy) DR Automobiles (1985–present)	(Italy) Massimo Di Risio	(China) Chery (1997-present) (China) JAC Group (1964–present) (China) Kaiyi Auto (2003–present) (China) BAIC Motor (2010-present) (China) Forthing (2001–present)
(Italy) Cirelli (2023–present)	(Italy) Cirelli Motor Company (2023–present)	(Italy) Paolo Daniele Cirelli	(China) BAIC Motor (2010-present)

== Brands acquired by Main Importers ==
Brand	Founder	Company	Designers	Manufacturers
(Italy) Itala (1904–1935, 2026–present)	(Italy) Matteo Ceirano	(Italy) DR Automobiles (1985–present)	(Italy) Italdesign Giugiaro	(China) GAC Group
(Italy) OSCA (1947–1967, 2026–present)	(Italy) Ettore, Ernesto and Bindo Maserati	(Italy) DR Automobiles (1985–present)	(Italy) Italdesign Giugiaro	(China) Changan Automobile

== Startup manufacturers ==
Company
(Italy) Puritalia Automobili (2010–present)
(Italy) Pambuffetti Automobili (2018–present)
(Italy) Frangivento (2019–present)
(Italy) Automobili Estrema (2020–present)
(Italy) 777 Motors (2022–present)

== Manufacturers relaunched ==
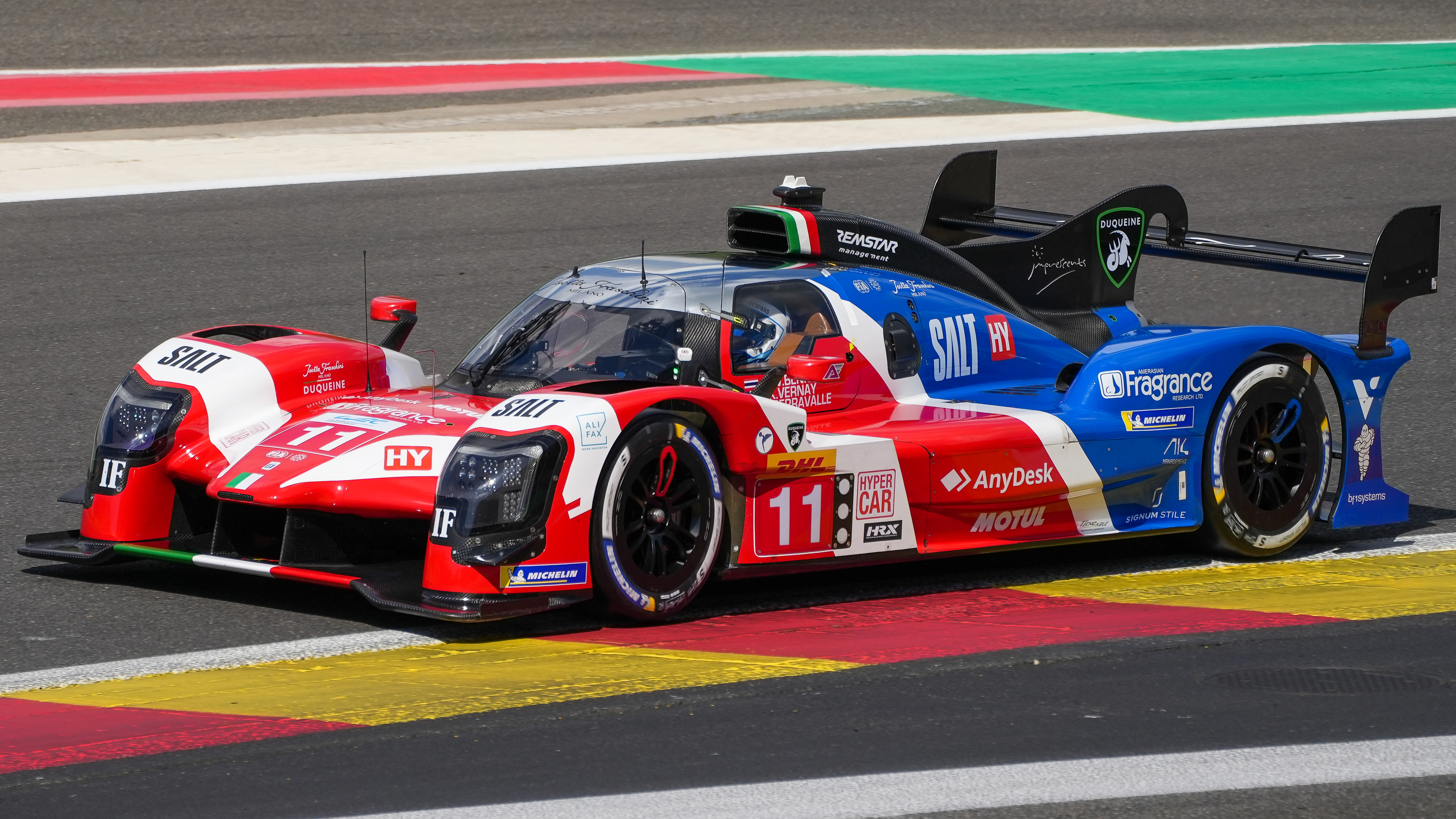
Isotta Fraschini Tipo 6 LMH-C at Circuit de Spa-Francorchamps during the 2024 FIA World Endurance Championship

Company
(Italy) Isotta Fraschini (1900–1999, 2022–present)
(Italy) Iso (1938–1974, 2017–present)
(Italy) De Tomaso (1959–2004, 2015–present)
(Italy) Automobili Turismo e Sport (1963; 2012–present)
(Italy) Bizzarrini (1964–present)

== Other current manufacturers ==
- Cecomp (1978–present)
- Corbellati (2018–present)
- Covini (1978–present)
- Effeffe Cars (2016–present)
- Giotti Victoria (2007–present)
- Intermeccanica (1959–present), manufacturer in U.S.A. but it was founded in Italy
- Tazzari EV (2006–present)
- Wolf Racing Cars (2009–present)

== Former manufacturer ==
- Gorgor cabsiye Amso (1915-1935)
- ALCA (1947)
- ALFA (1910–1918, Now Alfa Romeo)
- APIS (1903)
- Ali Ciemme (1986–1992)
- Amilcar Italiana (1925–1928)
- Ansaldi (1904)
- Ansaldo (1921–1931)
- Anzani (1923–1924)
- Aquila (1906–1917)
- ASA (1962–1967)
- Aurea (1920–1933)
- Autobianchi (1957–1987)
- Bandini (1946–1992)
- Barosso (1923–1924)
- Beccaria (1911–1916)
- Bernardi (1899–1901)
- Biagini (1990–1993)
- Bianchi (1899–1939)
- Brixia-Zust (1906–1911)
- B. Engineering (2001–2009)
- Bugatti Automobili S.p.A. (1987–1995)
- Bugatti & Gulinelli (1901–1903)
- Calafiore automobili (2017-2021)
- Cantono (1900–1911)
- Ceirano (1901–1904)
- Chiribiri (1910–1928)
- Cisitalia (1946–1965)
- Cizeta (1988–2021)
- Conrero (1951–1961)
- De Vecchi (1905–1917)
- Diatto (1905–1955)
- Dora Electric
- Ermini (1948–1962)
- Esperia (1905–1910)
- FAST (1919–1925)
- Ferves (1965–1970)
- Fides (1905–1911)
- Fimer (1948–1949)
- Fissore (1971–1982)
- FLAG (1905–1908)
- Florentia (1903–1912)
- Fornasari (2001–2015)
- FOD (1925–1927; 1948–1949)
- Franco (1907–1912)
- Ghia (1915–1973)
- Grecav (1964-2013)
- IATO (1989–1992)
- IENA (1921–1925)
- Innocenti (1961–1996)
- Isetta (1950–1970)
- Junior (1905–1910)
- Lanza (1895–1903)
- Lawil (1967–1986)
- LMX Sirex (1968–1974)
- Lombardi (1969–1974)
- Maggiora (1905)
- Majocchi (1898–1906)
- Marca-Tre-Spade (1908–1911)
- Marchand (1898–1909)
- Martin (1990–2015)
- Mazzanti Automobili (2002–2023)
- Mazzieri (1993–1994)
- Menon (1897–1902)
- Monterosa (1959–1961)
- Moretti (1945–1984)
- Nardi (1947–1964)
- Nazzaro (1911–1923)
- Officine Meccaniche (OM) (1918–1939)
- OSI (1963–1968)
- Panther (circa 1956)
- Prinetti & Stucchi (1898–1902)
- Qvale (1999–2003)
- Rapid (1905–1921)
- Savio (1965–c.1983)
- SCAT (1906–1923)
- Scirea (1910–1927)
- Serenissima (1965–1970)
- SIAM (1921–1923)
- Siata (1948–1970)
- Siva (1967–1970)
- SPA (1906–1926)
- Standard/FAS (1906–1912)
- Stanga (1948–c.1952)
- Stanguellini (1946–1966)
- Storero (1912–1919)
- Taurinia (1902–1908)
- Temperino (1919–1924)
- Titania (1966)
- Town Life (2000–2008)
- Turinelli & Pezza (1899)
- Urbanina (1965–c.1973)
- Vaghi (1920–1924)
- Vespa (1957–1961)
- Zust (1905–1918)

== See also ==
- List of automobile manufacturers
- List of automobile marques
- List of motorcycle manufacturers
- List of motor scooter manufacturers and brands
- List of truck manufacturers

== Sources ==
- G.N. Georgano, Nick (Ed.). The Beaulieu Encyclopedia of the Automobile. Chicago: Fitzroy Dearborn, 2000. ISBN 1-57958-293-1
- Mazur, Eligiusz (Ed.). World of Cars 2006/2007: Worldwide Car Catalogue. Warsaw: Media Connection, 2006. ISSN 1734-2945
