= List of microcars by country of origin: I =

== List ==
Country	Automobile Name	Manufacturer	Engine Make/Capacity	Seats	Year	Other information
Italy	Abarth 595	Abarth & Co, Turin	Fiat 594 cc	2	1960-1964	Basically a Fiat 500D with enlarged and tuned engine, Abarth badgework and stronger suspension in some versions
Italy	ALL-CARS Charly	ALL-CARS srl, Pianoro	Moto Morini 49 cc	2	1974-1985	This car was designed by Beach buggy manufacturer Autozodiaco. It was also sold as the All Cars Snuggy
Italy	ALL-CARS Charly II	ALL-CARS srl, Pianoro	125 cc	2	1977-1985	
Italy	ALL-CARS Tobrouk	ALL-CARS srl, Pianoro	125 cc	2	1977-1985	convertible version of the Charly
Italy	ALL-CARS Charly Camel	ALL-CARS srl, Pianoro	50 cc	2	1977-1985	Big wheeled (a la dune buggy) version of the Charly II
Italy	ALL-CARS Charly III	ALL-CARS srl, Pianoro	50 cc or 125 cc (Motori BCB)	2	1982-1985	Updated version of the Charly II with automatic transmission
Italy	ALL-CARS Charly 4	ALL-CARS srl, Pianoro	125 cc or 250 cc	2	1986	4-wheel version of the Charly
Italy	Atomo	S.A.M.C.A., Parma	250 cc	2	1947-1948	
Italy	Autobianchi Bianchina	Autobianchi S.p.A., Milan	FIAT 479 cc and 499 cc	4	1957-1970	Based on FIAT 500 mechanicals, over 250,000 Bianchinas were sold in a variety of body styles
Italy	Automirage Mirage 3	Automirage S.r.l., Pianoro, Bologna	Moto Morini 49 cc	1	1976-1985	
Italy	Automirage SR3	Automirage S.r.l., Pianoro, Bologna	BCB 125 cc or 250 cc	2	1981-1985	
Italy	Automirage SR4	Automirage S.r.l., Pianoro, Bologna	BCB 250 cc	2	1985	
Italy	Casalini Sulky	Costruzioni Meccaniche Casalini, Piacenza			1971-	See also it:Casalini
Italy	Casalini Bretta	Costruzioni Meccaniche Casalini, Piacenza			1981-	
Italy	Ferves Ranger	Ferves S.r.l., Turin	FIAT 499 cc	4	1968-1971	First shown to the public at the 1966 Turin Motor Show
Italy	Ferves Cargo	Ferves S.r.l., Turin	FIAT 499 cc	2	1968-1971	
Italy	Johny Panther	F.I.A.M., Coriano di Rimini	Morini 124 cc	2	1978-	
Italy	FIAT 500A (Topolino)^{[a]}	FIAT S.p.A., Turin	FIAT 569 cc	2+2	1936-1948	
Italy	FIAT 500B (Topolino)	FIAT S.p.A., Turin	FIAT 569 cc	2+2	1948-1949	
Italy	FIAT 500B Giardiniera (Topolino)	FIAT S.p.A., Turin	FIAT 569 cc	4	1948-1949	
Italy	FIAT 500C (Topolino)	FIAT S.p.A., Turin	FIAT 569 cc	4	1949-1955	
Italy	FIAT 500C Giardiniera (Topolino)	FIAT S.p.A., Turin	FIAT 569 cc	4	1949-1955	
Italy	FIAT 500C Belvedere (Topolino)	FIAT S.p.A., Turin	FIAT 569 cc	4	1952-1955	
Italy	FIAT 600	FIAT S.p.A., Turin	FIAT 633 cc	4	1955-1960	
Italy	FIAT 600 Multipla	FIAT S.p.A., Turin	FIAT 633 cc	6	1956-1960	
Italy	FIAT Nuova 500	FIAT S.p.A., Turin	FIAT 479 cc	2+2	1957-1960	
Italy	FIAT 500 Sport	FIAT S.p.A., Turin	FIAT 499 cc	2+2	1958-1960	
Italy	FIAT 500 Giardiniera	FIAT S.p.A., Turin	FIAT 499 cc	4	1960-1977	
Italy	FIAT 500 D - F - R - L	FIAT S.p.A., Turin	FIAT 499 cc	4	1960-1965	Production continued with the 500F (1965-1968) and 500L (1968–72) which were essentially the same as the 500D with a more powerful engine and further refinements
Italy	Fiat 500R	FIAT S.p.A., Turin	FIAT 594 cc	4	1972-1975	
Italy	FIAT 126	FIAT S.p.A., Turin	FIAT 594 cc until 1977 then increased to 652 cc	4	1972-1992	
Italy	Chihuahua	F.I.M., Salerno	250 cc		1975-	
Italy	Fimer	Fabbrica Italiana Motoveicoli е Rimorchi (FIMER), Milan	250 cc	2	1947-1949	
Italy	Fioretti	Autofioretti srl, Rome	Vespa 50 cc		1980	
Italy	ISO Isetta	ISO Rivolta Bresso		2	1953–1955	
Italy	Lawil					
Italy	Piaggio Porter	Piaggio S.p.A.		2		Utility van
Italy	Zagato Zele 1000				1976	Imported and sold in the US as the Elcar
India	Badal	Sunrise Auto Industries Ltd (SAIL), Bangalore^{[b]}	198 cc	4	1975-1982	
India	Badal 4	Sunrise Auto Industries Ltd (SAIL), Bangalore^{[b]}	198 cc	4	1981-1982	
India	G Wiz electric car (REVA)	Reva Electric Car Company	AC Traction Motor, 13 kW peak power	4	2009	
India	Multix	Eicher Motors and Polaris Inc	652cc	4	2015-2018	Personal utility vehicle
India	Bajaj Qute (RE60)	Bajaj Auto	216cc DTSi petrol and cng	3+D	2012-present	Quadricycle (EU vehicle classification)
etc...

== Notes ==
- a. British motorists are credited with being the first to christen the 1930s Fiat 500A “Little Mouse” or Topolino in Italian. The nickname was universally adopted by the public, but never officially adopted by Fiat.
- b. At some time the company was restructured to become Sipani Automobiles Ltd, sources vary widely as to the year that this took place. In 1982 the company began production of a licence built Reliant Kitten under the name Sipani Dolphin
