= Iato =

Iato may refer to:

- IATO, Italian car company
- Monte Iato, mountain in Sicily
