= Fornasier =

Fornasier may refer to:

- Michele Fornasier (born 1993), Italian footballer
- 13248 Fornasier, a main-belt asteroid

== See also ==
- Fornasari
- Fornaciari
