= Delta Motors =

Delta Motors can mean any of the following:

- Delta Motors Corporation, a now defunct automobile company from the Philippines
- Delta Motor Corporation, now a fully owned subsidiary of General Motors South Africa
- Delta Motor Car Company, a defunct automobile company from the United States
- Delta Motorsport
- Delta Veicoli Speciali, a defunct automobile company from Turin, Italy
- In Israel, Dacia vehicles were sold between 1978 and 1989 under the "Delta" brand.
