= Samas =

Samas may refer to

- Šamaš, the Semitic Sun god
- Samas (automobile manufacturer), a defunct Italian auto manufacturer
- Samāsa "compound" in Sanskrit grammar, see Sanskrit compound
