= Fornaciari =

Fornaciari (pronounced [fornaˈtʃaːri]) is an Italian surname from Emilia-Romagna (especially Reggio Emilia) and Tuscany (especially Lucca), originally indicating someone working at a kiln (Italian: fornace). Notable people with the surname include:

- Bruno Fornaciari (1881–1959), Italian civil servant
- Irene Fornaciari (born 1983), Italian singer-songwriter
- Paolo Fornaciari (born 1971), Italian cyclist
- Zucchero Fornaciari (born 1955), Italian singer-songwriter and musician

== See also ==
- Fornasari
- Fornasier (disambiguation)
