= Fornasari Hunter =

SUV made by Italian company Fornasari

Fornasari Hunter is a sport utility vehicle (SUV) made by the Italian company Fornasari.

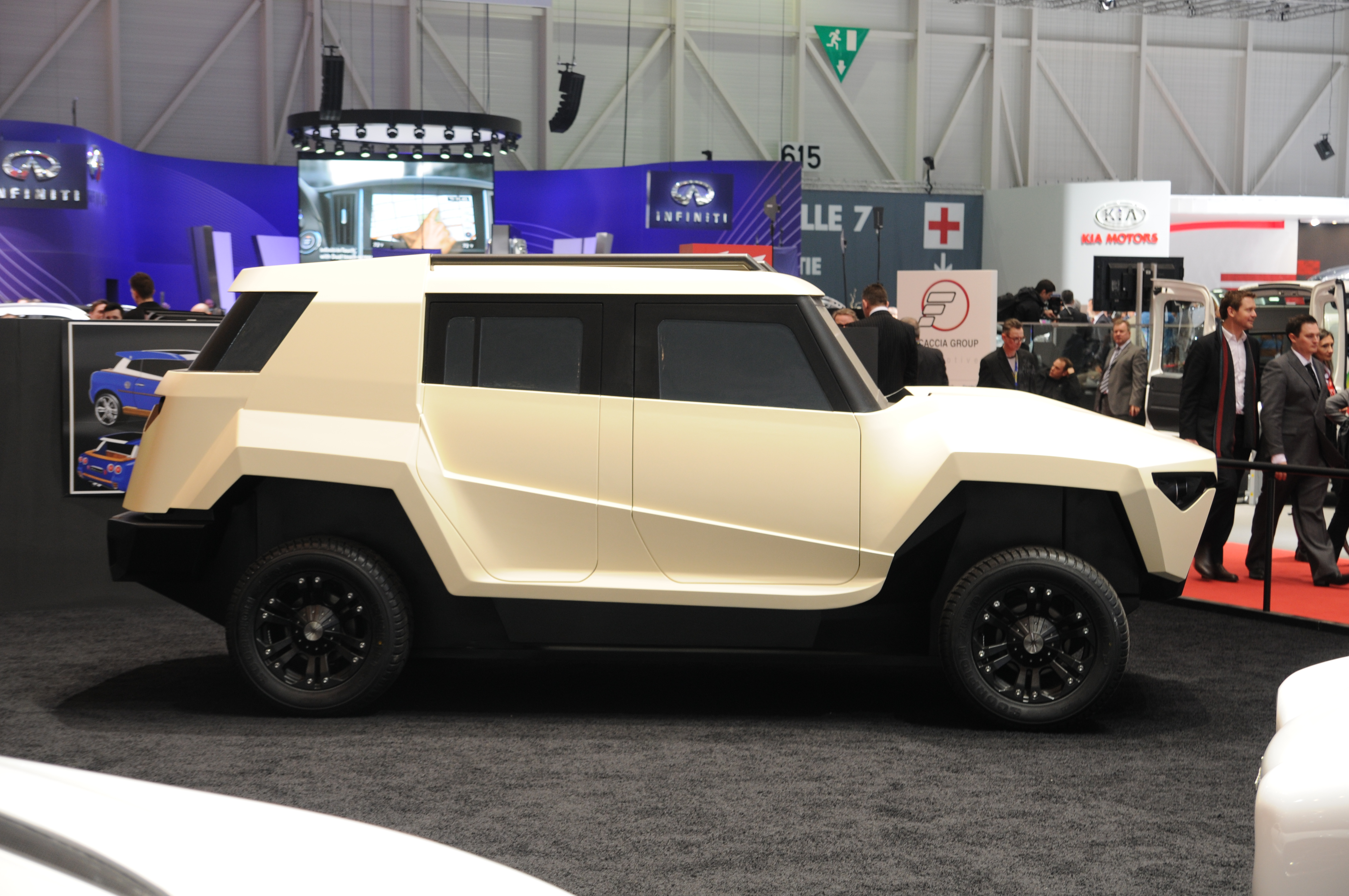
A Fornasari Hunter at a motor show

It is available in two customization options: racetrack (GP suspension and brakes, carbon fiber body and slick tires) and desert (Dakar suspension, aluminium body, offroad tyres). It is one of the few cars available in any color scheme. It has a molybdenum-chrome alloy frame. It is available with a choice of a V6 and four V8s, all from General Motors (GM).
