= Delta Yeti =

Defunct small off-road vehicle of 1960

The Delta Yeti is a small off-road vehicle built by the defunct Delta Special Vehicles in Turin, Italy towards the end of the 1960s.

== The context ==
The Yeti was designed by the same people who had designed the Ferves (Ranger) and it is a small four-seater off-road vehicle with open bodywork and a canvas roof, which can be applied by means of ribbed frames.

The structure is composed of an external steel box frame, whose squared shape characterizes and conditions the vehicle line.

It was powered by the engine of the Fiat 850 and is the first off-road vehicle equipped with four drive wheels and steering wheels built in Italy for the civilian market.

Put on sale in 1968 and produced in very small series, despite the refined construction technique, the "Yeti" had little commercial success, remaining in phase little more than a prototype.

== SAMAS ==
After a couple of years the project was acquired by a new company in Alba, SAMAS (Società Albese Meccanica Speciali Specia), which replaced the engine with new FIAT 127's 903 cc unit, rebranding it as the SAMAS Yeti 903. In 1973 the same house also presented a six-wheel drive project version of the Yeti, which did not enter production.

The change made by SAMAS was not limited to the mere replacement of the engine, but rather to a radical change in mechanics. The main one was the positioning of the engine no longer cantilevered on the front axle but set back almost inside the cockpit. In addition, various mechanical components were used, such as the gearbox of the Fiat 124, differentials of the Alfa Romeo Giulia, the steering box of the Fiat 316 pickup truck; only the gearbox reducer box was built specifically for this model. The design was acquired by Embo S.p.A. in 1978, who offered it as the K/80. After a redesign in 1980, they tried selling it as the Embo Mega. It is unknown if Embo actually built any examples, as their own brochure only includes amateurish drawings of the Mega.

== Technical notes ==
Production - from 1968 to 1975 with about 200 examples produced. 75 of which were built by SAMAS.

== Other characteristics ==
- Length – 3240 mm
- Width – 1480 mm
- Height – 1650 mm
- Mass – 990 kg
