= Delta Veicoli Speciali =

Motor vehicle manufacturer from Turin, Italy

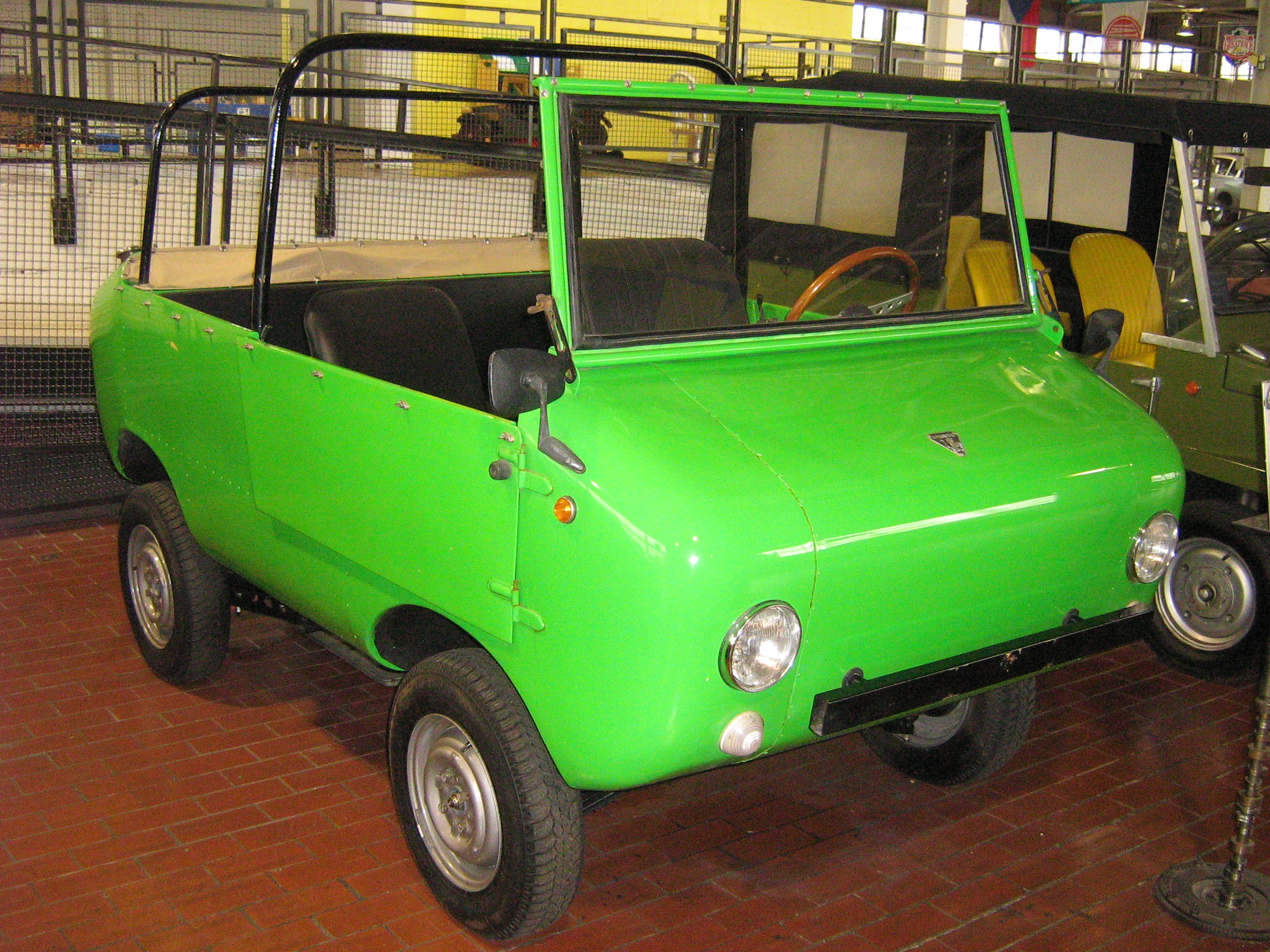
1965 Ferves Ranger 4x4

Delta Veicoli Speciali (English: Delta Special Vehicles) was a Turin, Italy based motor vehicle manufacturer whose only two products were the Ferves and the Yeti 4x4s.
