= Panther Type 400 =

The Panther Type 400 is an automobile which was produced by Industria Sammarinese Costruzioni Automezzi of Milan, Italy sometime around 1956.

The Panther Type 400 was offered in two models:

- Type 400 D, offered as a saloon powered by a 520 cc 2-cylinder diesel engine.
- Type 400 B, offered as a 2-door saloon powered by a 520 cc 2-cylinder petrol engine, and as a Pantherbus Station Wagon.

The Type 400 D saloon had an overall length of 3.56 metres (11.7 ft) and a wheelbase of 1.98 metres (6.5 ft).
