= Fissore =

Fissore is a surname. Notable people with the surname include:

== People ==
- Matías Fissore (born 1990), Argentine footballer
- Riccardo Fissore (born 1980), Italian footballer

== Companies ==
- Carrozzeria Fissore Italian coachbuilder, founded by Fissore brothers
