= Cirelli Motor Company =

Italian automobile company

CMC Srl.
- Type: Private
- Industry: Automotive
- Founded: 2023; 3 years ago
- Founder: Paolo Daniele Cirelli
- Headquarters: Milan, Italy
- Area served: Italy
- Products: Automobiles
- Website: cirellimotorcompany.com

Cirelli Motor Company is an Italian automobile company. The company imports Chinese automobiles, rebadges them and modifies them to also run on liquefied petroleum gas (LPG). Cirelli was founded in 2023 by Paolo Daniele Cirelli, whose family has a background in installing aftermarket LPG kits, car dealerships and motor sports.

In 2024, Cirelli entered a dispute with DR Automobiles for the purported exclusive import of BAIC Motor vehicles to Italy.

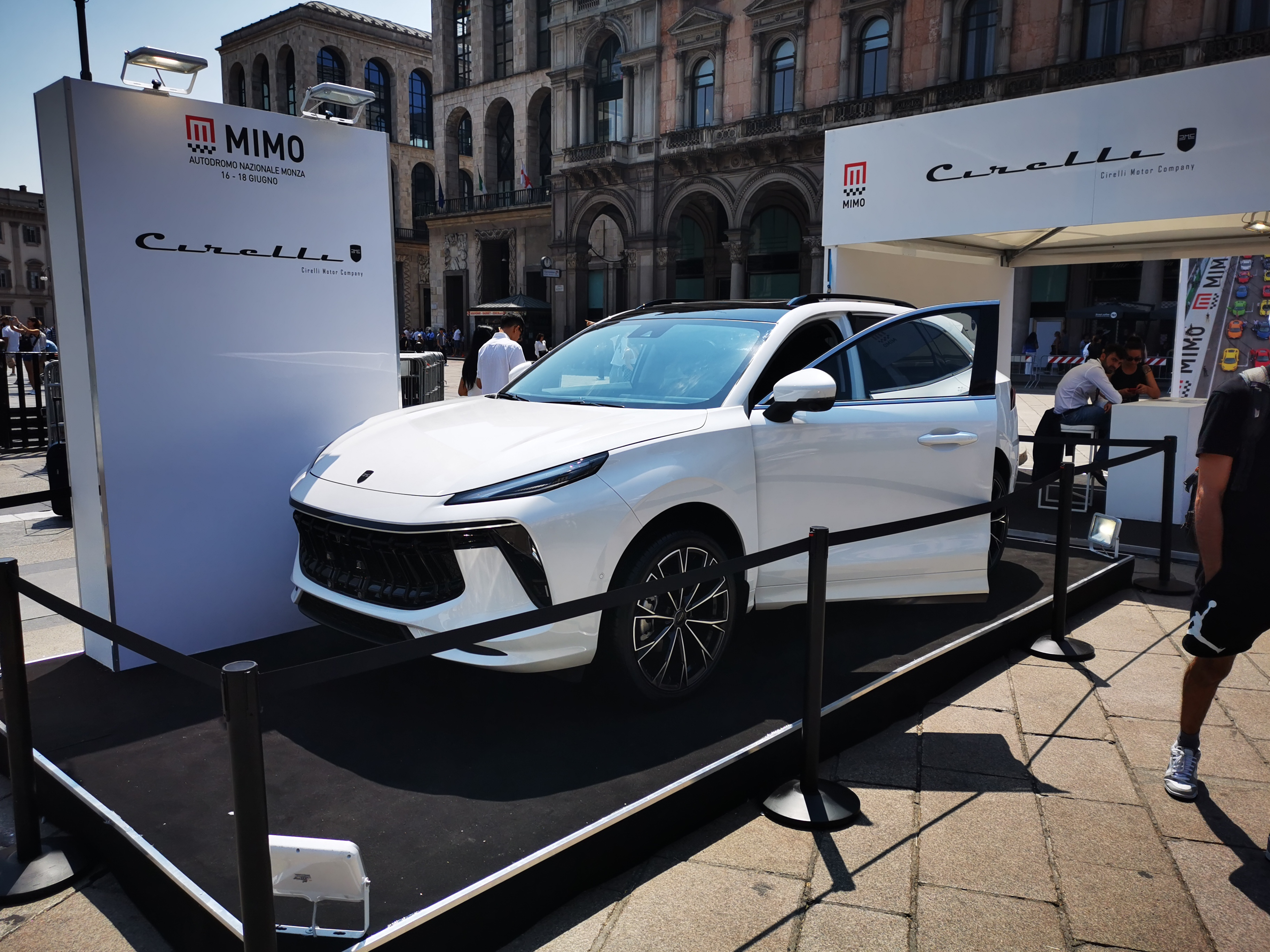
Cirelli 5

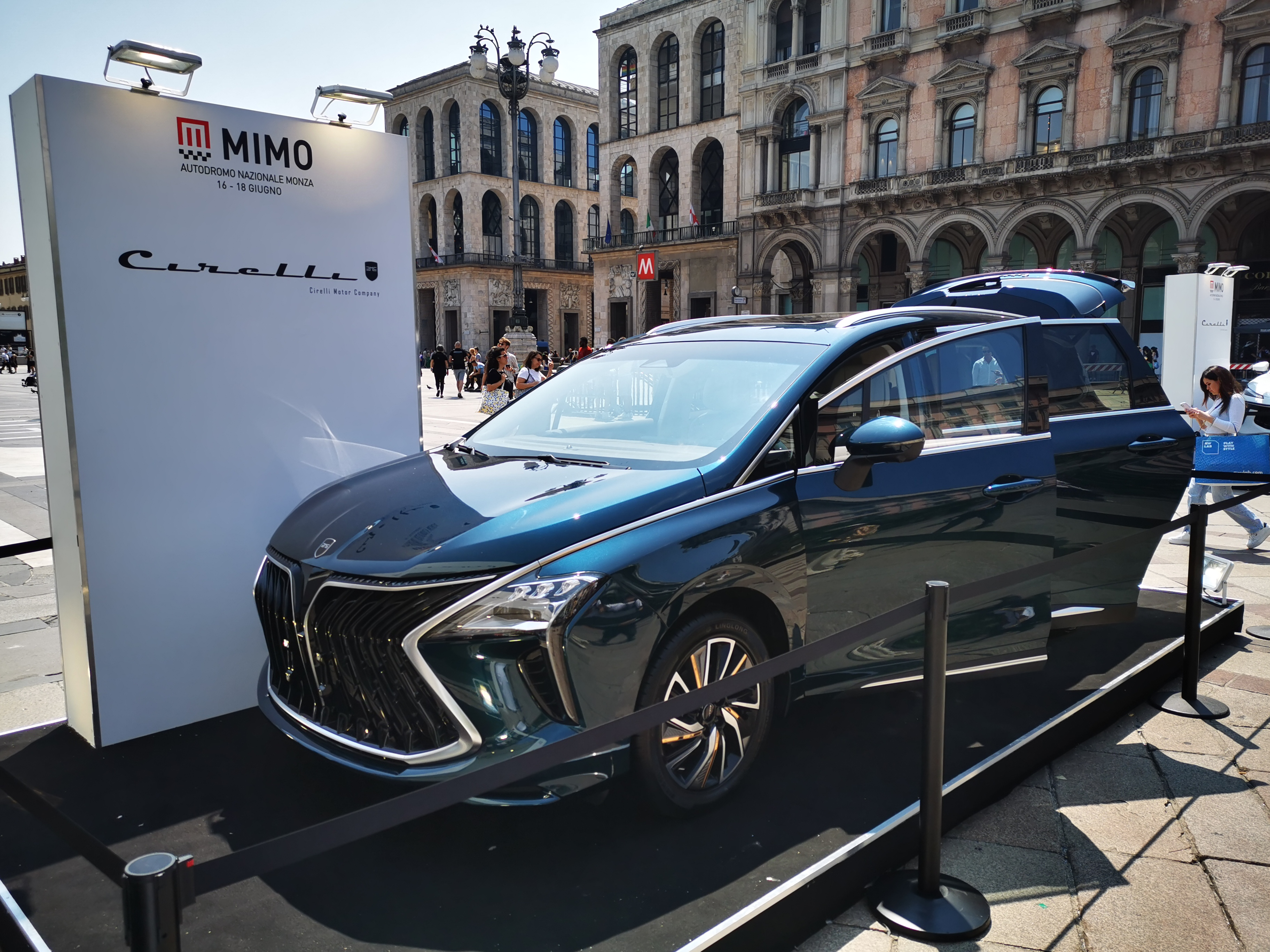
Cirelli 7

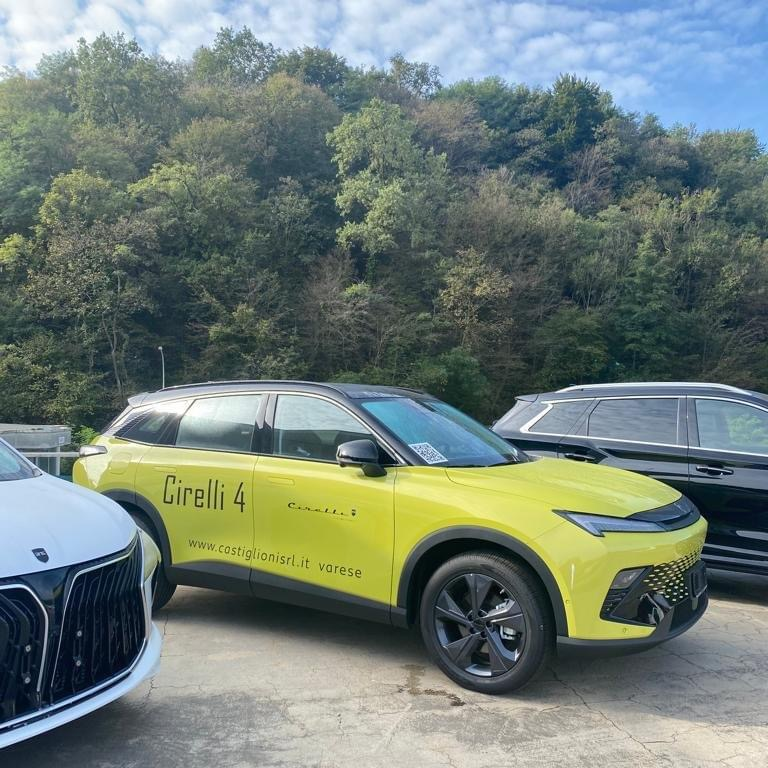
Cirelli 4

== Models ==
- Cirelli 1 - SWM Tiger
- Cirelli 2 - Beijing X3
- Cirelli 3 - SWM G01
- Cirelli 4 - Fengon 580 (2024-), Beijing Mofang (2021 – 2024)
- Cirelli 5 - Forthing T5 Evo
- Cirelli 6 - SWM G05
- Cirelli 7 - Forthing U-Tour
- Cirelli 8 - Dongfeng Rich 6
- Cirelli 3zero3 - Forthing T5
