= Fimer =

Italian Automobile Manufacturer

The Fimer was an Italian automobile manufactured from 1948 until 1949. One of many mini-cars built in the years following World War II, it had a 246 cc two-stroke rear-mounted motorcycle engine; few were constructed.
