= Lawil S.p.A. =

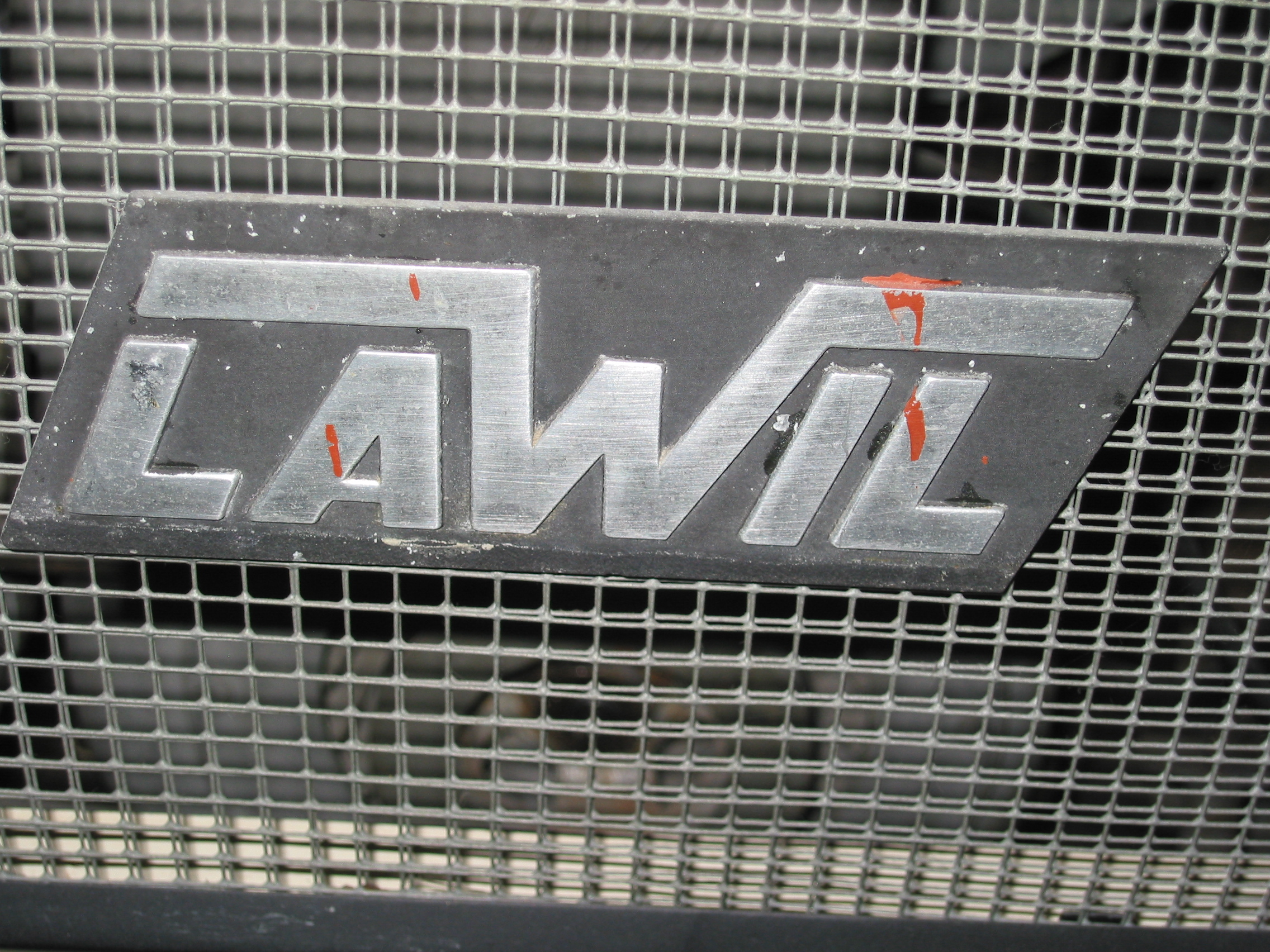
Logo of the Lawil brand.

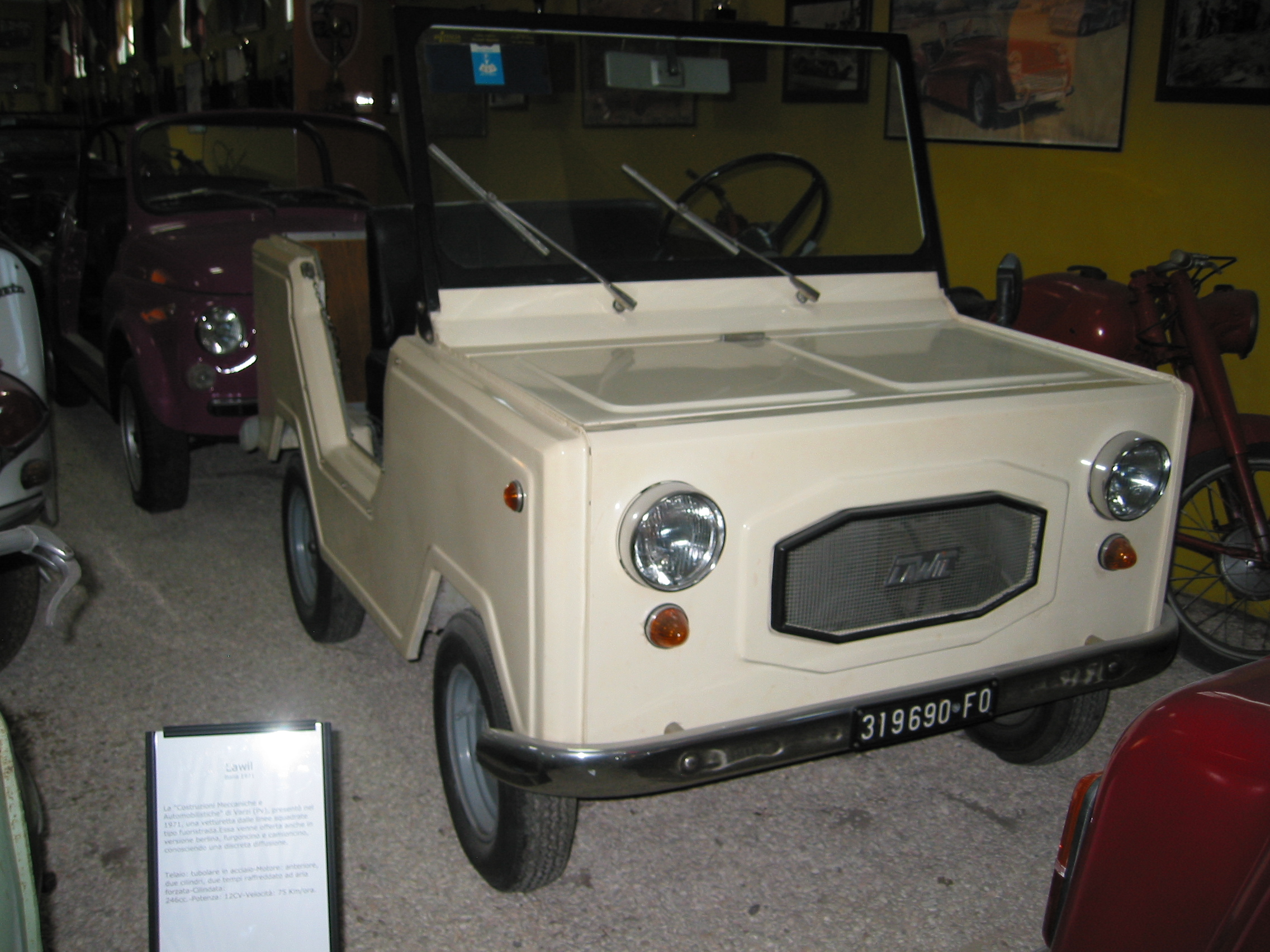
A 1971 built Lawil S3 in an Italian automobile museum

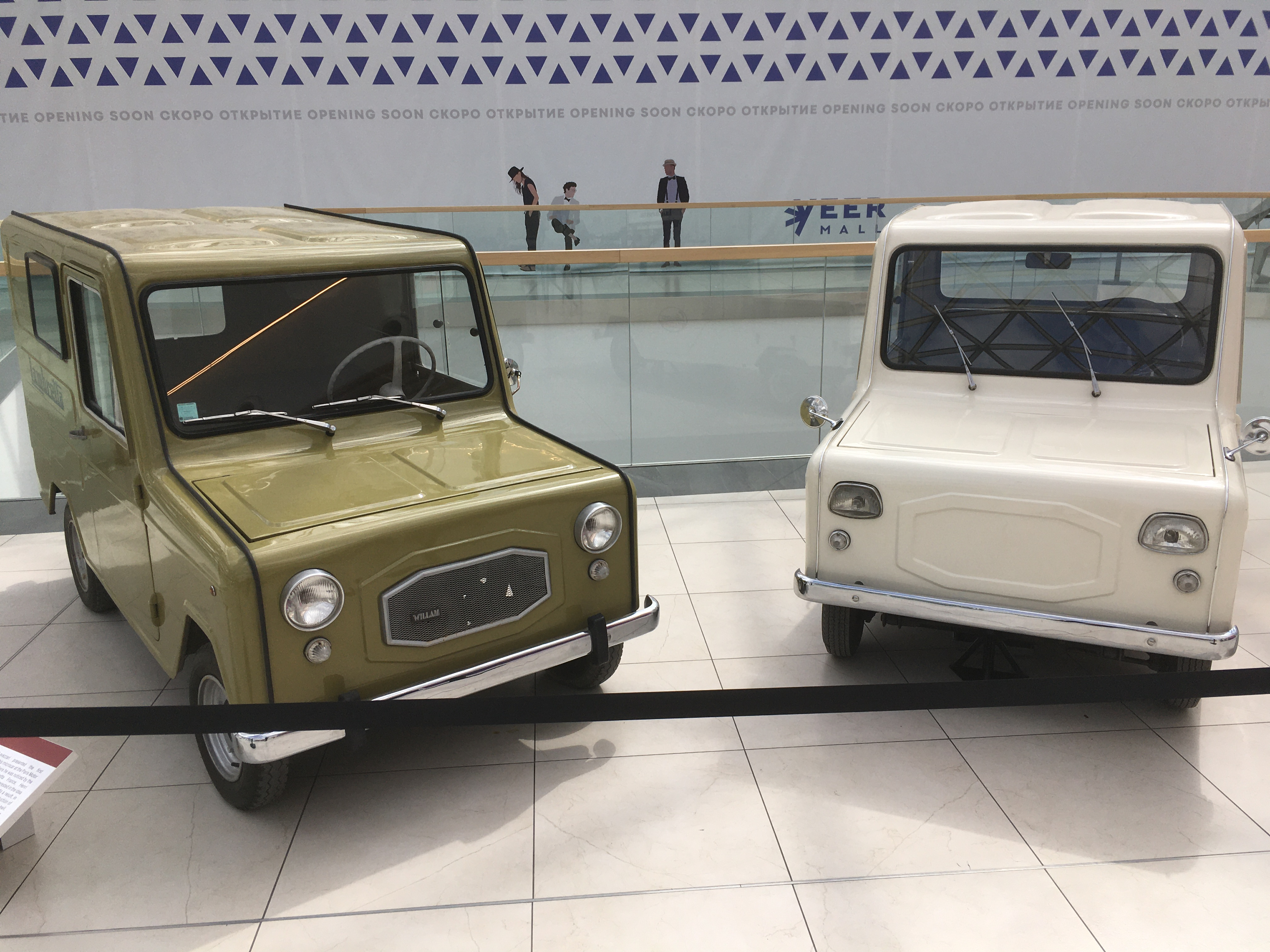
Lawil Lambretta Willam Fourgonette and Lawil Pick-Up (C1) in the Yekaterinburg shopping center

The Lawil S.p.A. is a former Italian automobile manufacturer that began production in 1967. Lawil was located in Pavia, Lombardia. Lawil S.p.A. was a part of the French Lambretta and the Italian Innocenti.

Composition of the brand name: Henri Willame (Director of the French Lambretta) + Carlo Lavezzari (Designer) = LAvezzari + WILlame

Following models were available:

- Lawil Farmer (S1) 123cc (1968-1971, F) / Lawil Varzina (S3) 250cc (1970 - 1980, ITA)
- Lawil Farmer II 125cc (1975-1980, F)
- Lawil Berlina (S4) 250cc (ITA) / Willam City (A1 to A3) 123cc and 175cc (1967-1971, F) / Willam City (A4 and A5) 125cc (1971-1980, F)
- Lawil Pick-Up (C1) 123cc (until 1977, F)
- Willam Fourgonnette (C2) 125cc (1968-1988, only sold in France)
- Willam Break (C4) 125cc
