= Casalini =

Italian vehicle company

Coordinates: 45.0346072°N 9.7044338°E

- Company type: Società a responsabilità limitata
- Founded: 1939
- Founder: Giovanni Casalini
- Headquarters: Piacenza
- Products: Automotive microcars
- Website: www.casalini.eu

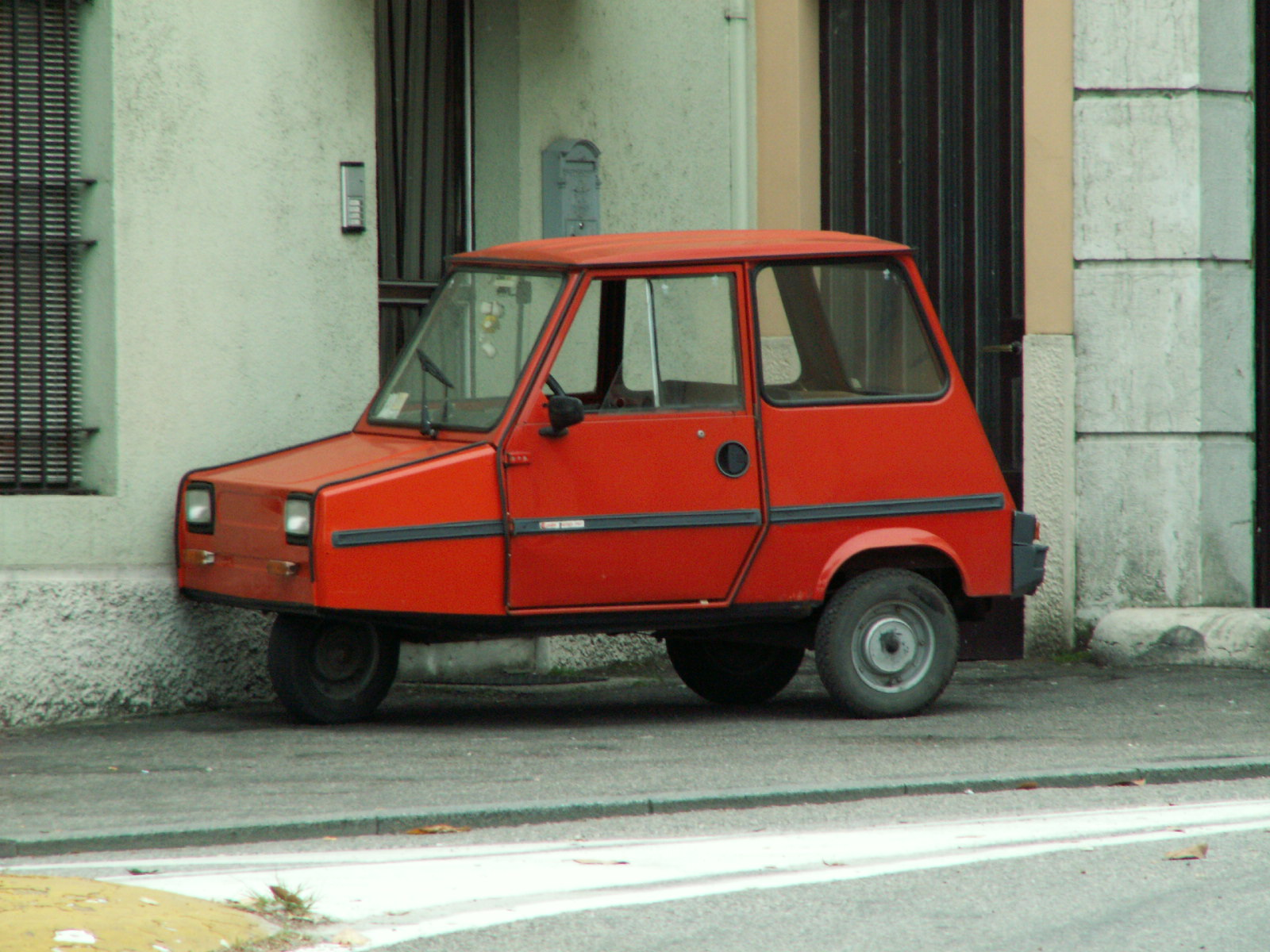
Casalini Sulky

Casalini (founded in 1939 by Giovanni Casalini) is an Italian company that designs, manufactures, and distributes "light vehicles". Founded in 1939, Casalini is one of the oldest microcar producers in the world. The Casalini production factory is located in Piacenza, Italy.

The current line of Casalini microcars have bodies made of reinforced fiberglass plastic and feature a 635cc diesel engine produced by Mitsubishi, with 3.9 kW (5.3 PS).

== History ==
The factory manufactured three-wheelers and moped bikes until the late 1960s. In 1969, they introduced their first microcar called the Sulky. The Sulky stood out in its class for featuring a steel monocoque body. It was primarily designed for non-licensed drivers and equipped with an engine under 50 cc, specifically a 49.6 cc Vespa TL3 engine. A 125 cc version was also available. The Sulky was also exported to France, where it was sold by the local Lambretta distributor as the Willam Sulky.

A four-wheeled model with a slightly longer body was also developed exclusively for export called the Willam Lambretta. It was produced with two engine options; 49 cc and 125 cc. the larger-engined version was given rectangular headlamps rather than round ones. Both the William Sulky and Lambretta had rear-wheel-drive and coil springs, with wishbone front suspension being exclusive to the Lambretta. Over 10,000 units of the first Sulky were produced.

After 1994, when Italy accepted European directive 92/61, Casalini S.R.I. began to produce light quadricycles for sale in Italy as well, starting with the Kore 500. The developments of this vehicle were called Sulkydea (1996), Ydea (2000), Sulkydea LV (2004), and Sulky (2008). Over the past few years, the production of two transport and leisure vehicles have been added: Kerry and Pickup. In 2010, the M10 was announced, a four-wheeled vehicle also available in a sporty "Daytona" variant.

Two other connected companies supply Casalini S.R.I in the production of Sulky, Kerry, and the Sulky Pickup. Mech-Plant S.R.I, involved with the metallic aspects of the vehicles, and Target S.R.I, Which is involved with the plastic/ABS (acrylonitrile butadiene styrene) aspects of the vehicles. The Sulky (now the M10), Kerry, and Pickup models feature corrosion-treated steel frames and composite material bodies. These cars feature glass doors, front and rear disc brakes, and a safety speed limit of 45 km/h (28 mph). Casalini S.R.I operates in all European Union markets.

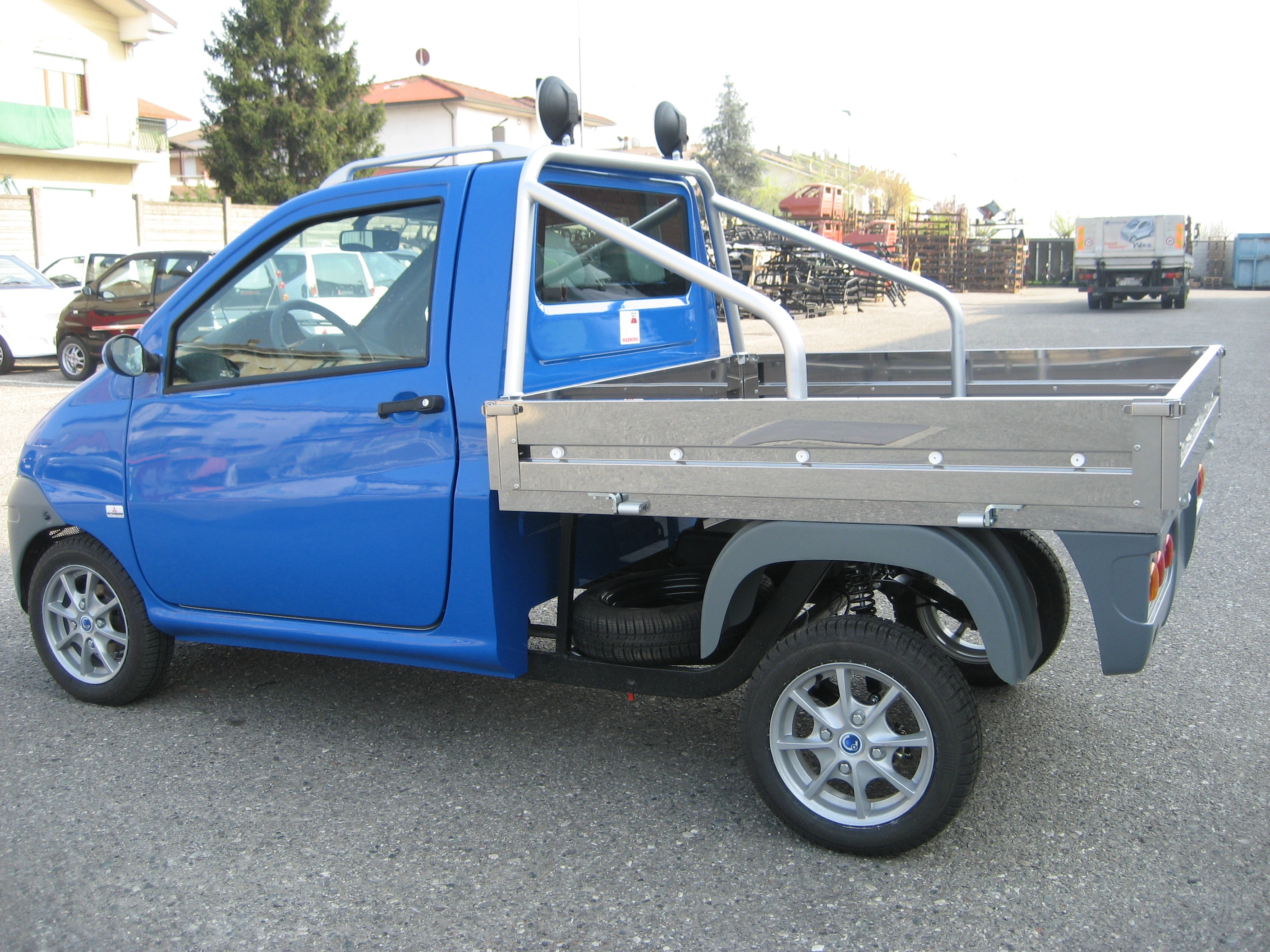
Casalini Sulky truck

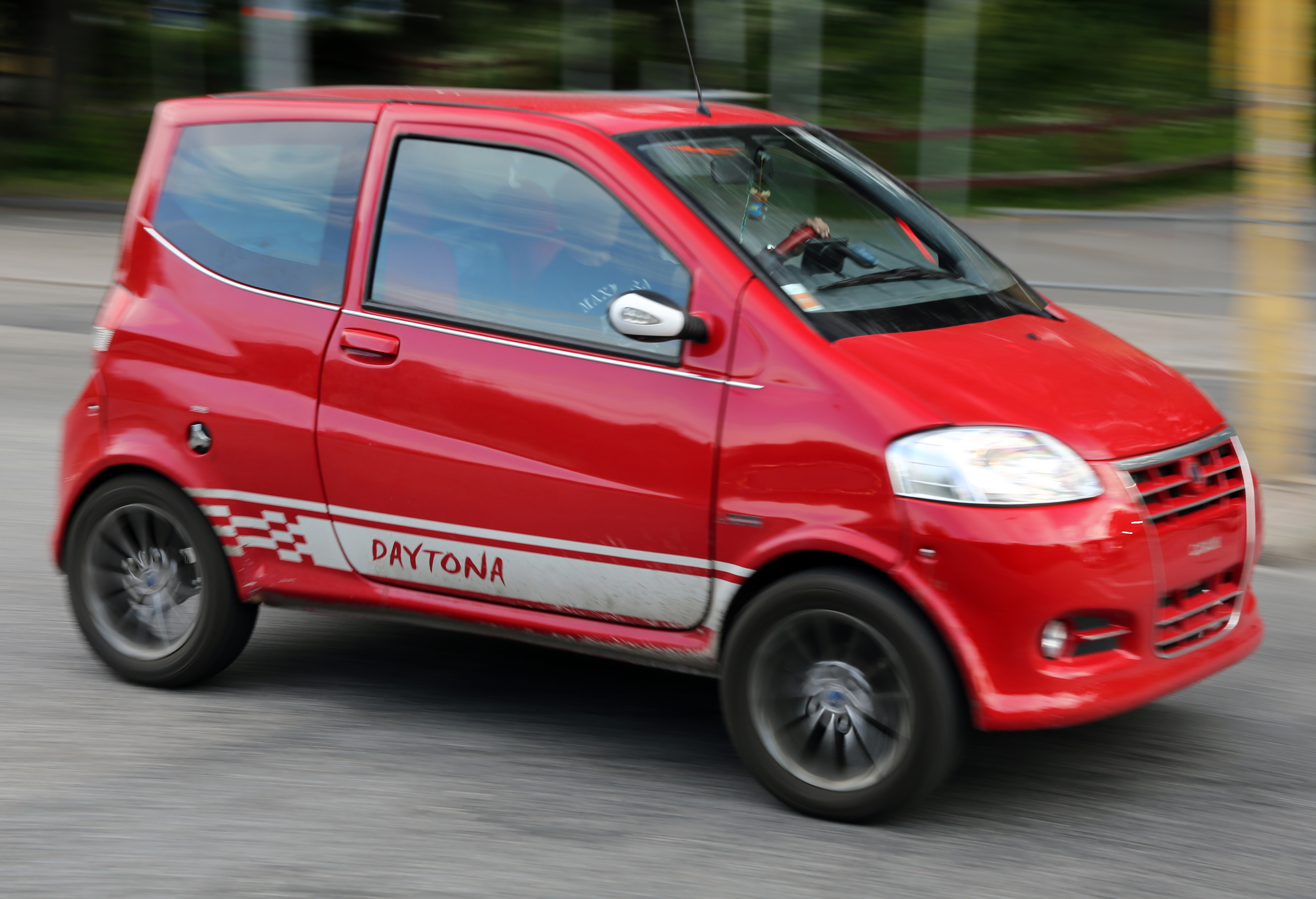
2011 Casalini M10 Daytona

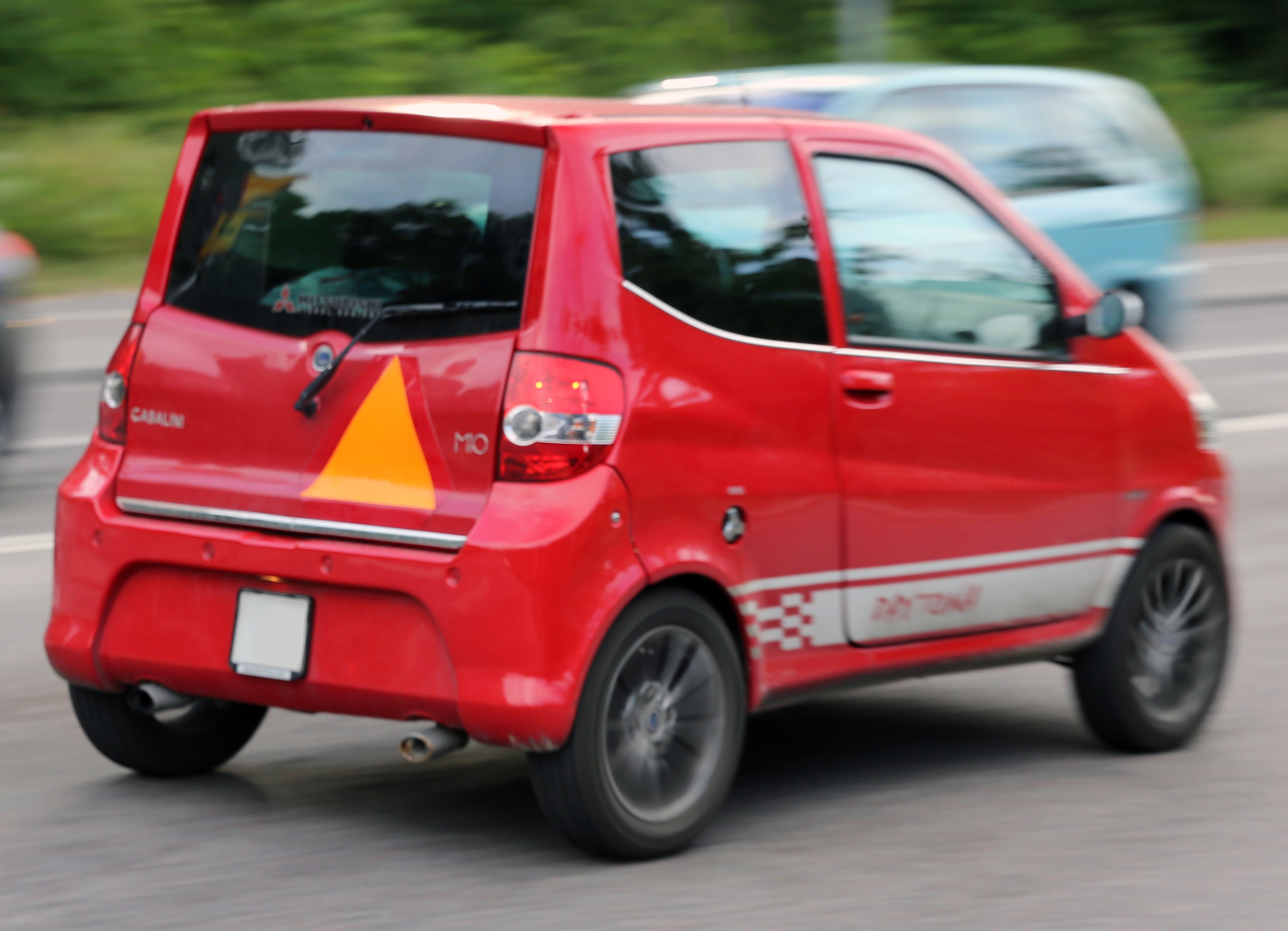
2011 Casalini M10 Daytona (rear)
