= IATO =

Defunct car manufacturer

- Industry: Automotive
- Founded: 1985
- Fate: Defunct

IATO (Indutria Automobili TOscana) was an Italian car manufacturer which produced a single model from 1985 to 1993.

== History ==
IATO was founded in 1985 in Pontedera, Italy. The only car produced by the company was a small SUV created to compete with the Suzuki SJ.

The IATO was assembled in Nusco and featured FIAT mechanical parts, including the engine from a FIAT Croma; it was also built around a steel chassis with fiberglass body panels.

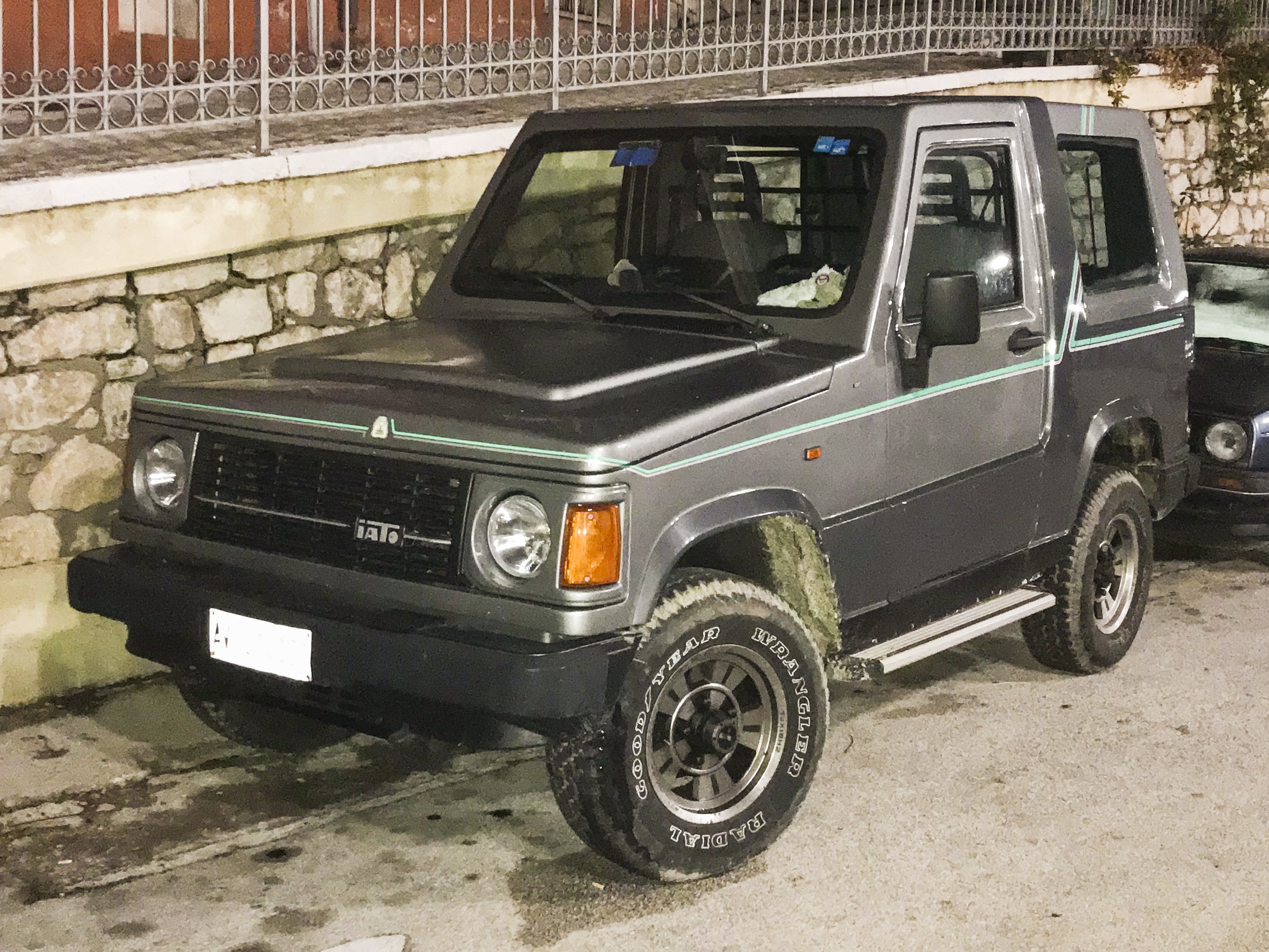
IATO 4x4 In Nusco

The company declared bankruptcy in 1993 after having only produced 182 SUVs.
