= Ferves =

Italian automobile manufacturer

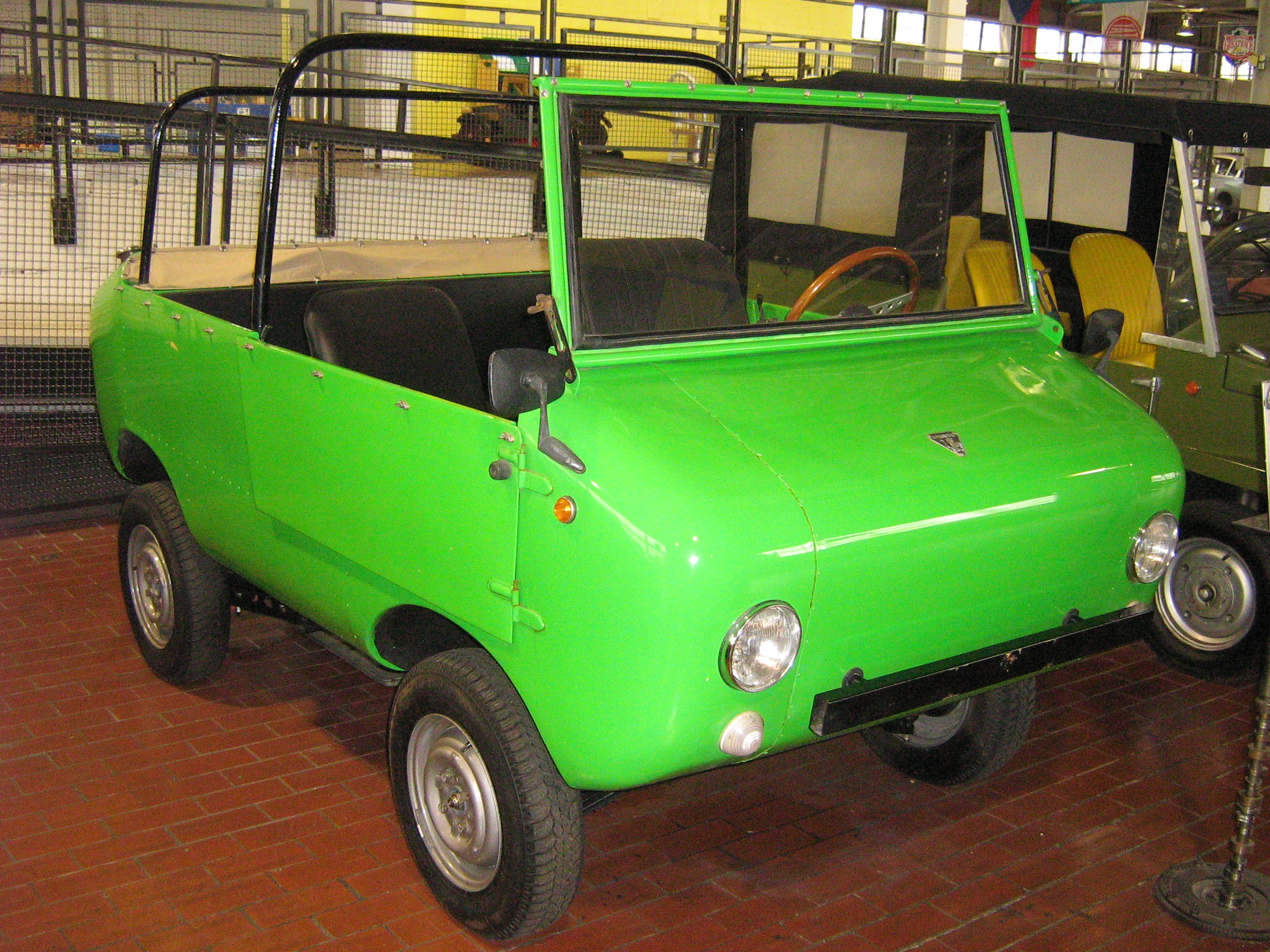
1965 Ferves Ranger 4x4

The Ferves was an Italian automobile manufacturer from 1965 until 1970.

== History ==
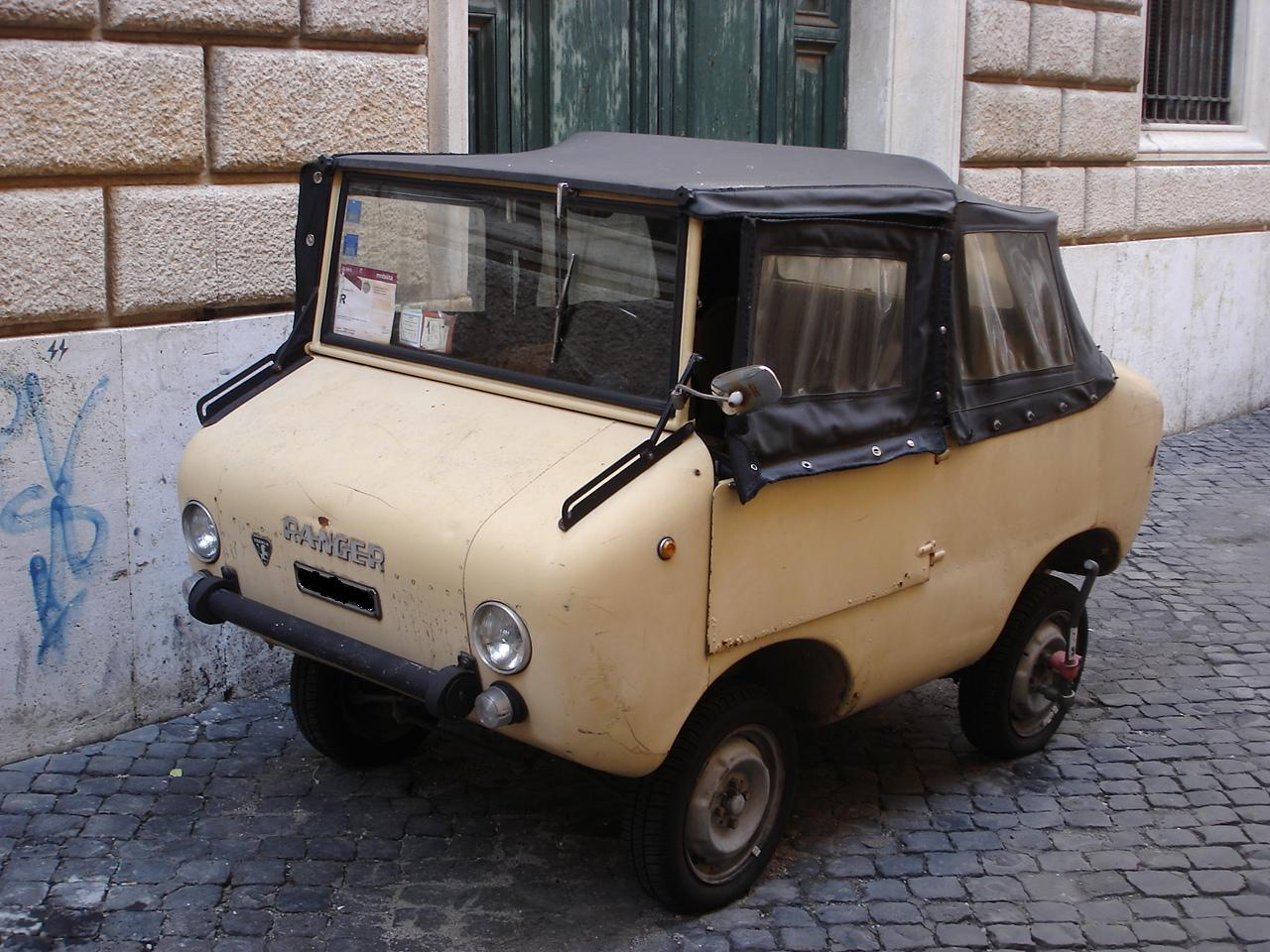
A Ferves Ranger in Rome (2011)

First seen at the 1966 Turin Motor Show, Ferves (FERrari VEicoli Speciali) introduced the Ranger as a small "off-road" derivative of the Fiat 500 and Fiat 600.

== Ferves Ranger ==
The car had an open body with 4 vinyl-covered seats, a folding windscreen, and removable suicide doors on early models, later models had normally hinged doors. It was a multi-purpose car powered by a rear-mounted 499 cc two-cylinder in-line engine. It was available as a two-wheel drive or four wheel drive and had a maximum speed of around 45 mph. There was also a cargo version with a carrying capacity of 300 kg. The engine and steering were from the Fiat 500 and the suspension and brakes from the Fiat 600. The chassis numbers commenced at 300 for the passenger version and 100 for the cargo. All 600 cars built were left hand drive.

== Museum ==
A Ferves Ranger is on display at the Lane Motor Museum in Nashville.
