= Fornasari =

Italian car manufacturer

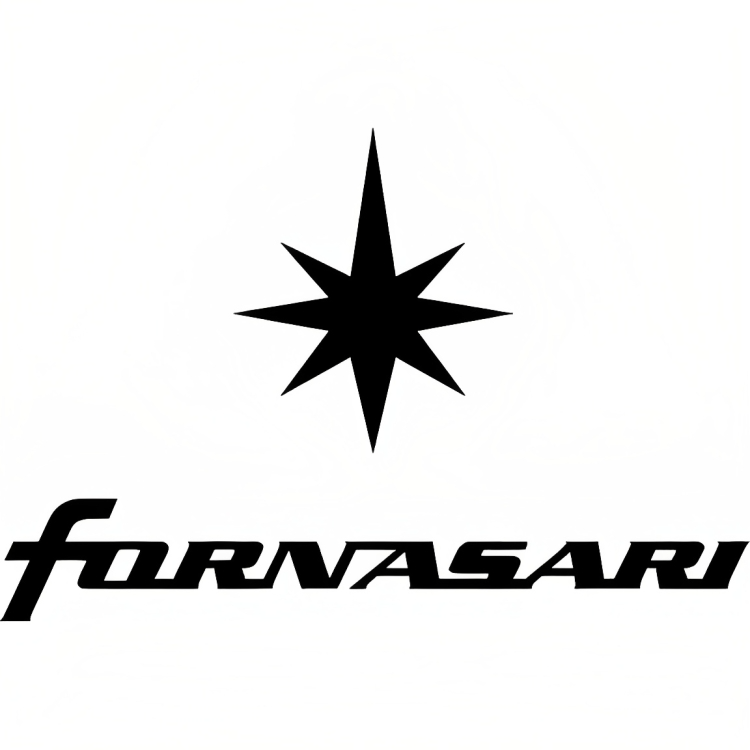
- Industry: Automotive
- Founded: 1999
- Founder: Giuseppe Fornasari
- Defunct: 2015 (rose again from 2019)
- Headquarters: Vicenza, Montebello Vicentino, Italy
- Products: Automobiles
- Website: fornasaricars.com

Fornasari was an Italian car manufacturer that was created in 1999 by Giuseppe Fornasari. The company made sports cars and SUVs, entering the market when Italian cars were dominating the sports car scene. Their first vehicle was an odd three-door SUV fitted with a Chevy-sourced engine. A couple of years later, the company started venturing into more conventional sports cars.

Fornasari was declared bankrupt by the Tribunal of Vicenza on 9 September 2015, but rose again with their new model, the Gigi 311 GT at the 2019 Geneva Motor Show.

== Models ==
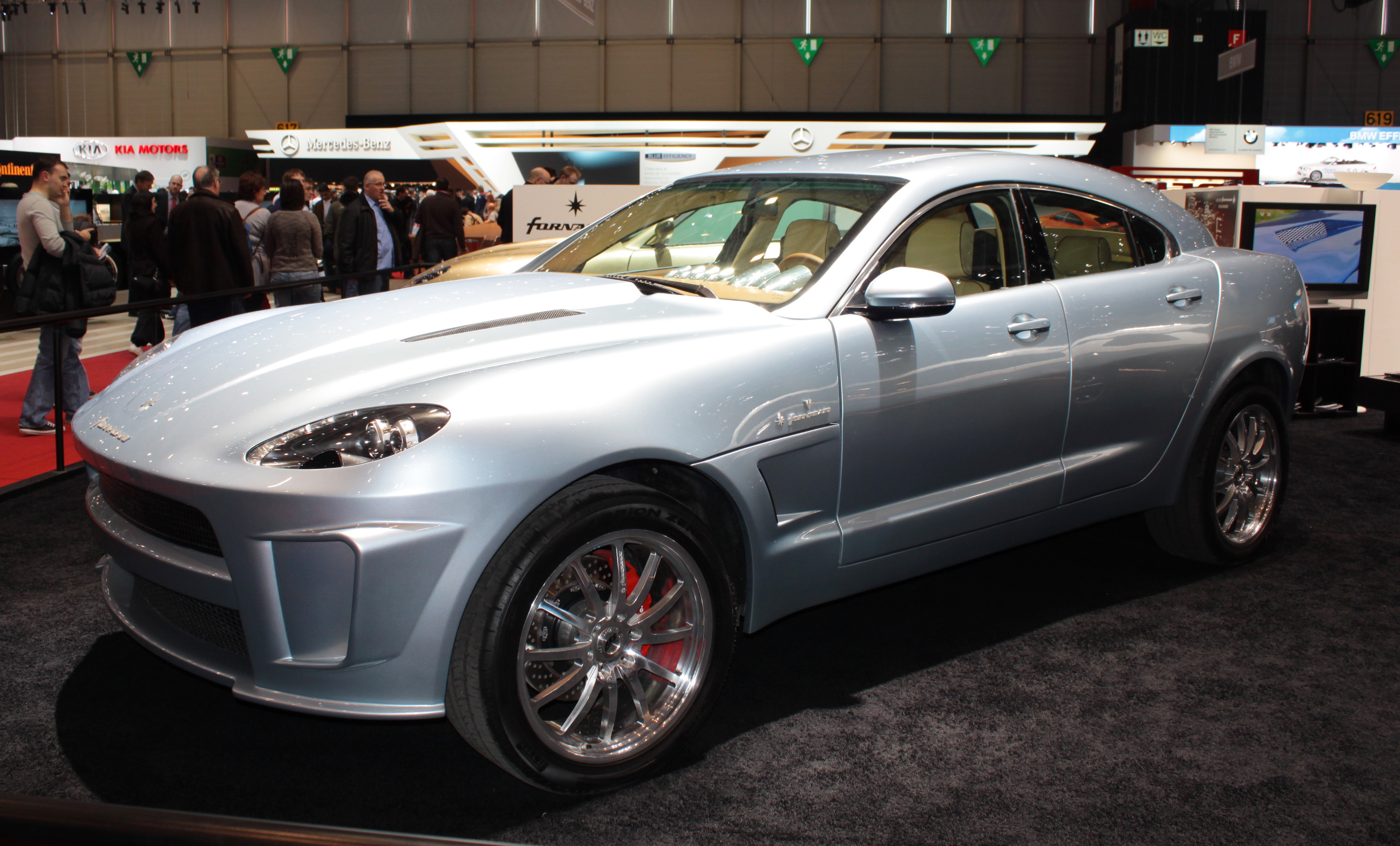
Fornasari RR99 at the 2011 Geneva Motor Show

Model lineup:

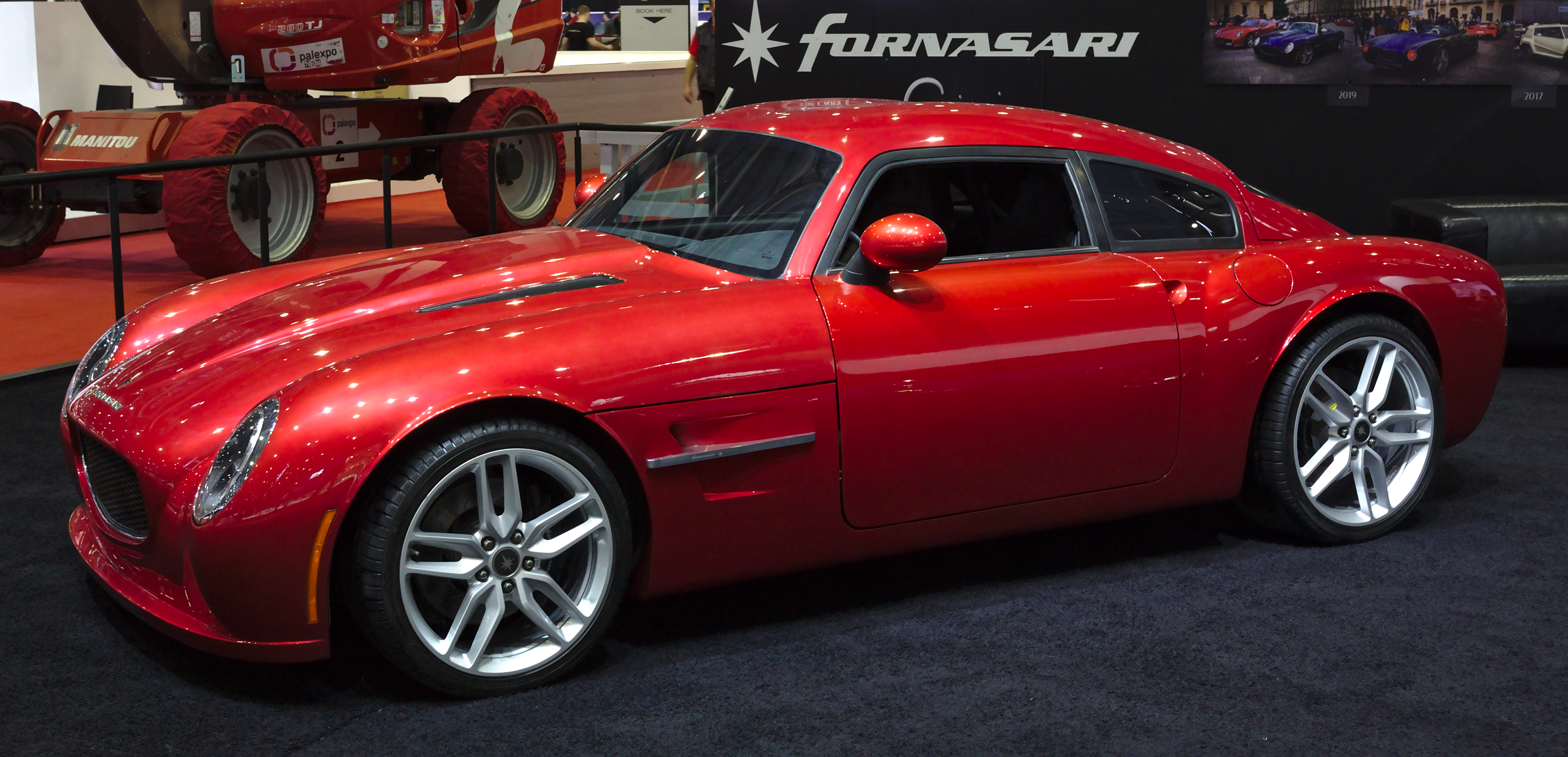
Fornasari Gigi 311 GT at the 2019 Geneva Motor Show

- Fornasari LM (Le Mans) (1996), a coupé based on the Callaway Le Mans cars, which mounts a 5700cc v8 with 450 PS (331 kW) at 5700 rpp, speed> 300 km/h (186 mph)
- Fornasari RR450 (2003), a three-door SUV mounted with a Chevrolet engine with 450 hp, Speed 280 km/h (174 mph), 0–100 km/h in 4.5 sec
- Fornasari RR600 (2004 —), a three-door SUV mounted with a Chevrolet engine with 600 hp, Speed 280 km/h (174 mph), 0–100 km/h in 4.2 sec
- Fornasari Gruppo B (2007 —), a non-offroad "hot hatch" version of the RR450/RR600.
- Fornasari Tender (2008 —), a two-door offroad pickup with yacht-like styling.
- Fornasari RR99 (2009 —), a four-door SUV mounted with a Chevrolet engine with 610 hp that does 0–100 km/h in 3.8 seconds with a top speed of 280 km/h (174 mph).
- Fornasari Racing Buggy (2009 —), a street legal three-door buggy made for racing.
- Fornasari Gigi 311 GT (2019 —), a two-seater sports car based on Maserati A6G/2000 Zagato, lying custom space frame with components sourced from the Corvette C7, including a V8 engine available with up to 641hp (650CV) and 590lb-ft (800Nm) of torque, a top speed can reach 340 km/h (211 mph).
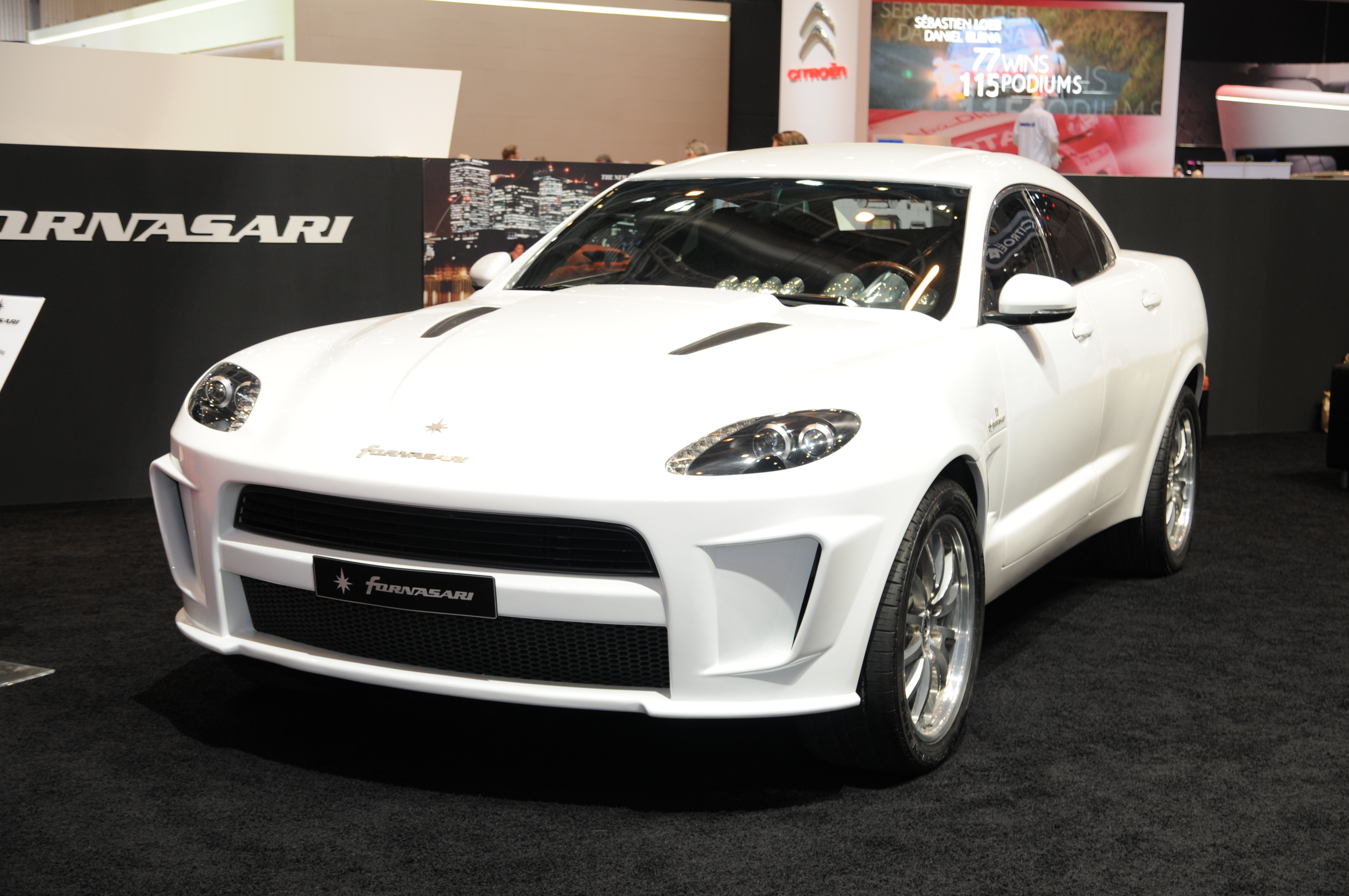
La Fornasari 99

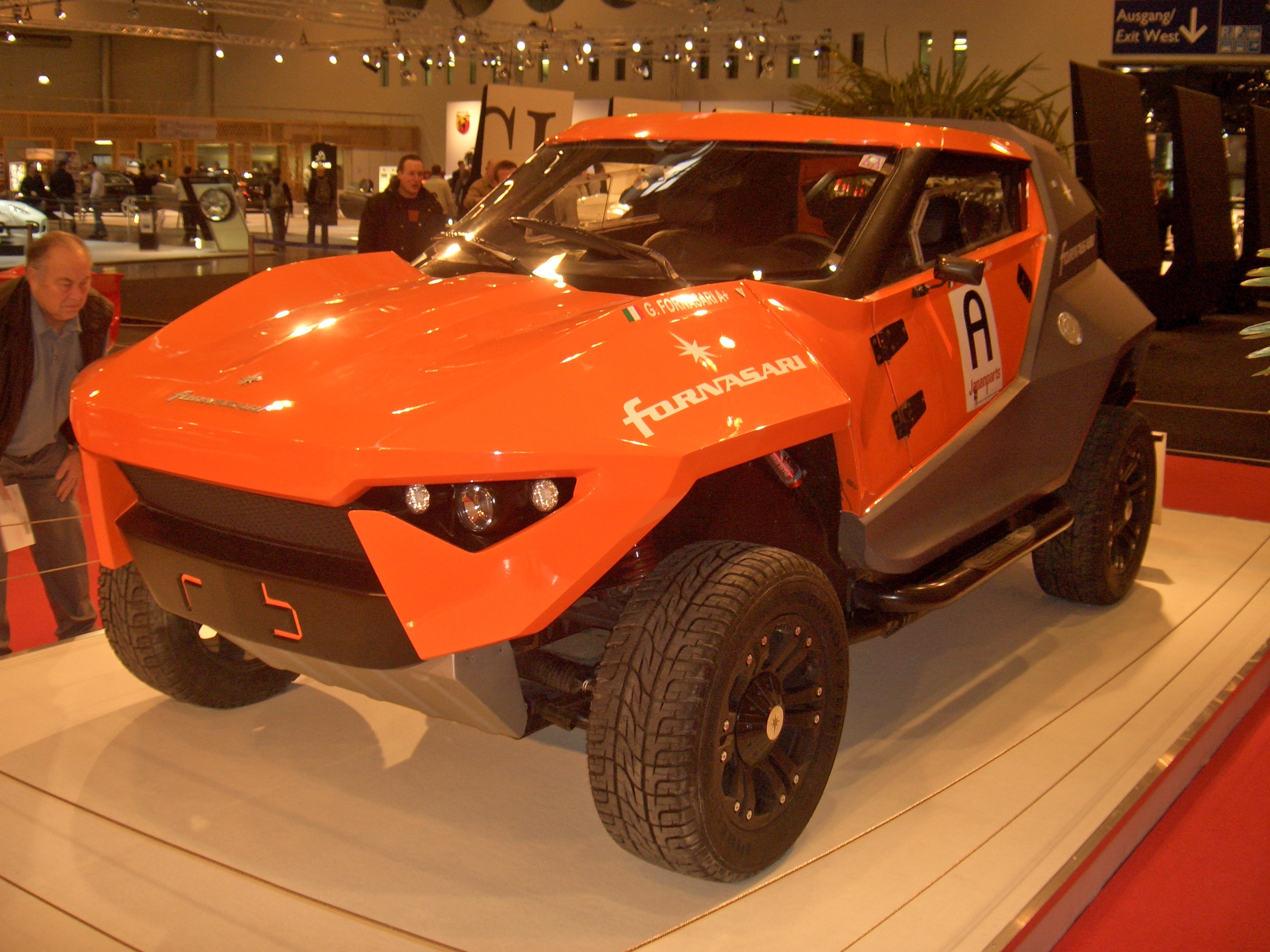
Il Fornasari Racing Buggy

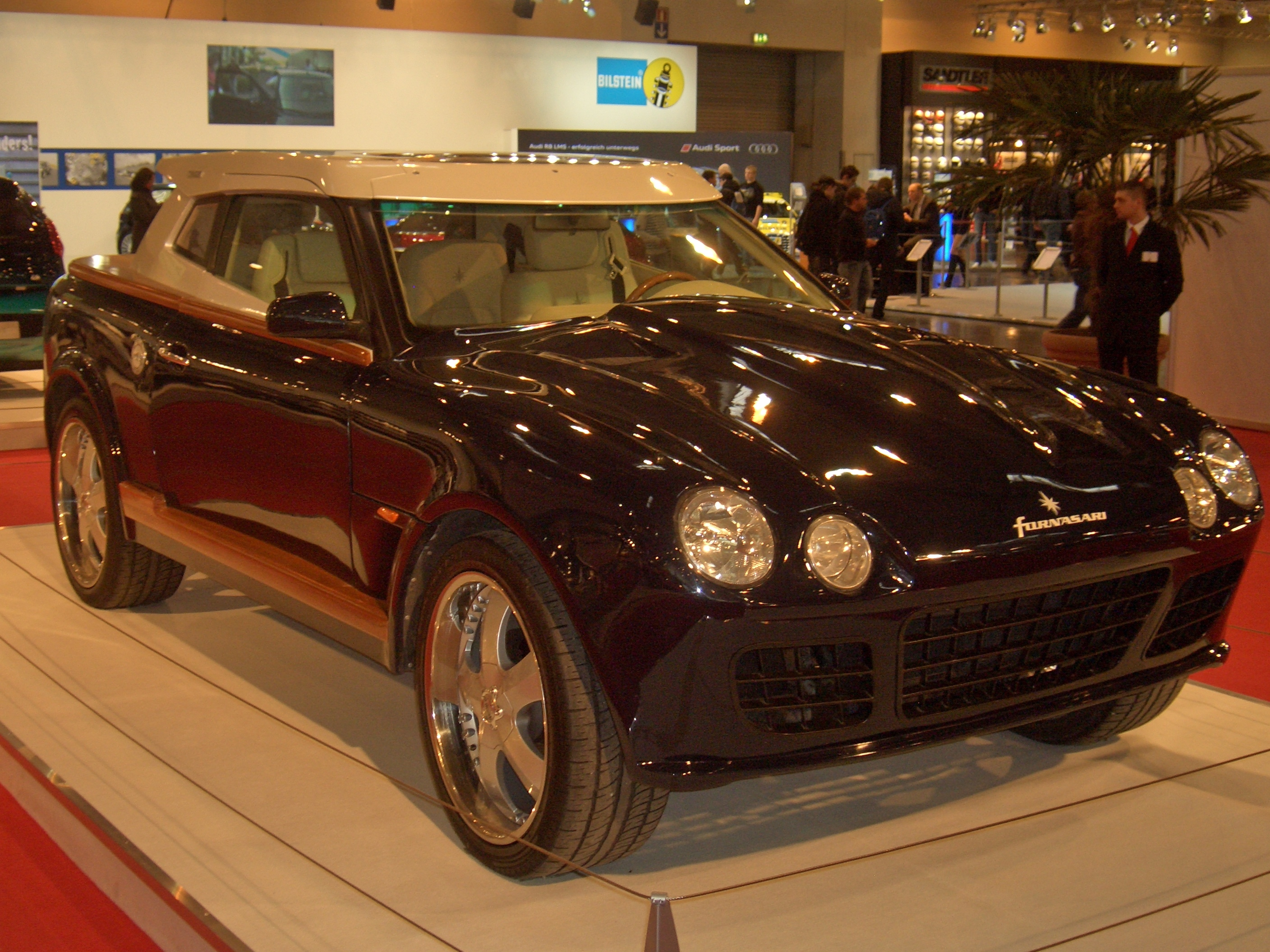
Il Fornasari Tender
