= Forthing T5 Evo =

Compact crossover SUV

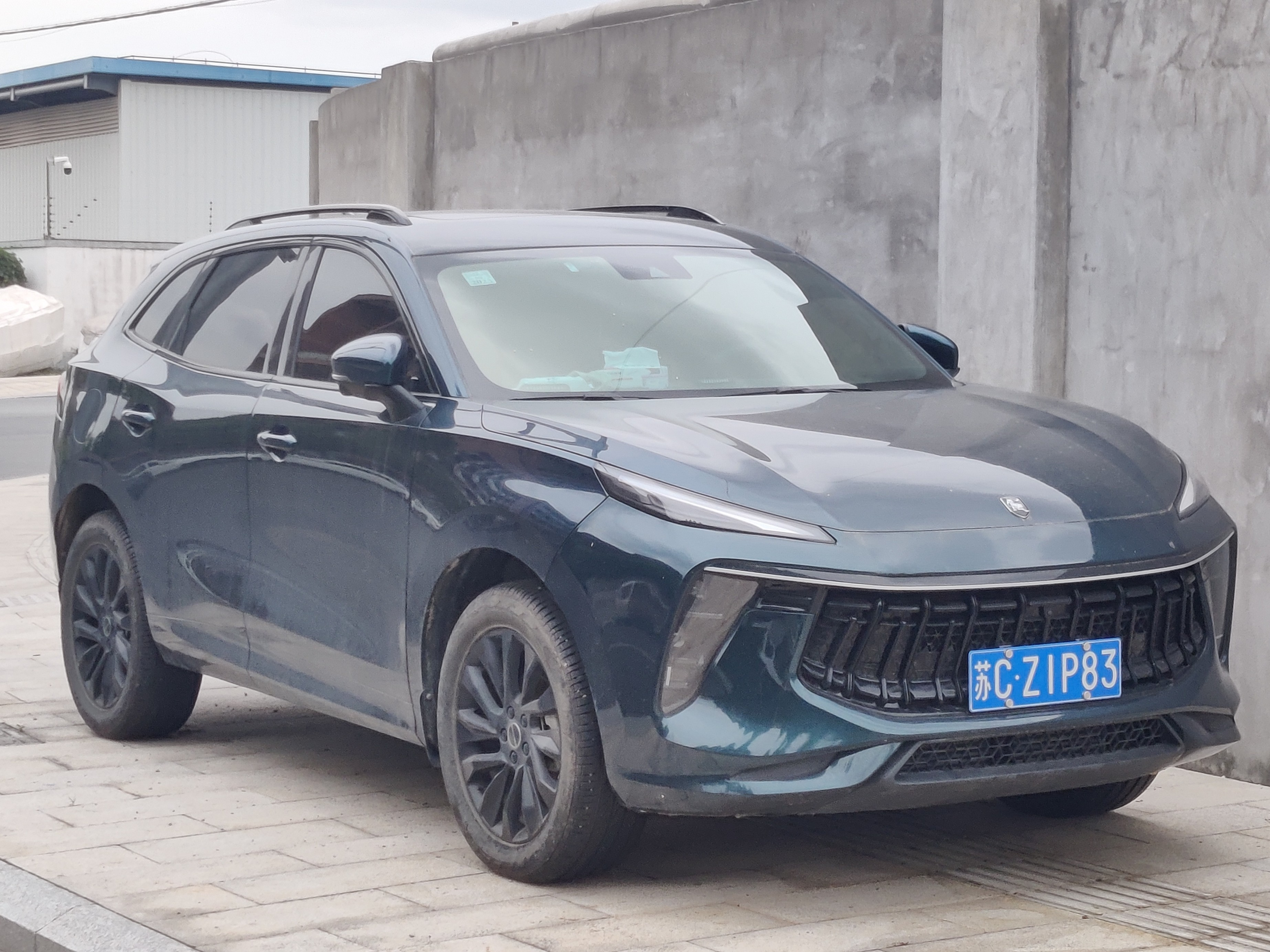

Overview
- Manufacturer: Forthing
- Also called: Forthing 5 (Europe); Forthing T-Five (Poland); Forthing Leiting (electric); Forthing Friday EV (electric in Europe and Southeast Asia); Forthing Friday REEV (Range extender in Southeast Asia); Forthing Taikon 5 (Australia); Lamari Eama (Iran); Cirelli 5 (Italy); Cirelli 5zero5 (Italy); EVO 6 (Italy); Evolute i‑SKY (Russia); SEV Friday 410 (Mexico)
- Production: 2020–present
- Assembly: China: Liuzhou (Dongfeng Liuzhou Motor); Iran: Khomein (Arian Pars Motor)
- Designer: Henning Knoepfle; Gai Wei

Body and chassis
- Class: Compact crossover SUV (C)
- Body style: 5-door SUV
- Layout: Front-engine, front-wheel-drive (ICE & HEV); Front-engine + Front-motor, front-wheel-drive (REEV); Front-motor, front-wheel-drive (EV)
- Platform: Dongfeng EMA (ICE & HEV); EMA-E (EV)
- Related: Forthing Xinghai X5; Forthing Yacht

Powertrain
- Engine: Petrol: 1.5 L 4A95TD turbo I4; Petrol hybrid: 1.5 L 4E15T CT-E I4 + electric motor; Petrol REEV: 1.5 L 4F15N I4
- Electric motor: 1x AC PMSM (REEV, EV); 2x BYD TZ220XYL AC PMSM (HEV)
- Power output: 145 kW (194 hp; 197 PS) (ICE); 180 kW (241 hp; 245 PS) (HEV); 75 kW (101 hp; 102 PS) (engine; REEV); 120 kW (161 hp; 163 PS) (REEV); 150 kW (201 hp; 204 PS) (EV)
- Transmission: 6-speed manual; CVT; 7-speed dual-clutch; Dedicated Hybrid (DHT) (HEV); 1-speed direct-drive (EV)
- Hybrid drivetrain: Parallel (HEV); Range extender (REEV)
- Battery: 2 kWh Li-NMC (HEV); 31.9 kWh LFP; 57.8 kWh lithium iron phosphate (LFP); 64.4 kWh LFP; 85.9 kWh ternary lithium
- Electric range: 510 km (WLTP) 85.9 kwh; 430–630 km (267–391 mi) (CLTC, EV)

Dimensions
- Wheelbase: 2,715 mm (106.9 in)
- Length: 4,565 mm (179.7 in)
- Width: 1,860 mm (73.2 in)
- Height: 1,690 mm (66.5 in)
- Curb weight: 1,500 kg (3,307 lb)

The Forthing T5 Evo is a compact crossover SUV produced by Dongfeng Liuzhou Motor under the Forthing sub-brand. The pure electric variant launched in March 2023 is called Forthing Leiting.

== Overview ==
The Forthing T5 Evo was launched as a sportier variant of the Forthing T5 compact crossover sport utility vehicle under the Forthing brand of Dongfeng Motor Group for China, and officially debuted during the 2020 Guangzhou Auto Show in November 2020. The Forthing T5 Evo is also the first vehicle to wear the Forthing brand's freshly unveiled logo, the powerful lion badge (Jin Shi Biao, 劲狮标). The logo is in the shape of a shield with a lion graphic in the center, implying "self-confidence, fearlessness, and bravery" according to officials.

Rear view

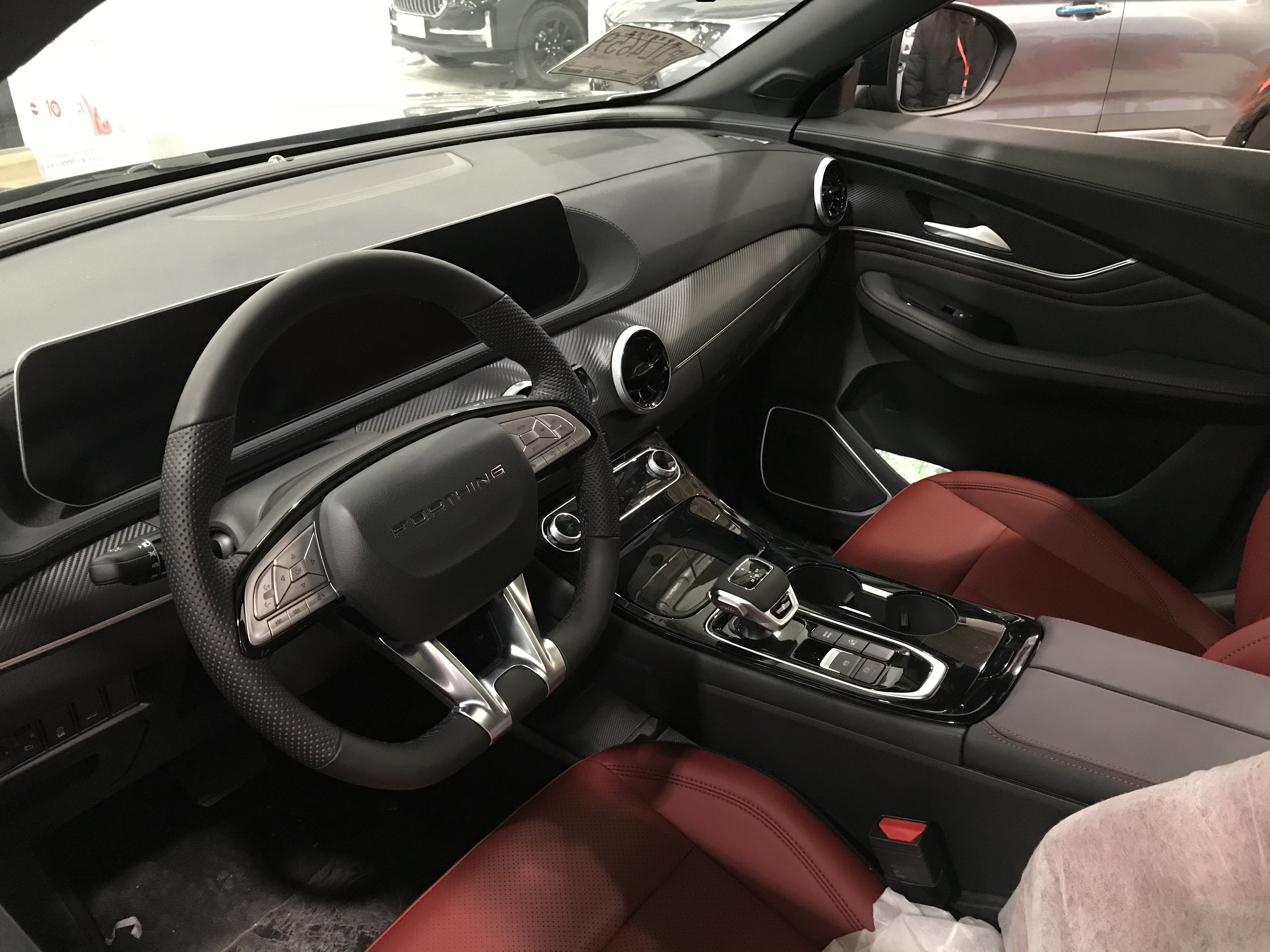
Interior

=== Features ===
The Forthing T5 Evo is equipped with L2 + intelligent driving assistance systems and the future link 4.0 intelligent link system. For the standard luxury trim models, T5 Evo has developed corrosion-resistant and self-healing 2K paint offering eight kinds of personalised colors. For the interior, the T5 Evo is equipped with 37 storage spaces including various hidden hooks, door panel storage capable of containing one litre water bottles and additional storage space for mobile phones and electronics.

== Powertrain ==
Power of the Forthing T5 Evo comes from a Mitsubishi-sourced 1.5-litre turbo engine producing a maximum power of 145 kW (194 hp; 197 PS) and maximum torque of 285 N⋅m (210 lb⋅ft; 29 kg⋅m), giving it a 0 to 100 km/h (0 to 62 mph) acceleration time of 9.5 seconds, and a fuel consumption of 6.6 L/100 km (43 mpg_{‑imp}; 36 mpg_{‑US}). There are two wheel sizes available in 235/55 R19 and 235/60 R18.

=== 2023 (facelift) ===
The Forthing T5 Evo received a facelift in May 2023, featuring revised front and rear end styling with a powertrain update. The high trim levels dubbed the Mach Editions is equipped with an updated engine codenamed DFMC15TP1 producing a torque of 300N·m mated to a wet style 7-speed dual clutch transmission.

Forthing T5 Evo 2023 (facelift)

Rear view

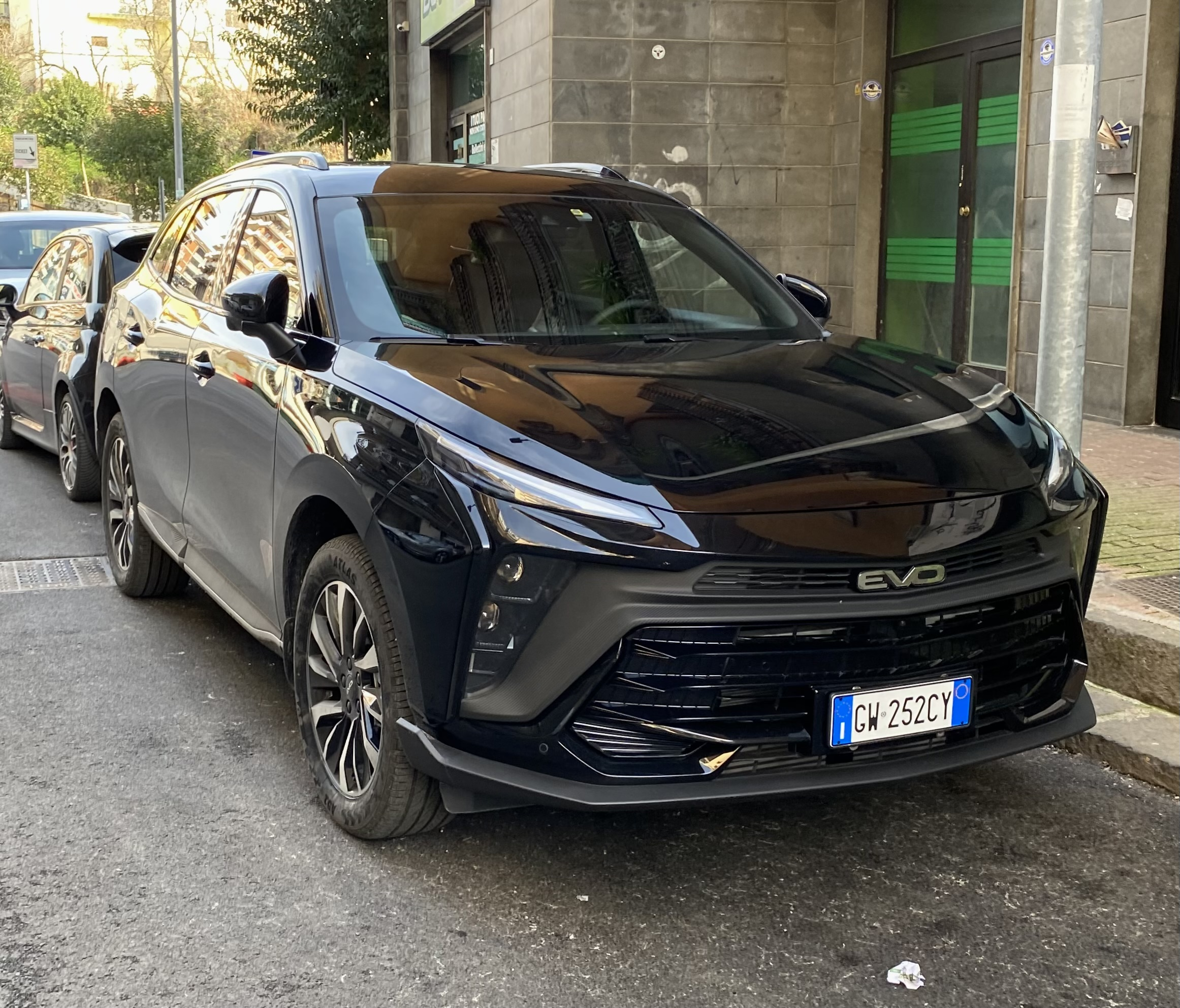
EVO 6 (Italy)

== Forthing T5 HEV/5 HEV ==
The Forthing T5 HEV or 5 HEV is a hybrid electric variant of the T5 Evo. The HEV powertrain is a CT-E engine derived from Citroen engine technologies and developed by Dongfeng Liuzhou Motor Co., Ltd. with an additional two-motor hybrid assembly, and a 2kwh battery pack. The Forthing 5 HEV was displayed during IAA 2023.

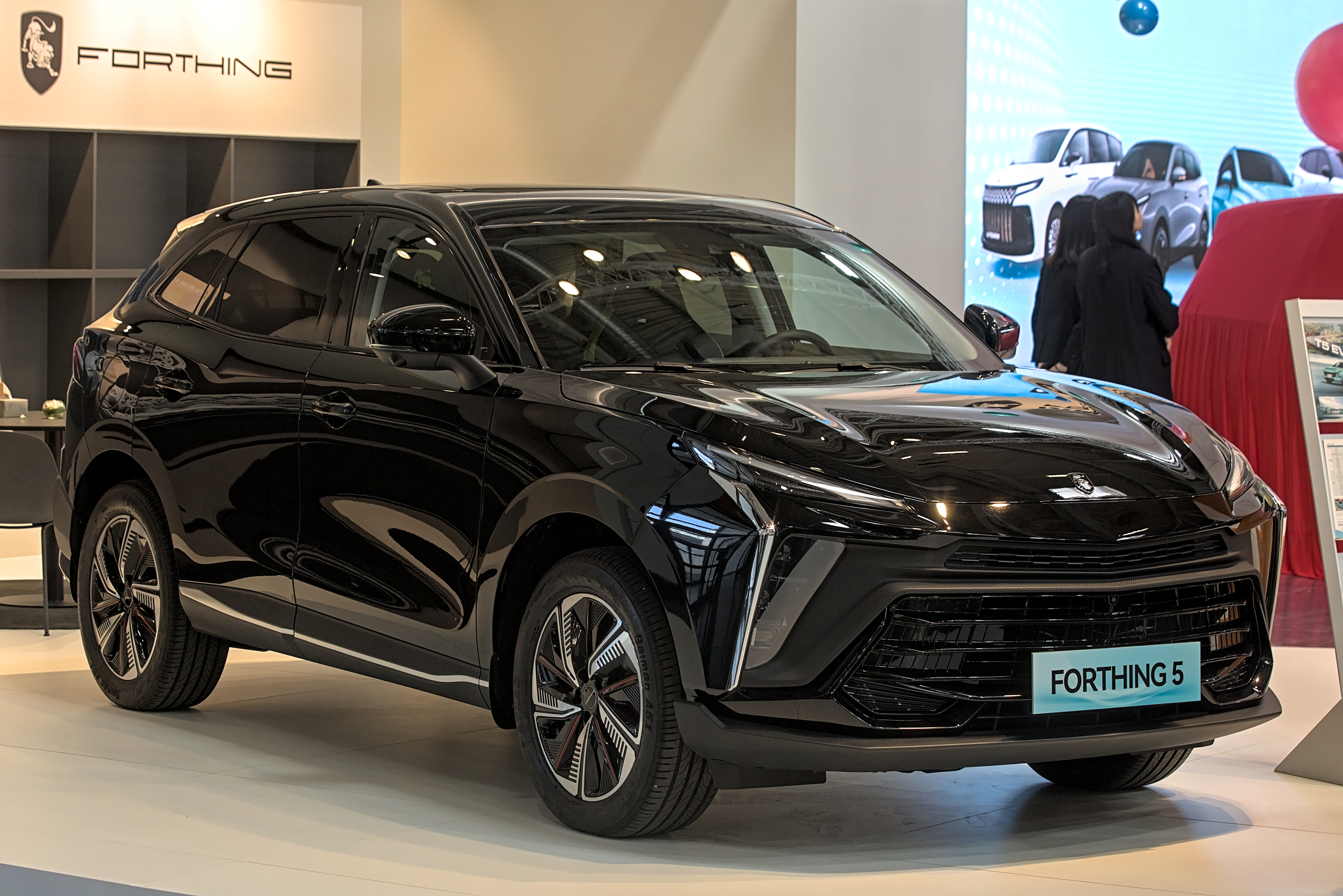
Forthing 5 HEV

== Forthing Leiting/Friday EV ==
The Forthing Leiting (雷霆) is the all-electric variant launched in March 2023. The vehicle is built on the EMA-E platform and shares most of its body with the T5 Evo. It is powered by a 150 kW (201 hp) BYD electric motor that delivers 340 N⋅m (251 lb⋅ft) of torque. Two battery options are available: a 57.8 kWh lithium iron phosphate battery and an 85.9 kWh ternary lithium battery pack. The electric CLTC range is 430 km (267 mi) and 630 km (391 mi) depending on the version. The versions sold in oversea markets is called the Friday EV and was displayed during IAA 2023. The european version was sold with the 85.9 kWh battery and have a WLTP range of 510 km (317 mi).

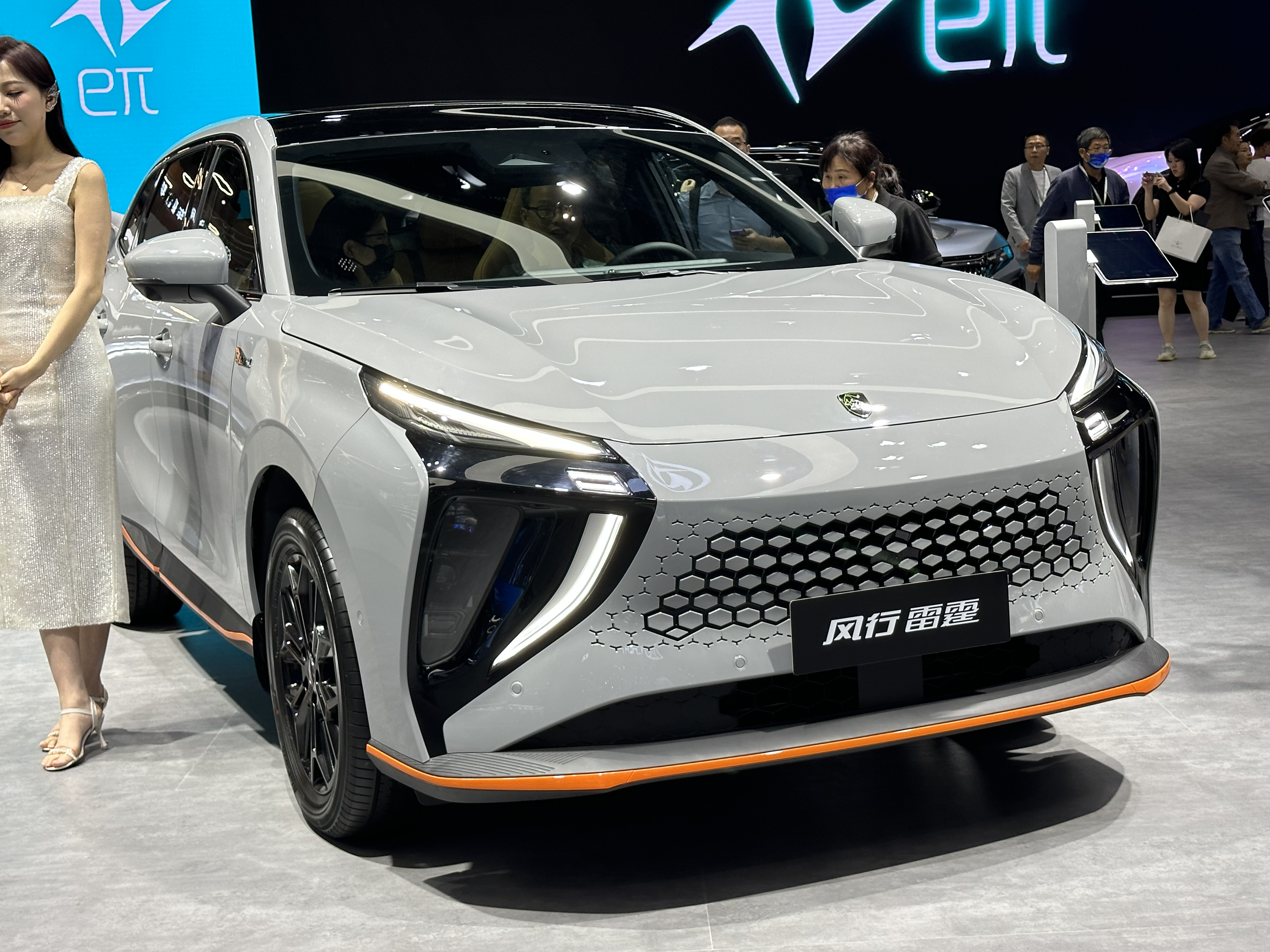
Forthing Leiting

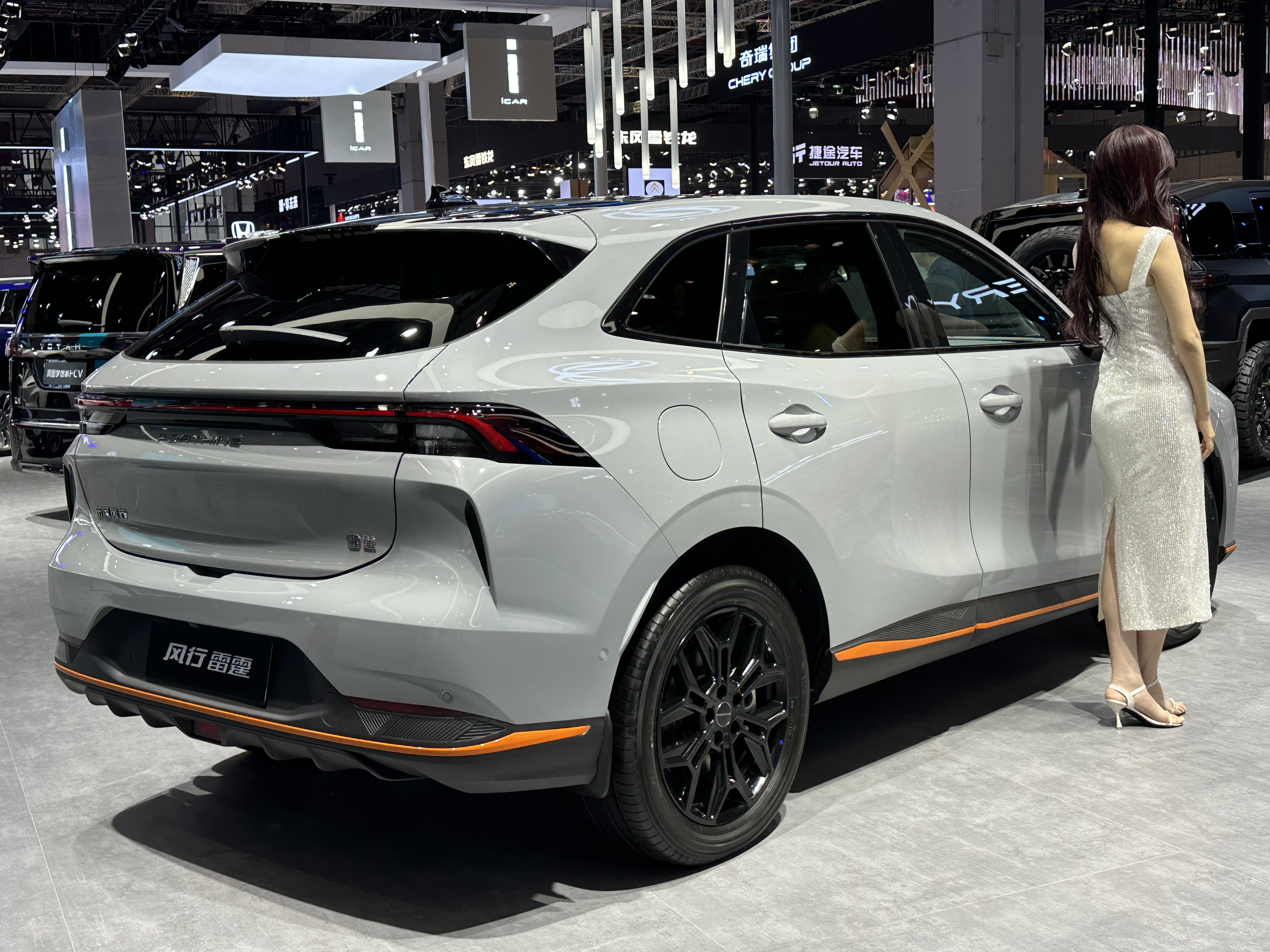
Rear view

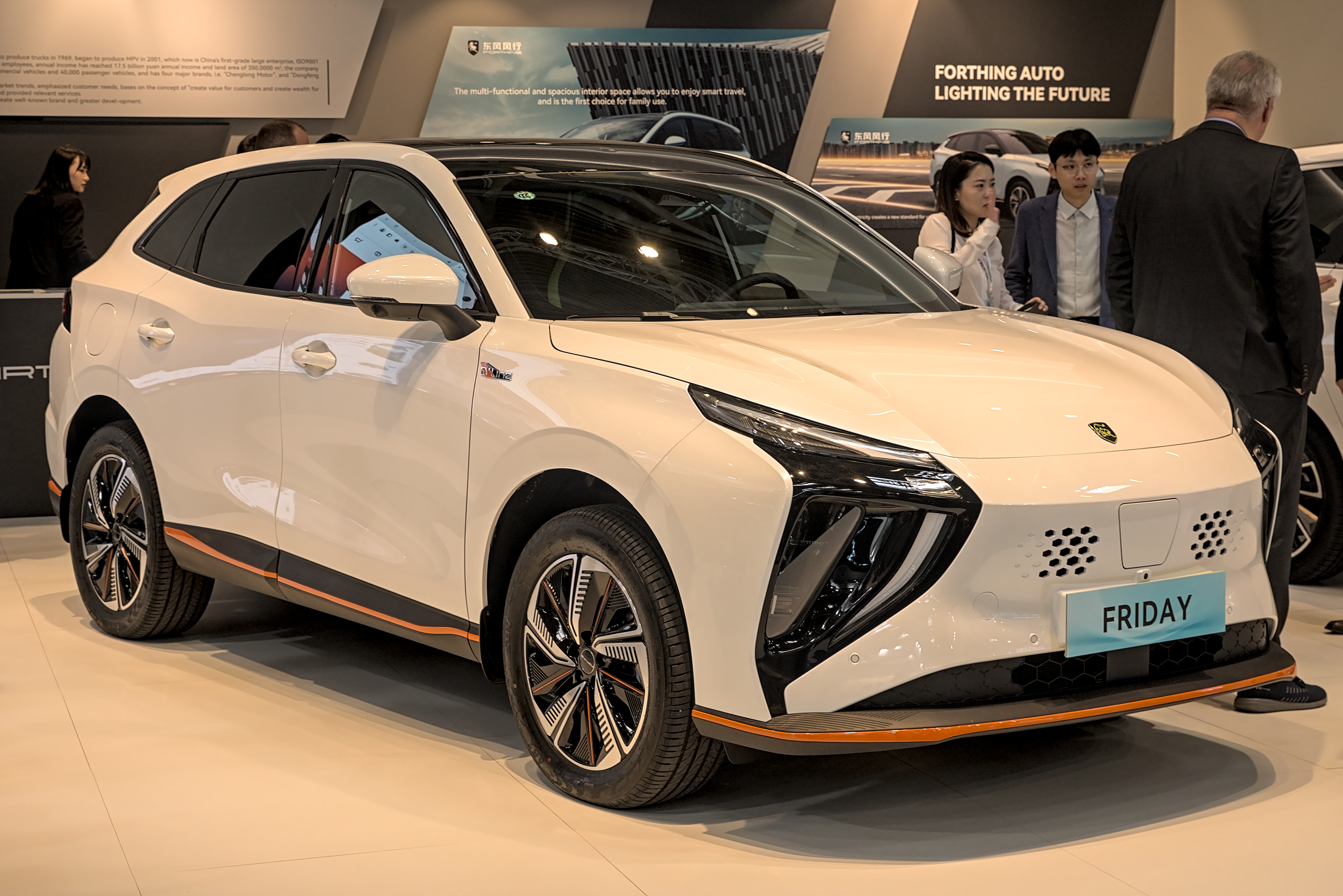
Forthing Friday EV at IAA 2023

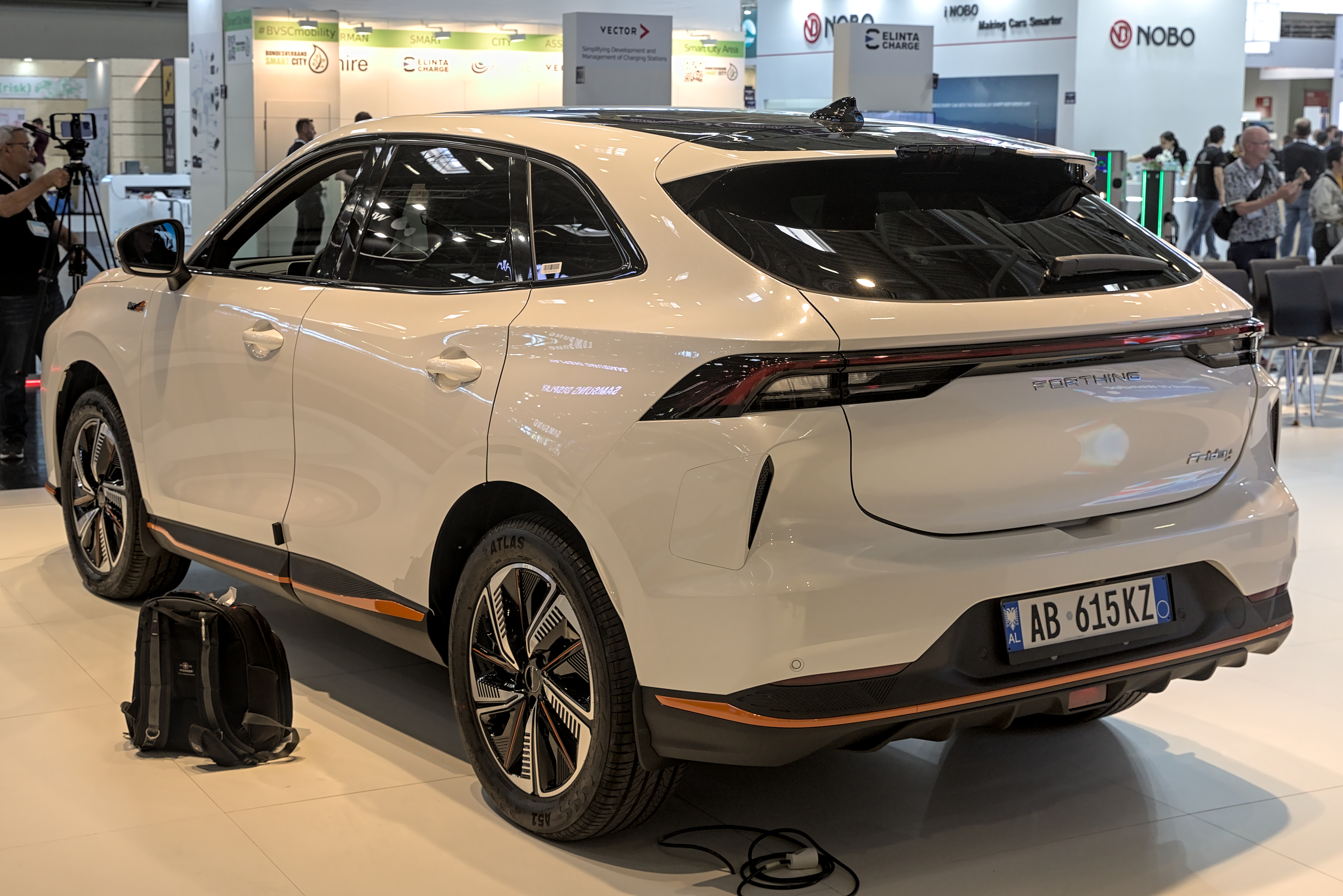
Rear view

== Safety ==
ASEAN NCAP test results Forthing Friday (BEV and REEV) (2025)
Test	Points
Overall:	5 /5 stars
Adult occupant:	39.78
Child occupant:	15.26
Safety assist:	17.14
Motorcyclist Safety:	15.00

== Forthing Xinghai X5/T5 ==
In September 2025, Forthing launched the Xinghai X5/T5, a facelift model of Leiting. It is basically a re-branded BEV variant as the third model in the Xinghai line. It features a front-mounted single electric motor with a maximum power of 163 hp (122 kW) and a peak torque of 240 N⋅m (177 lb⋅ft), equipped with a 64.4 kWh LFP battery, offering a CLTC range of 530 km (329 mi). Compared to the Leiting, the rear suspension has been upgraded from a torsion beam to a multi-link suspension.

Forthing Xinghai T5

Rear view

== Markets ==
The Forthing T5 Evo is sold Iran as Lamari Eama since 2022. It is locally assembled in Khomeyn, Markazi.

The Forthing T5 Evo started being sold in Belarus in January 2024.

The Forthing T5 Evo from 2023, officially sold in Germany, Italy, Croatia, Slovenia, Poland, Czech Republic, Slovakia, Hungary, Holland, Bulgaria and Panama. In Italy, the Forthing T5 Evo is available with a dual-fuel petrol-LPG option and a 1.5 full-hybrid DCT7 245 HP version.

Starting in September 2024, the name Forthing Friday EV will be used instead of Forthing T5 Evo in Europe.

== Sales ==
T5 Evo
Year	China
2022	45,395
2023	8,951
2024	2,298
2025	605

Leiting
Year	China
2023	2,204
2024	1,404
2025	1,186
