= Forthing Xinghai X5 =

Battery electric compact crossover SUV

- Forthing Xinghai T5

Overview
- Manufacturer: Forthing
- Also called: Forthing Xinghai T5; Forthing TK5 (Europe, Thailand); Yema Auto S5
- Production: 2025–present
- Assembly: China: Liuzhou

Body and chassis
- Class: Compact crossover SUV (C)
- Body style: 5-door SUV
- Layout: Front-engine, front-wheel-drive
- Platform: Super Cube EMA
- Related: Forthing T5 Evo

Powertrain
- Electric motor: Permanent magnet synchronous
- Battery: 64.4 kWh LFP
- Electric range: 530 km (329 mi) (CLTC)

Dimensions
- Wheelbase: 2,715 mm (106.9 in)
- Length: 4,600 mm (181.1 in)
- Width: 1,860 mm (73.2 in)
- Height: 1,680 mm (66.1 in)
- Curb weight: 1,500 kg (3,307 lb)

Chronology
- Predecessor: Forthing Leiting (China, pre-facelift)

The Forthing Xinghai X5 (Chinese: 风行 星海X5; pinyin: Fengxing Xinghai X5) is a battery electric compact crossover SUV produced by Dongfeng Liuzhou Motor under the Forthing brand. The Forthing Xinghai X5 is the third model in the Xinghai line.

== Overview ==
It features a front-mounted single electric motor with a maximum power of 163 hp (122 kW; 165 PS) and a peak torque of 240 N⋅m (177 lb⋅ft), equipped with a 64.4 kWh LFP battery, offering a CLTC range of 530 km (329 mi). Compared to the Leiting, the rear suspension has been upgraded from a torsion beam to a multi-link suspension.

Rear view
