= List of Dongfeng vehicles =

This is a list of current and former automobiles produced by Chinese automaker Dongfeng Motor (abbreviated as Dongfeng), under its brands of Aeolus, Dongfeng eπ, Dongfeng Nammi, Epicland, Forthing, M-Hero and Voyah.

== Current vehicles ==
=== M-Hero ===
| Image | Name(s) | Chinese name | Introduction (cal. year) | Generation | Vehicle description |
SUV
| | M817 | 猛士M817 | 2025 | First | Full-size SUV, PHEV |
| | X700 | 猛士X700 | 2026 | First | Mid-size SUV, PHEV/EREV |
| | 917 | 猛士917 | 2023 | First | Full-size SUV, PHEV/BEV |
ROV
| | M-Hunter | 猛士M-Hunter | 2024 | First | Full-size ROV |

=== Voyah ===
| Image | Name(s) | Chinese name | Introduction (cal. year) | Generation | Vehicle description |
Sedan
| | Passion Passion L | 岚图追光 岚图追光L | 2023 2025 | First | Full-size sedan, PHEV/BEV LWB upmarket variant of Passion |
SUV
| | Courage | 岚图知音 | 2024 | First | Compact SUV, BEV |
| | Free | 岚图FREE | 2021 | Second | Mid-size SUV, PHEV/BEV |
| | Passion S | 岚图追光S | 2026 | First | Mid-size coupe SUV, BEV |
| | Taishan Taishan X8 | 岚图泰山 岚图泰山X8 | 2025 2026 | First | Full-size SUV, PHEV 5-seat version of Taishan |
MPV
| | Dream Dream 9 | 岚图梦想家 岚图梦想家9 | 2022 2026 | First | Full-size MPV, PHEV/BEV |

=== Epicland ===
| Image | Name(s) | Chinese name | Introduction (cal. year) | Generation | Vehicle description |
SUV
| | X9 | 奕境X9 | 2026 | First | Full-size SUV, EREV/BEV |

=== eπ and Nammi ===
| Image | Name(s) | Chinese name | Introduction (cal. year) | Generation | Vehicle description |
Car
| | eπ 007 eπ EP7 | 奕派007 奕派EP7 | 2024 to commence | First | Mid-size sedan, BEV/PHEV Huawei Qiankun variant |
| | Nammi 01 | 纳米01 | 2024 | First | Subcompact hatchback, BEV |
SUV
| | eπ 008 eπ M8 | 奕派008 奕派M8 | 2024 2026 | First | Mid-size SUV, BEV/PHEV Huawei Qiankun variant |
| | Nammi 06 | 纳米06 | 2025 | First | Compact SUV, BEV |

=== Aeolus ===
| Image | Name(s) | Chinese name | Introduction (cal. year) | Generation | Vehicle description |
Sedan
| | E70 | 风神E70 | 2019 | First | Subcompact sedan, BEV variant of Aeolus A60 |
| | Yixuan | 风神奕炫 | 2019 | First | Compact sedan |
SUV
| | Haoji L8/L8+ | 风神皓极 风神L8/风神L8+ | 2022 2025 | First | Compact SUV PHEV variant |
| | Haohan L7/L8Y Sky EV01 | 风神皓瀚 风神L7/风神L8Y 风神Sky EV01 | 2023 2024 2023 | First | Compact SUV PHEV variant BEV variant |
| | Yixuan GS | 风神奕炫GS | 2020 | First | Compact SUV |

=== Forthing ===
| Image | Name(s) | Chinese name | Introduction (cal. year) | Generation | Vehicle description |
Sedan
| | S50 EV | 风行S50 EV | 2016 | First | Compact sedan, BEV variant of Forthing Jingyi S50 |
| | Xinghai S7 | 风行星海S7 | 2024 | First | Full-size sedan |
SUV
| | T5 EVO Leiting/Xinghai T5 | 风行T5 EVO 风行星海T5/雷霆 | 2021 2023 | First | Compact SUV BEV variant |
| | T5 | 风行T5 | 2018 | First | Compact SUV |
MPV
| | Lingzhi | 风行菱智 | 2001 | First | Mid-size MPV |
| | Lingzhi Plus | 风行菱智PLUS | 2021 | First | Full-size MPV |
| | Lingzhi M5 | 风行菱智M5 | 2018 | First | Full-size MPV |
| | Lingzhi M7 | 风行菱智M7 | 2019 | First | Full-size MPV |
| | Yacht Xinghai V6 | 风行游艇 风行星海V6 | 2022 2026 | First | Mid-size MPV PHEV variant |
| | Xinghai V9 | 风行星海V9 | 2024 | First | Full-size MPV |

== Discontinued vehicles ==
=== Aeolus ===
| Image | Name | Chinese name | Introduction (cal. year) | Discontinued | Generation | Vehicle description |
Car
| | EX1 | 风神EX1 | 2020 | 2021 | First | City car, rebadged Dongfeng Nammi EX |
| | E30/E30L | 风神E30 | 2015 | 2016 | First | City car |
| | A30 | 风神A30 | 2014 | 2019 | First | Compact sedan |
| | A60 | 风神A60 | 2011 | 2018 | First | Subcompact sedan |
| | S30 H30 | 风神S30 风神H30 | 2009 | 2017 | First | Compact sedan Hatchback variant |
| | L60 | 风神L60 | 2015 | 2019 | First | Mid-size sedan |
| | Yixuan Max | 风神奕炫MAX | 2021 | 2025 | First | Mid-size sedan |
| | A9 | 东风A9 | 2016 | 2019 | First | Executive sedan |
SUV
| | AX3 | 风神AX3 | 2015 | 2019 | First | Subcompact SUV |
| | AX4 | 风神AX4 | 2017 | 2021 | First | Subcompact SUV |
| | AX5 | 风神AX5 | 2016 | 2020 | First | Compact SUV |
| | AX7 | 风神AX7 | 2014 | 2025 | Second | Compact SUV |

=== Nammi ===
| Image | Name(s) | Chinese name | Introduction (cal. year) | Discontinued | Generation | Vehicle description |
Hatchback
| | Nano EX1 | 纳米EX1 | 2020 | 2024 | First | Subcompact hatchback, BEV |
| | Nano Box | 纳米Box | 2022 | 2024 | First | Subcompact hatchback, BEV |

=== Forthing ===
| Image | Name | Chinese name | Introduction (cal. year) | Discontinued | Generation | Vehicle description |
Car
| | Jingyi S50 | 景逸S50 | 2014 | 2023 | First | Compact Sedan |
| | S60 EV | 风行S60 EV | 2021 | 2024 | First | Compact sedan, BEV variant of Forthing Jingyi S50 |
SUV
| | Jingyi X3 | 景逸X3 | 2014 | 2019 | First | Subcompact SUV |
| | Jingyi X5 | 景逸X5 | 2013 | 2021 | First | Compact SUV |
| | Jingyi X6 | 景逸X6 | 2016 | 2017 | First | Mid-size SUV |
| | SX6 | 风行SX6 | 2016 | 2023 | First | Mid-size SUV |
| | T5L | 风行T5L | 2019 | 2021 | First | Mid-size SUV |
MPV
| | CM7 | 风行CM7 | 2014 | 2018 | First | Full-size MPV |
| | F600 | 风行F600 | 2016 | 2019 | First | Full-size MPV |
| | Jingyi Jingyi SUV | 景逸 景逸SUV | 2007 2012 | 2015 2013 | First | Compact SUV SUV variant |
| | M6 | 风行M6 | 2019 | 2020 | First | Full-size MPV |
| | S500 | 风行S500 | 2016 | 2017 | First | Minivan |
