= Yixuan =

Yixuan may refer to:

== People ==
- Yixuan, Prince Chun (1840–1891), a Manchu prince and statesman of the late Qing Dynasty
- An Yixuan (born 1980), Taiwanese actress
- Duan Yixuan (born 1995), Chinese singer and actress
- Hu Yixuan (swimmer) (born 1994), Chinese swimmer
- Li Yixuan (born 1997), Chinese tennis player
- Linji Yixuan (died 866), Chinese Buddhist teacher
- Zhou Yixuan (born 1990), Chinese rapper, singer, and actor

== Automobiles ==
- Aeolus Yixuan, a 2019–present Chinese compact sedan
  - Aeolus Yixuan GS, a 2020–present Chinese compact crossover
  - Aeolus Yixuan Max, a 2021–present Chinese mid-size sedan

== Other ==
- Yixuan, a character in the 2024 game Zenless Zone Zero
