= E30 =

E30 may refer to:

== Automobiles ==
- Fengshen E30, a 2016–present Chinese electric city car
- Venucia e30, two different Chinese electric cars
- Zotye E30, a 2016–present Chinese electric city car
- BMW 3 Series (E30), a 1982–1994 German compact executive car
- Toyota Corolla (E30), a 1974–1981 Japanese compact car

== Roads ==
- E 30 road (United Arab Emirates)
- European route E30
- New North Klang Straits Bypass, route E30 in Malaysia
- Seto-Chūō Expressway, route E30 in Japan

== Other uses ==
- Nimzo-Indian Defense, Encyclopaedia of Chess Openings code
- HMS E30, a British submarine
- Bruce Field which has the FAA LID E30
