= AX4 =

AX4 or AX-4 may refer to:

- Aeolus AX4, compact crossover SUV
- Axiom Mission 4, a 2025 private space mission to the ISS with astronauts from the space agencies of India, Hungary, and Poland/ESA
- AX-4: Black Hole, a 1982 videogame; see List of Project EGG games
- Aisin AX4 transmission; see List of Aisin transmissions
- Clariion AX4, a storage area network server

== See also ==
- AX (disambiguation)
