= Aeolus (marque) =

Chinese automobile company

- Product type: Automobile brand
- Current owner: Dongfeng Motor Group
- Country: China
- Introduced: July 2009
- Markets: China; South America; Algeria
- Ambassador: Wang Feng (Chairman)
- Website: dfpv.com.cn

Chinese name
- Simplified Chinese: 东风风神
- Traditional Chinese: 東風風神
- Literal meaning: Easterly wind, wind god
Transcriptions
Standard Mandarin
- Hanyu Pinyin: Dōngfēng Fēngshén

Aeolus (Dongfeng Fengshen) is an automobile brand owned by the Chinese automaker eπ Technology, a division of Dongfeng Motor Group. The brand was launched in July 2009 using the Fengshen name, and was later renamed Aeolus as the English name, while the Chinese name remained the same (Chinese: 风神; pinyin: Fēngshén).

Logo of Aeolus until 2024

Some of its products are based on those of PSA Peugeot Citroën, such as Fengshen L60, launched by Dongfeng Peugeot-Citroën in 2015.

== History ==
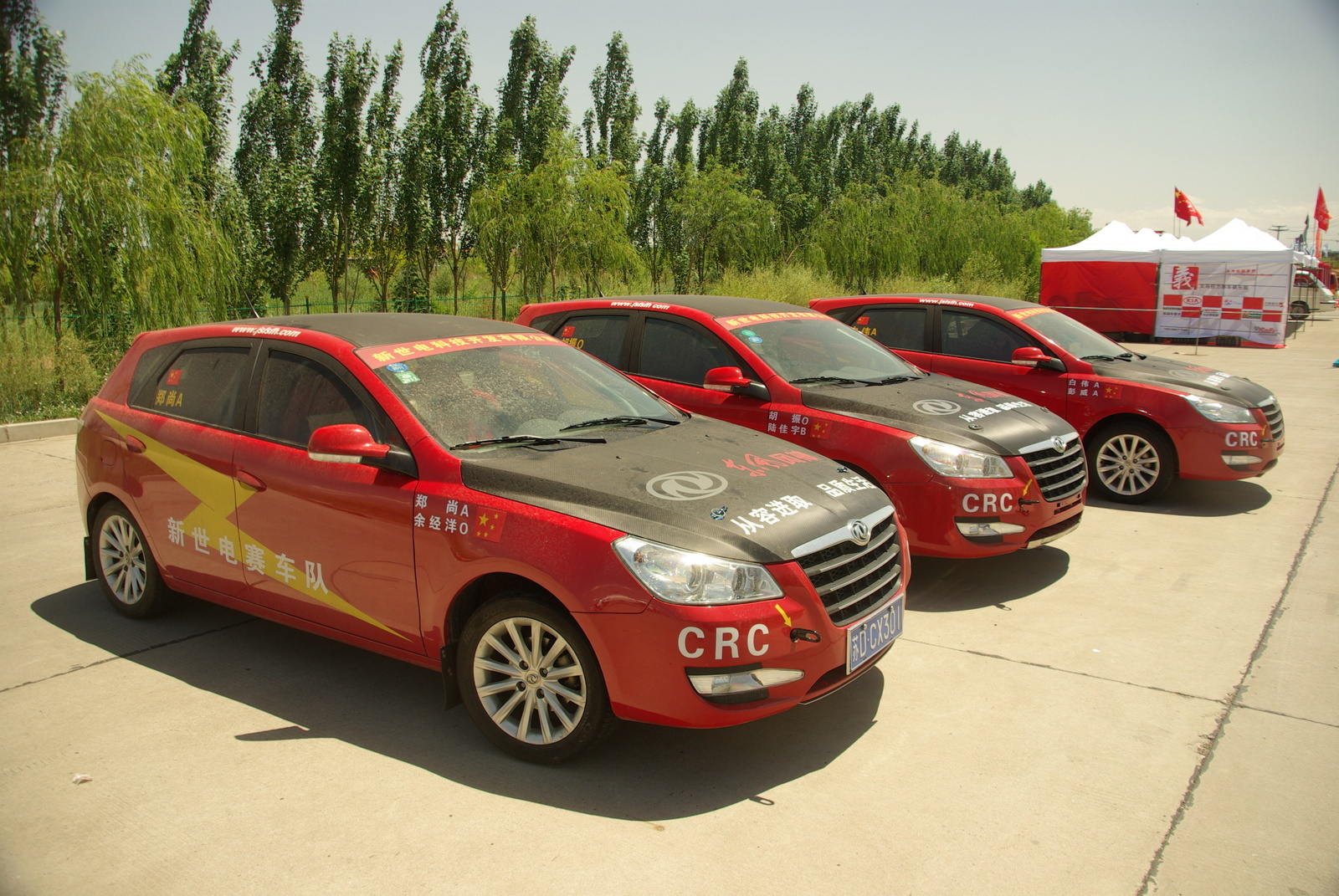
Dongfeng Fengshen H30 as racing cars

The Fengshen name was first used as a vehicle model name by Yunbao Automobile, a joint-venture set up by the Taiwanese Yulon Motor. During the late 1990s, Nissan of Japan was formally added as a partner in the Yunbao joint-venture which resulted in the first Fengshen, the Yunbao Fengshen 7200, a rebadged model line based on the Nissan Bluebird U13 that was launched in the Chinese market in 1998. Later in 2003, Nissan bought Yulon's share in the joint-venture which became Dongfeng-Nissan, and later the Fengshen name was chosen to become the name of the new sub-brand.

The first Fengshen production model, an A-class four-door sedan called the Fengshen S30, was unveiled at the Auto Shanghai motor show in April 2009 and went on sale in China in July 2009.

The logo of Dongfeng Fengshen before 2020

In June 2010, Dongfeng began the construction of an engine plant in Hebei province for the manufacture of self-developed engines for Fengshen vehicles.

The Fengshen H30, a mid-sized five-door hatchback, was officially launched in January 2011. The Fengshen H30 Cross, a compact five-door SUV, made its debut at the Auto Shanghai motor show in April 2011 and went on sale in China in the same month. The Fengshen A60, a compact sedan based on the Nissan Sylphy, made its debut at the Auto Guangzhou motor show in November 2011 and went on sale in China in March 2012.

In April 2012, Dongfeng announced that it would establish a multi-brand dealership network across China selling Fengshen, Dongfeng Fengxing and Zhengzhou Nissan vehicles.

Fengshen vehicles went on sale outside China for the first time in August 2012, when the brand was launched in Venezuela.

In August 2023, Dongfeng motor announced the restructuring of its subsidiary brands Aeolus (Dongfeng Fengshen), Dongfeng Nammi and Dongfeng eπ. The three brands were consolidated into one "Dongfeng" brand, which unified in marketing and production management. The three brands became sub-brands and remained using independent brands.

== Products ==
=== Current models ===
- Aeolus Yixuan (2019–present), compact sedan
  - Aeolus Yixuan GS (2020–present), SUV variant of Yixuan
- Aeolus A60 EV/ E70 (2015–present), EV variant of A60
- Aeolus E80 (2026–present), rebadged BEV eπ 007
- Aeolus Haohan (2023–present), compact SUV
  - Aeolus Sky EV01 (2023–present), EV variant of Haohan
  - Aeolus L7 (2024–present), PHEV variant of Haohan
  - Aeolus L8Y (2026–present), compact SUV
- Aeolus Haoji (2022–present), mid-size SUV
  - Aeolus L8 (2025–present), PHEV variant of Haoji
  - Aeolus L8+ (To be commenced), compact SUV
- Aeolus L9 (To be commenced), mid-size SUV
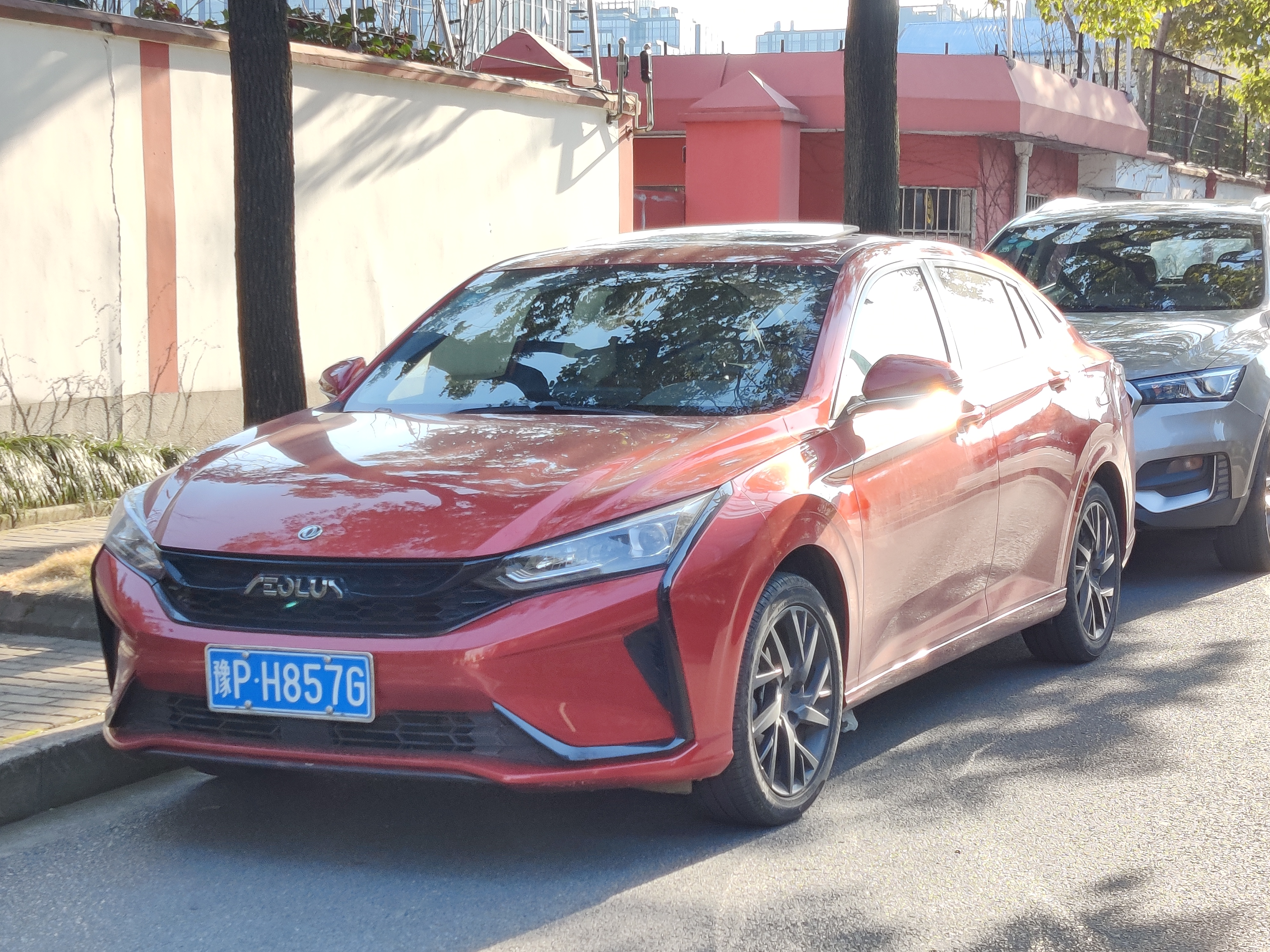
Aeolus Yixuan

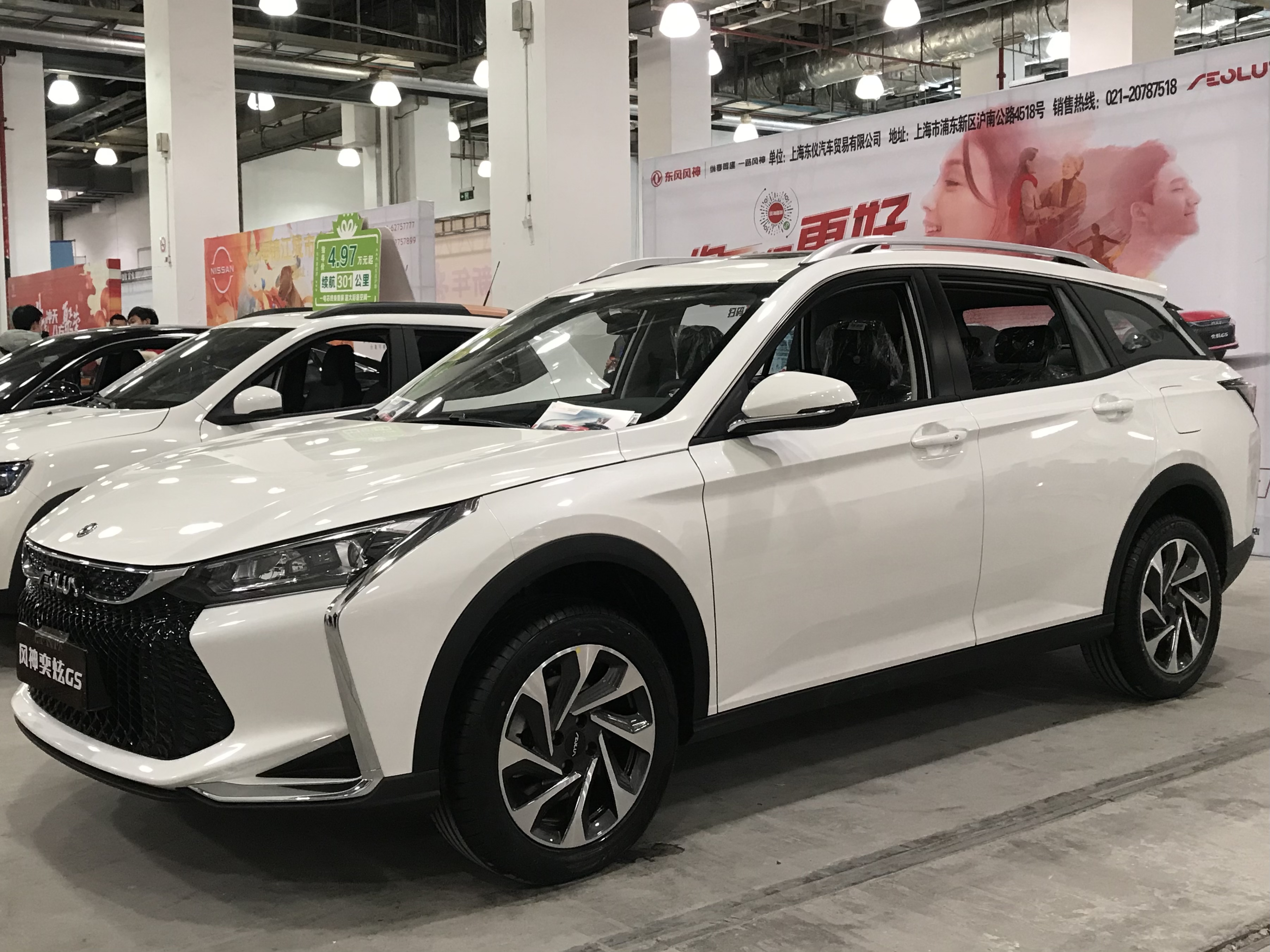
Aeolus Yixuan GS

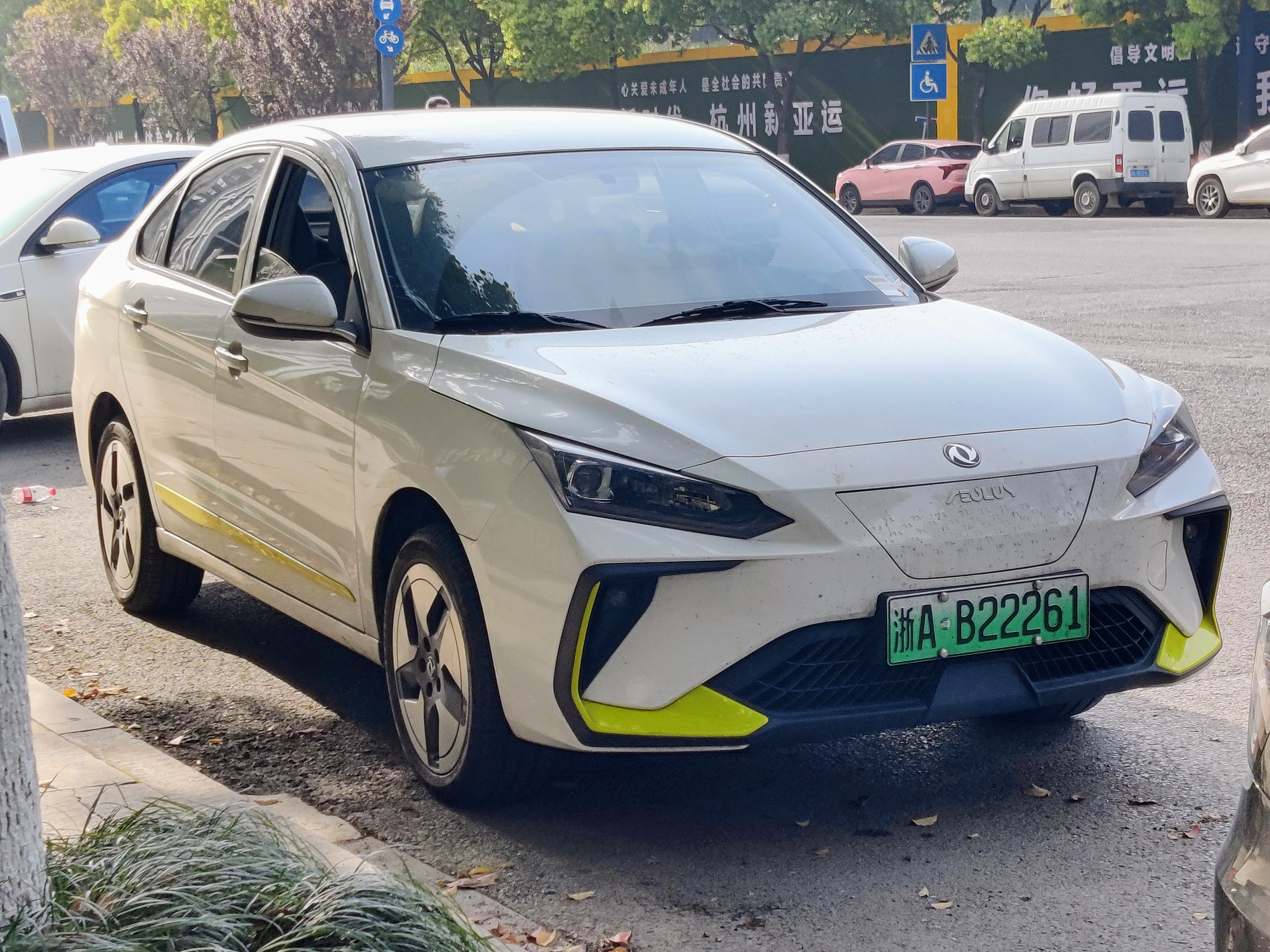
Aeolus E70

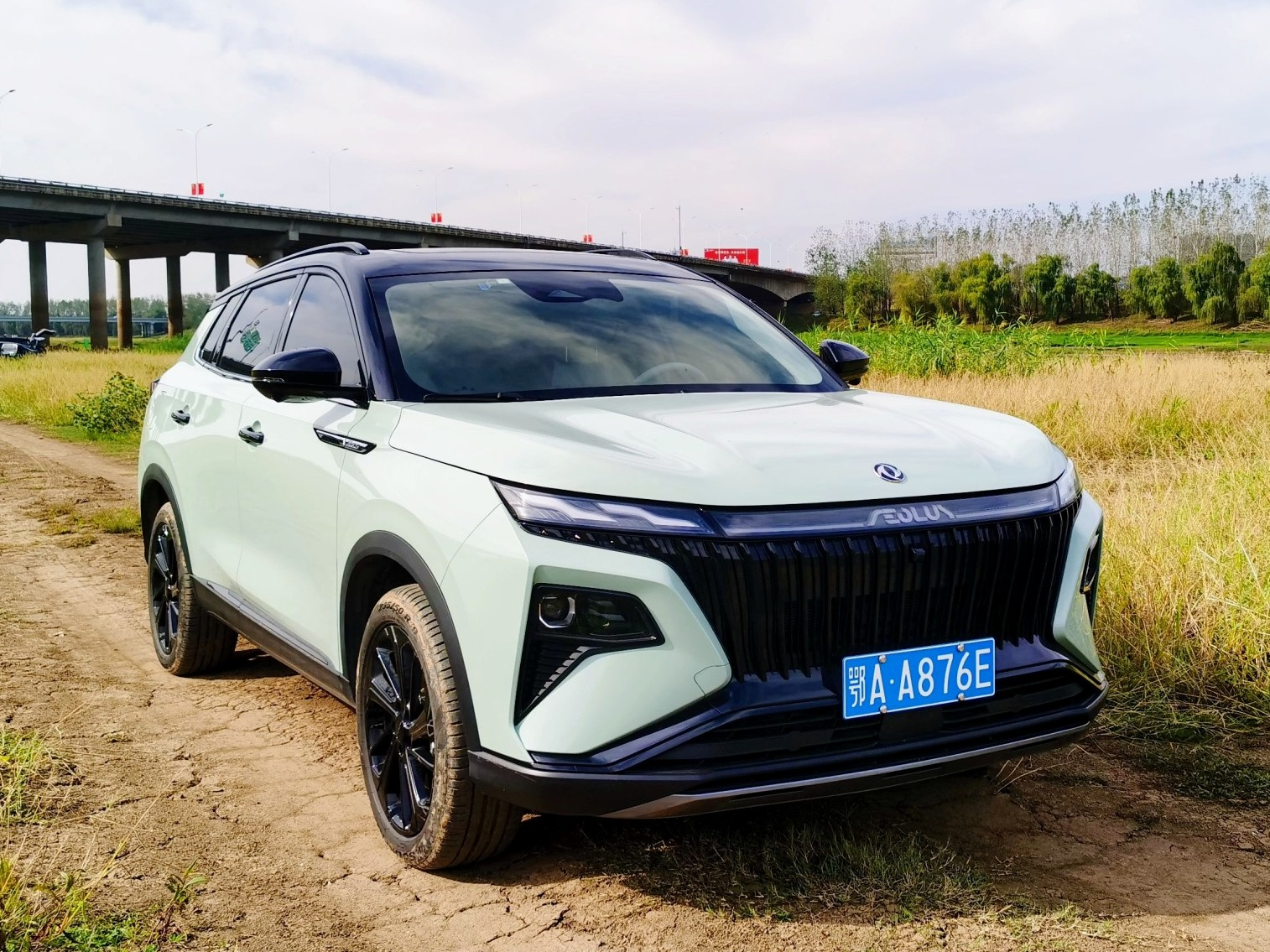
Aeolus Haoji

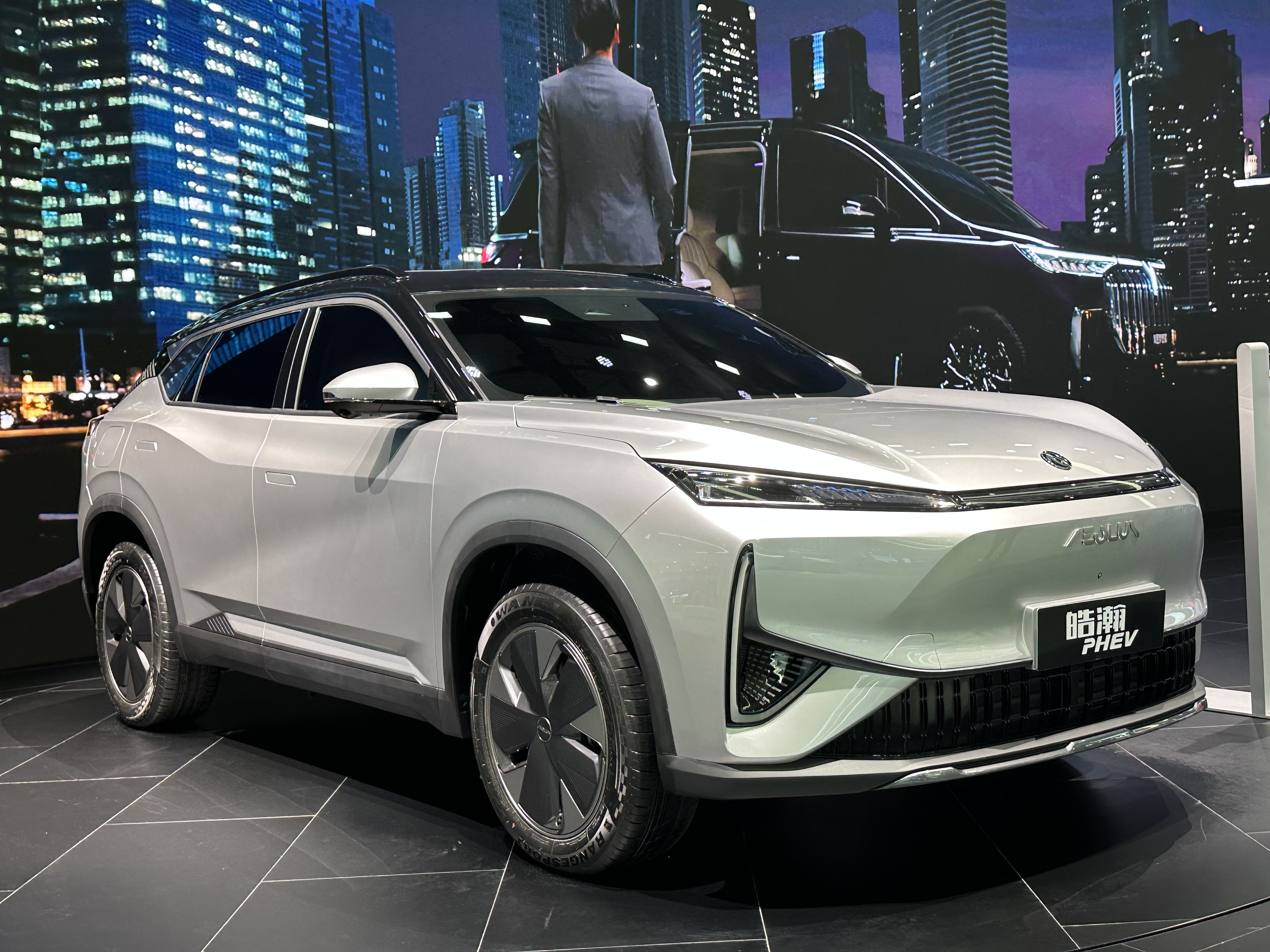
Aeolus Haohan

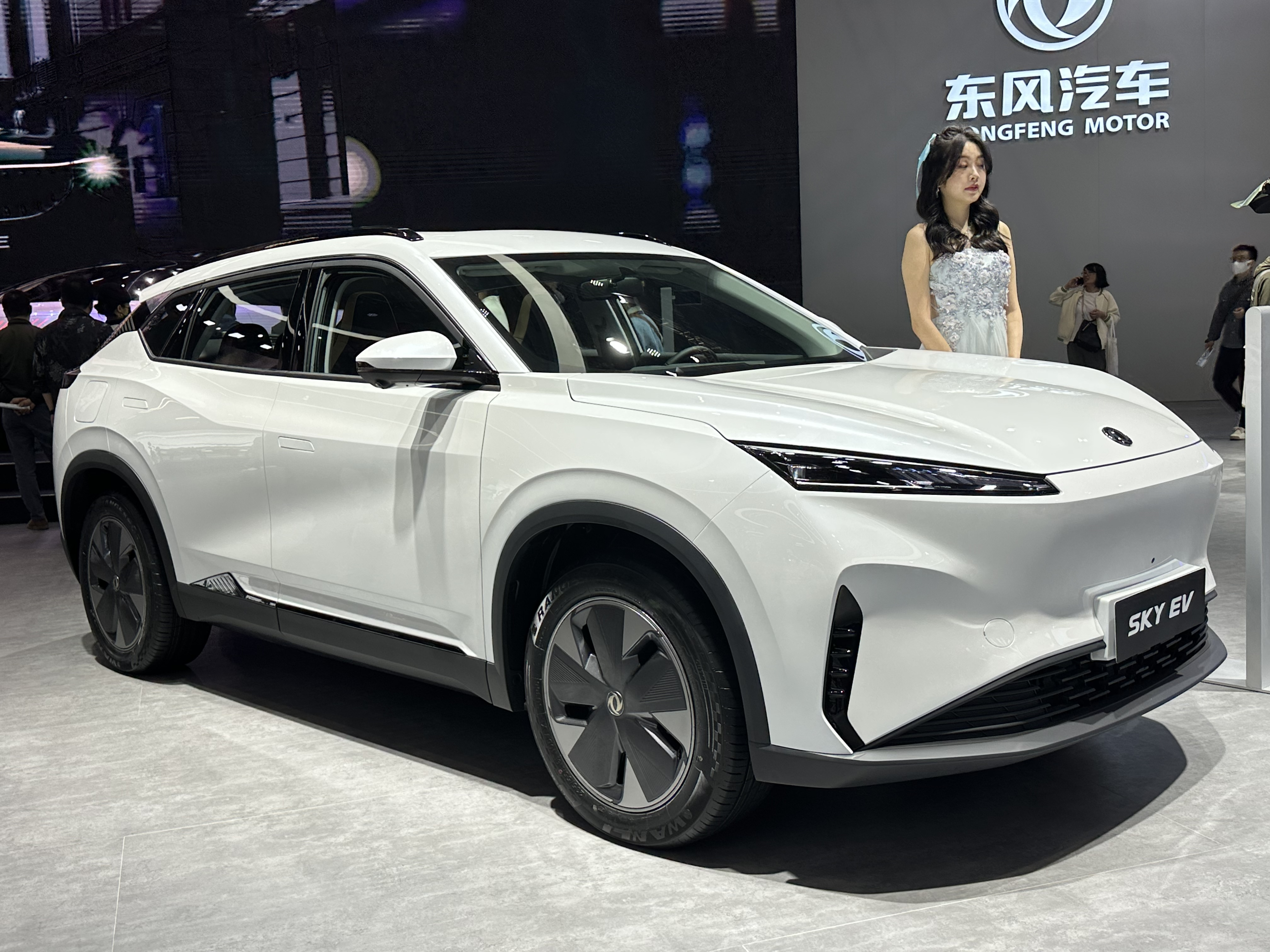
Aeolus Sky EV01

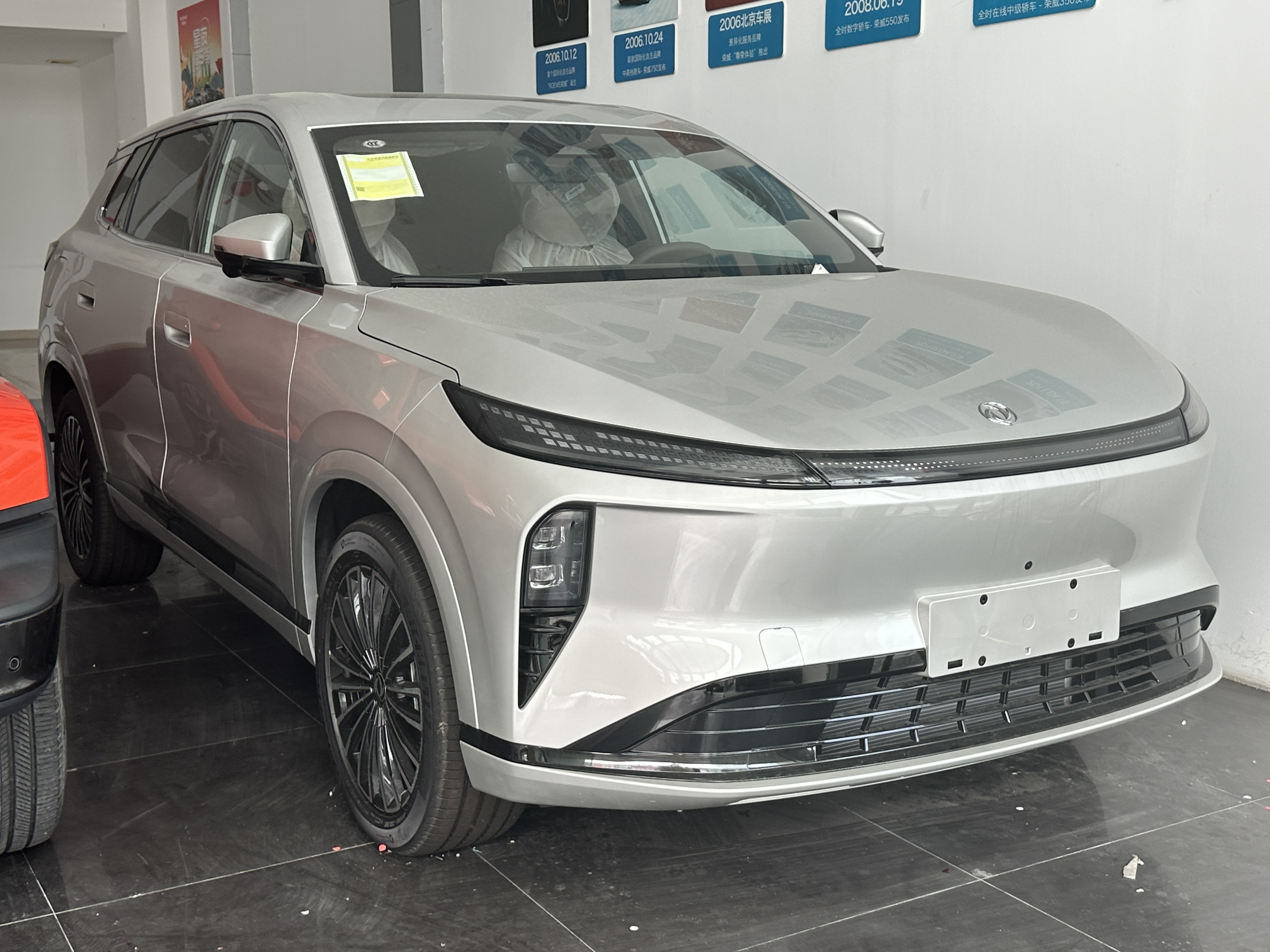
Aeolus L8

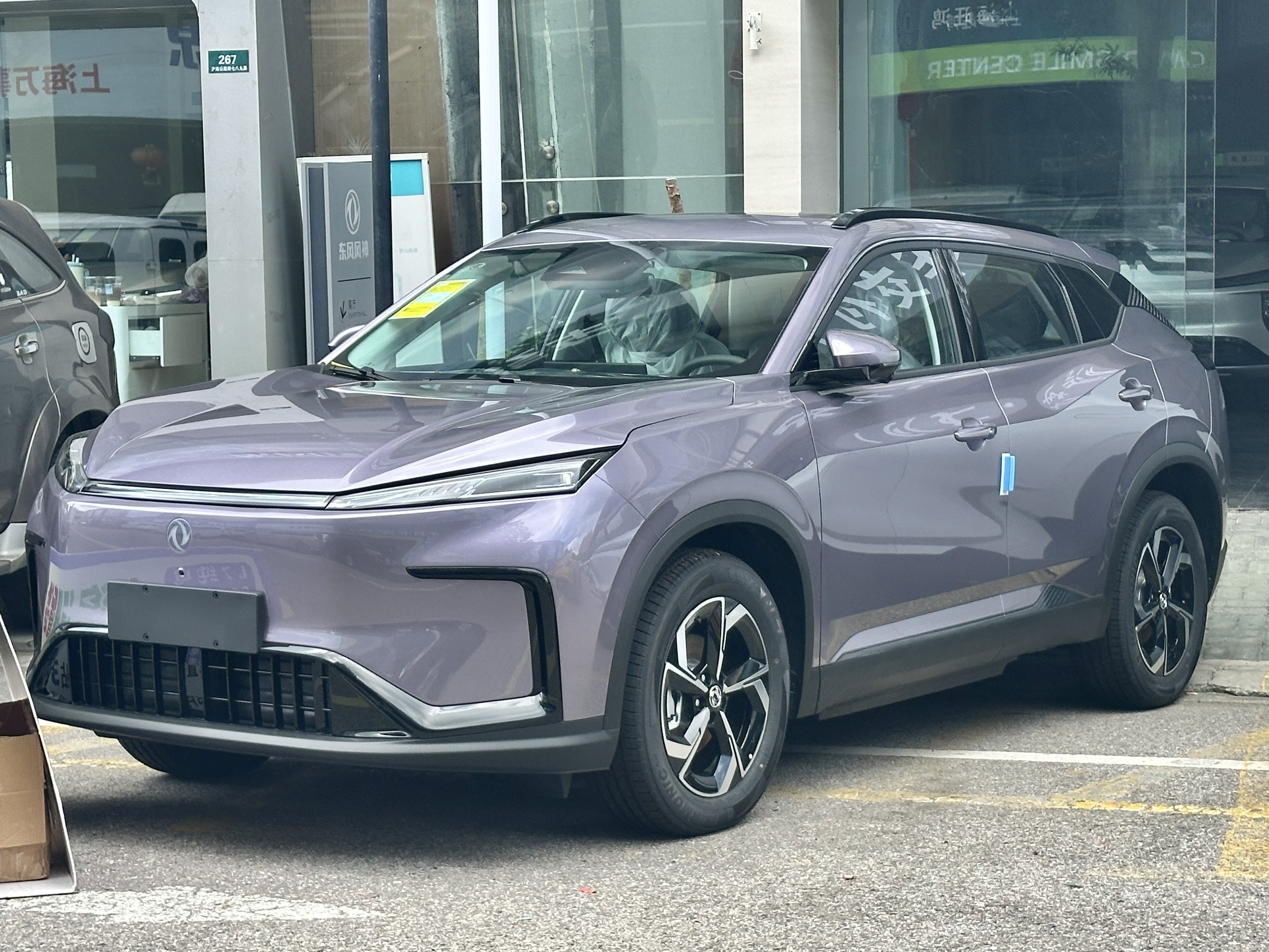
Aeolus L8Y

=== Discontinued models ===
==== Car ====
- Aeolus E30/E30L (2015–2016), city car
- Aeolus EX1 (2020–2022), city car
- Aeolus S30 (2009–2017), compact sedan
  - Aeolus H30 (2009–2017), hatchback variant of S30
  - Aeolus H30 Cross (2011–2017), SUV variant of S30
- Aeolus A30 (2014–2019), compact sedan
- Aeolus A60 (2011–2018), subcompact sedan
- Aeolus L60 (2015–2019), compact sedan
- Aeolus Yixuan Max (2021–2025), mid-size sedan
- Dongfeng A9 (2016–2019), full-size sedan
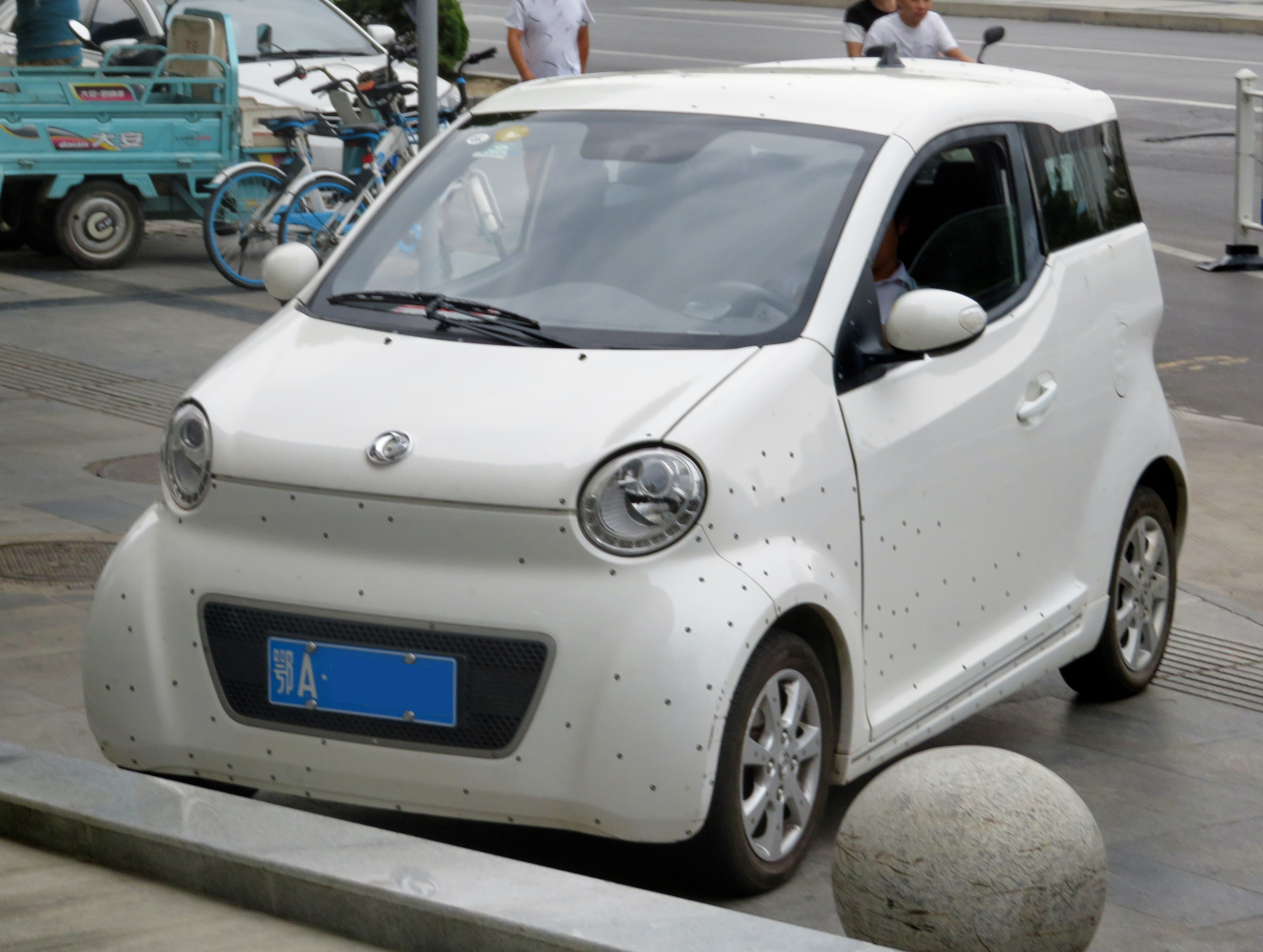
Aeolus E30

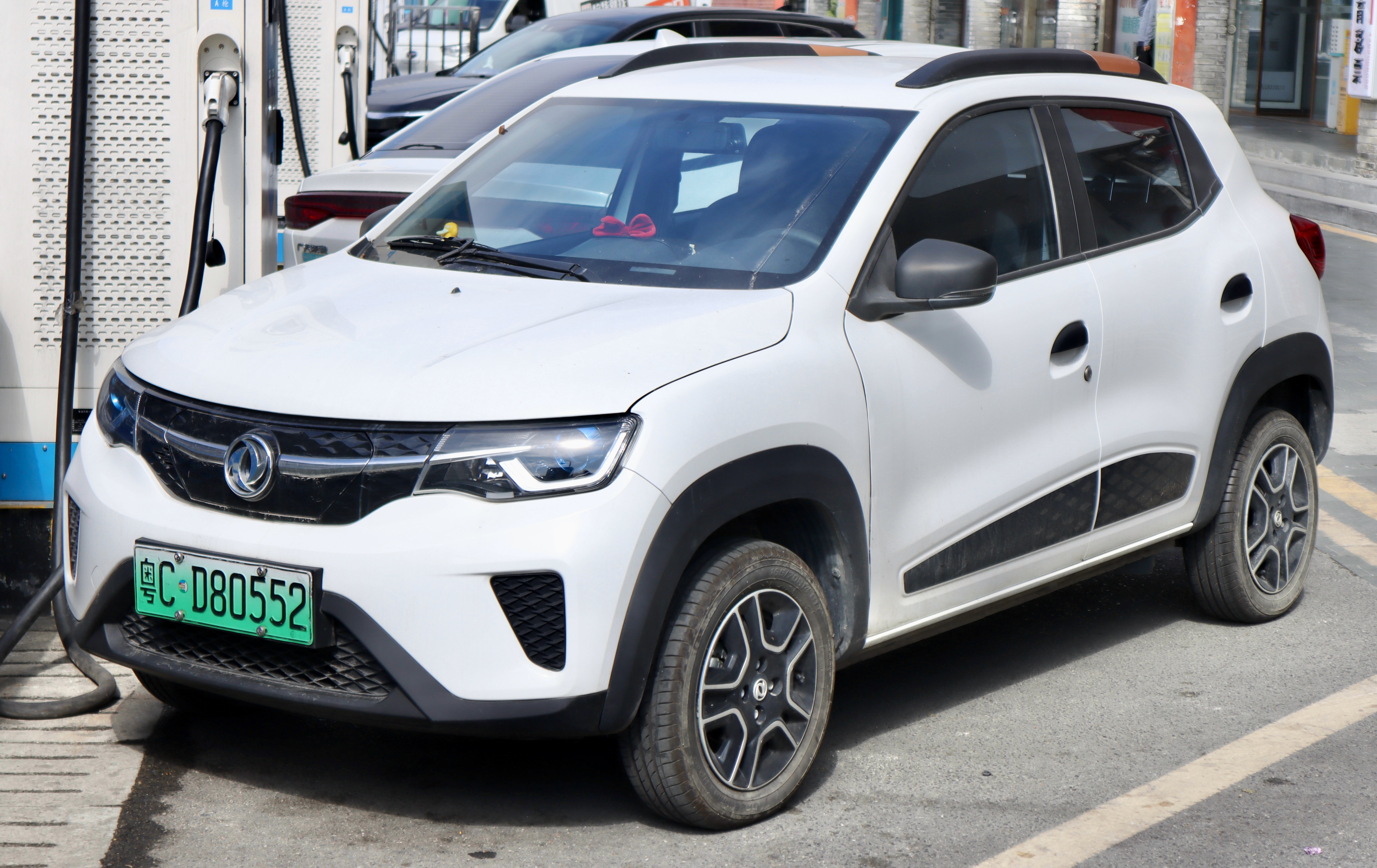
Aeolus EX1

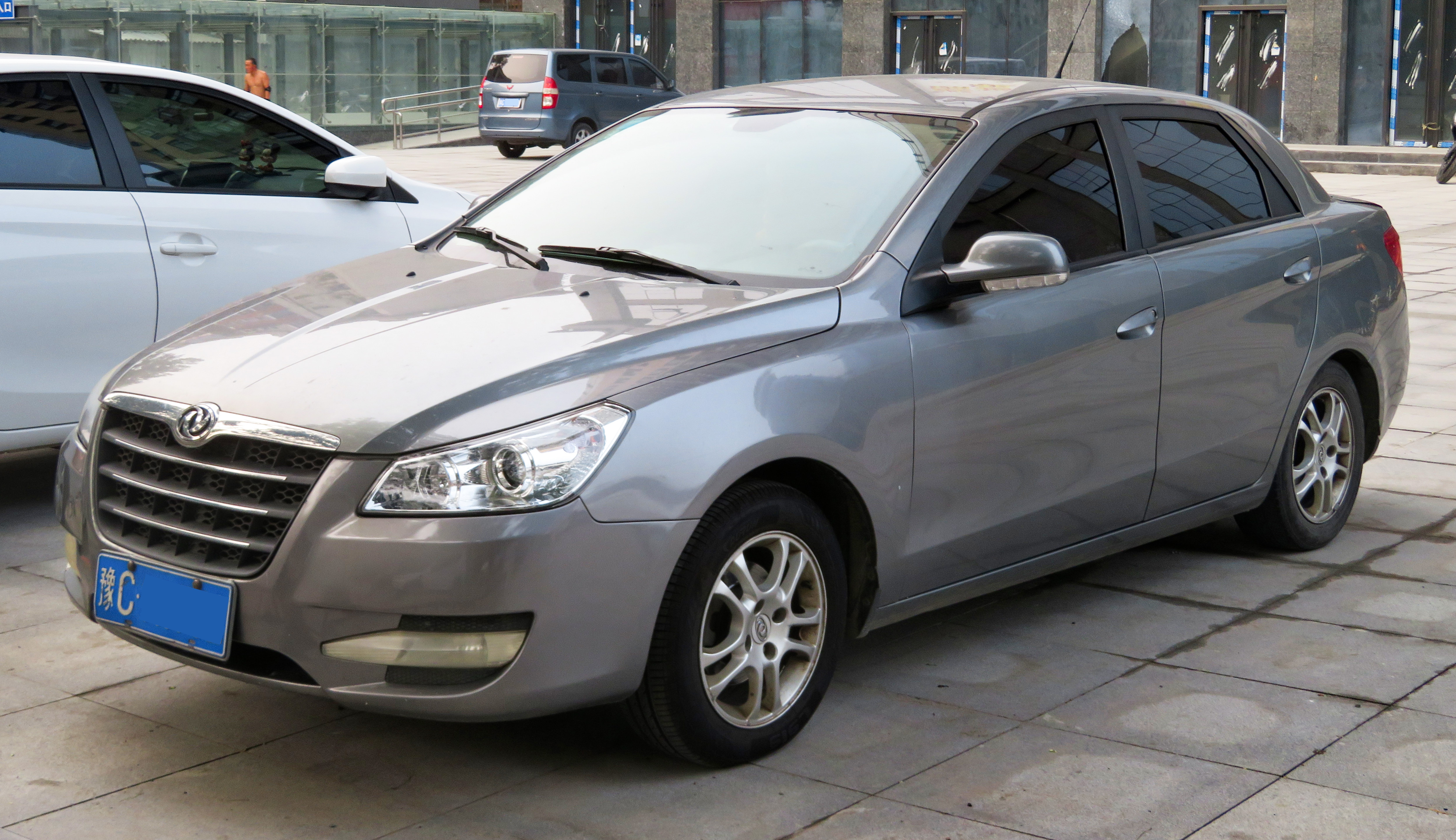
Aeolus S30

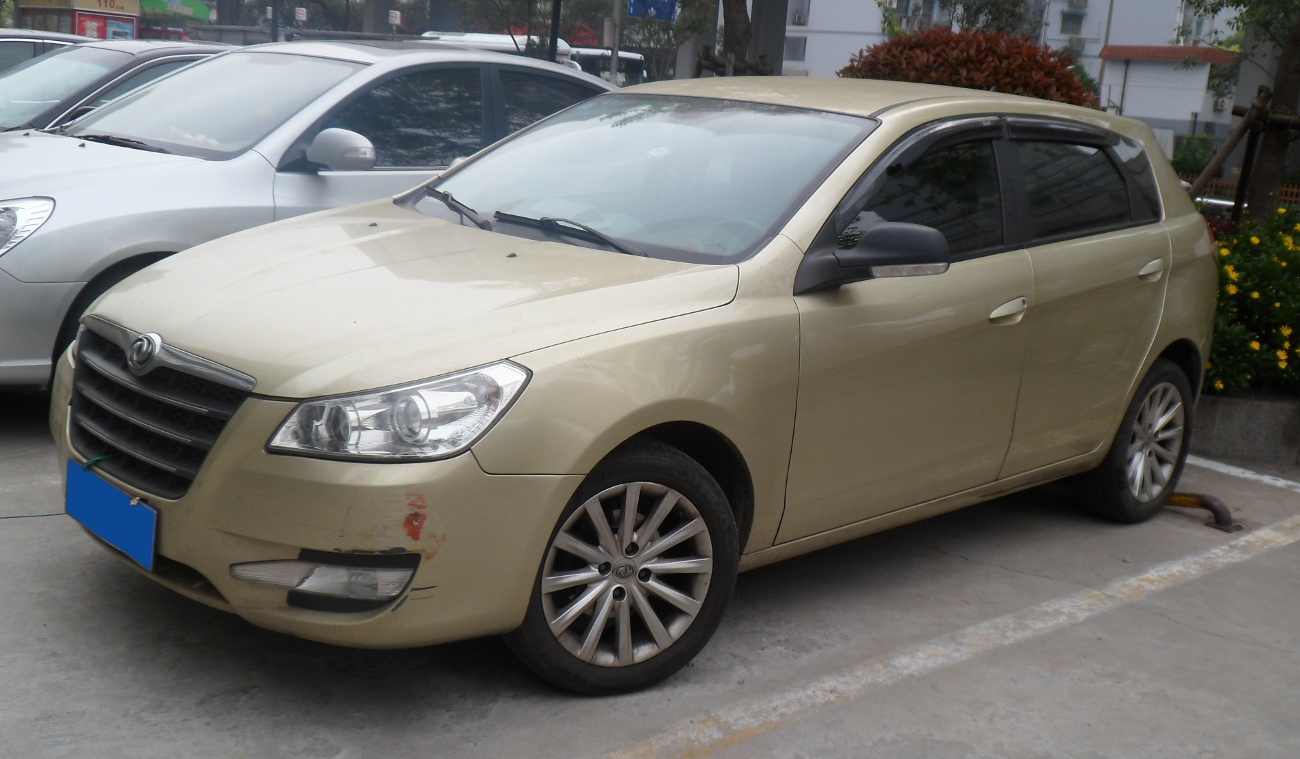
Aeolus H30

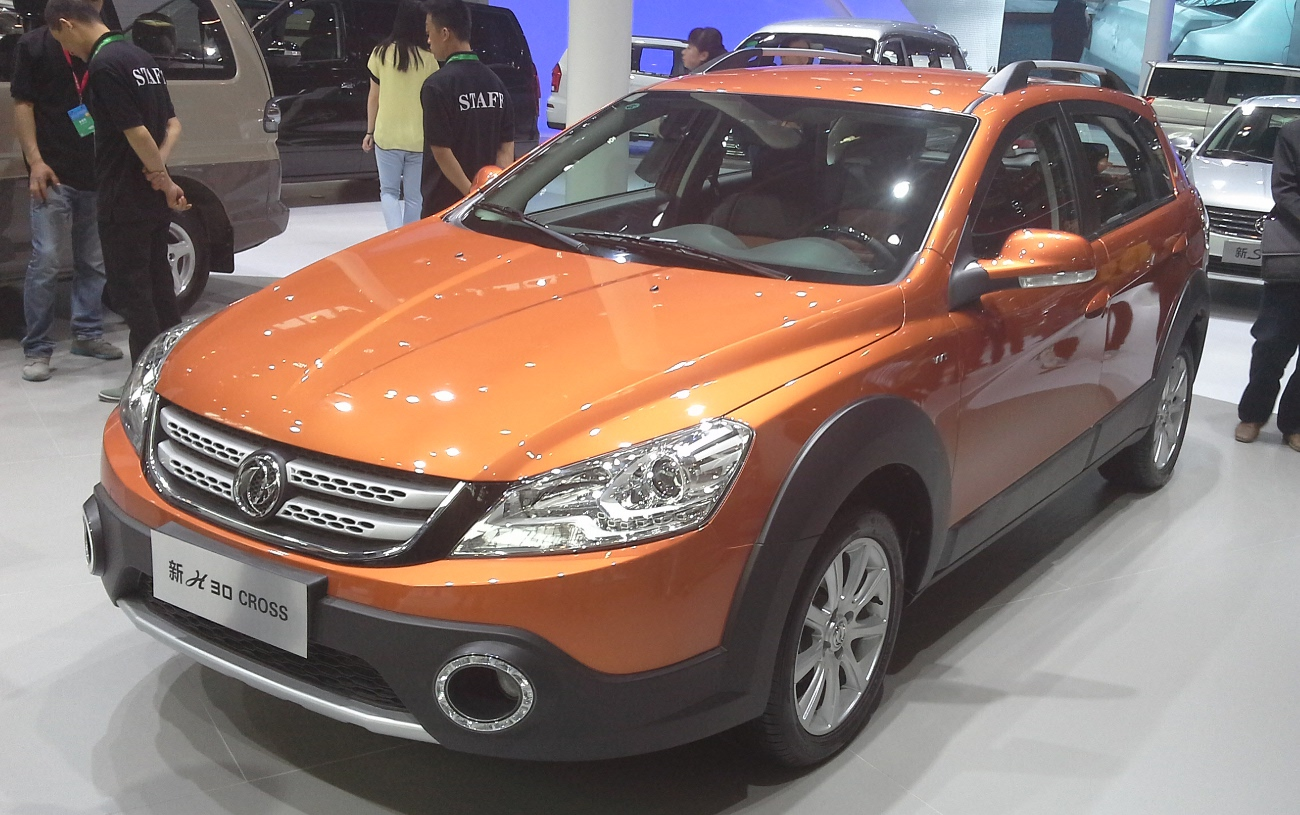
Aeolus H30 Cross

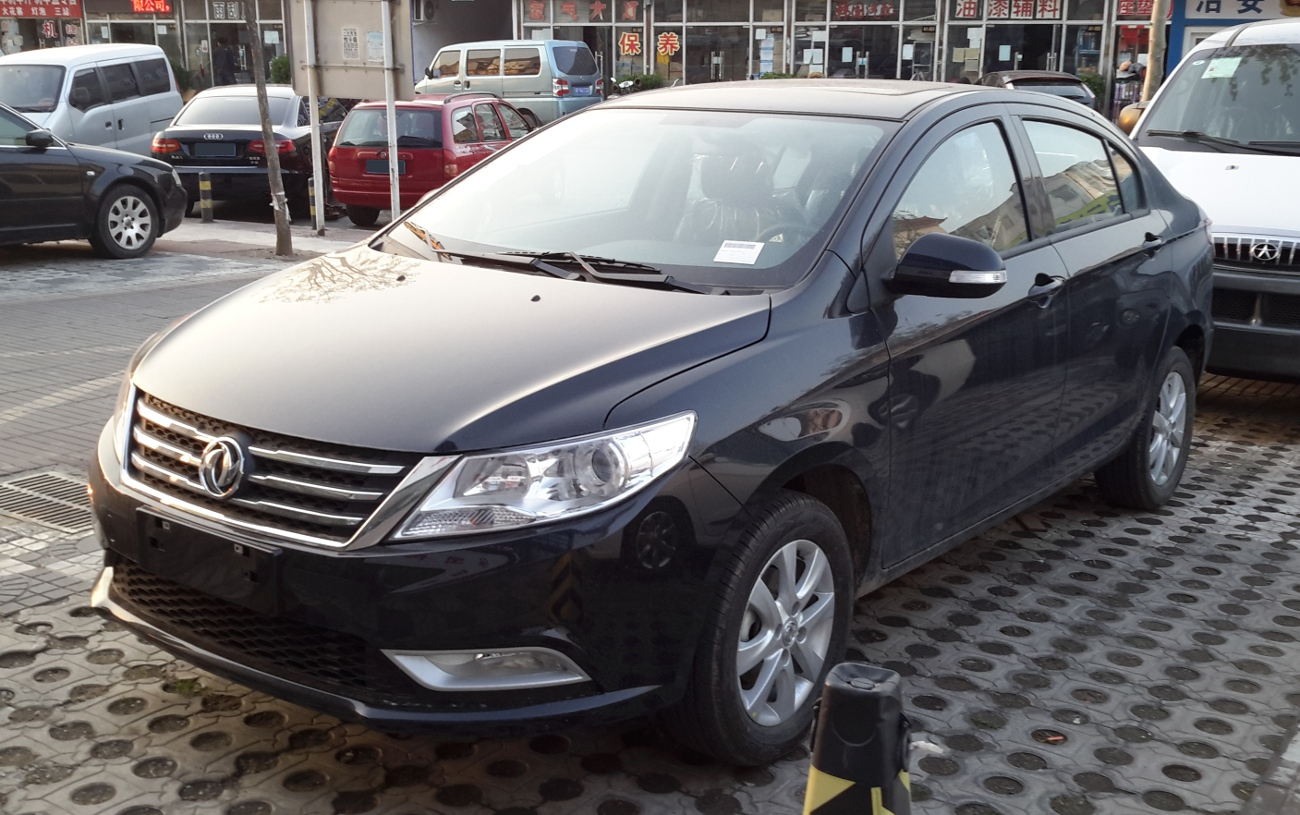
Aeolus A30

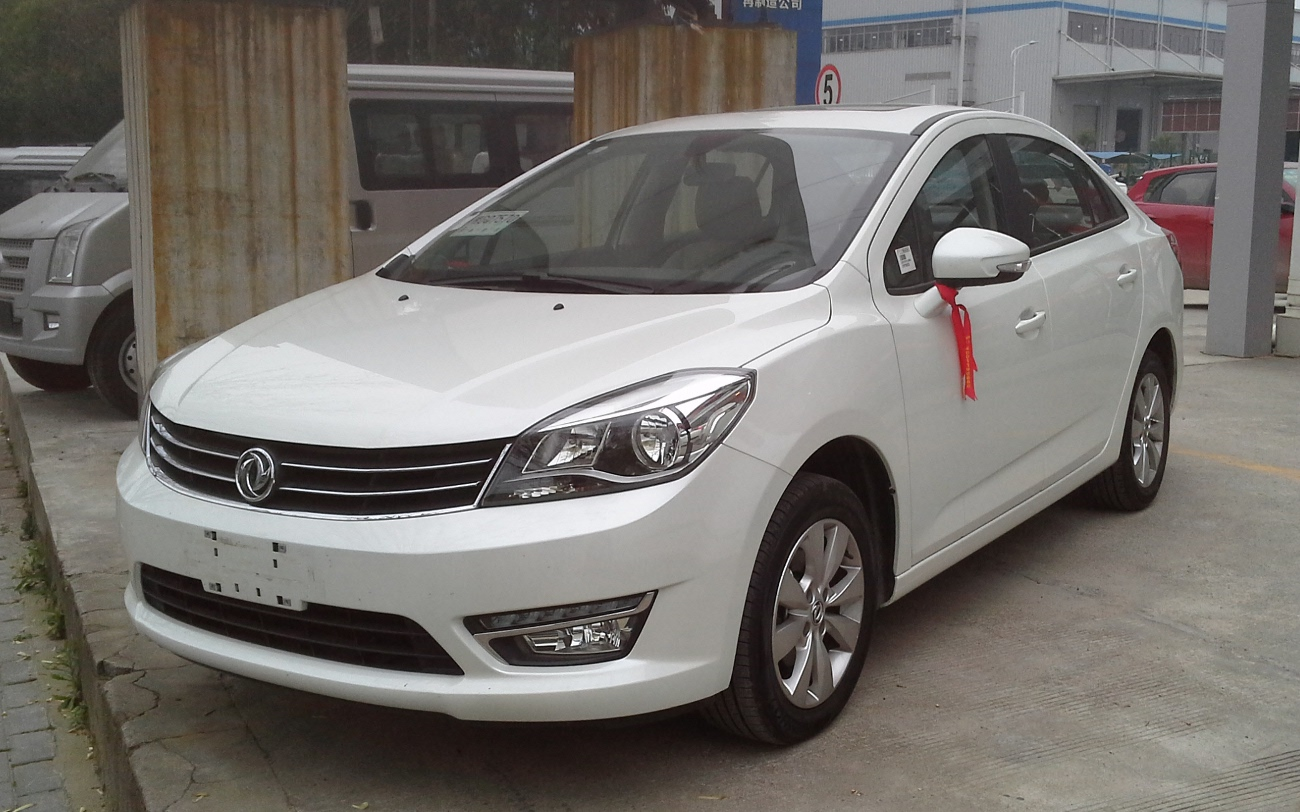
Aeolus L60

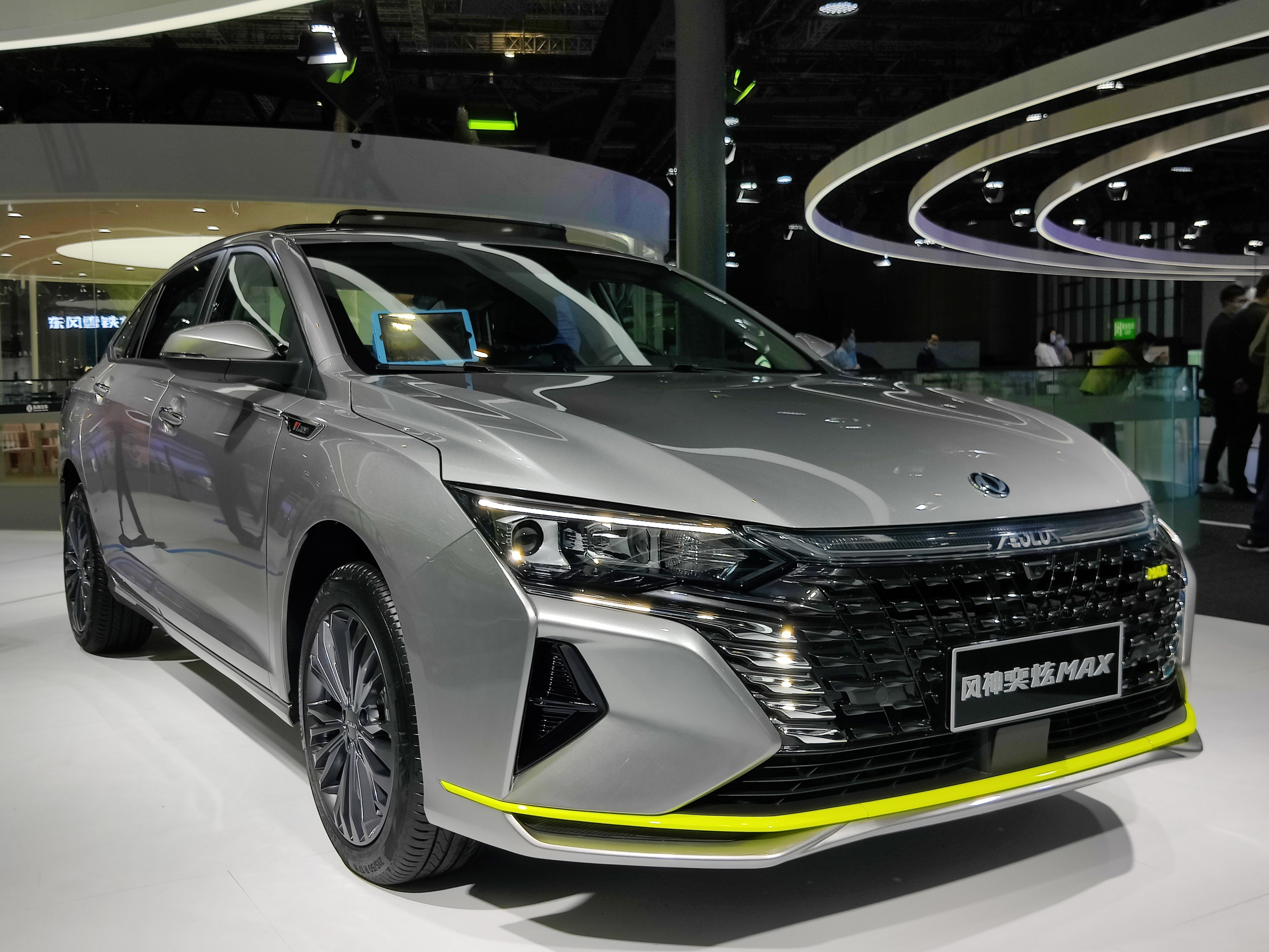
Aeolus Yixuan Max

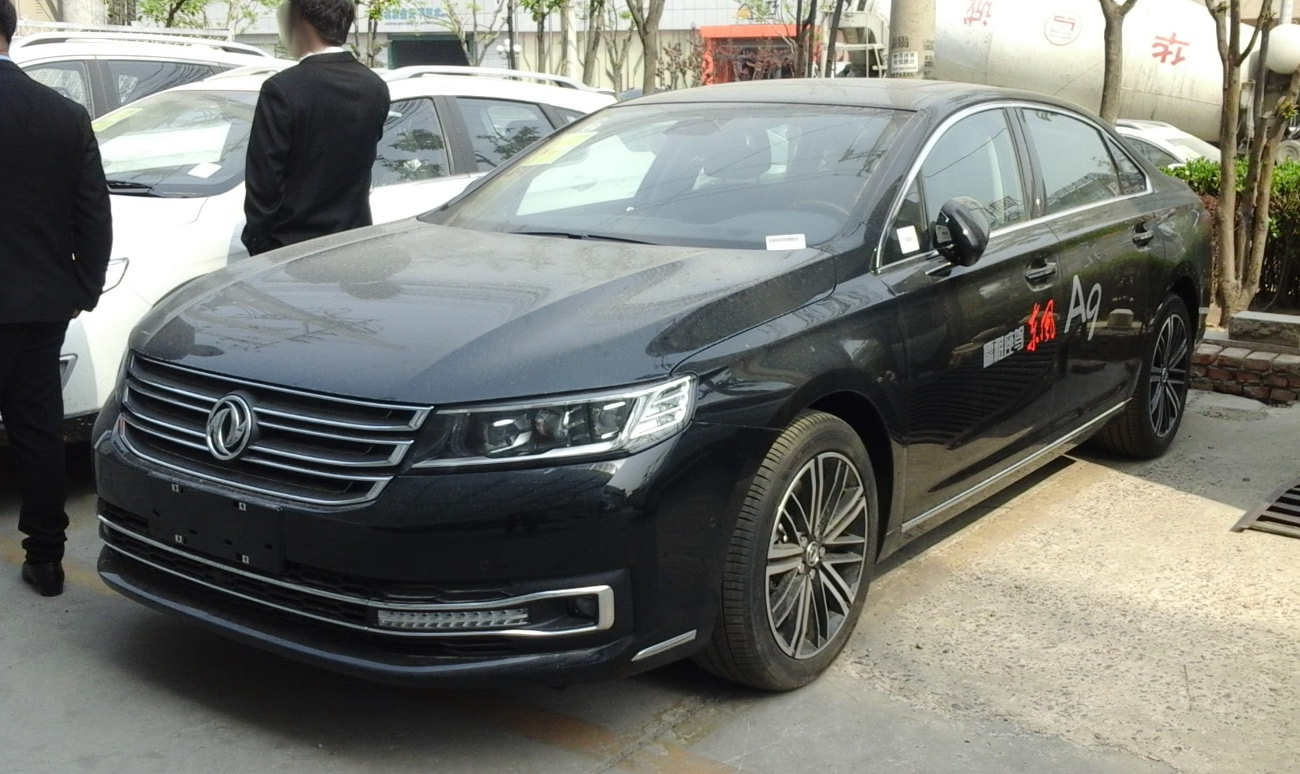
Dongfeng A9

==== SUV ====
- Aeolus AX3 (2015–2019), subcompact SUV
- Aeolus AX4 (2017–2021), subcompact SUV
- Aeolus AX5 (2016–2020), compact SUV
- Aeolus AX7 (2014–2025), compact SUV
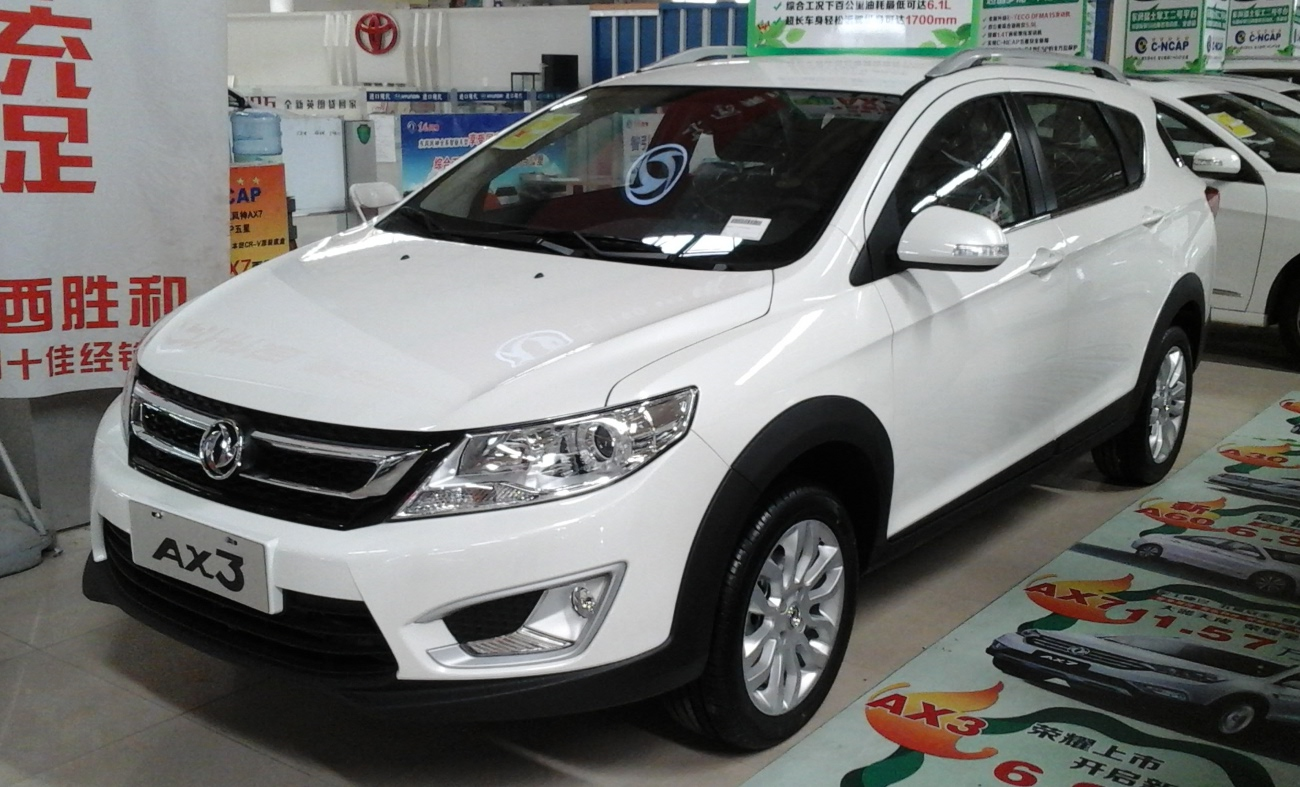
Aeolus AX3

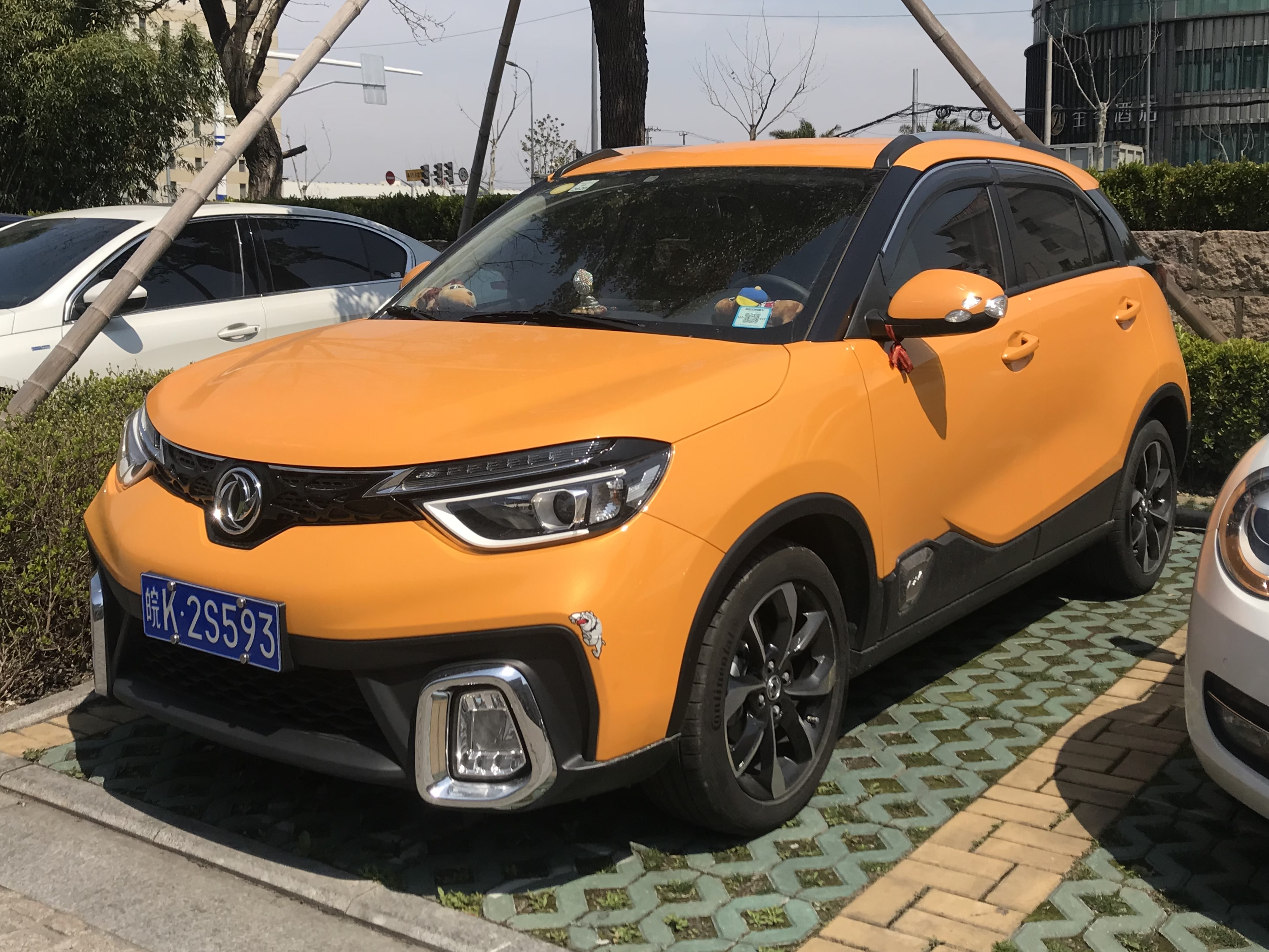
Aeolus AX4

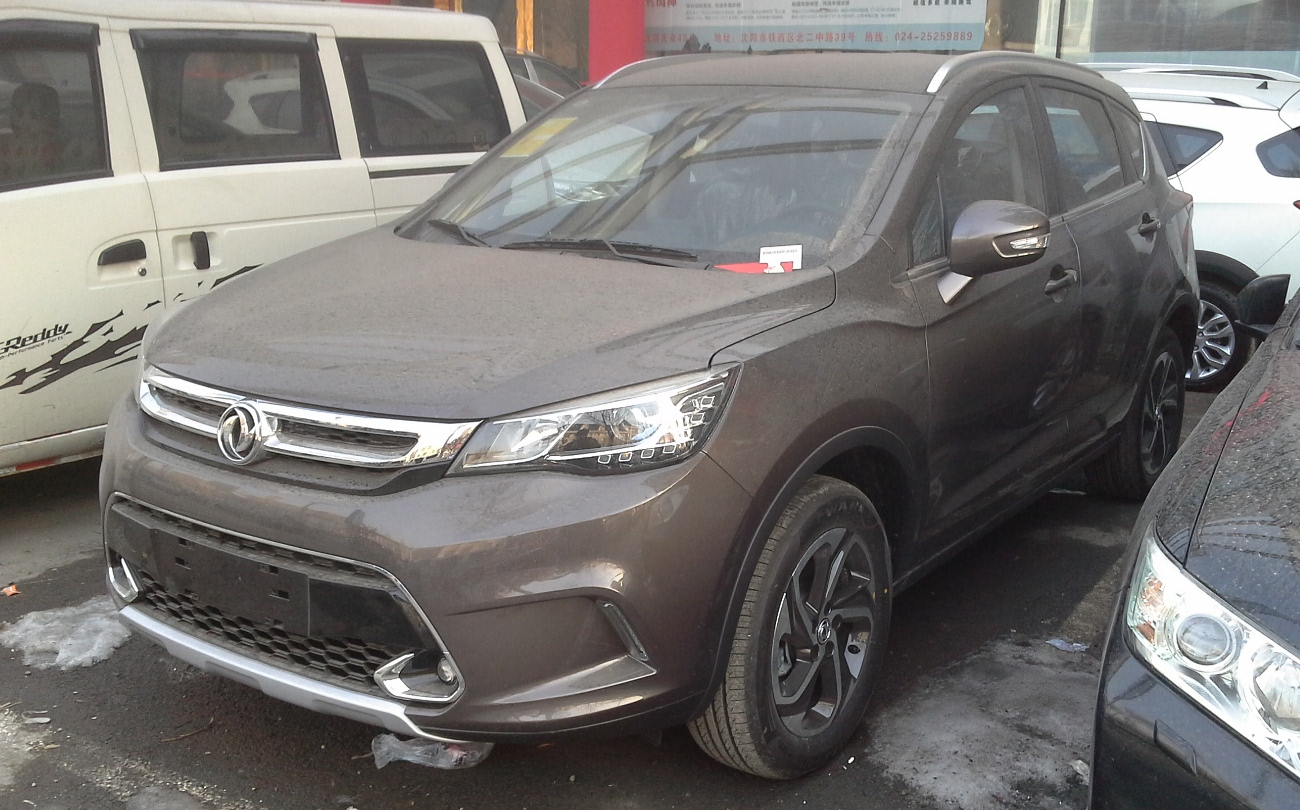
Aeolus AX5

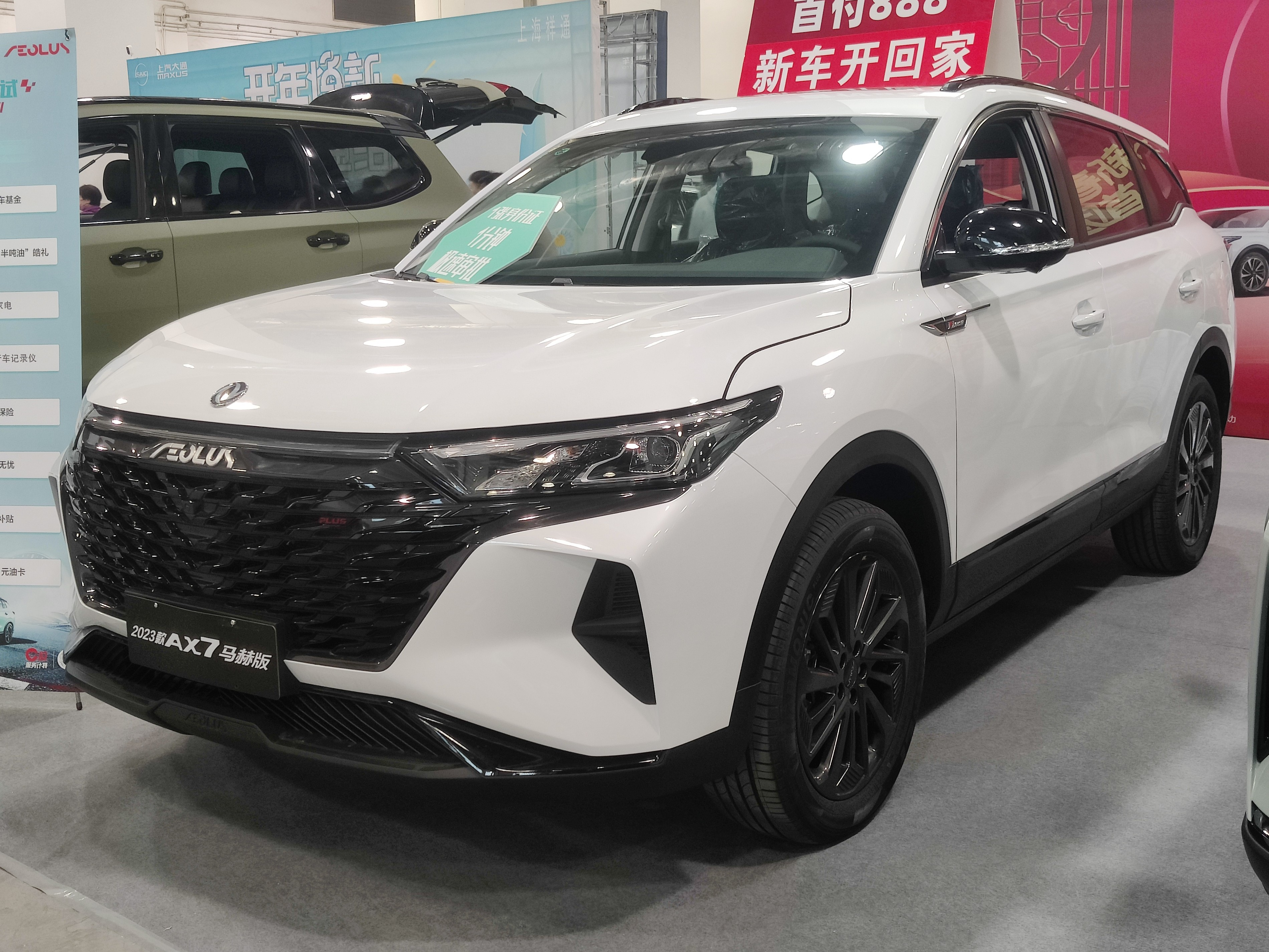
Aeolus AX7 Plus

== Sales ==
Fengshen products are currently sold in China and Venezuela.

Global sales data of Aeolus(Fengshen)
Year	Total
2009	22,000
2010	28,188
2011	28,000
2012	60,200
2013	80,077 (Note: China only.)
2014	80,107
2015	100,417
2016	150,077
2017	125,018
2018	95,641
2019	78,107
2020	70,519
2021	121,570
2022	190,587

== See also ==
- Automobile manufacturers and brands of China
- List of automobile manufacturers of China
