= Aeolus L60 =

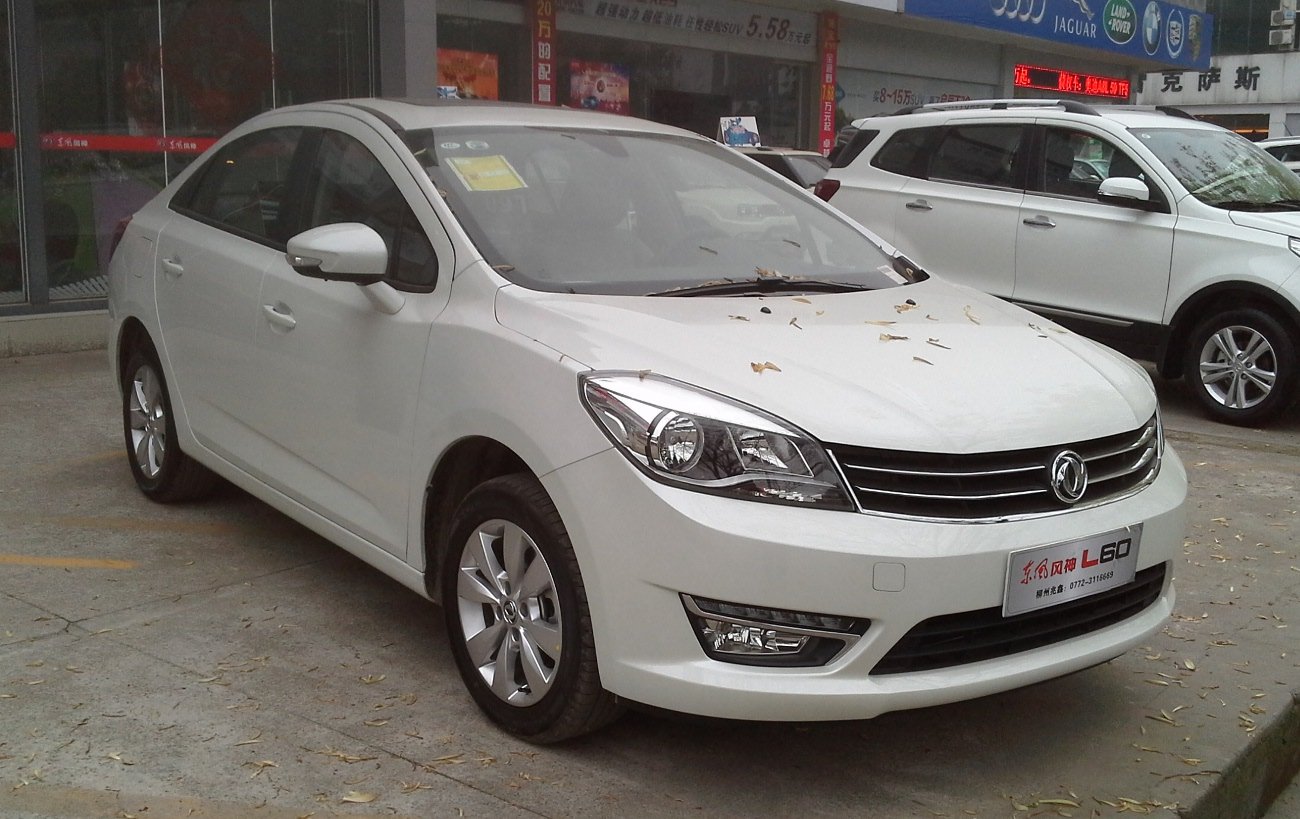

Overview
- Manufacturer: Dongfeng Motor Corporation
- Production: 2015–2019

Body and chassis
- Class: Small family car (C)
- Body style: 4-door saloon
- Layout: FF layout
- Platform: PSA PF2 platform
- Related: Peugeot 308; Peugeot 408

Powertrain
- Engine: 1.6 L TU5JP4 I4 Petrol; 1.8L I4 petrol
- Transmission: 5-speed manual 6-speed automatic

Dimensions
- Wheelbase: 2,710 mm (106.7 in)
- Length: 4,680 mm (184.3 in)
- Width: 1,815 mm (71.5 in)
- Height: 1,525 mm (60.0 in)

Chronology
- Successor: Aeolus Yixuan

The Aeolus L60 is a compact sedan produced by Dongfeng Motor Corporation under the Dongfeng Fengshen sub-brand.

== Overview ==
The Aeolus L60 sedan was previewed by the Dongfeng Fengshen L60 Concept during the 2014 Beijing Auto Show. The production version debuted during the 2015 Shanghai Auto Show in April 2015. The Dongfeng Fengshen L60 is based on the extended version of the PSA PF2 platform that also underpinned the first generation Peugeot 408 compact sedan produced by Dongfeng-PSA in China.

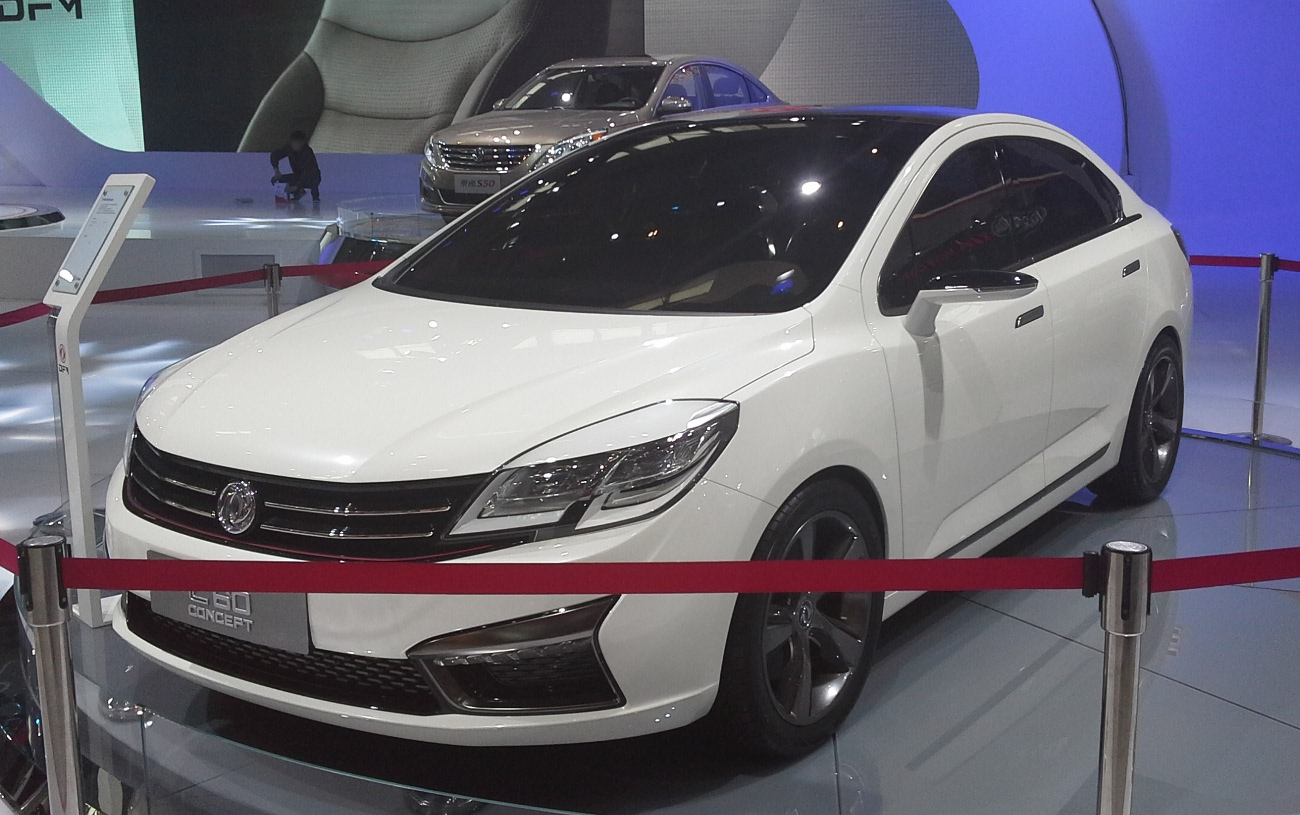
Dongfeng Fengshen L60 Concept front

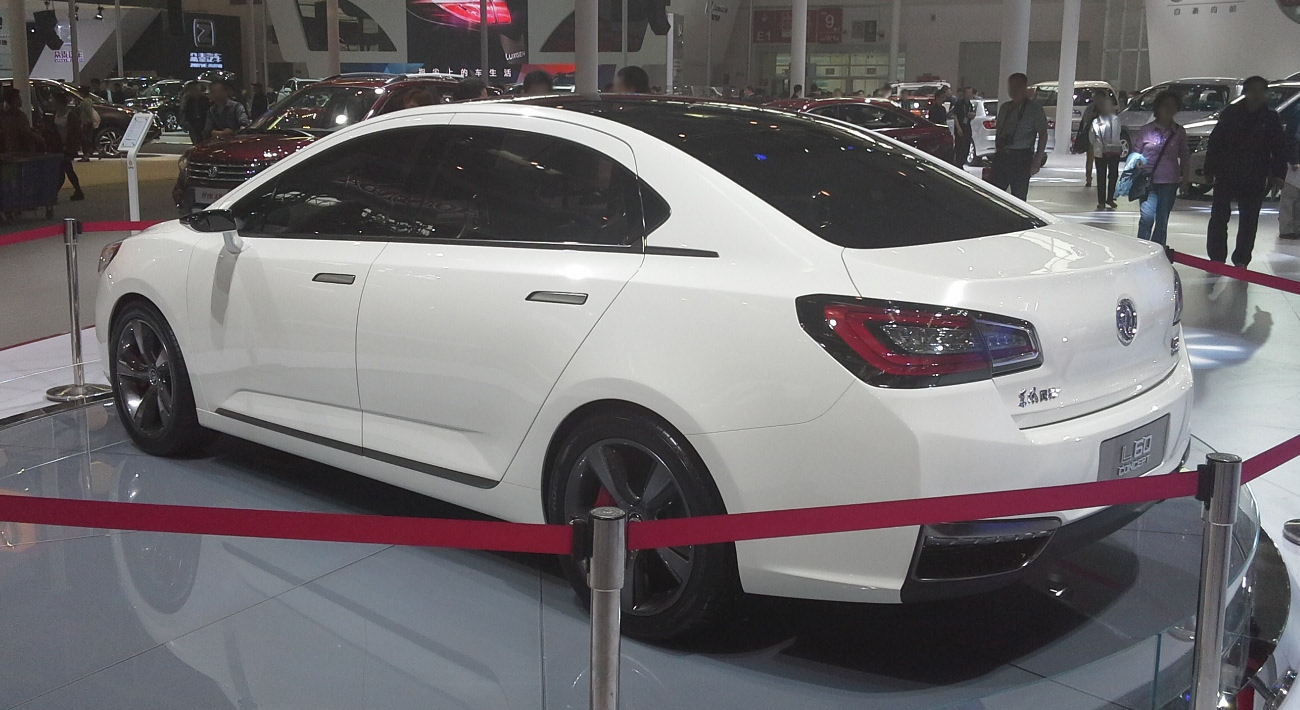
Dongfeng Fengshen L60 Concept rear

=== Market launch ===
The Dongfeng Fengshen L60 sedan was launched on to the Chinese car market in March 2015 with prices starting from 89,700 yuan to 129,700 yuan ($14,436 – 20,874). Engines of the L60 are sourced from PSA, including a 1.6 liter engine with 115 hp and 150 nm, or a 1.8 liter engine with 137 hp and 172 nm. Both engines arevmated to a five-speed manual transmission or a six-speed automatic transmission.

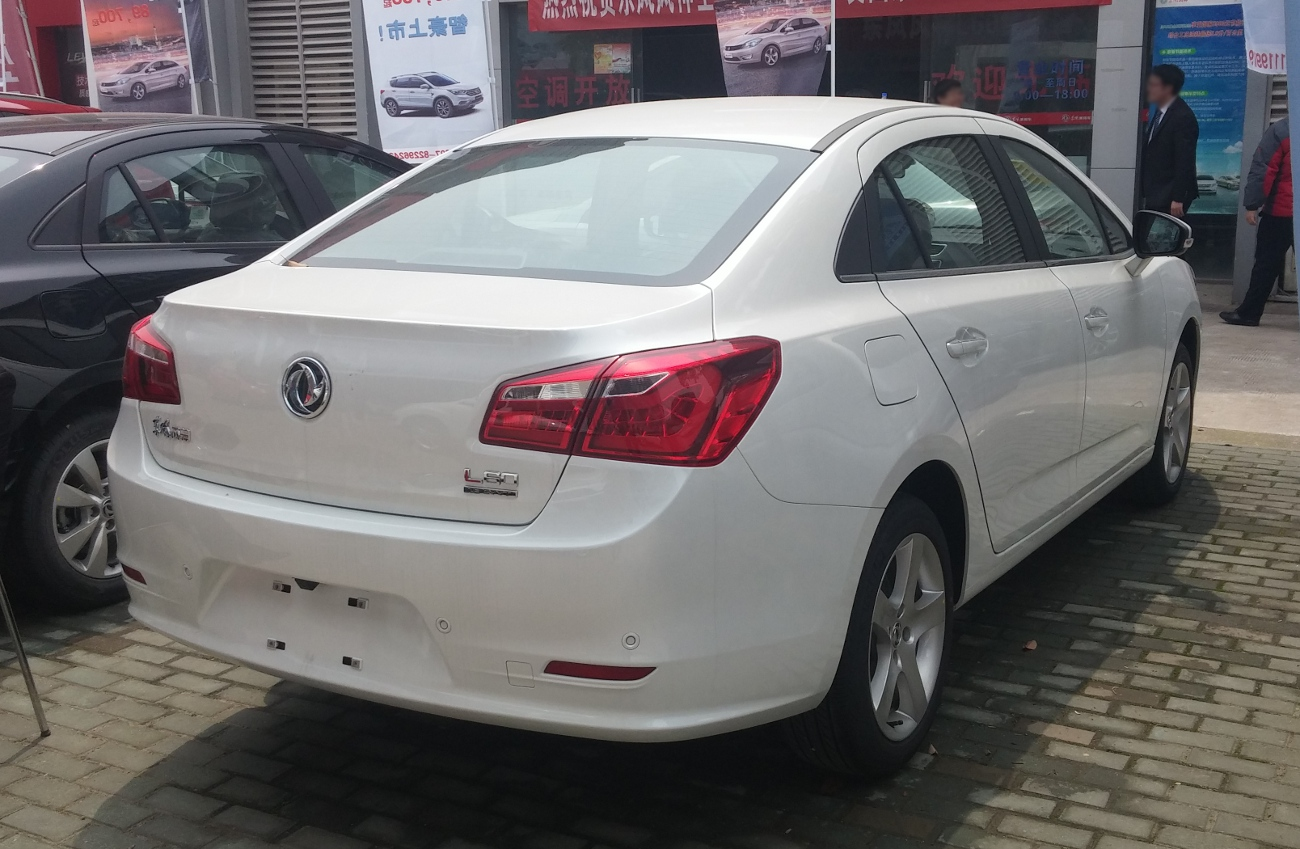
Aeolus L60 rear
