= Aeolus Yixuan GS =

Compact crossover SUV/station wagon

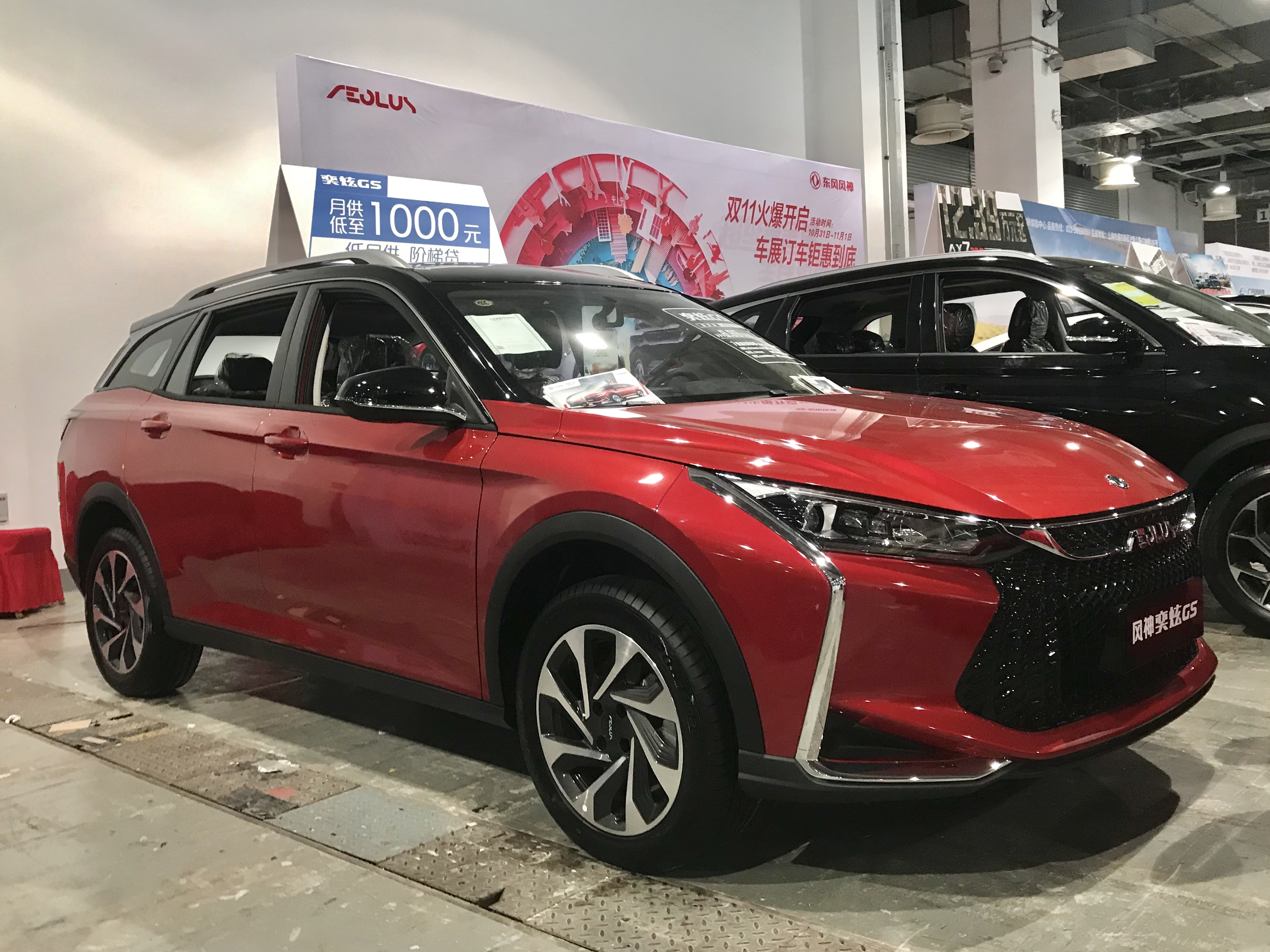

Overview
- Manufacturer: Aeolus (Dongfeng Motor Corporation)
- Also called: Aeolus Yixuan RV; Aeolus Shine GS
- Production: 2020–present
- Assembly: China: Wuhan

Body and chassis
- Class: Compact crossover SUV (C)
- Body style: 5-door SUV
- Layout: Front-engine, front-wheel-drive
- Platform: CMP
- Related: Aeolus Yixuan; Aeolus Yixuan Max

Powertrain
- Engine: Petrol: 1.0 L DFMC10TDS I3 turbo; 1.5 L DFMA15T I4 turbo
- Power output: 92 kW (123 hp; 125 PS) (1.0 L turbo); 110 kW (148 hp; 150 PS) (1.5 L turbo)
- Transmission: 5-speed manual; 6-speed DCT

Dimensions
- Wheelbase: 2,680 mm (105.5 in)
- Length: 4,610 mm (181.5 in)
- Width: 1,830 mm (72.0 in)
- Height: 1,600 mm (63.0 in)

Chronology
- Predecessor: Aeolus H30 Cross

The Aeolus Yixuan GS is a compact crossover SUV based on the Aeolus Yixuan compact sedan produced by Dongfeng Motor Corporation under the Aeolus sub-brand.

== Overview ==
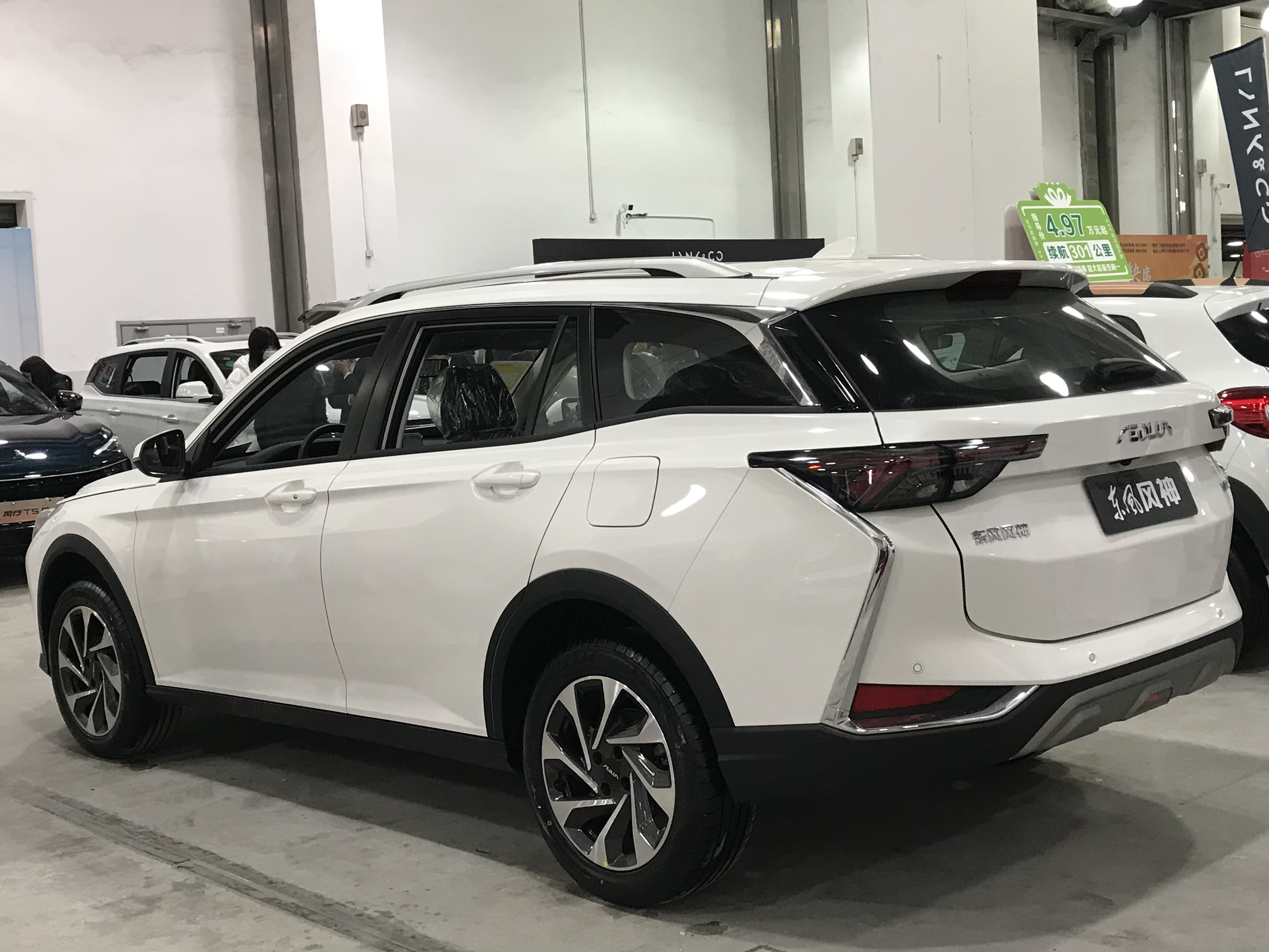
Aeolus Yixuan GS rear quarter

Essentially the SUV version of the Aeolus Yixuan, the Aeolus Yixuan GS debuted in May 2020, and was known as the Yixuan RV during development phase. The Yixuan GS is being listed with a price range of 82,900 yuan to 101,900 yuan.

The engine options of the Aeolus Yixuan GS includes a 1.0-litre inline-three gasoline turbo engine mated to a 5-speed manual gearbox and a 1.5-litre inline-four turbocharged petrol engine mated to either a 5-speed manual gearbox or a 6-speed dual clutch transmission. The 1.0-litre turbocharged engine has maximum power of 125 hp (93 kW; 127 PS) with a peak torque of 230 N⋅m (170 lb⋅ft; 23 kg⋅m) and it was co-developed with PSA and also offered in some Peugeot and Citroën models made in China. The 1.5-litre turbocharged engine has maximum power of 150 hp (112 kW; 152 PS) with a peak torque of 196 N⋅m (145 lb⋅ft; 20 kg⋅m). The Aeolus Yixuan GS features a torsion beam type non-independent suspension.

Technical configurations is the same as the Yixuan sedan including a Level-2 autonomous driving assistance system is also available on the Aeolus Yixuan, supporting functions such as automatic parking, forward collision warning, automatic brake assistance, adaptive cruise control, lane keeping assistance, traffic signal recognition, and intelligent speed limit reminder. The Yixuan will also be equipped with a 7-inch LCD instrument and a 10-inch center console display.

=== Engines ===
Model	Engine	Power	Torque	Fuel economy
200T	1.0L (999cc) DFMC10TDS I3 (turbo petrol)	92 kW (123 hp) at 5500 rpm	196 N⋅m (145 lb⋅ft) at 1500-4500 rpm	5.8 L/100 km (41 mpg_{‑US})
230T	1.5L (1460cc) DFMA15T I4 (turbo petrol)	110 kW (148 hp) at 5500 rpm	230 N⋅m (170 lb⋅ft) at 1800-4000 rpm	6.7 L/100 km (35 mpg_{‑US})
