= Aeolus E30 =

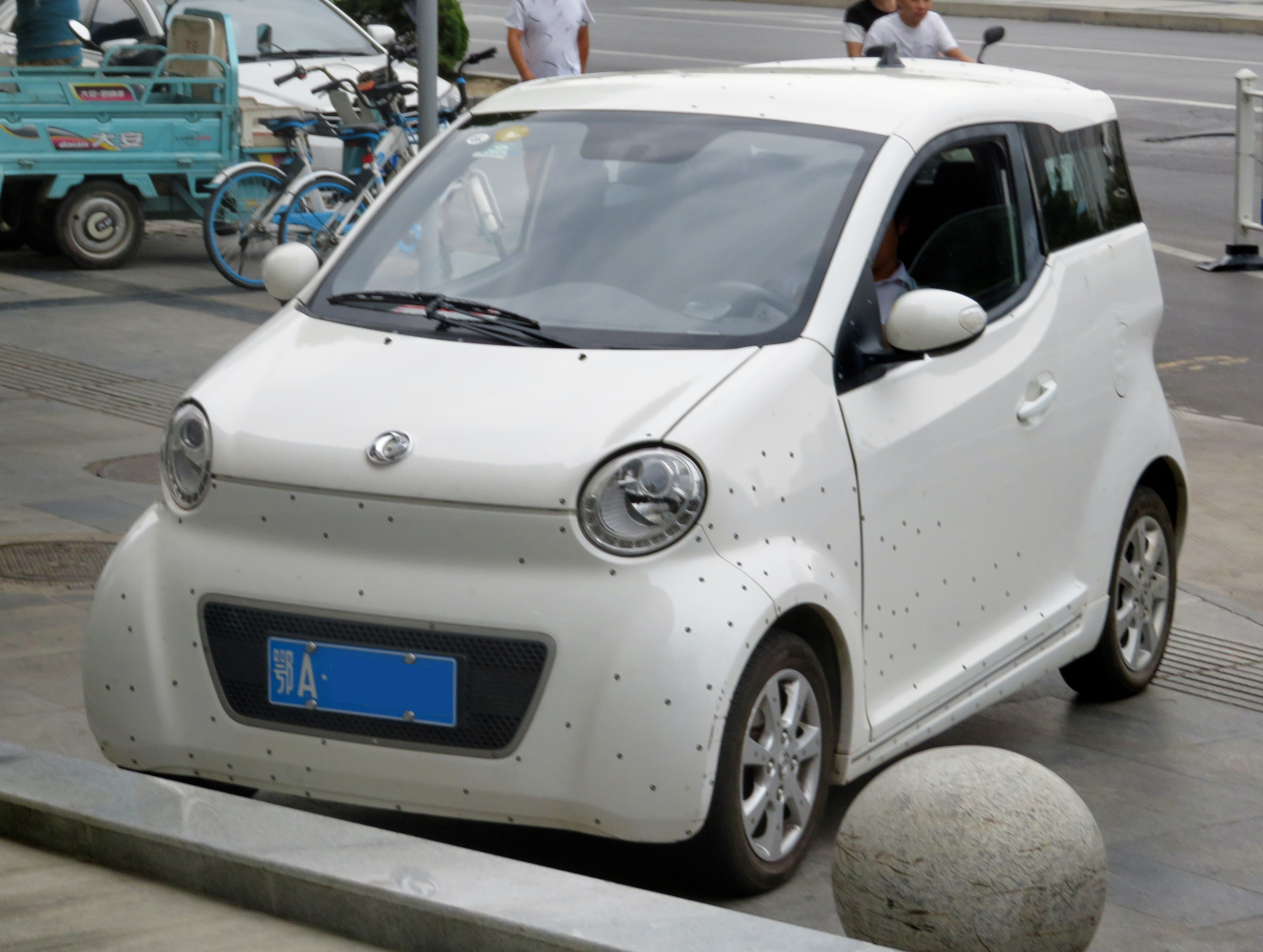

Overview
- Manufacturer: Dongfeng Fengshen
- Also called: Aeolus E30L
- Production: 2015–2016

Body and chassis
- Class: All-Electric Supermini
- Body style: 3-door hatchback
- Layout: Front Motor, FWD

Powertrain
- Electric motor: 10.5 kW Permanent-Magnet Synchronous
- Transmission: Single-speed Automatic
- Battery: Ternary lithium battery

Dimensions
- Wheelbase: 1,860 mm (73.2 in); 2,160 mm (85.0 in) (E30L)
- Length: 2,695 mm (106.1 in); 2,995 mm (117.9 in) (E30L)
- Width: 1,560 mm (61.4 in)
- Height: 1,595 mm (62.8 in)
- Kerb weight: 1,080 kg (2,381 lb)

The Aeolus E30 and Aeolus E30L is an all-electric car that is manufactured by the Chinese manufacturer Dongfeng Fengshen or Aeolus.

== Overview ==
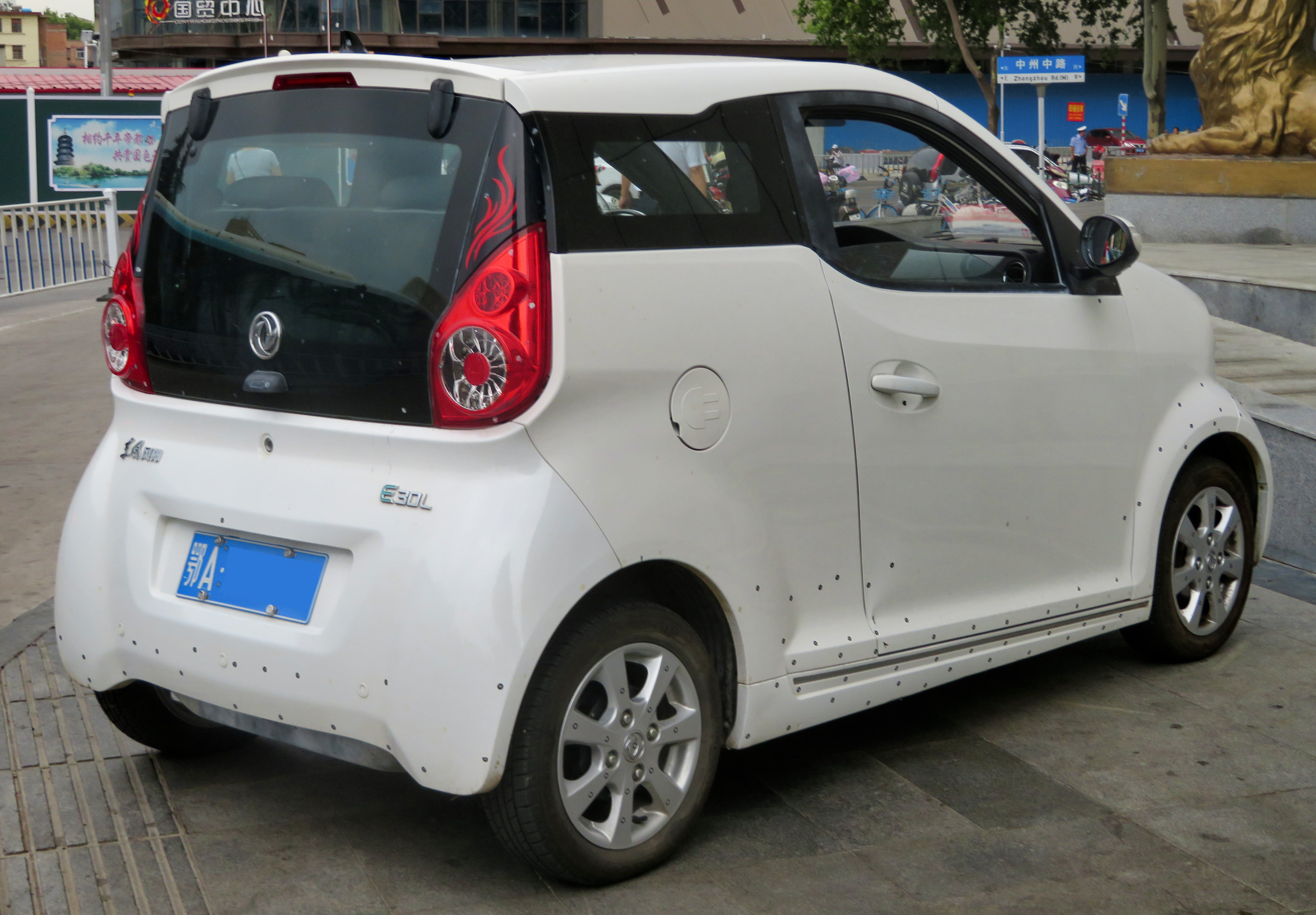
Aeolus E30L (rear)

The Aeolus E30 was revealed in 2011 as the Dongfeng EJ02 EV. The name was changed to Dongfeng EV1 in early 2012 and was changed again to Fengshen E30 in April 2012 while on display at the Beijing Auto Show with production confirmed in 2013 and the final market launch in March 2015. The E30 is the short-wheelbase two-seater version, and the E30L is the longer four-seater version, with the E30L adding 30 centimeters to the wheelbase of the E30.

The Aeolus E30 and Aeolus E30L are both powered by an electric motor producing 34PS (25 kW), capable of an 80 km/h top speed. Dongfeng claims a range of 110 to 180 kilometers (68 to 112 miles) from a single charge.
