= Aeolus AX4 =

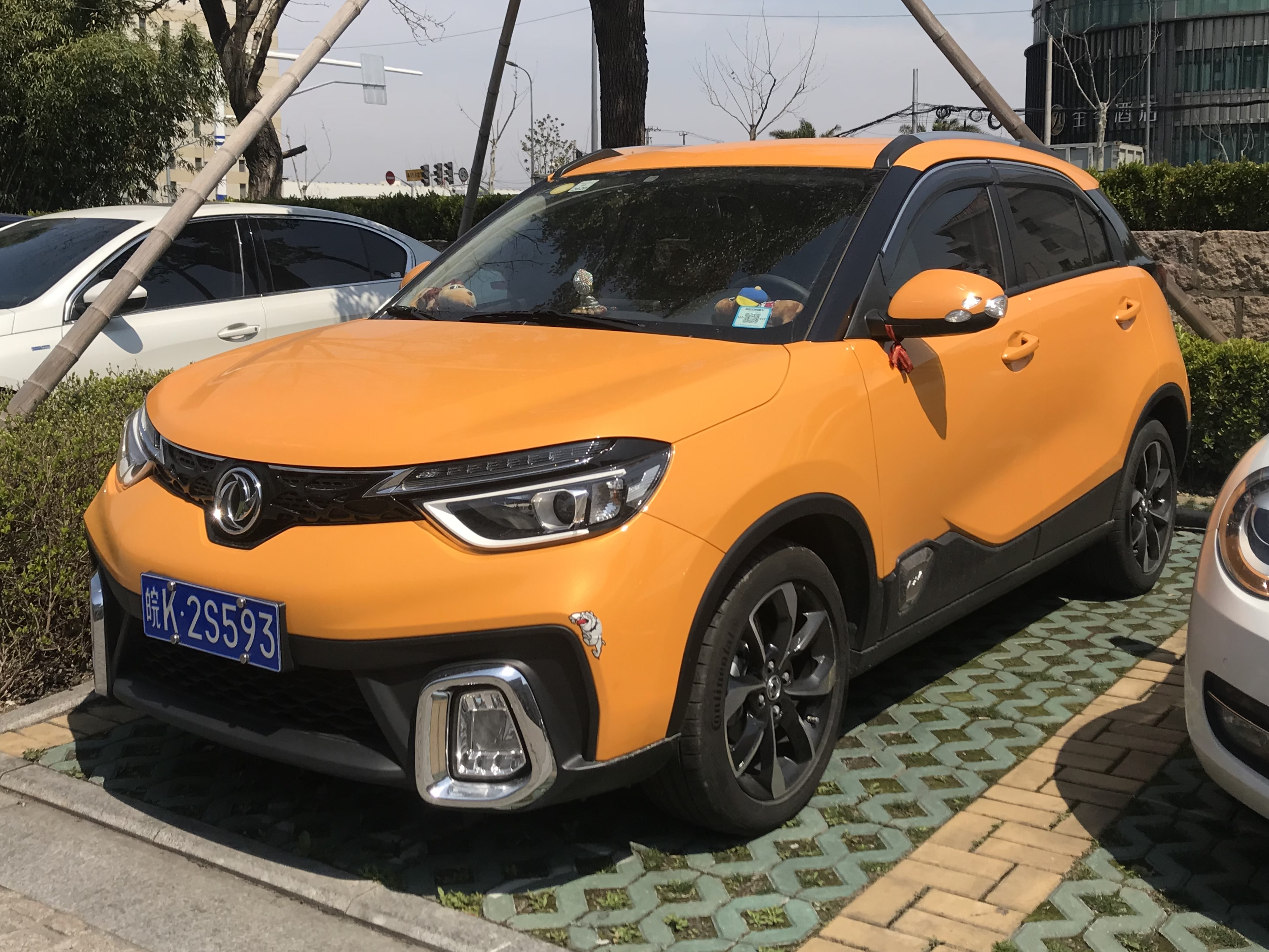

Overview
- Manufacturer: Aeolus
- Also called: Dongfeng Fengshen AX4
- Production: 2017–2021
- Model years: 2017–2021

Body and chassis
- Layout: Front-engine, front-wheel-drive
- Platform: PSA DF1 platform

Powertrain
- Engine: 1.6 L DFM A16 I4 (petrol); 1.4 L DFM A14T turbo I4 (petrol); 1.0 L DFM C10TDS Turbo I3
- Power output: 103 kW (140.0 PS; 138.1 bhp) (DFM A14T); 91 kW (123.7 PS; 122.0 bhp) (DFM A16); 95 kW (129.2 PS; 127.4 bhp) (DFM C10TDS)
- Transmission: 5-speed manual 6-speed automatic 6-speed DCT

Dimensions
- Wheelbase: 2,580 mm (101.6 in)
- Length: 4,195 mm (165.2 in)
- Width: 1,780 mm (70.1 in)
- Height: 1,622 mm (63.9 in)

The Aeolus AX4, formerly called the Dongfeng Fengshen AX4, is a subcompact crossover SUV produced by Dongfeng Motor Corporation under the Dongfeng Fengshen sub-brand.

== Overview ==
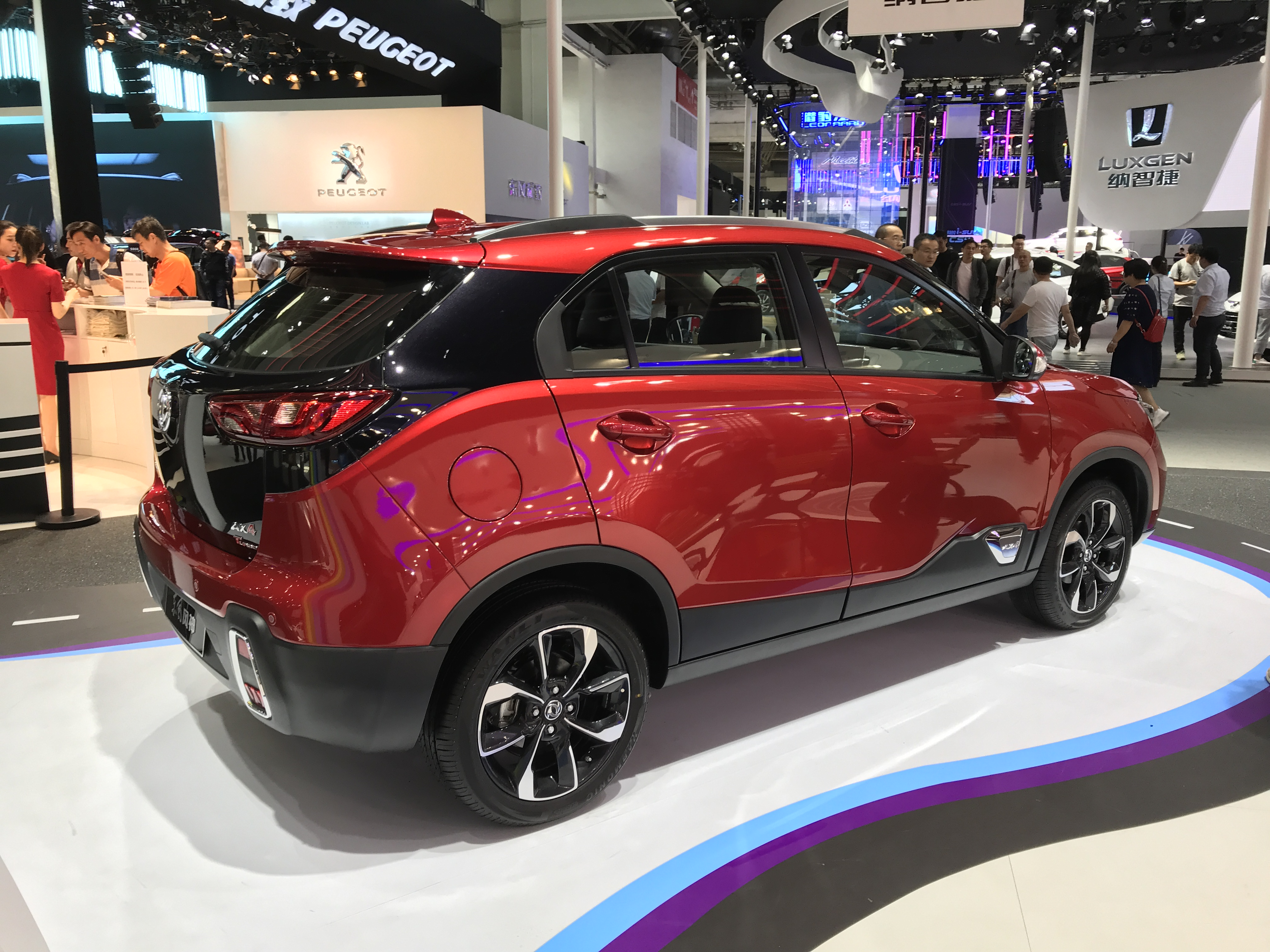
Dongfeng Fengshen AX4 at the 2017 Shanghai Auto Show

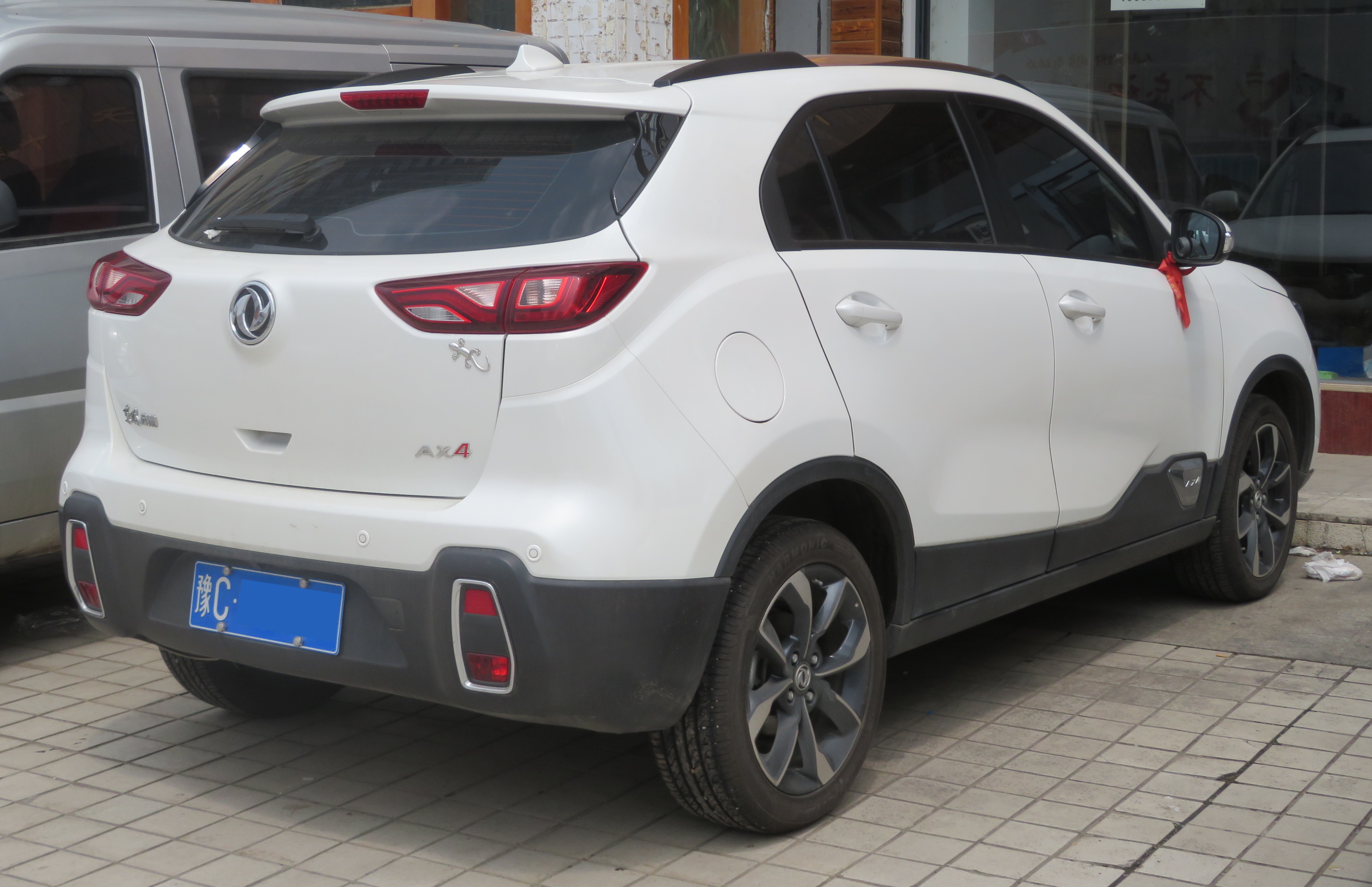
Dongfeng Fengshen AX4 rear

The AX4 was positioned above the slightly longer AX3 subcompact crossover and below the much larger AX5 compact crossover. The Dongfeng Fengshen AX4 was unveiled on the 2017 Shanghai Auto Show with the market launch in September 2017.

=== Powertrain ===
The engines available for the AX4 is a 1.4 liter turbo engine with the maximum power of 103 kW and peak torque of 196Nm, or a 1.6 liter engine with the maximum power of 91 kW respectively and peak torque of 153Nm. The 1.4 liter turbo engine is matched with a 6-speed DCT gearbox, with 6.5 liter fuel consumption for 100 km; 1.6 liter engine is matched with 5-speed manual transmission or 6-speed DCT gearbox, with 5.9 liter fuel consumption for 100 km.
