= Aeolus Yixuan Max =

Mid-size sedan

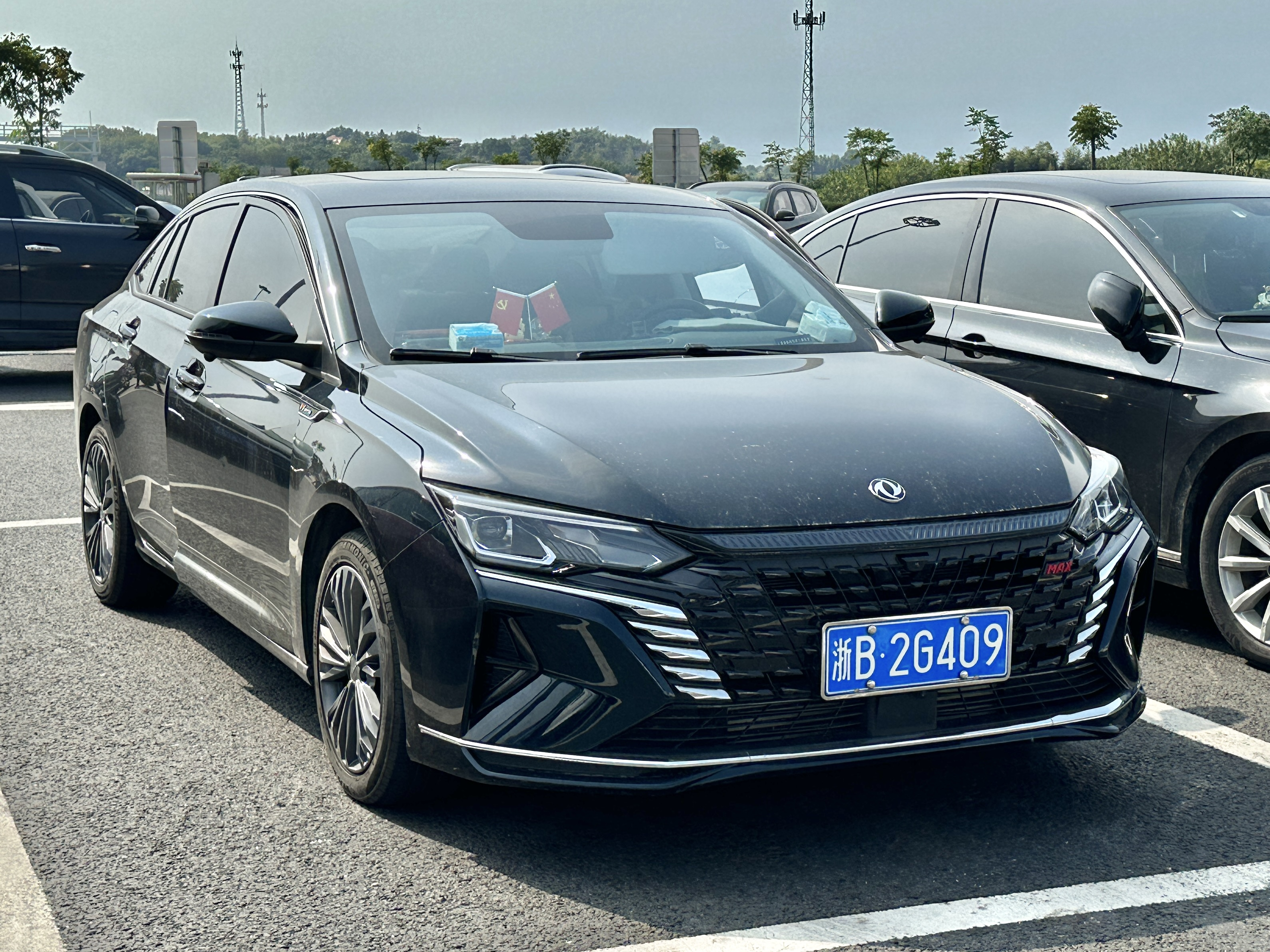

Overview
- Manufacturer: Aeolus (Dongfeng Motor Corporation)
- Model code: G35
- Also called: Dongfeng Shine Max (Iran); Dongfeng A60 Max (Middle East)
- Production: 2021–2025
- Assembly: China

Body and chassis
- Class: Mid-size car (D)
- Body style: 4-door sedan
- Layout: Front-engine, front-wheel-drive
- Platform: Dongfeng Superior Modular Architecture (DSMA)
- Related: Aeolus Yixuan

Powertrain
- Engine: 1.5 L DFM C15TDR I4 (turbo petrol)
- Electric motor: Permanent magnet synchronous (EV500)
- Power output: 151 kW (205.3 PS; 202.5 hp) (C15TDR); 124.5 kW (169.3 PS; 167.0 hp) (EV)
- Transmission: 7-speed DCT; 1-speed direct-drive (EV)

Dimensions
- Wheelbase: 2,770 mm (109.1 in)
- Length: 4,797 mm (188.9 in)
- Width: 1,870 mm (73.6 in)
- Height: 1,475 mm (58.1 in)
- Curb weight: 1,486 kg (3,276 lb) (petrol); 1,560 kg (3,439 lb) (hybrid)

The Aeolus Yixuan Max is a mid-size sedan produced by Dongfeng Motor Corporation under the Aeolus sub-brand.

== Overview ==
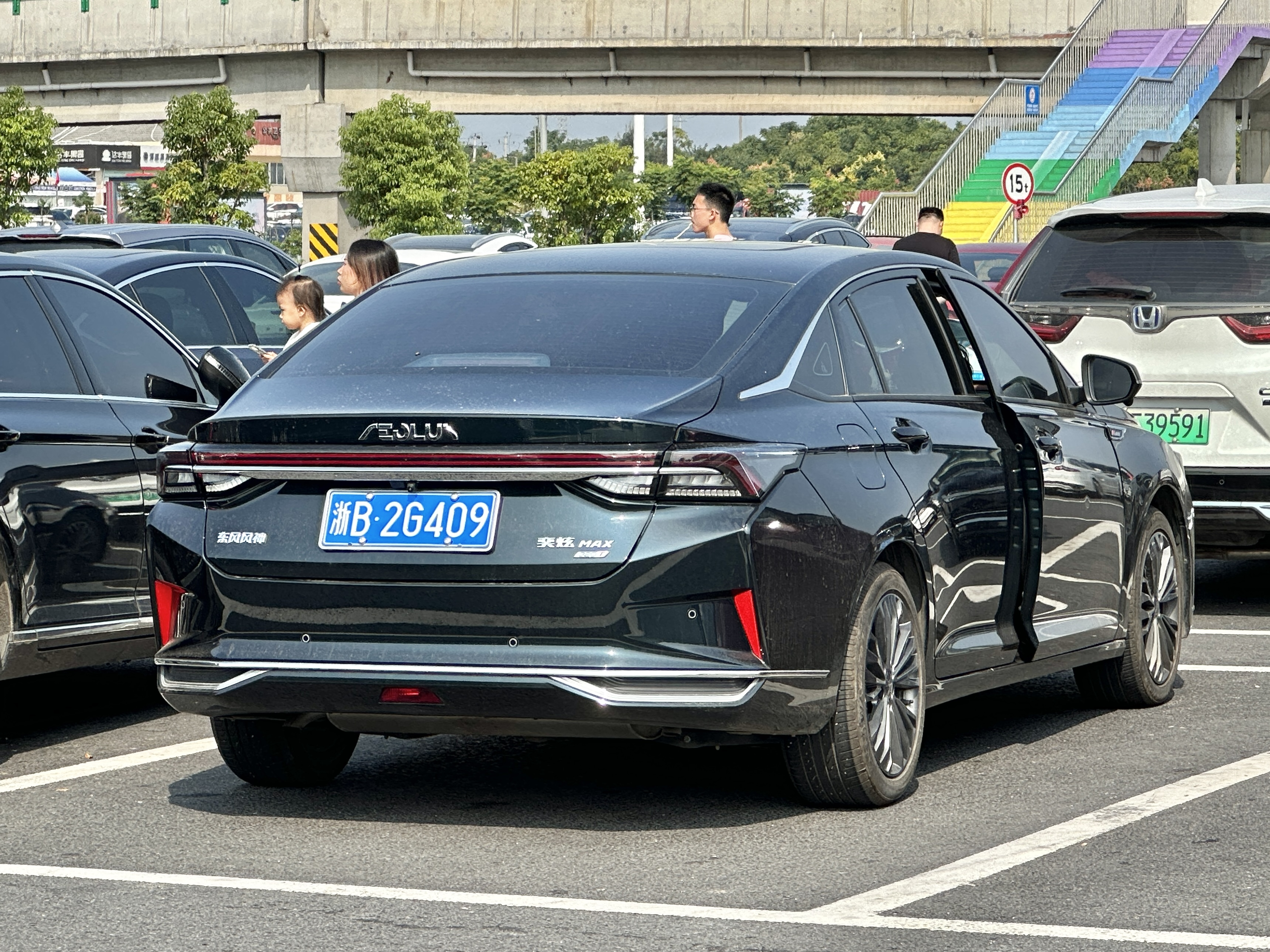
Rear view

The Aeolus Yixuan Max was launched for in 2021 during the 2021 Shanghai Auto Show, featuring the Aeolus family design language for the front and rear.

== Powertrain ==
The engine options of the Aeolus Yixuan Max is a 1.5-litre petrol turbo engine codenamed C15TDR with a maximum power of 140 kW (188 hp) with a peak torque of 300 N⋅m (221 lb⋅ft) mated into a 7-speed dual-clutch transmission. The hybrid model features a combination of HD120 motor powertrain which produce 120 kW (161 hp).

Model	Engine	Power	Torque	Fuel economy
Petrol models	1.5L (1476cc) DFMC15TP1 I4 (turbo petrol)	140 kW (188 hp) at 5200 rpm	300 N⋅m (221 lb⋅ft) at 2000-4000 rpm	5.9 L/100 km (40 mpg_{‑US}) (manual); 6.2 L/100 km (38 mpg_{‑US}) (7DCT)
Hybrid models	1.5L (1476cc) DFMC15TE1 I4 (turbo petrol)+ HD120 motor	Engine: 120 kW (161 hp) at 5200 rpm Motor: 130 kW (174 hp) Total: 151 kW (202 hp)	230 N⋅m (170 lb⋅ft) at 1500-4500 rpm + 300 N⋅m (221 lb⋅ft)	4.3 L/100 km (55 mpg_{‑US})

== Technology ==
This Yixuan Max is equipped with the Level 3 driving assistance system, which integrates 28 auxiliary functions. The system uses 5 ultra-high definition cameras, 5 mmWave radars and 12 ultrasonic radars to ensure the safety of the 360° surrounding environment and monitors distances within 200 m (660 ft; 220 yd) when the vehicle is moving forward, crossing the intersection, changing lanes, drive away at high speed and fast parking. The infotainment system features the latest Windlink 6.0 car system, which has intelligent voice command, intelligent car control and rich car ecosystem, CCTV audio and video, in-car karaoke, Huawei HiCar and Smart View car control.

== Yixuan Max EV ==
An electric variant is also available with the powertrain carried over from the Yixuan EV; a 167 hp (125 kW; 169 PS) single electric motor and a 400 km (249 mi) NEDC range.
