= AX7 =

AX7 or AX-7 may refer to:

- Aeolus AX7, a 2014–present Chinese compact SUV
- Roland AX-7, a keytar

== See also ==
- A7X
