= Dongfeng Fengdu =

Zhengzhou Nissan sub-brand, Dongfeng Automobile division

- Product type: Automobile marque
- Current owner: Dongfeng Motor Group; Zhengzhou-Nissan
- Country: China
- Introduced: April 2013
- Markets: China

Dongfeng Fengshen
- Simplified Chinese: 东风风度
Transcriptions
Standard Mandarin
- Hanyu Pinyin: Dōng fēng Fēng dù

Fengdu (风度) is a sub-brand of Zhengzhou Nissan, a subsidiary of Dongfeng Automobile, launched during the 2013 Shanghai Auto Show. As the aim of the Fengdu brand is to focus on producing affordable Crossover utility vehicles, the product line of the brand started by producing out of production Nissan CUVs bearing the Dongfeng logo.

== History ==
Dongfeng Automobile Company has decided to diversify the Dongfeng CUV product line. For this purpose the sub-brand of Fengdu was created. Older Nissan tooling was set up in China by Zhengzhou-Nissan to produce the second generation Nissan X-Trail rebadged as the Dongfeng Fengdu MX6.

== Products ==
The current Fengdu range comprises the following models:

- Dongfeng Fengdu Paladin (2018–present), a mid-size five-door SUV based on the Nissan Terra and produced by Zhengzhou Nissan.

=== Discontinued ===
- Dongfeng Fengdu MX3 (2017; cancelled), a subcompact five-door CUV based on the Aeolus AX5
- Dongfeng Fengdu MX5 (2016–17), a compact five-door CUV based on the Aeolus AX7
- Dongfeng Fengdu MX6 (2015–19), a compact five-door CUV based on the Nissan X-Trail
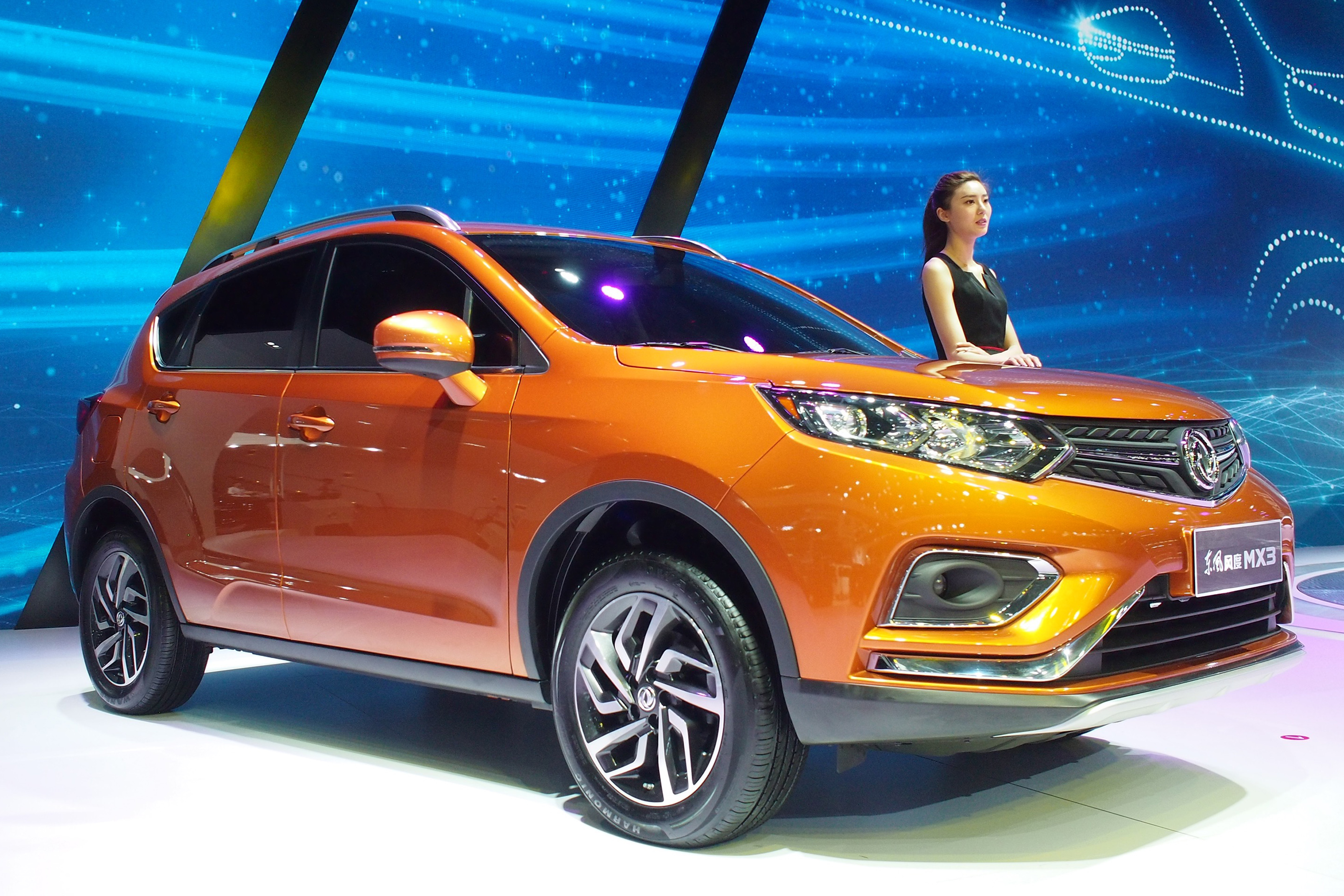
Fengdu MX3

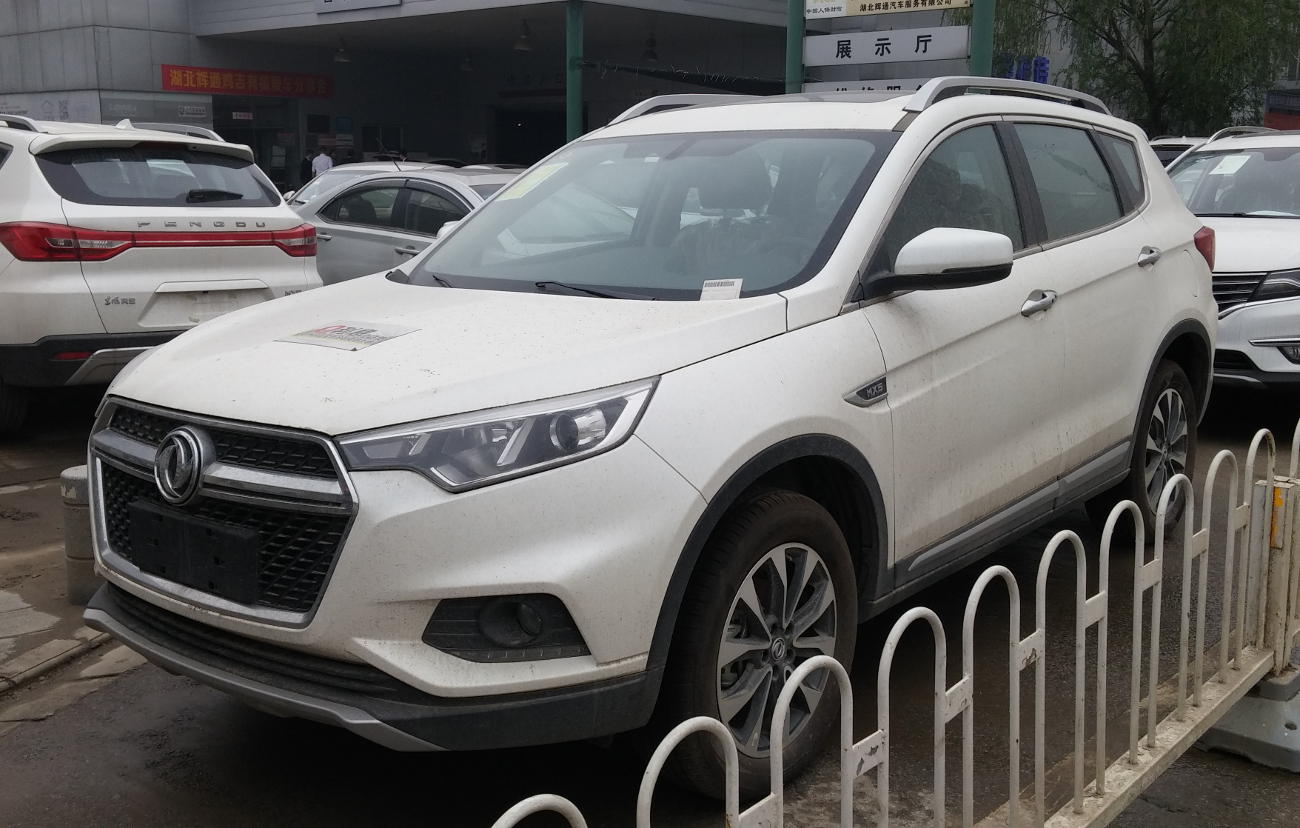
Fengdu MX5

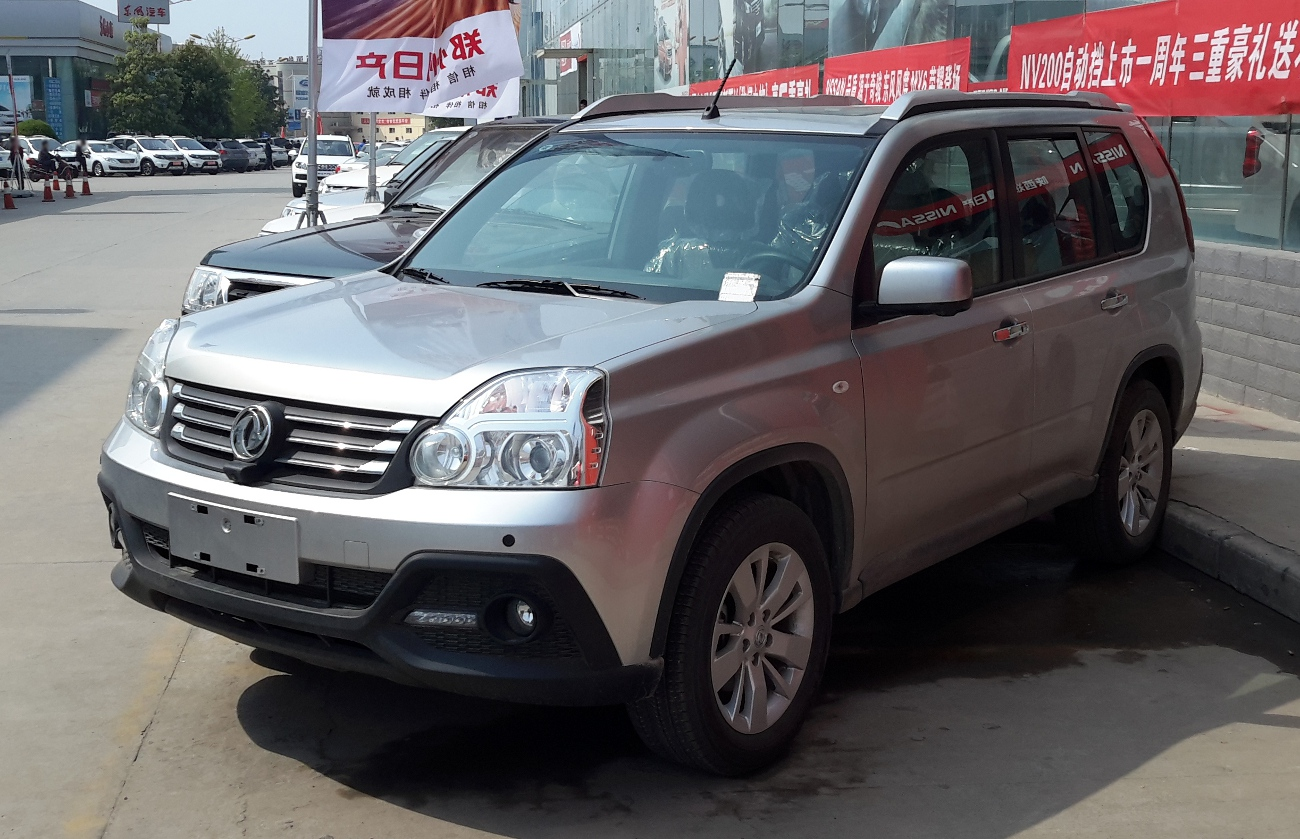
Fengdu MX6
