= Aeolus Haoji =

Compact SUV

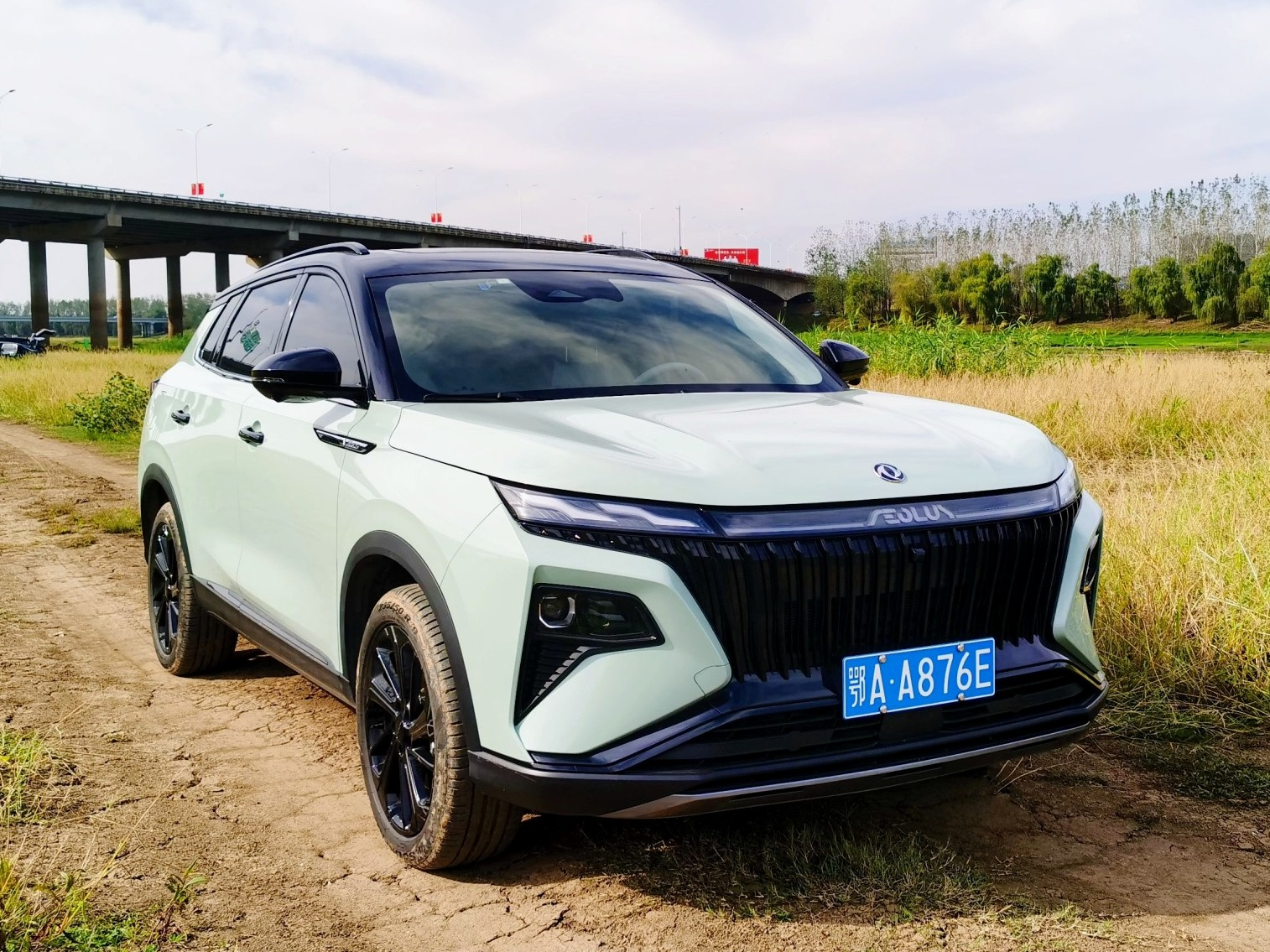

Overview
- Manufacturer: Aeolus (Dongfeng Motor Corporation)
- Also called: Dongfeng Huge (export)
- Production: 2022–present
- Assembly: China: Wuhan

Body and chassis
- Class: Compact SUV (C)
- Body style: 5-door SUV
- Layout: Front engine, front-wheel-drive
- Platform: DSMA platform
- Related: Aeolus Haohan

Powertrain
- Engine: Petrol: 1.5 L DFMC15TP1 turbo I4; Petrol hybrid: 1.5 L DFMC15TE1 I4 turbo + electric motor "HD120"
- Electric motor: 1x AC PMSM (hybrid)
- Transmission: 7-speed dual-clutch; e-CVT (hybrid)
- Hybrid drivetrain: Parallel (hybrid)
- Battery: Li-ion battery (hybrid)

Dimensions
- Wheelbase: 2,825 mm (111 in)
- Length: 4,720 mm (186 in)
- Width: 1,910 mm (75 in)
- Height: 1,702 mm (67 in)

Chronology
- Predecessor: Aeolus AX5

The Aeolus Haoji (风神 皓极, also called Dongfeng Huge in the export market), is a compact SUV produced by Dongfeng Motor Corporation under the Aeolus sub-brand. The Haoji compact SUV is built on the DSMA platform developed by Dongfeng for conventional petrol and hybrid models. A plug-in hybrid version called the Aeolus L8 was launched in August 2025.

== Overview ==
The Haoji was opened pre-sale on June 18, 2022 and was launched in August 2022. It is a compact SUV positioned above the slightly smaller AX7 within the lineup of the Aeolus brand, while dimensions are slightly closer to traditional mid size SUVs.

=== Interior ===
The dashboard of the Haoji has a 12.3-inch twin-screen setup with a screen for the car infotainment system and a screen for the instrument panel with level 2 driver assistance system for safety. The screen can be controlled by touch or a rotary dial on the left side of the center tunnel. The petrol version of the Haoji is equipped with the Jamo audio system.

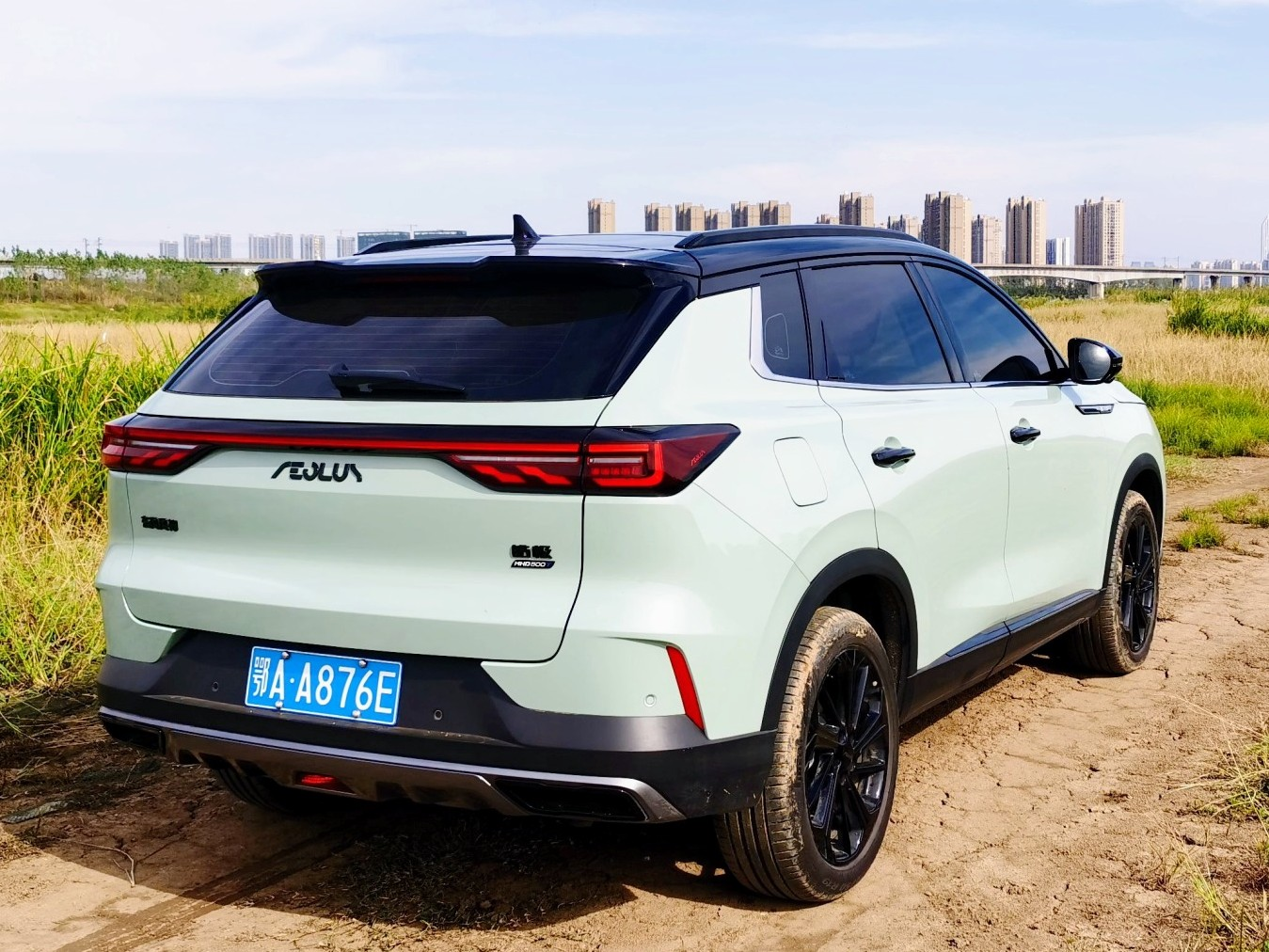
Rear view

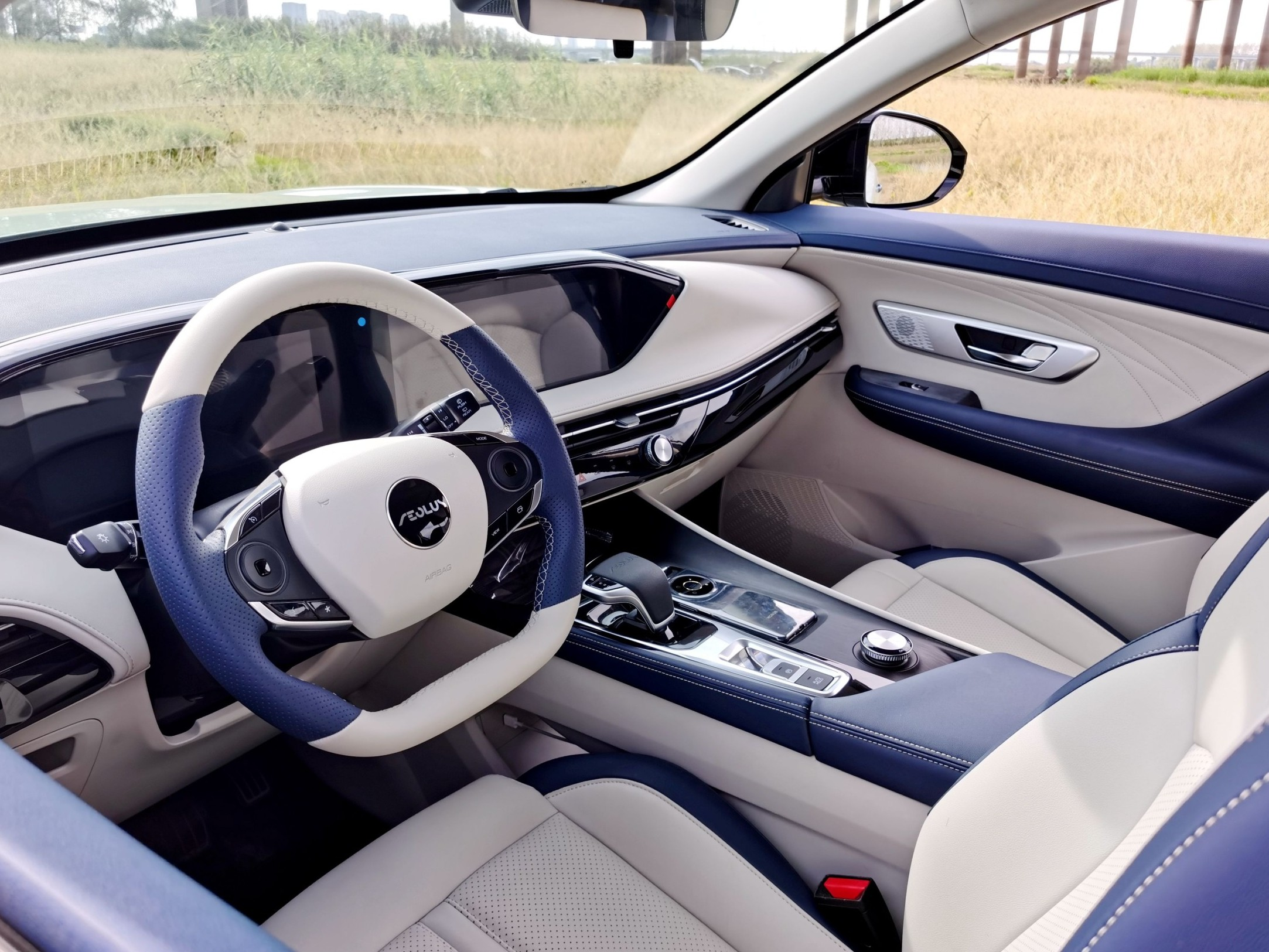
Interior

== Powertrain ==
The Haoji is offered with petrol and full hybrid powertrains. The petrol version gets a 1.5-litre turbo engine developing 204 PS (150 kW; 201 hp) and 350 N⋅m (260 lb⋅ft), mated to a 7-speed DCT gearbox. The hybrid version gets the Dongfeng Mach MHD hybrid system with the same 1.5-litre turbo engine plus an electric motor (HD120) producing 245 PS (180 kW; 242 hp) and 540 N⋅m (400 lb⋅ft), mated to an E-CVT.

Model	Engine/Motor	Power	Torque	Fuel economy
Petrol	1.5 L (1476cc) DFMC15TP1 I4 (turbo petrol)	150 kW (201 hp) at 6000 rpm	305 N⋅m (225 lb⋅ft) at 2000-4000 rpm	6.99 L/100 km (34 mpg_{‑US})
MHD (hybrid)	1.5 L (1476cc) DFMC15TE1 I4 (turbo petrol) + HD120 motor	Engine: 130 kW (174 hp) at 1500-4500 rpm Motor: 130 kW (174 hp) Combined: 180 kW (241 hp)	540 N⋅m (398 lb⋅ft)	5.8 L/100 km (41 mpg_{‑US})

== Aeolus L8 ==
Aeolus L8
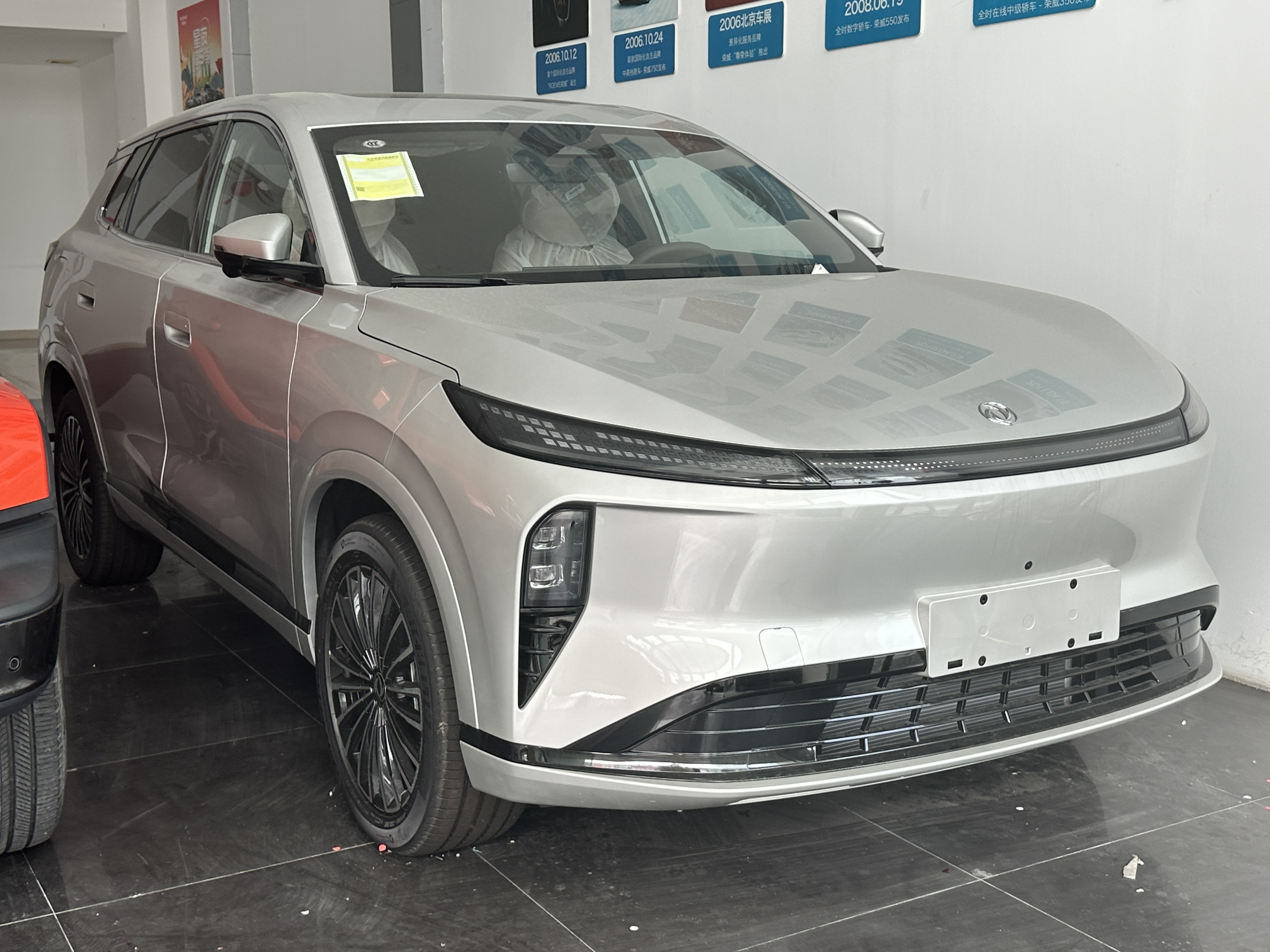

Overview
- Also called: Aeolus L8+ (2026–present)
- Production: 2025–present
- Assembly: China: Wuhan

Body and chassis
- Layout: Front engine, front-wheel-drive
- Platform: DSMA platform

Powertrain
- Engine: Petrol plug-in hybrid: 1.5 L DFMC15TE3 I4 turbo engine
- Electric motor: 100 kW TZ220XY003 PMSM
- Transmission: 4-speed DHT
- Hybrid drivetrain: Series-parallel
- Battery: 18.1 kWh Mach LFP CALB; 27 kWh Mach LFP CALB; 30.3 kWh Mach LFP CALB
- Electric range: 82–156 km (51–97 mi) (WLTP); 112–220 km (70–137 mi) (CLTC)

Dimensions
- Wheelbase: 2,825 mm (111 in)
- Length: 4,762 mm (187 in)
- Width: 1,910 mm (75 in)
- Height: 1,677 mm (66 in)
- Curb weight: 1,876–1,958 kg (4,136–4,317 lb)

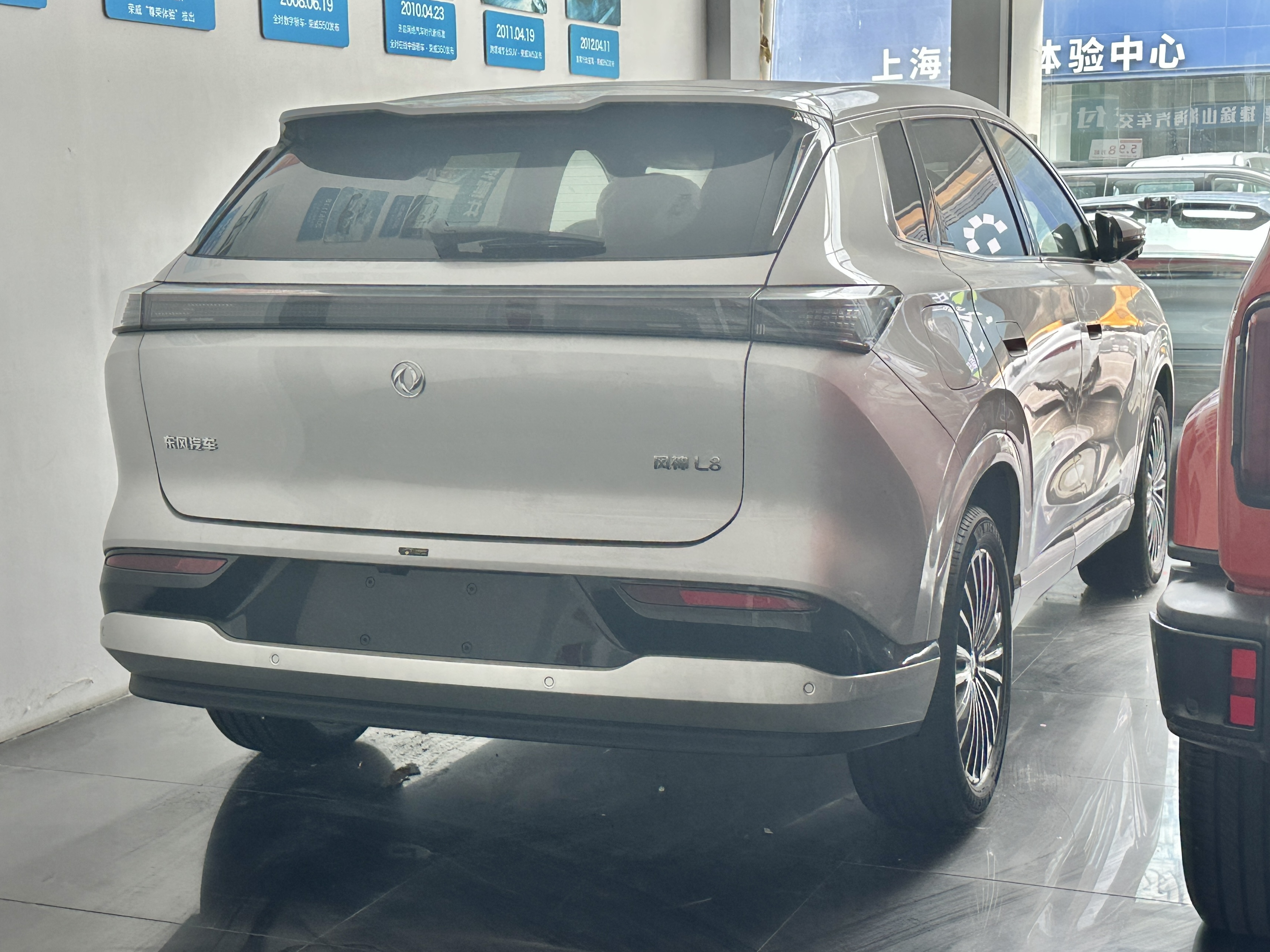
Rear view

On 1 August 2025, the Dongfeng launched the Aeolus L8 (Chinese: 东风风神L8; pinyin: dōngfēng fēngshén L8), the plug-in hybrid version of the Haoji. It features a restyled exterior that is 42 mm (1.7 in) longer and 25 mm (0.98 in) lower, but other dimensions remain unchanged.

The front features a grille-less design with a lower air intake, while the corners have air curtain vents. It uses a split-headlight design, with the beams located in the vent area while the top features daytime running lights consisting of a light bar and a customizable grid of LEDs. The doors feature pocket-style handles, and it is equipped with 19-inch wheels. The rear features taillights consisting of a light bar with a customizable array of LEDs similar to the front. The bumper has a contrasting two-tone black design, and it has a twin-peaked spoiler. The interior features an 8.88-inch digital instrument cluster and a 15.6-inch 2.5K-resolution central infotainment touchscreen powered by a Qualcomm Snapdragon 8155 SoC, and supports Apple Carplay, Huawei HiCar, and ICCOA CarLink. The rear passengers have folding seatback tables, an optional 15.6-inch 2.5K-resolution roof-mounted entertainment display, and a refrigerator compartment in the center console. It is equipped with a standard 8-speaker sound system, which can be optionally upgraded to a 19-speaker WANOS 7.1.2 surround sound system featuring integrated driver's seat headrest speakers.

=== 2027 update (Aeolus L8+) ===
The 2027 model year update was launched on 23 October 2026 and renames the model to Aeolus L8+.

The front features minor changes to the exterior, including modified lower front bumper with the addition of active grille shutters, an optional roof-mounted LiDAR sensor, traditional loop-style door handles replacing pocket-style handles to comply with new Chinese safety regulations, redesigned taillight lighting within the same shape, and a body color painted rear bumper. All dimensions remain identical apart from height, which increases by 9 mm (0.35 in) to 1,686 mm (66.4 in).

It now comes standard with a heated steering wheel, the panoramic sunroof now has a power sunshade, and the rear seats now have an available heating. The cockpit chip can be optionally upgraded to the Qualcomm Snapdragon 8295 with 24GB of RAM and 256GB of storage.

It is now available with the Tianyuan T800 (Chinese: 天元智驾T800; pinyin: Tiānyuán zhìjià T800) ADAS system, which has a sensor suite consisting of one roof-mounted Hesai ATX LiDAR, 3 mmWave radars, 11 cameras and 12 ultrasonic sensors and is powered by an Nvidia Drive Thor-U chip using Momenta's R7 world model, and is capable of supervised Level 2 autonomous driving in highway and urban conditions.

The powertrain remains unchanged, but is now only available with the 30.3 kWh battery pack offering 156 km (97 mi) of WLTP electric range.

== Powertrain ==
It is equipped with Dongfeng Mach plug-in hybrid powertrain using a 1.5-liter turbocharged engine outputting 110 kW (148 hp; 150 PS) (113 kW (152 hp; 154 PS) gross) at 5,200 rpm and 240 N⋅m (177 lb⋅ft) of torque at 3,500–4,500 rpm, and has a peak thermal efficiency of 45.2%. It is paired with a 4-speed series-parallel DHT transmission which contains a permanent magnet synchronous traction motor outputting 134 hp (100 kW; 136 PS) and 260 N⋅m (192 lb⋅ft) of torque, for combined output of 355 hp (265 kW; 360 PS) and 615 N⋅m (454 lb⋅ft) of torque driving the front wheels.

It is equipped with a selection of Mach (Chinese: 马赫电池; pinyin: Mǎhè diànchí) LFP battery packs supplied by CALB, outputting 82–156 km (51–97 mi) of WLTP electric range and 112–220 km (70–137 mi) CLTC electric range, while a 55-liter (14.5 U.S. gal) fuel tank allows for combined CLTC range of 1,339–1,505 km (832–935 mi). All battery packs are capable of recharging from 20–80% within 18 minutes.

Specifications
Battery		System total		Electric range		Total range	20–80% charge	Kerb weight
Capacity	Weight	Power	Torque	WLTP	CLTC	CLTC	20–80% charge	Kerb weight
18.06 kWh	177 kg (390 lb)	355 hp (265 kW; 360 PS)	615 N⋅m (454 lb⋅ft)	82 km (51 mi)	112 km (70 mi)	1,339 km (832 mi)	18 min	1,876 kg (4,136 lb)
27.01 kWh	225 kg (496 lb)	355 hp (265 kW; 360 PS)	615 N⋅m (454 lb⋅ft)	125 km (78 mi)	160 km (99 mi)	1,387 km (862 mi)	18 min	1,925 kg (4,244 lb)
30.32 kWh	243 kg (536 lb)	355 hp (265 kW; 360 PS)	615 N⋅m (454 lb⋅ft)	142 km (88 mi)	185 km (115 mi)	1,412 km (877 mi)	18 min	1,948 kg (4,295 lb)
30.32 kWh	243 kg (536 lb)	355 hp (265 kW; 360 PS)	615 N⋅m (454 lb⋅ft)	156 km (97 mi)	220 km (137 mi)	1,505 km (935 mi)	18 min	1,958 kg (4,317 lb)

== Sales ==
Year	China	
Year	Haoji	L8
2022	21,463	—
2023	11,125	—
2024	6,807	—
2025	3,722	8,758
