= Dongfeng Fengdu MX3 =

Subcompact crossover SUV

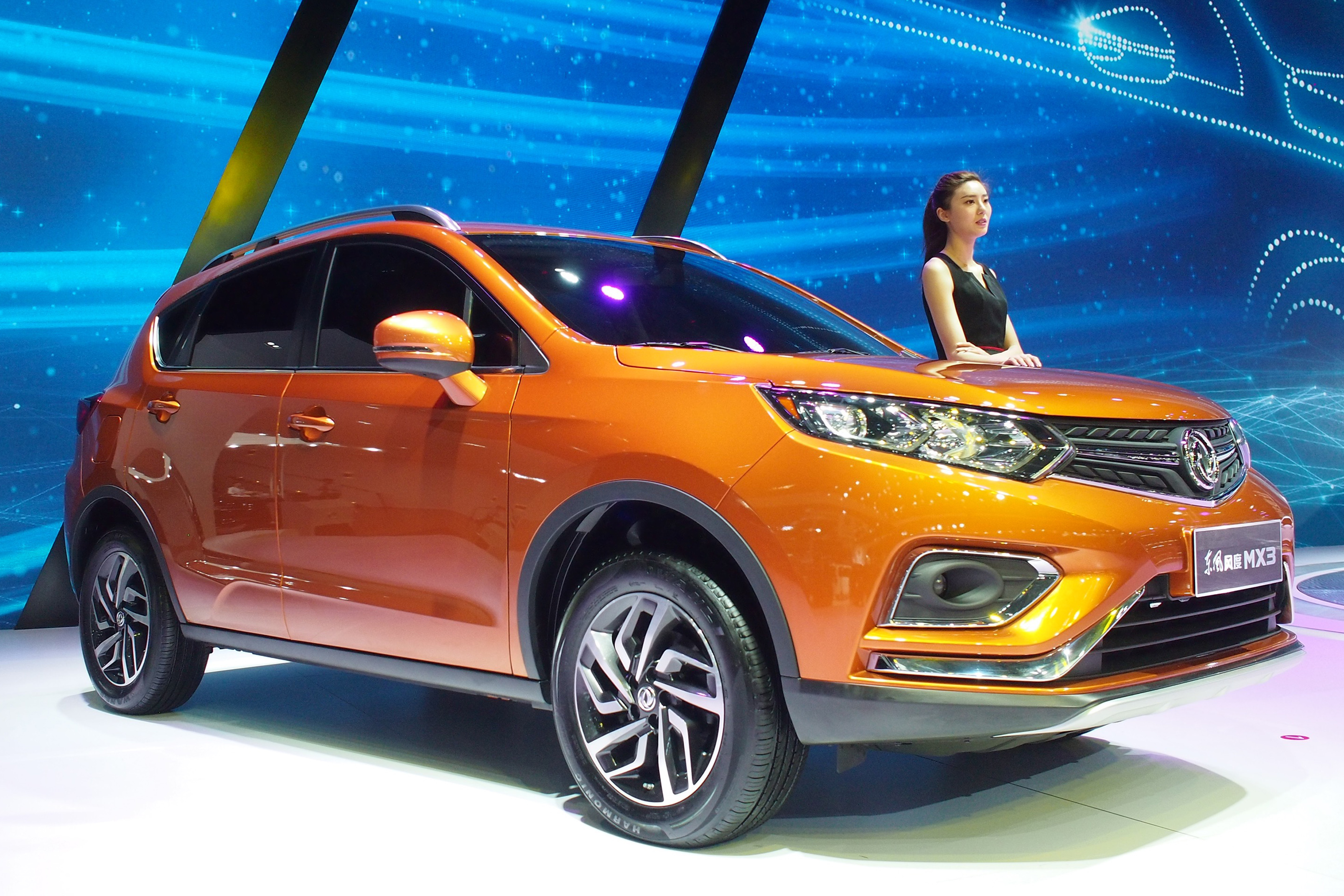

Overview
- Production: 2017 (cancelled)

Body and chassis
- Layout: Front-engine, front-wheel-drive
- Related: Aeolus AX5

Powertrain
- Engine: 1.6 L DFMA16 I4; 1.4 L DFMA14T turbo I4
- Transmission: 5-speed manual 6 speed dual-clutch

Dimensions
- Wheelbase: 2,630 mm (103.5 in)
- Length: 4,506 mm (177.4 in)
- Width: 1,806 mm (71.1 in)
- Height: 1,642 mm (64.6 in)

The Dongfeng Fengdu MX3 is a compact crossover SUV produced by Dongfeng Motor Corporation under the Dongfeng Fengdu sub-brand.

== Overview ==
The MX3 debuted during the 2017 Auto Shanghai with the MX3 being available to the market in June 2017 with prices ranging from 55,000 yuan to 65,000 yuan. It is effectively an Aeolus AX5 with restyled front and rear sections.

It will be equipped with either 122 hp (91 kW; 124 PS) 1.6-liter naturally aspirated or 122 hp (91 kW; 124 PS) 1.4-liter turbocharged engines, paired with either a 5-speed manual or 6-speed dual-clutch transmission. It has a top speed of 170 km/h (106 mph).

The MX3 never entered production due to Dongfeng undergoing a brand streamlining caused by poor sales, and the restyled body panels were instead used in the mid-cycle refresh of the Aeolus AX5.
