= Aeolus Haohan =

Compact SUV

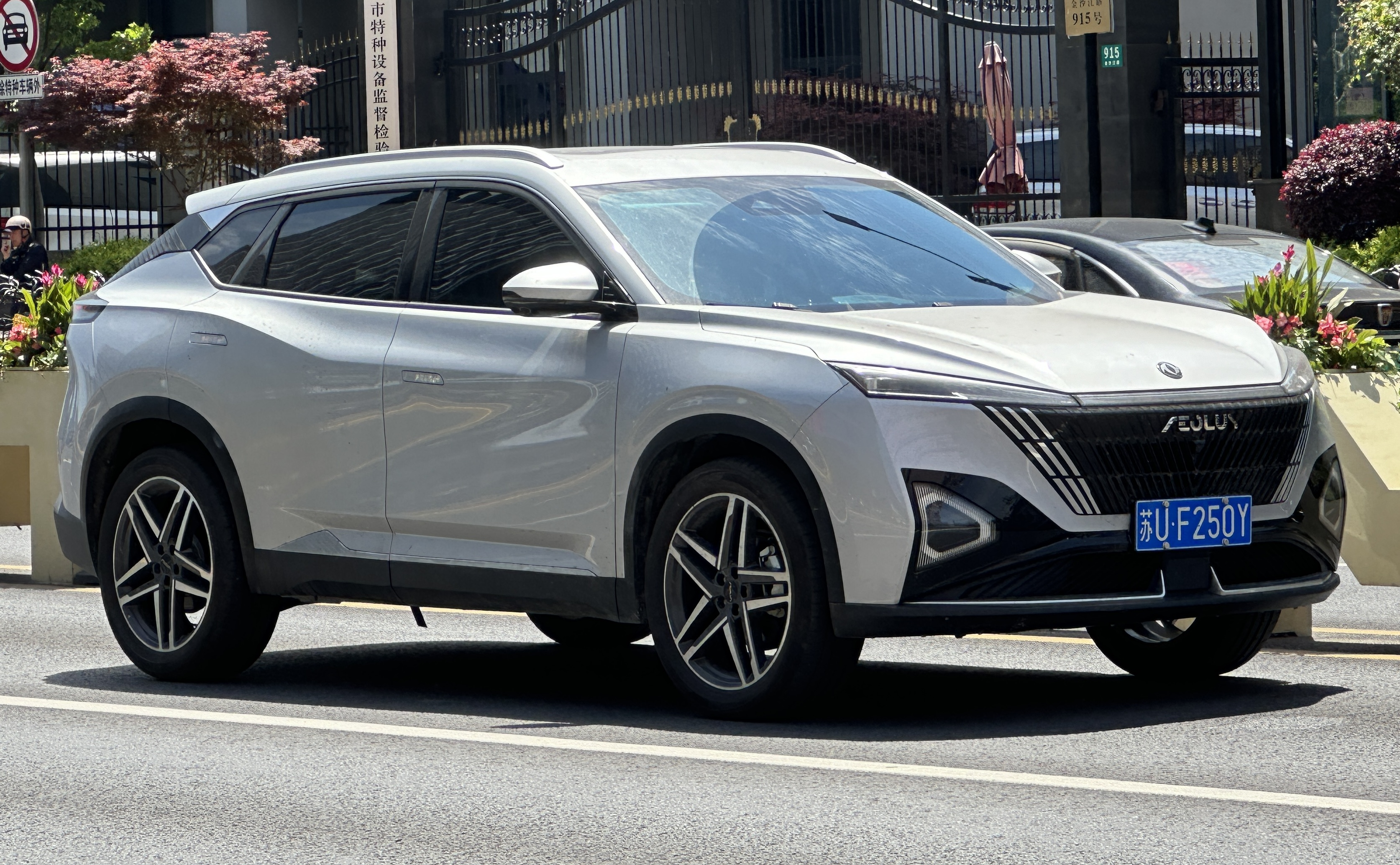

Overview
- Manufacturer: Aeolus (Dongfeng Motor Corporation)
- Also called: Dongfeng Mage (export); Aeolus L7 (plug-in hybrid version); Aeolus L8Y (2026–present); Aeolus Sky EV01 (electric version); Hedmos 06 (Fukang version); GTV Kessor Pro (Cambodia)
- Production: 2023–present
- Assembly: China: Wuhan

Body and chassis
- Class: Compact SUV (C)
- Body style: 5-door SUV
- Layout: Front engine, front-wheel-drive
- Platform: DSMA 2.0 platform
- Related: Aeolus Haoji

Powertrain
- Engine: Petrol hybrid: DFMC15TE3 1.5 L I4 turbo; Petrol plug-in hybrid: 1.5 L I4 turbo
- Transmission: 7-speed DCT; 4-speed DHT (Haohan DH-i); 4-speed DHT + CVT (L7)
- Electric range: 445–520 km (277–323 mi) (Sky EV01)

Dimensions
- Wheelbase: 2,775 mm (109 in)
- Length: 4,650 mm (183 in)
- Width: 1,905 mm (75 in)
- Height: 1,630 mm (64 in)

The Aeolus Haohan (风神 皓瀚, also called Dongfeng Mage in export markets), is a compact SUV produced by Dongfeng Motor Corporation under the Aeolus sub-brand. The Haohan compact SUV is built on the DSMA 2.0 platform developed by Dongfeng for conventional petrol and electric models. The Dongfeng announced that Haohan is the world's first vehicle that equipped with a four-speed power-split + series-parallel hybrid system.

== Overview ==
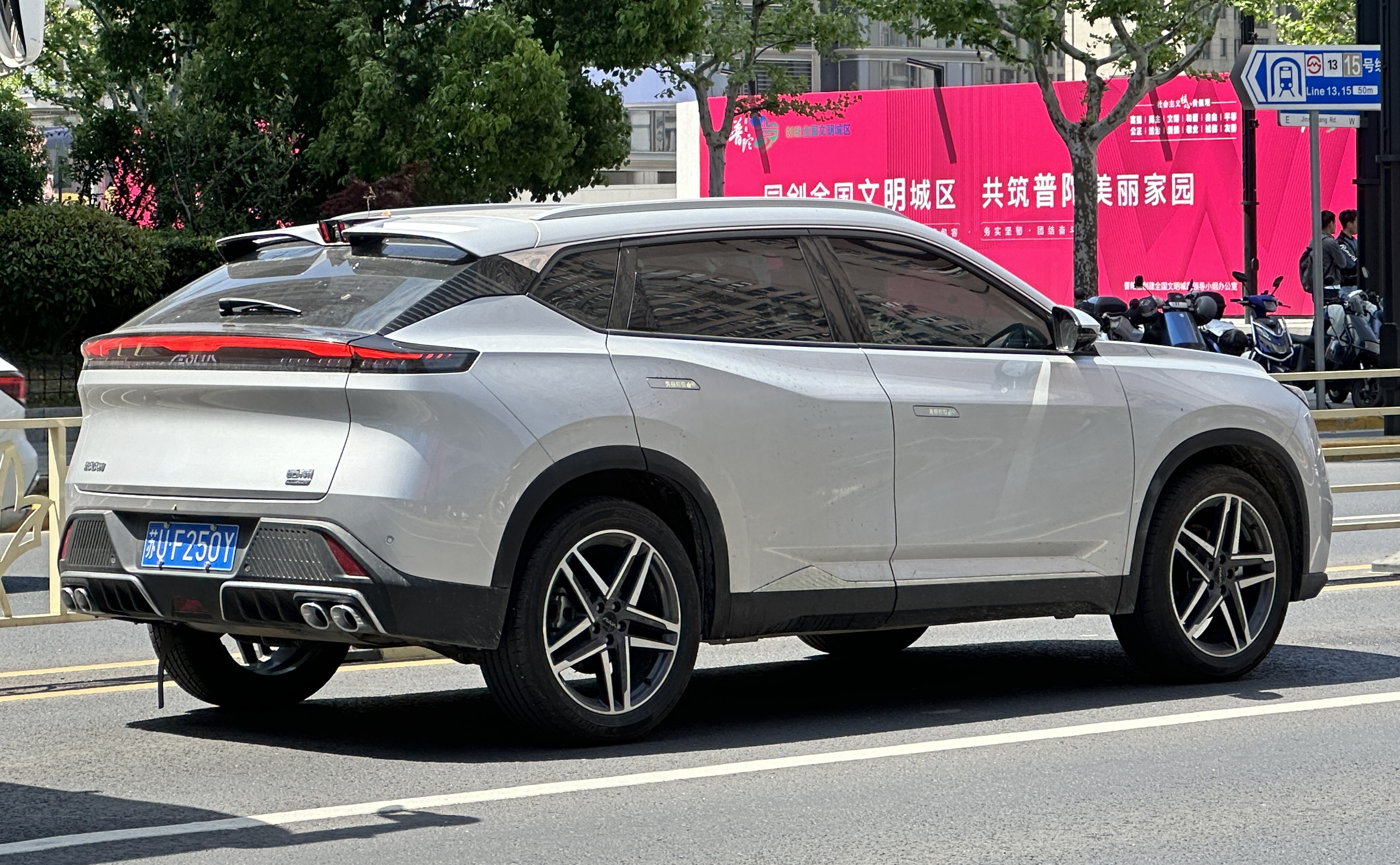
Rear view

The Haohan is the first vehicle equipped with Dongfeng "Mach DH-i" technology, and uses a power-split + series-parallel hybrid system. The Haohan equips with hybrid-dedicated turbo petrol 1.5 liter engine that reaches thermal efficiency of 45.18%. The HEV model delivers 215 kW (288 hp; 292 PS) of combined power and 565 N⋅m (417 lb⋅ft) of torque. The PHEV model offers a higher combined power of 265 kW (355 hp; 360 PS) and 615 N⋅m (454 lb⋅ft) of torque.

The Haohan 4-speed series-parallel dual motor system, and can work together with the 1.5 liter turbo engine when the vehicle exceeds the speed of 110 km/h (68 mph). The Haohan can reach 1,300 km (810 mi) of range as claimed by Dongfeng.

== Aeolus L7 and L8Y ==
The Aeolus L7 was originally named Aeolus Haohan PHEV, and is essentially the PHEV version of the Haohan. The PHEV system includes a 1.5 liter turbo engine codenamed DFMC15TE3 developing 154 hp (115 kW; 156 PS). The Aeolus L7 would feature the Mach PHREV technology by Dongfeng. The system features one planetary gearset, two sets of fixed-axis gears, and two synchronizers, allowing it to achieve multi-gear series-parallel and dual-mode power split. The result is a diverse use of hybrid systems with different modes including plug-in hybrid electric, range extended electric, and pure electric driving modes.

A variant named as the Aeolus L8Y is launched in August 2026. Essentially being a rebadged L7.

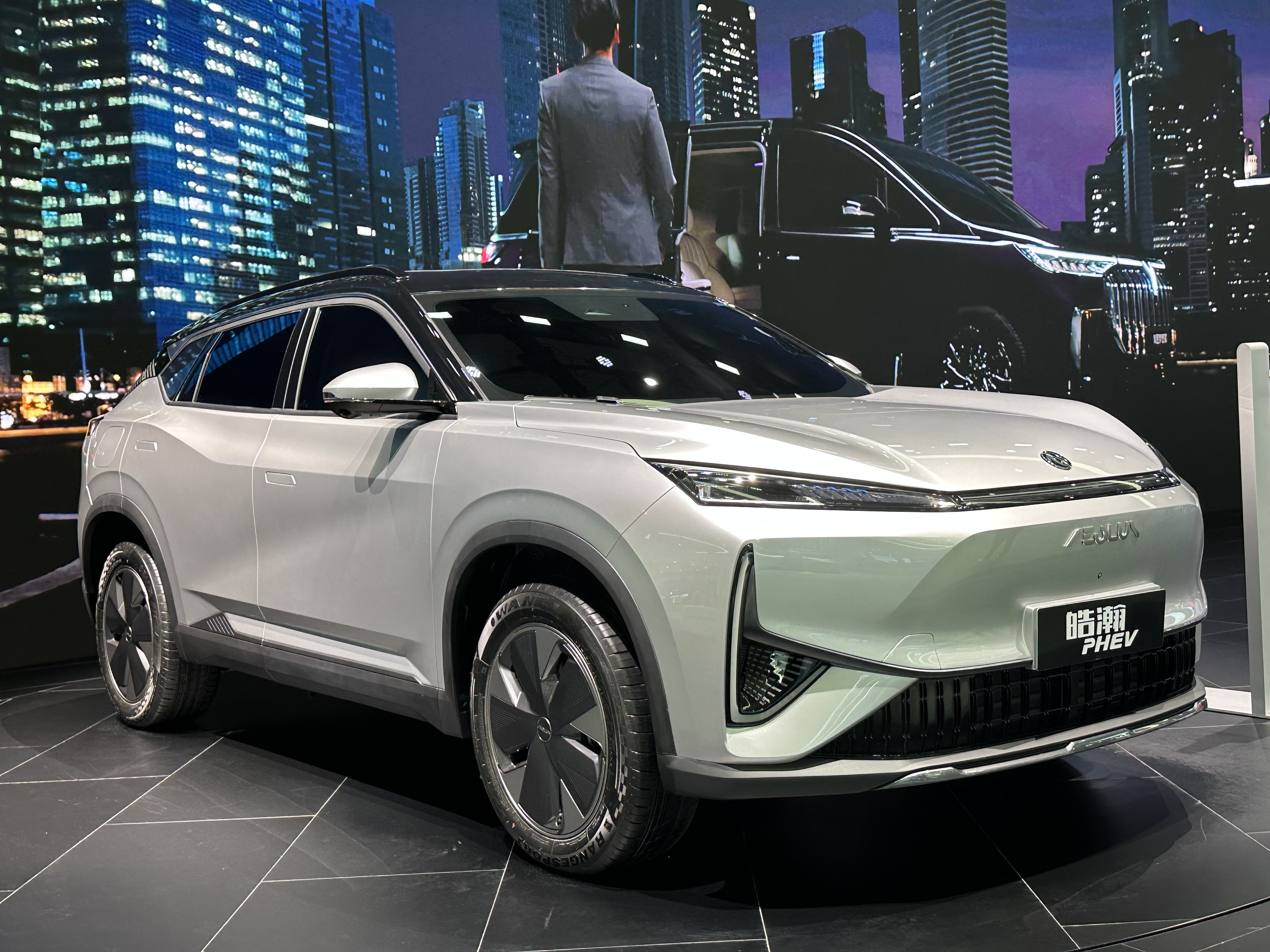
Aeolus L7

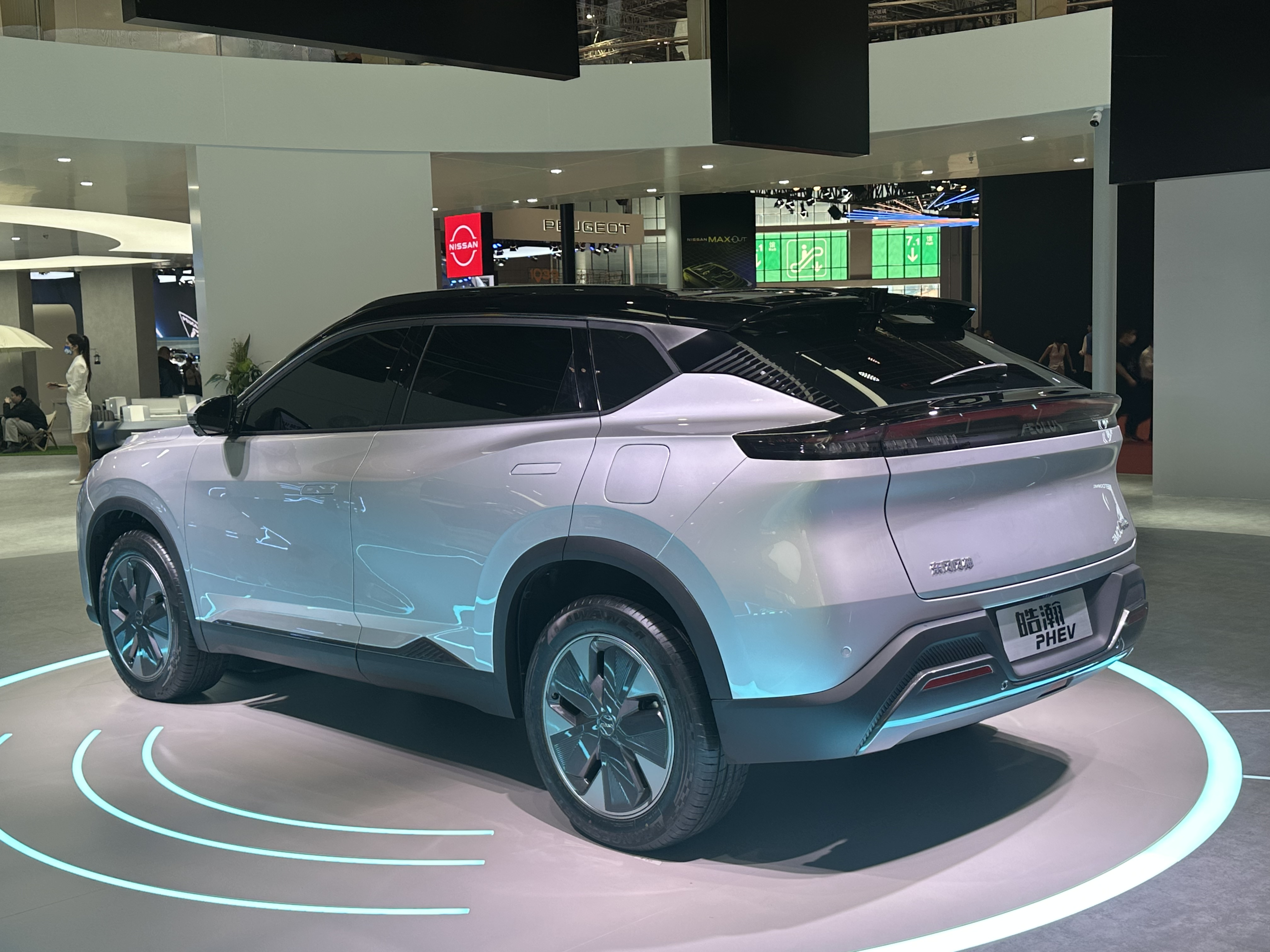
Rear view

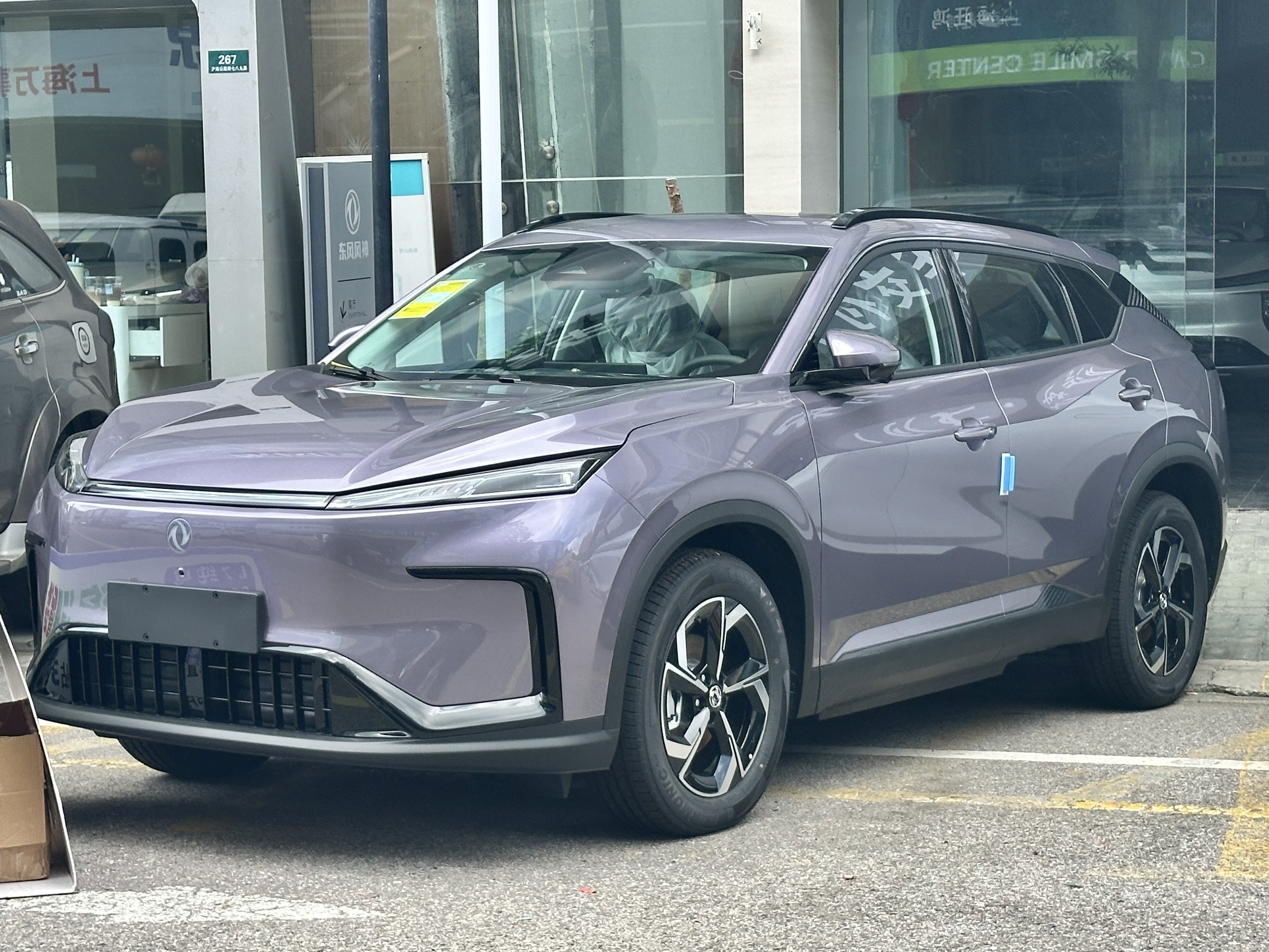
Aeolus L8Y

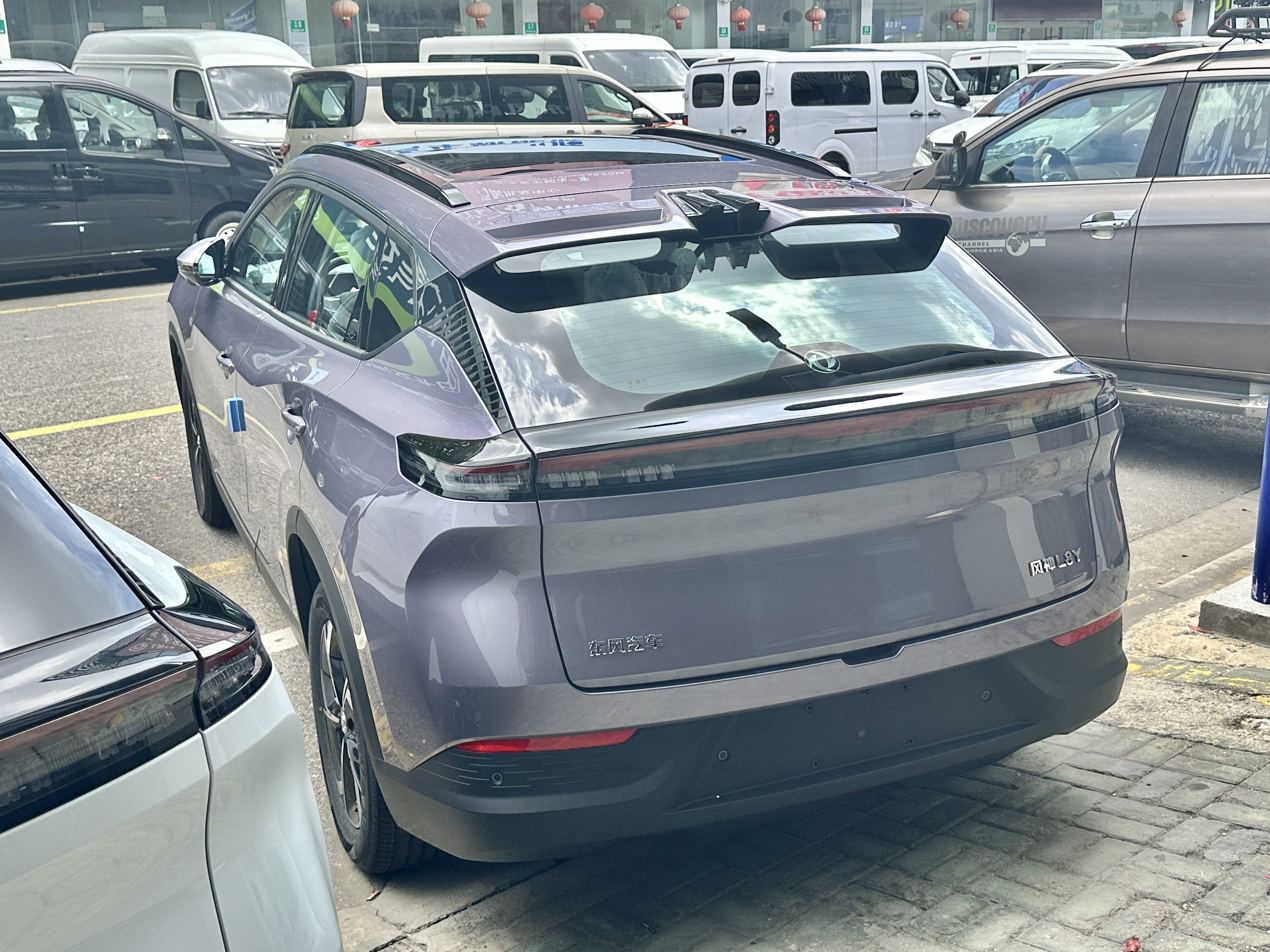
Rear view

== Aeolus Sky EV01 ==
The Aeolus Sky EV01 is an battery electric SUV based on the Haohan, launched in October 2023. The Sky EV01 is claimed to be built on the Mach-E aluminum lightweight platform, featuring a square CTP (cell-to-pack) battery with a range of 445 km (277 mi) or 520 km (320 mi). It is powered by an electric motor that produces a maximum power output of 160 kW (210 hp; 220 PS), a peak torque of 310 N⋅m (230 lb⋅ft), and can accelerate from 0 to 100 km/h (62 mph) in 6.9 seconds, with an energy consumption of 12.8 kWh/100 km (62 mi). The drag coefficient of the Sky EV01 is 0.3 Cd. Additionally, the platform supports DC fast charging, allowing the vehicle to gain 100 km (62 mi) of range in just 8 minutes, while charging the battery from 30% to 80% takes 28 minutes.

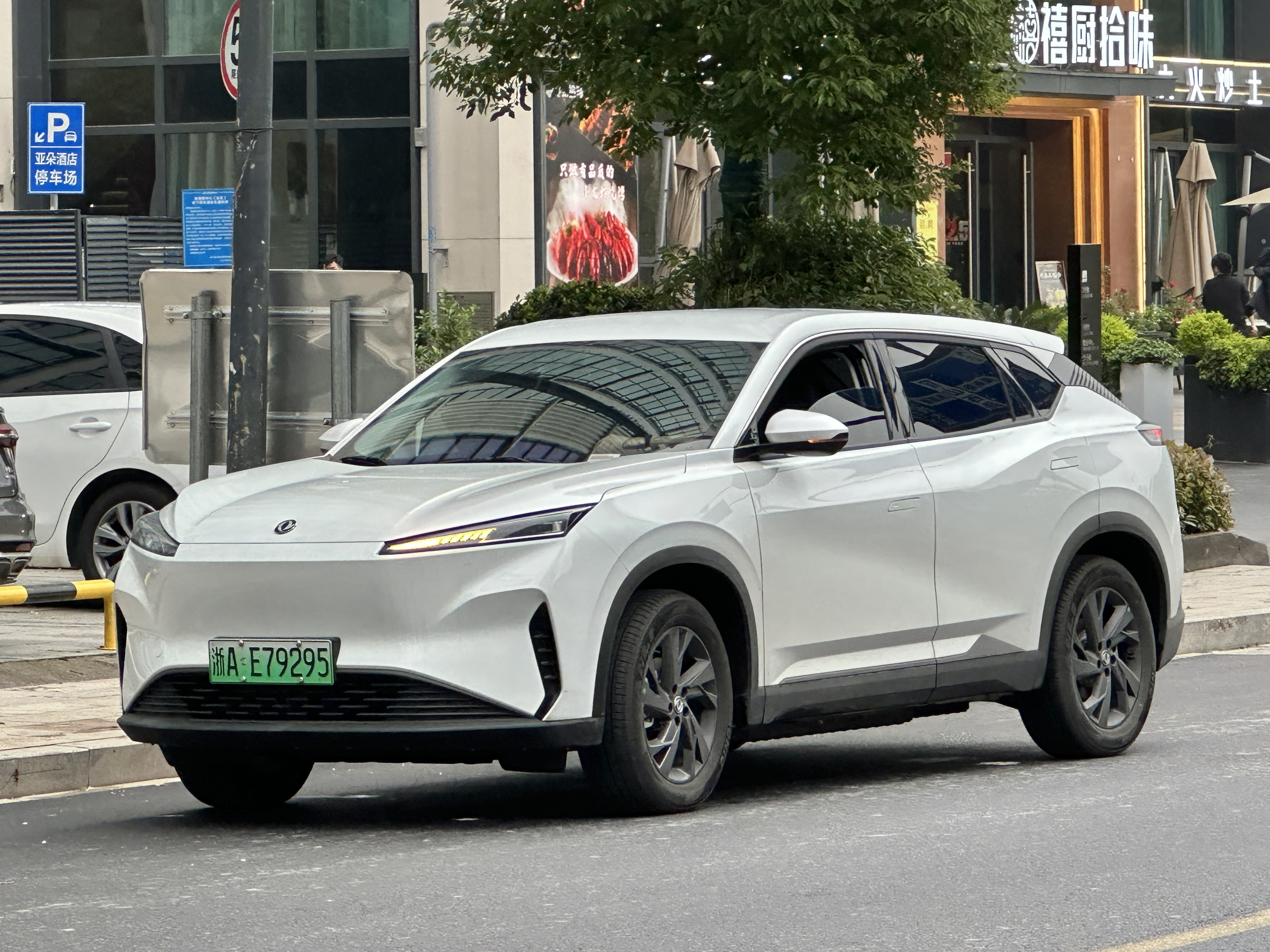
Aeolus Sky EV01

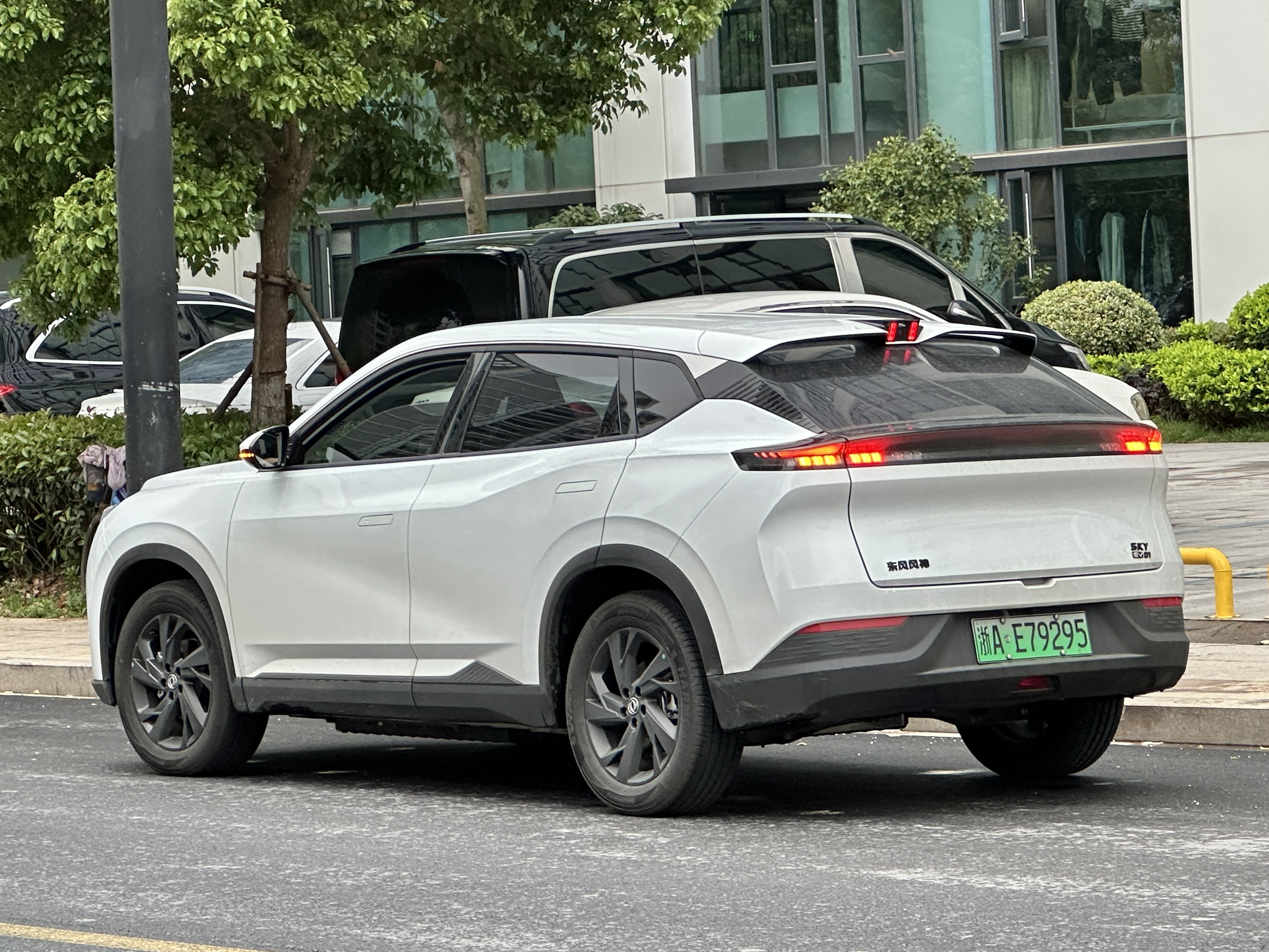
Rear view

== Sales ==
Year	China		
Year	Haohan	L7	Sky EV01
2023	11,574	—	1,009
2024	13,410	12,218	16,172
2025	2,883	14,142	29,310
