= Aeolus AX7 =

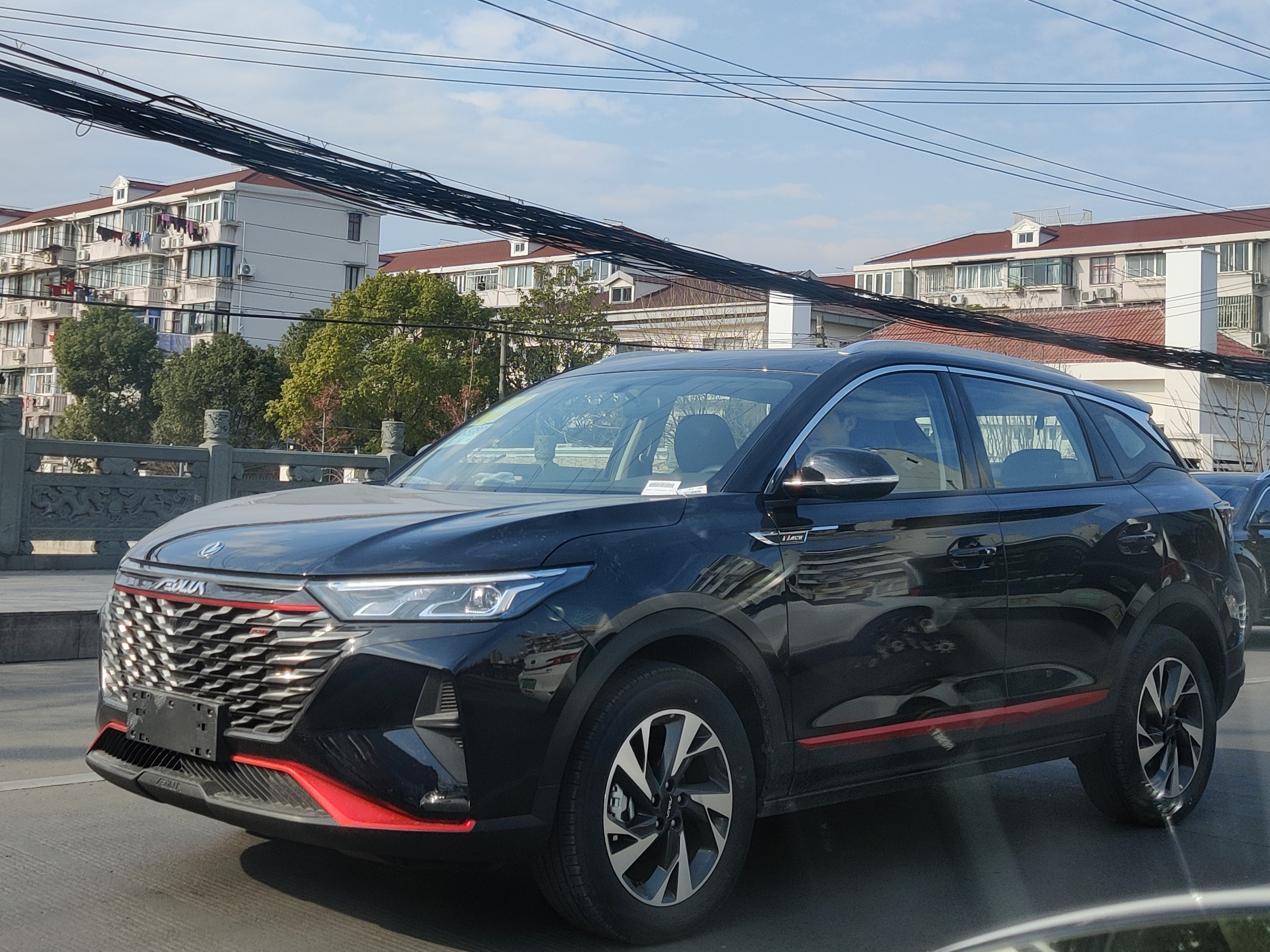

Overview
- Manufacturer: Aeolus (marque)
- Production: 2014–2025
- Model years: 2014–2025
- Assembly: China: Wuhan

Body and chassis
- Class: Compact crossover SUV
- Body style: 5-door SUV
- Layout: front engine, front-wheel drive / all-wheel drive

The Aeolus AX7, previously the Dongfeng Fengshen AX7 is a compact crossover SUV produced by Dongfeng Motor Corporation under the Aeolus sub-brand from 2014 to 2025.

Starting from the 2021 model year, the Aeolus AX7 was sold with the Aeolus name badge instead of the Dongfeng logo. The updated model was called the Aeolus AX7 Pro and features restyled front and rear end designs. For the 2022 model year, the model was called the Aeolus AX7 Plus and features a further revised front bumper based on the AX7 Pro design.

== First generation (2014) ==
Aeolus AX7
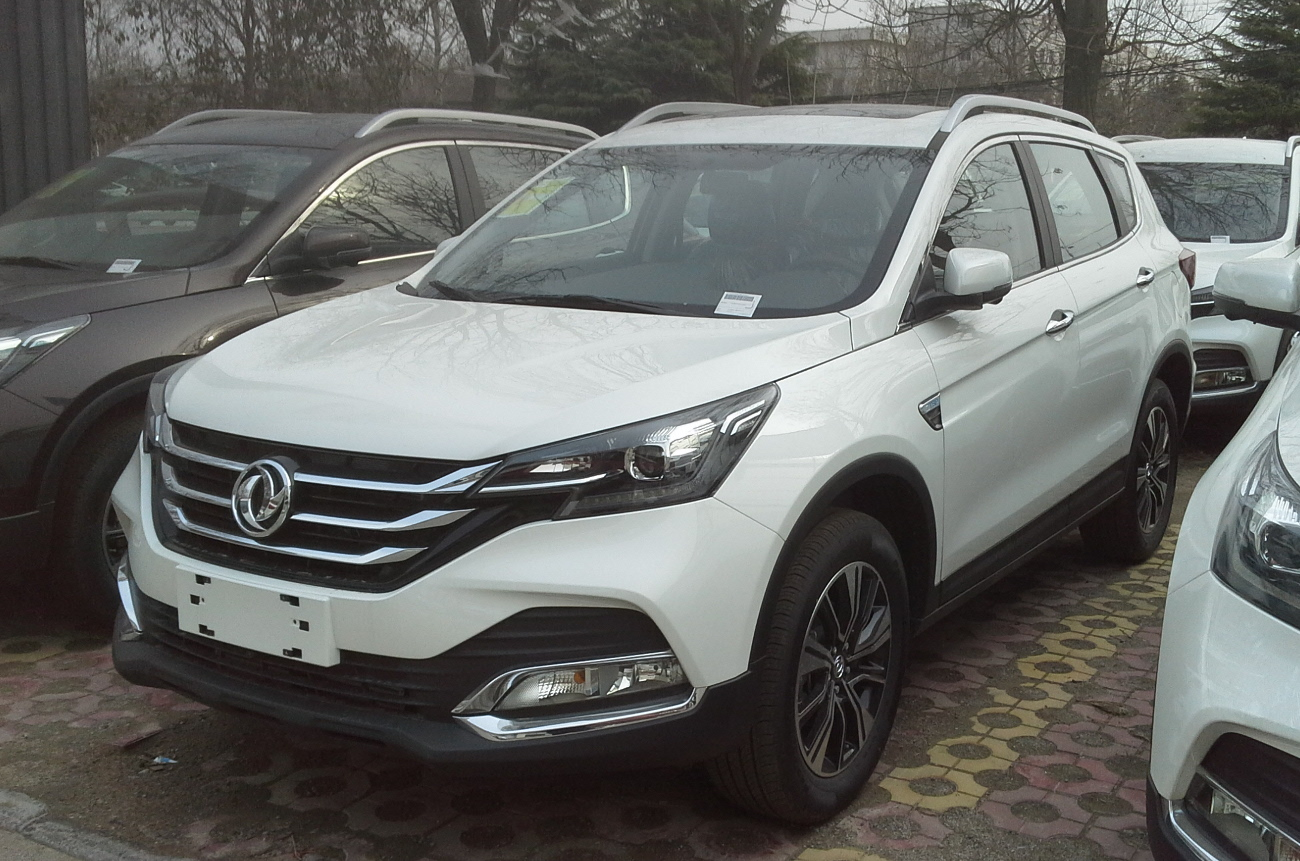

Overview
- Production: 2014–2019
- Assembly: China: Wuhan

Body and chassis
- Layout: Front-engine, front-wheel-drive
- Related: Dongfeng Fengdu MX5

Powertrain
- Engine: 1.4 L DFN A14T I4 Turbo (petrol); 1.6 L EP6FDTM I4 Turbo (petrol); 2.0 L RFN (10LH3X) I4 (petrol); 2.3 L 3FY (10XP01) I4 (petrol)
- Transmission: 5-speed manual 6-speed automatic CVT

Dimensions
- Wheelbase: 2,712 mm (106.8 in)
- Length: 4,690 mm (184.6 in)
- Width: 1,850 mm (72.8 in)
- Height: 1,730 mm (68.1 in)

The first generation Aeolus AX7 CUV debuted during the 2014 Beijing Auto Show with the Fengshen AX7 being available to the market in October 2014 with prices ranging from 115,700 yuan to 149,700 yuan.

The AX7 is available with two inline-four petrol engines, including a 2.0-litre engine producing 143 hp (105 kW) and 189 N⋅m (139 lb⋅ft) mated to a 5-speed manual transmission or a CVT, and a 2.3-litre engine producing 173 hp (127 kW) and 220 N⋅m (162 lb⋅ft) mated to a 6-speed automatic transmission.

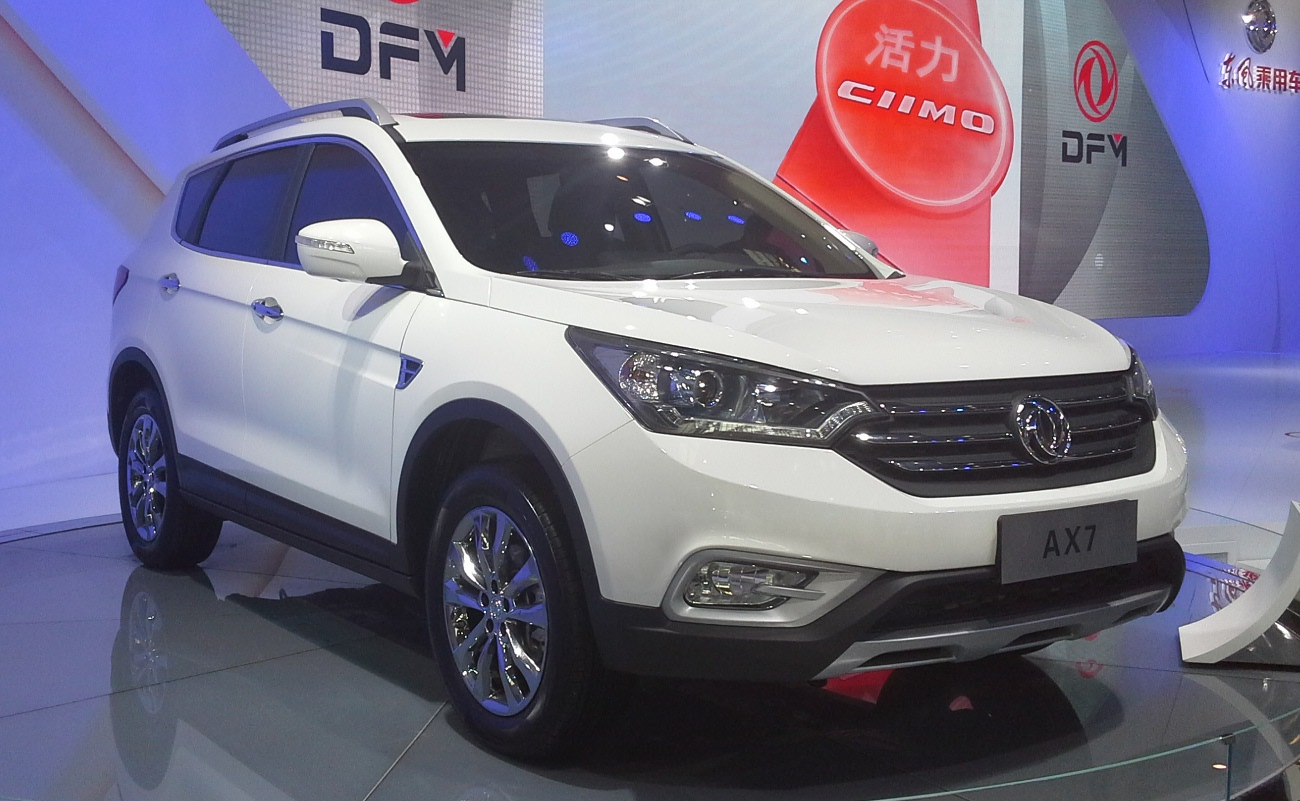
Dongfeng Fengshen AX7

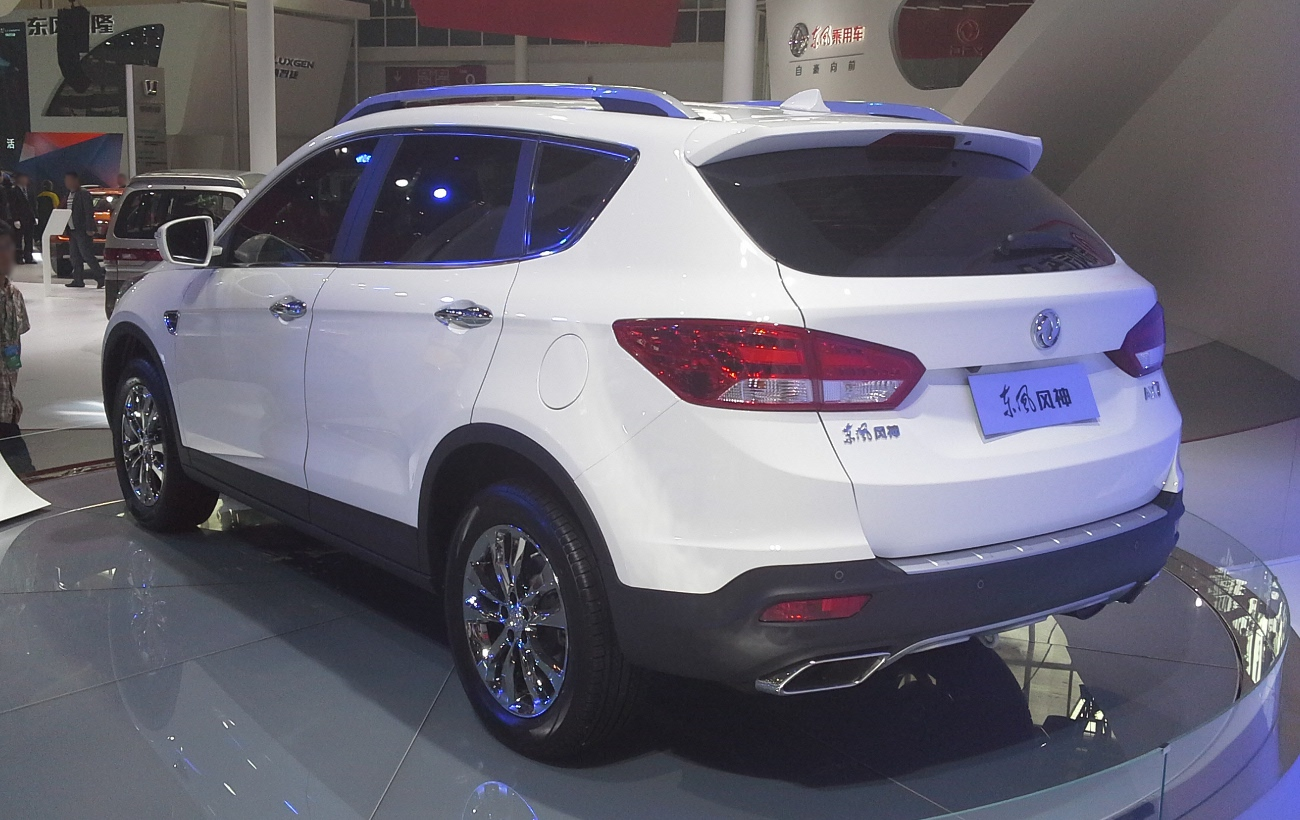
Dongfeng Fengshen AX7

=== 2018 facelift ===
A facelift was revealed during the 2018 Beijing Auto Show changing the styling on the front and the rear of the Fengshen AX7.

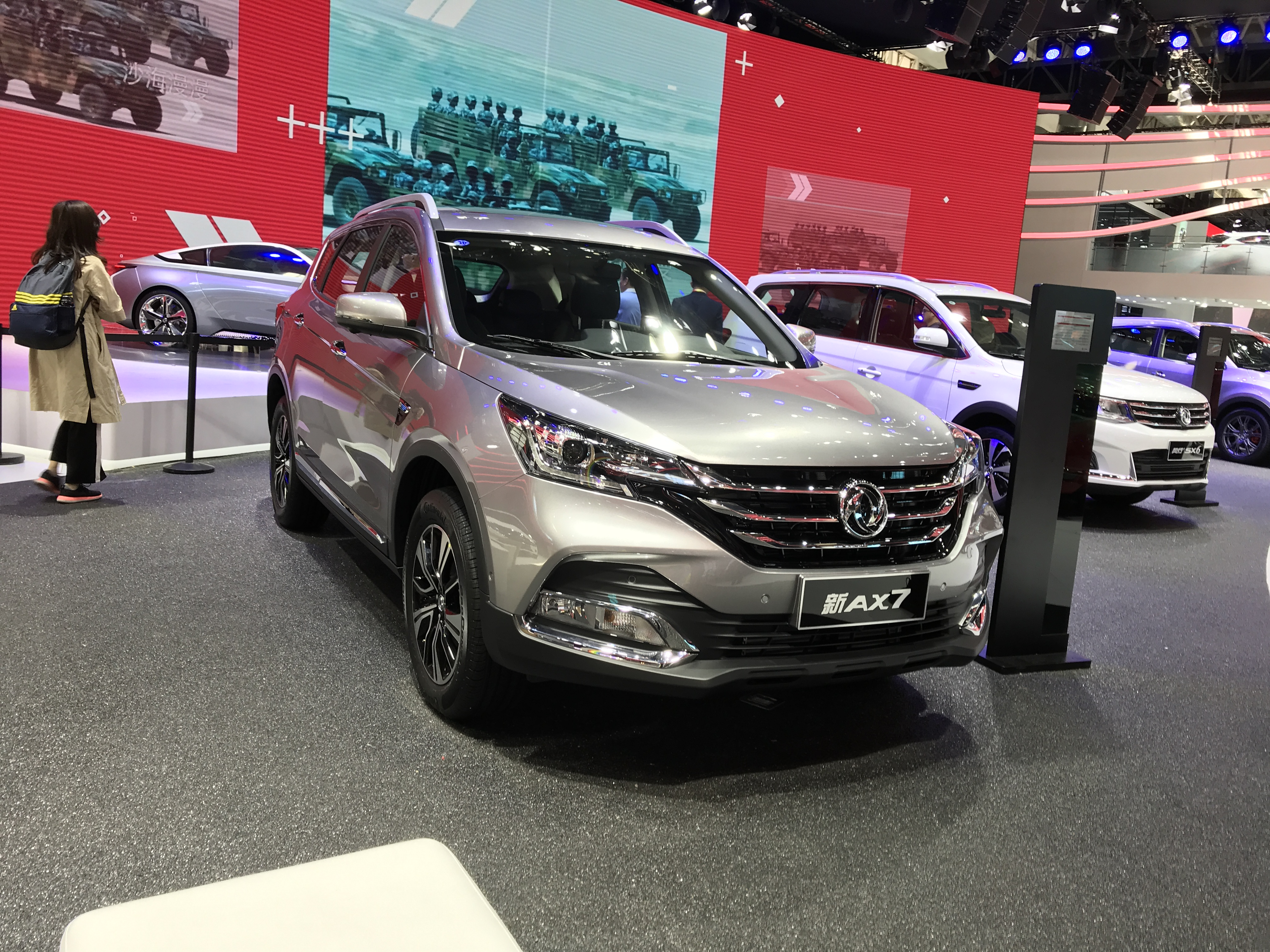
Dongfeng Fengshen AX7 facelift

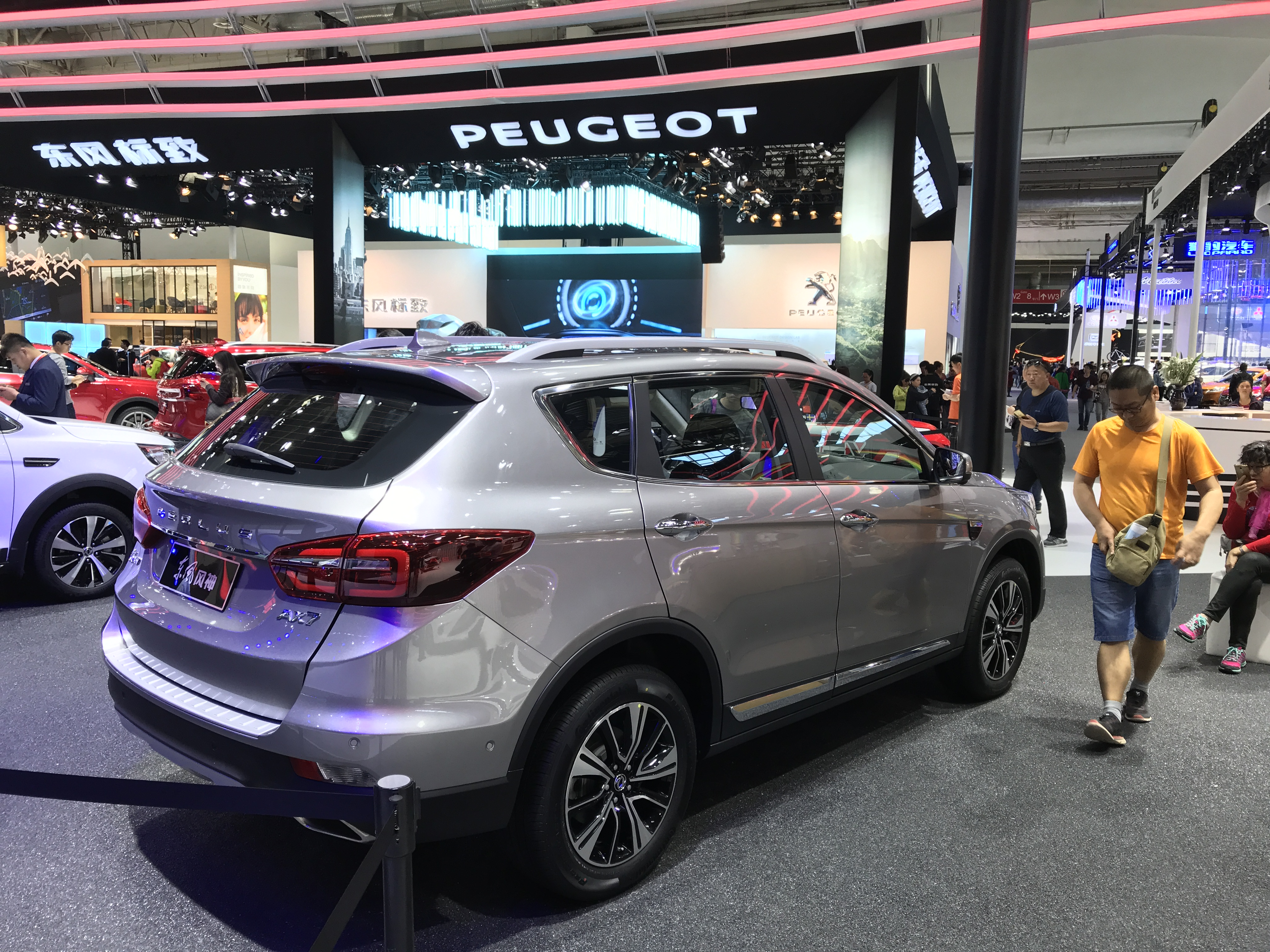
Dongfeng Fengshen AX7 facelift

=== Dongfeng Fengdu MX5 ===
Dongfeng Fengdu MX5
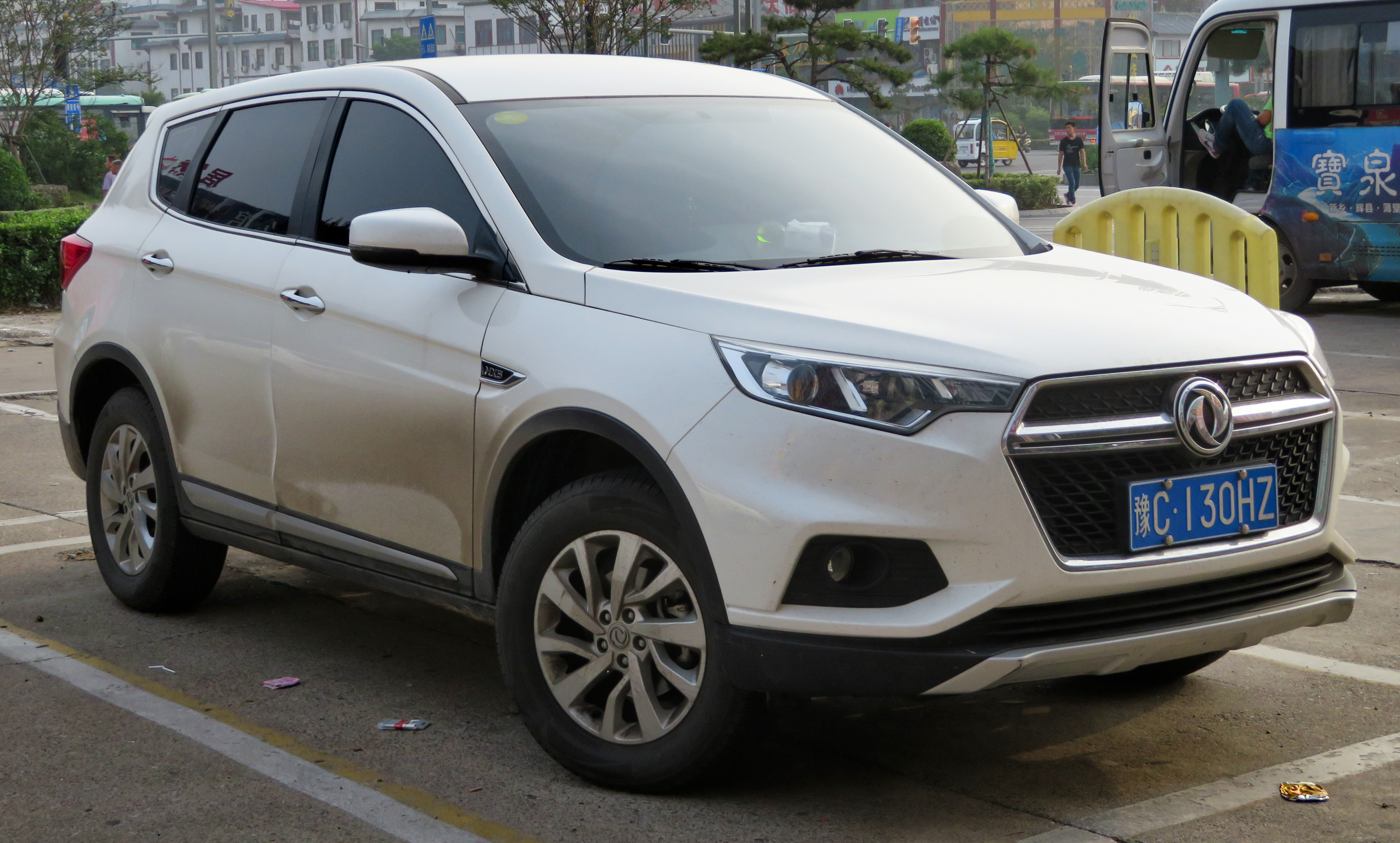

Overview
- Production: 2016–2017
- Assembly: China: Wuhan

Body and chassis
- Layout: Front-engine, front-wheel-drive
- Related: Dongfeng Fengshen AX7

Powertrain
- Engine: 1.4 L DFM A14T I4 (turbo petrol); 2.0 L PSA RFN 10LH3X I4 (petrol)
- Transmission: 5-speed manual 6 speed automatic CVT

Dimensions
- Wheelbase: 2,712 mm (106.8 in)
- Length: 4,720 mm (185.8 in)
- Width: 1,850 mm (72.8 in)
- Height: 1,727 mm (68.0 in)

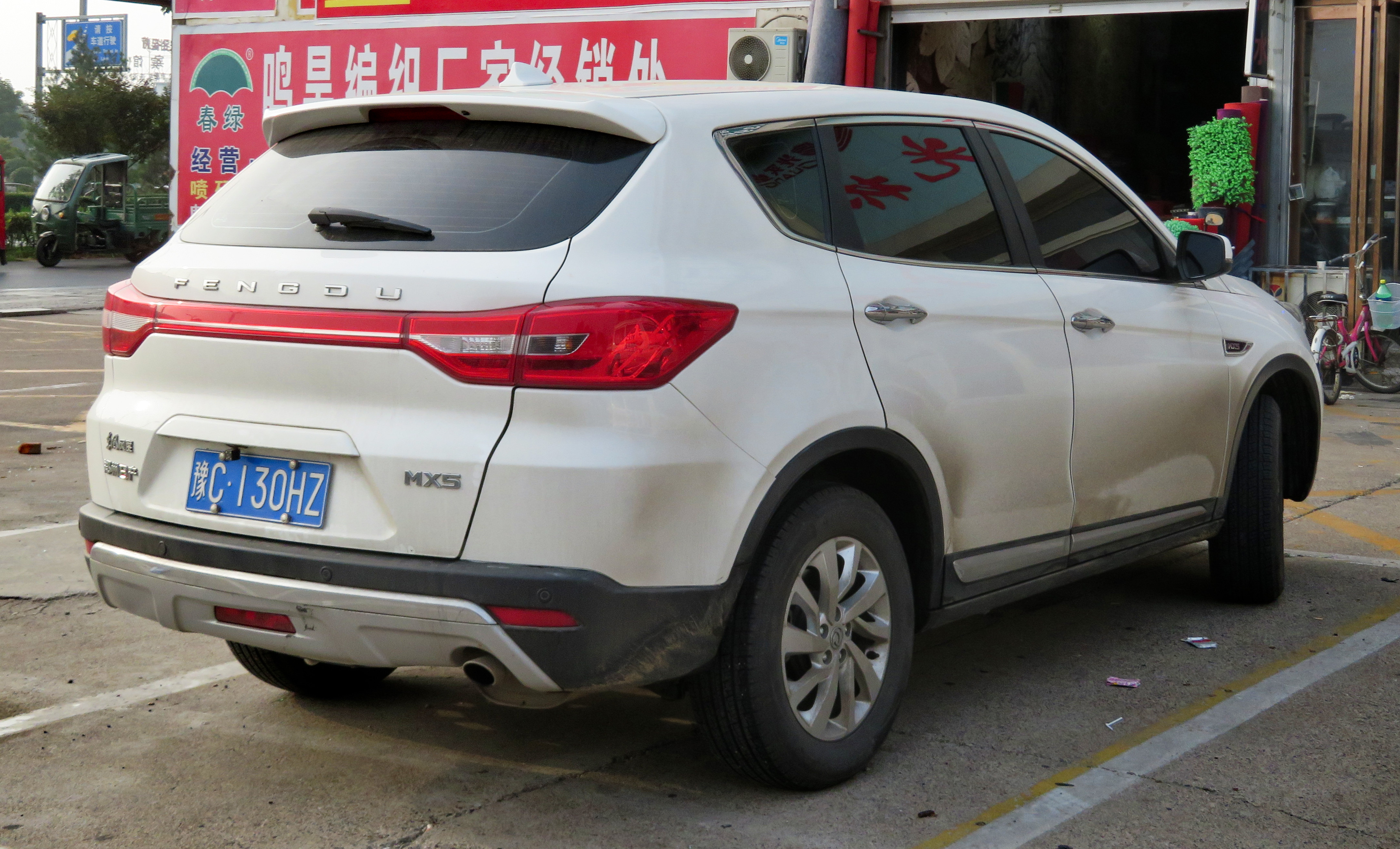
Dongfeng Fengdu MX5 rear

The Dongfeng Fengdu MX5 is a compact CUV by Dongfeng Fengdu which debuted during the 2016 Chengdu Auto Show, with the MX5 being available to the market in late 2016 with prices ranging from 103,500 yuan to 135,500 yuan.

==== Platform ====
The Fengdu MX5 shares the same platform with the Fengshen AX7 with only styling changes done to the front and rear DRGs, featuring restyled bumpers, lamps, and tailgate.

==== Powertrain ====
The Fengdu MX5 was available with a 2.0-litre engine with 146 hp (107 kW) and a 1.4-litre turbo engine with 140 hp (103 kW), mated to a six-speed manual transmission or a CVT gearbox.

== Second generation (2018) ==
Aeolus AX7 II
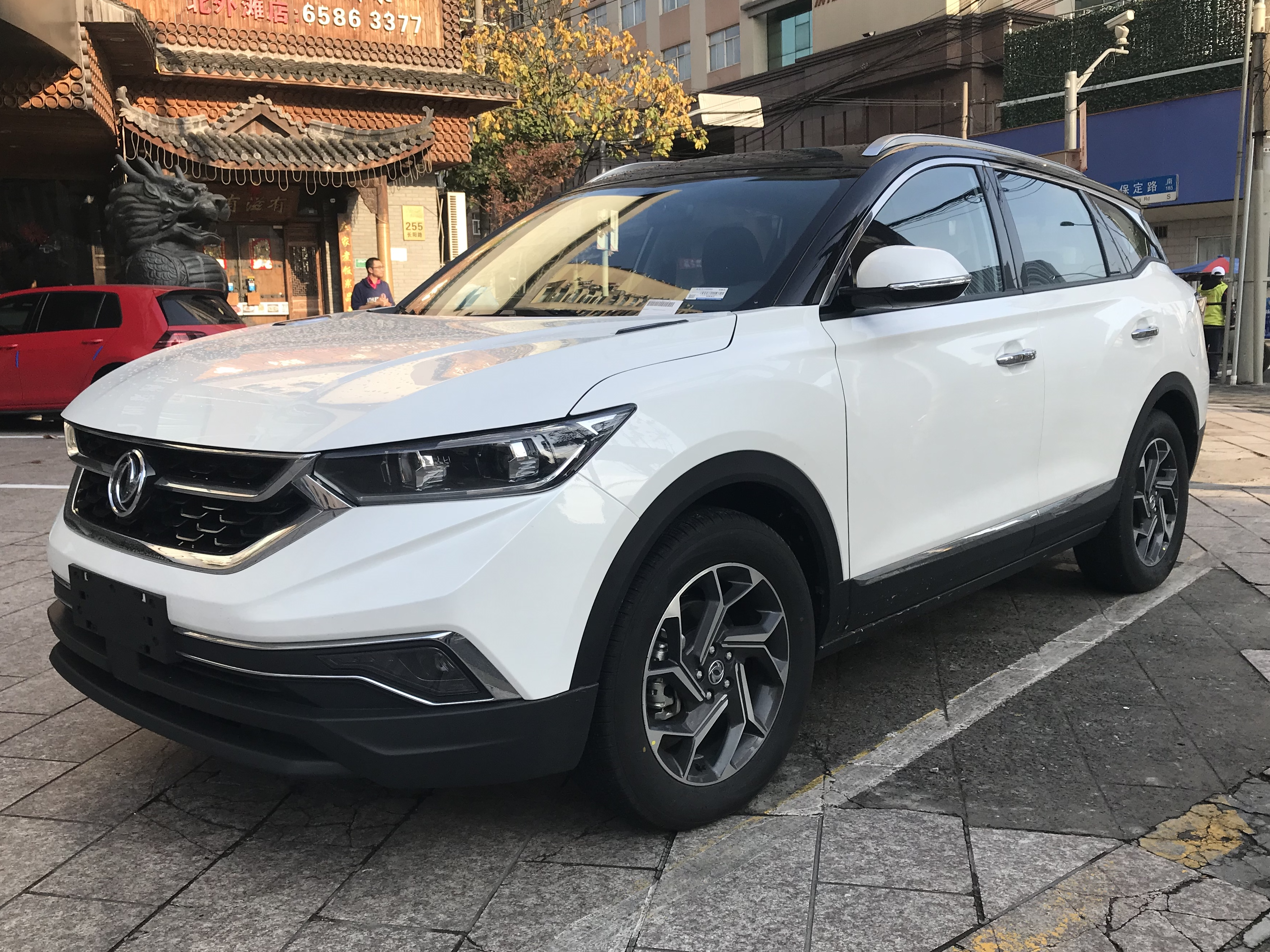

Overview
- Production: 2018–2025
- Assembly: China: Wuhan

Body and chassis
- Layout: Front-engine, front-wheel-drive

Powertrain
- Engine: 1.5 L DFMC15TP1 I4 Turbo (petrol); 1.6 L EP6FDTM I4 Turbo (petrol)
- Transmission: 5-speed manual 6-speed automatic

Dimensions
- Wheelbase: 2,715 mm (106.9 in)
- Length: 4,645 mm (182.9 in); 4,650 mm (183.1 in) (Aeolus AX7 Pro)
- Width: 1,880 mm (74.0 in)
- Height: 1,690 mm (66.5 in)

The second generation Aeolus AX7 was revealed in August 2018 and was available to the Chinese market from September 2018 with prices ranging from 89,800 to 131,800 yuan at launch. The second generation AX7 is powered by a 1.6-litre petrol turbo inline-four engine producing 167 hp (123 kW) and 245 N⋅m (181 lb⋅ft) mated to a 6-speed automatic gearbox provided by Aisin and powering the front wheels.

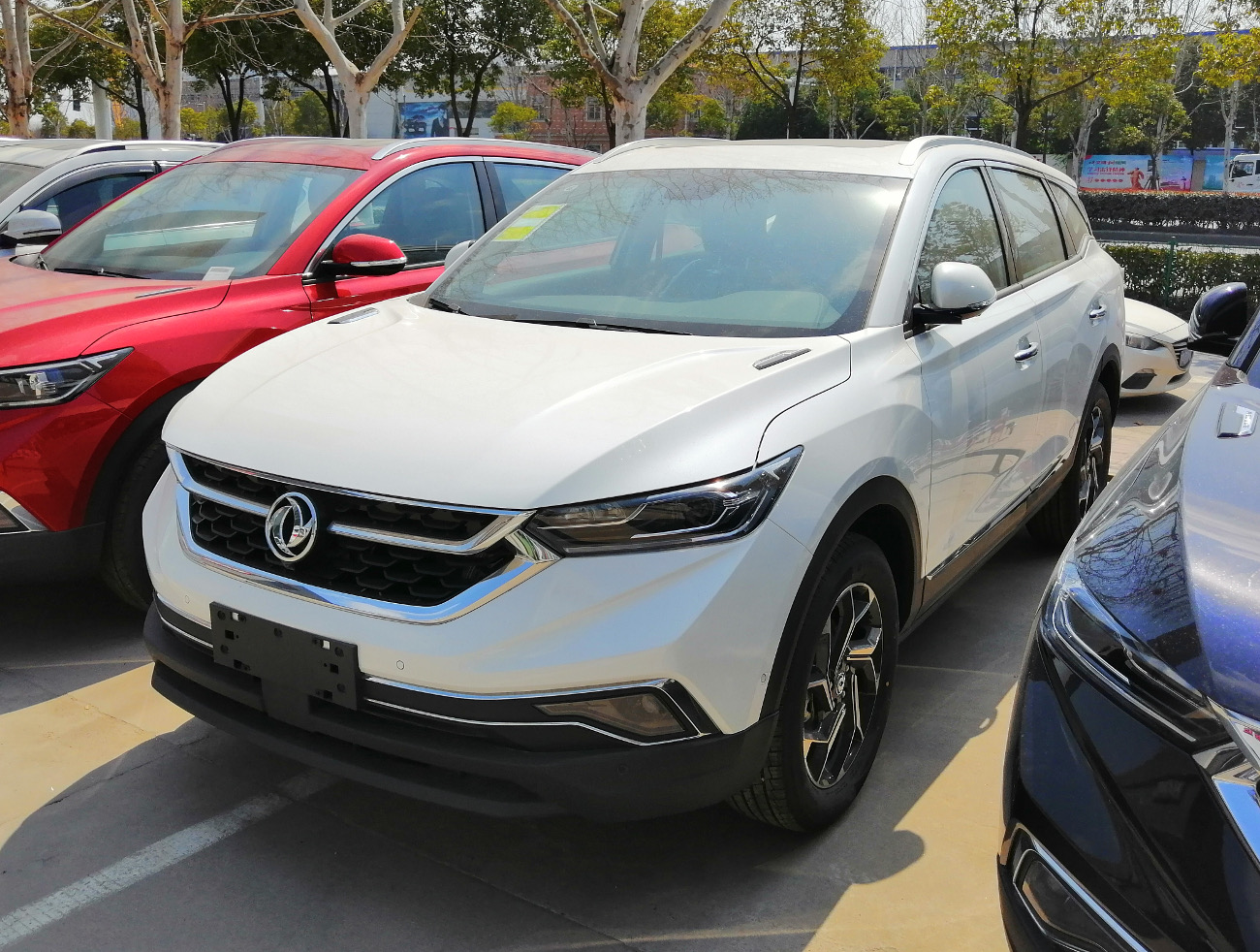
Dongfeng Fengshen AX7 II front

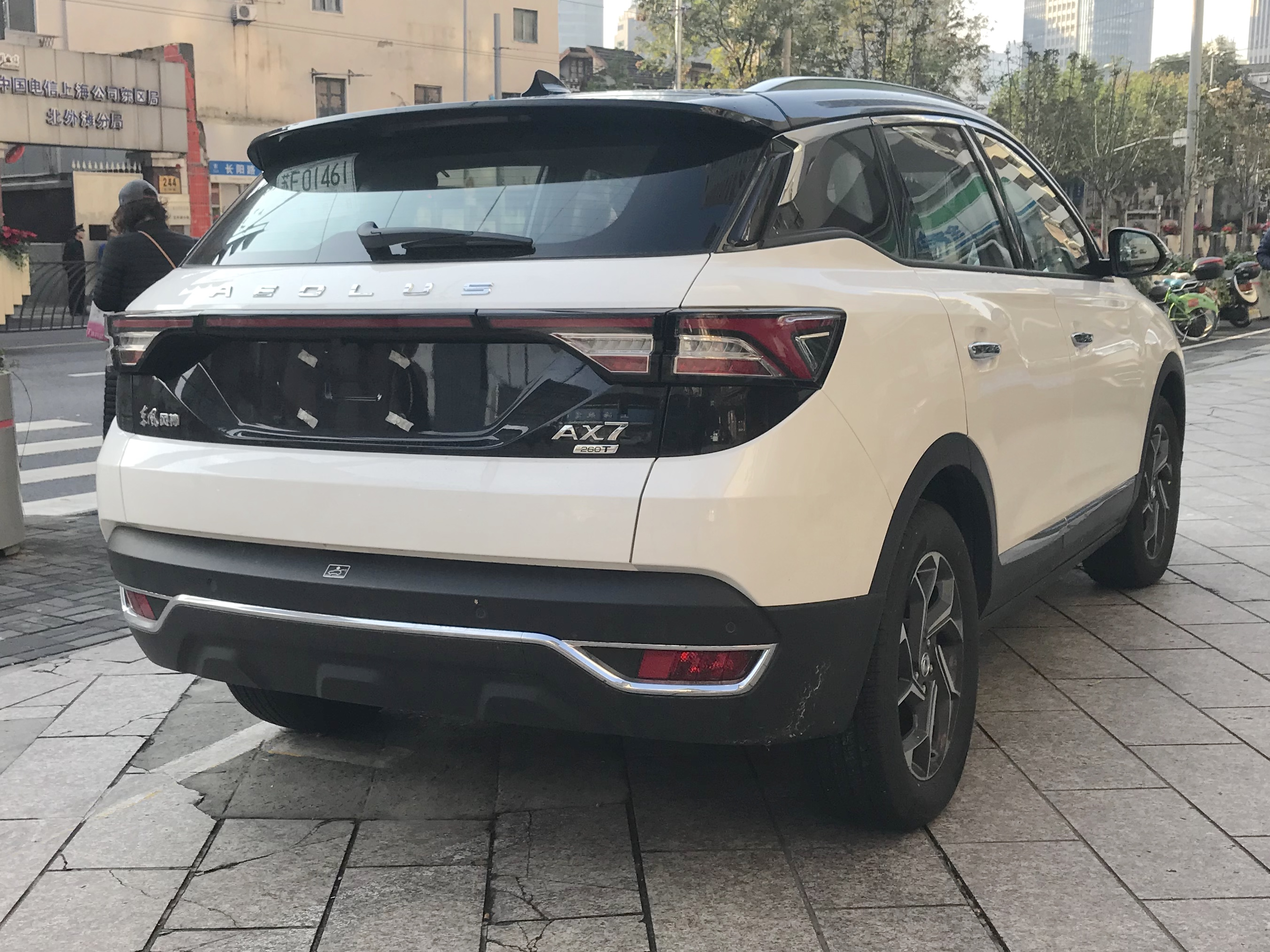
Dongfeng Fengshen AX7 II rear

=== Aeolus AX7 Pro (2021 facelift) ===
A facelift variant called the Aeolus AX7 Pro was launched in September 2020 for the 2021 model year, featuring a redesigned front end while the powertrain remains unchanged. Due to the redesigned front end, the length of the AX7 Pro model has extended by 5 mm (0.2 in) (up to 4,650 mm (183.1 in)) compared to the previous model, the width, height and wheelbase remains. The AX7 Pro interior trim features a two-tone color theme, and the WindLink media center was updated from version 4.0 to version 5.0, with a larger touchscreen size.

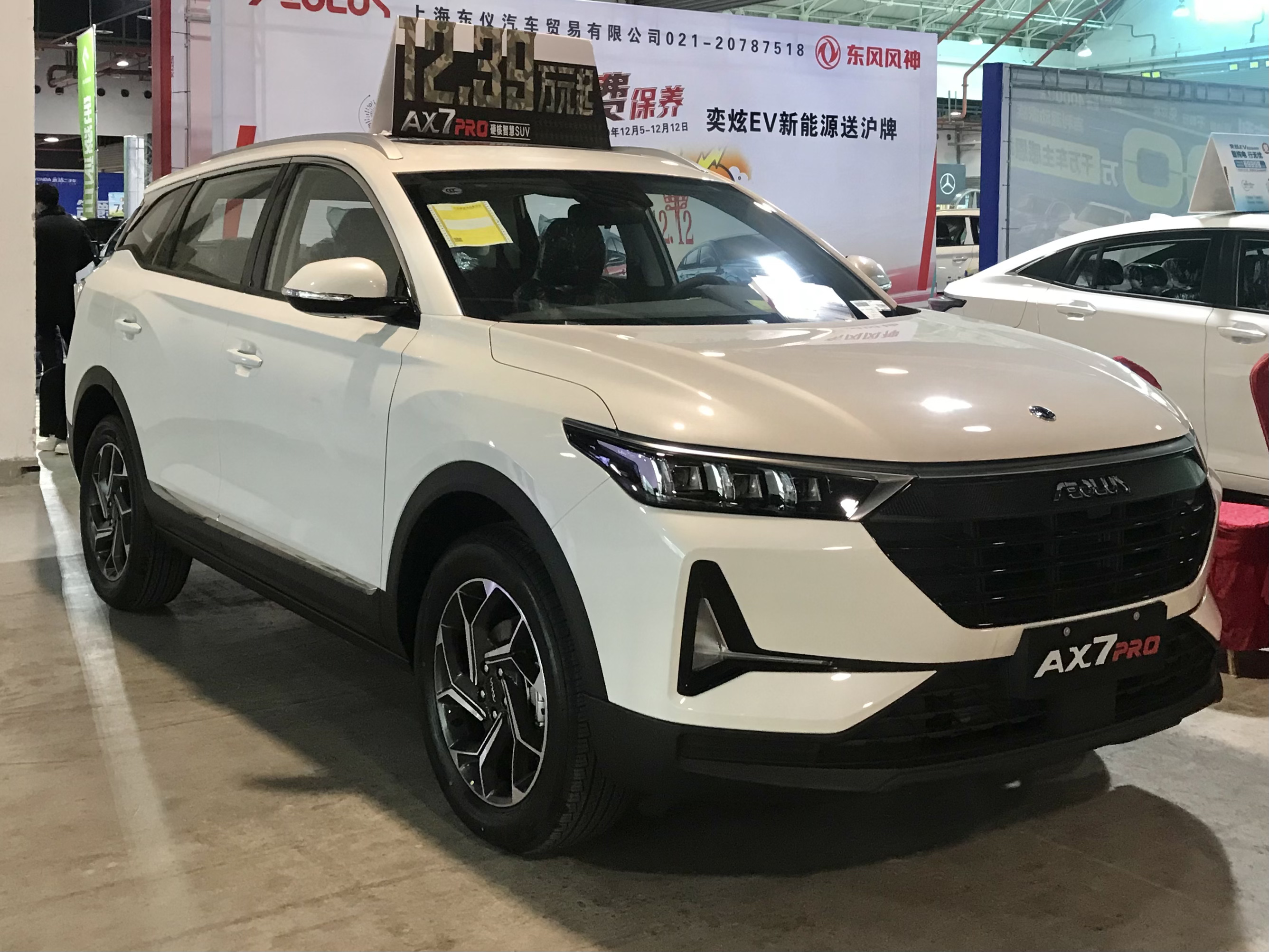
Aeolus AX7 Pro front

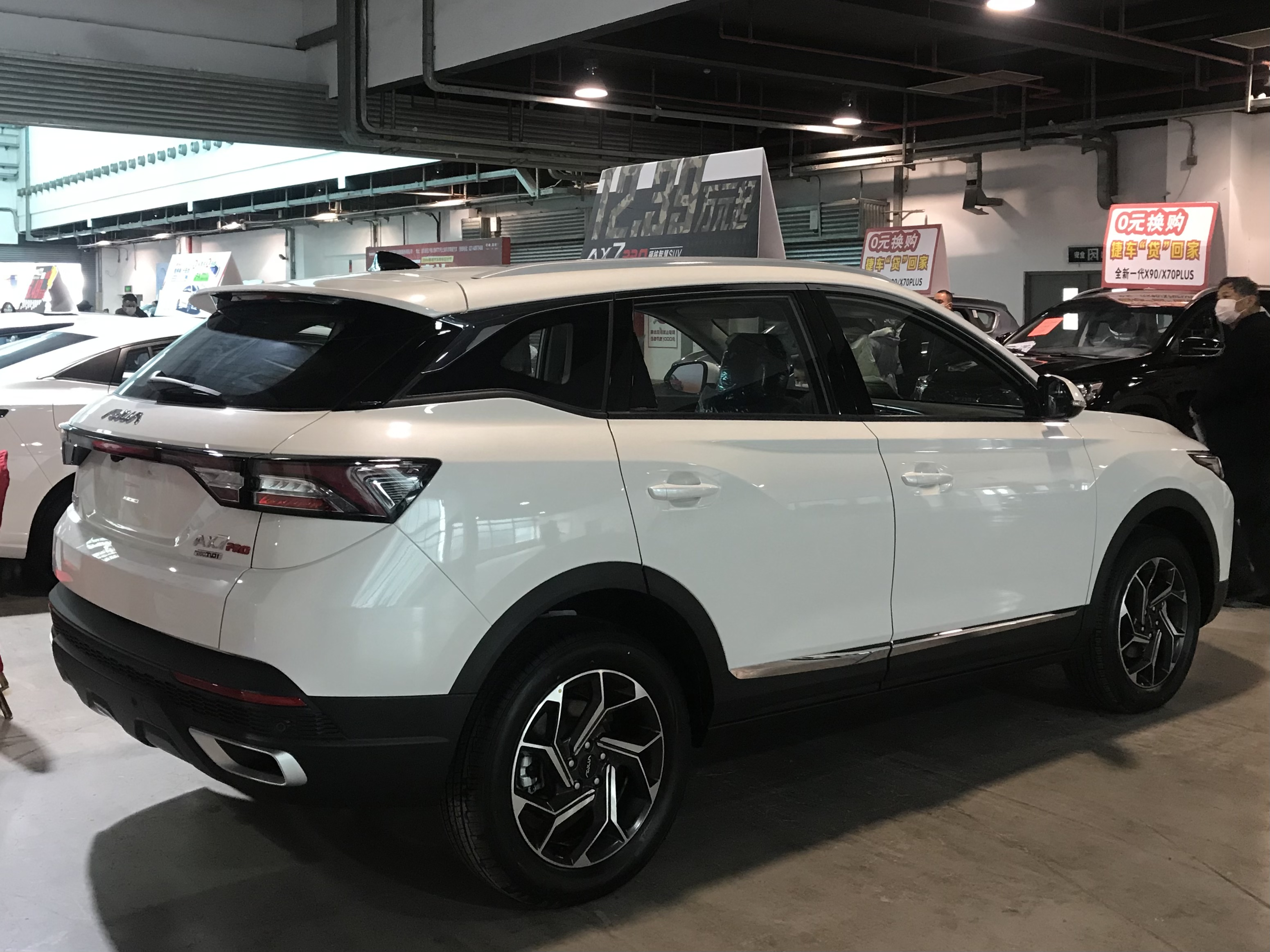
Aeolus AX7 Pro rear

=== Aeolus AX7 Plus/ Mach Edition (2022 facelift) ===
A facelift variant called the Aeolus AX7 Plus was set to launch in 2021 for the 2022 model year. The final vehicle launched in September 2021 was called the AX7 Mach Edition (马赫版) while the actual product still wears the Plus badging teased before the launch. The updated model features a slightly redesigned front end while the powertrain remains unchanged. Due to the redesigned front end, the length of the AX7 Plus model has further extended by 10 mm (0.4 in) (up to 4,660 mm (183.5 in)) compared to the AX7 Pro model, the width, height and wheelbase remains.

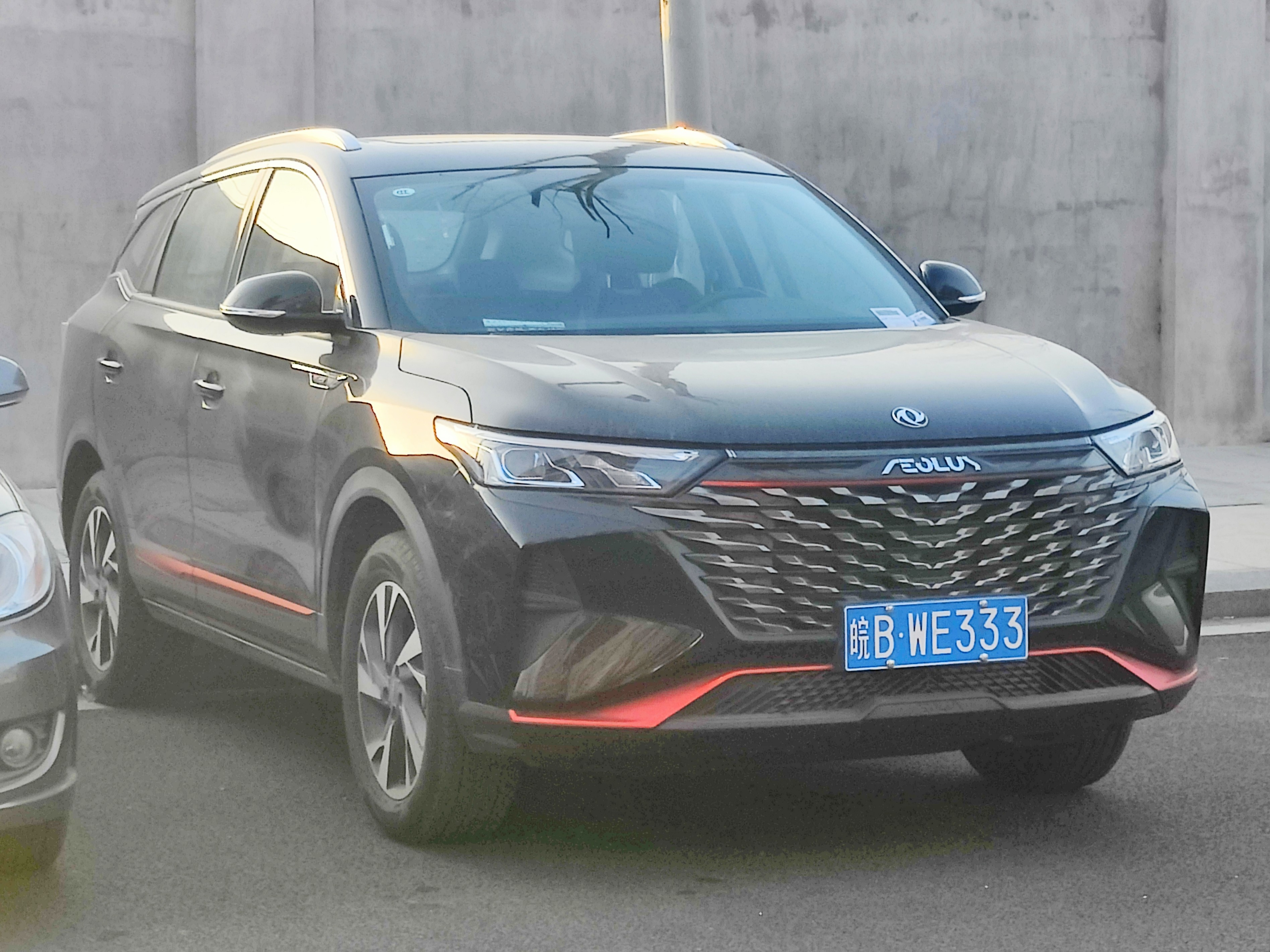
Aeolus AX7 Plus (Mach Edition) front

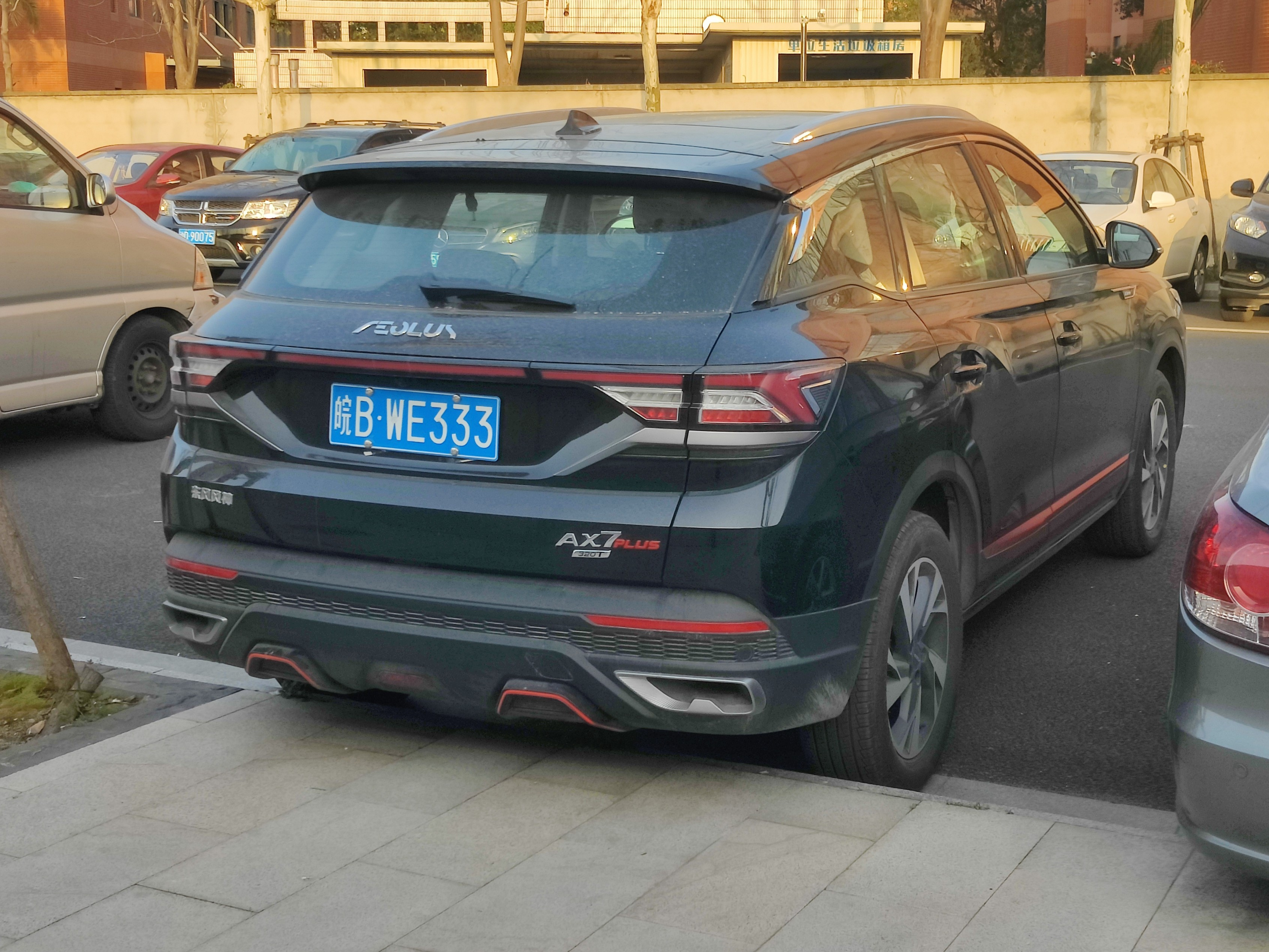
Aeolus AX7 Plus (Mach Edition) rear
