= Aeolus AX5 =

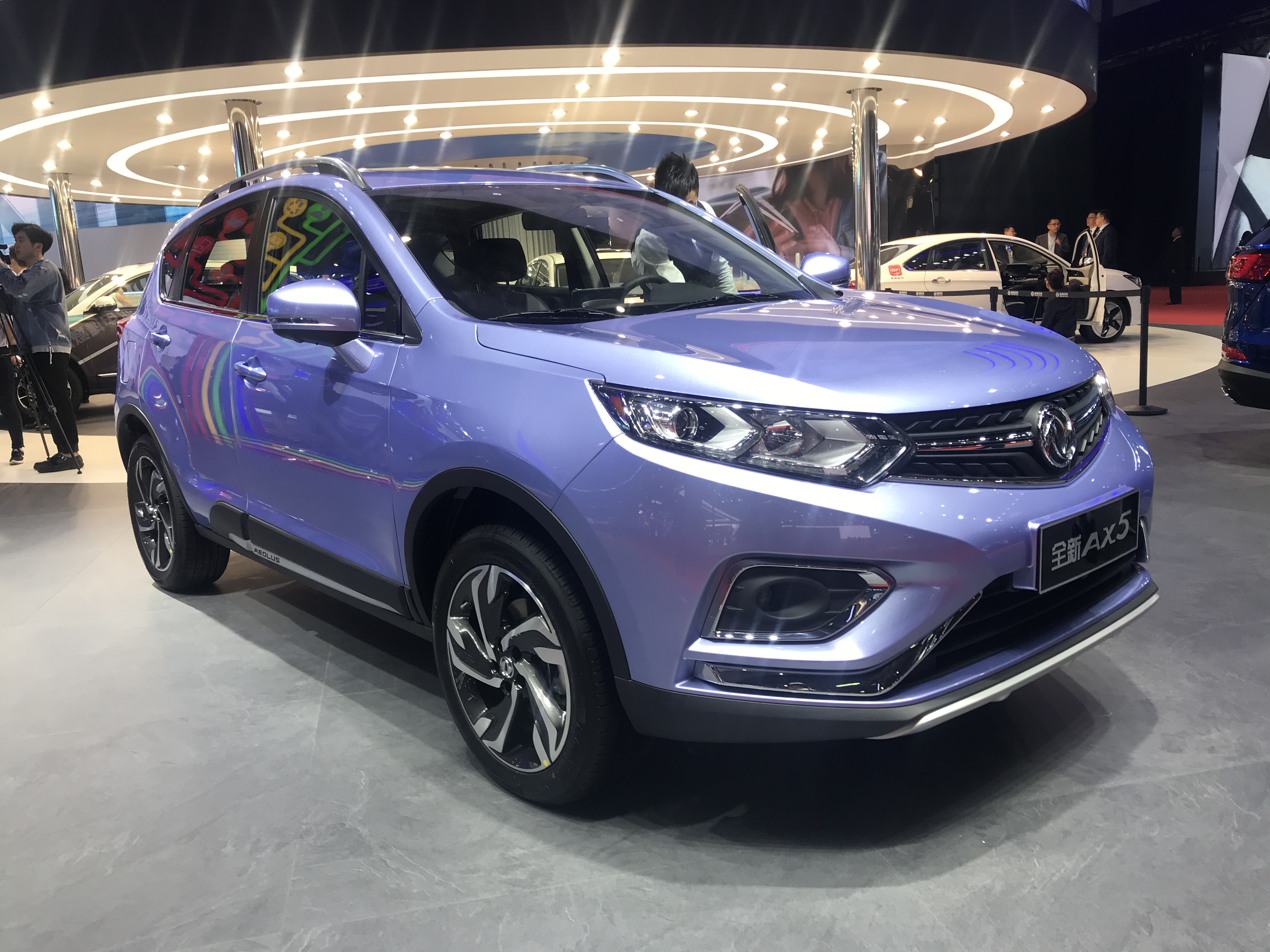

Overview
- Manufacturer: Aeolus
- Production: 2016–2020
- Model years: 2016–2021

Body and chassis
- Layout: Front-engine, front-wheel-drive

Powertrain
- Engine: 1.4 L DFMA14T turbo I4 (petrol)
- Transmission: 6-speed manual 6-speed DCT

Dimensions
- Wheelbase: 2,630 mm (103.5 in)
- Length: 4,501 mm (177.2 in)
- Width: 1,806 mm (71.1 in)
- Height: 1,650 mm (65.0 in)

Chronology
- Successor: Aeolus Haoji

The Aeolus AX5 is a compact crossover SUV produced by Dongfeng Motor Corporation under the Aeolus sub-brand.

== Overview ==
The Aeolus AX5 CUV debuted during the 2016 Beijing Auto Show with the AX5 being available to the market in late 2016 at the Guangzhou Auto Show. The AX5 is powered by a 1.4 liter turbo inline-four engine producing 140 horsepower (103kW) and 196 N-m. Prices range from 89,700 yuan to 128,700 yuan.

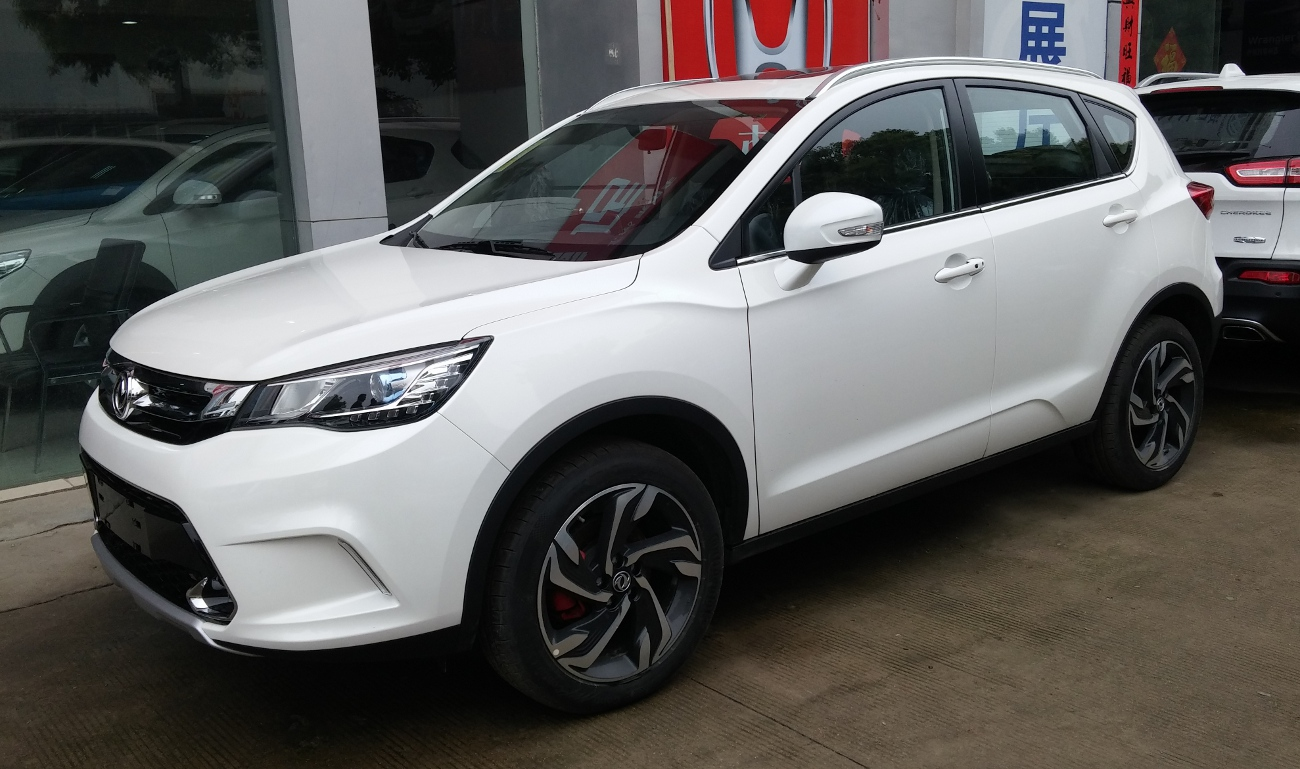
Aeolus AX5

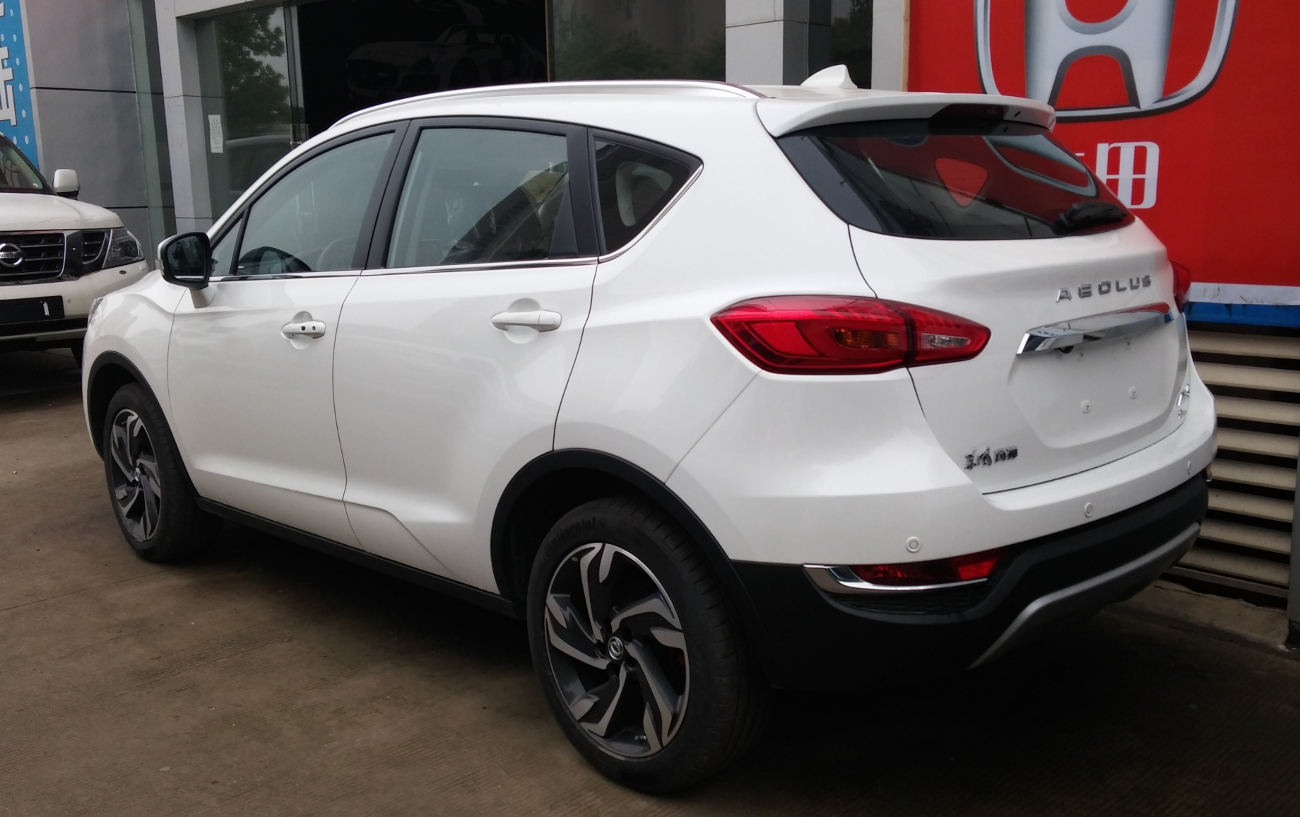
Rear

== 2019 facelift ==
The AX5 received a facelift in 2019 and was revealed during the 2019 Shanghai Auto Show. The facelifted AX5 model features a front fascia similar to the Dongfeng Fengdu MX3 crossover from the same platform that never made it to the market.

The facelifted AX5 is equipped with a DFMA14T 1.4 liter turbo engine producing 133 horsepower which is 7 horsepower less than the pre facelift model. The engine is mated to either a 5-speed manual gearbox or a 6-speed DCT.
