= Fukang (disambiguation) =

Fukang may refer to:

- Fukang, a county-level city in Xinjiang Uygur Autonomous Region of the People's Republic of China
- Fukang Subdistrict, a subdistrict and the seat of Qiaodong District, in the heart of Shijiazhuang, Hebei, People's Republic of China
- Fukang (meteorite), a meteorite that was found in the mountains near Fukang, China in 2000
- Citroën Fukang, the first in a range of cars produced for the Chinese market by the Dongfeng Peugeot-Citroën Automobile
- Fukang (automotive brand), an automotive brand
- Princess Fukang, a princess of the Song dynasty
