= Bogeda Biosphere Reserve =

Protected area in Xinjiang, China

- Location within China
- Location: Xinjiang, PR China
- Coordinates: 43°52′48″N 87°45′0″E
- Area: 128,690 ha (318,000 acres)
- Established: 1990
- Governing body: Xinjiang Tianchi Lake Administration Committee

The Bogeda Biosphere Reserve (Chinese: 博格达世界生物圈保护区; pinyin: Bógédá shìjiè shēngwùquān bǎohù qū, Mongolian: Богд шим мандлын нөөц газар, Bogd shim mandlyn noots gazar), also known in English as Bogda Biosphere Reserve, is located in the eastern region of the Tianshan Mountains in China's Xinjiang Province. Local residents named the area the Sangong River Valley after one of the largest rivers in this region, which originates from Bogda Peak. Altogether, five major landscapes are distributed throughout the northern and southern areas of the biosphere reserve: ice-snow belts (5,445–3,100 meters above sea level), alpine and sub-alpine meadow belts (3,100–2,500 meters asl), forest belts (2,500–1,600 meters asl), steppe belts (1,700–900 meters asl) and sand desert dunes (460–3,300 meters asl). The topography consists of a middle mountain belt, low mountain erosion hills and alluvial areas. Tianchi Lake is the only natural lake in the region and lies adjacent to the Sangong River.

== Ecology ==
The Bogeda Biosphere Reserve is situated within the temperate continental arid climate zone. Different habitat types range from snowy landscapes to meadows, steppe and sand dunes, offering ideal circumstances for the development of a rich biodiversity. Alpine and sub-alpine landscapes with Koresia capilliformis and perennial herbaceous cover approximately 80% of the area. The low plain lingo halophyte vegetation desert zone contains flora species such as Suaeda physophora and Halostachys caspica.

Characteristic fauna species include Ciconia nigra (Black stork), Buteo rufinus (Long-legged buzzard) and Felis lynx (Eurasian lynx). However, numerous endangered or threatened animal species within the biosphere reserve struggle for survival, including Falco subbuteo (Eurasian hobby) and Gazella subgutturosa (Black-tailed gazelle) among others. The region is also home to species of commercial or traditional importance, such as Cistanche salsa, which grows in desert habitats and is used for traditional Chinese medicine.

== Socio-economic characteristics ==
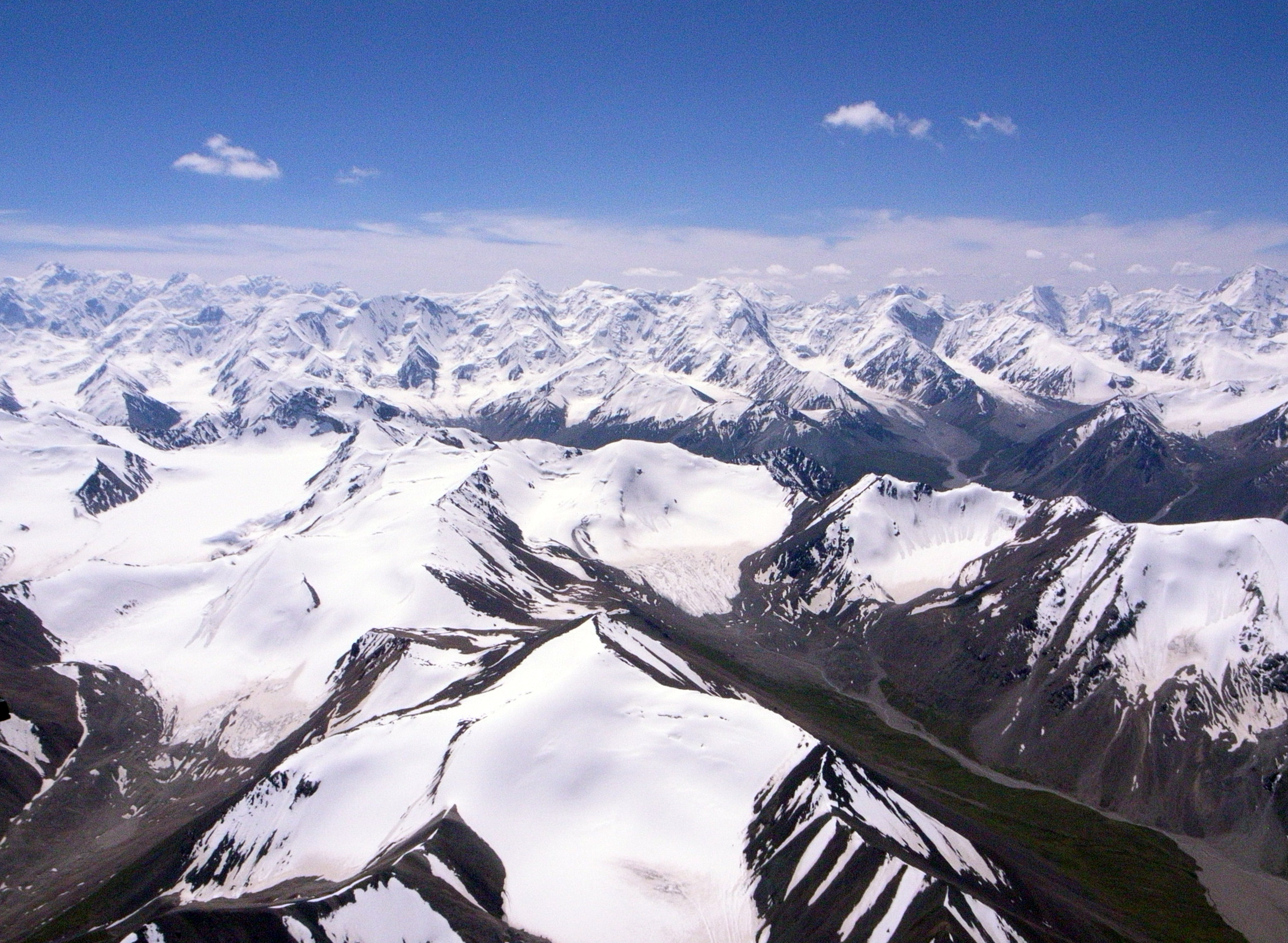
Tian Shan mountains, Bogeda Biosphere Reserve

About 134,000 people inhabit the Bogeda biosphere reserve permanently, while over 410,000 people visit on a seasonal basis. The main economic activities are livestock, agriculture and tourism. The majority of inhabitants are Han Chinese (80%) with Hui (5%), Kazakh (4%) and Uygur (4%) populations also living in the reserve. The nearest major town is Fukang City, located in the transition zone.

Since the 1960s, the underground freshwater table has deepened, while the underground salt water table has risen. The result has been serious soil salinization and erosion, which hinders the cultivation of agricultural products. The Tianchi Lake, located in the core area on the mountains, is a Taoist shrine and constitutes the main cultural and traditional site of the Bogeda Biosphere Reserve.
