= Chichia =

Chichia Temporal range: Guadalupian

Scientific classification
- Kingdom: Animalia
- Phylum: Chordata
- Class: Actinopterygii
- Family: †Chichiidae; Liu & Wang, 1978
- Genus: †Chichia; Liu & Wang, 1978
- Species: †C. gracilis

Binomial name
- †Chichia gracilis Liu & Wang, 1978

Extinct genus of fishes

Chichia is an extinct genus of freshwater ray-finned fish that lived during the Guadalupian (middle Permian) epoch. It contains a single species, C. gracilis, known from the Bogda Shan of Xinjiang, China.

== See also ==
- Prehistoric fish
- List of prehistoric bony fish
