= Bogd Uul =

The name Bogd Uul (Mongolian: Богд уул) can refer to a number of different mountains and mountain ranges, including:

== In Mongolia ==
- Bogd Khan Uul near Ulaanbaatar

== In China ==
- Bogda Shan in Xinjiang
