= Fukang (automotive brand) =

Chinese automobile manufacturer

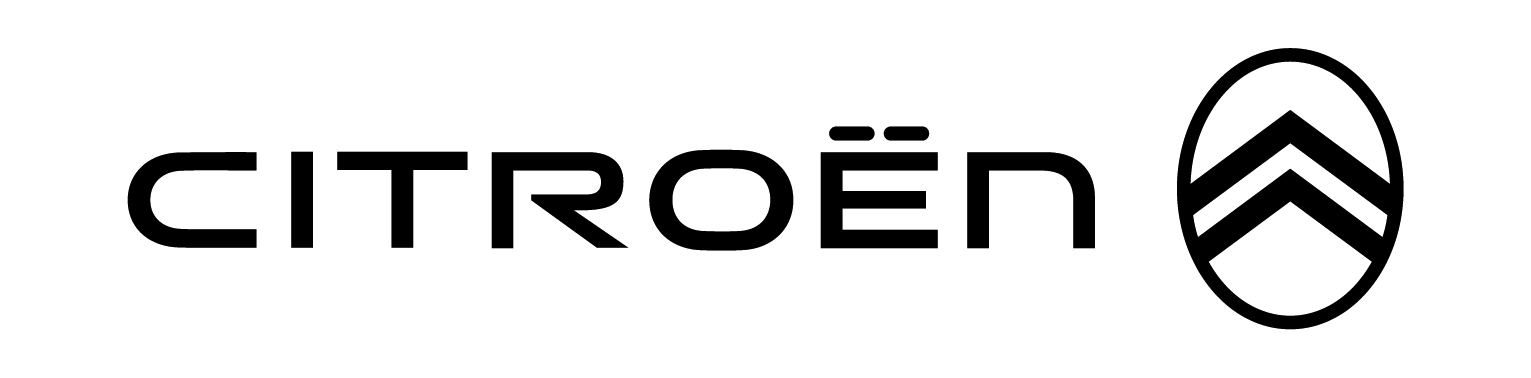
- Type: Private
- Industry: Automotive
- Founded: 1994; 32 years ago
- Founder: Dongfeng Peugeot-Citroën Automobile

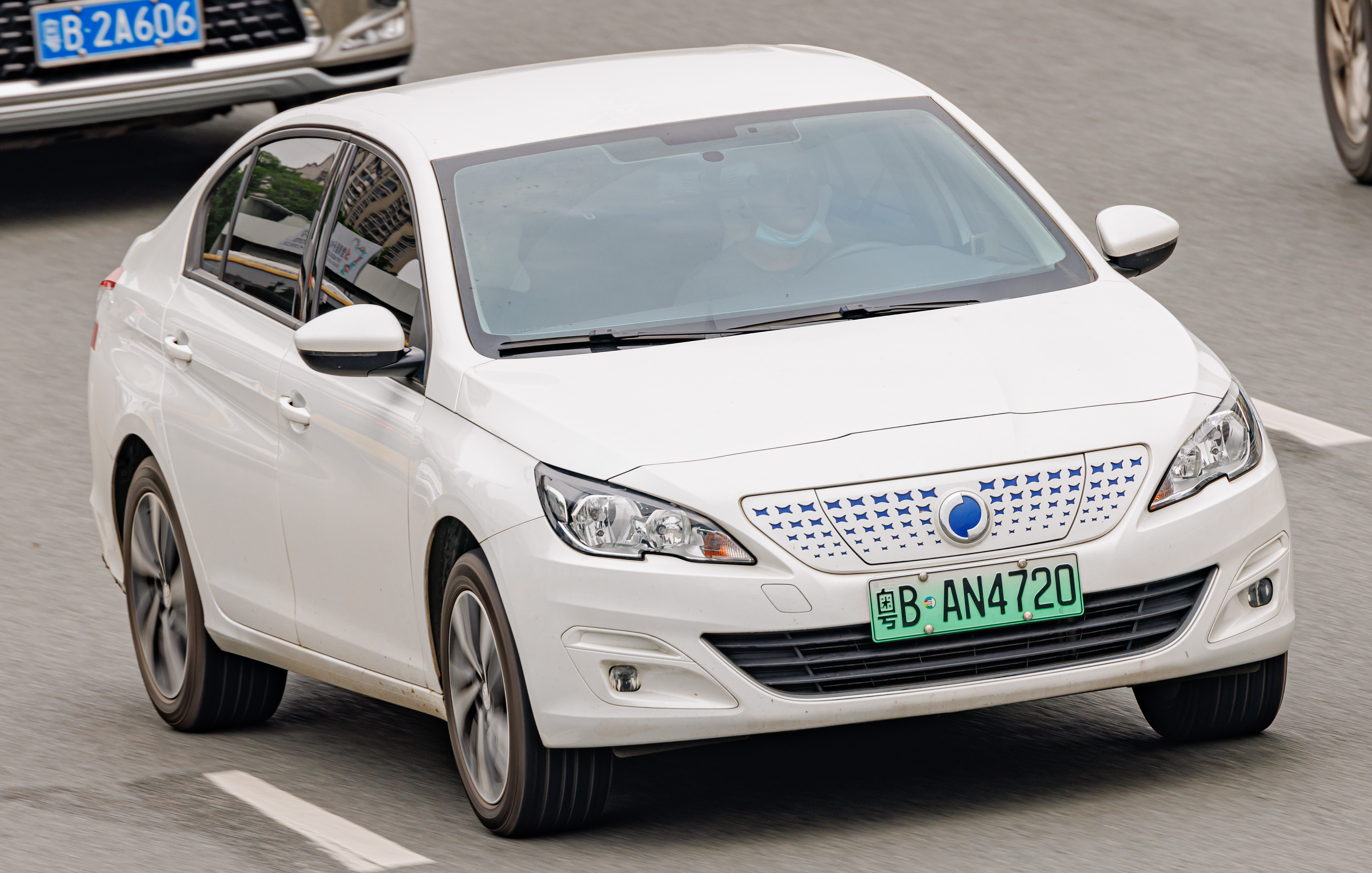
Fukang ES600

Fukang (Chinese: 富康) is a Chinese automobile manufacturer that specializes in developing electric vehicles.

== History ==
Fukang was founded in 1994. Originally being the name of a compact car of Dongfeng-Citroën, and later, Dongfeng Fukang. The model name is well known for being an affordable compact vehicle in China, so later Dongfeng started using the name for cheap and durable rebadged versions of their compact products, and even later, a brand focusing on affordable entry-level ride-hailing and taxi industry vehicles. Most of their vehicles are rebadged electric versions of Dongfeng Peugeot-Citroën and Dongfeng-Nissan.

== Vehicles ==
=== Current Models ===
Apart from completely rebadged Fukang products, Fukang is also responsible for the production and sales of several electric variants of Dongfeng Peugeot-Citroën vehicles. Fukang has 5 production vehicles.

Model	Photo	Rebadged model
Fukang e-2008		Peugeot 2008
Fukang e-Elysee		Citroën C-Elysée
Fukang ES500		Dongfeng Fengshen A60
Fukang ES600		Peugeot 408
Fukang 4008		Peugeot 4008
Fukang C5 Aircross		Citroën C5 Aircross

== See also ==
- Ciwei
