= Forthing Jingyi S50 =

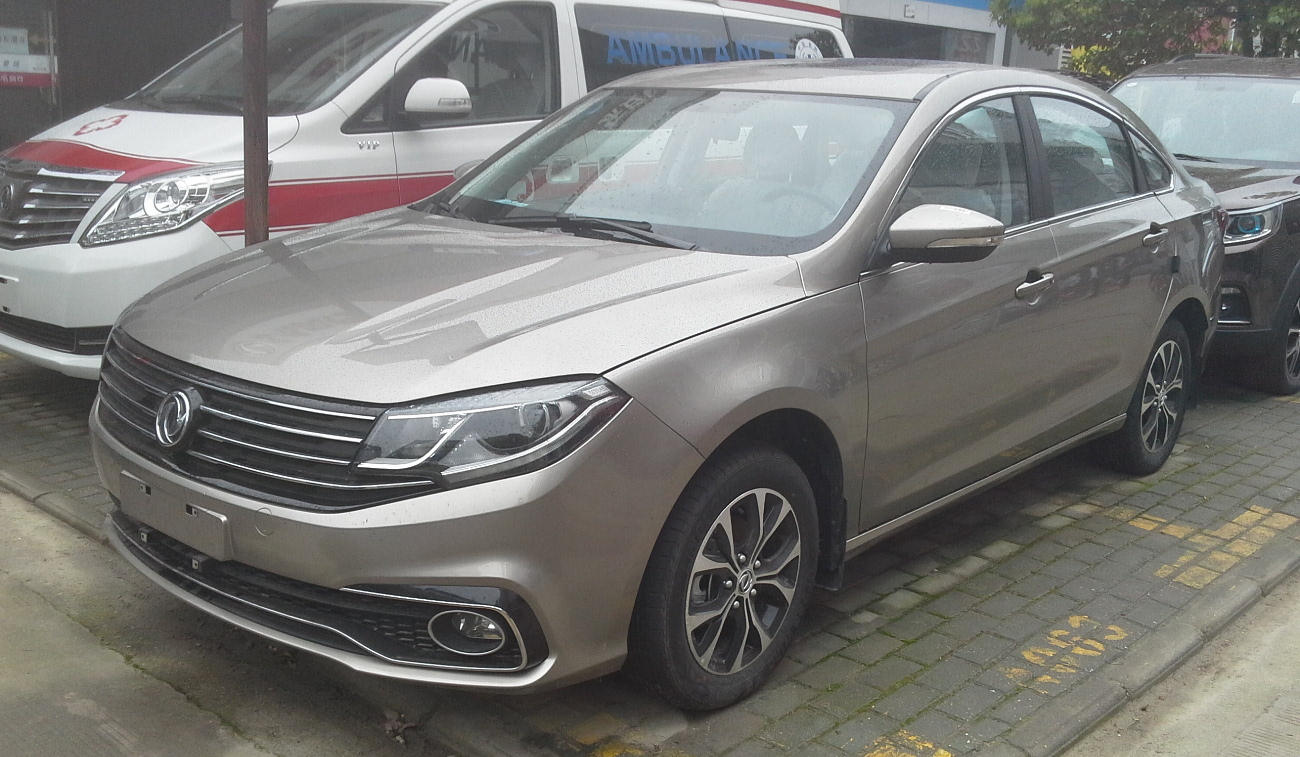

Overview
- Manufacturer: Forthing
- Also called: Forthing (Dongfeng Fengxing) Jingyi S50 ev (electric version); IVM Caris/ Innoson Caris (Nigeria); SEV E-TUS (Mexico)
- Production: 2014–present
- Assembly: Liuzhou, China; El Mghira, Ben Arous, Tunisia

Body and chassis
- Layout: Front-engine, front-wheel-drive
- Platform: Nissan B platform
- Related: Nissan Sentra B16; Nissan Sylphy; Dongfeng Fengshen A60

Powertrain
- Engine: 1.5 L HR15DE I4 (petrol); 1.6 L HR16DE I4
- Transmission: 5-speed manual CVT automatic

Dimensions
- Wheelbase: 2,700 mm (106.3 in)
- Length: 4,630 mm (182.3 in)
- Width: 1,790 mm (70.5 in)
- Height: 1,526 mm (60.1 in)

The Forthing Jingyi S50 is a compact sedan produced by Dongfeng Liuzhou Motor under the Jingyi product series of the Forthing or Dongfeng Fengxing sub-brand.

== Overview ==
The Forthing Jingyi S50 sedan debuted during the 2014 Beijing Auto Show as the Dongfeng Fengxing Jingyi S50 and was launched on the China car market in later 2014. The Jingyi S50 compact sedan shares the same platform as the Dongfeng Fengshen A60 compact sedan with both cars based on the Nissan Sylphy produced by the Dongfeng Nissan joint venture in China.

The styling of the Jingyi S50 at launch was heavily inspired by the Hyundai Sonata with similar front DRG designs despite being in a smaller segment. The final production Jingyi S50 was launched in September 2014 with prices starting from 69,900 yuan to 102,900 yuan. Engines includes a 118hp 1.5 liter engine mated to a 5-speed manual transmission and a 120hp 1.6 liter engine mated to a CVT. The 1.5 liter engine is a Mivec sourced from Mitsubishi, and the 1.6 liter engine is carried over from Nissan.

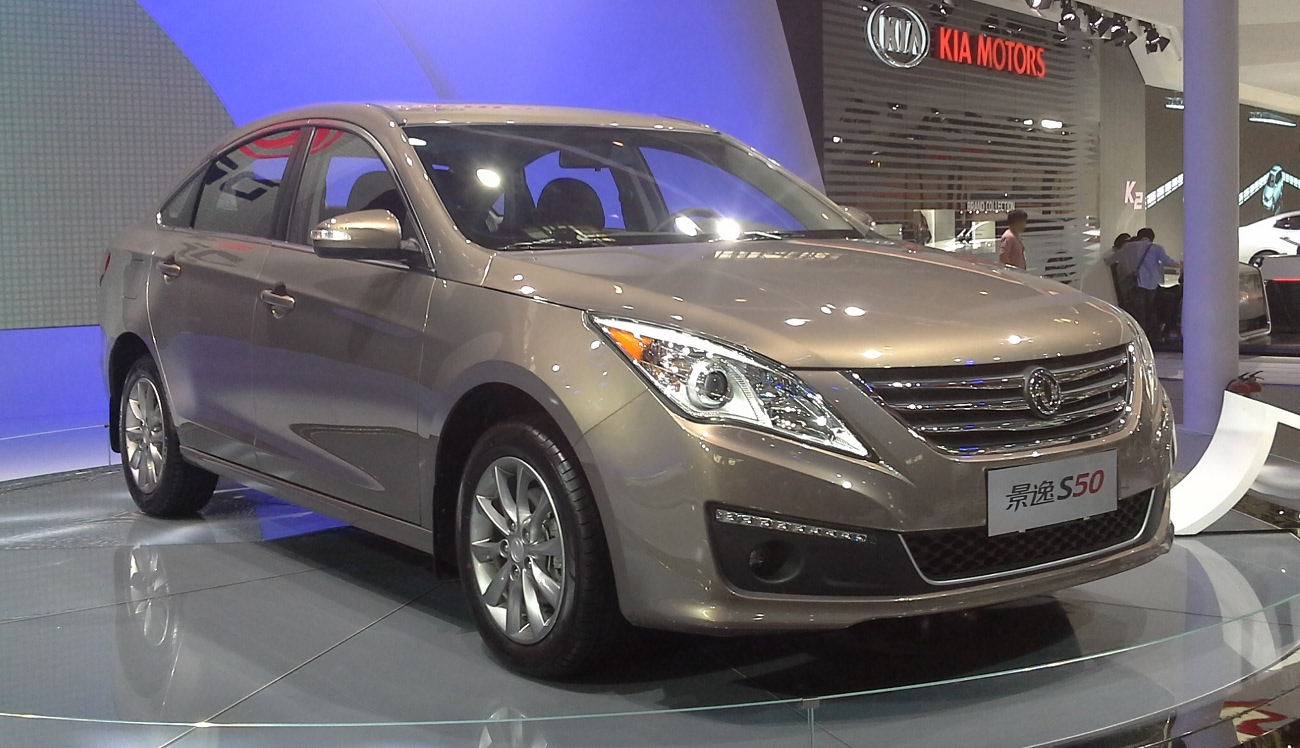
Dongfeng Fengxing Jingyi S50

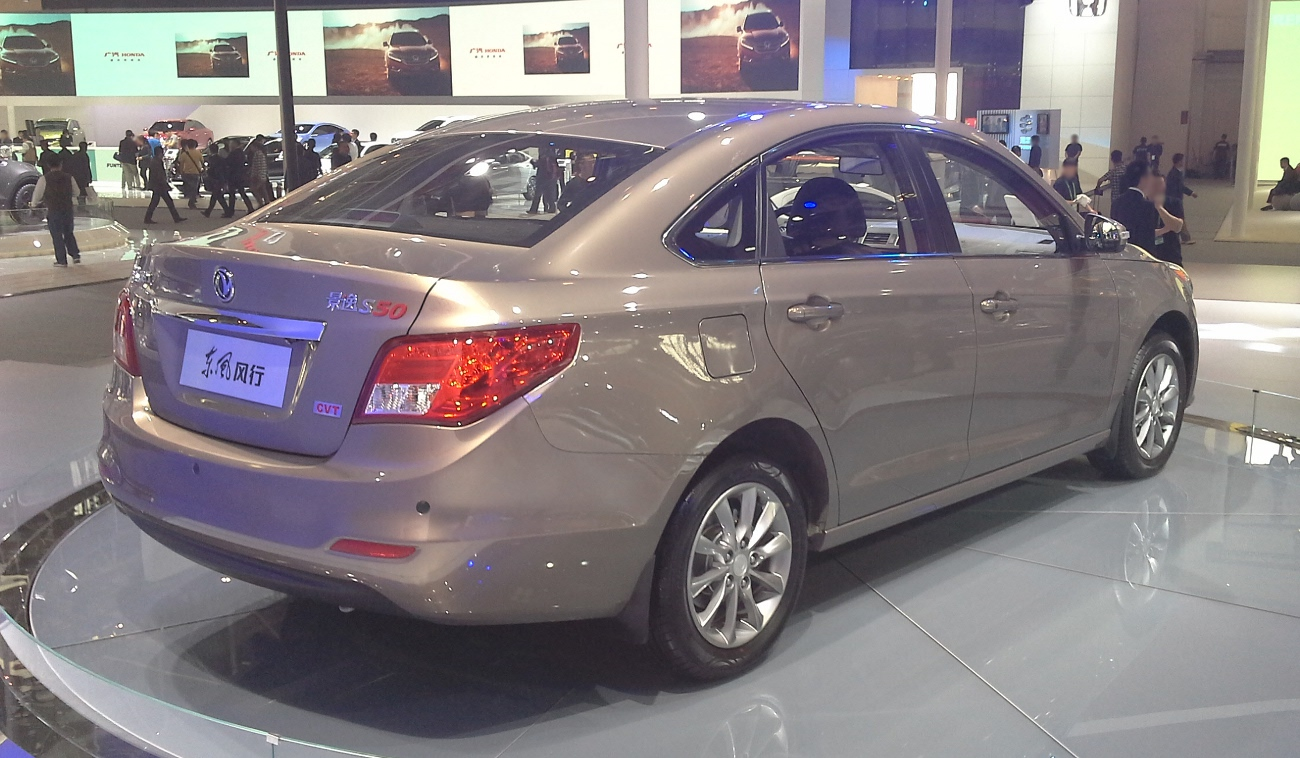
Dongfeng Fengxing Jingyi S50

=== Facelifts ===
As of 2015, news of an upcoming facelift with new engines was released, with the facelifted design placing the Forthing Jingyi S50 sedan more inline with other Forthing or Dongfeng Fengxing products. The additional engine is a 147hp 2.0 liter petrol engine sourced from PSA.

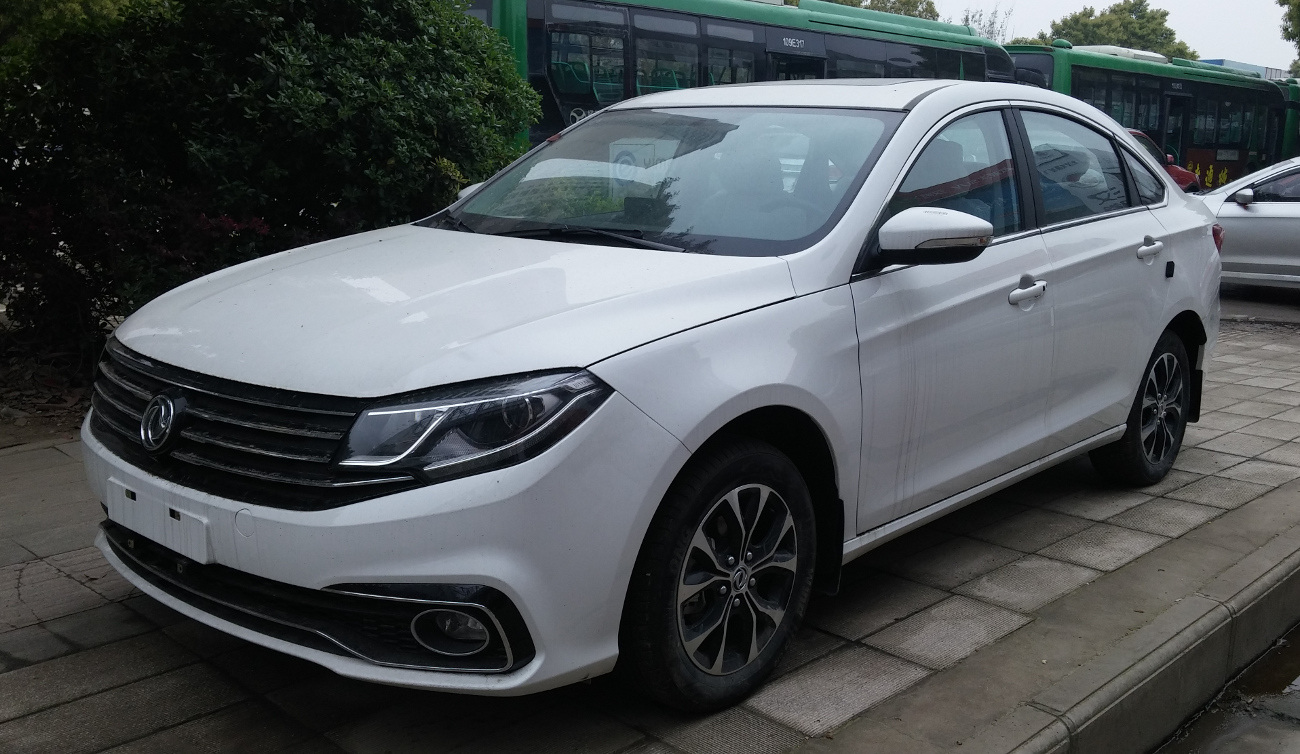
Forthing Jingyi S50 facelift

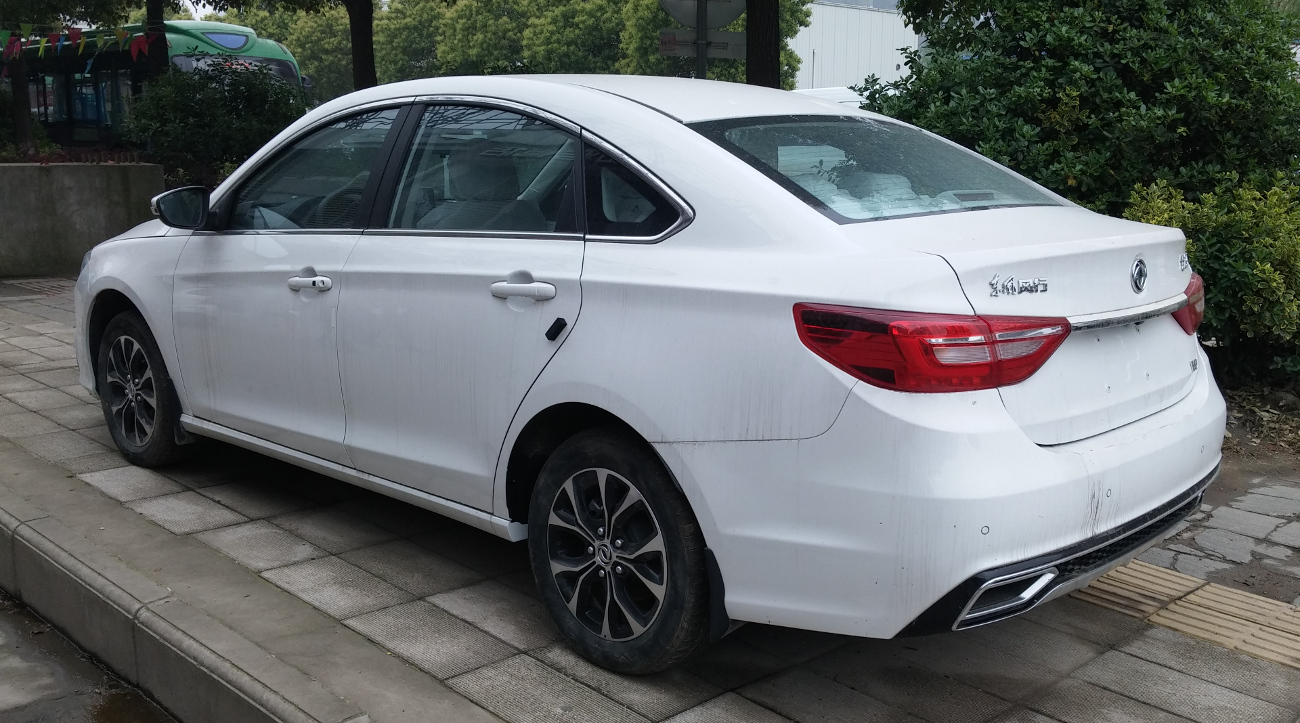
Forthing Jingyi S50 facelift

For oversea markets, Dongfeng Motor upgrade (facelift) the Jingyi S50 to become the Joyear S50 in 2018, the restyle is identical to the 2015 Chinese domestic market facelift with redesigned front and rear elements, integrating mixed LED halogen lamps and updated interior with different materials and infotainment system. The post-facelift version of the Jingyi S50 is rebadged as the IVM Caris or Innoson Caris by Innoson Vehicle Manufacturing in Nigeria and sold locally.

== Forthing (Fengxing Jingyi) S50 EV ==
During the 2016 Beijing Auto Show in China, Dongfeng revealed the Forthing S50-EV, based on the pre-facelift Fengxing Jingyi S50 sedan. The Forthing S50-EV has a range of 250 kilometers and a 150 km/h top speed with electric motor producing 120hp and 280nm of torque.

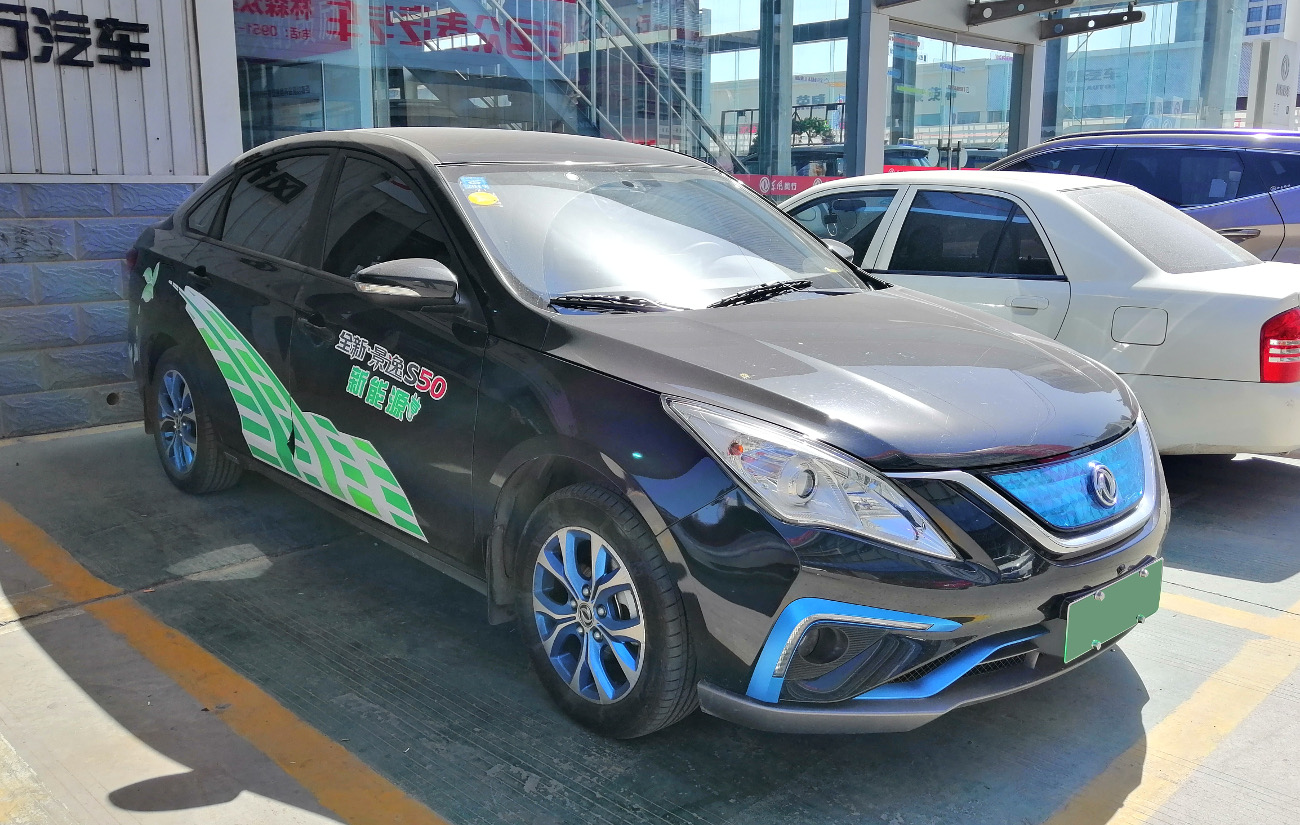
2019 Forthing Jingyi S50 EV

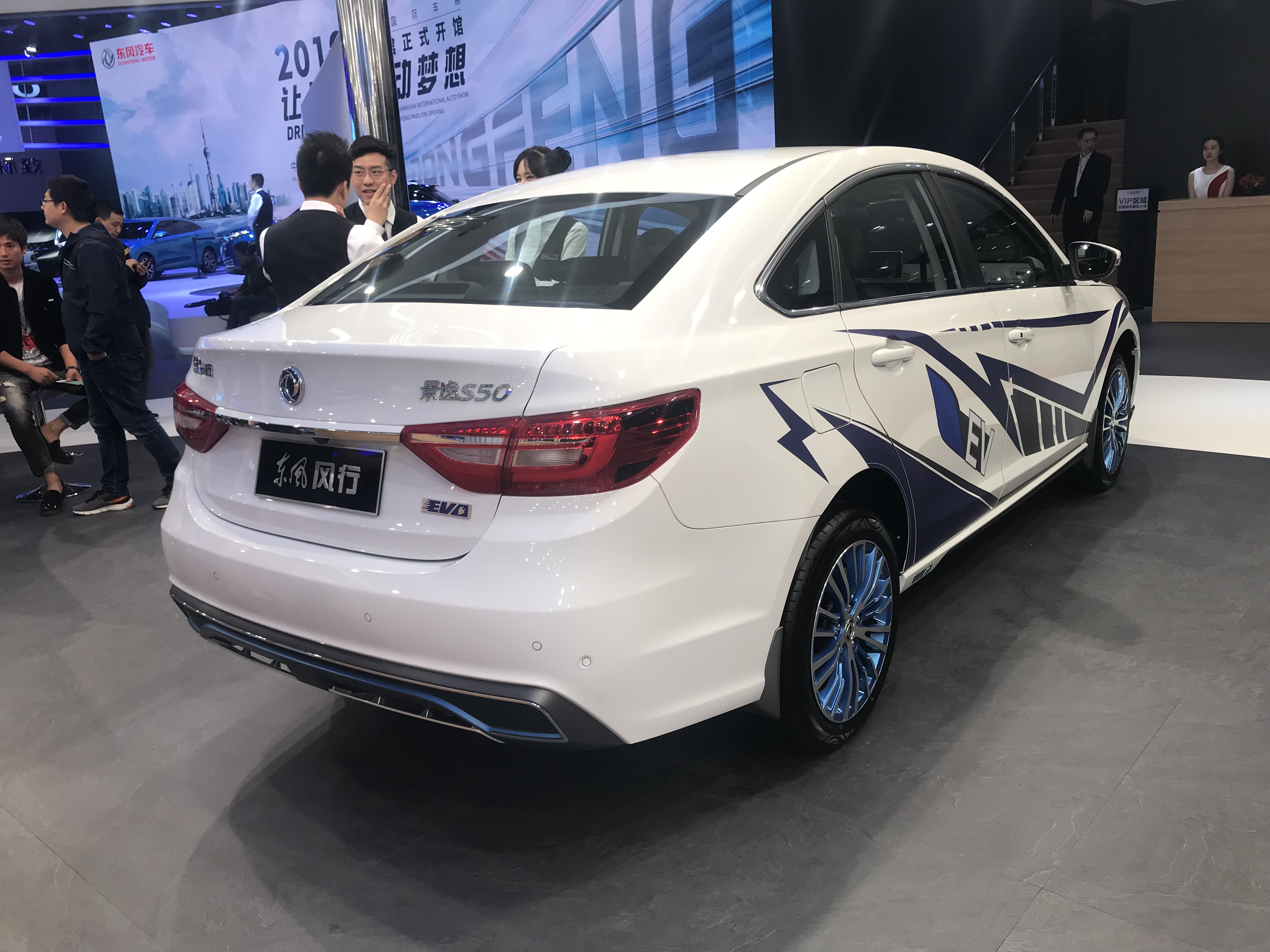
2019 Forthing Jingyi S50 EV (rear)

== Forthing S60 EV ==
The Forthing S60 EV is another electric variant of the Forthing Jingyi S50 sedan and was launched in November 2021. The dimensions of the S60 EV is 4745mm in length, 1790mm in width, 1550mm in height, and a 2700mm long wheelbase. The powertrain is a front positioned 163hp electric motor powering the front axle with 280N·m of torque. The battery is a 57.2kWh Ternary lithium battery set with a NEDC range of 415km.

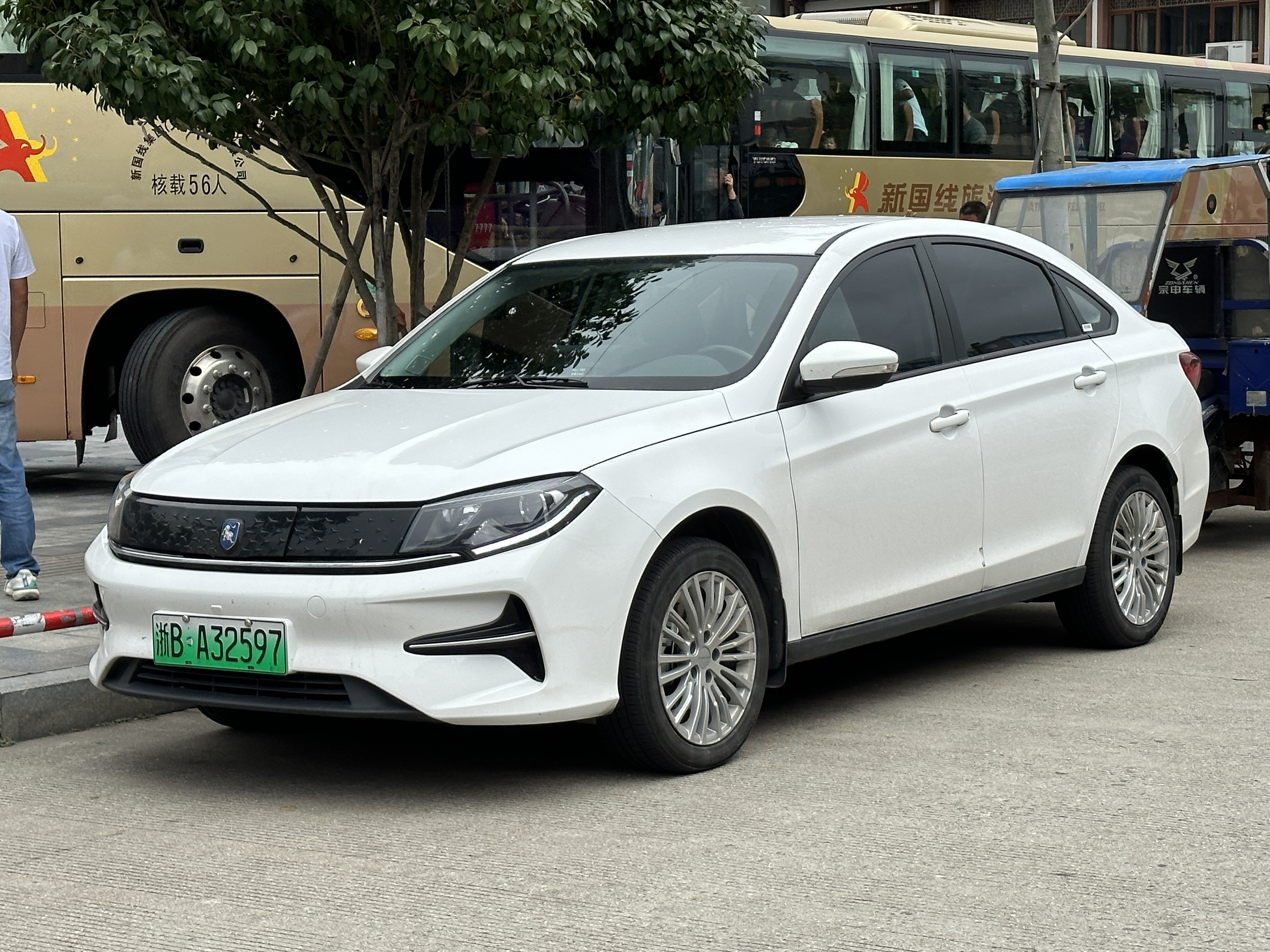
Forthing S60 EV

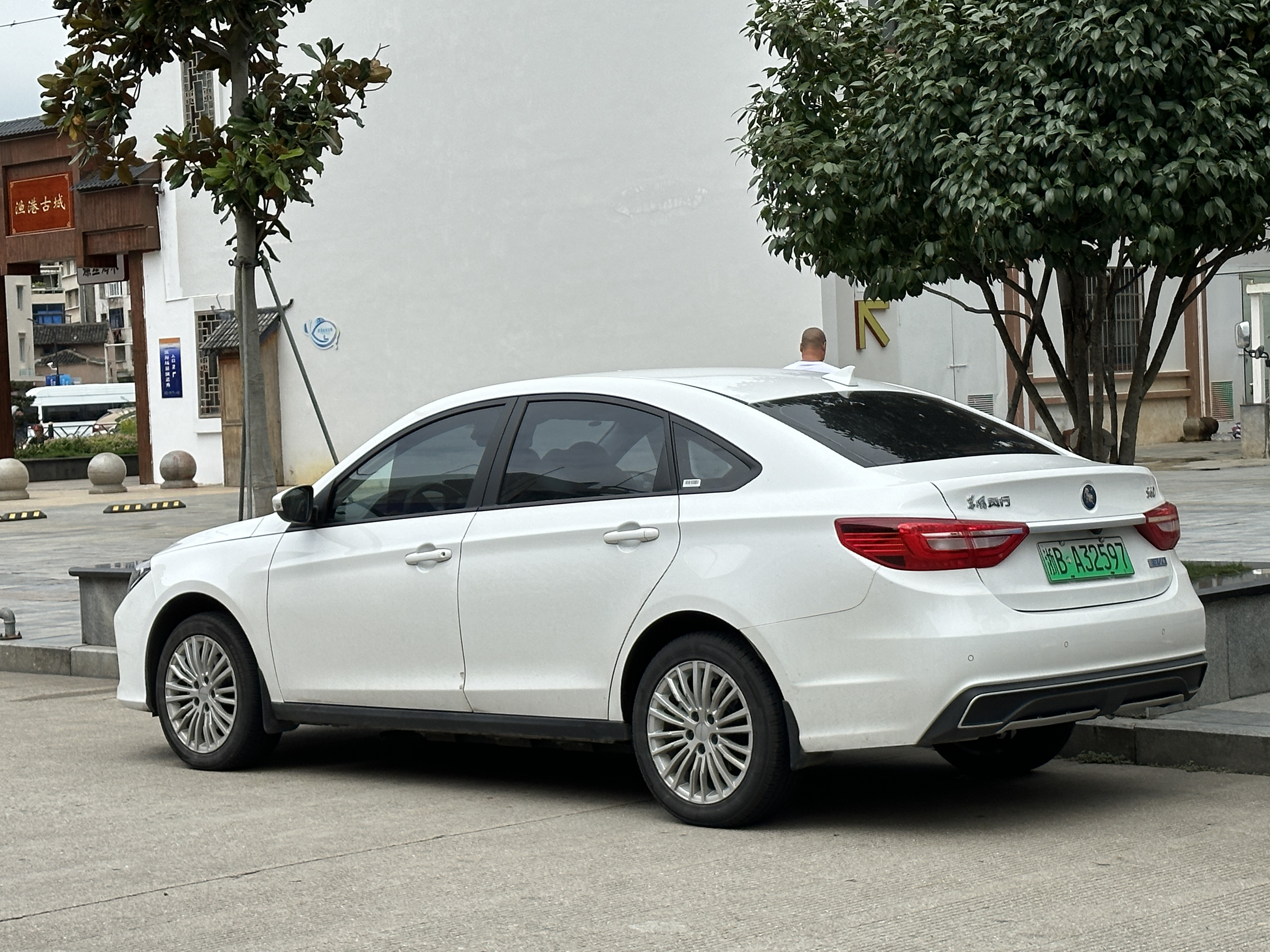
Forthing S60 EV (rear)
