= Heavenly Lake of Tian Shan =

Lake in Xinjiang, China

Tianchi
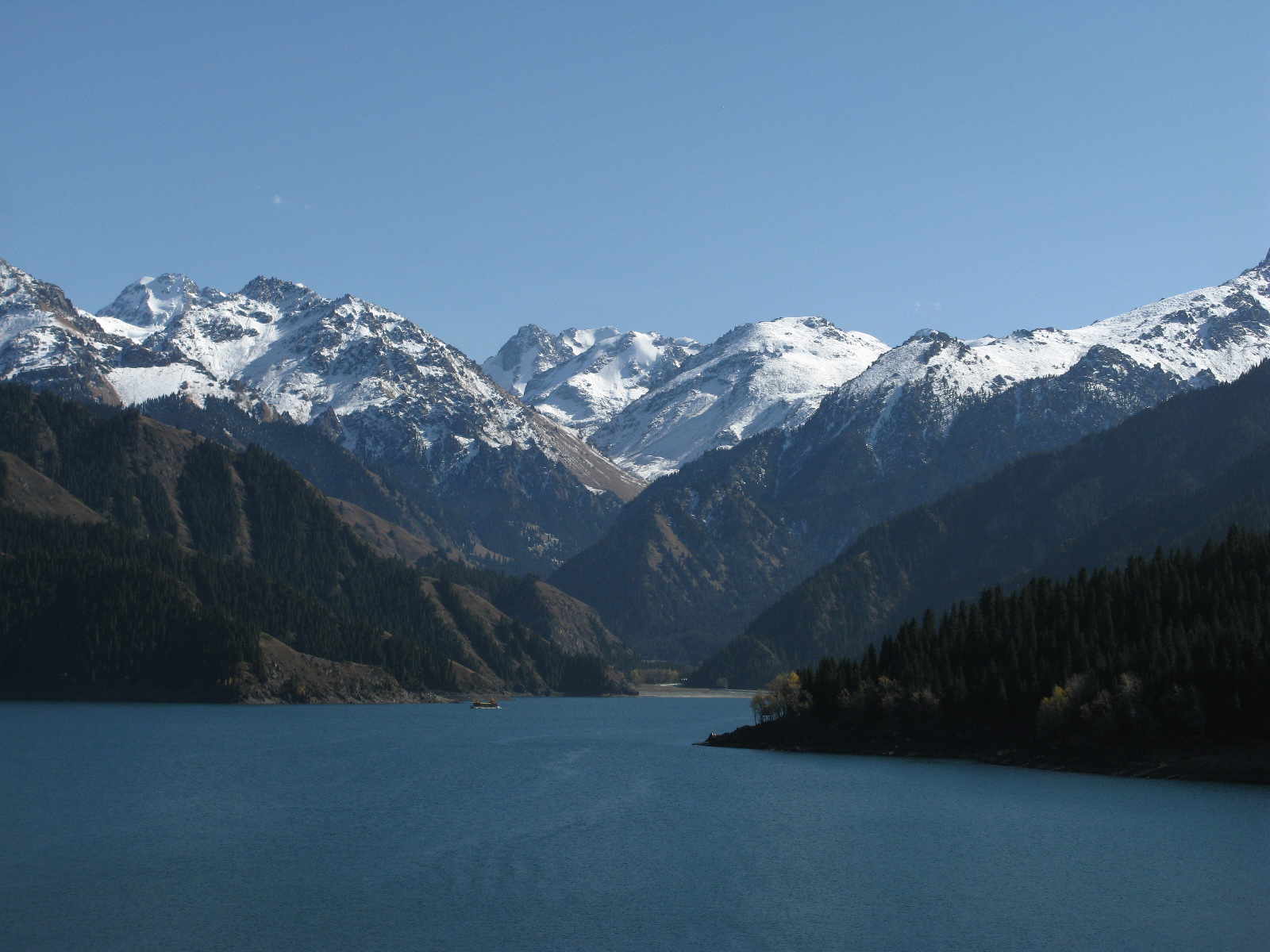
- Tianchi in the winter

- Location within Dzungaria
- Location: Bogda Shan (Tian Shan), in Fukang City, Xinjiang
- Coordinates: 43°53′9.7″N 88°7′56.6″E
- Basin countries: China
- Surface area: 4.9 km^{2} (1.9 sq mi)
- Max. depth: 105 m (344 ft)
- Surface elevation: 1,907 m (6,257 ft)

Tianchi (Chinese: 天池; pinyin: Tiānchí, Uyghur: بوغدا كۆلى) is an alpine lake in Xinjiang, Northwest China. The name (天池) literally means Heavenly Lake and can refer to several lakes in mainland China and Taiwan. This Tianchi lies on the north side of the Bogda Shan ("Mountain of God", Bogda is a Mongolian word meaning "God") range of the Tian Shan ("Mountain of Heaven"), about 30 kilometres (19 mi) south of Fukang and 45 kilometres (28 mi) east (straight-line distance) of Ürümqi. It is an alpine drift lake shaped in the Quaternary Glacier period.

Formerly known as Yaochi ("Jade Lake"), it was named Tianchi in 1783 by Mingliang, the Qing Commander of Urumqi Command.

The lake is 1,907 metres (6,257 ft) above sea level, covering 4.9 square kilometres (1.9 sq mi), 105 metres (344 ft) deep at the deepest point.

In 2006, it was designated for four years of restoration work at a cost of 800 million yuan (US$100 million). The plan calls for the tourism area around the lake to be increased from the present 158 km^{2} to 548 km^{2}. The lake is classified as a highest level scenic area by the China National Tourism Administration.

The lake is accessible by Provincial Highway 111 from Fukang.

The lake is the titular starting point of Vikram Seth's first book, From Heaven Lake: Travels Through Sinkiang and Tibet (1983), which describes his hitchhiking journey through Xinjiang, Qinghai, Tibet and Nepal to return home to India, during a break in his studies at Nanjing University in 1981.

== Climate ==
Climate data for Heavenly Lake of Tianshan (Tianchi), elevation 1,943 m (6,375 ft), (1991–2020 normals, extremes 1981–present)
| Month | Jan | Feb | Mar | Apr | May | Jun | Jul | Aug | Sep | Oct | Nov | Dec | Year |
|---|---|---|---|---|---|---|---|---|---|---|---|---|---|
| Record high °C (°F) | 12.9 (55.2) | 14.4 (57.9) | 16.6 (61.9) | 22.9 (73.2) | 25.3 (77.5) | 28.4 (83.1) | 32.7 (90.9) | 31.2 (88.2) | 27.3 (81.1) | 22.1 (71.8) | 16.3 (61.3) | 12.2 (54.0) | 32.7 (90.9) |
| Mean daily maximum °C (°F) | −5.1 (22.8) | −3.5 (25.7) | 1.3 (34.3) | 9.3 (48.7) | 14.7 (58.5) | 19.1 (66.4) | 21.2 (70.2) | 20.4 (68.7) | 15.2 (59.4) | 8.1 (46.6) | 2.0 (35.6) | −2.9 (26.8) | 8.3 (47.0) |
| Daily mean °C (°F) | −11.6 (11.1) | −9.8 (14.4) | −4.7 (23.5) | 3.0 (37.4) | 8.6 (47.5) | 13.4 (56.1) | 15.5 (59.9) | 14.5 (58.1) | 9.5 (49.1) | 2.9 (37.2) | −3.0 (26.6) | −8.6 (16.5) | 2.5 (36.5) |
| Mean daily minimum °C (°F) | −16.8 (1.8) | −15.3 (4.5) | −9.9 (14.2) | −2.0 (28.4) | 4.0 (39.2) | 9.1 (48.4) | 11.2 (52.2) | 10.3 (50.5) | 5.7 (42.3) | −0.3 (31.5) | −6.3 (20.7) | −12.7 (9.1) | −1.9 (28.6) |
| Record low °C (°F) | −33.2 (−27.8) | −32.6 (−26.7) | −26.5 (−15.7) | −20.2 (−4.4) | −8.6 (16.5) | −1.8 (28.8) | 1.7 (35.1) | −2.8 (27.0) | −7.2 (19.0) | −15.2 (4.6) | −31.2 (−24.2) | −28.2 (−18.8) | −33.2 (−27.8) |
| Average precipitation mm (inches) | 7.7 (0.30) | 9.9 (0.39) | 19.4 (0.76) | 57.9 (2.28) | 89.9 (3.54) | 101.4 (3.99) | 102.5 (4.04) | 86.4 (3.40) | 35.8 (1.41) | 27.5 (1.08) | 19.8 (0.78) | 13.5 (0.53) | 571.7 (22.5) |
| Average precipitation days (≥ 0.1 mm) | 5.5 | 5.7 | 7.0 | 9.3 | 10.2 | 11.8 | 12.6 | 9.8 | 6.4 | 6.1 | 6.5 | 6.6 | 97.5 |
| Average snowy days | 6.9 | 6.8 | 8.5 | 7.5 | 3.5 | 0.3 | 0.1 | 0.1 | 1.5 | 5.5 | 8.2 | 7.9 | 56.8 |
| Average relative humidity (%) | 63 | 63 | 65 | 61 | 59 | 60 | 61 | 59 | 58 | 61 | 62 | 64 | 61 |
| Mean monthly sunshine hours | 163.0 | 181.8 | 220.1 | 230.9 | 260.4 | 249.5 | 256.5 | 262.2 | 239.4 | 208.4 | 158.3 | 141.9 | 2,572.4 |
| Percentage possible sunshine | 56 | 60 | 59 | 57 | 57 | 54 | 56 | 62 | 65 | 63 | 56 | 51 | 58 |
Source: China Meteorological Administrationall-time extreme temperatureall-time August high
