= Fukang meteorite =

Pallasite meteorite found near Fukang, China

Fukang
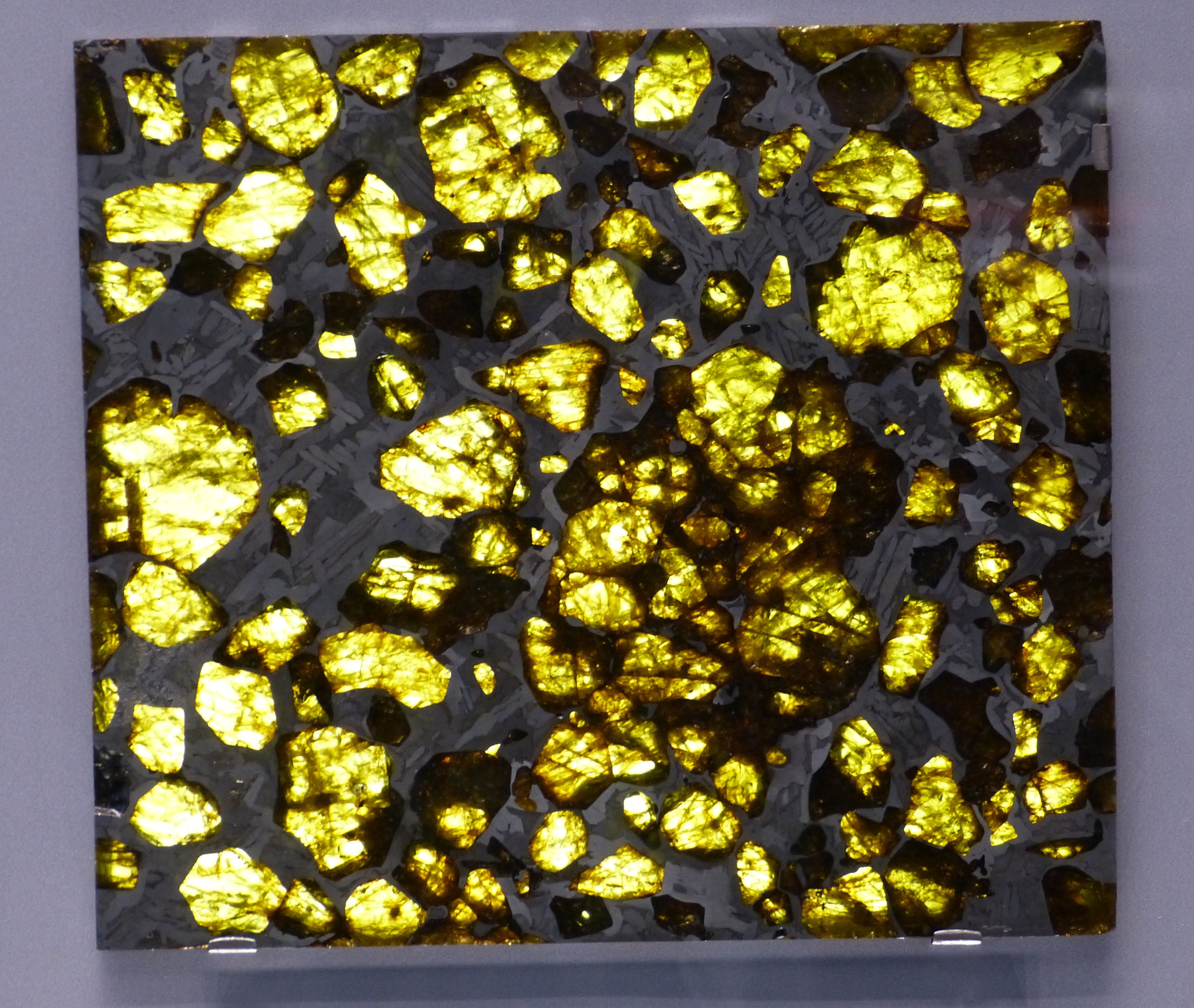
- Part of Fukang meteorite, Natural History Museum, Vienna.
- Type: Stony–iron
- Class: Pallasite
- Group: Main Group Pallasite (MGP)
- Composition: Fe 89.9 wt%, Ni 9.0 wt%, P 0.62 wt%, Co 0.51 wt%; Ge 41 µg/g, As 26 µg/g, Ga 19.1 µg/g, Pd 5.1 µg/g, Au 2.6 µg/g; Ir 43 ng/g.
- Country: China
- Region: Fukang, Xinjiang Province
- Coordinates: 44°26′N 87°38′E
- Observed fall: No
- Found date: 2000
- TKW: 1003 kg
- Related media on Wikimedia Commons

The Fukang meteorite is a meteorite that was found in the mountains near Fukang, China in 2000. It is a pallasite—a type of stony–iron meteorite with olivine crystals. It is estimated to be 4.5 billion years old.

== History ==
In 2000, near Fukang, China, a Chinese dealer obtained a mass from Xinjiang Province, China, with a weight of 1,003 kilograms (2,211 lb). He removed about 20 kilograms (44 lb) from the main mass, and in February 2005, the meteorite was taken to the Tucson Gem and Mineral Show, where it was seen by Dr. Dante Lauretta, a professor of Planetary Science and Cosmochemistry at the University of Arizona.

Subsequently, the mass was investigated at the Southwest Meteorite Center, Lunar and Planetary Laboratory, University of Arizona in Tucson, Arizona by Dr. Lauretta and a team of research scientists including Dolores Hill, Marvin Killgore, Daniella DellaGiustina, and Dr. Yulia Goreva, and joined by Dr. Ian Franchi of Open University.

== Classification and composition ==
The Fukang pallasite contains large, gem quality olivine, or peridot, in a nickel-iron matrix. The olivines vary in shape from rounded to angular, many are fractured and they range in size from less than five millimetres to several centimetres. The main mass contains several regions of massive olivine clusters up to eleven centimetres (4.3 inches) in diameter with thin metal veins. Fo_{86.4} with molar Fe/Mg = 0.1367, Fe/Mn = 40.37, and Ni = 0.03 wt%. The metal matrix is mostly kamacite with an average nickel content of 6.98 wt%. Vermicular sulfide (troilite) is present in some olivine.
Oxygen isotopes: δ^{18O} 2.569 ‰, δ^{17O} 1.179 ‰, ∆1 7O = −0.157 ‰.

== Specimens ==
A section weighing 31 kilograms (68 lb; 4.9 st) of type specimen is on deposit at the University of Arizona. Marvin Killgore holds an additional section weighing the same amount, as well as the balance of the main mass.

In April 2008, Bonhams offered the main mass for auction at their Manhattan auction. Bonhams expected to fetch US$2,000,000, but the lot remained unsold. A "window" area of 19 by 36 inches (480 mm × 910 mm) was cut and polished to provide a view into the gem areas of the meteorite.

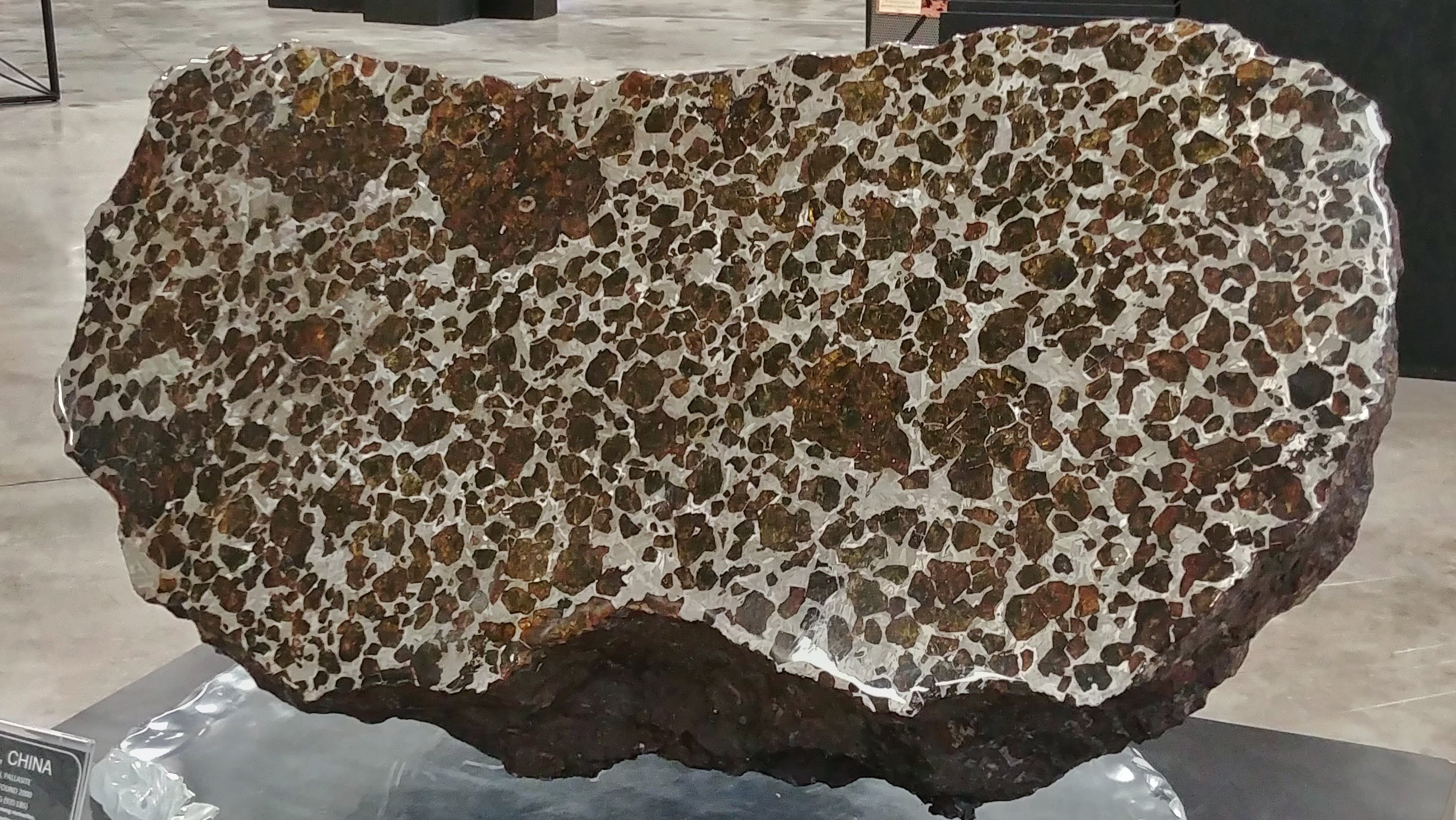
The main mass, viewed from the polished side.

== See also ==
- Glossary of meteoritics
