= Aeolus A60 =

Subcompact sedan

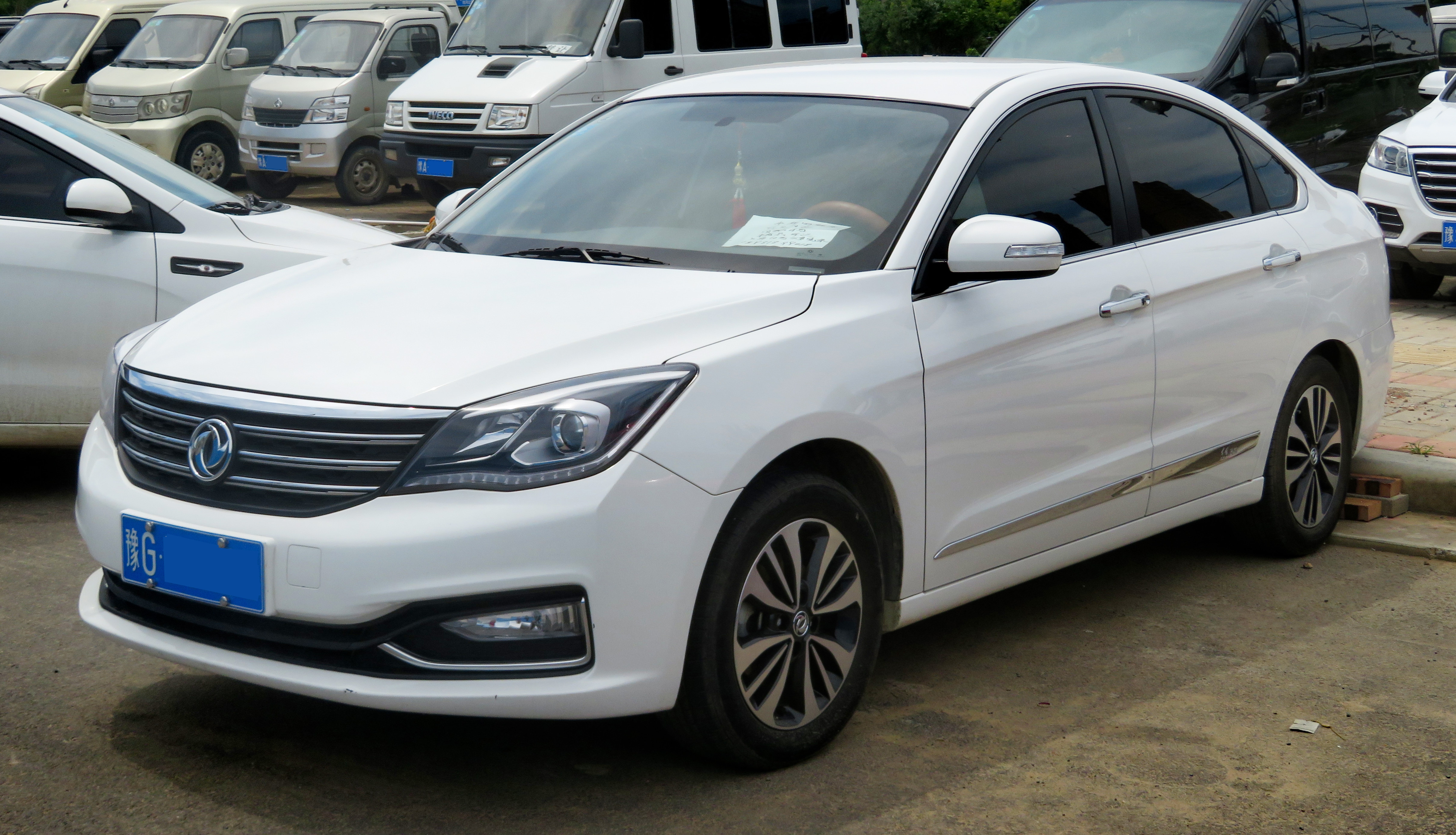

Overview
- Also called: Aeolus A60 EV (electric version); Aeolus E70 (facelift electric version); Evolute i-Pro (Russia)
- Production: 2011–present
- Model years: 2012–present
- Assembly: China

Body and chassis
- Class: Subcompact car (B)
- Layout: Front-engine, front-wheel-drive
- Platform: Nissan B platform
- Related: Nissan Sylphy (G11); Dongfeng Fengxing Jingyi S50

Powertrain
- Engine: 1.4 L DFMA14T I4 (turbo petrol) (from 2015); 1.5 L DFMA15 I4 (petrol 1.6 L HR16DE I4 (petrol); 2.0 L MR20DE I4 (petrol)
- Electric motor: A60 EV Concept: 70 kW (95 PS; 94 hp) synchronous motor, 226 N⋅m (167 lb⋅ft); 2017: 90 kW (120 PS; 120 hp) synchronous motor (Dongfeng E60); 2017: 100 kW (140 PS; 130 hp) synchronous motor (Dongfeng E70 (2017)); 2019-: 110 kW (150 PS; 150 hp) synchronous motor (Dongfeng E70 (2019))
- Transmission: 5-speed manual 4-speed automatic (from 2015); CVT automatic (before 2015)
- Battery: 2017: 49 kWh lithium-ion battery; 2017: 43.2-52.99 kWh lithium-ion battery; 2019-: 50.8-61.3 kWh lithium-ion battery

Dimensions
- Wheelbase: 2,700 mm (106.3 in)
- Length: 4,680 mm (184.3 in)
- Width: 1,720 mm (67.7 in)
- Height: 1,515 mm (59.6 in)

The Aeolus A60 is a subcompact sedan produced by Dongfeng Motor Corporation under the Dongfeng Fengshen sub-brand.

== Overview ==
The Aeolus A60 sedan debuted during the 2011 Guangzhou Auto Show and production started in December 2011, with the A60 being listed on the market in March 2012.

The Dongfeng Fengshen A60 compact sedan shares the same platform as the later introduced Fengxing Jingyi S50 compact sedan with both cars based on the Nissan Sylphy produced by the Dongfeng-Nissan joint venture in China.

The Dongfeng Fengshen A60 sits above the cheaper yet similarly sized Fengshen S30 subcompact sedan and Fengshen H30 compact hatchback.

A second facelift completely changing the front DRG styling was released placing the Fengshen A60 sedan more inline with other Dongfeng Fengshen products.

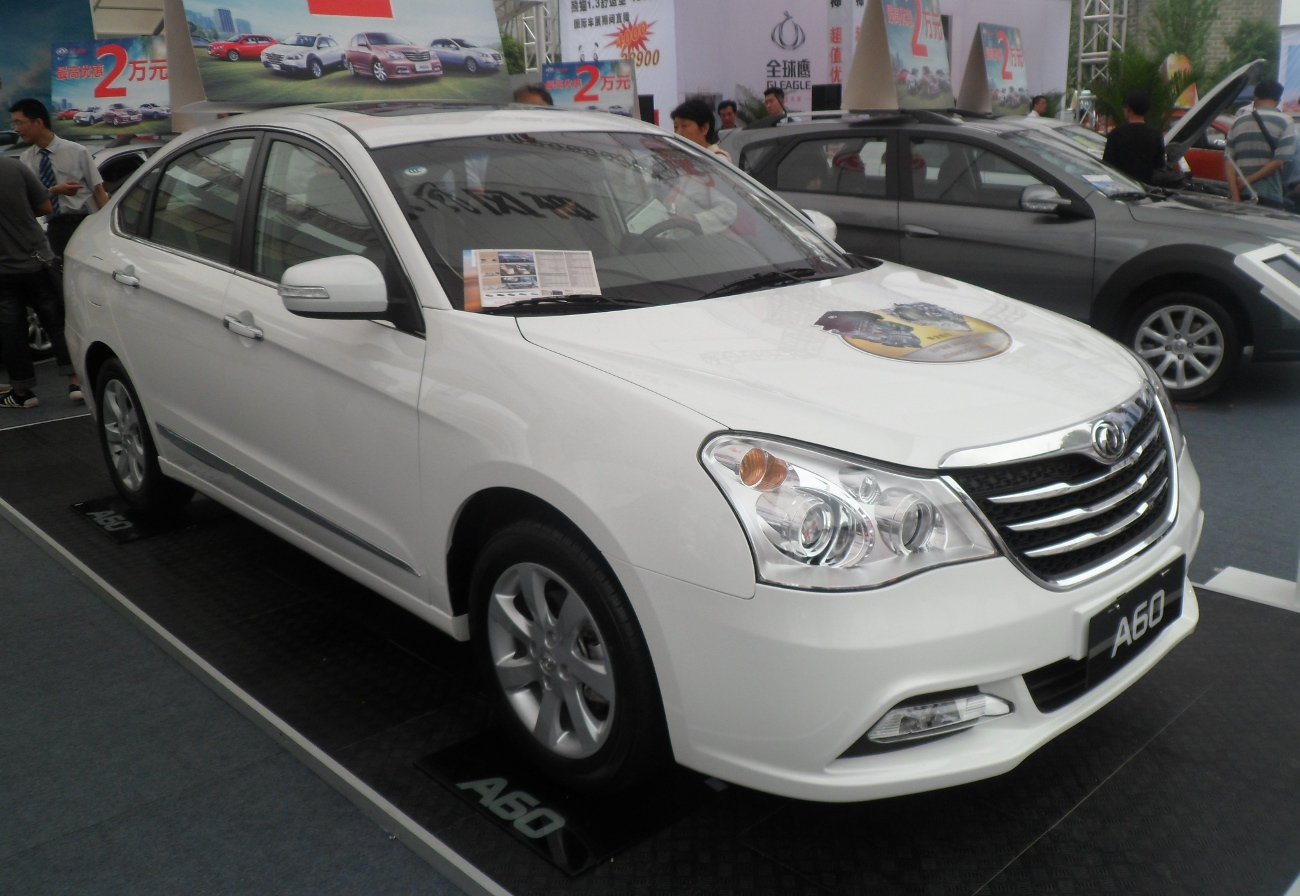
Dongfeng Fengshen A60

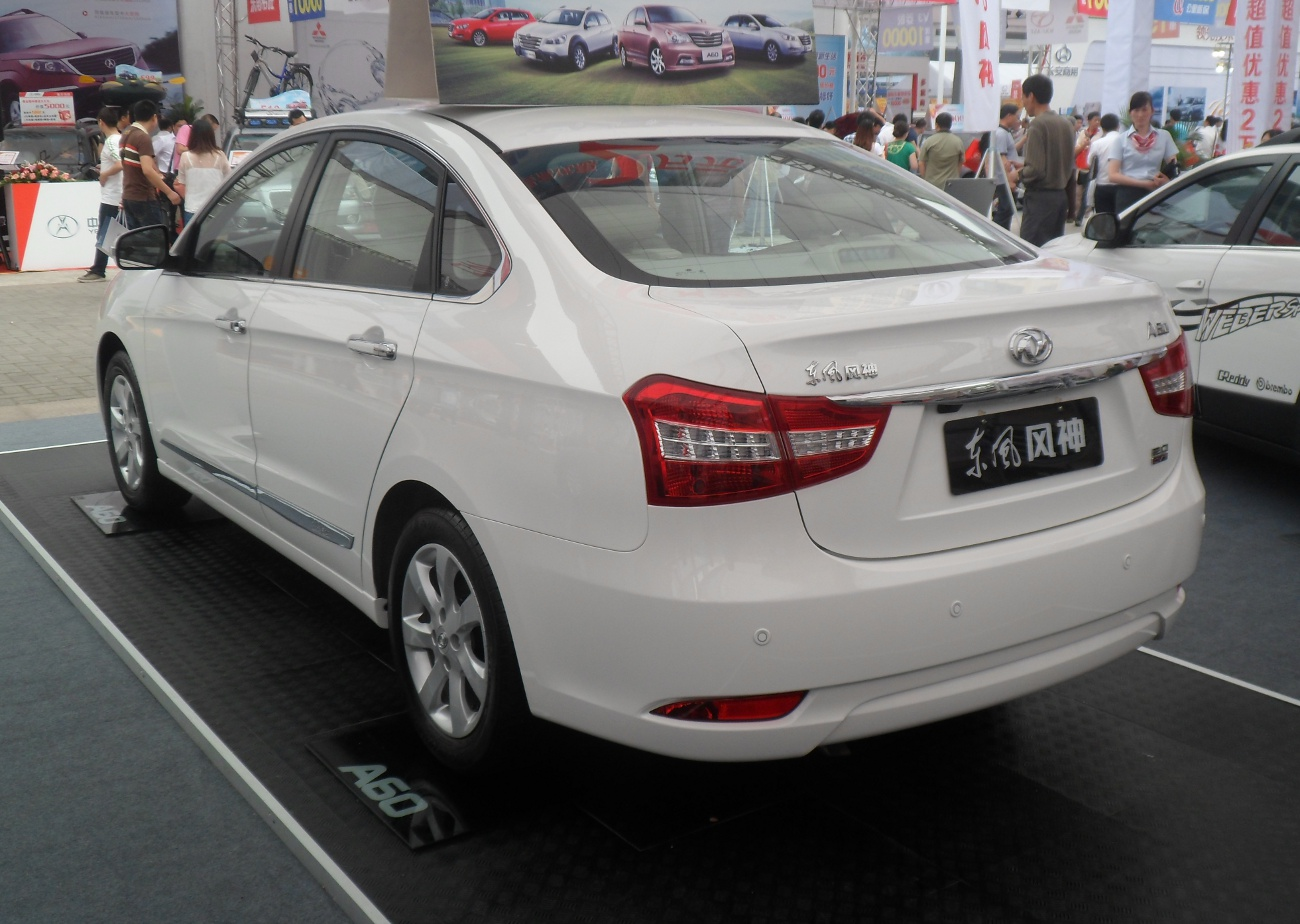
Dongfeng Fengshen A60

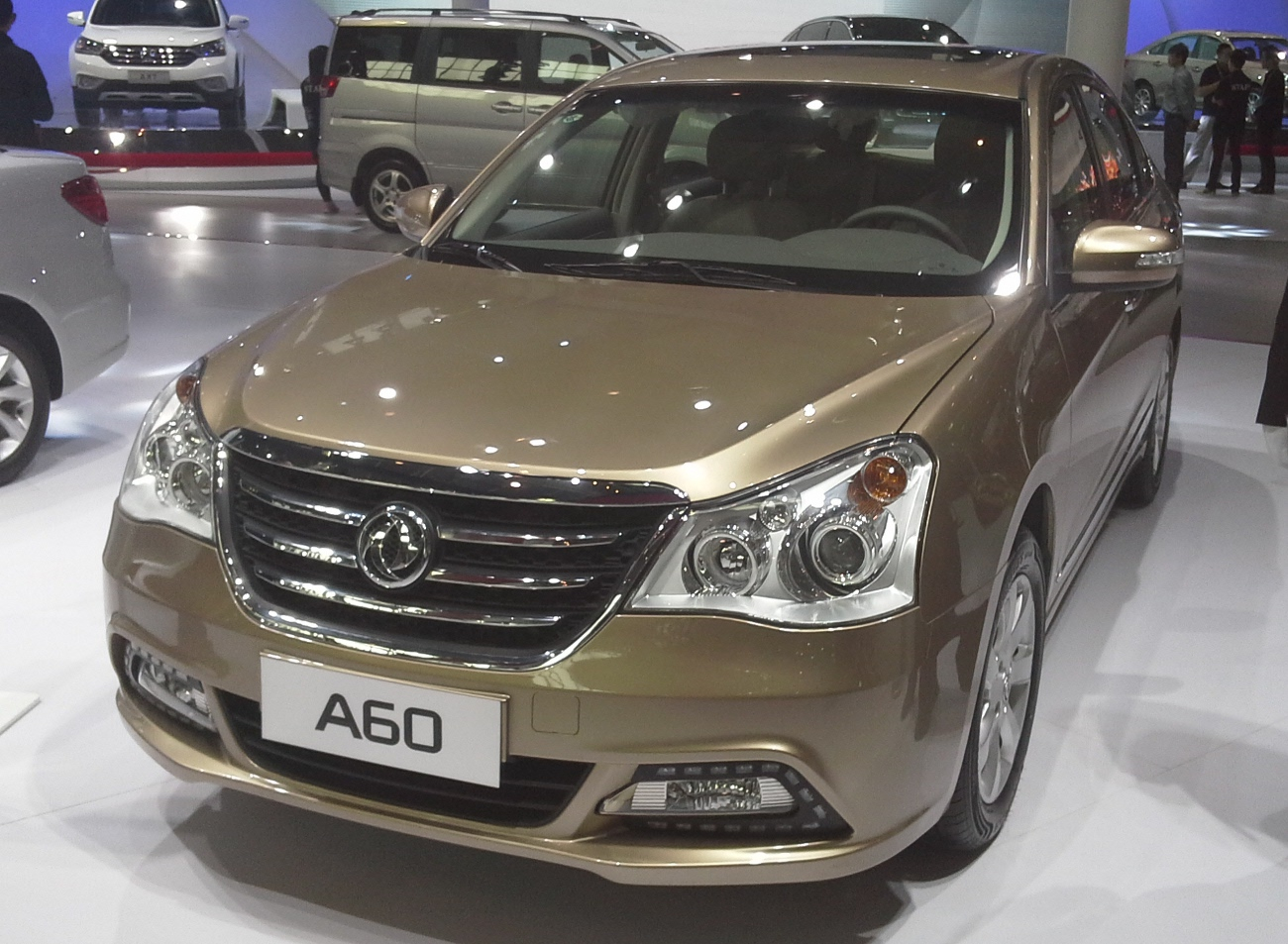
Dongfeng Fengshen A60 facelift

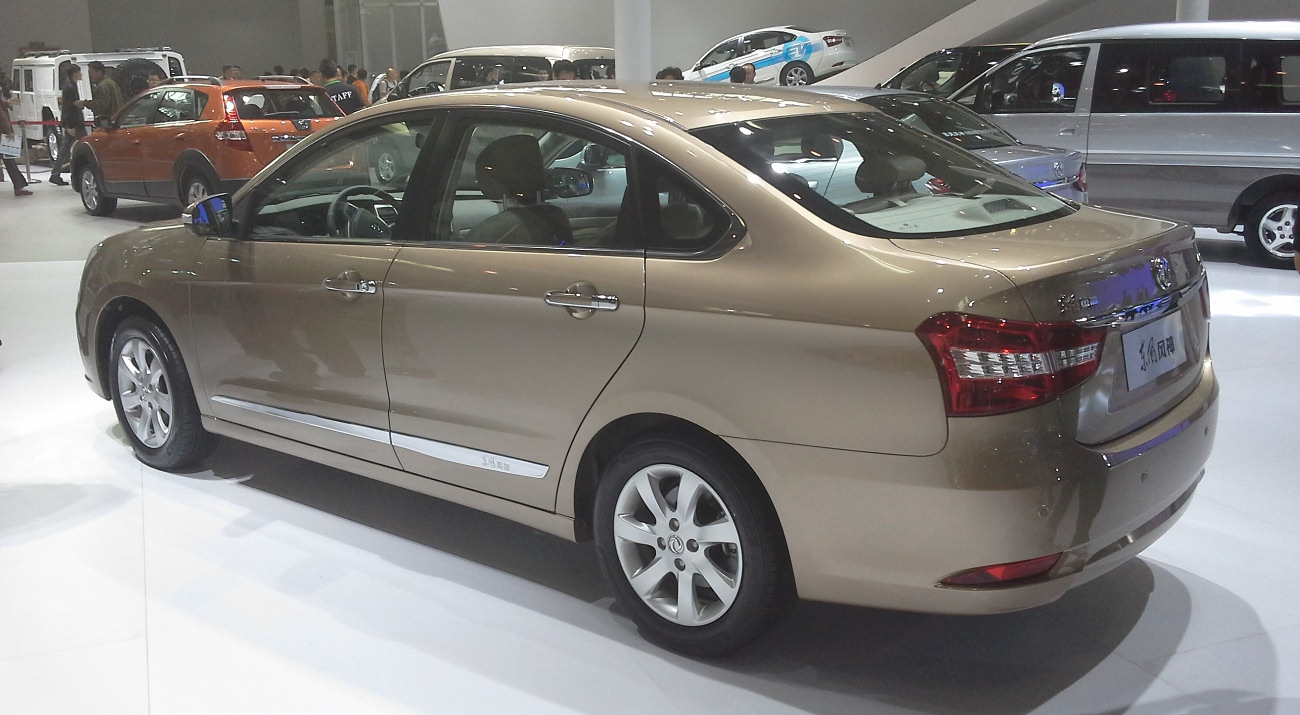
Dongfeng Fengshen A60 facelift

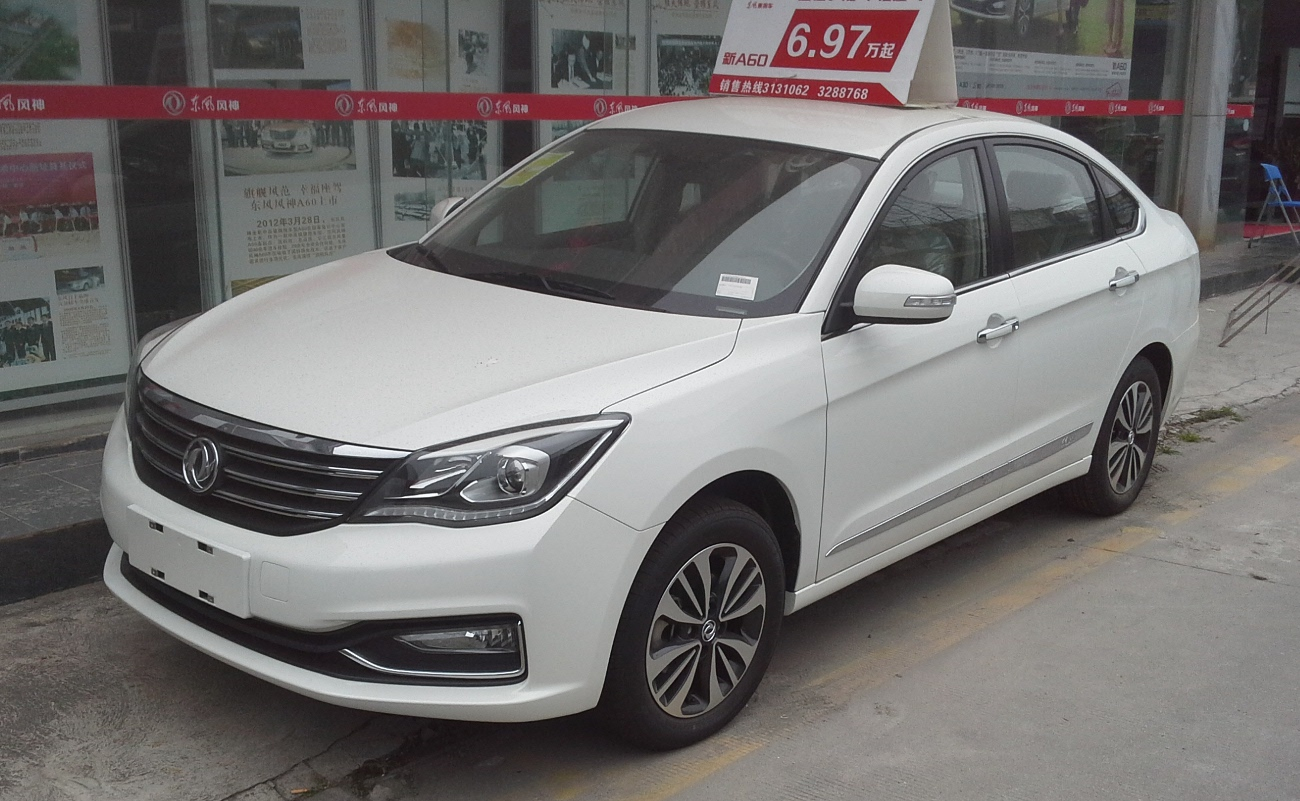
Dongfeng Fengshen A60 second facelift

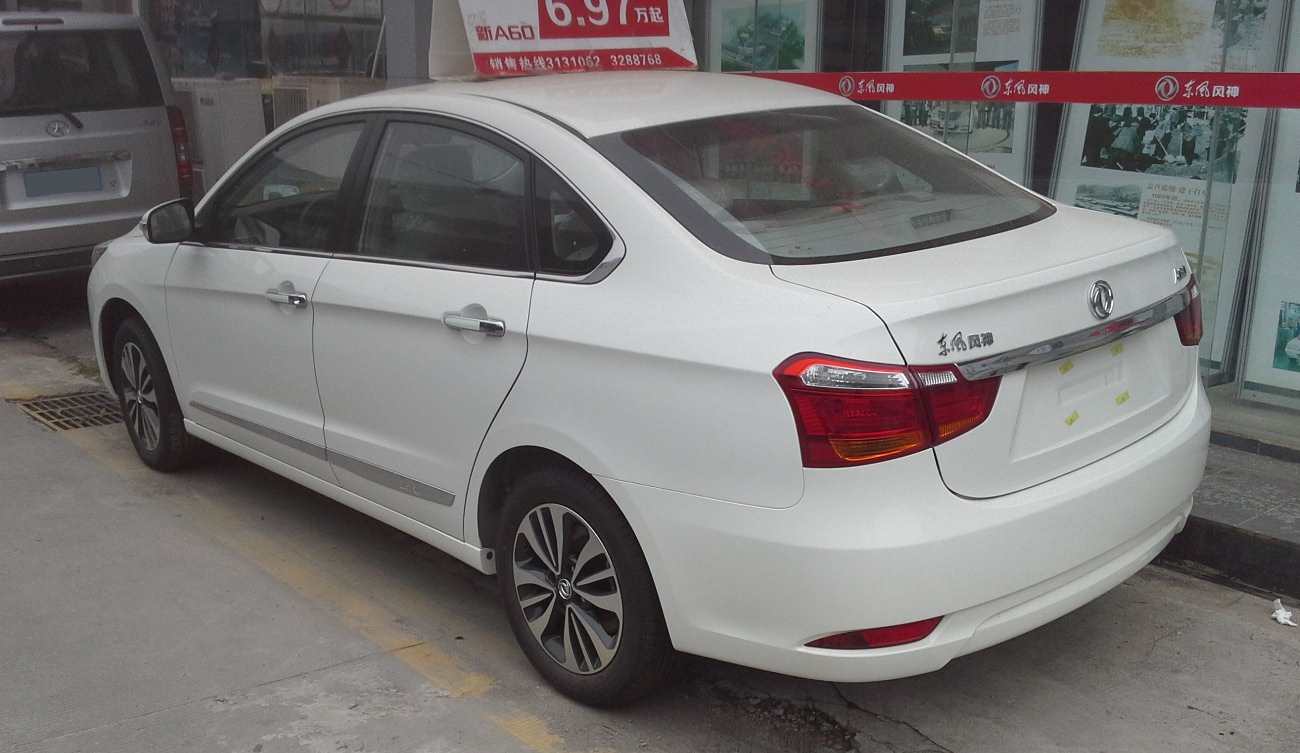
Dongfeng Fengshen A60 second facelift

== Electric variants ==
=== Dongfeng Fengshen A60 EV ===
Dongfeng revealed the Fengshen A60 EV alongside the 2015 Fengshen A60 facelift in October 2015. The Fengshen A60 EV is based on the pre-facelift Fengshen A60 sedan, and has a range of 200 kilometres (120 mi) and a 130 km/h (81 mph) top speed with electric motor producing 95 hp (71 kW; 96 PS) and 226 N⋅m (167 lb⋅ft; 23 kg⋅m) of torque. The Dongfeng Fengshen A60 EV was renamed to Dongfeng Fengshen E70 after the facelift placing the E70 inline with the 2015 facelift of the petrol-powered A60.

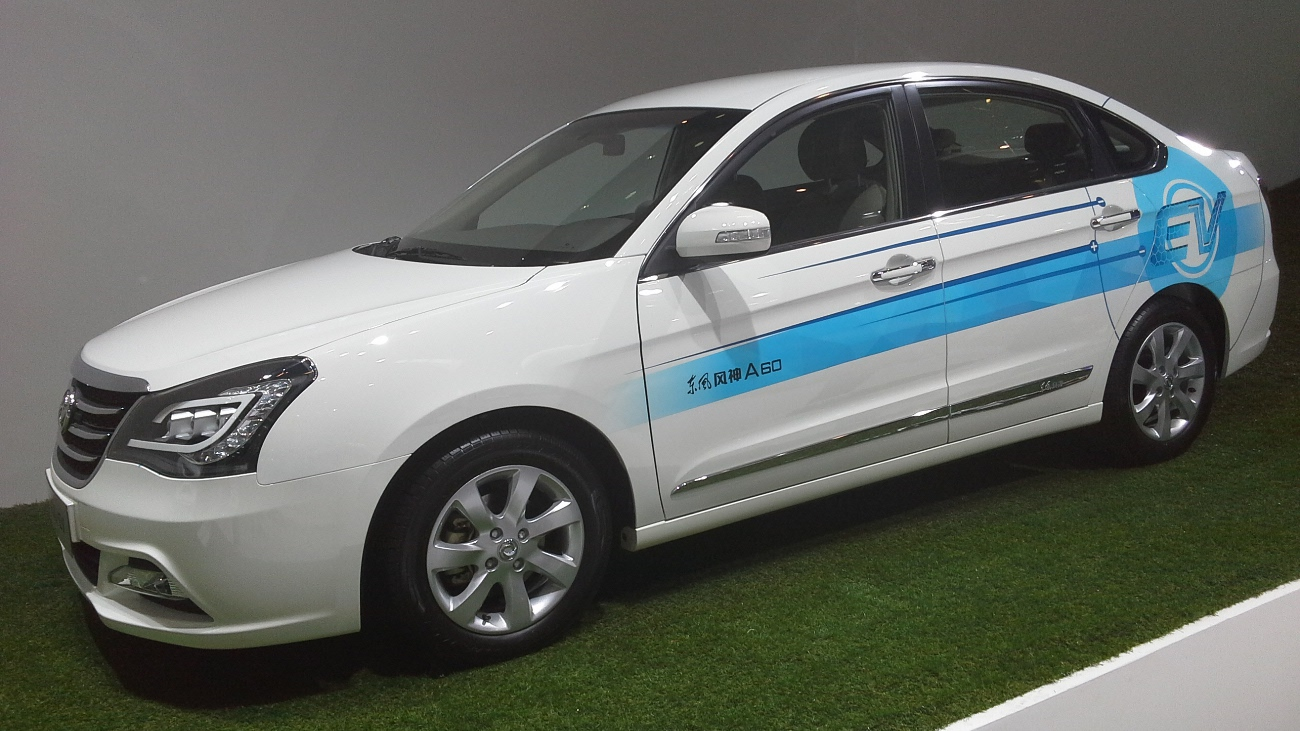
Dongfeng Fengshen A60 EV Concept

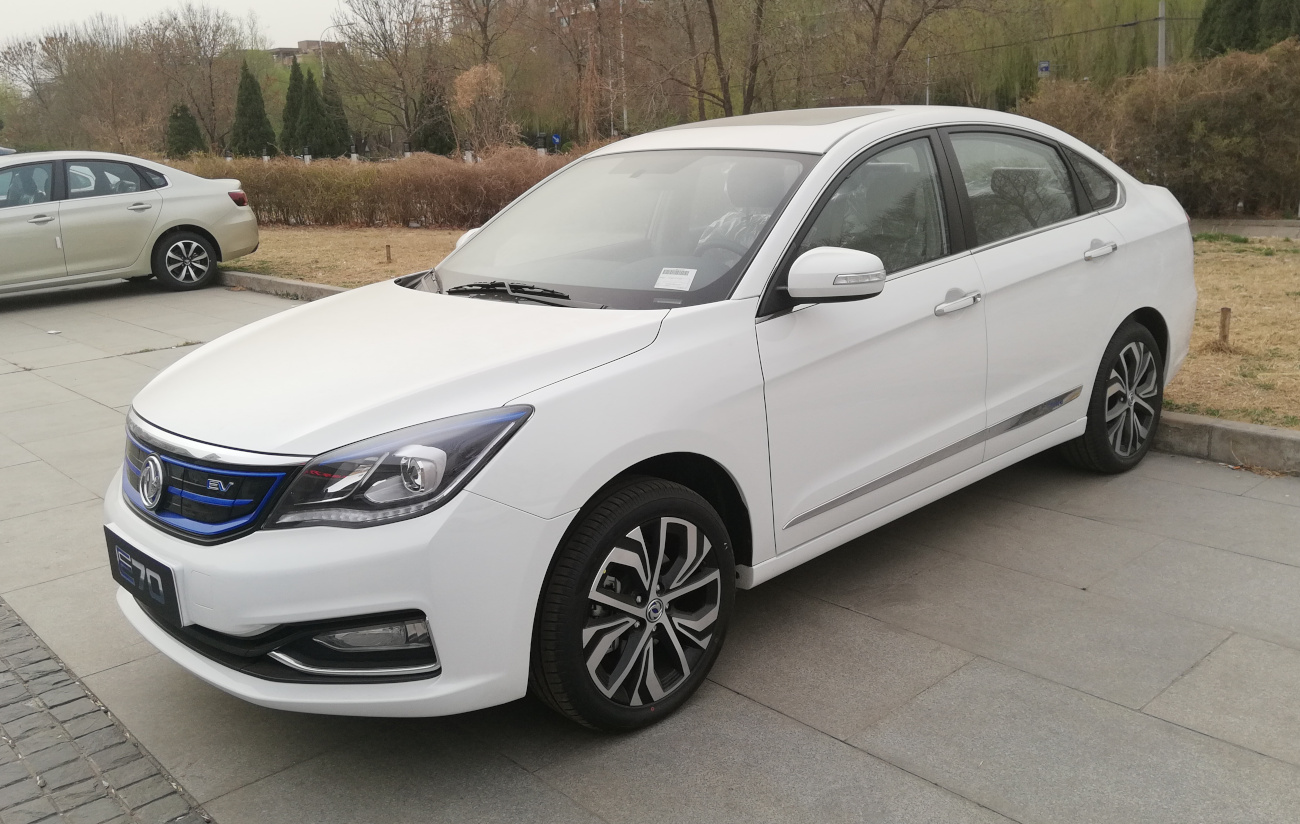
Aeolus (Dongfeng Fengshen) E70

=== Aeolus E70 ===
The Dongfeng Fengshen E70 received a facelift in 2019 and was revealed during the 2019 Shanghai Auto Show. The facelift sets the appearance of the EV further apart from the Fengshen A60 petrol sedan, and now carries the nameplate of the revised English brand name, Aeolus, in the rear.

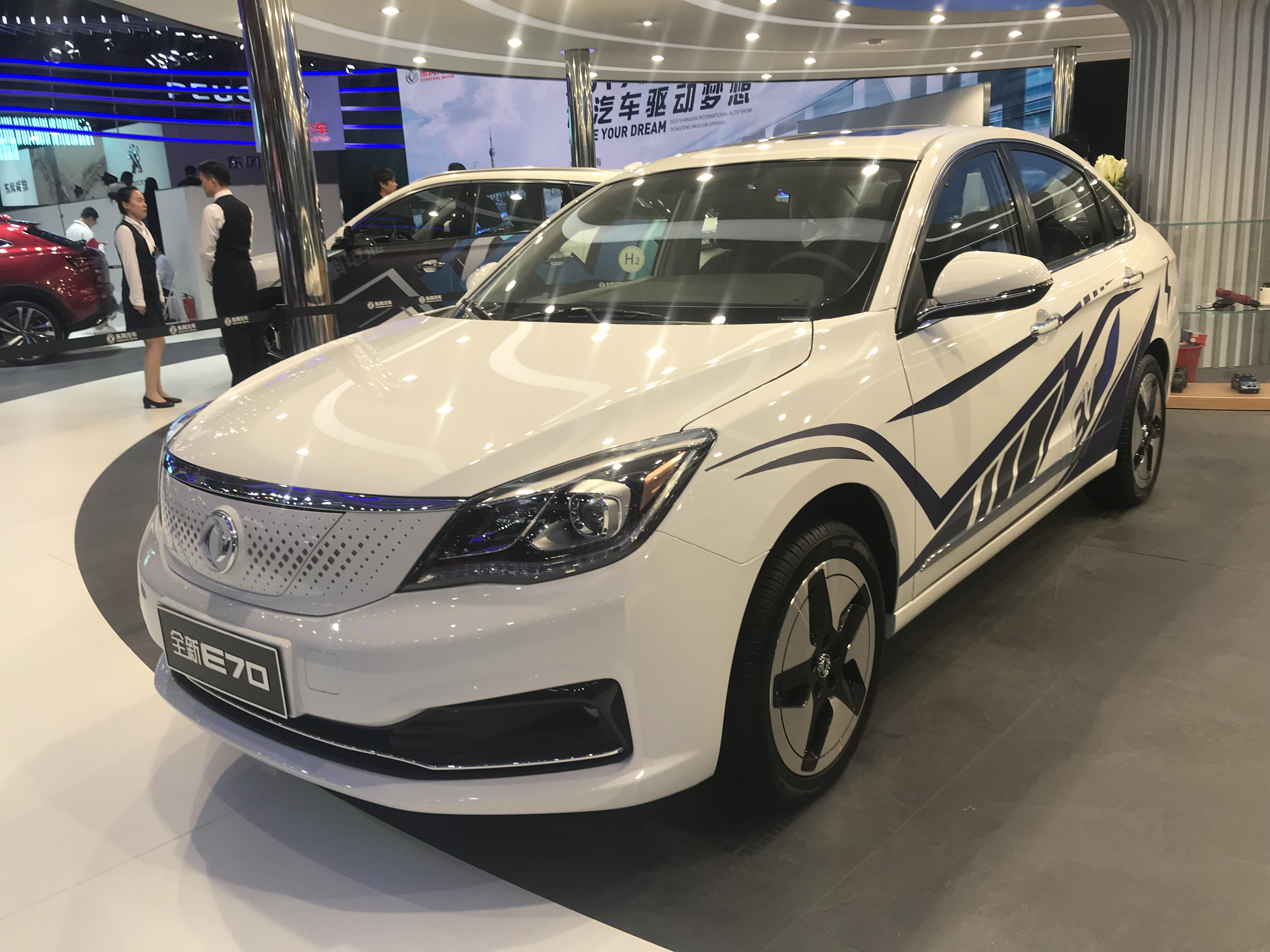
Aeolus E70 front

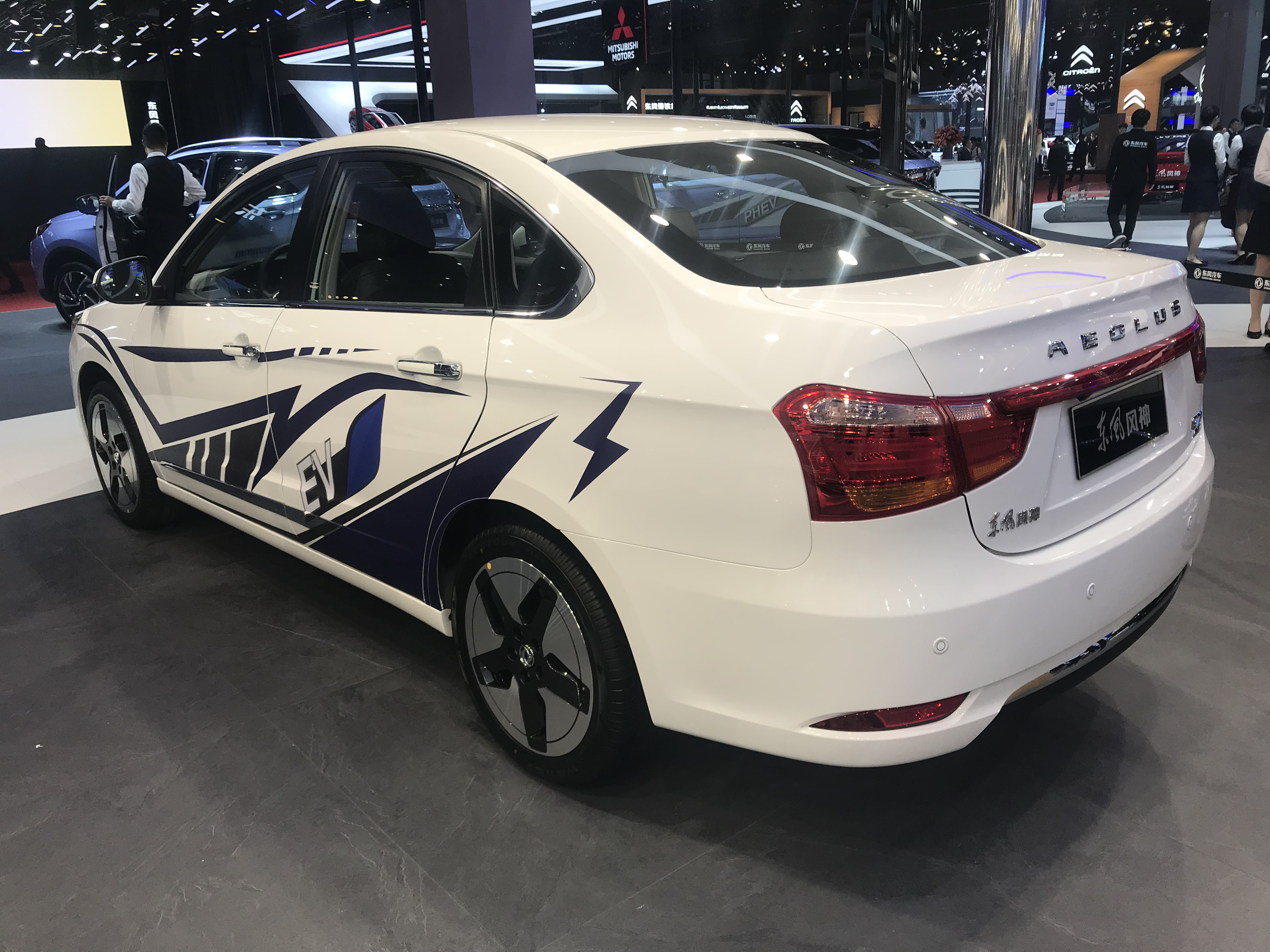
Aeolus E70 rear

=== Aeolus E70 Pro ===
Another major update was launched in August 2022 named the Aeolus E70 Pro, introducing restyled front and rear bumpers to the overall design. The maximum power output of the E70 Pro is 110 kW with only single motor 2-wheel-drive models available, capable of a CLTC range of 412 km. DC/AC charging is also supported, with 30% to 80% state of charge completed within 30 minutes.

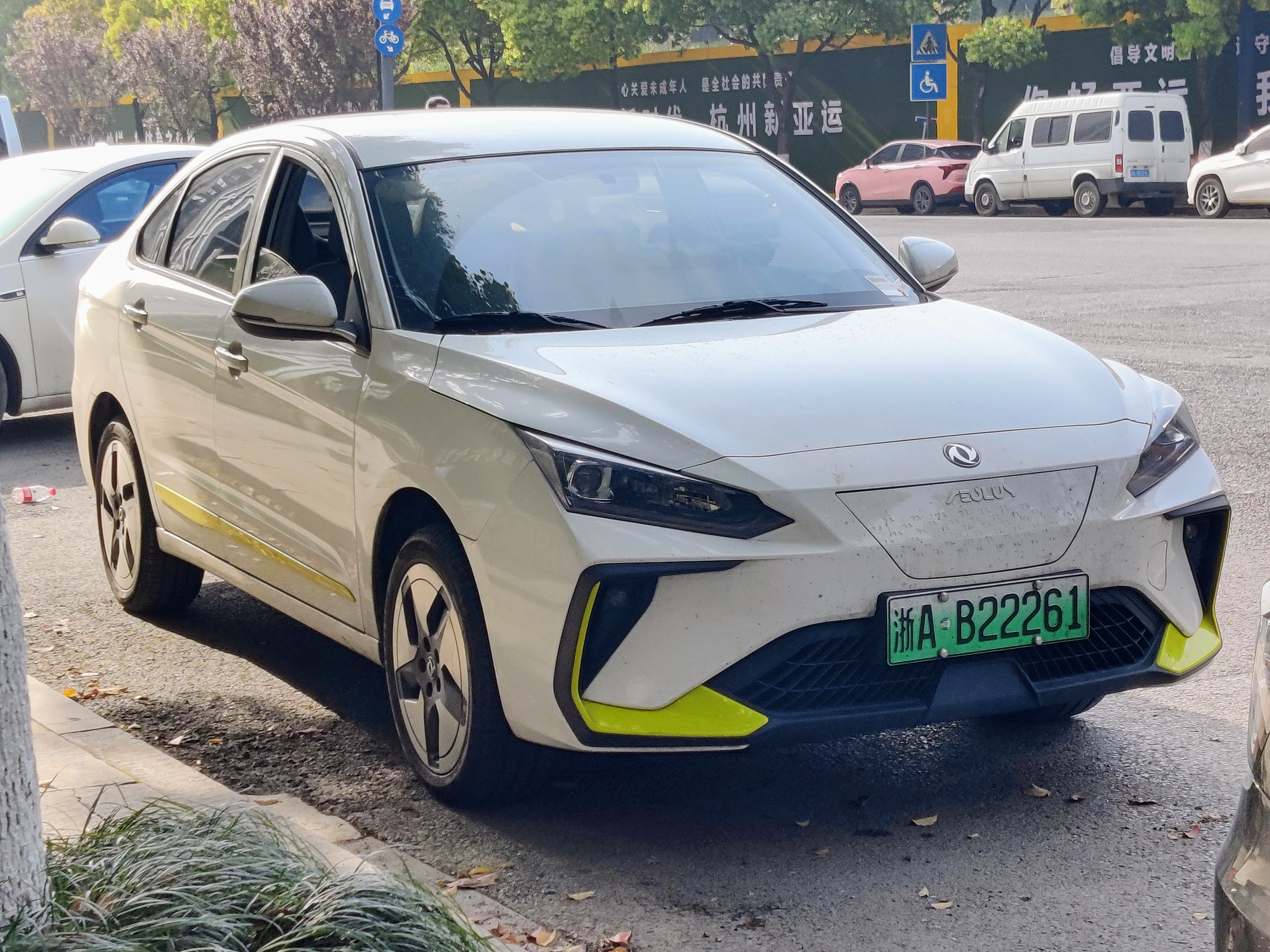
Aeolus E70 Pro front

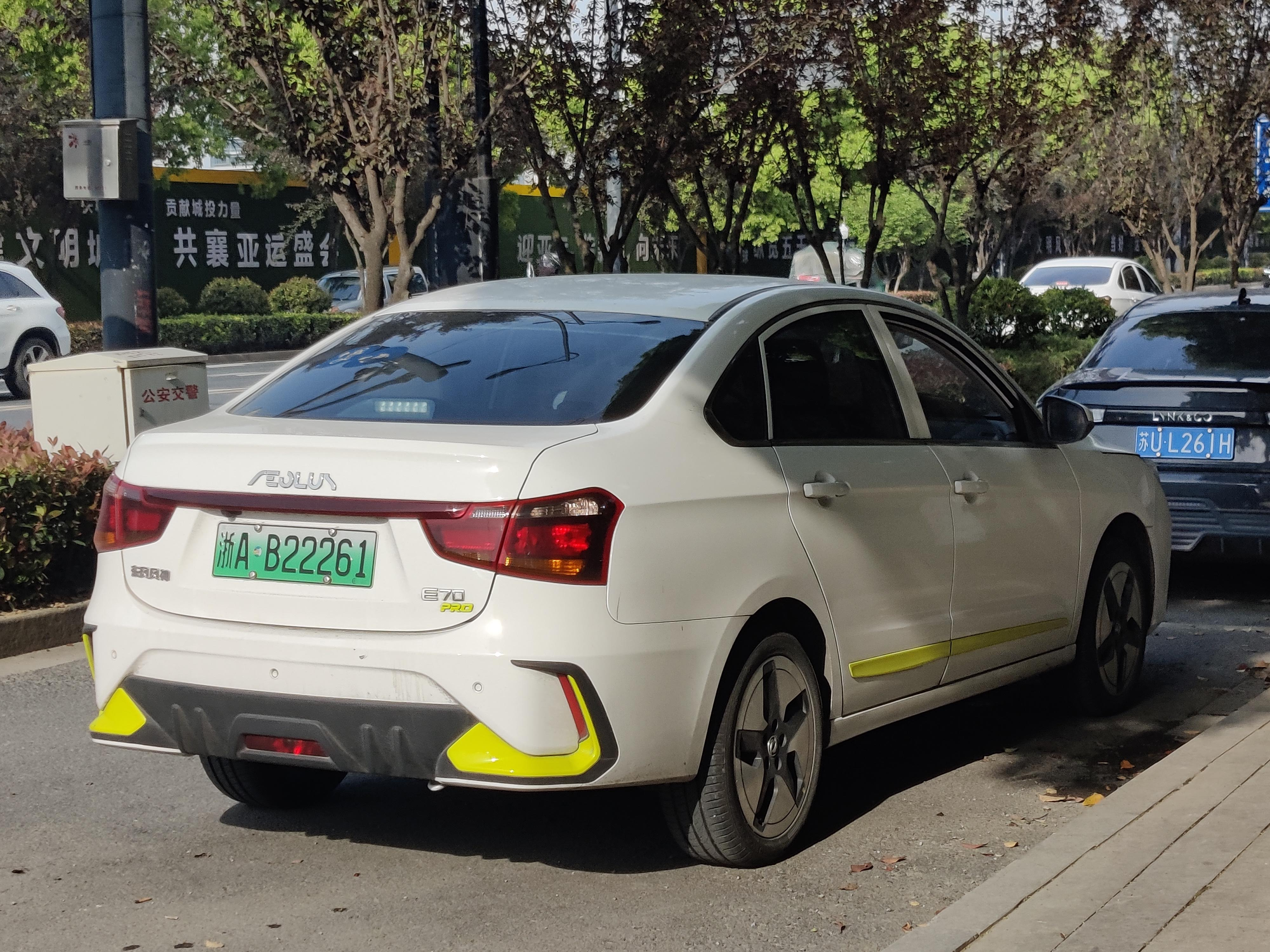
Aeolus E70 Pro rear

== Sales ==
Year	China
Year	E70
2022	74,472
2023	27,689
2024	15,467
2025	4,483
