= Fukang =

Fukang 阜康市 (Chinese) فۇكاڭ شەھىرى (Uyghur) فۋكاڭ قالاسى (Kazakh)
- County-level city
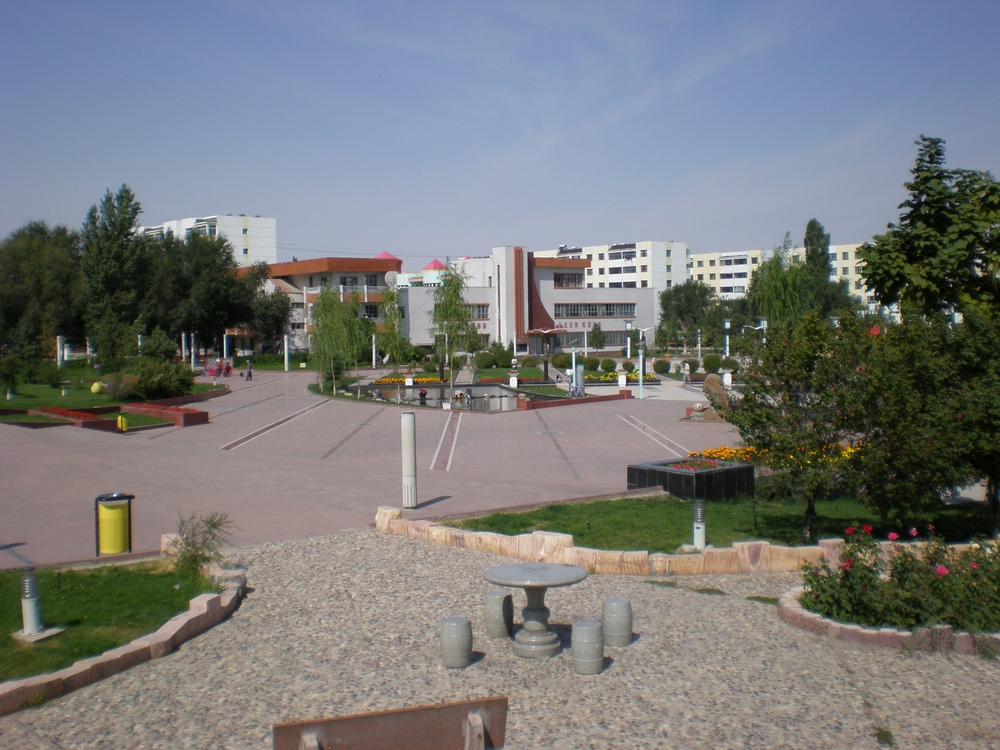
- Central square in Fukang City

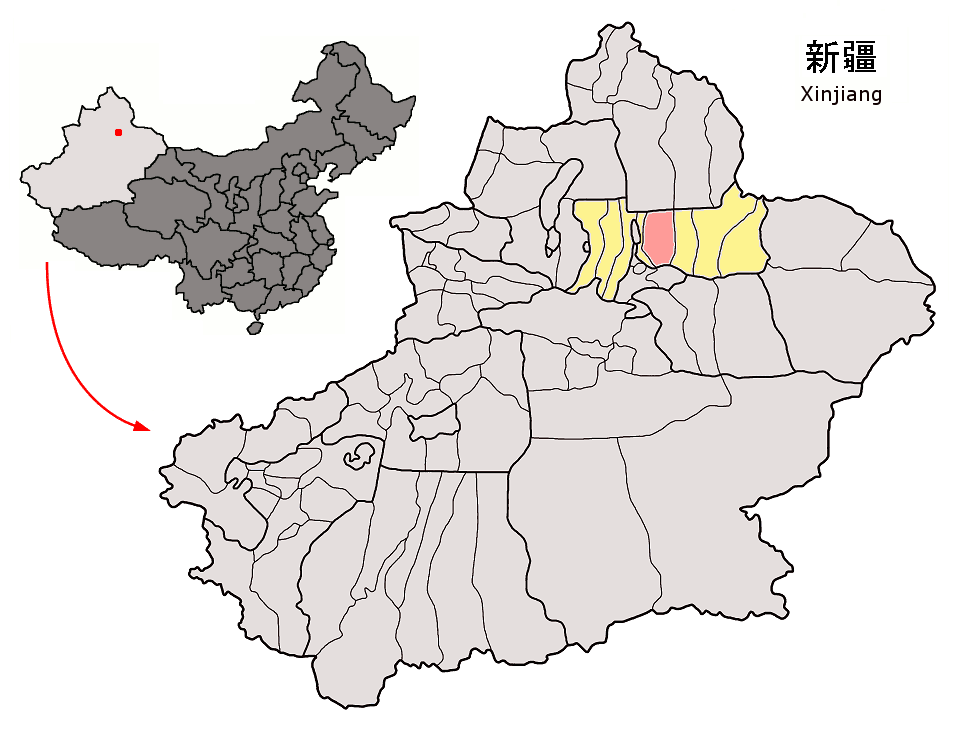
- Location of Fukang (red) in Changji Prefecture (yellow) and Xinjiang

- Location in Xinjiang Fukang (China)
- Coordinates: 44°09′53″N 87°57′13″E
- Country: China
- Autonomous region: Xinjiang
- Autonomous prefecture: Changji
- Township-level divisions: 3 Subdistricts; 4 towns; 1 township; 2 ethnic townships
- Municipal seat: Bofeng Subdistrict

Area
  - Total: 11,726 km^{2} (4,527 sq mi)

Population (2020)
  - Total: 181,144
  - Density: 15.448/km^{2} (40.010/sq mi)
- Time zone: UTC+8 (China Standard (Note: Locals in Xinjiang frequently observe UTC+6 (Xinjiang Time), 2 hours behind Beijing.))
- Website: www.fk.gov.cn

Fukang

Chinese name
- Chinese: 阜康
Transcriptions
Standard Mandarin
- Hanyu Pinyin: Fùkāng
other Mandarin
- Xiao'erjing: فُ‌کَانْ

Uyghur name
- Uyghur: فۇكاڭ
Transcriptions
- Latin Yëziqi: Fukang
- Yengi Yeziⱪ: Fukang
- SASM/GNC: Fukang
- Siril Yëziqi: Фукаң

Fukang is a county-level city in Xinjiang Uygur Autonomous Region, China. Its area is 11,726 km^{2} (4,527 sq mi) and its population in 2007 was reported as approximately 1.5 million. Fukang is located in Northern Xinjiang in Changji Hui Autonomous Prefecture, north of Ürümqi.

== History ==
As early as the Han and Tang dynasties, Fukang was an important stopover on the ancient Silk Road. The Qianlong Emperor of the Qing dynasty established it as a county in 1776. Its status was changed to a city in November 1992.

== Subdivisions ==
Fukang is made up of 3 subdistricts, 4 towns, 1 township, and 2 ethnic townships.

Name	Simplified Chinese	Hanyu Pinyin	Uyghur (UEY)	Uyghur Latin (ULY)	Administrative division code	Notes
Subdistricts
Bofeng Subdistrict	博峰街道	Bófēng Jiēdào	بوفېڭ كوچا باشقارمىسى	bofëng yoli kocha bashqarmisi	652302001	
Fuxin Subdistrict	阜新街道	Fùxīn Jiēdào	فۇشىن كوچا باشقارمىسى	fushin yoli kocha bashqarmisi	652302002	
Zhundong Subdistrict (Eastern Dzungaria Subdistrict)	准东街道	Zhǔndōng Jiēdào	شەرقىي جۇڭغار كوچا باشقارمىسى	sherqiy jungghar kocha bashqarmisi	652302003	
Towns
Ganhezi Town	甘河子镇	Gānhézǐ Zhèn	گەنخېزا بازىرى	genxëza baziri	652302100	
Chengguan Town	城关镇	Chéngguān Zhèn	چىڭگۈەن بازىرى	chinggüen baziri	652302101	
Jiuyunjie Town	九运街镇	Jiǔyùnjiē Zhèn	جيۇيۇنگەي بازىرى	jyuyungey baziri	652302102	
Ziniquanzi Town	滋泥泉子镇	Zīníquánzǐ Zhèn	زىنىچۈەنزى بازىرى	zinichüenzi baziri	652302103	
Township
Shuimogou Township	水磨沟乡	Shuǐmògōu Xiāng	شۇيموگۇ يېزىسى	shuymogu yëzisi	652302202	
Ethnic townships
Shanghugou Kazakh Ethnic Township	上户沟哈萨克民族乡	Shànghùgōu Hāsàkè Mínzúxiāng	شاڭخۇگۇ قازاق يېزىسى	shangxugu qazaq yëzisi	652302201	(Kazakh) شاڭحۋگۋ قازاق اۋىلى
Sangonghe Kazakh Ethnic Township	三工河哈萨克民族乡	Sāngōnghé Hāsàkè Mínzúxiāng	سەنگۇڭخې قازاق يېزىسى	sengungxë qazaq yëzisi	652302203	(Kazakh) سانگۇڭحى قازاق اۋىلى

== Climate ==
Climate data for Fukang, elevation 547 m (1,795 ft), (1991–2020 normals, extremes 1981–2010)
Month	Jan	Feb	Mar	Apr	May	Jun	Jul	Aug	Sep	Oct	Nov	Dec	Year
Record high °C (°F)	8.1 (46.6)	4.5 (40.1)	25.2 (77.4)	34.7 (94.5)	38.0 (100.4)	40.2 (104.4)	40.9 (105.6)	41.1 (106.0)	38.8 (101.8)	30.9 (87.6)	18.8 (65.8)	9.3 (48.7)	41.1 (106.0)
Mean daily maximum °C (°F)	−11.8 (10.8)	−6.8 (19.8)	6.2 (43.2)	20.5 (68.9)	26.8 (80.2)	31.6 (88.9)	33.0 (91.4)	31.8 (89.2)	26.1 (79.0)	16.6 (61.9)	3.6 (38.5)	−8.4 (16.9)	14.1 (57.4)
Daily mean °C (°F)	−16.2 (2.8)	−11.5 (11.3)	0.8 (33.4)	13.1 (55.6)	19.3 (66.7)	24.5 (76.1)	25.9 (78.6)	24.0 (75.2)	17.8 (64.0)	8.9 (48.0)	−1.5 (29.3)	−12.5 (9.5)	7.7 (45.9)
Mean daily minimum °C (°F)	−20.2 (−4.4)	−15.9 (3.4)	−4.0 (24.8)	6.5 (43.7)	12.2 (54.0)	17.8 (64.0)	19.3 (66.7)	17.0 (62.6)	10.8 (51.4)	3.3 (37.9)	−5.3 (22.5)	−16.0 (3.2)	2.1 (35.8)
Record low °C (°F)	−32.8 (−27.0)	−32.9 (−27.2)	−28.4 (−19.1)	−7.9 (17.8)	−2.2 (28.0)	7.2 (45.0)	9.1 (48.4)	4.3 (39.7)	−1.9 (28.6)	−9.2 (15.4)	−28.1 (−18.6)	−34.4 (−29.9)	−34.4 (−29.9)
Average precipitation mm (inches)	6.9 (0.27)	7.7 (0.30)	12.0 (0.47)	27.0 (1.06)	32.4 (1.28)	22.7 (0.89)	31.0 (1.22)	27.3 (1.07)	14.9 (0.59)	19.7 (0.78)	16.1 (0.63)	11.5 (0.45)	229.2 (9.01)
Average precipitation days (≥ 0.1 mm)	7.0	6.1	4.2	5.8	6.4	6.6	7.3	5.6	4.2	4.5	5.7	8.1	71.5
Average snowy days	13.6	10.9	5.4	1.4	0	0	0	0	0	0.9	6.2	13.6	52
Average relative humidity (%)	83	82	71	47	42	43	47	48	49	61	78	85	61
Mean monthly sunshine hours	79.2	117.8	217.7	267.4	312.2	311.1	314.9	306.0	276.3	233.3	132.2	67.2	2,635.3
Percentage possible sunshine	27	39	58	65	68	67	68	72	75	70	47	24	57
Source: China Meteorological Administration

== Economy ==
In 2007, Fukang City's GDP was 4.822 billion yuan, 2.3 times that of 2002, an average annual increase of 17.6%. Per capita GDP reached 30,000 yuan, 2.1 times that of 2002, an average annual increase of 16.5%.

Fukang's economy relies primarily on heavy industry, agriculture and tourism.

Among the tourist attractions in the area are Bogda Peak and the Heavenly Lake of Tianshan.

Bogeda Biosphere Reserve, in the east part of the Tianshan Mountains, was designated a member of UNESCO's Man and Biosphere reserve in 1990.

Irrigated agriculture in the Fukang is enabled by streams flowing from the Tian Shan mountains, as well as by the eastern branch of the Irtysh–Karamay–Ürümqi Canal, which crosses the Gurbantünggüt Desert, bringing to Fukang water from the Irtysh River.

== Transport ==
- China National Highway 216

== Special facts ==
In 2000 a 925 "gemstone meteorite", a pallasite meteorite known as Fukang meteorite, was found near Fukang. It is considered a large and a rare of meteorite. In 2008 the main mass was offered for sale at Bonhams for a value of US $2 million. However the lot remained unsold.
