= Bogda Shan =

Mountain range in China

Coordinates: 43°35′N 89°40′E

The Bogda Shan are east of Urumchi and north of Turfan.

The Bogda Shan (Mongolian: Богд Уул, Bogd Uul; simplified Chinese: 博格达山; traditional Chinese: 博格達山; pinyin: Bógédá shān) range is part of the Eastern Tian Shan mountains and located in Xinjiang, some 60 km east of Ürümqi. The topography of the area gradually increases from north to south. The elevation is between 1380 and 5445 m, with the largest relative relief up to 4065 m. The highest elevation is Bogda Peak, at 5,445 m.

Administratively, the range forms the border between Dabancheng District to the south and Fukang City and Jimsar County to the north. In all three units, irrigated agriculture is based on the water flowing in streams that starts in the Bogda Shan.

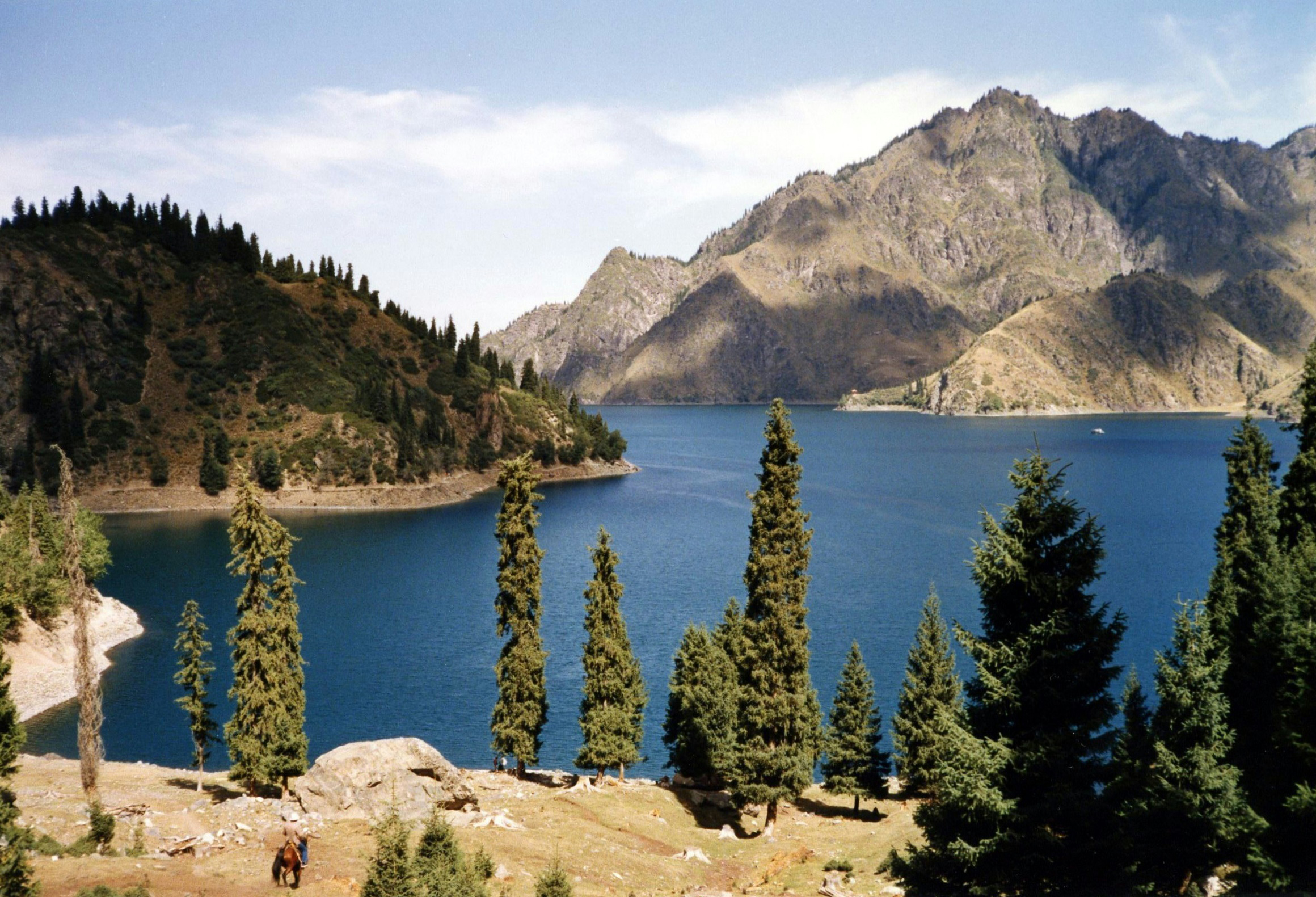
Tianchi Lake on the northern side of the Bogda Shan range

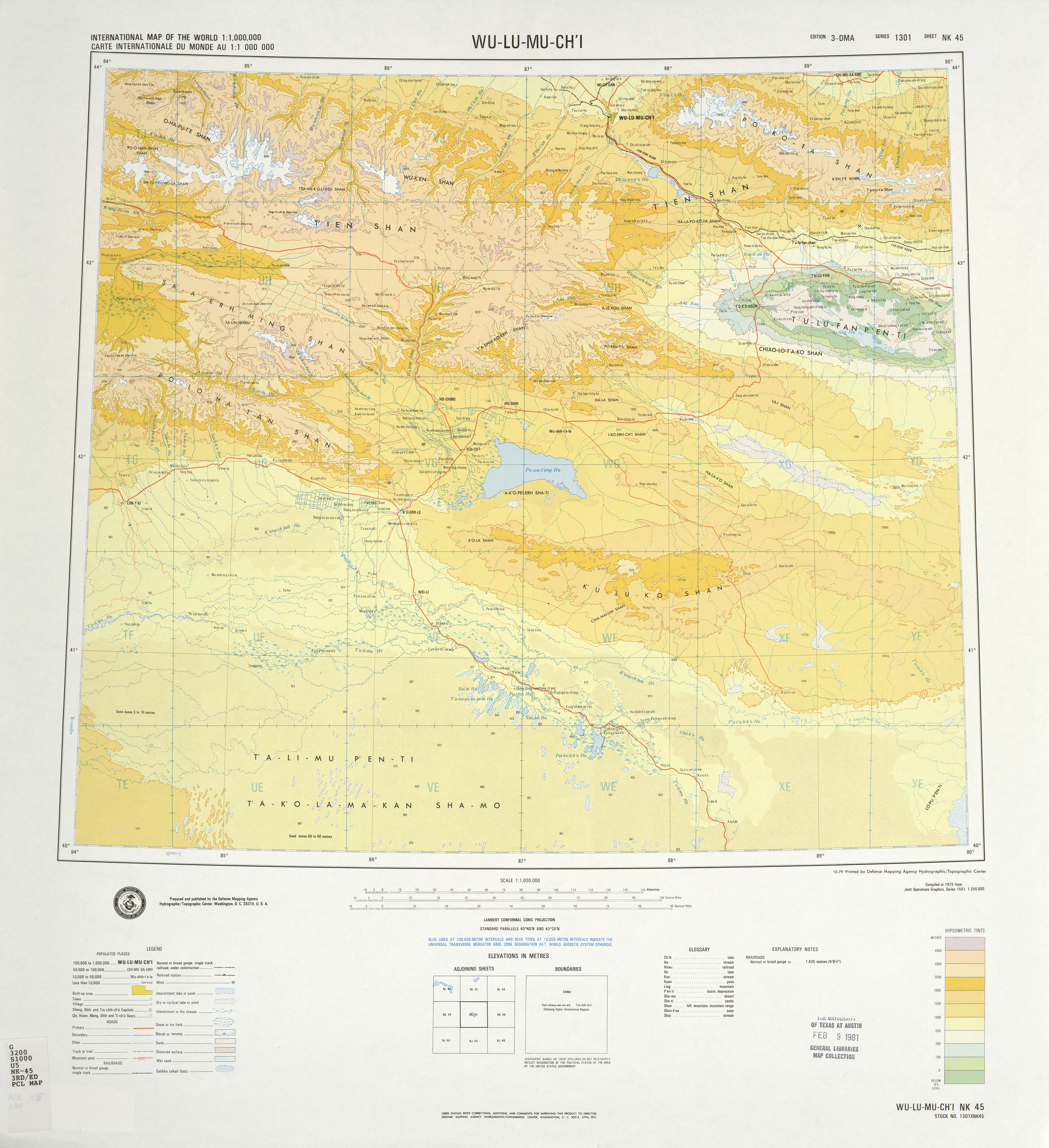
Map including Bogda Shan (labeled as PO-KO-TA SHAN) from the International Map of the World (1975)
