= AX3 =

AX3 or AX-3, may refer to:

- Axiom Mission 3 (Ax-3), a space mission for paying passengers
- Aeolus AX3, a subcompact crossover SUV
- AX-3: Interfight, a 1982 videogame; see List of Project EGG games
- AX-3 (character), a fictional character from Golgo 13; see List of Golgo 13 episodes
- Ax 3 Domaines, Ax-les-Thermes, Ariège, France; a winter sports resort

== See also ==
- AX (disambiguation)
