= Dead angle =

Dead angle is the blind-spot a car-driver isn't able to see in the mirrors without turning their head, and a battle term for an angle or space which cannot be seen or defended. It may also refer to:

- Dead Angle, a 1988 video game from Seibu Kaihatsu
- A location at Cheatham Hill in Kennesaw Mountain National Battlefield Park, once known as the "Dead Angle"
- "Dead Angle", a 1986 song by the Japanese band Saver Tiger
- The Dead Angle, a 1973 short story collection by Aleksandar Tišma
- "Dead Angle", an episode of the anime Golgo 13
- "The Dead Angle", a volume of the manga Monster
