= Aeolus Yixuan =

Compact sedan

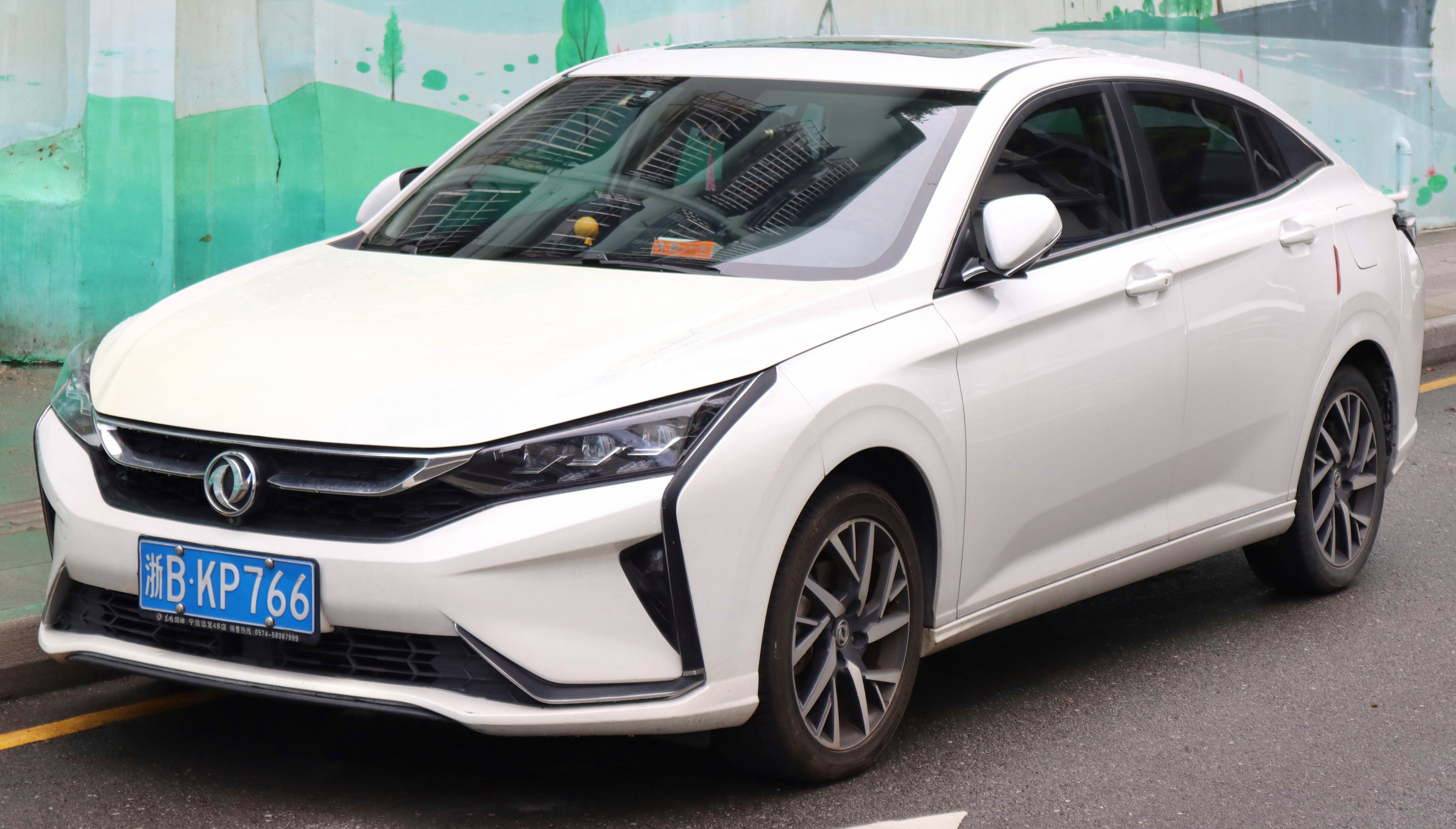

Overview
- Manufacturer: Aeolus (Dongfeng Motor Corporation)
- Also called: Aeolus D53; Fengshen D53; Fengshen Yixuan; Dongfeng Aeolus A30 (Egypt); Lamari Echo (Iran); Dongfeng Shine (Global)
- Production: 2019–present
- Model years: 2019–present
- Assembly: China: Wuhan; Iran: Khomeyn (Arian Pars Motor)

Body and chassis
- Class: Compact car (C)
- Body style: 4-door sedan/saloon
- Layout: Front-engine, front-wheel-drive
- Platform: CMP
- Related: Aeolus Yixuan Max; Aeolus Yixuan GS

Powertrain
- Engine: Petrol: 1.0 L DFM C10TDS I3 turbo; 1.5 L DFM C15TDR I4 turbo
- Electric motor: Permanent magnet synchronous motor (EV)
- Power output: 92 kW (125.1 PS; 123.4 hp) (C10TDS); 110 kW (149.6 PS; 147.5 hp) (C15TDR); 120 kW (163.2 PS; 160.9 hp) (EV)
- Transmission: 5-speed manual; 6-speed DCT; 1-speed direct-drive (EV)
- Battery: Li-ion battery: 47.7 kWh
- Electric range: 400 km (249 mi) (EV)

Dimensions
- Wheelbase: 2,680 mm (105.5 in)
- Length: 4,660 mm (183.5 in)
- Width: 1,812 mm (71.3 in)
- Height: 1,490 mm (58.7 in)
- Curb weight: 1,235 kg (200T); 1,273 kg (230T)

Chronology
- Predecessor: Dongfeng Fengshen L60; Dongfeng Fengshen A30

The Aeolus Yixuan is a compact sedan produced by Dongfeng Motor Corporation under the Aeolus sub-brand.

== Overview ==
Initially previewed by the 2018 Aeolus eπ Concept, the Aeolus Yixuan debuted during the 2019 Shanghai Auto Show as the D53. Yixuan being listed on 9 September 2019.

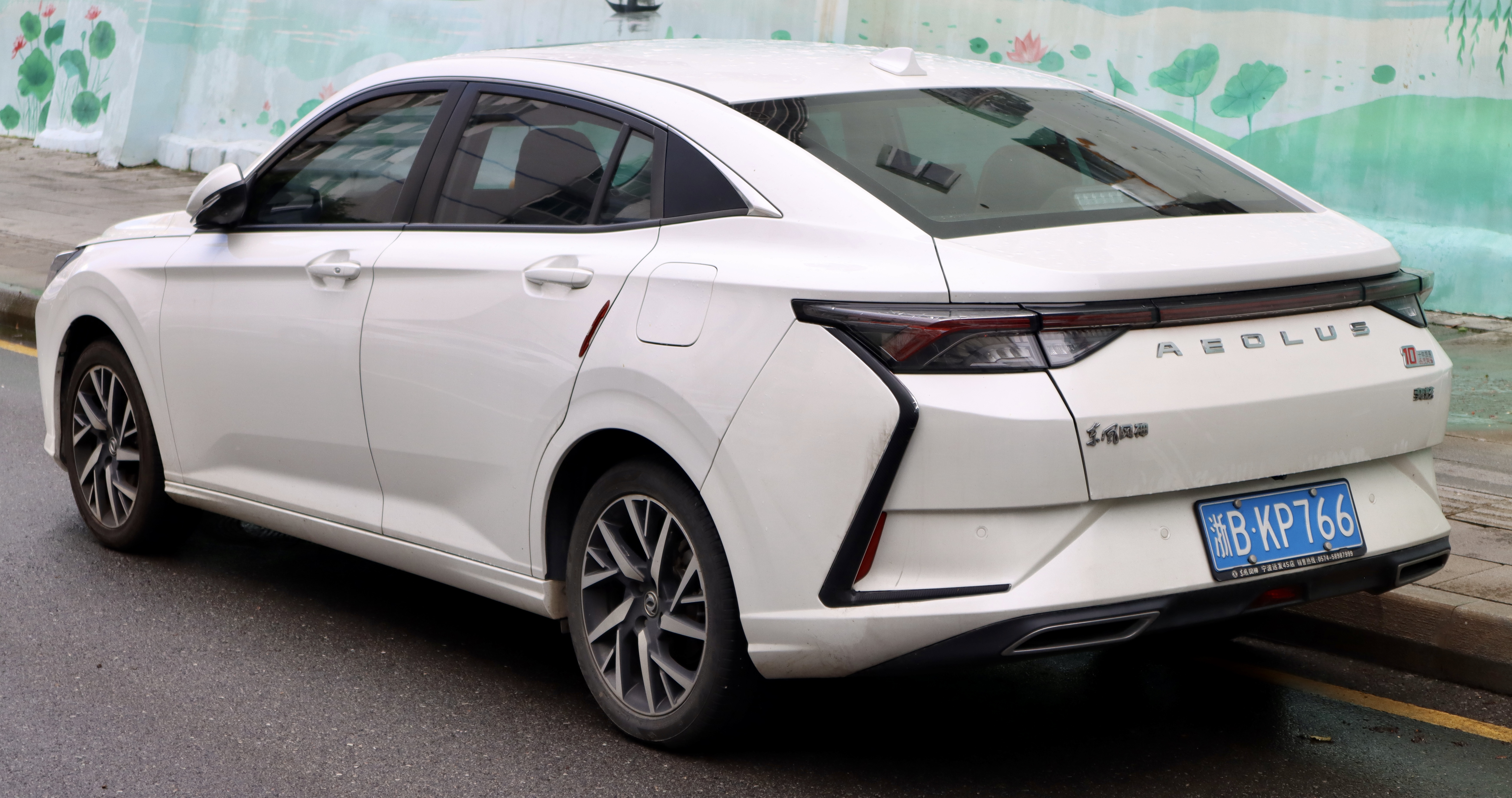
Aeolus Yixuan pre-facelift rear

The engine options of the Aeolus Yixuan includes a 1.0-litre inline-three petrol turbo engine and a 1.5-litre inline-four petrol turbo engine. The 1.0-litre turbocharged engine has maximum power of 125 hp (93 kW; 127 PS) with a peak torque of 196 N⋅m (145 lb⋅ft). The 1.5-litre turbocharged engine has maximum power of 147 hp (110 kW; 149 PS) with a peak torque of 230 N⋅m (170 lb⋅ft). The Aeolus Yixuan features a torsion beam type non-independent suspension.

Technical configurations including a Level-2 autonomous driving assistance system is also available on the Aeolus Yixuan, supporting functions such as automatic parking, forward collision warning, automatic brake assistance, adaptive cruising, lane keeping assistance, traffic signal recognition, and intelligent speed limit reminder. The Yixuan will also be equipped with a 7-inch LCD instrument panel and a 10-inch center console display.

=== Powertrain ===
| Model | Engine/Motor | Power | Torque | Fuel economy |
|---|---|---|---|---|
| 200T | 1.0L (999cc) DFMC10TDS I3 (turbo petrol) | 92 kW (123 hp) at 5500 rpm | 196 N⋅m (145 lb⋅ft) at 1500-4500 rpm | 5.6 L/100 km (42 mpg_{‑US}) |
| Mach Edition (NA) | 1.5L (1496cc) DFMC15DR I4 (NA petrol) | 92 kW (123 hp) at 5500 rpm | 196 N⋅m (145 lb⋅ft) at 1500-4500 rpm | 5.99 L/100 km (39 mpg_{‑US}) |
| 230T | 1.5L (1460cc) DFMA15T I4 (turbo petrol) | 110 kW (148 hp) at 5500 rpm | 230 N⋅m (170 lb⋅ft) at 1800-4000 rpm | 6.24 L/100 km (38 mpg_{‑US}) |
| Mach Edition (Turbo) | 1.5L (1476cc) DFMC15TP1 I4 (turbo petrol) | 145 kW (194 hp) at 6000 rpm | 300 N⋅m (221 lb⋅ft) at 2000-4000 rpm | 6.13 L/100 km (38 mpg_{‑US}) |
| EV | Permanent magnet synchronous motor | 120 kW (161 hp) | 260 N⋅m (192 lb⋅ft) | - |

=== Aeolus Yixuan Knight ===
The Aeolus Yixuan Knight is a sportier variant of the Yixuan sedan inspired by the Yixuan CTCC race car. The Yixuan Knight features a highly personalized sports package kit, a spoiler, and CTCC badges and is available in four vehicle trim levels, the 230T automatic dazzling shining knight, 230T automatic cool shining knight, 230T automatic dazzling knight and 230T automatic cool knight.

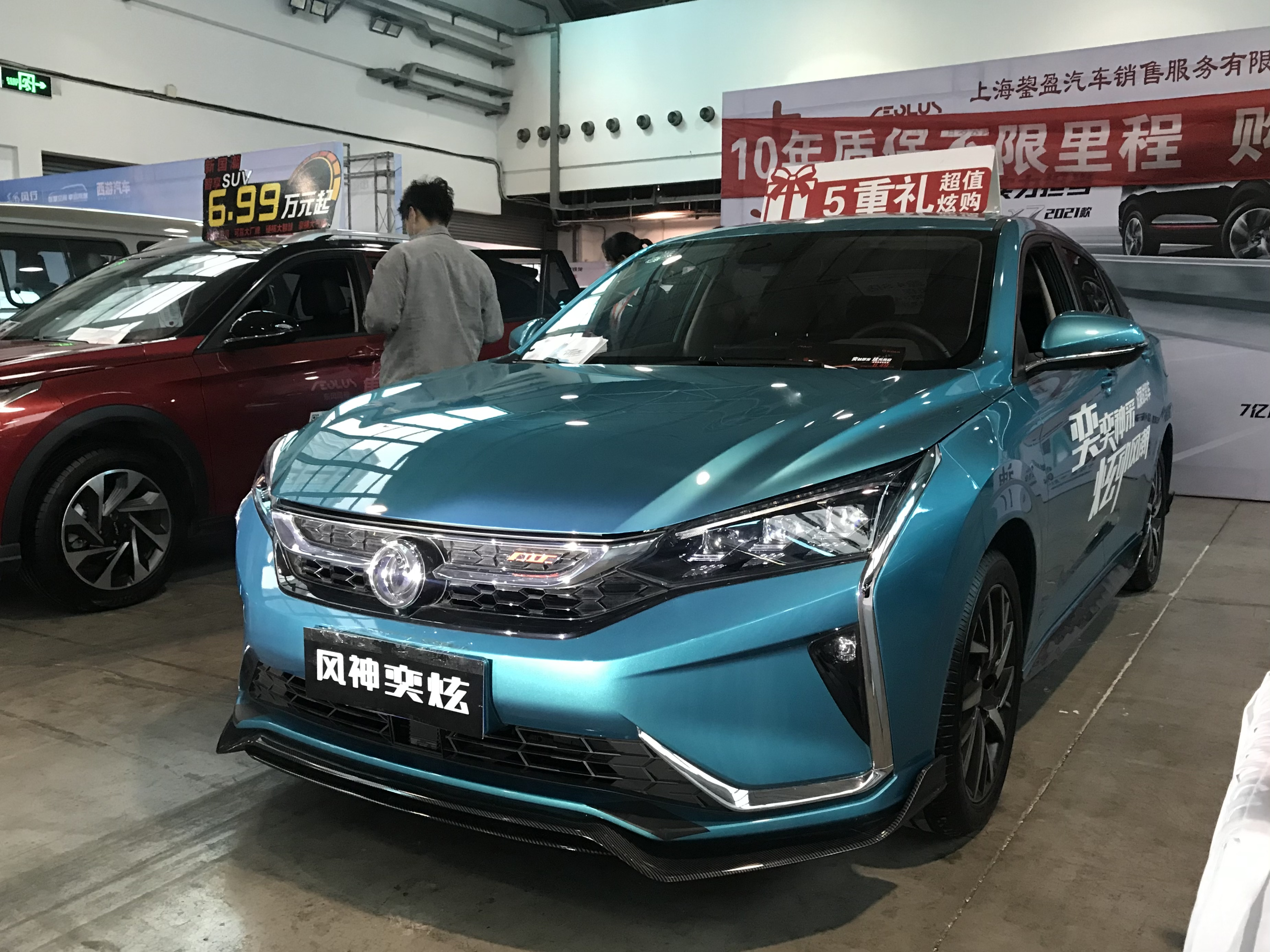
Aeolus Yixuan Knight front

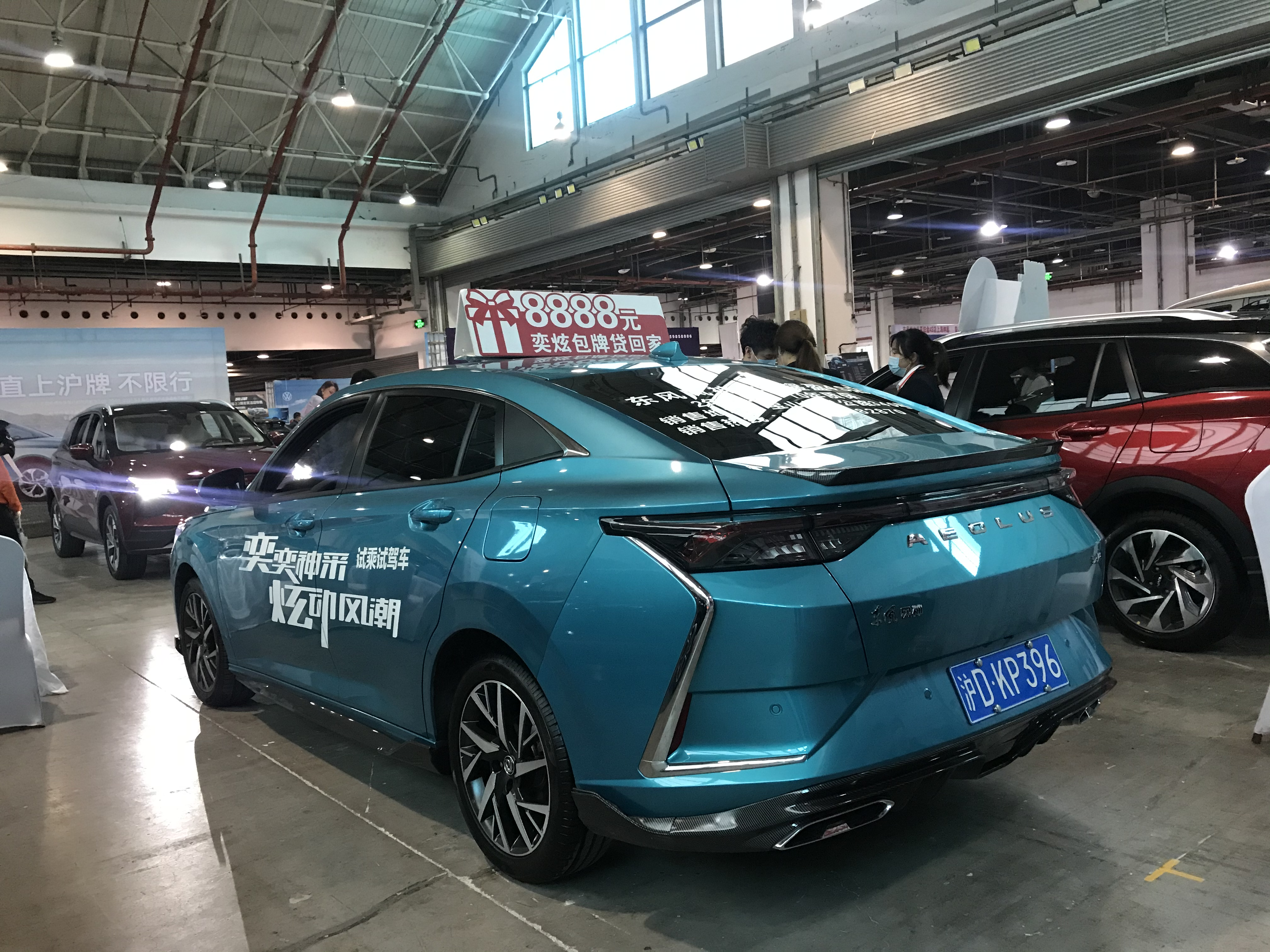
Aeolus Yixuan Knight rear

=== Aeolus Yixuan EV ===
The Yixuan EV, a pure electric compact sedan based on the Yixuan debuted in September 2019. The Yixuan EV is based on Aeolus's electric platform eCMP, and was listed in 2019. The battery capacity of the Yixuan EV is 47.7kWh and will bring the NEDC comprehensive cruising range of over 400 km (249 mi). The Yixuan EV is powered by a front-mounted permanent magnet synchronous motor with maximum power of 120 kW (160 hp; 160 PS) and is equipped with a lithium battery pack with a capacity of 47.7kWh.

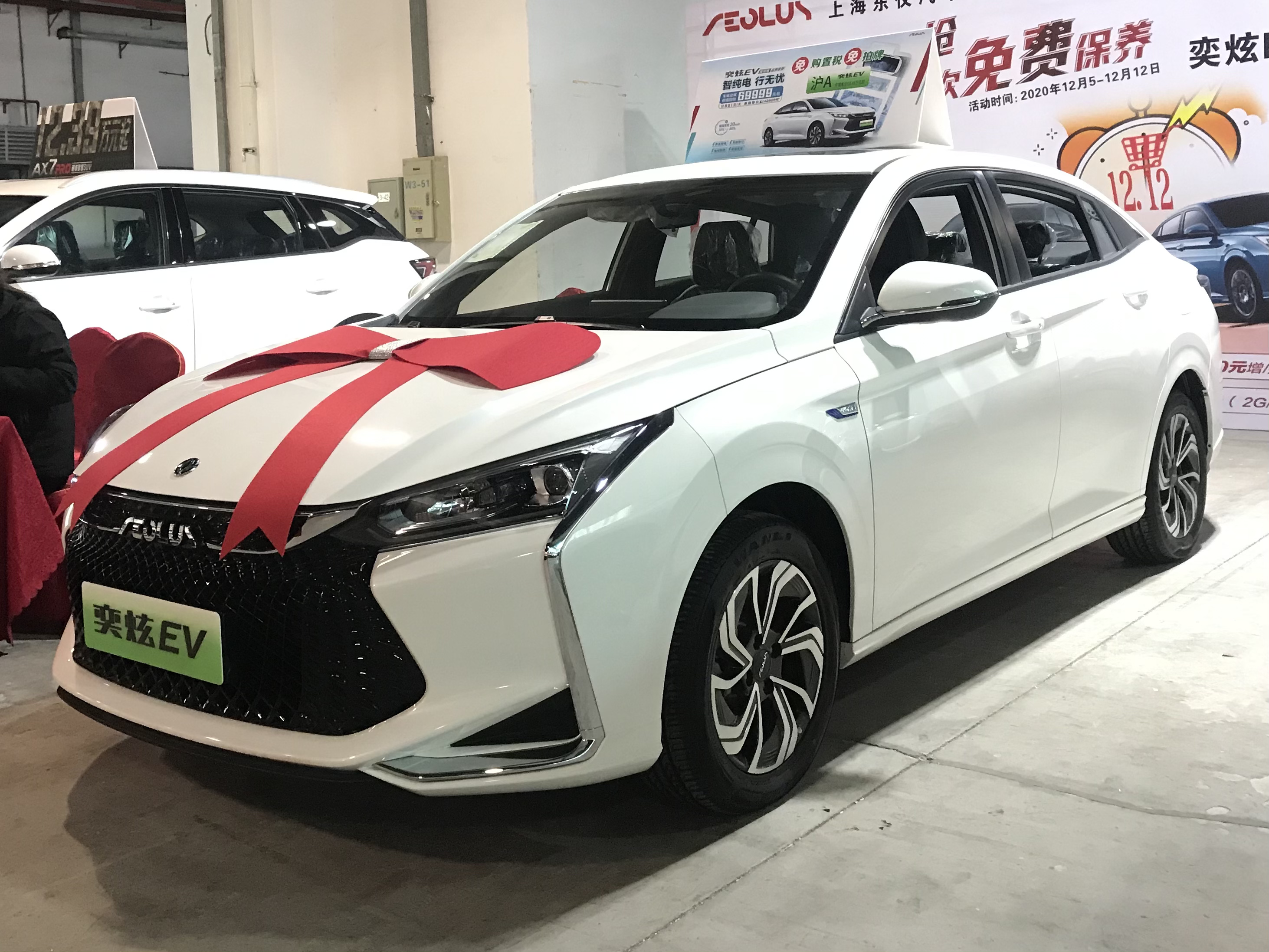
Aeolus Yixuan EV front

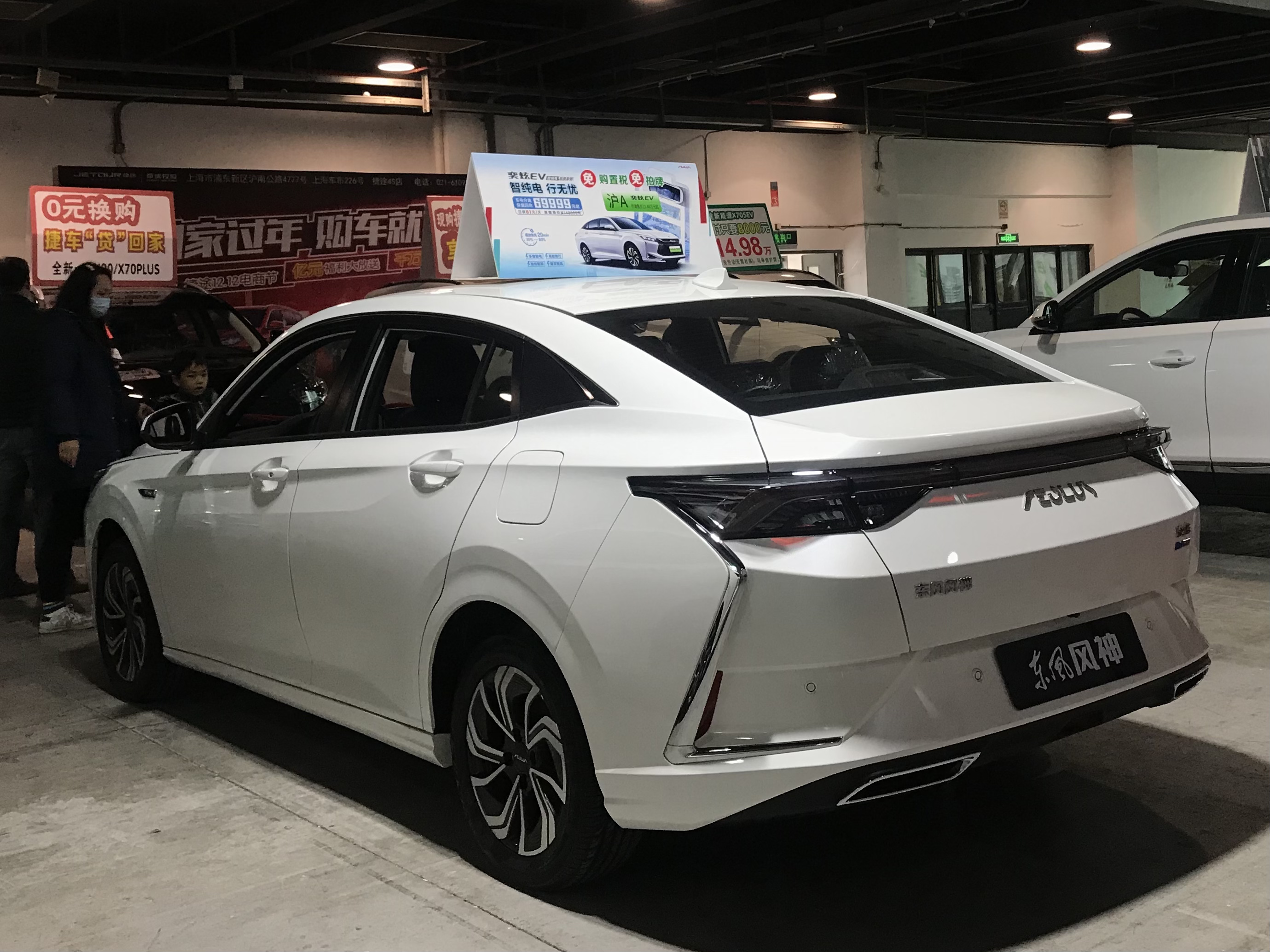
Aeolus Yixuan EV rear

=== Aeolus Yixuan CTCC racecar ===
The Aeolus Yixuan CTCC racecar is the racecar Aeolus used for the China Touring Car Championship (CTCC). Similar to the production Aeolus Yixuan, the Aeolus Yixuan CTCC racecar adopts the same CMP global modular platform, with the suspension adopting the international leading level adjustment technology.

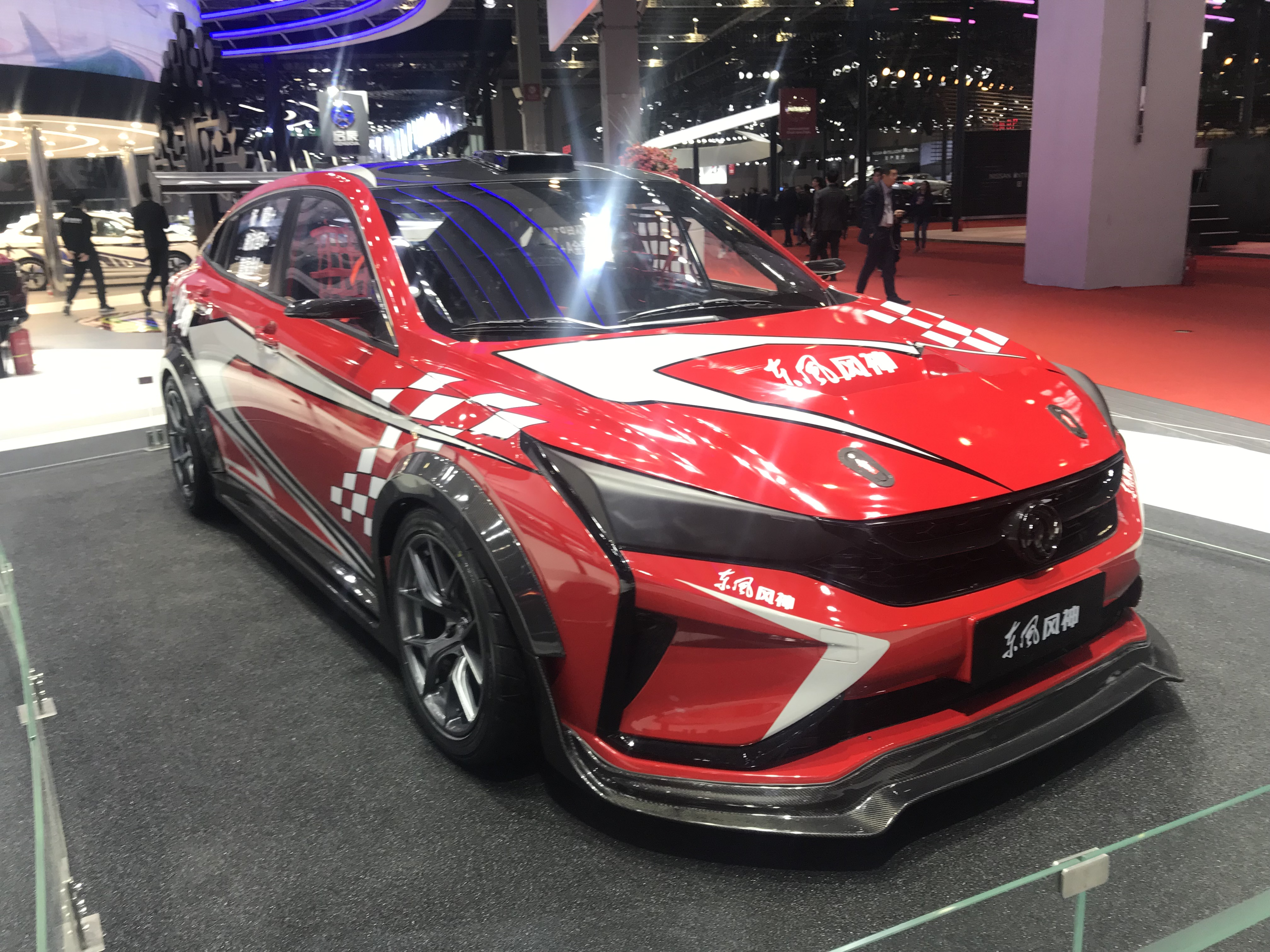
Aeolus Yixuan CTCC racecar front

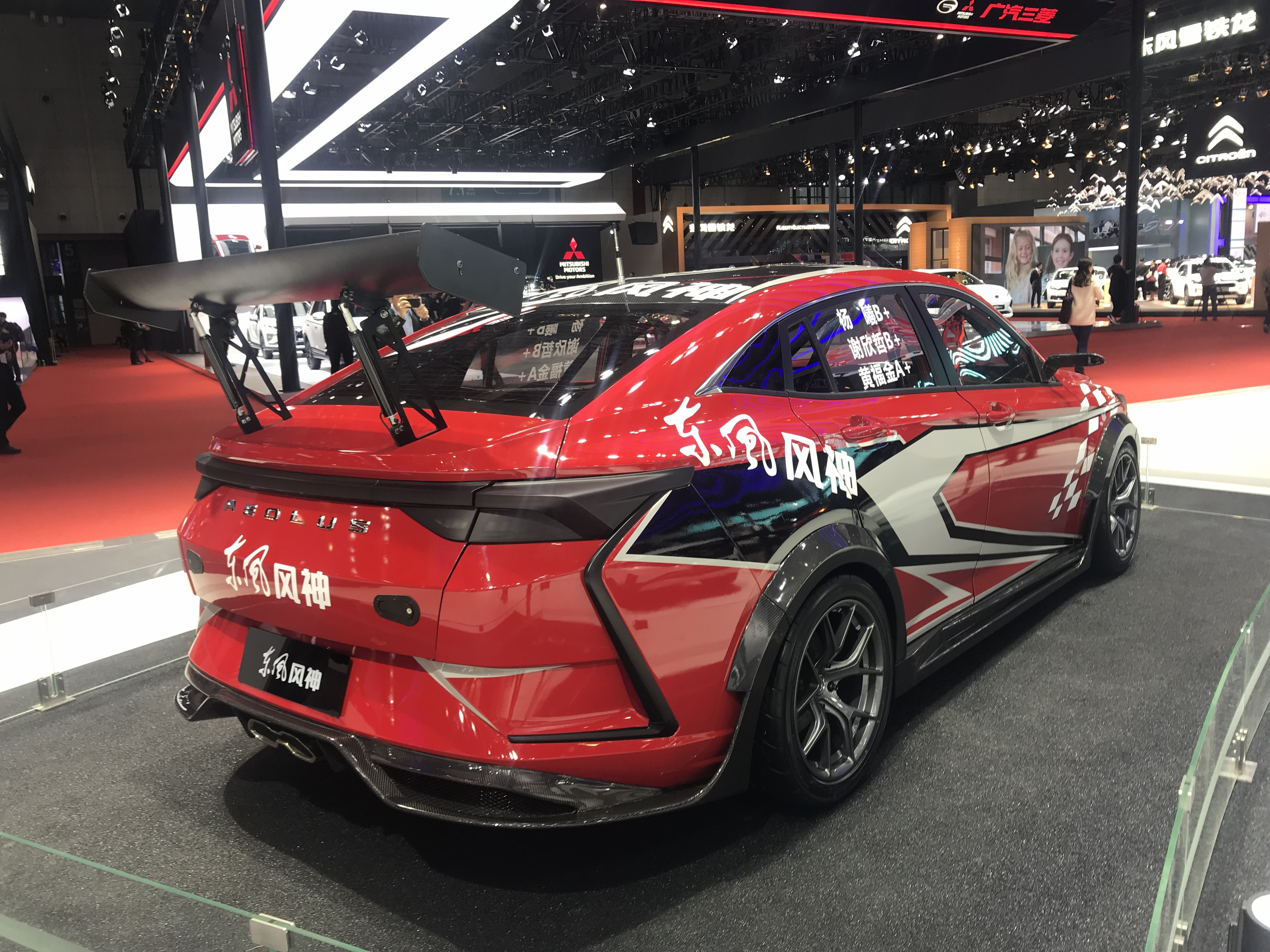
Aeolus Yixuan CTCC racecar rear

=== Aeolus Yixuan Mach Edition ===
The Yixuan Mach Edition is a special version sold alongside the regular Yixuan. It is sold at a lower price of 64,900 Yuan for the entry manual version and 69,900 Yuan for the entry 6DCT version, compared to 69,900 Yuan for the entry 1.0T manual Yixuan and 77,900 Yuan for the entry 1.5T 6DCT Yixuan.

All versions of the Mach edition are equipped with a weaker DFMC15DR naturally-aspirated 1.5L engine producing 92 kW (123 hp; 125 PS) of power at 6000 rpm and 158Nm of torque at 4500 rpm. The size of the car is 4670(4660)/1812/1490mm with a 2680mm wheelbase. Some models offer a two-color body with a black roof for consumers to choose from. From the side, the door handles and exterior mirrors are blackened.The size of the car is 4670(4660)/1812/1490mm with a 2680mm wheelbase. Some models offer a two-color body with a black roof for consumers to choose from. From the side, the door handles and exterior mirrors are blackened.

== Sales ==
| Year | China |
|---|---|
| 2022 | 73,053 |
| 2023 | 27,254 |
| 2024 | 16,659 |
| 2025 | 10,859 |
