= Aeolus A30 =

Compact sedan

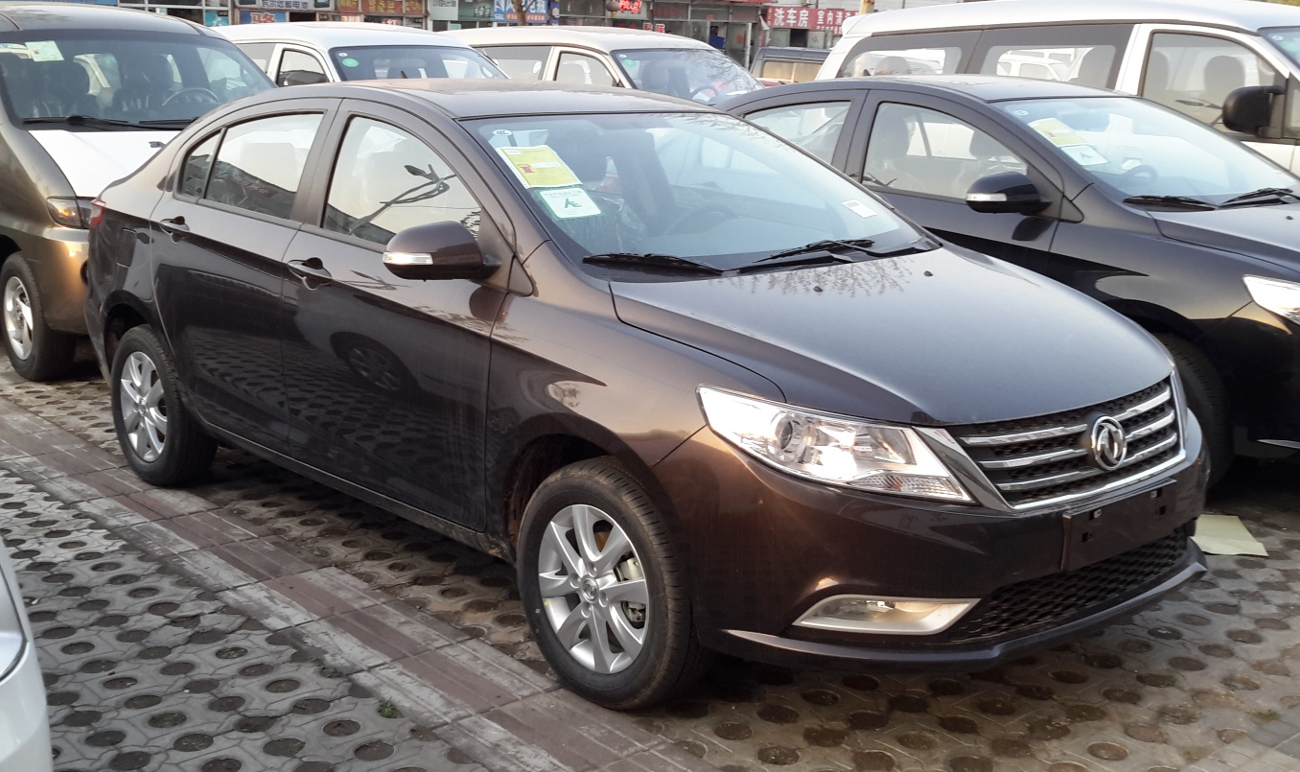

Overview
- Model code: D23
- Also called: Dongfeng Fengshen A30
- Production: 2014–2019

Body and chassis
- Layout: Front-engine, front-wheel-drive
- Related: Aeolus AX3

Powertrain
- Engine: 1.5 L I4 (petrol)
- Transmission: 5-speed manual 4-speed automatic

Dimensions
- Wheelbase: 2,620 mm (103.1 in)
- Length: 4,530 mm (178.3 in)
- Width: 1,730 mm (68.1 in)
- Height: 1,490 mm (58.7 in)

Chronology
- Predecessor: Aeolus S30
- Successor: Aeolus Yixuan

The Aeolus A30 (Dongfeng Fengshen A30) is a compact sedan produced by Dongfeng Motor Corporation under the Aeolus or Dongfeng Fengshen sub-brand.

== Overview ==
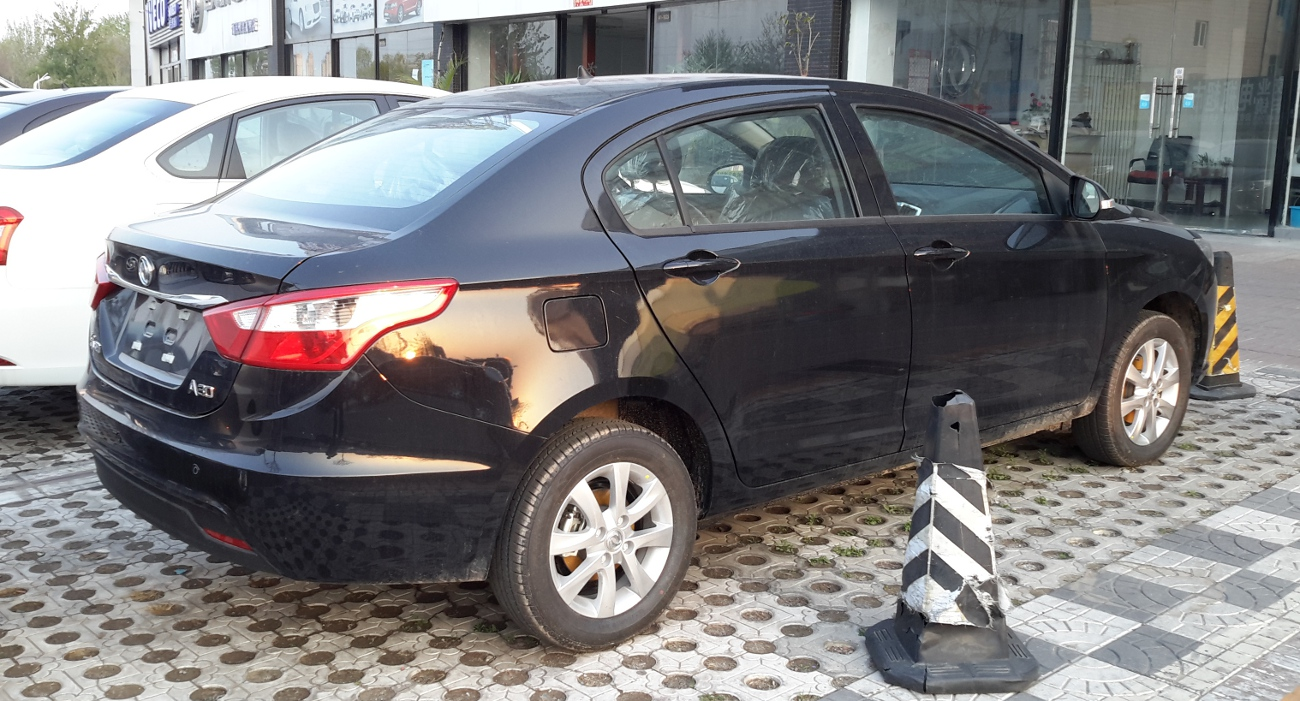
Dongfeng Fengshen A30 rear

Originally known by its codename Fengshen D23, the Aeolus A30 or Dongfeng Fengshen A30 was planned to be launched during the 2014 Chengdu Auto Show in September 2014. However, the Dongfeng Fengshen A30 sedan debuted in August 2014 instead as Fengshen's second sedan entry following the Fengshen S30 and positioned slightly upmarket with prices ranging from 59,700 yuan to 85,700 yuan.

=== Specifications ===
The Aeolus A30 is powered by a 1.5 liter four-cylinder petrol engine with 116 hp and 145 nm, mated to a 5-speed manual transmission or a 4-speed automatic transmission. The 2016 model year received improved performance while still utilizing the 1.5 liter engine with maximum engine power of 105.0 kW, maximum horsepower of 143PS and maximum torque of 189.0 N·m. The same platform also underpins the Dongfeng Fengshen AX3 subcompact crossover.
