= List of Monster chapters =

Written and illustrated by Naoki Urasawa, Monster was published in Big Comic Original from December 1994 to December 2001. The 162 chapters were periodically collected into 18 tankōbon volumes published by Shōgakukan, the first on 30 June 1995 and the last on 28 February 2002. While writing Monster, Urasawa began the series 20th Century Boys in 1999, which would continue after Monster had finished.

Monster was licensed in North America by Viz Media, who published all 18 volumes between 21 February 2006 and 16 December 2008. Starting in July 2014, they published a re-release of the series in nine two-in-one volumes, titled Monster: The Perfect Edition, with a new volume published every three months. The series has also received domestic releases in other countries, such as in Germany by Egmont Manga & Anime, in France and the Netherlands by Kana, in Spain by Planeta DeAgostini, in Brazil by Conrad Editora and later by Panini Comics, in Argentina by Larp Editores, in Taiwan by Tong Li Publishing, in Indonesia by M&C! and later reprinted under Akasha imprint, in Mexico by Grupo Editorial Vid, in Poland by Hanami, in Serbia by Darkwood, in Portugal by Devir, and in Ukraine by Nasha Idea.

== Volume list ==
No.	Title	Original release date	English release date
01	Herr Doctor Tenma	30 June 1995; 4-09-183651-8	21 February 2006; 1-59116-641-1
Chapter 001: "Herr Dr. Tenma" (ヘルDr.テンマ); Chapter 002: "Kill" (ころして, Koroshite); Chapter 003: "The Fall" (転落, Tenraku); Chapter 004: "Brother and Sister" (兄･妹); Chapter 005: "Murder" (殺人事件, Satsujinjiken); Chapter 006: "The BKA Man" (BKAの男, BKA no Otoko); Chapter 007: "Monster" (「モンスター」); Chapter 008: "Execution Night" (処刑の夜, Shokei no Yoru)
02	Surprise Party	30 September 1995; 4-09-183652-6	18 April 2006; 1-42-15-0112-0
Chapter 009: "Young Woman of Heidelberg" (ハイデルベルクの少女); Chapter 010: "Prince on a White Steed" (白馬の王子様); Chapter 011: "Missing Person Article" (失踪記事); Chapter 012: "Birthday of Terror" (戦慄の誕生日); Chapter 013: "House of Sorrow" (惨劇の館); Chapter 014: "Not Your Fault" (あなたは悪くない); Chapter 015: "Pursued" (追われる男); Chapter 016: "Old Soldier and Young Girl" (老兵と少女)
3	Kinderheim 511	27 April 1996; 4-09-183653-4	20 June 2006; 1-4215-0255-0
Chapter 017: "Past Erased" (消された過去); Chapter 018: "Lawyer's Law" (ローヤーの法則); Chapter 019: "511 Kinderheim" (511キンダーハイム); Chapter 020: "Project" (プロジェクト); Chapter 021: "A Little Experiment" (ささやかな実験); Chapter 022: "Petra and Schumann" (ペトラとシューマン); Chapter 023: "Petra and Heinz" (ペトラとハインツ); Chapter 024: "The Man Left Behind" (残された男)
4	Ayse's Friend	30 August 1996; 4-0918-3654-2	15 August 2006; 1-4215-0385-9
Chapter 025: "The Woman Left Behind" (残された女); Chapter 026: "Be My Baby" (ビー・マイ・ベイビー); Chapter 027: "Professor Gedrich" (ゲーデリッツ教授); Chapter 028: "Ayşe's Friend" (アイシェの友達); Chapter 029: "Wolf's Confession" (ヴォルフの告白); Chapter 030: "Main Dish" (メインディッシュ); Chapter 031: "Reunion" (再開); Chapter 032: "The Fifth Spoonful of Sugar" (五杯目の砂糖)
5	After the Carnival	2 April 1997; 4-0918-3655-0	17 October 2006; 1-4215-0498-7
Chapter 033: "The Monster's Abyss" (怪物の深淵); Chapter 034: "Jürgens's Cellar" (ユンゲルスの物置き); Chapter 035: "After the Carnival" (カ－ニバルのあと...); Chapter 036: "Journey to Freiham" (フラハイムへの旅); Chapter 037: "A Happy Holiday" (幸せな休日); Chapter 038: "Revenge at Gunpoint" (復讐の銃口); Chapter 039: "A Brighter Tomorrow" (明日は晴れる); Chapter 040: "Lunge's Prediction" (ルンゲの期待); Chapter 041: "Lunge's Trap" (ルンゲの罠)
6	The Secret Woods	30 May 1997; 4-0918-3656-9	19 December 2006; 1-4215-0499-5
Chapter 042: "Showdown" (対決); Chapter 043: "Rock Bottom" (転落の果て); Chapter 044: "Eva's Confession" (エヴァの告白); Chapter 045: "Men's Table" (男達の食卓); Chapter 046: "Unseen Enemy" (見えざる敵); Chapter 047: "Tuesday's Boy" (火曜日の青年); Chapter 048: "Thursday's Boy" (木曜日の青年); Chapter 049: "The Riddle Left Behind" (残された謎); Chapter 050: "The Secret Forest" (秘密の森)
7	Richard	30 October 1997; 4-0918-3657-7	20 February 2007; 1-4215-0500-2
Chapter 051: "Richard" (リヒァルト); Chapter 052: "Proof" (証拠の品); Chapter 053: "Brought to Light" (白日の下に); Chapter 054: "One Case" (ただ一つの事件); Chapter 055: "Journey to Johan" (ヨハンへの旅); Chapter 056: "Execution" (処刑); Chapter 057: "A Decision" (ある決意); Chapter 058: "Reichwein's Days" (ライヒワインの日々); Chapter 059: "Into the Light of Day" (白日の下へ)
8	My Nameless Hero	26 February 1998; 4-0918-3658-5	17 April 2007; 1-4215-0501-0
Chapter 060: "Verifiable" (立証可能); Chapter 061: "After the Party..." (パーティーのあと); Chapter 062: "Holy Land" (聖域); Chapter 063: "The Children's View" (子どもの情景); Chapter 064: "Humanity's Legacy" (人類の財産); Chapter 065: "The Deepest Darkness" (闇の果て); Chapter 066: "Shining a Light" (光を当てろ); Chapter 067: "I Am Tenma" (私はテンマ); Chapter 068: "Unnamed Hero" (名なしのヒーロー)
9	A Nameless Monster	30 May 1998; 4-0918-3659-3	19 June 2007; 1-4215-0968-7
Chapter 069: "A Greater Monster" (さらなる怪物); Chapter 070: "Beast of Chaos" (混沌の怪物); Chapter 071: "The Nameless Monster" (なまえのないかいぶつ); Chapter 072: "The Ants' Banquet" (蟻たちの饗宴); Chapter 073: "Demon in My Eyes" (我が目の悪魔); Chapter 074: "A Letter From Mother" (母からの手紙); Chapter 075: "Traces of the Heart" (心の痕跡); Chapter 076: "Hell in His Eyes" (目の中の地獄); Chapter 077: "The Frogs of Fairy Tale Land" (おとぎの国のカエル)
10	Picnic	30 October 1998; 4-0918-3660-7	21 August 2007; 1-4215-0969-5
Chapter 078: "Grimmer" (グリマー); Chapter 079: "Picnic" (ピクニック); Chapter 080: "The Ghost of 511" (511の亡霊); Chapter 081: "A New Experiment" (新たなる実験); Chapter 082: "Key" (鍵); Chapter 083: "The Adventures of the Magnificent Steiner" (超人シュタイナーの冒険); Chapter 084: "Detective Suk" (スーク刑事); Chapter 085: "A Top Secret Investigation" (極秘調査); Chapter 086: "Something Important" (大切な物)
11	The Dead Angle	30 March 1999; 4-0918-5271-8	16 October 2007; 1-4215-0970-9
Monster Chronicle; Chapter 087: "Double Darkness" (二つの闇); Chapter 088: "Remnants of a Monster" (怪物の残像); Chapter 089: "Replay" (録音再生); Chapter 090: "Point of Contact" (接点); Chapter 091: "Blind Spot" (死角); Chapter 092: "Memories of the Magnificent Steiner" (超人シュタイナーの思い出); Chapter 093: "Memories of Hot Cocoa" (ココアの記憶); Chapter 094: "Door to a Nightmare" (悪夢の扉); Chapter 095: "Greatest Fear" (一番怖いもの)
12	The Rose Mansion	30 June 1999; 4-0918-5272-6	18 December 2007; 1-4215-0971-7
Monster Chronicle; Chapter 096: "A Long Vacation" (長い休暇); Chapter 097: "Boy Detectives" (少年探偵団); Chapter 098: "The Cruelest Thing" (一番残酷なこと); Chapter 099: "Border Town" (国境の街); Chapter 100: "House of Roses" (バラの屋敷); Chapter 101: "The Sealed Door" (開かずの扉); Chapter 102: "A Long Goodbye" (長いお別れ); Chapter 103: "In Search of Helenka" (ヘレンカを捜して); Chapter 104: "The Ones Left Behind" (残された人々)
13	Escape	29 February 2000; 4-0918-5273-4	19 February 2008; 1-4215-1532-6
Monster Chronicle; Chapter 105: "Love Letter from a Monster" (怪物のラブレター); Chapter 106: "The Escapee" (脱獄囚); Chapter 107: "The Lawyer" (弁護士); Chapter 108: "The Witness" (目撃者); Chapter 109: "Decision" (決意); Chapter 110: "Muddy Sandwiches" (泥だらけのサンドイッチ); Chapter 111: "Helene and Gustav" (ヘレーネとグスタフ); Chapter 112: "Escape" (脱走); Chapter 113: "Room 402" (402号室)
14	That Night	30 June 2000; 4-0918-5274-2	15 April 2008; 1-4215-1836-8
Monster Chronicle; Chapter 114: "The Spy's Child" (スパイの子); Chapter 115: "Endless Journey" (終わらない旅); Chapter 116: "Puppeteer" (人形使い); Chapter 117: "The Reading Group Children" (朗読会の子供たち); Chapter 118: "That Night" (あの日の夜); Chapter 119: "What Johan Saw" (ヨハンの見た風景); Chapter 120: "Happy Memories" (楽しい思い出); Chapter 121: "The Bad Job" (いやな仕事); Chapter 122: "The Worst Necktie" (最悪なネクタイ)
15	The Door to Memories	30 October 2000; 4-0918-5275-0	17 June 2008; 1-4215-1837-6
Monster Chronicle; Chapter 123: "Party's Over" (パーティー イズ オーバー); Chapter 124: "The Man Who Saw a Devil" (悪魔を見た男); Chapter 125: "The Devil's Friend" (悪魔の友だち); Chapter 126: "The Man Who Knew Too Much" (知りすぎた男); Chapter 127: "Sad Reunion" (悲しみの再会); Chapter 128: "Nina's Memory" (ニナの記憶); Chapter 129: "Reading Group Memories" (朗読会の思い出); Chapter 130: "Doorway to a Memory" (記憶の扉); Chapter 131: "A Happy Table" (楽しい食卓)
16	Welcome Home	28 February 2001; 4-0918-5276-9	19 August 2008; 1-4215-1838-4
Monster Chronicle; Chapter 132: "Beyond the Rooftops" (屋根の向こうまで); Chapter 133: "Response to Friendship" (友情の答え); Chapter 134: "Taxi Driver" (タクシードライバー); Chapter 135: "Unrelated Murders" (無関係な殺人); Chapter 136: "The Baby's Gloom" (赤ん坊の憂うつ); Chapter 137: "Footsteps of Terror" (恐怖の足音); Chapter 138: "Traces of Johan'" (ヨハンの足跡); Chapter 139: "Massacre" (殺し合い); Chapter 140: "Father and Mother" (父さん母さん); Chapter 141: "Welcome Home" (おかえり)
17	I'm Home	30 August 2001; 4-0918-5277-7	21 October 2008; 1-4215-1839-2
Monster Chronicle; Chapter 142: "I'm Back" (ただいま); Chapter 143: "The Place to Go" (行くべきところ); Chapter 144: "Ruhenheim" (ルーエンハイム); Chapter 145: "A Quiet Gunshot" (静かなる銃声); Chapter 146: "The Vampire's House" (吸血鬼の家); Chapter 147: "Paranoia Town" (疑心暗鬼の町); Chapter 148: "Perfect Suicide" (完全な自殺); Chapter 149: "A Peaceful Home" (安らぎの家); Chapter 150: "Massacre Town" (殺戮の町); Chapter 151: "A Memory to Keep" (忘れたくない記憶)
18	Scenery of the Doomsday	28 February 2002; 4-0918-5278-5	16 December 2008; 1-4215-1840-6
Monster Chronicle; Chapter 152: "A Fictional Character" (架空の人間); Chapter 153: "Vacation's End" (休暇の終わり); Chapter 154: "Grimmer's Scream" (グリマーの叫び); Chapter 155: "The Magnificent Steiner's Rage" (超人シュタイナーの怒り); Chapter 156: "The Nameless Man" (名前のない男); Chapter 157: "Undrawable Pictures" (描けない絵); Chapter 158: "Don't Cry" (泣かないで); Chapter 159: "A Vision of the End" (終わりの風景); Chapter 160: "The Living" (命ある者たち); Chapter 161: "Tomorrow Will Come" (明日はくる); Chapter 162: "The Real Monster" (本当の怪物)

Another Monster

No.	Title	Japanese release date	Japanese ISBN
1	Another Monster	—	—
Preface; Introduction; Part One (1986–1997); Chapter 1 – The Beginning (April 2001; Vienna); Chapter 2 – Kenzo Tenma (May 2001; Yokohama, Tokyo, London); Chapter 3 – Eva Heinemann (May 2001; Düsseldorf); Chapter 4 – Heinrich Lunge (May 2001; Brussels); Chapter 5 – Kinderheim 511 (May 2001; Berlin); Chapter 6 – Multiple Personalities (June 2001; Frankfurt); Chapter 7 – Rudi Gillen (June 2001; Paris); Chapter 8 – Underground Banks (June 2001; Füssen); Chapter 9 – Karl Schuwald (June 2001; Munich); Chapter 10 – Lotte Frank (June 2001; Munich); Chapter 11 – Julius Reichwein (June 2001; Munich)
2	Another Monster: Part two	—	—
Chapter 12 – Czech and Germany (July 2001; Prague); Chapter 13 – Jan Suk (July 2001; Prague); Chapter 14 – Karel Ranke (July 2001; Prague); Chapter 15 – The Red Rose Mansion (July 2001; Prague); Chapter 16 – Anna (August 2001; Prague); Chapter 17 – Sobotka (August 2001; Prague); Chapter 18 – Jaromir Lipsky (August 2001; Prague); Chapter 19 – Fritz Verdeman (August 2001; Düsseldorf); Chapter 20 – Martin (September 2001; Frankfurt); Chapter 21 – Peter Capek (September 2001; Frankfurt); Chapter 22 – Grimmer's Notebook (October 2001; Berlin); Chapter 23 – Herman Fuer (November 2001; Vienna); Chapter 24 – Collapse (November 2001; Düsseldorf); Chapter 25 – Ruhenheim (November 2001; Ruhenheim); Chapter 26 – Nina Forter, a.k.a. Anna Liebert (November 2001; Vienna); Chapter 27 – "The Magnificent Steiner" (November 2001; Valletta); Chapter 28 – Anna Part II (December 2001; Brno); Chapter 29 – Klaus Poppe (December 2001; Jablonec nad Nisou); Chapter 30 – Franz Bonaparta (December 2001; Jablonec nad Nisou); Final Chapter – (December 2001; Jablonec nad Nisou)
