= Aeolus AX3 =

Aeolus (Dongfeng Fengshen) AX3
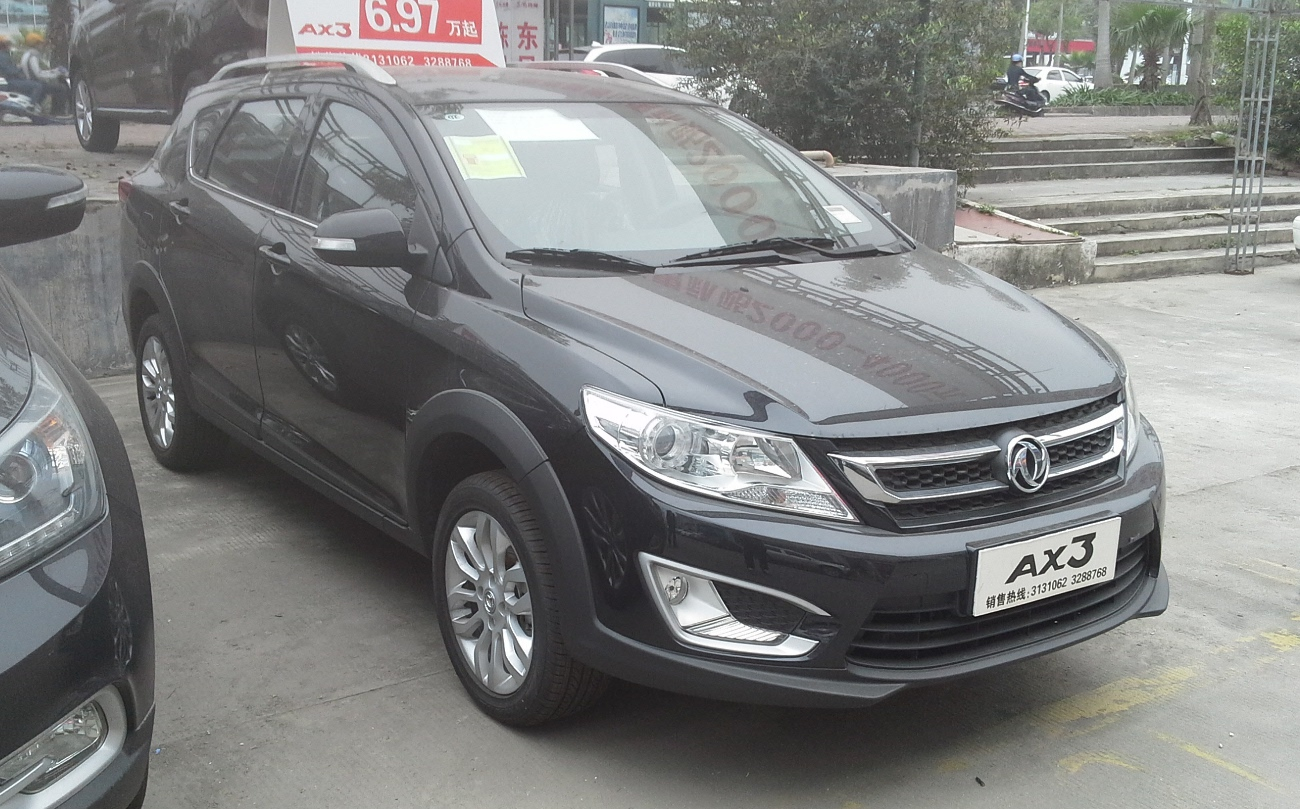

Overview
- Manufacturer: Aeolus
- Production: 2015–2019
- Model years: 2016–2019

Body and chassis
- Layout: Front-engine, front-wheel-drive
- Related: Dongfeng Fengshen A30

Powertrain
- Engine: 1.5 L I4 (petrol); 1.4 L turbo I4 (petrol)
- Transmission: 5-speed manual 6-speed automatic

Dimensions
- Wheelbase: 2,620 mm (103.1 in)
- Length: 4,518 mm (177.9 in)
- Width: 1,740 mm (68.5 in)
- Height: 1,562 mm (61.5 in)

The Aeolus AX3 is a subcompact crossover SUV produced by Dongfeng Motor Corporation under the Aeolus (Dongfeng Fengshen) sub-brand.

== Overview ==
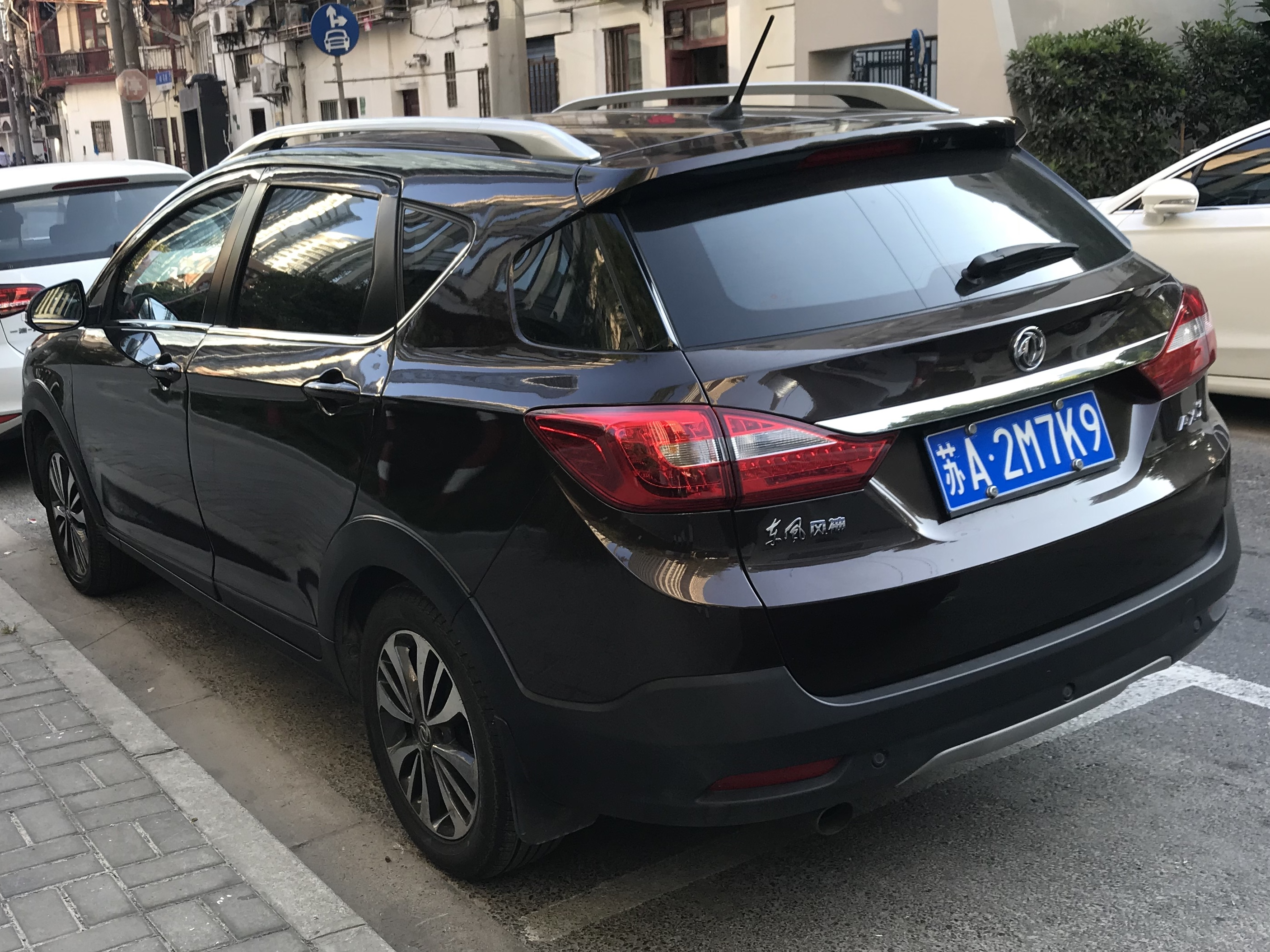
Fengshen AX3 rear

The Aeolus AX3 was unveiled on the 2015 Shanghai Auto Show with the market launch in January 2016 revealing prices ranging from 69,700 yuan to 87,700 yuan.

=== Specifications ===
The Aeolus AX3 is powered by a 1.5 liter engine producing 116 hp and 145 nm mated to a five-speed manual gearbox or a four-speed automatic gearbox, and a 1.4 liter turbo engine producing 140 hp and 196 nm available with the five-speed manual gearbox. The same platform also underpins the Dongfeng Fengshen A30 subcompact sedan.
