= List of Golgo 13 episodes =

DVD of the Golgo 13 TV series, released only in Japan.

The episodes of Golgo 13 are based on the manga of the same name but were re-imagined to fit current real-world synchronism. The first episode aired in Japanese on April 11, 2008 with Japanese television actor Hiroshi Tachi playing the role of Duke Togo. The series is animated by The Answer Studio and directed by Shunji Oga, who also did some storyboard work based on the Golgo 13 franchise.

The episodes are based on Duke Togo aka Golgo 13, an internationally known mercenary assassin, who is known by law enforcement agencies, criminals, terrorists and other factions around the world. He is notorious around the world as he is hired by many persons ranging from individuals, who can afford to hire him for an assignment, to foreign governments and secret organizations. The show details the various tasks that he undertakes and his encounters with various people.

The opening theme, Take The Wave, was performed by Naifu with the second opening theme So faraway performed by Pinc Inc played beginning from episode 26 with the exception of episode 19 and 21 since it used Take The Wave as its opening theme. For episodes 1 to 12, the ending theme song Garasu no Haiwei or Glass Highway was performed by doa, released in their album Prime Garden on November 19, 2008. The second ending theme song Yume no Hitotsu was performed by GARNET CROW with their single released on August 13, 2008. The third ending song Sono Hohoemi Yo Eien ni is performed by Aiko Kitahara from episodes 26 to 38. It was released a single on November 5, 2008. The fourth and final ending theme, "Mou Kimi wo Hitori ni Sasenai", was performed by U-KA Saegusa in DB with the single released on February 25, 2009.

Golgo 13 has already been released for the DVD. Volume 1 of the series has been released to the public on June 26, 2009. Volume 2 was released on July 24, 2009. Volume 3 has already been released on August 25, 2009. Volume 4 was released on September 25, 2009.

Aside from DVD releases, the show is also released on the UMD with a few select episodes taken from the series released publicly as Golgo 13: Best Selection. The first volume, released on June 26, 2009, includes episodes 15, 32, 39 and 49. The second volume was released on July 24, 2009, with episodes 14, 26, 33 and 34. The third volume was released on August 25, 2009.

The series has been licensed in North America by Sentai Filmworks, and distributed by Section23 Films. The first DVD set was released on July 13, 2010, with an English dub. The second set was released on September 14, 2010. The English dub is currently streaming on the Anime Network.

== Episode list ==
No.	Title	Original release date
1	"At Pin-Hole!"	April 11, 2008
Duke Togo, aka Golgo 13, gets out of jail with assistance from the FBI and the CIA in Texas. Jake Quade, a gangster turned CIA informant, hijacked a domestic flight after killing a sky marshal and stealing his side arm with the threat of blowing it up and killing the passengers held as his hostages with smuggled C-4 explosives. Golgo 13 snipes him in the aircraft's cockpit from a long distance in a nearby airfield after getting a highly modified .308 Winchester bolt-action sniper rifle from an underground firearms maker.
2	"Room No. 909"	April 18, 2008
Golgo 13 is hired by a representative of the U.S. Securities and Exchange Commission for an assignment when he was told to target a mafia financier in New York. Despite getting into trouble when his used .30-06 Springfield cartridge fell down from his apartment balcony due to the appearance of a stray cat, Togo covers his tracks when a detective of the NYPD starts to hound him over his stay in New York City.
3	"The Masterpiece Assault Rifle"; Transliteration: "Kessaku Asaruto Raifuru" (Japanese: 傑作･アサルトライフル)	April 25, 2008
What began as a simple mission to stir up trouble for racers driving Japanese-made vehicles in a rally race turns into a match of sniping when Golgo 13 is targeted by the Savine brothers, ex-French Foreign Legion soldiers turned mercenaries armed with modified XM29 OICW and FN F2000 bullpup assault rifles while being aided by customized digital scopes made by a European arms dealer named Kaizer in order to market them to numerous military forces from around the globe.
4	"Pretty Woman"; Transliteration: "Puriti Ūman" (Japanese: プリティ･ウーマン)	May 2, 2008
Linda, the wife of a mafia leader in New York City, hires Golgo 13 for the purpose of assassinating her husband so as to start another life all over again in Florida after being disgruntled over her current life. Things gets complicated when the mafia boss kills one of his henchmen after being accused of trying to be in an affair with Linda, resulting in a small gang war fight before Golgo 13 was able to get rid of his targets and unfortunately Linda when she decides to kill him after ignoring her personal requests.
5	"The Superstar's Joint Appearance"; Transliteration: "Sūpāsutā no Kyōen" (Japanese: スーパースターの共演)	May 9, 2008
Bob Stinger, vice-president of Conan Associates, hires an ex-Polish Olympic athlete and soldier named Ledell Nikolavitch to assassinate the company's president and current leader Ted Conan in order to take over the entire company despite what Ted had done to help Bob escape from his past problems after he ran into some money trouble. However, Ted is wise to Bob's game and decides to hire Golgo 13 secretly to assassinate both Bob and Ledell for good.
6	"An Offering to God"; Transliteration: "Kami ni Okurareshi Mono" (Japanese: 神に贈られし物)	May 15, 2008
Golgo 13 is hired out by a mobster to go to Massachusetts and assassinate an anti-crime analyst during the state's presidential elections. When Golgo 13 is arrested by FBI agents for assaulting an agent after his work was done, he is grilled regarding the murder and the PPS-made revolver that he used until a lawyer named Mr. Barton begins to question the loopholes in the FBI's accusations against Duke.
7	"Sharp Shoot on the G String"; Transliteration: "G Senjō no Sogeki" (Japanese: G線上の狙撃)	May 23, 2008
Golgo 13 is secretly hired by Thomas Simpson, a famed violinist from the London Symphony Orchestra to sabotage a charity concert led by his replacement Sergei Kerensky by shooting the G-string from his violin after his own concert was botched up when a G-string from his own violin had been broken off before the public. Golgo completes his job, despite Sergei's remedy to his problem of a lost G-String by improvising another string instead.
8	"Action in 4/24"; Transliteration: "Dōsa Ni Jū Yon Bun no Yon" (Japanese: 動作·24分の4)	May 30, 2008
Golgo 13 is hired by a mafia boss to kill another heavy-handed mafia boss. The targeted boss learns of Golgo's attempt to have him assassinated and installs bulletproof glass and sends emissaries to analyze Golgo's handgun response time in order to figure out countermeasures against the mercenary assassin. Golgo 13 must now find a way to defeat the bulletproof glass and overcome research of his own abilities while avoiding three assassins sent to kill him.
9	"Sleep Inside the Cage"; Transliteration: "Ori no Naka no Nemuri" (Japanese: 檻の中の眠り)	June 6, 2008
Golgo 13 is arrested and sent to Pandora Island Prison, an isolated prison somewhere near the Alaska mainland to rescue a prisoner named Patrick Zalas despite being under the thumb of a sadistic and corrupt warden named Kickers. During Golgo's stay in the prison, he begins to secretly work out a plan to have him and Patrick out of the island for good. But after the two escape from the island prison, Golgo executes him under orders of Patrick's bosses.
10	"The Target Has Returned"; Transliteration: "Kaette Kita Tāgetto" (Japanese: 帰ってきた標的)	June 13, 2008
Golgo 13 assassinates a drug lord in a guerrilla-style ambush after he attacks and wipes out his FBI and NYPD escorts before heading to Hong Kong to do another job when he finds out that his employer wanted him to kill a lookalike of his boss instead. Golgo then proceeds to kill the lookalike after he proceeds to gun down his henchmen.
11	"Dead Angle"; Transliteration: "Deddo Anguru" (Japanese: デッド·アングル)	June 20, 2008
Golgo 13 is hired to assassinate the Jordanian emissary to the United States, while the emissary transfers from a plane to his helicopter. However, a young, hot-shot mercenary sniper named Katz Double is hired by the American State Department to take Golgo out before he accomplishes this. By leaving two disassembled rifles in fake sniping points, Duke is able to fool the inexperienced gunman. Golgo then uses an M-16 to take out both his new rival and the helicopter.
12	"Touch Down"	June 27, 2008
In Baltimore, Maryland, a rising American football star named Lionel Blue was assassinated by Golgo 13 by using his M-16 in a hidden rangefinger after being hired by a disgruntled football player via football gambler. An old-fashioned detective and the Baltimore police try to pin the evidence on him, the difference by the use of technology before Golgo 13 destroys the CSI Department's computer equipment with assistance from Dave McCartney despite being in a hospital under pretense of a potential cholera infection.
13	"Cross Angle"; Transliteration: "Kurosu Anguru" (Japanese: クロスアングル)	July 4, 2008
Victor Lance, a paparazzo photographer, decides to take a photo of Golgo 13 before he retires for good in order to prove to his boss that he's still one of the best paparazzo in the media business after exposing public figures to the public by secretly photographing them. Unfortunately, Golgo 13 takes out Lance's camera for good with the help of reflected sunlight on his camera before Golgo takes out his main target in Britain. As Victor leaves the building he tried to photograph Golgo at, both men spot one another from across the street. Victor states Golgo is a monster as the screen then fades to black and a gunshot is heard.
14	"Deadly Shadow of the Setting Sun"; Transliteration: "Rakujitsu no Shiei" (Japanese: 落日の死影)	July 11, 2008
The American government hires Golgo 13 to eliminate a Syndicate-established hideout where poisons from various animals are weaponized by the CIA for various black ops operations. However, another assassin named AX-3 is also hired out by the American government to do the same thing Golgo was supposed to do. AX-3 is eventually killed in a shootout between the two assassins when his handler informs him of his orders to eliminate Golgo 13.
15	"Eva, Heading for the Sea"; Transliteration: "Umi e Mukau Eba" (Japanese: 海へ向かうエバ)	July 18, 2008
Golgo 13 is hired by the New York Mafia to assassinate an international assassin. She turns out to be Eva Kruger, a woman Golgo had met on a cruise ship when an unknown terrorist had planted a bomb on it. The two parted ways after he defused it to save the passengers despite being told by the ship's crew to evacuate with the rest of the passengers. But even though Eva decides to retire as an assassin and be a civilian, Golgo had successfully assassinated her from a distance on another boat.
16	"The Saint with the Stench of Death"; Transliteration: "Shishū no Seija" (Japanese: 死臭の聖者)	July 25, 2008
Fueled by the murder of his fiancé by the new underground cult the NYPD had been investigating, a NYPD Officer hires Golgo 13 to assassinate the cult's masked leader, Michael. However, the cult's members, fearless of death, go to any lengths to protect its leader, a self-proclaimed saint. As Golgo 13 infiltrated the cult, he is quickly recognized as a threat and ordered to be killed. Though, he thwarted their plans and escaped while being pursued by the cult's extremist followers.
17	"Afterglow"; Transliteration: "Zankō" (Japanese: 残光)	August 1, 2008
On a routine assassination job in Hawaii, Golgo 13 spots an old FBI detective named Leon Goldman, who had tried to charge him with a previous assassination in San Francisco. At the scene of the current assassination, Goldman automatically knew that Golgo 13 was the sniper, but kept quiet because he did not wish to deal with such a trivial case any longer and tries to convince Golgo 13 to leave. At the end of episode Golgo 13 kills Leon himself.
18	"Alphonse Louis Steinbeck III"; Transliteration: "Sutainbekku San Sei" (Japanese: スタインベック三世)	August 8, 2008
Golgo 13 is hired by a MI5 operative, who had been able to infiltrate covertly the security detail of Louis Steinbeck III, an aristocratic man supposedly of French royal descent under orders from the British government. Golgo is hired to assassinate Steinbeck III as he is the leader of a secret rogue intelligence organization that sells out all types of classified information to various countries called MC-130. However, the MI5 operative/Steinbeck III bodyguard learns that Golgo did not target Steinbeck III but instead, went for the butler as he was the real leader of MC-130 when the hit was in operation.
19	"The Glass Fortress"; Transliteration: "Garasu no Yōsai" (Japanese: 硝子の要塞)	August 15, 2008
Golgo is deployed on a covert mission in England to locate and kill a reclusive millionaire named Vargas Walton who has been "keeping" women as his guests in his estate located at an artificial island, ready to have healthy organs from them to be harvested and kept ready for donors while using the funds from organ donations to finance several terrorist groups. The millionaire is protected by high-tech bulletproof glass, making an assassination attempt from the sea or air nearly impossible coupled with an ex-expert Olympic shooter named J.J. as the head of his bodyguard detail.
20	"Melancholy Summer"; Transliteration: "Merankorī Samā" (Japanese: メランコリー·夏)	August 22, 2008
Golgo is sent to Malta on a secret mission on an assignment from the British government after a Foreign and Commonwealth Office employee named Arnold Glaston went rogue and was said to have sold national secrets to Russian companies, forcing him to escape overseas by marrying a girl named Stella in Malta. The mercenary follows Stella everyday to determine Arnold's location despite being told that he had escaped to America. Even with persistence from MI:6, Golgo was able to determine that Arnold had planned to return to Malta, which enabled the assassin to complete his mission with success.
21	"Garimpeiro"; Transliteration: "Garinpeiro" (Japanese: ガリンペイロ)	August 29, 2008
Golgo is hired by a man from the rural part of Brazil, seeking revenge on a man named Falcon a leader of the Garimpeiro and his minions for the death of his family and the Brazilian Military Police for letting it slide. He performs this task by hijacking a plane and asking three million in ransom to lure the Garimpiero and the police into chasing him by jumping down to the amazon.
22	"Indian Summer"; Transliteration: "Indian Samā" (Japanese: インディアン·サマー)	September 5, 2008
A small family-run motel hears news of a casino robbery when Golgo turns up to stay. Hank, the son of the family returns home with another man having executed the robbery. The blind mother is suspicious of Hank and is unnerved by Golgo, but the assassin leaves before anything happens. Confronting Hank, the mother accidentally shoots Hank and the accomplice escapes to deliver the money to his boss, without realizing that Golgo has been hired by the mob to kill those responsible for robbing their casino.
23	"Jetstream"; Transliteration: "Jetto Sutorīmu" (Japanese: ジェット·ストリーム)	September 12, 2008
The plane that Golgo travels on has been hijacked by terrorists demanding money after it lands in Britain's Heathrow Airport with the sky marshal taken out, who intend to escape with it before blowing it up. Looking at the passenger list, the head of SIS decided to hire Golgo and gave him an encrypted message to him to take out the hijackers. Golgo talks to the head of Scotland Yard after the incident was over.
24	"Santa Ana"; Transliteration: "Santa Ana" (Japanese: サンタ·アナ)	September 19, 2008
Brigitta, a female assassin is hired to kill Golgo 13, but she knows she is no match for him. As a means to even out the contest she meets with him and gives him the job of taking out a mafia boss who is using a meat factory as a front. While Duke is preparing for the job she informs the boss of Golgo 13 who promptly sends over his band of goons to kill him. However he escapes and leads the goons straight to the meat factory and lures them out of their cars where the sirocco wind is blowing the sand from the desert restricting their visibility, where he picks them off. Brigitta planned this as a way to put Duke at a disadvantage so that his eyesight would be impaired when it came to the duel. Donning a pair of goggles she sets out to finish off Golgo but she underestimates just how well-prepared he is.
25	"Florida Chase"; Transliteration: "Furorida·Cheisu" (Japanese: フロリダ·チェイス)	September 26, 2008
The aide to the US Foreign Secretary hires Golgo to kill Jose Campos, an immigrant drug distributor who is in custody, but is still organizing the smuggling of drugs into Florida. Meanwhile a new type of armored van is stolen and used in springing Campos from a prison bus. In order for the US to save face and with the authorities unable to stop the armored van, the aide requires that Golgo completes the job before Campos makes it to Mexico. Duke acquires the schematics to the van and a specialized gun with armor-piercing bullets and masquerades as a SWAT team member at a roadblock and successfully shoots Campos through the van's weak point.
26	"Cold-hearted Catherine"; Transliteration: "Reiketsu Kyasarin" (Japanese: 冷血キャサリン)	October 3, 2008
MI5 hire Golgo to assassinate Pamela, a woman from a radical PIRA faction against the end of the armed campaign. Catherine, a friend of Pamela's and was once an infamous cold-hearted terrorist who once hired Golgo 13, now follows the pacifist ideals following the death of her son. When Pamela kills a friend of Catherine's she also hires Golgo 13 to assassinate Pamela to prevent more widespread bloodshed but she has no means to pay for his service. He still accepts but, due to Pamela's paranoia, will have to snipe her blind as she will be behind a blackout curtain. Catherine will lure Pamela to a specified spot and give Golgo a signal to shoot. During the meeting an argument breaks out and Pamela shoots Catherine. Acting blindly Golgo calculates Pamela's position from the bullet hole in the window and successfully snipes her.
27	"Fearless"; Transliteration: "Fiaresu" (Japanese: フィアレス)	October 11, 2008
An ex-KGB agent who has a grudge against Golgo tries to kill him with his army of soldiers – people who have survived near-death accidents and have been drugged and trained to be fearless. Golgo defeats the fearless army and then goes after the former agent.
28	"Love Moans on an Arctic Night"; Transliteration: "Byakuya wa Ai no Umeki" (Japanese: 白夜は愛のうめき)	October 18, 2008
A woman, whose husband cheated on her, feels she wants to die to escape the pain he caused. By chance she shares a taxi to the airport with Golgo 13 and also the seat next to his. When the plane is forced to perform a belly landing Golgo reveals to her that she does actually want to live and enjoy life. At their destination, having made love at night, she follows him to his job. Golgo can't allow a witness to the job and so kills her.
29	"Casting"; Transliteration: "Kyasutingu" (Japanese: 配役〈キャスティング〉)	October 25, 2008
A movie director is hired to film Golgo 13 in action in a bid to expose him to the public and thus end his career. He uses an unknown actress whose life story is similar to the scripted events as a way of appearing genuine to hire the hitman. During the job, Duke notices an inconsistency and realizes what is happening and he sets about cleaning up the mess.
30	"Love is a Knife"; Transliteration: "Rabu wa Naifu" (Japanese: ラブはナイフ)	November 1, 2008
A former circus knife-thrower, who can only get well-paid jobs by posing as the real Golgo 13, decides that he should be his own man by killing the real Golgo 13 in order to prove he is the best. He tracks down a target and plans to kill Duke during a job but ultimately ends up biting off more than he can chew.
31	"ANGRY WAVES"	November 8, 2008
A gang of thugs hijack an oil tanker and are prepared to kill the crew who are taken hostage. Among the hijackers is an expert marksman and in hurricane conditions the authorities are not confident that the local coastguard marksmen have the ability to take out the hijackers. With the tanker about to leave US waters, where their jurisdiction ends and the hostages will no longer be needed, they hire Golgo 13 to take clean house.
32	"Murderous Crosspoints"; Transliteration: "Satsui no Kōsa" (Japanese: 殺意の交差)	November 15, 2008
Jonathan Earp, a company executive hires Golgo to assassinate one of the owners of the company. The plan is already laid out with no witnesses or physical evidence, all Duke has to do is pull the trigger, while Earp controls the plane. However a disgruntled employee has switched Earp's lucky bowling ball with a bomb and Earp takes his lucky charm everywhere he goes. The assassination goes off without a hitch but the remaining owner has already worked out what Earp will do and fires him. With Golgo leaving the employee celebrates when the bomb detonates killing Earp and the other owner. Having nearly been blown up Golgo murders the employee.
33	"Wine of Renown"; Transliteration: "Hokori Takaki Wain" (Japanese: 誇り高き葡萄酒(ワイン))	November 22, 2008
Albert is from a proud family of French wine producers but his wines are being bought up by Yanagida, a Japanese man who cannot distinguish between vintages. After an auction where Albert fraudulently sells a 1900 vintage in place of an 1800 vintage, Yanagida hosts a party to show off the wines with several noteworthy sommeliers, who will be able to taste the fraudulent wine, attending. Desperate to retain his pride and not be exposed as a fraud, Albert hires Golgo 13 to shoot the bottle of fake wine during the uncorking. However at the party Yanagida invites Albert, as guest of honor, to perform the uncorking.
34	"The Night of the Murder Play"; Transliteration: "Satsujin Geki no Yoru" (Japanese: 殺人劇の夜)	November 29, 2008
A real-estate businessman, Johnson, discovers that a bet he lost years ago to Crump, another real-estate business man, was rigged and resulted in Crump becoming very rich and powerful. In a bid to exact revenge he hires Golgo 13 to kill Crump, who has a love of the theater, but not anyone else. As Crump is constantly surrounded by bodyguards, Duke has to use a specially made disposable gun and time the shooting with the sound effects of the play and hide the gun before anybody notices.
35	"The Law of Pedigree"; Transliteration: "Kettō no Okite" (Japanese: 血統の掟)	December 5, 2008
The chairman of the Jockey Club hires Golgo 13 to kill a racehorse that is fraudulently labeled a thoroughbred. Shamed by his fraud he had tried to get his niece, Celia, to kill the animal. However as she had raised it and the horse is winning race after race she becomes fiercely protective. Sensing that she will try to put her own life on the line to protect the horse, he decides to tell her that he employed Golgo 13 to kill it, in the knowledge that the assassin would come after him. After failing to persuade Duke to stop, Celia tries to snipe Golgo before he can kill the horse, but his skill easily outmatches hers. Once the horse is dead and knowing that his job was revealed he goes after the chairman.
36	"Expired Fineries"; Transliteration: "Shinitaeta Seisō" (Japanese: 死に絶えた盛装)	December 12, 2008
Golgo is hired to kill a man named Berne Shulze, a wealthy and influential businessman who has disappeared following accusations of swindling. The moment he accepts the job, the client is suddenly shot dead, but as he had accepted he continues. Schulze being a rich man is thought to have had plastic surgery to change his appearance, but his mistress is prominent in the Monte Carlo casino scene. Leaving the casino Duke notices the mistress accompanied by another woman and while following them home, he is ambushed but kills his attackers. Approaching the house he deduces that the other woman is actually Berne Schulze in disguise and at a rally event successfully shoots his target.
37	"Christmas 24 Hours"; Transliteration: "Kurisumasu 24 Awāzu" (Japanese: クリスマス·24アワーズ)	December 19, 2008
Golgo 13 arrives at a hotel for Christmas but immediately falls under the suspicion of Dahl, the hotel detective that has heard about a recent spate of local crimes. When a known pickpocket tries his luck on Golgo he is caught and handed over to Dahl to deal with him. The pickpocket informs Dahl that he felt a gun on Golgo and so she decides to pay him a visit. She realizes that Golgo is not responsible for any of the local crimes but knows he's a professional there to do a job. Meanwhile Tommy Nabarro, a syndicate underboss, is bailed. A policeman informs Dahl that Nabarro is staying in her hotel but he is to be assassinated as he knows about various crimes committed as well as a link between the syndicate and a senator. As Nabarro leaves the hotel on Christmas day Golgo causes him to turn around before sniping him from his room, so it appears that the shooter was at street level. Golgo checks out the hotel and walks past Dahl who is grateful that Nabarro was killed outside the hotel.
38	"A Girl Named Sara"; Transliteration: "Shōjo Sara" (Japanese: 少女サラ)	December 26, 2008
A boy, Patric, picks a man's pocket on the Paris metro and drops off the wallet in his accomplice Sara's hands in front of Golgo 13. Minutes later the man whose pocket was picked, Henri Bazaine, is found dead. Later, just before Patric meets up with Sara he notices a man who he suspects is a detective and so he slips away unnoticed. The man follows Sara and it turns out he is an assassin who killed Bazaine and knows that Sara saw him sitting next to Bazaine. Suddenly Golgo shows up and saves Sara and beats up the assassin. Patric is found by the assassin and is beaten into revealing Sara's location as the wallet contained a memo. Having located Sara, he chases after her but once again she is saved by Golgo. The assassin contacts his client, Carnac, but Golgo kills the assassin having let Carnac know where Sara will be. Golgo takes Sara to a hotel and Carnac appears, and Golgo kills him. Carnac had belonged to a group of biologists working on a project and had stolen the funds for his own purposes. Bazaine was to deliver the memo containing the key to the project that could turn it into a contagion but as he was unable to he was killed. Golgo had been hired by the biologists to ensure Carnac failed.
39	"The Best Day of Ash's Life"; Transliteration: "Asshu Sairyou no Hi" (Japanese: アッシュ最良の日)	January 9, 2009
Golgo 13 is hired to kill Hewitt, the number 2 in a crime syndicate. The head of the syndicate died in an accident and all signs point to Hewitt being responsible. The previous number 1 had placed a large amount of gold bullion in a bank vault and Hewitt becoming paranoid will only be vulnerable on the ceremony day when he visits the vault in the morning. However the location of the bank plus the small army of goons as security make the shot impossible. Opposite lives a struggling artist named Ash who is behind in his rent payments and is the only one in the apartment block. One day Golgo 13 shows up at his door and buys Ash's entire art works making him a rich man. Ash pays off his rent and flies off to Florida to start a new life. Meanwhile Golgo buys the apartment block in cash from the landlord. As Hewitt gets out of the car towards the bank, the client's henchman demolishes the apartment and Golgo 13 from the building behind snipes Hewitt before the dust cloud obstructs his and the goons view. Meanwhile Ash is enjoying his new life in Florida grateful to the man that gave him the means to live this new lifestyle.
40	"The Brutes' Banquet"; Transliteration: "Kichiku no Utage" (Japanese: 鬼畜の宴)	January 16, 2009
Two millionaires who bet on human bloodsports hire a top assassin, Spartacus, to duel with Golgo 13 under the guise of protecting themselves from him. They have the Colosseum rigged with cameras and microphones in order to watch. Golgo 13 emerges from the duel the winner and reveals to Spartacus the recording equipment. Angry that he was used, he hires Golgo 13 to kill the millionaires right before he dies. The millionaires use their influence to fly to South Africa to a safe place while being guarded by the Sicilian mafia and theirs being the first plane out of Rome. However they are shot dead upon arrival from another plane on the tarmac that had overtaken them from Rome while they had refueled in Nairobi.
41	"Night Fog in Petticoat Lane"; Transliteration: "Pechikōto Rēn no Yogiri" (Japanese: ペチコートレーンの夜霧)	January 23, 2009
In the aftermath of the murder of a Russian diplomat and his mistress, a woman walks into bar in a rough area where Golgo 13 is visiting. When he leaves she runs after him and asks him to buy her. Suddenly some men try to kill them but Golgo dispatches them. They go back to a hotel and have sex and again more men try to kill them. A chase ensues and they escape to the sewers where she reveals that she is a CIA assassin behind the diplomat's death and that the men are chasing her and that she managed to hire Golgo 13 for free. After killing all the chasing men she pulls a gun on Golgo but he is quicker and kills her first.
42	"On Large Mouth Lake"; Transliteration: "Rāji Mausu no Kojō" (Japanese: 大きな口(ラージ·マウス)の湖上)	January 30, 2009
Duke kills two moose with one shot while hunting in Canada with a custom powerful rifle and is arrested by two park rangers for going over the allowed quota. While in custody at the ranger station some thugs try to kill him but he shoots them first and escapes kidnapping the female thug. It is revealed that the CIA have hired Duke to kill McCord a double agent before he can defect and the woman he kidnapped works for McCord. Golgo burns her clothes so she cannot escape the log cabin as she would freeze to death outside and gives a local girl an expensive coat to look after her. The woman promptly knocks the girl out and escapes, stealing her clothes, and meets up with McCord to take him to a helicopter to escape. As they travel on a snowmobile she realizes too late that the escape was too easy and that against the white backdrop, the red coat she stole sticks out and that Golgo 13 has a rifle powerful enough to shoot through multiple targets. Using the red coat as a target, Golgo kills both the woman and McCord.
43	"The Lost Assignment"; Transliteration: "Kūhaku no Irai" (Japanese: 空白の依頼)	February 6, 2009
A group of terrorists, whose aim is to kill the king, try to prevent their leader from being assassinated by Golgo 13 by blowing him up. However he escapes but crashes his car. Krista, a woman at the crash scene, takes him back to her place as he refused to go to hospital and realizes that he is a criminal. Golgo is left with amnesia but his instincts saves them from death on more than one occasion and as he slowly regains his memory they make their way to a small village in the country where the king is due to visit soon. As the king arrives Golgo shoots in the air to alert security to his presence as he tries to pressurize himself to remember the target. He remembers that a priest hired him to kill the terrorist leader, Father Vernon, a priest due to look after the king on his visit. He takes aim and kills Father Vernon but Krista witnessed the job. Before Golgo can kill her, she is shot by a terrorist thug aiming for Golgo. Golgo dodges out the way and shoots the terrorist. The security forces only find Krista's body as they reach the scene.
44	"Rockford's Ambition"; Transliteration: "Rokkufōdo no Yabō" (Japanese: ロックフォードの野望)	February 13, 2009
David Rockford, the most powerful and influential man in the world, attempts to hire Golgo 13 on a permanent basis but is refused. Using his vast wealth and connections he has Golgo's secret bank accounts and cards frozen. Golgo finds out about a man named Jiang-Sun Huang, the leader of a group of Chinese expats in Taiwan who have an extensive intelligence network who can find Rockford. Huang hires Golgo 13 to kill Rockford as the expats are being squeezed by Rockford for their resources. Rockford flees to his villa in Switzerland and calls the U.S. president. In return for ensuring his rigged re-election the president calls Golgo 13 and warns him to leave Switzerland or face every law enforcement agency in the world. Golgo shoots Rockford from a boat outside the Swiss border.
45	"1 Second out of 36,000 Seconds"; Transliteration: "San Man Roku Sen Byō Bun no Ichi Byō" (Japanese: 36000秒分の1秒)	February 20, 2009
A man hires Golgo 13 to kill Carronte, a terrorist in a maximum security prison, to avenge the death of his family in a random act of terrorism. However Carronte's cell is behind a revolving door and sliding door and only has a small aperture window. Golgo 13 has to maintain his posture for ten hours in order to make the shot. Knowing this is impossible he contacts a man who was involved in an athletic doping scandal who can make a drug to relax his muscles. Golgo manages to shoot the target but his muscles are in a bad shape and requires professional massage to recover. The chemist had offered to do this but took Golgo's vital statistics to an FSB contact who would give him a huge reward for killing Golgo 13. As Golgo can hardly move he moves to kill him but does not anticipate how well prepared the professional is.
46	"End of the Century Hollywood"; Transliteration: "Seikimatsu Hariuddo" (Japanese: 世紀末ハリウッド)	February 27, 2009
Loi, an Asian film producer is looking to shoot on location in America but the actors and producers are continually being assassinated. In order to protect the star of his movie, Lee, and secure the future of the Hong Kong film industry, he hires Golgo 13 to kill those responsible for the attempts on Lee's life, however he does not know who is behind the attacks. An American company is behind the attacks using the DIA to try to kill Lee out of fear that the Hong Kong film industry will bankrupt them and erode into the American film industry, reducing the American influence around the world. Golgo moves Loi and Lee to a Chinese secret armored building and when DIA elite troops attack, he has planned its defense and is able to kill most of the troops and determine who is responsible. Some make it to where Loi and Lee are and fatally shoot Loi. Golgo shoot the halogen gas fire system releasing the gas into the airtight room. Shooting the window with a grenade the air pressure difference sucks out the remaining troops. Golgo finishes the assignment by killing the one responsible for the assassinations.
47	"The Unceasing Night"; Transliteration: "Yoru wa Kiezu" (Japanese: 夜は消えず)	March 6, 2009
Mayor Bardot's wife, Danielle, recognizes Duke Togo at a party at a hotel from a previous sexual encounter. Bardot hires some thugs to persuade him to leave town but they are easily overpowered and are forced to lead Duke to Bardot. There he recognizes Danielle as a former prostitute who had killed her pimp that same night she met Golgo. Fearful that Golgo was responsible for threatening to blackmail Bardot about Danielle's past he tried to get Golgo to leave but, just as he had done before, Golgo warned them to never bother him. However Danielle had also hired an assassin to kill Golgo for the blackmail but now realises that he was not responsible and tries to persuade the assassin to abort but due to pride he continues. Golgo shoots the assassin during a car chase causing Danielle to die in the ensuing crash.
48	"Black People's Ebony Eyes"; Transliteration: "Kuroi Hitomi EBONY EYES" (Japanese: 黒い瞳 EBONY EYES)	March 13, 2009
Mafia boss, Thomas Grebbick has annoyed his superiors who send their three hitmen to kill him. To protect himself he sends his own, Ron, who kills them. In retaliation the bosses hire Golgo 13 to kill Grebbick. While Golgo evades Grebbick's goons, Ron's girlfriend recognises Golgo as her child's father from a previous sexual encounter. She begs him to just take a glance at their child. Grebbick arranges to meet Golgo to persuade him to switch sides or the child will be killed. Instead Golgo completes his contract and shoots Grebbick and Ron accidentally shoots his girlfriend while trying to kill Golgo. All the goons are killed leaving only Golgo and the child. After glancing at the child Golgo leaves.
49	"Armoured Suit SDR2"; Transliteration: "Sōkōhei Esu-Dī-Āru-Tsū" (Japanese: 装甲兵SDR2)	March 20, 2009
Following a successful assassination, Golgo's escape plane crash lands on an island where the American military are testing the new SDR2 armoured suit against captured terrorists. The inexperienced pilot is ordered to kill Golgo as he is a witness to the new technology. As the pilot becomes increasingly unstable after being outsmarted several times Golgo is finally able to destroy the SDR2 with a well-placed shot. The American officer has Golgo brought in where he demands his services as an advisor. Not wanting to comply Golgo kills the officer and the guards.
50	"The Arms of the Angel, The Arms of the Devil"; Transliteration: "Tenshi to Akuma no "Ude"" (Japanese: 天使と悪魔の"腕")	March 27, 2009
Albert Stantz, a governor election candidate, hires Golgo 13 to assassinate Wassant, a philanthropist dedicated to transforming orphans into valuable members of society. They both shared a history belonging to an anarchist street gang and Wassant is now trying to atone for his past. However Duke is involved in a car accident where his dominant right arm is severely injured and next to useless. He finds Dr. Cutter, a surgeon with amazing dexterity and skill to heal his arm. Overhearing a telephone conversation between Cutter and another orphan, he learns that Cutter is one of Wassant's orphans and deduces that Stantz had mentioned Golgo 13, breaking Duke's terms of agreement. After successfully shooting Wassant and leaving the weapon at the scene he shoots Stantz, again leaving the weapon at the scene. The M16 used to kill Wassant was modified to be shot left-handed while the other M16 was unmodified. Cutter theorises that Duke had used his left hand as an obligation to him for healing his arm. The series ends with Duke leaving for the airport.
